= Kampfgeschwader 76 =

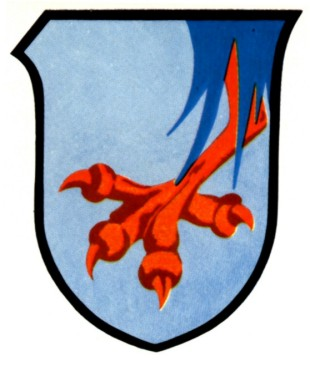
- Emblem of Kampfgeschwader 76
- Active: 1939–45
- Country: Germany
- Branch: Luftwaffe
- Type: Bomber Wing
- Role: Air interdiction close air support Offensive counter air Maritime interdiction Strategic bombing
- Size: Air force group
- Engagements: Polish Campaign; Battle of the Netherlands; Battle of Belgium; Battle of France; Battle of Britain; Eastern Front; Mediterranean, Middle East and African theatres Western Front

Insignia
- Identification symbol: Geschwaderkennung of F1

Kampfgeschwader 76 (KG 76) (Battle Wing) was a Luftwaffe bomber Group during World War II. It was one of the few bomber groups that operated throughout the war.

In 1933 Adolf Hitler and the Nazi Party came to power in Germany. To meet the expansionist aims of their Führer, the German state began an enormous rearmament programme to build the Wehrmacht (German armed forces). KG 76 was created in May 1939 as the Luftwaffe sought to reorganise and increase its strength. The wing was permitted three Gruppen (Groups) in May 1939, but only two were operational by August. The Dornier Do 17 light bomber equipped the wing's units.

In September 1939 German and Soviet forces invaded Poland, beginning World War II. KG 76 served in the campaign until the 17 September 1939 and then proceeded to spend the Phoney War resting and re-equipping. All three groups began the offensive in Western Europe (Fall Gelb) on 10 May 1940. KG 76 supported the German Army (Heer) in the Battle of Belgium and Battle of France. In July 1940 KG 76 served in the Battle of Britain and The Blitz until May 1941. During the course of these operations it converted to the Junkers Ju 88.

From June 1941 KG 76 supported Army Group North in Operation Barbarossa, the invasion of the Soviet Union. It remained on the Eastern Front until December 1942 and never returned. From December 1942 to January 1944 it operated exclusively the Mediterranean and Middle East theatre, mainly in the Maritime interdiction role. It participated in the Battle of Tunisia, in the final phase of the North African Campaign (November 1942—May 1943) and also in the Italian Campaign, from July 1943 until May 1944. Some of its staffeln converted to the Messerschmitt Me 410 and Junkers Ju 188 in the spring, 1944.

Some of KG 76s Gruppen saw service on the Western Front in the night intruder role because of Allied air superiority. It formed part of the bomber force for Operation Steinbock and contested the D-Day landings in the summer, 1944. It was withdrawn from the Battle of Normandy after heavy losses. KG 76 continued to operate over the Low Countries and supported the Ardennes Offensive in the Aerial reconnaissance and close air support role. Significantly, KG 76 made use of the first-ever operational jet bomber design, the Arado Ar 234. KG 76 remained operating on the West Front until May 1945, one of the few bomber units to do so.

The last remaining groups either withdrew to Norway on 3 May 1945 or surrendered to the British Army in northern Germany on 8 May 1945.

== Background ==
The first steps towards the Luftwaffe's formation were undertaken just months after Adolf Hitler came to power. Hermann Göring became National Kommissar for aviation with former Deutsche Luft Hansa director Erhard Milch as his deputy. In April 1933 the Reichsluftfahrtministerium (RLM—Reich Air Ministry) was established. On 25 March 1933 the Deutschen Luftsportverband (DVLA) (German Air Sport Association) absorbed all private and national organisations. The merging of all military aviation organisations in the RLM took place on 15 May 1933, which became the Luftwaffe's official day of foundation. The Nationalsozialistisches Fliegerkorps (NSFK—National Socialist Flyers Corps) was formed in 1937 to give pre-military flying training to male youths, and to engage adult sport aviators in the Nazi movement. Military age members of the NSFK were drafted to the Luftwaffe. As all such prior NSFK members were also Nazi Party members, this gave the new Luftwaffe a strong Nazi ideological base in contrast to the other branches (Heer and Kriegsmarine) of the Wehrmacht.

With this base of organisation, the Luftwaffe began an enormous expansion program lasting six years to 1939. In 1938, during the preparations for Fall Grün (Green), the proposed invasion of Czechoslovakia, both Hitler and Göring discovered the Luftwaffe was more "shadow than substance". The German air arm possessed only 2,928 aircraft in total while the aviation industry's production target was 1,179 per month. Munitions and aircraft armament production could only cover 50 percent of current operational requirements. Fuel reserves allowed for only four weeks of aerial operations. There also shortages of spares and technical units, although bomber groups received three while other types of aircraft units were given only one.

By January 1939 there were 269 first-line Staffeln (Squadrons). Only 90 (33 percent) were bomber squadrons. A further six would be added by 1 July. Among these formations was KG 76. Hitler's expansionist aims required a larger air force and the annexations, or unopposed invasions, of Austria and Czechoslovakia allowed the industry to exploit the new territories and expand the size of the aircraft industry to a small degree. In manpower terms it received substantial reinforcement. A late concerted effort—of which KG 76 was part—was ordered and this expansion and designation produced a frontline strength of 4,093 aircraft of which 1,176 were bombers.

=== Formation ===
Kampfgeschwader 76 (KG 76) was formed on 1 May 1939 at Wiener Neustadt in Austria with Stab./KG 76 and I Gruppe. The new bomber formation was formed from KG 158 stab (command) unit. The Geschwader was placed under the command of Luftflotte 4 (Air Fleet). Oberst Paul Schultheiss was appointed the first Geschwaderkommodore (Wing Commander) of KG 76. The stab and I Gruppe trained throughout the summer on the Dornier Do 17E. Oberst Stefan Fröhlich was given command and became the group's first Gruppenkommandeur (Group Commander). Near the end of August 1939 both formations converted to flying the Do 17Z.

II. Gruppe was not formed until 1 January 1940 at Wels where it was placed under the command of Major Walter Hill. It trained its bomber crews on the Do 17Z and was also placed under the command of Luftflotte 4. The original order for formation occurred on 19 September 1939, after the war had begun, but it was repeatedly delayed. III. Gruppe was also formed on 1 May and became operational at Rosenborn, southwest of Breslau, on 26 August 1939. Oberst Werner Zech became the first group commander.

KG 76 operated the Dornier Do 17 light bomber at the outbreak of World War II. Photographical evidence from the period confirms that the wing did operate the Heinkel He 111 medium bomber. 1 Staffel operated the He 111 in the Mediterranean region. KG 76 partially converted to the Junkers Ju 88 in 1940. In August 1939 KG 76 began mobilisation for war. Stab./KG 76 was brought to combat readiness at Breslau-Schöngarten. I. Gruppe deployed to Silesia for mobilisation on 26 August 1939. III. Gruppe readied for war at Rosenborn. By the 31 August 1939 Stab KG 76 could field nine Do 17s, all of which were operational. The 36 Do 17s belonging to II. Gruppe were also combat ready. II. Gruppe had all 39 Do 17s operational. The Geschwader was assigned to the 1. Flieger-Division (1st Flying Division) which operated under the 4th Luftflotte.

== World War II ==
=== Invasions of Poland ===
On 1 September 1939 German forces began Fall Weiss, an invasion of Poland which began World War II in Europe. General-Major Bruno Loerzer, commanding the 2nd Fliegerdivision ordered attacks on Polish Air Force airfields to achieve air superiority. Cloudy weather forced KG 76 to abandon its first missions. Throughout the first day of the invasion the wing did bomb airfields and Polish Army troop concentrations along the Vistula river. Bombing operations continued and were extended to Galicia until 21 September. I. Gruppe struck at targets in and around Łódź, Radom, Kielce, Częstochowa, Krosno and Moderowka. Luftflotte 4 flew only a small number of missions because of the fog. Half were directed at airfields: I./KG 76 were a part of the operations. Neighbouring Kampfgeschwader 4 flew 150 sorties and dropped 200 tonnes of bombs on airfields around Kraków.

On 4 September KG 76 embarked upon railway interdiction operations. The purpose of these attacks was to cause congestion at Polish railheads. The Polish land forces using roads were simultaneously attacking road traffic at an altitude of 2,000 metres (6,500 feet) and above followed by 10 to 30 degree diving attacks. The bombing raids prevented the Łódź Army from detraining. KG 76 received support from KG 55 and KG 77. The dive-bombing was carried out by Junkers Ju 87 Stukas. The operational-level attacks were effective and from 5 September the shortage of new targets led to a focus on close air support.

In mid-September, from the 14th, KG 76 supported the German 14th Army. KG 76 resumed rail interdiction missions to cut off Polish lines running into Romania and eastern Poland. KG 76 flew low-level sorties against rail bridges and choke points. On 16 September KG 76 was formally assigned to Hugo Sperrle's Luftflotte 3. On the night of the 16/17 September the attacks were ordered to stop. Luftflotte 4 received a teletype message alerting them to a secret clause in the Nazi-Soviet Pact which allowed for the Soviet invasion of Poland. III./KG 76 remained active in the war on Poland until 22 September.

The German-Soviet campaign in Poland ended on 6 October 1939. KG 76 spent the winter and the following spring resting, training and re-equipping. Stab./KG 76 moved to Nidda southeast of Giessen in February 1940. II./KG 76 moved from Breslau to Wiener Neustadt on 22 September then to Leipheim in Bavaria where it was ordered to stand-by in case of an emergency and end of the Phoney War. In mid-October it relocated to Crailsheim until December. From January to April 1940 it was stationed at Merzhausen, Nordhausen and Langensalza. II./KG 76 moved to Nidda with Stab./KG 76. III. Gruppe were more active. After a brief period at Wels, it went to Baltringen southwest of Ulm in the first half of October and Schwäbisch Hall late in the month. The group also moved to Nidda southeast of Giessen with a possible stay at Gotha. From 6–24 April 1940 it flew training exercises over Rheims-Laon.

The unit did not participate in Operation Weserübung but instead spent the spring training and resting in preparation for the western offensive in 1940.

=== Battle of France ===
Stab./KG 76 had one Do 17M (unserviceable) and all four serviceable Do 17Zs. I. Gruppe mustered 32 serviceable Dorniers from 36, while II. Gruppe had 34 from 25 operational. III./KG 76 had a slightly higher number with 26 from 35 Do 17s combat ready. KG 76 was assigned to the I. Fliegerkorps for Fall Gelb, the attack on France and the Low Countries. III./KG 76 moved to Bonn days after the offensive began.

On 10 May 1940 the Battle of France began and KG 76 supported the offensive by attacking the airfield at Laon. Over Charleville-Mézières 7 staffel KG 76 met No. 87 Squadron RAF and Hawker Hurricanes Feldwebel Walter Reiske's aircraft crashed. The crew became prisoners of war and among the first of the wing's casualties. KG 76 bombed targets along the River Maas and in support of Army Group C along the Maginot Line. On 13 May it supported Hermann Hoth's Panzer Corps cross the Meuse at Houx and Dinant.

KG 76 remained on counter-air operations and it attacked the Royal Air Force (RAF) airfield at Vitry on 18 May. 607 and 151 Squadron lost one Bristol Blenheim and 14 Hurricanes destroyed. On 17 May KG 76 bombed targets in Cambrai. On 19 May it began to support German forces in the Battle of Belgium, and struck targets in the Tournai area. II. Gruppe operated over the Flavion area on 15 May and relocated to Cologne in mid-May. On 16 May it attacked targets near Maubeuge and Charleroi in Belgium. On 17–18 May Cambrai was bombed and the group moved to Vogelsang near Aachen on 19 May. The Gruppe then proceeded to Escarmain north east of Cambrai. All three groups supported Army Group A's advance to the English Channel. KG 76 bombed ports at Ostend and Dunkirk from 25 May–1 June. At the beginning on Fall Rot, KG 76 has seen the strength of the wing decline after a month of air operations. On 10 May it had around 110 bombers and 89 percent serviceability. By mid-May the figures had slipped to 107 and 69 percent. On 31 May KG 76 reported 85 bombers with 58 operational (68 percent).

The Geschwader took part in Operation Paula, a concentrated attack on airfields around Paris, which began on 3 June as a prelude to Fall Rot. KG 76 also attacked targets in the Normandy and Brittany area from 6–12 June but the results of these bombing raids are not recorded. KG 76 is known to have supported offensives in the Aumale and Amiens area on 8 June. The German units were now operating at the limit of their range. II. Gruppe moved to forward-airfields at Saint-Léger-des-Aubées.

Following the French campaign, II./KG 76 was disbanded and merged into III./KG 28 on 9 July 1940. However, oddly, the Gruppe was reformed on the very same day, as it was decided to rename III./KG 28 back to II./KG 76. The unit also converted to the Ju 88 at this time.

=== Battle of Britain ===
KG 76 moved into Belgium and France following the end of the campaign in Western Europe. The German Wehrmacht began preparations for Operation Sea Lion, the proposed but risky plan to invade the United Kingdom. Throughout July and early August 1940, the Luftwaffe began a series of attacks on shipping in the English Channel, known as the Kanalkampf phase of what became known as the Battle of Britain. KG 76 was placed under the control of Albert Kesselring's Luftflotte 2 based in Brussels. A fourth unit, Lehrstaffel (training squadron) was added, and based at Beaumont-le-Roger.

While the Geschwader prepared for the main air offensive to begin, it carried out preliminary attacks on southern England. III. Gruppe moved to Cormeilles-en-Vexin. The formation flew very few sorties in July 1940. One reason for this was the conversion and re-training of crews onto the Ju 88A-4. The first recorded loss of this type occurred over Dungeness on 29 July. II. Gruppe moved to Creil on 9 July. It joined III./KG 76 in anti-shipping operations on 29 July. On 13 August II./KG 76 reported 28 of 36 Ju 88s operational. III./KG 76 could muster only 19 from 32 Do 17s on 29 July. I. Gruppe transferred to Beauvais–Tillé Airport and reported all 29 Do 17s operational on 13 August—the earliest known operational readiness report.

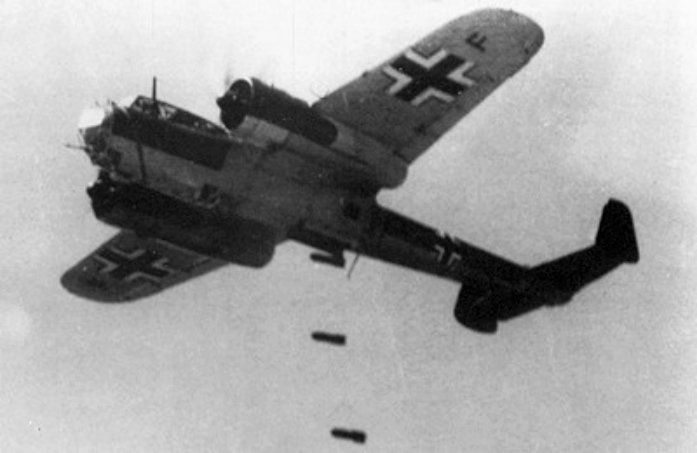
Dornier Do 17s of KG 76 dropping bombs

On the night of the 25/26 July 1940, KG 76 flew via Land's End and bombed Southampton. On 29 July III./KG 76 sent Ju 88s out at low-level to evade detection by British radar. The target was a series of convoys but the bombers scored no direct or near misses. The Gruppenkommandeur, Adolf Genth, was killed when he flew into a balloon cable off Dungeness and another was lost with its crew, when it was shot down by the escort ships. Observers called for fighter assistance and 610 Squadron Supermarine Spitfires were sent but the Ju 88s were gone. Genth was replaced by Major Franz von Benda. II./KG 76 recorded the wing's first inland sortie over England when it attacked RAF Hawkinge on the coast on 11 August with unknown results. The group did not report any losses. The attack was repeated on 12 August. On this day the Luftwaffe and RAF Fighter Command clashed in large-air battles over the Channel. III Gruppe struck at dawn. The German pilots succeeded in destroying two Hangars, the station workshops and four fighter aircraft on the ground. Station Commander Squadron leader E. E. Arnold had the airfield full functional again in 24 hours. The Germans escaped without loss.

On 13 August the Luftwaffe initiated its offensive against Fighter Command in earnest. Codenamed "Adlertag" (Eagle Day), the attack failed to achieve the set objective of destroying Fighter Command. RAF Kenley, RAF Debden and RAF Biggin Hill were bombed by KG 76. There are no recorded losses for KG 76 although the day ended in defeat for the Luftwaffe which lost c. 200 killed or captured including 44 killed, 23 wounded at least 45 missing. On 16 August I. and III. Gruppen struck at unspecified targets in England and II. Gruppe turned back because of weather conditions, abandoning their attack on Debden.

The 18 August 1940—known as The Hardest Day—was particularly cost for KG 76. At their airfield at Cormeilles-en-Vexin, 9 Staffel (Squadron) KG 76 were briefed by their commander Hauptmann (Captain) Joachim Roth. The Staffel was to conduct a low-level attack against Kenley with Roth flying as a navigator in the lead aircraft. The nine Do 17s were to head across the Channel and make landfall at Beachy Head. From there they were to follow the Brighton-London rail line north-east to the target area. The crews were ordered to concentrate their attacks against buildings and hangars on the southern end of the airfield. The Dorniers were to carry twenty 110-lb bombs each fitted with a fuse that would allow for function if released from 50 feet or higher; the type of bomb previously used by the Staffel had to release from twice this height, making the unit's Do 17s correspondingly more vulnerable to ground fire. The attack was to be part of a coordinated pincer movement against the airfields. Ju 88s from II./KG 76 were to dive-bomb buildings and hangars from high-altitude first. Five minutes later, 27 Do 17s from I. and II./KG 76 would level-bomb from high altitude to crater the runways and landing grounds while knocking out its defences. 9. Staffel KG 76, the specialist low-level strike unit, would go in and finish off any buildings still standing. The operation began at 09:00 CET but was postponed because of heavy haze reducing visibility up to 4,000 feet.

The form-up was more difficult for KG 76 and its Do 17s and Ju 88s. Their bases in and around Calais were covered in 8/10ths cloud cover with a base of 6,500 feet which reached to 10,000 feet. As the bombers climbed through the haze the formation soon lost cohesion. Valuable time was lost as they reformed. The Do 17s of I. and III./KG 76 had overtaken the III./KG 76 Ju 88s which should have been ahead of them by five minutes. These delay had serious consequences for 9 Staffel KG 76 for it would meet undamaged defences. The wing attacked Biggin Hill but were intercepted by 92, 615, 32 and 111 Squadron. 1 staffel lost one bomber while 2 and 3 suffered with one bomber damaged from each. 5 staffel lost one bomber destroyed and one damaged as did 8 staffel and 6 staffel lost one aircraft. The specialist low-level attack squadron 9 staffel lost two Do 17s and five damaged when it undertook and independent operation against RAF Kenley. Aircraftman D. Roberts fired parachute-and-cable launchers which caused most of the damage.

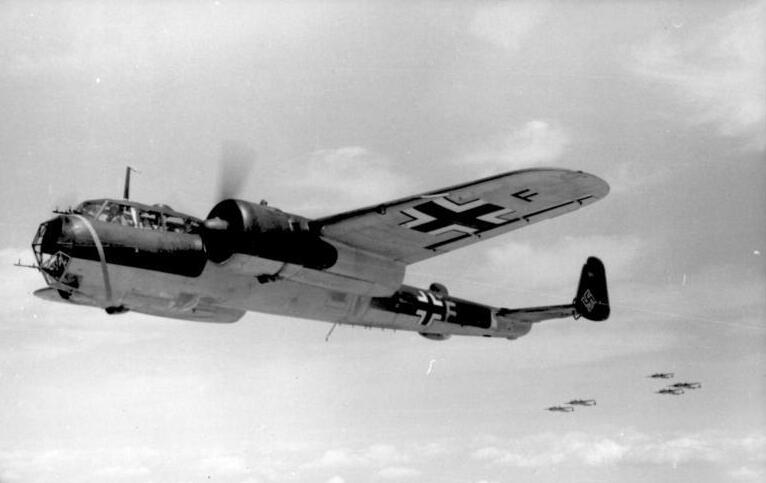
Dornier Do 17s of KG 76 in flight

For their efforts, 9. Staffel destroyed at least three hangars, hit several other buildings and destroyed eight Hurricanes on the ground. According to other sources, 10 hangars were destroyed, six damaged, the operations room put out of action, and many buildings were destroyed. It would have been worse had the bombs been released higher. A lot of bombs landed horizontally and did not explode on impact. To achieve this level of damage, KG 76 dropped nine tons of bombs. At the end of the day just one hangar was left operational at Kenley. The low-level raid put the airfield out of commission for two hours. In combat, two Hurricanes were shot down by the Dornier's return fire. Low-level attacks were abandoned after The Hardest Day.

I./KG 76 was reduced to 19 out of 29 serviceable machines by 18 August 1940 but II. Gruppe numbers are unknown for this period. III. Gruppe reported 17 from 24 Do 17s ready for action on 24 August. KG 76 were in action on 23 August and reported one loss. On 24 August III./KG 76 attacked RAF North Weald and RAF Hornchurch while II./KG 76 bombed Biggin Hill. The Stab unit lost two Dorniers in action with No. 264 Squadron RAF and 4 staffel lost two and one damaged in combat with the same RAF squadron. KG 76 are known to have been in action on 25 August, for 3 staffel lost a bomber in combat with No. 32 Squadron RAF. II./KG 76 returned to Biggin Hill on 31 August. The group apparently flew with a formation of Heinkel He 111s from an unknown unit. A mixed force of Dorniers and Heinkels bombed both Biggin Hill and RAF Croydon. The He 111s appear to have bombed Biggin Hill, destroying two of the three remaining hangars, the living quarters and operations room eliminating the telephone system. II. Gruppe lost one Do 17 in combat with No. 151 Squadron RAF over the Thames Estuary.

Elements of KG 76 bombed Kenley on 6 September. 6. Staffel reported the only losses of the wing this day. Three Ju 88s crashed, one being badly damaged in combat with No. 41 Squadron RAF fighter ace Eric Lock. Two more were posted missing after being engaged by 111 Squadron and anti-aircraft artillery. KG 76 probably took part in the attack on London the following day which began The Blitz and marked a change in German strategy from attacking RAF airfields to bombing cities. No loss appears to have been reported on 7 September by KG 76 although 63 German aircraft suffered destruction or damage on 7 September.

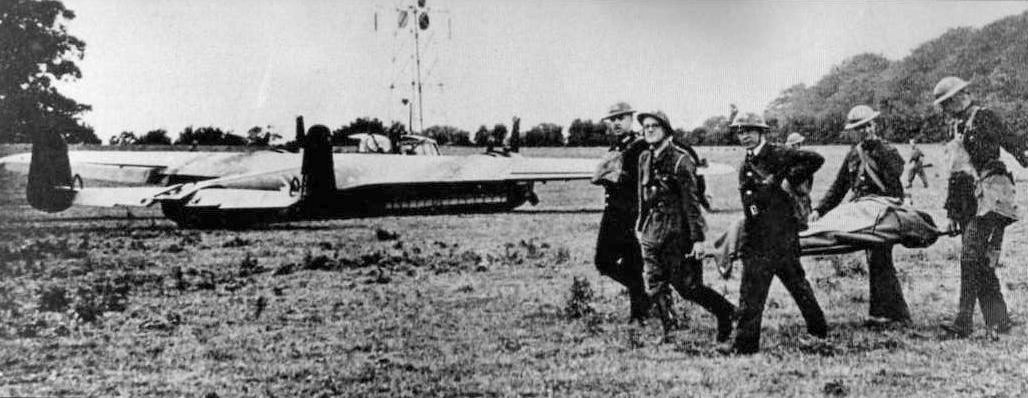
Feldwebel Rudolf Heitsch's Dornier Do 17 at Castle Farm, Shoreham. The flamethrower is just visible on the aft fuselage.

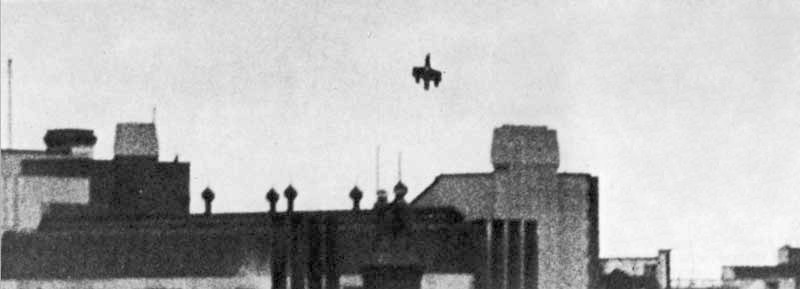
Feldwebel Robert Zehbe's Dornier falling on Victoria Station after being rammed by Holmes.

On 15 September 1940 KG 76 were part of an all-out attack on London that became known in the historiography of the Battle of Britain as the "Battle of Britain Day". The wing spearheaded the first major raid of the day. Major Alois Lindmayr Gruppenkommandeur of I./KG 76, led the entire formation. Lindmayr was an experienced combat veteran having won the Knight's Cross of the Iron Cross for his effective low-level attacks in France. III./KG 76 took off with 19 Do 17s. At the same time, 20 mi (32 km) to the north, I./KG 76 took off. Usually a Gruppe could field 27 bombers. After weeks of attrition, I./KG 76 could put up only eight Do 17s. The Geschwader had to field two Gruppen to do the work of one. Most of the Dorniers were in poor shape, worn down by intensive operations. The two groups rendezvoused at Amiens then proceeded to Cap Gris Nez to pick up their Messerschmitt Bf 109 escort. Heavy losses encouraged crews to seek innovative weapons for defence. One pilot, Feldwebel Rolf Heitsch, had his Dornier fitted with an infantry flame thrower in its tail. After take-off the formation broke up in cloud and was delayed for 10 minutes to allow reforming. Two bombers failed to do and returned to base—Heitsch was one of them. The second operation of the day was flown in the afternoon. KG 76 lost six bombers and another two damaged.

=== The Blitz ===
KG 76 began to scale down daylight operations in September. I./KG 76 withdrew from France to Güttersloh and Giebelstadt on 24 October 1940 to convert onto the Ju 88. III./KG 76 remained and carried out bombing raids on 6 October against unknown targets and on 27 October against RAF Martlesham Heath. II. Gruppe bombed Channel ports on 4 October but withdrew to Ansbach and Giebelstadt for rest until January 1941 when it returned to Châteaudun. In December 1940 III./KG 76 transferred to Illesheim and given leave. From December 1940 to March 1941 it slowly converted to the Ju 88.

I./KG 76 participated in the London Blitz and it bombed the city on 25 September and then Coventry on 1 November. III. Gruppe bombed London on night of the 15/16 November 1940. Hitler's Directive 23, Directions for operations against the British War Economy, published on 6 February 1941, gave aerial interdiction of British imports by sea top priority. This strategy had been recognised before the war, but the Battle of Britain had got in the way of striking at Britain's sea communications and diverted German air strength to the campaign against the RAF and its supporting structures.

The German bomber fleet was equipped with Knickebein (crooked-leg) and began using X-Gerät and X-Gerät navigational aids at this time. British jamming began the Battle of the Beams which lasted through the Blitz. III. Gruppe bombed London again on 18/19 March with I. Gruppe while II./KG 76 operated over the city on the night of the 17/18 February 1941. The group switched to Swansea on 20/21 February. Eight He 111s from Kampfgruppe 100 guided the attackers to the target that night.

Cardiff was the target on the night of the 3/4 March 1941 for II Gruppe. On 8/9 and 9/10 March the group attacked London and bombed Portsmouth on 10/11 March. Birkenhead was bombed on 12/13 March, then it flew two missions against Glasgow and Liverpool the following night. On the 14/15 March they repeated two raids in one night over Glasgow and then bombed Sheffield. Avonmouth (16/17 March), London (19/20 March) and Plymouth 21/22 March were all carried out with the participation of II./KG 76. The group targeted Bristol on 29/30 March. III./KG 76 carried out an attack on Portland and then a long-range operation against Belfast.

In April KG 76 continued bombing operations. It bombed Coventry on 8/9 April and Birmingham on 9/10 and 10/11 April. I. and III. Gruppe were used on the night of the 19/20 April 1941 to bomb London. Hermann Göring to ordered the attack to celebrate Hitler's birthday. Belfast and Portland were attacked on 15/16 April, while Liverpool was bombed on 26/27 April, 3/4, 4/5 and 7/8 May. Hull, Nottingham and Sheffield were bombed on the night of 8/9 May. KG 76 bombed the port town of Grimsby in May 1941.

KG 76 began moving to East Prussia on 7 June 1941, for Operation Barbarossa. It appears its last sortie as on 29/30 May 1941, when II. Gruppe attacked shipping in the Humber Estuary.

=== Eastern Front ===
In early June 1941 KG 76 began moving to East Prussia. It continued to serve under Fliegerkorps I which was subordinated to Luftflotte 1. Stab KG 76 had only one Ju 88 at Gerdauen. It shared the field with I. Gruppe which could muster 30 Ju 88s with 22 operational. II./KG 76 was based at Jürgenfelde with 30 Ju 88s (25 operational). III./KG 76 were located at Schippenbeil but had on strength 29 Ju 88s with 22 combat ready as of the 21 June 1941. The wing supported Army Group North in the opening phases of Barbarossa and the war on the Eastern Front.

KG 76 supported the German advance through the Baltic states. On 22–24 June it carried out attacks against Red Air Force airfields and armoured formations in the Šiauliai. Fyodor Kuznetsov, commander of the Baltic Military District, ordered counter-attacks against the German advance on 22 June. The Soviet 3rd and 12th Mechanised Corps congregated for an attack on the XXXXI Panzer Corps west of Šiauliai. The Soviet armour was detected by German aerial reconnaissance. Ju 88s from Luftflotte 1, KG 76 among them, destroyed 40 tanks and lorries belonging to the 23rd Tank Division, 12th Mechanised Corps. The 12th Mechanised Corps committed the 28th Tank Division and 202nd Mechanised Division near Šiauliai and a large tank-battle developed. KG 76, with KG 77 and KG 1 were forced to operate in the close support role because the air fleet lacked Ju 87s. KG 77 and 76 lost 22 Ju 88s in total, 21 were completely destroyed. A notable loss to KG 76 on this date was Hauptmann Robert von Sichart, commanding I Gruppe who was killed on 23 June.

On 26 June KG 76 operated in the Zigare and Pskov area on 29 June. The three bomber wings carried out effective interdiction operations in support of Panzergruppe 4 on 2 July. On 4 July KG 76 and KG 77 flew attacks against Soviet airfields at Idritsa and Opochka to relieve pressure on the German 16th Army. On 5 July the German bomber contingent claimed 112 aircraft destroyed in the ground. The three bomber wings supported the hard-pressed 1. Panzer Division near Ostrov. For the loss of two bombers in total, KG 1, 76 and 77, 140 Soviet tanks were destroyed along with the supply lines to the town. Army Group North's advance toward Leningrad was slowed by severe resistance. From 22 June to 13 July the three bomber wings from Fliegerlorps I had claimed 1,211 aircraft on the ground. On 13 July Army Group North reported 354 Soviet aircraft over its front necessitating repeated attacks upon airfields.

By 22 July KG 76 reported it had lost 30 Ju 88s destroyed or damaged by hostile action. KG 1 and KG 77 reported 24 and 35 respectively. From mid-July KG 76 was directed at interdiction missions against the Soviet 8th Army. The Soviet field army had mounted severe resistance to German progress in the battle for Estonia. In late July KG 76 flew attacks against the rail links between Leningrad and Moscow. On 1 July II Gruppe flew against the airfield at Novgorod with ZG 26 but could only destroy four aircraft on the ground for the loss of one Ju 88 to the 6 IAP. Its pilot Bodo Lehr died, drowning in lake Ilmen. In August I./KG 76 carried out attacks in the Lake Ilmen area on the second day. It also bombed targets in and around Novgorod on 14 August. On 26 August Byegunitsi. II./KG 76 transferred to Korovye Selo on 23–25 July, south of Pskov. It bombed targets in the Kamenka area on 31 July. III. Gruppe supported the drive to Leningrad, Novgorod and Lake Ladoga from 19 to 20 July. It bombed Krasnogvardeisk. Along with KG 4 and KG 77, KG 76 conducted a seven-hour rolling attack on Northwestern Front forces in the Staraya Russa area which eliminated resistance there.

In September KG 76 was reassigned to Luftflotte 2. III. Gruppe was moved to Orsha. II. Gruppe also supported the advance to Leningrad until 27 September. It moved to Orsha on 29 September. I Gruppe followed suit on the same day. In the days following KG 76 shifted its support to Army Group Centre during Operation Typhoon that led to the Battle of Moscow. I./KG 76 bombed Moscow several times, from 10 November 1941 onwards. I./KG 76 was put under the command of Fliegerkorps VIII, and then withdrawn for re-equipment in January 1942. KG 76's losses during Barbarossa were light for II./KG 76. II./KG 76 losses amounted to just 2 per week, including damaged machines.

=== Crimean, Black Sea and Caucasus ===
Stab KG 76 remained in the East tactically renamed Gefechtsverband Bormann. It commanded formations from KG 54, KG 76 and KG 77. It fought the Red Army counter-attack which began on 5 December 1941 and on defensive operations from 9 November 1941 to April 1942. II. Gruppe was sent to East Prussia to rest and refit. It began returning a staffel at a time. It took part in the Battles of Rzhev from 29 to 30 December 1941. In 1941 II./KG 76 suffered the loss of one to two aircraft per week. On 1 January 1942 it operated in the Staritsa. It participated in unspecified operations at Torzhok northwest of Kalinin on 2 January. Rzhev was bombed on the 24 January and it carried out attacks in the area of Yukhnov on the 29th day. The group moved further south on 5 February, bombing Voronezh and Kresty on 15 February. On 1 March 1942 it recorded 28 Ju 88A-4s and three Ju 88C-6s. Activities in March are unknown. It transferred to Kitzingen via Orsha and Giebelstadt on 11 April 1942.

KG 76 continued to serve under Fliegerkorps VIII under Wolfram Freiherr von Richthofen, itself subordinated to Luftflotte 2. The Stab unit transferred from Orsha to Kitzingen Germany on 11 April 1942. I Gruppe re-equipped unit mid-April 1942 and had 22 Ju 88s at Giebelstadt on 1 April. It transferred to Zebriko near Odessa on 17 April. III./KG 76 was transferred back to Army Group North and Luftflotte 1 on 12 November. It flew bombing operations near Lake Ilmen from 13 to 17 November 1941. From 19 to 21 November KG 76 flew in support of the Siege of Leningrad. Long-range operations against Rzhev on 23 November. Novopetrovskoye in Tula Oblast was the target on 21 December. No losses were listed for the group from 25 December 1941 to mid-March 1942. It maintained raids over Rzhev but listed zero aircraft on strength, perhaps because of refitting on 1 March, but is known to have carried out attacks against Soviet partisans.

I. Gruppe reported 22 Ju 88s fit for combat in April. It was based at Sarabus in the Crimea via Kharkov and arrived there from 7–14 May. The group supported the 11th Army advance into the Crimea. It rapidly redeployed to Kharkov via Zaporozhye on 14 May. KG 76 supported the counter offensive at the Izyum salient in the Second Battle of Kharkov from 15 to 27 May. It operated under the Fliegerkorps IV commanded by Kurt Pflugbeil. On 18 May Pflugbeil's command destroyed 130 tanks and 500 other vehicles. The following day it claimed another 29 tanks destroyed. As the battle came to a close, the tightly packed and trapped Soviet forces were defeated in detail. Fliegerkorps IV claimed 596 aircraft in the air and 19 on the ground during the battle. 227 tanks, 3,083 motor vehicles, 24 artillery batteries, 49 artillery pieces, two anti-aircraft batteries, 22 locomotives and six trains for the cost of 49 aircraft.

The group then moved to Sarabus, returning to Fliegerkorps VIII. It bombed Sevastopol and then attacked the port facilities at Novorossisk over 31 May–3 July 1942. O 1 July, fearing Sevastopol would be evacuated at the last minute the Luftwaffe sent 78 bombers—from I./KG 76, 1./KG 100, and 40 Ju 87s from StG 77, escorted by 40 Messerschmitt Bf 109s. For the loss of only one bomber, the Tashkent, and the transports Ukrania, Proletariy and Elbrus were sunk. The salvage vessel Chernomor, the schooner Dnestr, two torpedo boats and a patrol boat. In addition the destroyers Soobrazitelny and Nezamozhnik, patrol vessels Shkval and Shtorm, one gunboat, one torpedo boat, two transports, and a floating dock sustained various degrees of damage. On 2 July it sank the Soviet Navy destroyer Bditelny and damaged the Soviet cruiser Komintern. It was assisted by III Gruppe. It patrolled the Black Sea and bombed Novorossisk from 1–27 June. The Red Air Force responded with night attacks on German airfields. KG 76 suffered "continuous aircraft losses."

KG 76 supported Case Blue, which began on 28 June. On 9 July KG 76 carried out successful bombing operations against Yelets and the rail yards at Tambov and Povorino. III. Gruppe supported the drive to Voronezh from the beginning of the offensive to 16 July. From 17 July it flew bombing operations supporting the advance to the Don river and Kalach. II. Gruppe opened the offensive based at Kursk. It is known to have attack targets in and around Lipetsk on 7 July. From 9 July it may have supported the bombing raids on Yelets and rail junctions at Tambov and Povorino in support of the 4th Panzer Army. It moved to Belyy Kolodez and onto Tatsinskaya Airfield on 8/9 August 1942. From here it took part in the Battle of Stalingrad and the advance to the Caucasus. It also attacked Soviet shipping along the Volga River. It flew operations as far eastward as Astrakhan and Grozny from 10 August to mid-November. Operating east of Stalingrad on 21 August, KG 76 (probably II Gruppe) attacked and destroyed two Red Army reserve divisions caught in the open. Richthofen wrote in his diary "blood flowed!". The wing was present during the opening carpet bombing attacks against the city on 23 August.

After the fall of Voronezh KG 76 provided effective support for the 2nd Army by flying sorties against Soviet airfields. After the 9 July, to the end of the battle on 24 July, KG 76, KG 27 and II./JG 77 were the only air units left to support Axis forces. The assortment of groups were renamed Gefechtsverband Nord and placed under the command of Alfred Bülowius. The ad hoc group were used as emergency reinforcements. On 20 July, with Voronezh fall imminent, KG 27 and 76 had been sent southward to assist in the Battle of Rostov only to be rushed back to the area when a Soviet offensive broke through German lines. KG 76 operated over at night. On a bombing operation over Saratov on 24 September, 7 staffel lost a Ju 88 shot down by the all-female 586th Fighter Aviation Regiment. It is believed Lt. Valeria Khomyakova was the Soviet pilot involved.

I./KG 76 flew against oil targets in Astrakhan and Grozny in September. By 20 September 1942 it had 19 of 24 Ju 88s operational. 1. and 2. Staffel were withdrawn to the north to support a planned assault on Leningrad (Operation Nordlicht). On 25 September it reported losses over the city. II. Gruppe could muster 39 Ju 88s with only 19 serviceable. The group also had lost squadrons to the cancelled Leningrad operation; they returned on 6 October 1942. Under the command of Luftflotte 4 it began operations in the Akhtuba on 19 October. From northern Caucasia it attack Soviet shipping in the port of Tuapse on 3 November. I. and II. Gruppe ceased operations on the 15 November 1942. III Gruppe staged their withdrawal over the course of two weeks, finally leaving the Eastern Front in early December 1942.

=== Mediterranean and African theatres ===
The unit took part in the Mediterranean, Middle East and African theatres. In November 1942 I., II., and III./KG 76 were transferred to Athens–Laon, Greece and from there moved to Crete. I Gruppe moved to support the Afrika Korps in North Africa. The theatre had changed considerably and KG 76 were part of an influx of air units to prevent an Axis collapse in the region. On 23 October 1942 the British Eighth Army began an offensive at El Alamein at broke through German-Italian lines on 4 November. Four days later, Anglo-American forces landed in Algeria and Morocco in Operation Torch. Axis forces were threatened with destruction in a large pincer move.

I Gruppe began bombing operations within a week but saw two changes in command. Hauptmann Hanns Heise was appointed the group commander in January 1942 but was succeeded by Major Rudolf Hallensleben in October 1942. Hallensleben was replaced by Major Ulrich Roch in January 1943. Missions were flown against Allied shipping off Tobruk and Benghazi. Allied ships were also targeted along the Egyptian coast to Alexandria from 23 November to 12 December 1942. The group reported 20 Ju 88s ready for action on 1 December. It transferred from Heraklion to Catania, Sicily. Under the command of Major Rudolf Hallensleben, it escorted Axis convoys between Italy and Africa. A shortage of transportation aircraft necessitated the use of the group to transport fuel to North Africa from 6 December. Some of its Staffeln conducted anti-submarine patrols by utilising its Ju 88s as Maritime patrol aircraft. Operations over Algeria and or Tunisia are known to have been flown until 10 December. It flew bombing operations over Tunisian ports and Algiers on 12 and 30 January. It bombed Algiers again on 2 March. The group bombed Tripoli. It was removed from operations from 12 to 17 March 1943 to Ansbach, Germany for rest and refit.

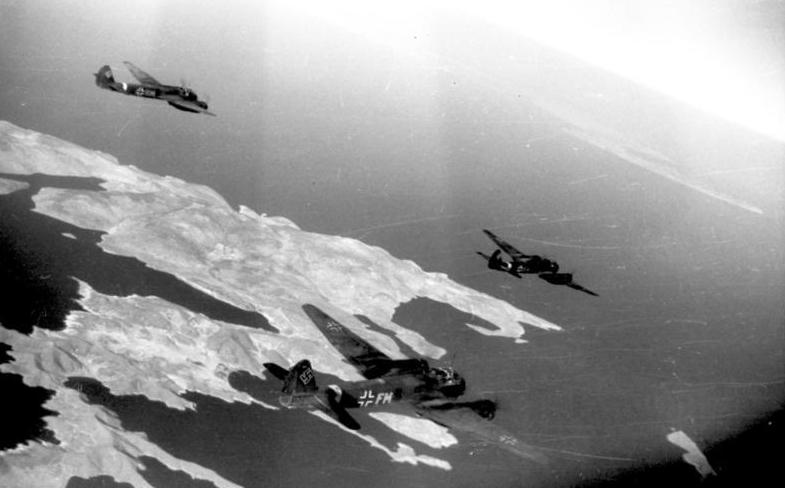
Ju 88s over Crete. KG 76 operated from the island over the winter, 1942/43

On 9 December it lost two Ju 88s in a collision during an air battle with No. 272 Squadron RAF Bristol Beaufighters. On 4 January 1943 another pilot was wounded. Another Ju 88 was lost and the pilot of another wounded in an attack on Thelepte airfield. USAAF Curtiss P-40 Warhawks of the 59th Fighter Squadron, 33rd Fighter Group intercepted. The Ju 88s managed to bomb the airfield damaging two P-40s. On the 15 January another loss was reported. Three days later on 18 January, Staffelkapitän of 1. Staffel, Günther Haussmann and his experiences crew were reported missing. After another loss on 22 January, 2. Staffel lost its commanding officer Oberleutnant Fritz Köhler. Another loss was reported on 8 and 21 February. On 3 and 5 March I. Gruppe lost an aircraft on each night. The latter loss was in the area No. 89 Squadron RAF night fighters operated.

II./KG 76 remained on operations until the 26 April 1943. It was based at Crete until 26 December 1942. Its base was bombed on 23 and 24 December. The group began operations over Algeria and the Battle of Tunisia. Béjaïa and Bône were bombed on 21 and 23 January. It attacked Tripoli on 14 and 26 February. On 3 March its staffeln attacked Algiers. The group sustained heavy losses and was reduced to only five crews by 15 April. The group's first known loss occurred on 21 January when it lost a Ju 88 to a No. 153 Squadron RAF night fighter and another was lost on 23 January. On 14 February the group sustained a loss to 89 Squadron. On 22 February 1943 the group lost its commanding officer Major Richard Meyer killed when he was shot down by Second Lieutenant Cochran from the US 96th Fighter Squadron. On night operations on 26/27 February the group lost another Ju 88 to 89 Squadron Beaufighters. A third was lost near Algiers on 3 March. On 31 March it lost two Ju 88s—the worst daily loss suffered over Africa. Before the group was withdrawn, it suffered two more losses; the last on 28 April.

III./KG 76 began attacking Allied shipping in the Eastern Mediterranean with 15 Ju 88s recorded on strength on 1 December. It struck at targets east of RAF Castel Benito on 19 December 1942. On 18 January 1943 it was forced to abandon its airfield at Tympakion (Crete) to Athens because of Allied air attacks. Until March it refitted and rested at Wiener Neustadt. It transferred to Sicily on 19 March and carried out night raids against Sfax in Tunisia on 27/28 March. Bombing raids against El Guettar in central Tunisia on 1 April, and Djaidoud-Metovia on 7 April. On 15 and 16 April it attacked Bŏne and Malta. Philippeville and Tripoli were the targets of bombing operations on 20 April and 3 May. On 16/17 May 1943 the group withdrew to Foggia in Italy.

On 16–17 May the group took part in raids on Allied airfields in Corsica. At Poretta airfield, it destroyed 25 Spitfires. An attack on Alesan airfield destroyed 30 B-25s and damaged another 45. The unit was withdrawn on 16 July 1943 to Laon-Athies in France. During these operations it lost two Gruppenkommandeur—Hauptmann Heinrich Schweitkhardt was posted missing in action on 9 January 1943 and Hauptmann Anton Stadler on 29 April 1943. Schweitkhardt reported his engine trouble after combat with No. 253 Squadron RAF 70 miles west of Zante Island at 13:08. He continued to broadcast until 13:54 until contact ceased. He never returned. On 9 April a Ju 88 was lost to the British ace Peter Wykeham. It lost another two Ju 88s which were covering a convoy on 19 April 15 miles northwest of Pantellaria. No. 229 Squadron RAF Spitfires with long-range tanks were likely their attackers. 12 Ju 88s were lost by the group over Africa.

=== Italian front ===
I./KG 76 returned to southern Europe in mid-May 1943. The group was ordered to attack Allied shipping in the Mediterranean Sea. The group was moved to Foggia in southern Italy. It began operations along the North African coast from 15 to 20 May, days after the capitulation of Axis forces in North Africa. On 28 May Allied bombers attacked the base and destroyed one Ju 88. Another eight were damaged. The following night it raided the port of Bône. On 30 May it lost another two Ju 88s in an air raid. The very next day another seven Ju 88s were damaged in air attack at Foggia. Operations continued on 1 June with raids in the Sousse area (1 and 10 June), Djidjelli (8 June), Bône (14 June). Six Ju 88s were sent to Sardinia on 24 June with instructions to attack any Allied landing. Bône was bombed again on 29 June in a bid to disrupt shipping, congregating for a landing in southern Europe. On 1 July 1943 it reported 26 Ju 88s ready for operations.

III. Gruppe also returned on 16 July. It moved to northern Italy near Milan by 1 July. It had 32 Ju 88s available for operations and then rebased to Grosseto over the course of 13–16 July. The group was commanded by Hauptmann Kurt Reiman, who had been appointed on 18 March to succeed Volprecht Freiherr von und zu Eisenbach Riedesel, relieved of command on 31 January 1943. III Gruppe was commanded by Albrecht Wichmann on 30 April 1943. III. Gruppe served in Italy for only a short time. On 16 July it was moved to France, at Laon-Athies.

The Italian Campaign began on 10 July 1943 with the invasion of Sicily. II./KG 76 began night attacks on Sicily because of Allied air superiority. The first attack was carried on 13/14 July, through to the 15th. The following day the group bombed Siracusa. It then deployed south to Foggia on the 18 July. It flew sorties in the Augusta harbour and the Catania area (23 and 27 July) and then it attacked Allied forces near Gela (28 July). On 30 July Avola was bombed. On this mission the Gruppenkommandeur Kurt Riemann was posted missing in action with his crew. He was not formally replaced until September when Hauptmann Siegfried Geisler took command—Geisler was the last commanding officer of II./KG 76.

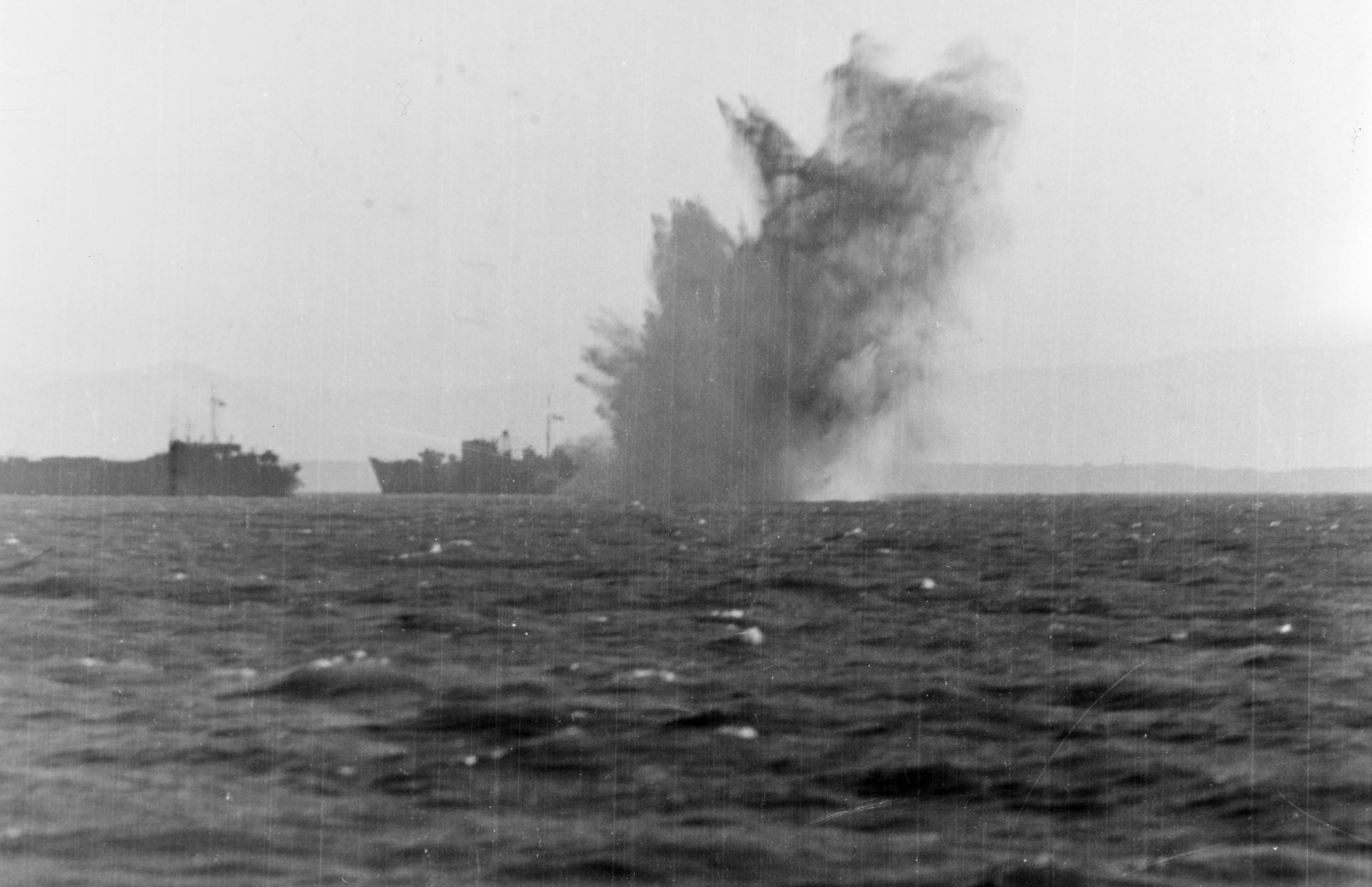
German air attack on Anzio landings, 22 January 1944.

II./KG 76 remained on operations and on 7 August attacked shipping and installations at Bizerte, Tunisia. It bombed targets in the Scordia on 11 August. Its base at Foggia was bombed on 16 August but it had 18 Ju 88s (16 operational) by 20 August. On 17 August Sicily fell. KG 76 continued to attack shipping and coastal targets. It bombed Palermo harbour on 23 August but lost nine Ju 88s at Foggia in an air attack two days later forcing a reduction in operations. I./KG 76 were also committed to battle. It raided Bizerte on 6 July and contested the Allied landings in Sicily from the first day: Gela (11 July), Gerbini (14 July), Siracusa (17 July), Bizerte (17 August). It had 20 Ju 88s (11 operational) on 20 August 1943 at Foggia. Its base was bombed on 25 August and 8 September but losses are unknown.

Operation Avalanche began on 3 September 1943 and KG 76 was called on to support Luftflotte 2's operations. On 8 and 9 September I Gruppe flew anti-shipping missions off the Salerno beachhead. It also flew operations over the sea off Naples (10 September). It was forced to abandon the base at Foggia and destroyed 14 Ju 88s to prevent their capture. The group moved to Istres, France, ending its participation in Italy. Gruppenkommandeur Ulrich Roch was killed in operations before the withdrawal: he was killed with his crew on 13 September and replaced by Hauptmann Hans Coyn twenty-four hours later.

II./KG 76 conducted attacks on the Salerno beachhead also on 13 and 16 September. Losses necessitated a temporary withdrawal from operation from 20 to 23 September. The Gruppe re-equipped and rested at Saint-Martin-de-Pallières, France. It moved back to Italy at Aviano. There, it attacked Allied shipping and targets over southern Italy; especially harbours. It was reassigned to Fliegerkorps II on 15 October 1943. Losses in air combat forced the group to operate at night mostly. It bombed Naples' harbour on 23 October and 5/6 and 26/27 November 1943. The group had 32 Ju 88 A-4s on strength by the time of withdrawal to Varrelbusch on 4 December 1943.

From Villaorba (Basiliano), I. Gruppe moved to Udine. It struck at ports over the following months: Naples and Bari were bombed by 15 October. Naples harbour was attacked again on 5 November while Bastia harbour in Corsica as attacked on 24 November. Hauptmann Hans Coyn was killed on 30 November Helmut Wahl replaced him. It is likely bombed Bari on 2/3 December and transferred piecemeal from Villaorba to Varrelbusch from 4–13 December 1943. The success over Bari on 2/3 December 1943 marked the last major victory of the German bomber arm in Italy. I Gruppe was split in two at Gablingen. Operation Shingle began at Anzio on 22 January 1944 and units were transferred back to Villaorba. The split remained from 22 January to 5 March 1944. The Italian contingent left Italy for the last time on 6–10 March for Linz, Austria, to convert to the Junkers Ju 188 and Messerschmitt Me 410.

Geisler's II Gruppe operated from Aviano over Anzio on 1 February 1944. 4 staffel was detached to Lézignan-Corbières, southeast of Toulouse to train as pathfinders. The unit joined 6 staffel at Istres, southern France and they conducted pathfinding operations from March to July 1944 against convoys. It marked convoy UGS 37 off the Algerian coast for KG 26 on 11/12 April 1944. 5 staffel bombed bridges at Venafro, near Casino on 17 May, the last recorded operation of the group in Italy

=== Western Front 1944–45 ===
I./KG 76 participated in night raids over Great Britain during Operation Steinbock. The group had 33 Ju 88s with 31 serviceable on 21 January 1944. Some of its elements left for the Mediterranean to start operations over Anzio. The element in Mediterranean left for Linz, Austria to convert to the Junkers Ju 188 and Messerschmitt Me 410. It was later decided to convert the unit to the Arado Ar 234 on 7 June. However this was never carried out, and I./KG 76 was disbanded in July 1944.

I./KG 76 Varrelbusch to Laon before the start of the Steinbock offensive, because of the danger of RAF night fighter intruders. On 22 January 1944, the Waterloo area of London was ordered as the target. 18 bombers were lost. KG 76 lost one Ju 88A-4, belonging to 3 Staffel: Leutnant Ernst Rethfeldt and his crew were killed on a transfer flight. Three of its aircraft failed to return from the second wave that night: two fell to anti-aircraft artillery: one from 1 Staffel and two from 3 Staffel. Another 2 Staffel Ju 88 was lost on the night of the 29/30 January, the last of KG 76's known losses in the failed operation.

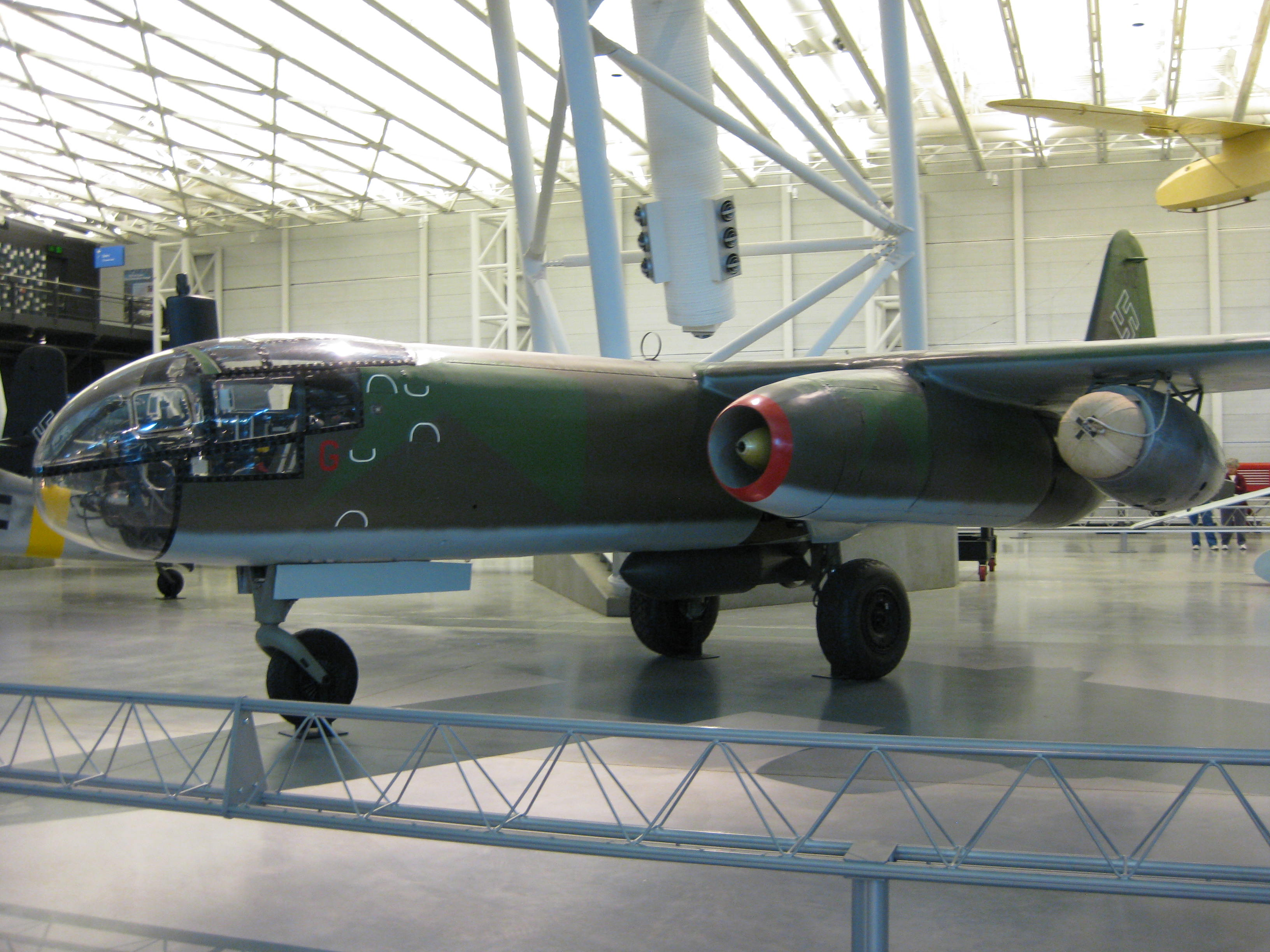
The sole preserved Arado Ar 234, which served with KG 76 in Norway.

The Kampfgeschwader began conversion to the Ar 234 in June 1944. III./KG 76 was the first unit to receive the Ar 234, and received the first two on 26 August. By 1 December 1944 it had 51 of these machines on strength, nearly one-quarter of the entire number of Ar 234 production aircraft to ever be built. III./KG 76 operated over France and the Low Countries until the end of the war. It flew some of the first jet bomber missions in history on 24 December 1944 against rail targets in Namur, Belgium. Troop concentrations were attacked around Liège and Bastogne on 26 and 31 December respectively, in support of German forces during the Battle of the Bulge. The unit also flew reconnaissance missions over Antwerp's docks and airfields on 1 January 1945 during Operation Bodenplatte. On 20 January 1945 Ar 234s struck the docks at Antwerp, and struck again on 24 January 1945, which was the wing's last independent mission. Missions were flown against rail targets in the Brussels area on 8 February, and attacked Allied fores around Eindhoven on 21 February.

The unit also attacked the Ludendorf Bridge at Remagen from 9–13 March. KG 76 reported high losses during this period. On 21 March their base at Achmer was bombed. 10 Ar 234s were lost and a further 8 damaged. By 1 April 1945 the group had just 11 machines on strength, with seven serviceable and 27 pilots of which 16 were ready for action. III./KG 76 received five Ar 234s on 10 April.

Records indicate that on 12 April strength was 15 aircraft of which 10 were serviceable and 31 (18 ready for action) pilots. The Gruppe spent most of April attacking targets on German soil, against the advancing Allied forces. On 20 April 1945 Ar 234s of III./KG 76 struck at Soviet targets in the Berlin area. 8 Staffel of III./KG 76 flew the Kampfgeschwader's last sortie of the war on 3 May 1945. II./KG 76 also participated in the last battles of the war. The unit had not fully converted to the Ar 234, and still flew the He 111. A mixed group of these aircraft struck at Soviet forces in the Küstrin area. Most of the unit was moved to confront the Western Allies in Western Germany. Targets included marshalling yards, airfields bridges and ground forces. Based at Hesepe, the airfield was attacked on 21 March, killed 11 and wounding 10 of the units personnel. II./KG 76 continued to resist British armoured advances until the 15 April. With just 18 pilots left the Gruppe handed over its remaining aircraft to III./KG 76 and all remaining personnel joined the Geschwaderstab/KG 76. No further missions were flown by the Gruppe after this date. The Gruppe surrendered to Royal Air Force personnel at Schleswig airfield on 8 May 1945.

== Commanding officers ==
- Oberst Stefan Fröhlich, 17 November 1939 – 26 February 1941
- Oberst Ernst Bormann, 26 February 1941 – 7 January 1943
- Oberstleutnant Rudolf Hallensleben, January 1943 – 31 May 1944
- Oberst Walter Storp, 1 June 1944 – 30 September 1944
- Oberstleutnant Robert Kowalewski, November 1944 – 8 May 1945
