= Franz Reuß =

- Born: 17 April 1904
- Died: 5 June 1992 (aged 88)
- Military career
- Allegiance: Nazi Germany
- Branch: Luftwaffe
- Rank: Generalmajor
- Commands: 4th Air Division
- Conflicts: World War II
- Awards: Knight's Cross of the Iron Cross

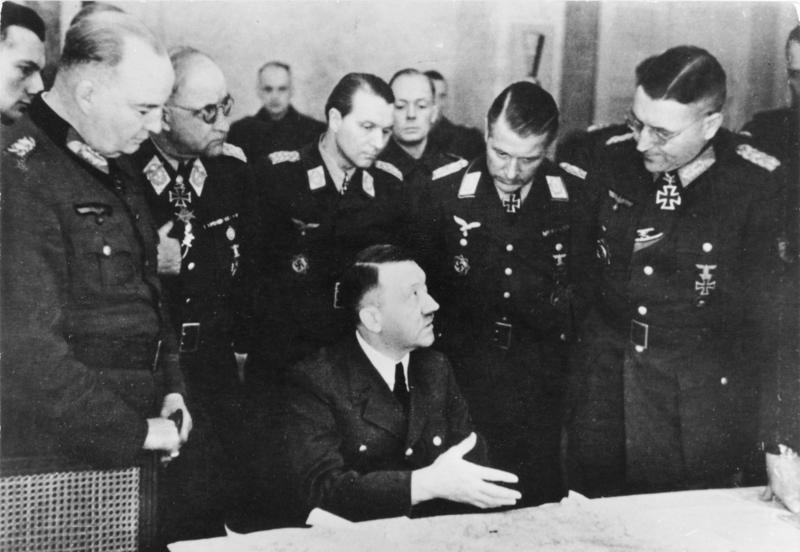
Federal Archives Image 146-1971-033-33, briefing at the headquarters of Army Group Weichsel.jpg

Franz Reuß (17 April 1904 – 5 June 1992) was a general in the Luftwaffe of Nazi Germany during World War II. He was awarded the Knight's Cross of the Iron Cross in July 1944.

== Awards ==
- German Cross in Gold on 21 August 1942 as Oberstleutnant i.G. (in the general staff) in the Stab/IV. Flieger-Korps
- Knight's Cross of the Iron Cross on 18 July 1944 as Generalmajor and commander of the 4.Flieger-Division

Military offices
Preceded by Generalleutnant Hermann Plocher	Commander of 4. Flieger-Division; 25 August 1943 – 5 April 1945	Succeeded by —
