= Second Battle of Kharkov =

1942 battle in the Eastern Front of World War II

- Part of the Eastern Front of World War II
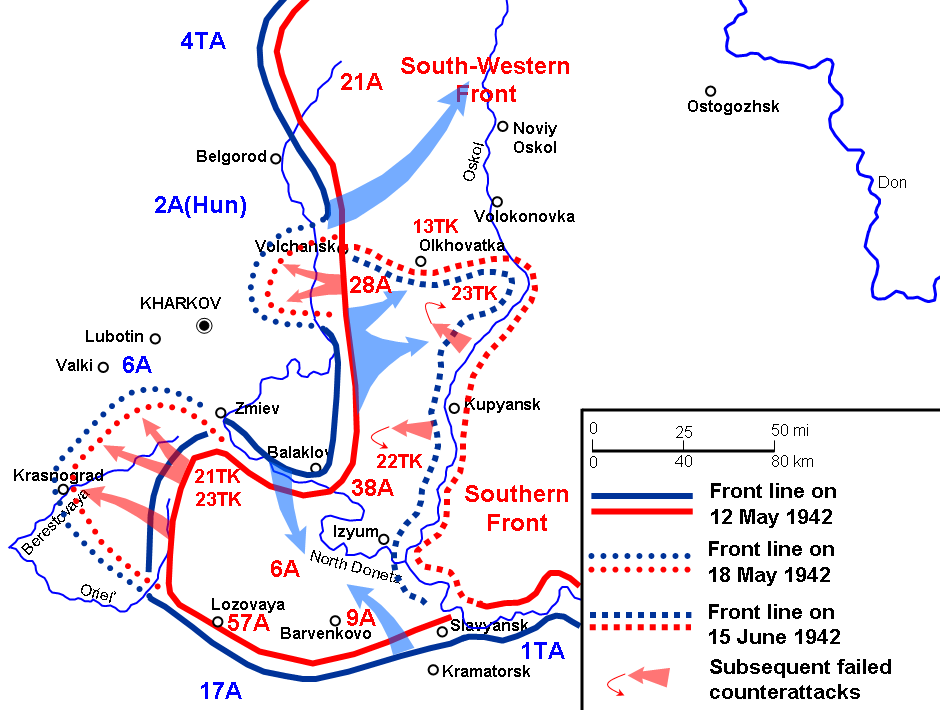
- Operations in eastern Ukraine from 12 May to 15 June 1942
Date	12–28 May 1942 (2 weeks and 2 days)
Location	Izium/Barvenkovo area, Kharkov Oblast, Ukrainian SSR, Soviet Union
Result	Axis victory

Belligerents
Germany; Romania; Hungary; Italy; Slovakia; Croatia	Soviet Union

Commanders and leaders
(Nazi Germany) Fedor von Bock (Nazi Germany) Ewald von Kleist (Nazi Germany) Friedrich Paulus (Nazi Germany) Kurt Pflugbeil	(Soviet Union) Semyon Timoshenko (Soviet Union) Ivan Bagramyan

Strength
350,000 men 447 tanks 40 assault guns 27 tank destroyers 591 aircraft	12 May: 765,300 men 1,176 tanks 300 self-propelled guns 1,154 guns and howitzers 1,700 mortars 926 aircraft

Casualties and losses
~20,000–30,000 men 108 tanks destroyed 49 aircraft destroyed 12 airmen killed 98 airmen missing	277,190 men 170,958 killed, missing or captured 106,232 wounded 1,250 tanks destroyed 1,648–2,086 guns and howitzers lost 3,278 mortars lost 542 aircraft destroyed 57,000 horses

The Second Battle of Kharkov or Operation Fredericus was an Axis counter-offensive in the region around Kharkov against the Red Army Izium bridgehead offensive conducted 12–28 May 1942, on the Eastern Front during World War II. Its objective was to eliminate the Izium bridgehead over Seversky Donets or the "Barvenkovo bulge" (Russian: Барвенковский выступ, romanized: Barvenkovsky vystup) which was one of the Soviet offensive's staging areas. After a winter counter-offensive that drove German troops away from Moscow but depleted the Red Army's reserves, the Kharkov offensive was a new Soviet attempt to expand upon their strategic initiative, although it failed to secure a significant element of surprise.

On 12 May 1942, Soviet forces under the command of Marshal Semyon Timoshenko launched an offensive against the German 6th Army from a salient established during the winter counter-offensive. After a promising start, the offensive was stopped on 15 May by massive airstrikes. Critical Soviet errors by several staff officers and by Joseph Stalin, who failed to accurately estimate the 6th Army's potential and overestimated their own newly raised forces, facilitated a German pincer attack on 17 May which cut off three Soviet field armies from the rest of the front by 22 May. Hemmed into a narrow area, the 250,000-strong Soviet force inside the pocket was hit from all sides by German armored, artillery and machine gun firepower as well as 7,700 tonnes of air-dropped bombs. After six days of encirclement, Soviet resistance ended, with the remaining troops being killed or surrendering.

The battle was an overwhelming German victory, with 280,000 Soviet casualties compared to just 20,000 for the Germans and their allies. The German Army Group South pressed its advantage, encircling the Soviet 28th Army on 13 June in Operation Wilhelm and pushing back the 38th and 9th Armies on 22 June in Operation Fredericus II as preliminary operations to Case Blue, which was launched on 28 June as the main German offensive on the Eastern Front in 1942.

== Background ==
=== General situation on the Eastern Front ===
By late February 1942, the Soviet winter counter-offensive had pushed German forces from Moscow on a broad front and then ended in mutual exhaustion. Stalin was convinced that the Germans were finished and would collapse by the spring or summer of 1942, as he said in his speech of 7 November 1941. Stalin decided to exploit this perceived weakness on the Eastern Front by launching a new offensive in the spring. Stalin's decision faced objections from his advisors, including the chief of the Red Army General Staff, General Boris Shaposhnikov, and generals Aleksandr Vasilevsky and Georgy Zhukov, who argued for a more defensive strategy. Vasilevsky wrote "Yes, we were hoping for [German reserves to run out], but the reality was more harsh than that". According to Zhukov, Stalin believed that the Germans were able to carry out operations simultaneously along two strategic axes, he was sure that the opening of a spring offensives along the entire front would destabilise the German Army, before it had a chance to initiate what could be a mortal offensive blow on Moscow. Despite the caution urged by his generals, Stalin decided to try to keep the German forces off-balance through "local offensives".

=== Choosing the strategy ===
After the conclusion of the winter offensive, Stalin and the Soviet Armed Forces General Staff (Stavka) believed that the eventual German offensives would aim for Moscow, and also with a big offensive to the south, mirroring Operation Barbarossa and Operation Typhoon in 1941. Although the Stavka believed that the Germans had been defeated before Moscow, the seventy divisions which faced Moscow remained a threat. Stalin, most generals and front commanders believed that the principal effort would be a German offensive towards Moscow. Emboldened by the success of the winter offensive, Stalin was convinced that local offensives in the area would wear down German forces, weakening German efforts to mount another operation to take Moscow. Stalin had agreed to prepare the Red Army for an "active strategic defence" but later gave orders for the planning of seven local offensives, stretching from the Baltic Sea to the Black Sea. One area was Kharkov, where action was originally ordered for March.

Early that month, the Stavka issued orders to Southwestern Strategic Direction headquarters for an offensive in the region, after the victories following the Rostov Strategic Offensive Operation (27 November – 2 December 1941) and the Barvenkovo–Lozovaya Offensive Operation (18–31 January 1942) in the Donbas region. The forces of Marshal Semyon Timoshenko and Lieutenant General Kirill Moskalenko penetrated German positions along the northern Donets River, east of Kharkov. Fighting continued into April, with Moskalenko crossing the river and establishing a tenuous bridgehead at Izium. In the south, the Soviet 6th Army had limited success defending against German forces, which managed to keep a bridgehead of their own on the east bank of the river. Catching the attention of Stalin, it set the pace for the prelude to the eventual offensive intended to reach Pavlohrad and Sinelnikovo and eventually Kharkov and Poltava.

By 15 March, Soviet commanders introduced preliminary plans for an offensive towards Kharkov, assisted by a large number of reserves. On 20 March, Timoshenko held a conference in Kupiansk to discuss the offensive and a report to Moscow, prepared by Timoshenko's chief of staff, Lieutenant General Ivan Baghramian, summed up the conference, although arguably leaving several key intelligence features out. The build-up of Soviet forces in the region of Barvenkovo and Vovchansk continued well into the beginning of May. Final details were settled following discussions between Stalin, Stavka and the leadership of the Southwestern Strategic Direction led by Timoshenko throughout March and April, with one of the final Stavka directives issued on 17 April.

== Prelude ==
=== Soviet order of battle ===
By 11 May 1942, the Red Army was able to allocate six armies under two fronts, amongst other formations. The Southwestern Front had the 21st Army, 28th Army, 38th Army and the 6th Army. By 11 May, the 21st Tank Corps had been moved into the region with the 23rd Tank Corps, with another 269 tanks. There were also three independent rifle divisions and a rifle regiment from the 270th Rifle Division, concentrated in the area, supported by the 2nd Cavalry Corps in Bogdanovka. The Soviet Southern Front had the 57th and 9th armies, along with thirty rifle divisions, a rifle brigade and the 24th Tank Corps, the 5th Cavalry Corps and three Guards rifle divisions. At its height, the Southern Front could operate eleven guns or mortars per kilometre of front.

Forces regrouping in the sector ran into the rasputitsa, which turned much of the soil into mud. This caused severe delays in the preparations and made reinforcing the Southern and Southwestern Front take longer than expected. Senior Soviet representatives criticised the front commanders for poor management of forces, an inability to stage offensives and for their armchair generalship. Because the regrouping was done so haphazardly, the Germans received some warning of Soviet preparations. Moskalenko, the commander of the 38th Army, placed the blame on the fact that the fronts did not plan in advance to regroup and showed a poor display of front management. (He commented afterwards that it was no surprise that the "German-Fascist command divined our plans".)

=== Soviet leadership and manpower ===
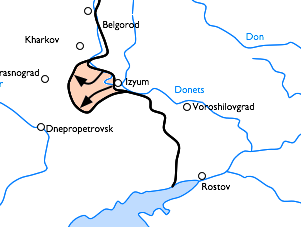
Eastern front in May 1942 (Izyum salient in pink)

The primary Soviet leader was Timoshenko, a veteran of World War I and the Russian Civil War. Timoshenko had achieved some success at the Battle of Smolensk in 1941 but was eventually defeated. Timoshenko orchestrated the victory at Rostov during the winter counter-attacks and more success in the spring offensive at Kharkov before the battle itself. Overseeing the actions of the army was Military Commissar Nikita Khrushchev.

The average Soviet soldier suffered from inexperience. With the Soviet debacle of the previous year ameliorated only by the barest victory at Moscow, most of the original manpower of the Red Army had been killed, wounded or captured by the Germans, with casualties of almost 1,000,000 just from the Battle of Moscow. The typical soldier in the Red Army was a conscript and had little to no combat experience, and tactical training was practically nonexistent. The Red Army also began to suffer from the loss of Soviet industrial areas, and a temporary strategic defence was considered necessary.

The General Chief of Staff, Marshal Vasilevsky, recognised that the Soviet Army of 1942 was not ready to conduct major offensive operations against the well-trained German army, because it did not have quantitative and qualitative superiority and because leadership was being rebuilt after the defeats of 1941. (This analysis is retrospective and is an analysis of Soviet conduct during their strategic offensives in 1942, and even beyond, such as Operation Mars in October 1942 and the Battle of Târgul Frumos in May 1944.)

=== German preparations ===
Unknown to the Soviet forces, the German 6th Army, under the newly appointed General Paulus, was issued orders for Operation Fredericus on 30 April 1942. This operation was to crush the Soviet armies within the Izyum salient south of Kharkov, created during the Soviet spring offensives in March and April. The final directive for this offensive, issued on 30 April, gave a start date of 18 May.

The Germans had made a major effort to reinforce Army Group South, and transferred Field Marshal Fedor von Bock, former commander of Army Group Center during Operation Barbarossa and Operation Typhoon. On 5 April 1942, Hitler issued Directive 41, which made the south the main area of operations under Case Blue, the summer campaign, at the expense of the other fronts. The divisions of Army Group South were brought up to full strength in late April and early May. The strategic objective was illustrated after the victories of Erich von Manstein and the 11th Army in the Crimea. The main objective remained the Caucasus, its oil fields and as a secondary objective, the city of Stalingrad.

The plan to begin Operation Fredericus in April led to more forces being allocated to the area of the German 6th Army. Unknown to the Soviet forces, the German army was regrouping in the center of operations for the offensive around Kharkov. On 10 May, Paulus submitted his final draft of Operation Fredericus and feared a Soviet attack. By then, the German army opposite Timoshenko was ready for the operation towards the Caucasus.

== Soviet offensive ==
=== Initial success ===
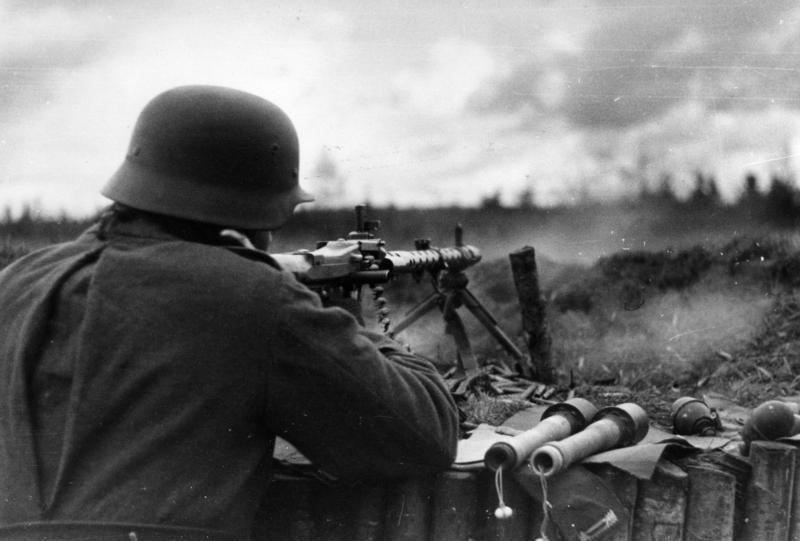
German machine gunner with MG 34 on the Eastern Front in 1942

The Red Army offensive began at 6:30 a.m. on 12 May 1942, led by a concentrated hour-long artillery bombardment and a final twenty-minute air attack upon German positions. The ground offensive began with a dual pincer movement from the Volchansk and Barvenkovo salients at 7:30 am. The German defences were knocked out by air raids, artillery-fire and coordinated ground attacks. The fighting was so fierce that the Soviets inched forward their second echelon formations, preparing to throw them into combat as well. Fighting was particularly ferocious near the Soviet village of Nepokrytaia, where the Germans launched three local counter-attacks. The Luftwaffe's fighter aircraft, despite their numerical inferiority, quickly defeated the Soviet air units in the airspace above the battle area, but without bombers, dive-bombers and ground-attack aircraft they could only strafe with their machine guns, drop small bombs on Soviet supply columns, and pin down infantry. By dark, the deepest Soviet advance was 10 kilometres (6.2 mi). Moskalenko, commander of the 38th Army, discovered the movement of several German reserve units and realised that the attack had been opposed by two German divisions, not the one expected, indicating poor Soviet reconnaissance and intelligence-gathering before the battle. A captured diary of a dead German general alluded to the Germans knowing about Soviet plans in the region.

Next day Paulus obtained three infantry divisions and a panzer division for the defence of Kharkov and the Soviet advance was slow, achieving little success except on the left flank. Bock had warned Paulus not to counter-attack without air support, although this was later reconsidered, when several Soviet tank brigades broke through VIII Corps (General Walter Heitz) in the Volchansk sector, only 19 kilometres (12 mi) from Kharkov. In the first 72 hours the 6th Army lost 16 battalions conducting holding actions and local counter-attacks in the heavy rain and mud. By 14 May the Red Army had made impressive gains, but several Soviet divisions were so depleted that they were withdrawn and Soviet tank reserves were needed to defeat the German counter-attacks; German losses were estimated to be minimal, with only 35–70 tanks believed to have been knocked out in the 3rd and 23rd Panzer divisions.

=== Luftwaffe ===
Hitler immediately turned to the Luftwaffe to help blunt the offensive. At this point, its close support corps was deployed in Crimea, taking part in the siege of Sevastopol. Under the command of Wolfram von Richthofen, the 8th Air Corps was initially ordered to deploy to Kharkov from Crimea, but this order was rescinded. In an unusual move, Hitler kept it in Crimea, but did not put the corps under the command of Luftflotte 4 (Air Fleet 4), which already contained 4th Air Corps, under the command of General Kurt Pflugbeil, and Fliegerführer Süd (Flying Command South), a small anti-shipping command based in Crimea. Instead, he allowed Richthofen to take charge of all operations over Sevastopol. The siege in Crimea was not over, and the Battle of the Kerch Peninsula had not yet been won. Hitler was pleased with the progress there and content to keep Richthofen where he was, but he withdrew close support assets from Fliegerkorps VIII in order to prevent a Soviet breakthrough at Kharkov. The use of the Luftwaffe to compensate for the German Army's lack of firepower suggested to Richthofen that the Oberkommando der Wehrmacht (OKW, "High Command of the Armed Forces") saw the Luftwaffe mainly as a ground support arm. This angered Richthofen who complained that the Luftwaffe was treated as "the army's whore". Now that he was not being redeployed to Kharkov, Richthofen also complained about the withdrawal of his units from the ongoing Kerch and Sevastopol battles. He felt that the transfer of aerial assets to Kharkov made victory in Crimea uncertain. In reality, the Soviet units at Kerch were already routed and the Axis position at Sevastopol was comfortable.

Despite Richthofen's opposition, powerful air support was on its way to bolster the 6th Army and this news boosted German morale. Army commanders, such as Paulus and Bock, placed so much confidence in the Luftwaffe that they ordered their forces not to risk an attack without air support. In the meantime, Fliegerkorps IV, was forced to use every available aircraft. Although meeting more numerous Soviet air forces, the Luftwaffe achieved air superiority and limited the German ground forces' losses to Soviet aviation, but with some crews flying more than 10 missions per day. By 15 May, Pflugbeil was reinforced and received Kampfgeschwader 27 (Bomber Wing 27, or KG 27), Kampfgeschwader 51 (KG 51), Kampfgeschwader 55 (KG 55) and Kampfgeschwader 76 (KG 76) equipped with Junkers Ju 88 and Heinkel He 111 bombers. Sturzkampfgeschwader 77 (Dive Bomber Wing 77, or StG 77) also arrived to add direct ground support. Pflugbeil now had 10 bomber, six fighter and four Junkers Ju 87 Stuka Gruppen (Groups). Logistical difficulties meant that only 54.5 per cent were operational at any given time.

=== German defence ===
German close air support made its presence felt immediately on 15 May, forcing units such as the Soviet 38th Army onto the defensive. It ranged over the front, operating dangerously close to the changing frontline. Air interdiction and direct ground support damaged Soviet supply lines and rear areas, also inflicting large losses on their armoured formations. General Franz Halder praised the air strikes as being primarily responsible for breaking the Soviet offensive. The Soviet air force could do very little to stop Pflugbeil's 4th Air Corps. It not only attacked the enemy but also carried out vital supply missions. Bombers dropped supplies to encircled German units, which could continue to hold out until a counter-offensive relieved them. The 4th Air Corps anti-aircraft units also used their high-velocity 8.8 cm guns on the Soviet ground forces. Over the course of the 16-day battle the 4th Air Corps played a major role in the German victory, conducting 15,648 sorties (978 per day), dropping 7,700 tonnes of bombs on the Soviet forces and lifting 1,545 tonnes of material to the front.

On 14 May, the Germans continued to attack Soviet positions in the north in localised offensives and by then, the Luftwaffe had gained air superiority over the Kharkov sector, forcing Timoshenko to move his own aircraft forward to counter the bolstered Luftflotte 4. The Luftwaffe won air superiority over their numerically superior, but technically inferior opponents. The air battles depleted the Soviet fighter strength, allowing the German strike aircraft the chance to influence the land battle even more. Nonetheless, the Soviet forces pushed on, disengaging from several minor battles and changing the direction of their thrusts. However, in the face of continued resistance and local counterattacks, the Soviet attack ebbed, especially when combined with the invariably heavy air raids. By the end of the day, the 28th Army could no longer conduct offensive operations against German positions.

Soviet troops in the northern pincer suffered even more than those in the south. They achieved spectacular success the first three days of combat, with a deep penetration of German positions. The Red Army routed several key German battalions, including many with Hungarian and other foreign soldiers. The success of the Southern Shock group, however, has been attributed to the fact that the early penetrations in the north had directed German reserves there, thus limiting the reinforcements to the south. But, by 14 May, Hitler had briefed General Ewald von Kleist and ordered his 1st Panzer Army to grab the initiative in a bold counteroffensive, setting the pace for the final launching of Operation Fridericus.

=== Second phase of the offensive ===
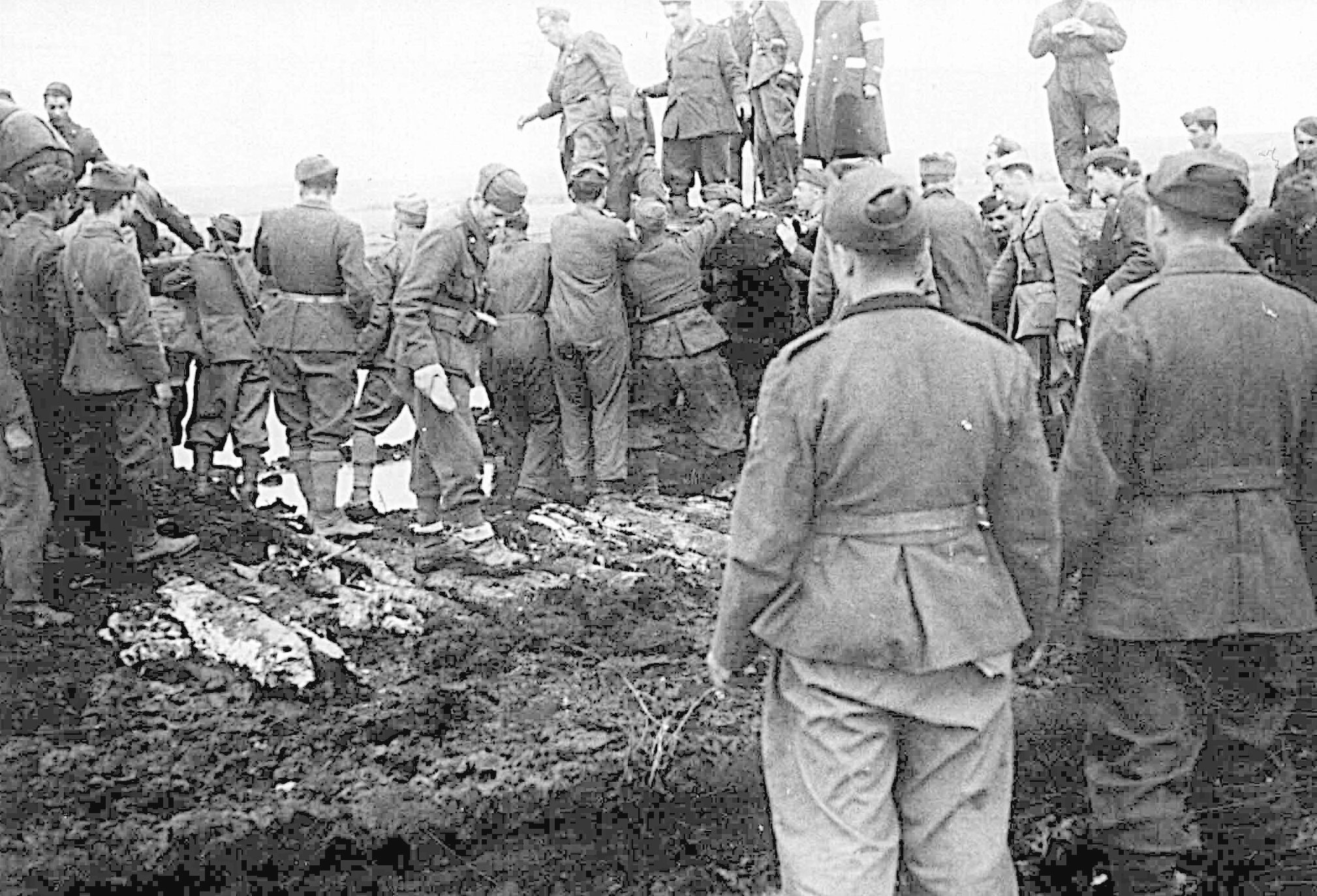
Italians repairing a road damaged by a Soviet attack during the battle.

On 15 and 16 May, another attempted Soviet offensive in the north met the same resistance encountered on the three first days of the battle. German bastions continued to hold out against Soviet assaults. The major contribution to Soviet frustration in the battle was the lack of heavy artillery, which ultimately prevented the taking of heavily defended positions. One of the best examples of this was the defence of Ternovaya, where defending German units absolutely refused to surrender. The fighting was so harsh that, after advancing an average of five kilometres, the offensive stopped for the day in the north. The next day saw a renewal of the Soviet attack, which was largely blocked by counterattacks by German tanks; the tired Soviet divisions could simply not hold their own against the concerted attacks from the opposition. The south, however, achieved success, much like the earlier days of the battle, although Soviet forces began to face heavier air strikes from German aircraft.

The Germans, on the other hand, had spent the day fighting holding actions in both sectors, launching small counterattacks to whittle away at Soviet offensive potential, while continuously moving up reinforcements from the south, including several aircraft squadrons transferred from the Crimea. Poor decisions by the 150th Rifle Division, which had successfully crossed the Barvenkovo River, played a major part in the poor exploitation of the tactical successes of the southern shock group. Timoshenko was unable to choose a point of main effort for his advancing troops, preferring a broad-front approach instead. The Germans traded space for time, which suited their intentions well.

=== 1st Panzer Army counterattacks ===
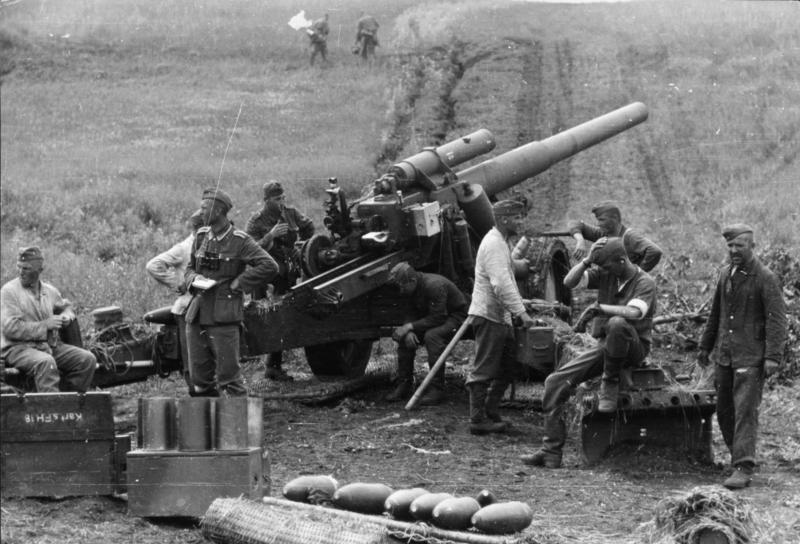
German 15 cm sFH 18 howitzer with crew in 1942 on the Eastern Front.

On 17 May, supported by Fliegerkorps IV, the German army took the initiative, as Kleist's 3rd Panzer Corps and 44th Army Corps began a counterattack on the Barvenkovo bridgehead from the area of Aleksandrovka in the south. Aided greatly by air support, Kleist was able to crush Soviet positions and advanced up to ten kilometres in the first day of the attack. Soviet troop and supply convoys were easy targets for ferocious Luftwaffe attacks, possessing few anti-aircraft guns and having left their rail-heads 100 kilometres to the rear. German reconnaissance aircraft monitored enemy movements, directed attack aircraft to Soviet positions and corrected German artillery fire. The response time of the 4th Air Corps to calls for air strikes was excellent, only 20 minutes. Many of the Soviet units were sent to the rear that night to be refitted, while others were moved forward to reinforce tenuous positions across the front. That same day, Timoshenko reported the move to Moscow and asked for reinforcements and described the day's failures. Vasilevsky's attempts to gain approval for a general withdrawal were rejected by Stalin.

On 18 May, the situation worsened and Stavka suggested once more stopping the offensive and ordered the 9th Army to break out of the salient. Timoshenko and Khrushchev claimed that the danger coming from the Wehrmacht's Kramatorsk group was exaggerated, and Stalin refused the withdrawal again. The consequences of losing the air battle were also apparent. On 18 May the Fliegerkorps IV destroyed 130 tanks and 500 motor vehicles, while adding another 29 tanks destroyed on 19 May.

On 19 May, Paulus, on orders from Bock, began a general offensive from the area of Merefa in the north of the bulge in an attempt to encircle the remaining Soviet forces in the Izium salient. Only then did Stalin authorise Zhukov to stop the offensive and fend off German flanking forces. However, it was already too late. Quickly, the Germans achieved considerable success against Soviet defensive positions. The 20 May saw more of the same, with the German forces closing in from the rear. More German divisions were committed to the battle that day, shattering several Soviet counterparts, allowing the Germans to press forward. The Luftwaffe also intensified operations over the Donets River to prevent Soviet forces escaping. Ju 87s from StG 77 destroyed five of the main bridges and damaged four more while Ju 88 bombers from Kampfgeschwader 3 (KG 3) inflicted heavy losses on retreating motorised and armoured columns.

Although Timoshenko's forces successfully regrouped on 21 May, he ordered a withdrawal of Army Group Kotenko by the end of 22 May, while he prepared an attack for 23 May, to be orchestrated by the 9th and 57th Armies. Although the Red Army desperately attempted to fend off advancing Wehrmacht and launched local counterattacks to relieve several surrounded units, they generally failed. By the end of May 24, Soviet forces opposite Kharkov had been surrounded by German formations, which had been able to transfer several more divisions to the front, increasing the pressure on the Soviet flanks and finally forcing them to collapse.

=== Soviet break-out attempts ===
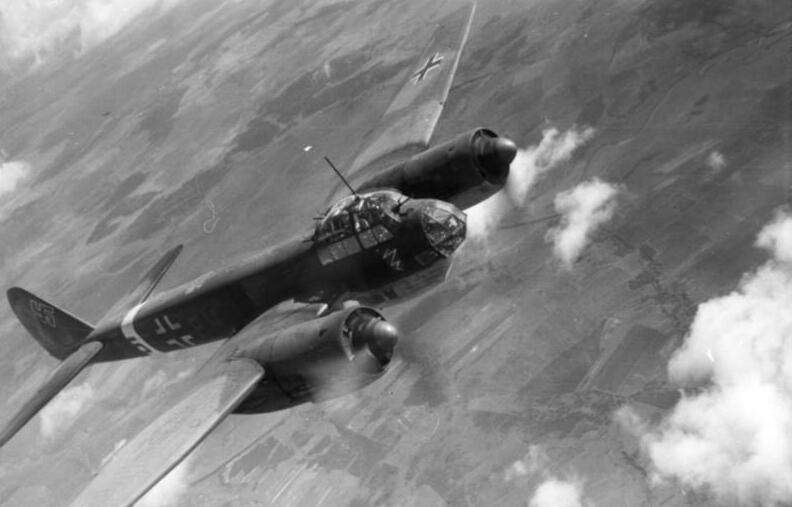
Ju 88 from KG 3 in flight over Russia in 1942.

The 25 May saw the first major Soviet attempt to break the encirclement. German Major General Hubert Lanz described the attacks as gruesome, made en masse. Driven by blind courage, the Soviet soldiers charged at German machine guns with their arms linked, shouting "Urray!". The German machine gunners had no need for accuracy, killing hundreds in quick bursts of fire. In broad daylight, the Luftwaffe, now enjoying complete air supremacy and the absence of Soviet anti-aircraft guns, rained down SD2 anti-personnel cluster bombs on the exposed Soviet infantry masses, killing them in droves.

By 26 May, the surviving Red Army soldiers were forced into crowded positions in an area of roughly fifteen square kilometres. Soviet attempts to break through the German encirclement in the east were continuously blocked by tenacious defensive manoeuvres and German air power. Groups of Soviet tanks and infantry that attempted to escape and succeeded in breaking through German lines were caught and destroyed by Ju 87s from StG 77. The flat terrain secured easy observation for the Germans, whose forward observers directed long-range 10.5 cm and 15 cm artillery fire onto the Soviets from a safe distance to conserve the German infantrymen. More than 200,000 Soviet troops, hundreds of tanks and thousands of trucks and horse-drawn wagons filled the narrow dirt road between Krutoyarka and Fedorovka and were under constant German artillery fire and relentless air strikes from Ju 87s, Ju 88s and He 111s. SD-2 cluster munitions killed the unprotected infantry and SC250 bombs smashed up the Soviet vehicles and T-34 tanks. Destroyed vehicles and thousands of dead and dying Red Army soldiers choked up the road and the nearby ravines. Leonid Bobkin was killed by German machine gun fire and two more Soviet generals were killed in action on the 26th and 27th. Bock personally viewed the carnage from a hill near Lozovenka.

In the face of determined German operations, Timoshenko ordered the official halt of all Soviet offensive manoeuvres on 28 May, while attacks to break out of the encirclement continued until 30 May. Nonetheless, less than one man in ten managed to break out of the "Barvenkovo mousetrap". Hayward gives 75,000 Soviets killed and 239,000 taken prisoner. Beevor puts Soviet prisoners at 240,000 (with the bulk of their armour), while Glantz—citing Krivosheev—gives a total of 277,190 overall Soviet casualties. Both tend to agree on a low German casualty count, with the most formative estimate being at 20,000 dead, wounded and missing. Trigg called Timoshenko’s offensive ill-conceived as the Wehrmacht was preparing for Case Blue. Soviet forces were surrounded and forced back to the Donets; 239,000 men surrendered and 75,000 were killed although Soviet reports said casualties were only 171,000. Regardless of the casualties, Kharkov was a major Soviet setback; it put an end to the successes of the Red Army during the winter counteroffensive.

== Analysis and conclusions ==
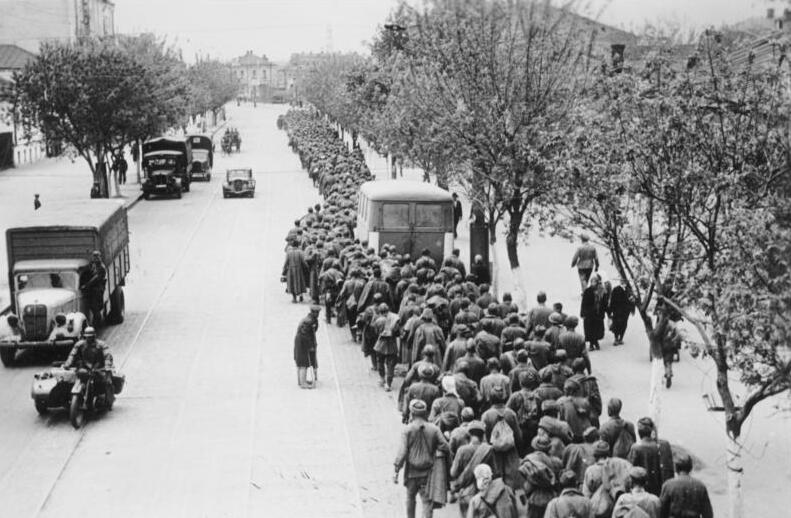
Soviet prisoners of war march through Kharkov in a largely unguarded column after the battle.

Many authors have attempted to pinpoint the reasons for the Soviet defeat. Several Soviet generals have placed the blame on the inability of Stavka and Stalin to appreciate the Wehrmacht's military power on the Eastern Front after their defeats in the winter of 1941–1942 and in the spring of 1942. On the subject, Zhukov sums up in his memoirs that the failure of this operation was quite predictable, since the offensive was organised very ineptly, the risk of exposing the left flank of the Izium salient to German counterattacks being obvious on a map. Still according to Zhukov, the main reason for the stinging Soviet defeat lay in the mistakes made by Stalin, who underestimated the danger coming from German armies in the southwestern sector (as opposed to the Moscow sector) and failed to take steps to concentrate any substantial strategic reserves there to meet any potential German threat. Furthermore, Stalin ignored sensible advice provided by his own General Chief of Staff, who recommended organising a strong defence in the southwestern sector in order to be able to repulse any Wehrmacht attack. In his famous address to the Twentieth Party Congress about the crimes of Stalin, Khrushchev used the Soviet leader's errors in this campaign as an example, saying: "Contrary to common sense, Stalin rejected our suggestion. He issued the order to continue the encirclement of Kharkov, despite the fact that at this time many [of our own] Army concentrations actually were threatened with encirclement and liquidation... And what was the result of this? The worst we had expected. The Germans surrounded our Army concentrations and as a result [the Kharkov counterattack] lost hundreds of thousands of our soldiers. This is Stalin's military 'genius'. This is what it cost us."

Additionally, the subordinate Soviet generals (especially South-Western Front generals) were just as willing to continue their own winter successes, and much like the German generals, underestimated the strength of their enemies, as pointed out a posteriori by Moskalenko, the commander of the 38th Army. The Soviet winter counteroffensive weakened the Wehrmacht, but did not destroy it. As Moskalenko recalls, quoting an anonymous soldier, "these fascists woke up after they hibernated".

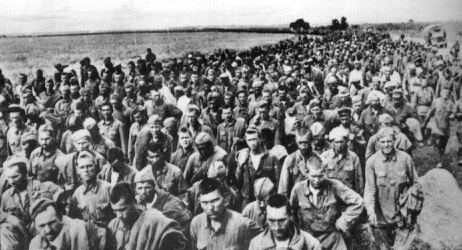
Soviet prisoners of war (David M. Glantz, Kharkov 1942)

Stalin's willingness to expend recently conscripted armies, which were poorly trained and poorly supplied, illustrated a misconception of realities, both in the capabilities of the Red Army and the subordinate arms of the armed forces, and in the abilities of the Germans to defend themselves and successfully launch a counteroffensive. The latter proved especially true in the subsequent Case Blue, which led to the Battle of Stalingrad, though this was the battle in which Paulus faced an entirely different outcome.

The battle had shown the potential of the Soviet armies to successfully conduct an offensive. This battle can be seen as one of the first major instances in which the Soviets attempted to preempt a German summer offensive. This later unfolded and grew as Stavka planned and conducted Operation Mars, Operation Uranus and Operation Saturn. Although only two of the three were victories, it still offers concise and telling evidence of the ability of the Soviets to turn the war in their favour. This finalised itself after the Battle of Kursk in July 1943. The Second Battle of Kharkov also had a positive effect on Stalin, who started to trust his commanders and his chief of staff more (allowing the latter to have the last word in naming front commanders for instance). After the great purge in 1937, failing to anticipate the war in 1941, and underestimating German military power in 1942, Stalin finally fully trusted his military.

Within the context of the battle itself, the failure of the Red Army to properly regroup during the prelude to the battle and the ability of the Germans to effectively collect intelligence on Soviet movements played an important role in the outcome. Poor Soviet performance in the north and equally poor intelligence-gathering at the hands of Stavka and front headquarters, also eventually spelled doom for the offensive. Nonetheless, despite this poor performance, it underscored a dedicated evolution of operations and tactics within the Red Army which borrowed and refined the pre-war theory, Soviet deep battle.

== See also ==
- First Battle of Kharkov
- Third Battle of Kharkov
- Belgorod–Kharkov offensive operation

== Sources ==
- Adam, Wilhelm; Ruhle, Otto (2015). With Paulus at Stalingrad. Translated by Tony Le Tissier. Pen and Sword Books Ltd. ISBN 978-1-4738-3386-9.
- Bergström, Christer (2007). Stalingrad – The Air Battle: 1942 through January 1943. Hinkley: Midland Publishing. ISBN 978-1-85780-276-4.
- Beevor, Antony (1998). Stalingrad: The Fateful Siege. New York: Viking. ISBN 0-670-87095-1.
- Erickson, John (1998). Barbarossa: The Axis and the Allies. Edinburgh University Press. ISBN 978-0-7486-0504-0.
- Forczyk, Robert (2013). Kharkov 1942: The Wehrmacht Strikes Back. Campaign. Vol. 254. Osprey. ISBN 978-1-78096-157-6.
- Glantz, David M. (1998). Kharkov 1942: Anatomy of a Military Disaster. New York: Sarpedon. ISBN 1-885119-54-2.
- Glantz, David M. (2002). The Battle for Leningrad, 1941–1944. Lawrence: University Press of Kansas. ISBN 978-0700612086.
- Glantz, David M.; House, Jonathan (1995). When Titans Clashed: How the Red Army Stopped Hitler. Lawrence: University Press of Kansas. ISBN 0-7006-0899-0.
- Hayward, Joel (1998). Stopped at Stalingrad: The Luftwaffe and Hitler's Defeat in the East, 1942–1943. Lawrence: University Press of Kansas. ISBN 978-0-7006-1146-1.
- Hayward, Joel S.A. (Summer 1997). "The German use of air power at Kharkov, May 1942". Air Power History. 2 (44).
- Moskalenko, K.S. (1969). На Юго-Западном направлении. Воспоминания командарма [On South-Western Direction] (in Russian). Moscow: Science. OCLC 907047498.
- Trigg, Jonathan (2016). The Defeat of the Luftwaffe: The Eastern Front 1941-45; A Strategy for Disaster. Amberley, Stroud England. ISBN 978-1-4456-5186-6.
- Vasilevsky, A.M. (1978). Дело всей жизни [The Matter of My Whole Life] (in Russian). Moscow: Politizdat. OCLC 6275232.
- Zhukov, G.K. (2002). Воспоминания и размышления [Memoirs and Reflections] (in Russian). Moscow: Olma-Press. ISBN 5-224-03195-8. Archived from the original on 2021-01-21.

49°59′33″N 36°13′52″E
