= Klaus Uebe =

Klaus-Siegfried Uebe
- Born: 15 January 1909
- Died: 3 February 1968 (aged 67)
- Military career
- Allegiance: Nazi Germany
- Branch: Luftwaffe
- Rank: Generalmajor
- Units: KG 2 Luftflotte 1
- Commands: 4th Air Division
- Conflicts: World War II
- Awards: Knight's Cross of the Iron Cross

Klaus Uebe (1 May 1900 – 3 February 1968) was a Luftwaffe general and recipient of the Knight's Cross of the Iron Cross of Nazi Germany.

== Awards ==
- German Cross in Gold on 29 December 1942 as Oberstleutnant im Generalstab with commanding general of the VIII. Flieger-Korps
- Knight's Cross of the Iron Cross on 9 June 1944 as Generalmajor and chief of the general staff of Luftflotte 1
