= Luftflotte 1 =

- Flag for the Chief of a Luftflotte
- Active: 1 February 1939
- Disbanded: 16 April 1945
- Country: Nazi Germany
- Branch: Luftwaffe
- Type: Command

Luftflotte 1 ("Air Fleet 1") was one of the primary divisions of the German Luftwaffe in World War II. It was formed on 1 February 1939 from Luftwaffengruppenkommando 1 in Berlin. This Luftwaffe detachment served in Estonia, Latvia, Lithuania and Finland, supporting Axis forces in area; with command offices in Malpils, Latvia, (26 June 1944), Eastern front.

== Units under command ==
=== Strategic reconnaissance ===
- Stab/FAGr 1 (Riga–Spilve)
- 3.(F)/22 (Riga–Spilve)
- 5.(F)/122 (Mitau)
- NASt 3 (Riga–Spilve)

=== Maritime reconnaissance ===
- 1./SAGr 127 (Reval–Ülemiste)

=== Transports ===
- 1./TGr 10(Ital.) (Riga–Spilve)

=== Transports (special works) ===
This unit was branch of Kampfgeschwader 200 (KG 200) with bases in East Prussia, Courland and the Baltic. It was equipped with:

- Junkers Ju 252
- Junkers Ju 352 Herkules
- Arado Ar 232 Tausendfüßler for transporting special commandos, weapons, vehicles or dropping secret agents in clandestine missions behind enemy lines.
- I.(TGr.)/KG 200 (based at Riga)

=== Bombers ===
- 14.(Eis)/KG 55 (Jakobstadt)

=== 3.Fliegerdivision (3rd air division) Petseri ===
==== Tactical Reconnaissance ====
- Nahaufklärungsgruppe 5
  - Stab//NAGr 5 (Petseri)
  - 1./NAGr 5 (Idriza)
- Nahaufklärungsgruppe 31
  - 1./NAGr 31 (Wesemberg)

==== Land Air Strike ====
- I/SG 3 (Jakobstadt)

==== Night ground attack ====
- Nachtschlachtgruppe 1
  - Stab/NSGr 1 (Idriza)
  - 3./NSGr 1 (Idriza)
  - 1./NSGr 1 (Kaunas)
  - 2./NSGr 1 (Kaunas)
- Nachtschlachtgruppe 1
  - Stab/NSGr 3 (Vecuci)
  - 1./NSGr 3 (Vecuci)
  - 2./NSGr 3 (Vecuci)
  - 1./NSGr 12 (Vecuci)
- Nachtschlachtgruppe 12
  - 1./(Detach)NSGr 12(Riga–Spilve)
- Nachtschlachtgruppe 11
  - Stab/NSGr 11 (Rahkla) (Note: Not to be confused with Rahkla, Rakvere Parish.)
  - 1./NSGr 11 (Rahkla)
  - 2./NSGr 11 (Rahkla)
  - 2./NSG 12 (Libau)

== Jagdabschnittführer Ostland ("fighter direction in Ostland") Riga-Spilve ==
JG 54 with fighters

- Stab/JG 54 (Dorpat)
- I./JG 54 (Turku) (Finland)
- 2./JG 54 (Reval–Laksberg)
- 3./JG 54 (Reval–Laksberg)

Gefechtsverband Kuhlmey (Kuhlmey combat unit) Immola

Tactical reconnaissance

- 1./NAGr 5 (Immola)

Fighters

- II./JG 54 (Immola)

Ground attack

- Schlachtgeschwader 3 based at Immola
  - Stab/SG 3
  - 1./SG 3
  - 2./SG 3
  - 3./SG 3

== Commanding officers ==
- Generalfeldmarschall Albert Kesselring, 1 February 1939 – 11 January 1940
- Generaloberst Hans-Jürgen Stumpff, 12 January 1940 – 10 May 1940
- General Wilhelm Wimmer, 11 May 1940 – 19 August 1940
- Generaloberst Alfred Keller, 20 August 1940 – 12 June 1943
- Generaloberst Günther Korten, 12 June 1943 – 23 August 1943
- General Kurt Pflugbeil, 24 August 1943 – 16 April 1945

== Chiefs of staff ==
- Generalmajor Wilhelm Speidel, 1 February 1939 – 19 December 1939
- Generalleutnant Ulrich Kessler, 19 December 1939 – 25 April 1940
- Oberst Heinz-Hellmuth von Wühlisch, 1 May 1940 – 9 May 1940
- Generalmajor Dr. Robert Knauss, 9 May 1940 – 4 October 1940
- Generalmajor Otto Schöbel, 5 October 1940 – 16 January 1941
- Generalmajor Heinz-Hellmuth von Wühlisch, 16 January 1941 – 13 October 1941
- Generalmajor Herbert Rieckhoff, 13 October 1941 – 23 February 1943
- Generalmajor Hans Detlef Herhudt von Rohden, 23 February 1943 – 24 August 1943
- Generalmajor Klaus Uebe, 25 August 1943 – 24 December 1944
- Oberstleutnant Paul-Werner Hozzel, 25 December 1944 – 16 April 1945

== Subordinate units ==
- II, III/Kampfgeschwader 1 "Hindenburg" (Ju 88A)
- Kampfgeschwader 76 (Ju 88A)
- Kampfgeschwader 77 (Ju 88A)
- K.Fl.Gr. 806 (Ju 88A)
- Jagdgeschwader 54 (Bf 109F)
- 2(F) Ob.d.L. (Do 215B)
- 5(F) 122 (Ju 88D)
- eleven squadrons of (Hs 126)
- SAGr 125 (Ar 95, Ar 196, He 114)
- one transport squadron (Ju 52)
- five liaison squadrons (Fi 156)
- IV Flak Corps
  - 2nd Flak Division
  - 6th Flak Division

== Abbreviations ==
- FAGr = Fernaufklärungsgruppe = Reconnaissance aircraft.
  - Gruppe = equivalent to an RAF Wing.
- JG = Jagdgeschwader = Fighters.
  - Geschwader = equivalent to a Royal Air Force Group.
- KG = Kampfgeschwader = Bombers.
- KG zbV = Kampfgeschwader zur besonderen Verwendung = Transport aircraft, later TG.
- NAGr = Nahaufklärungsgruppe = Observation aircraft.
- NASt = Nahaufklärungsstaffel = Observation aircraft.
  - Staffel = equivalent to an RAF Squadron.
- NSGr = Nachtschlachtgruppe = Night ground attack.
- SAGr = Seeaufklärungsgruppe = Maritime patrol aircraft
- SG = Schlachtgeschwader = Ground attack.
- TG = Transportgeschwader= Transport aircraft.

== See also ==
- Organization of the Luftwaffe (1933–1945)
