= Alfred Keller =

German general (1882–1974)

- Keller as NSFK Korpsführer
- Born: 19 September 1882; Bochum, German Empire
- Died: 11 February 1974 (aged 91); West Berlin, West Germany
- Burial place: Waldfriedhof Zehlendorf
- Military career
- Allegiance: German Empire; Weimar Republic; Nazi Germany
- Branch: Luftwaffe
- Service years: 1902–1945
- Rank: Generaloberst
- Commands: Luftflotte 1
- Conflicts: World War I World War II
- Awards: Pour le Mérite; Knight's Cross of the Iron Cross

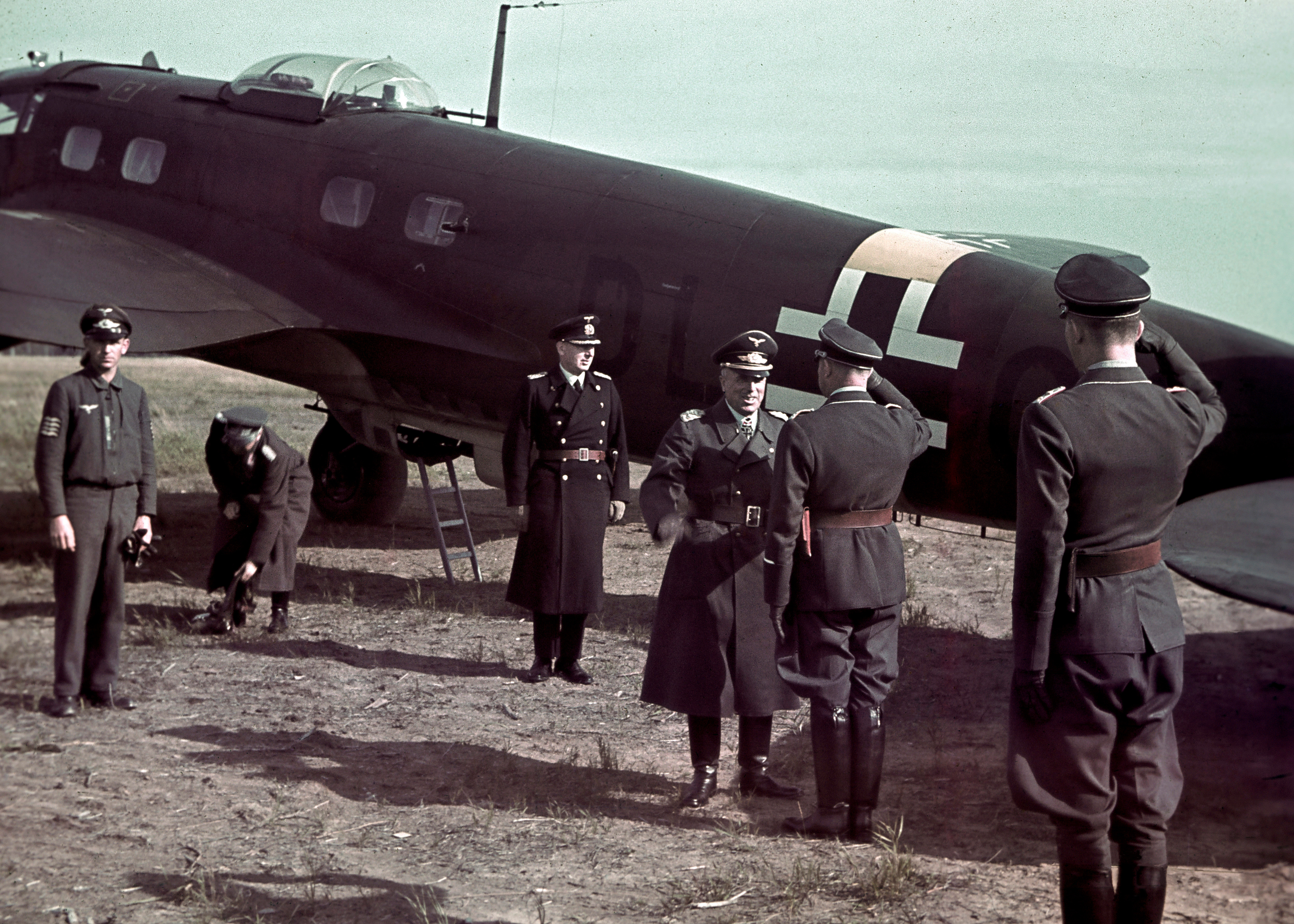
Keller arrives at Mensuvaara, Finland, 13 August 1942

Alfred Keller (19 September 1882 – 11 February 1974) was a general in the German Luftwaffe during the Second World War. Born in Bochum, Province of Westphalia, his career in the Imperial German Armed Forces began in 1897, when he became a cadet in a military school, he retired after the Second World War as one of the most decorated Generals of the former Luftwaffe.

== Biography ==
After his graduation, in 1902, Keller served in the 17º Battalion Infantry in Thorn as Fähnrich. While serving in Thorn, Keller became attracted to heavier-than-air aircraft, and made his first flight in the school at Metz, becoming an observer in 1912. In the following year, Keller concluded his training as a pilot in the school of Niederneuendorf, gaining his pilot’s wings.

When the First World War begun in August 1914, Hauptmann Alfred Keller was serving in a Western Front bomber unit Kagohl 5, Kampfstaffel (Kasta) 27, with which he would fly his first combat missions. Keller participated in the first air reconnaissance mission of Paris in October 1914, which served to obtain evidence in the absence of anti-aircraft defences in the French capital. This factor was decisive for Keller and the unit’s pilots to initiate attacks on the French cities, one of which, against Paris, gaining for him the Cross of Iron 2nd Class. On the Verdun and Somme fronts Keller performed some missions of reconnaissance and offensive patrolling, which led to him in September 1915 being nominated Kommandeur of Kagohl 7, Kampfstaffel (Kasta) 40, a unit that he would help to consolidate in the following months. On 1 September 1917, after some attacks of its airplanes against the enemy lines, Keller s decorated with Cross of Iron 1st Class, also in recognition for his performance as an organiser.

Assuming the command of Bombengeschwader der Obersten Heeresleitung (Bogohl; Bomben Geschwader der OHL - Bomber wing of the OHL) BG 1 (new designation for bomber squadrons) from April 1917 until the end of the war, Keller’s unit become the first German bombers to operate night missions, which was noted for the missions against Dunkirk and the British forces concentrated there, with his sudden delivery in the silence of the night of 100,000 kg of bombs on the port, causing considerable damage in September 1917 and forced a British retreat to Calais. For planning, organization and leadership in this attack and others he was decorated with the Cross of the House Order of Hohenzollern with Swords, and on the on 4 December 1917, with the even more desirable Order Pour le Mérite. On the night of 30–31 January 1918 Keller, in spite of the fierce anti-aircraft opposition, again attacked Paris, causing a great panic in the civilian population, the pilots of Bogohl 1 returned safely though. These multiple attacks by Keller on Paris would compel the French to remove some anti-aircraft batteries from the front and use them in the defence of the city. Promotions:

- Fähnrich: 22 November 1902
- Leutnant: 18 August 1903 (Patent 19 August 1902)
- Oberleutnant: 18 August 1911
- Hauptmann: 8 November 1914
- Charakter als Major: 16 January 1920

Assignments:

- 5 April 1902 – 19 February 1912: Fahnenjunker and company officer in Pionier-Bataillon Nr. 17, Thorn.
- 1912 – 1914: I. Transferred to the Engineer Inspectorate and admitted to Fortifications in Wilhelmshaven.
- 1912 – 1913: At the same time, underwent aerial observer training.
- 1913 – 1 August 1914: Pilot training and pilot at Flying Station Darmstadt.
- 2 August 1914 – 1915: Commander of Feldflieger-Abteilung [Field Aviation Detachment] 27.
- 1915 – 1916: Commander of Armeeflugpark [Army Air Park] 5.
- 1916: Commander of Armeeflugpark 1.
- 1916 – 31 March 1917: Commander of Feldflieger-Abteilung 40.
- 1 April 1917 – 1 December 1918: Commander of Bombengeschwader [Bomber Wing] of the Army High Command
- 1 December 1918 – 16 January 1920: On leave.

The end of First World War found Keller in command of the Luftreederei, a logistics unit. In the years following the Armistice, Keller left the army and became first director/conductor of the "Abteilung Luftverkehr der Junkerswerke" (later part of Deutsche Luft Hansa) ground-air service of the German air shipping company, the first German airline founded by Hugo Junkers. In 1923 he changed direction of his business by offering air shipping company services and was a managing director in Danzig, offering air mail service in Germany for the first time. During 1925 Keller operated an air traffic control school in Berlin, but in 1928 moved it to Braunschweig. Here he began, as a means of resistance to Allied conditions of Armistice the secret training of new military pilots, and he would be one of the first men called by Hermann Göring to help in the reconstruction of the Luftwaffe, as soon as the Nazis had assumed power in 1933. With the organisation of the Luftwaffe, Keller was commissioned with the rank of Oberst (Colonel), and assumed the command of the first bomber squadron, during the winter of 1936, KG 154 “Boelke” (He 111B-1). Soon after he was appointed commander of the Air Force command East Prussia.

In September 1939, when the Second World War begun, the then General Alfred Keller commanded the IV. Fliegerkorps during Campaign in Poland, assuming this command on 13 October 1939. The following campaigns, during campaigns against Norway, Holland, Belgium and the Battle of France, he commanded Luftflotte 2 with General der Flieger Albert Kesselring as his superior. By his superlative performance during these campaigns, Alfred Keller was decorated by Hitler with the Knight's Cross of the Iron Cross on 24 June 1940 as General Kommandierender of the IV Fliergerkorps. Shortly afterwards, on 19 July 1940, he was promoted Generaloberst. On 19 August 1940, during the Battle of Britain, Alfred Keller was appointed as the commander of Luftflotte 1 and Air Force commander - East. Keller led this formation very energetically during the invasion of the Balkans Campaign and later during the Operation Barbarossa where he predominantly supported Army Group North. Keller remained with Luftflotte 1 until 12 June 1943, when he retired from active service at the age of 61, replaced by the 16 years younger Günther Korten. However he continued to perform important functions in the NSFK (Nationalsozialistische Fliegerkorps – Organisation of Aerial National Socialist, a paramilitary unit that he organised to form a civil reserve of pilots). He was Korpsführer of the NSFK from June 26, 1943, until the German surrender on May 8, 1945. Towards the end of the war Keller was the responsible one for the antitank weapons department of the Luftwaffe. Promotions:

- Oberst: 1 January 1934
- Generalmajor: 1 April 1936
- Generalleutnant: 1 February 1938
- General der Flieger: 1 April 1939
- Generaloberst: 19 July 1940

With the German capitulation on 8 May 1945, Keller became a British prisoner, being kept as a POW until 1947. In the 1950s he become one of the first presidents of the Ordensgemeinschaft der Ritterkreuzträger (Association of Knight's Cross Recipients). Keller died in Berlin.

- Iron Cross (1914) II. and I. Class
- House Order of Hohenzollern, Knight Cross with Swords
- Royal Prussian pilot badge
- Bavarian Military Merit Order IV. Class with swords and crown
- Pour le Mérite 4 December 1917
- Hessian Bravery medal
- Honour Cross for Combatants
- Honourable Armed Forces Service IV. to II. Class
- Clasp to the Iron Cross II. and I. Class (see Front Flying Clasp of the Luftwaffe)
- Knight's Cross of the Iron Cross on 24 June 1940 as General der Flieger and commanding general of the IV. Fliegerkorps
- Combined Pilots-Observation Badge in Gold with Diamonds.

The Keller family is still around today.

== Awards ==
- Iron Cross (1914), II. and I. Class
- House Order of Hohenzollern, Knights' Cross with Swords
- Bavarian Military Merit Order, 4th Class with swords and crown
- General Honour Decoration for Bravery (Hesse)
- Pilot’s Badge German Empire
- Pour le Mérite (4 December 1917)
- Honour Cross of the World War 1914/1918
- Wehrmacht Long Service Award 4th to 2nd Class
- Combined Pilots-Observation Badge in Gold with Diamonds
- Clasp to the Iron Cross II. and I. Class
- Front Flying Clasp of the Luftwaffe
- Knight's Cross of the Iron Cross on 24 June 1940 as General der Flieger and commanding general of the IV. Fliegerkorps
- Grand Cross with Swords of the Order of the White Rose of Finland (30 April 1942)

Military offices
| Preceded by Generalmajor Hellmuth Bieneck | Commander of 4. Flieger-Division; 1 February 1939 – 11 October 1939 | Succeeded by IV. Fliegerkorps |
| Preceded by: 4. Flieger-Division | Commander of IV. Fliegerkorps; 11 October 1939 – 19 August 1940 | Succeeded by General der Flieger Kurt Pflugbeil |
| Preceded by General Wilhelm Wimmer | Commander of Luftflotte 1; 20 August 1940 – 12 June 1943 | Succeeded by Generaloberst Günther Korten |
