= Soviet destroyer Bditelny (1937) =

Destroyer of the Soviet Navy

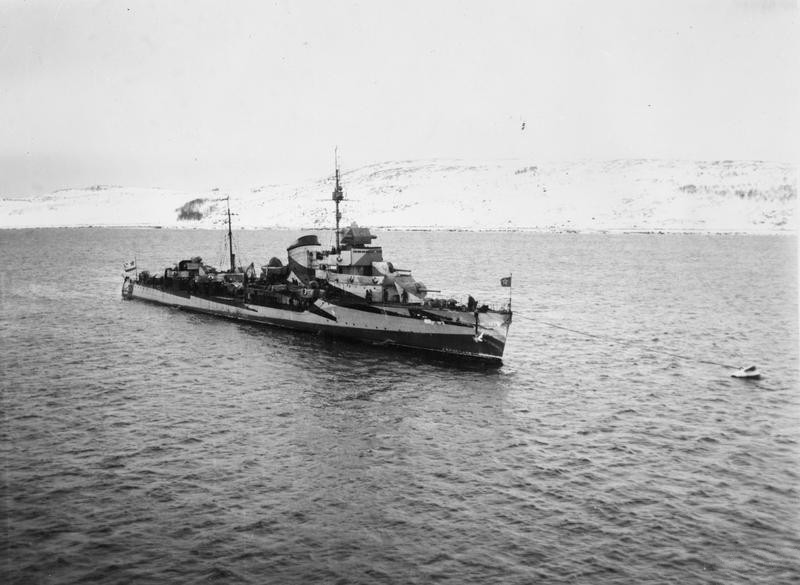
- Aerial view of sister ship Razumny, March 1944

History

Soviet Union
- Name: Bditelny
- Ordered: 2nd Five-Year Plan
- Builder: Shipyard No. 200 (named after 61 Communards), Nikolayev
- Laid down: 23 August 1936
- Launched: 29 June 1937
- Completed: 2 October 1939
- Commissioned: 22 October 1939
- Fate: Sunk by aircraft, 2 July 1942

General characteristics (Gnevny as completed, 1938)
- Class & type: Gnevny-class destroyer
- Displacement: 1,612 t (1,587 long tons) (standard)
- Length: 112.8 m (370 ft 1 in) (o/a)
- Beam: 10.2 m (33 ft 6 in)
- Draft: 4.8 m (15 ft 9 in)
- Installed power: 3 water-tube boilers; 48,000 shp (36,000 kW)
- Propulsion: 2 shafts; 2 geared steam turbines
- Speed: 38 knots (70 km/h; 44 mph)
- Range: 2,720 nmi (5,040 km; 3,130 mi) at 19 knots (35 km/h; 22 mph)
- Complement: 197 (236 wartime)
- Sensors & processing systems: Mars hydrophone
- Armament: 4 × single 130 mm (5.1 in) guns; 2 × single 76.2 mm (3 in) AA guns; 2 × single 45 mm (1.8 in) AA guns; 2 × single 12.7 mm (0.50 in) AA machineguns; 2 × triple 533 mm (21 in) torpedo tubes; 60–96 mines; 2 × depth charge racks, 25 depth charges

Bditelny was one of 29 Gnevny-class destroyers (officially known as Project 7) built for the Soviet Navy during the late 1930s. Completed in 1939, she was assigned to the Black Sea Fleet. After the German invasion of the Soviet Union began in 1941, the ship provided naval gunfire support during the Siege of Odessa. Frequently under repair due to running aground in 1941, Bditelny was unable to support the defenders of Sevastopol until early 1942 when she began to ferry supplies and troops there while also bombarding German positions outside the besieged city. She was sunk during a German airstrike in July when some of her torpedoes exploded. Her wreck was salvaged for scrap between 1948 and 1952.

== Design and description ==
Having decided to build the large and expensive 40-knot (74 km/h; 46 mph) Leningrad-class destroyer leaders, the Soviet Navy sought Italian assistance in designing smaller and cheaper destroyers. They licensed the plans for the Folgore class and, in modifying it for their purposes, overloaded a design that was already somewhat marginally stable.

The Gnevnys had an overall length of 112.8 meters (370 ft 1 in), a beam of 10.2 meters (33 ft 6 in), and a draft of 4.8 meters (15 ft 9 in) at deep load. The ships were significantly overweight, almost 200 metric tons (197 long tons) heavier than designed, displacing 1,612 metric tons (1,587 long tons) at standard load and 2,039 metric tons (2,007 long tons) at deep load. Their crew numbered 197 officers and sailors in peacetime and 236 in wartime. The ships had a pair of geared steam turbines, each driving one propeller, rated to produce 48,000 shaft horsepower (36,000 kW) using steam from three water-tube boilers which was intended to give them a maximum speed of 37 knots (69 km/h; 43 mph). The designers had been conservative in rating the turbines and many, but not all, of the ships handily exceeded their designed speed during their sea trials. Others fell considerably short of it, although specific figures for most individual ships have not survived. Variations in fuel oil capacity meant that the range of the Gnevnys varied between 1,670 to 3,145 nautical miles (3,093 to 5,825 km; 1,922 to 3,619 mi) at 19 knots (35 km/h; 22 mph).

As built, the Gnevny-class ships mounted four 130-millimeter (5.1 in) B-13 guns in two pairs of superfiring single mounts fore and aft of the superstructure. Anti-aircraft defense was provided by a pair of 76.2-millimeter (3 in) 34-K AA guns in single mounts and a pair of 45-millimeter (1.8 in) 21-K AA guns as well as two 12.7-millimeter (0.50 in) DK or DShK machine guns. They carried six 533 mm (21.0 in) torpedo tubes in two rotating triple mounts; each tube was provided with a reload. The ships could also carry a maximum of either 60 or 95 mines and 25 depth charges. They were fitted with a set of Mars hydrophones for anti-submarine work, although they were useless at speeds over 3 knots (5.6 km/h; 3.5 mph). The ships were equipped with two K-1 paravanes intended to destroy mines and a pair of depth-charge throwers.

== Construction and service ==
Built in Nikolayev's Shipyard No. 200 (named after 61 Communards) as yard number 1070, Bditelny was laid down on 23 August 1936, launched on 29 June 1937. The ship was completed on 2 October 1939 and was commissioned into the Black Sea Fleet on 22 October.

When the Germans invaded the Soviet Union on 22 June 1941, Bditelny was assigned to the 2nd Destroyer Division and was refitting in Nikolayev. The refit was completed by 10 July when the ship steamed for Sevastopol, but she had to return for repairs. The same thing happened eight days later. While covering the transfer of incomplete ships from Nikolayev to Sevastopol on 13 August, Bditelny was damaged when she accidentally collided with the freighter SS Kaments-Podolsk. After repairs were completed, the ship provided gunfire support for the defenders of Odessa on 26–27 August. On 24 September, she ran aground, damaging her bow, and repairs were completed the following month. Bditelny helped to evacuate cut-off Soviet troops from pockets along the Black Sea coast to Sevastopol in early November. On 9 November, she ran aground off the Tuzla Spit, damaging her propellers and flooding her middle boiler room. The ship was pulled off and was under repair at Tuapse until mid-February 1942.

On 26 February, Bditelny, together with her sister Boyky and the leader Kharkov, bombarded German positions at Feodosia, expending 60 rounds from her main guns. The ship conducted further gunfire support missions in the area on 28 February and 3, 11 and 14 March. The following month, she began transporting supplies and troops to and from besieged Sevastopol and providing gunfire support. Between 16 April and 13 June, Bditelny fired 535 shells from her main guns. On 17 April, the ship rescued 143 survivors from the sunken transport SS Svaneti and she was briefly refitted the following month. After the destroyer leader Tashkent was crippled by German aircraft on 26 June, Bditelny was one of the ships sent to assist her and towed Tashkent to Novorossiysk for repairs. During an air raid on Novorossiysk by I. Gruppe (First Group) of Kampfgeschwader 76 (Bomber Wing 76) on 2 July, bomb splinters caused torpedoes in her forward mount to detonate, which set off her aft magazines, sinking the ship. Her wreck was salvaged in pieces and scrapped in 1948–1952.

== Sources ==
- Balakin, Sergey (2007). Легендарные "семёрки" Эсминцы "сталинской" серии [Legendary Sevens: Stalin's destroyer series] (in Russian). Moscow: Yauza/Eksmo. ISBN 978-5-699-23784-5.
- Berezhnoy, Sergey (2002). Крейсера и миноносцы. Справочник [Guide to Cruisers and Destroyers] (in Russian). Moscow: Voenizdat. ISBN 5-203-01780-8.
- Budzbon, Przemysaw (1980). "Soviet Union". In Chesneau, Roger (ed.). Conway's All the World's Fighting Ships 1922–1946. Greenwich, UK: Conway Maritime Press. pp. 318–346. ISBN 0-85177-146-7.
- Hill, Alexander (2018). Soviet Destroyers of World War II. New Vanguard. Vol. 256. Oxford, UK: Osprey Publishing. ISBN 978-1-4728-2256-7.
- Platonov, Andrej V. (2002). Энциклопедия советских надводных кораблей 1941–1945 [Encyclopedia of Soviet Surface Ships 1941–1945] (in Russian). Saint Petersburg: Poligon. ISBN 5-89173-178-9.
- Rohwer, Jürgen (2005). Chronology of the War at Sea 1939–1945: The Naval History of World War Two (Third Revised ed.). Annapolis, Maryland: Naval Institute Press. ISBN 1-59114-119-2.
- Rohwer, Jürgen & Monakov, Mikhail S. (2001). Stalin's Ocean-Going Fleet. London: Frank Cass. ISBN 0-7146-4895-7.
- Yakubov, Vladimir & Worth, Richard (2008). "The Soviet Project 7/7U Destroyers". In Jordan, John & Dent, Stephen (eds.). Warship 2008. London: Conway. pp. 99–114. ISBN 978-1-84486-062-3.
