= 4th Air Division (Germany) =

4. Flieger Division
- Air Division commander's pennant
- Country: Nazi Germany
- Branch: Luftwaffe
- Role: Air Operations
- Size: Division

4. Flieger Division (4th Air Division) was one of the primary divisions of the German Luftwaffe in World War II. It was formed on 1 August 1938 in Munich from the Höheren Fliegerkommandeur 5. The Division was redesignated 21. Flieger-Division on 1 November 1938 and relocated to Braunschweig and again renamed to 4. Flieger Division on 1 February 1939. The unit was relocated to Düsseldorf on 1 October 1939 and redesignated IV. Fliegerkorps on 11 October 1939 and reformed again in June 1943 in Smolensk.

== Commanders ==
- Generalmajor Hellmuth Bieneck, 1 August 1938 – 31 January 1939
- General der Flieger Alfred Keller, 1 February 1939 – 11 October 1939
- Generalmajor Josef Punzert, June 1943 – 30 June 1943
- Generalleutnant Hermann Plocher, 1 July 1943 – 25 August 1943
- Oberst Franz Reuß, 25 August 1943 – 5 April 1945
- Generalmajor Klaus Uebe (acting), 25 December 1944 – 24 January 1945
