= Günther Korten =

German Colonel General (1898–1944)

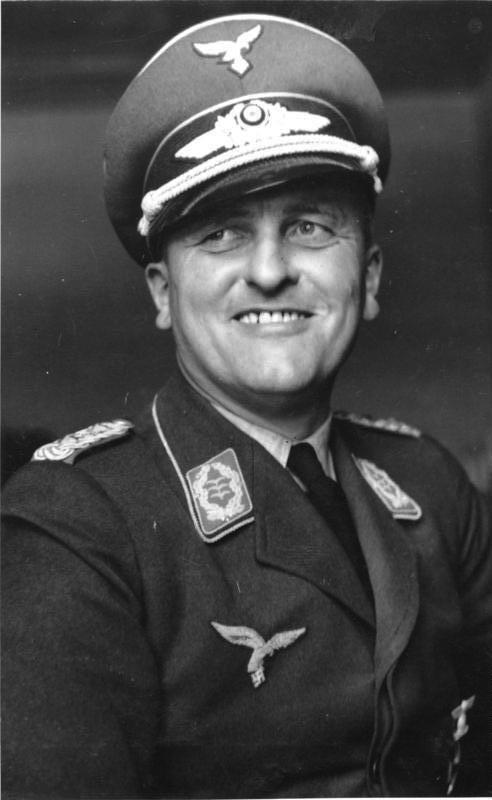
- Born: 26 July 1898; Cologne, German Empire
- Died: 22 July 1944 (aged 45); Carlshof, Rastenburg, East Prussia, Nazi Germany
- Military career
- Allegiance: German Empire; Weimar Republic; Nazi Germany
- Branch: Luftwaffe
- Service years: 1914–1944
- Rank: Generaloberst (posthumously)
- Commands: Chief of the Luftwaffe General Staff
- Conflicts: World War I World War II
- Awards: Knight's Cross of the Iron Cross

Günther Korten (26 July 1898 – 22 July 1944) was a German Colonel General and Chief of the General Staff of the Luftwaffe in World War II. He died from injuries suffered in the assassination attempt on Adolf Hitler on 20 July 1944.

== Biography ==
=== Early life ===
Korten was born in Cologne as a son of the architect Hugo Korten (1855–1931) and his wife Marie Korten (1866–1942). At the beginning of World War I he was a cadet in the Prussian army. He served through the war in an engineering battalion. He continued his military career after the war in the Engineers, until he was selected in 1928 to participate in the secret pilot training programme in the Soviet Union. On returning to Weimar Germany he joined the "Bildstelle Berlin".

=== World War II ===
Korten, by then a captain, joined the Luftwaffe in 1934 as Nazi Germany started on its rearmament programme. He received training as a general staff officer and served for several years in the Air Ministry. He was a colonel and chief of the general staff of Luftflotte 4 (4th Air Fleet) stationed in Austria.

At the beginning of 1940, Korten was transferred to the general staff of the Luftflotte 3 (3rd Air Fleet), in which he served during the Battle of France and in the Battle of Britain. On 19 July he was promoted to major-general. In January 1941 he transferred back to the 4th Air Fleet, in order to participate in the Balkans Campaign and in the assault on the Soviet Union (Operation Barbarossa). In August 1942 he was promoted to lieutenant-general and took over the command over the I. Fliegerkorps, which fought at the southern sector of the Eastern Front and was temporarily transferred to the "Luftwaffenkommando Don" during the Battle of Stalingrad.

At the beginning of 1943 Korten was promoted to general and in the summer replaced Alfred Keller at Luftflotte 1 (1st Air Fleet). A few weeks later, on 25 August he accepted the position of chief of the general staff of the Luftwaffe, after the former chief of the general staff Hans Jeschonnek committed suicide.

=== Death ===
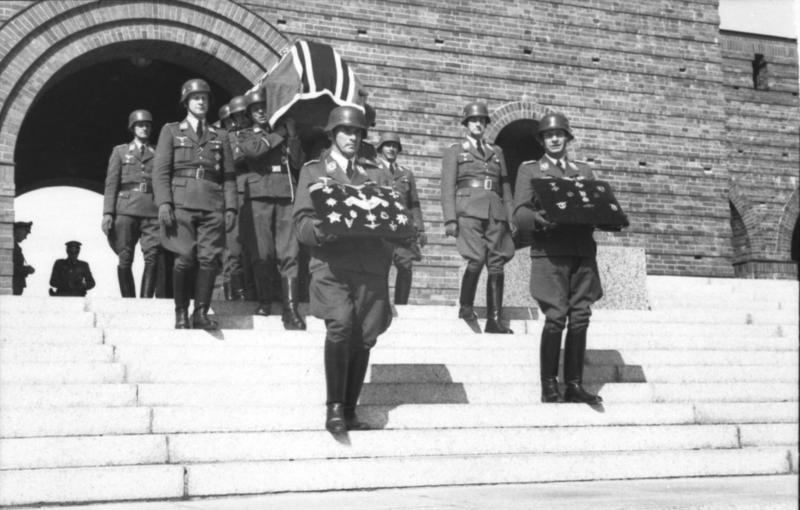
Funeral ceremony at Tannenberg

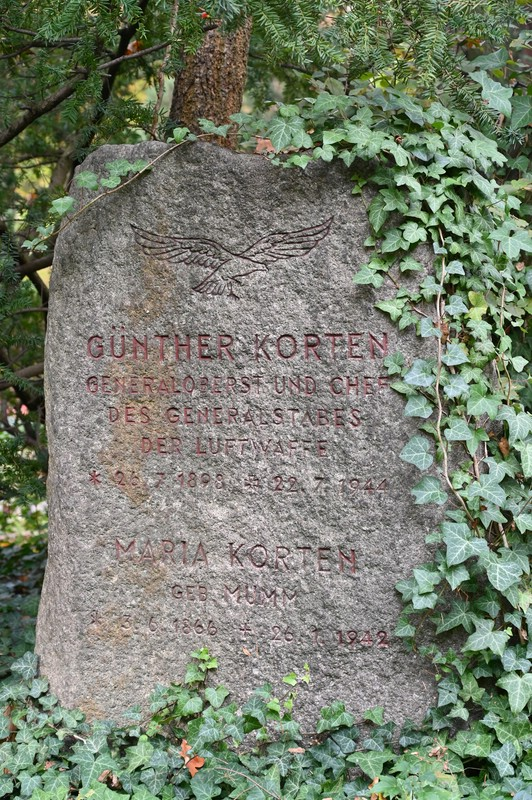
grave in Steglitz

Korten was seriously wounded in the Wolfsschanze near Rastenburg during the 20 July Plot in 1944, in which Colonel Claus von Stauffenberg attempted to assassinate Hitler with a bomb. Two days after the assassination attempt he succumbed to his injuries in the military hospital attached to the Führer's headquarters. Like the other military victims Rudolf Schmundt and Heinz Brandt he was posthumously promoted, in his case to colonel-general.

Originally, Korten was buried in the Tannenberg Memorial. The memorial complex was demolished following the war, and he was reburied in the Friedhof Bergstraße cemetery in Steglitz, Berlin. The grave still exists.

== Awards ==
- Iron Cross (1914), 2nd and 1st Class
- Clasp to the Iron Cross (1939), 2nd and 1st Class
- Honour Cross of the World War 1914/1918
- Pilot/Observer Badge In Gold with Diamonds
- German Cross in Gold (29 December 1942)
- Knight's Cross of the Iron Cross on 3 May 1941 as Generalmajor and Chief of the General Staff of Luftflotte 4
- Wound Badge of 20 July (posthumously)

Military offices
Preceded by none	Commander of Luftwaffenkommando Don; 26 August 1942 – 17 February 1943	Succeeded by none
Preceded by Generaloberst Alfred Keller	Commander of Luftflotte 1; 12 June 1943 – 23 August 1943	Succeeded by General Kurt Pflugbeil
Preceded by Generaloberst Hans Jeschonnek	Chief of the Luftwaffe General Staff; 4 September 1943 – 22 July 1944	Succeeded by General der Flieger Werner Kreipe
