= Hermann Plocher =

German general (1901–1980)

- Born: 5 January 1901
- Died: 8 December 1980 (aged 79)
- Military career
- Allegiance: Nazi Germany; West Germany
- Branch: Luftwaffe; German Air Force
- Rank: Generalleutnant; Generalmajor (Bundeswehr)
- Conflicts: World War II
- Awards: Knight's Cross of the Iron Cross with Oak Leaves

Hermann Lukas Plocher (5 January 1901 – 8 December 1980) was a German general during World War II. He was a recipient of the Knight's Cross of the Iron Cross with Oak Leaves of Nazi Germany.

== Awards ==
- Iron Cross (1939) 2nd Class (17 May 1940) & 1st Class (5 June 1940)
- German Cross in Gold on 9 April 1942 as Oberst im Generalstab (in the General Staff) in the V. Fliegerkorps
- Knight's Cross of the Iron Cross with Oak Leaves
  - Knight's Cross on 22 November 1943 as Generalmajor and commander of the 4. Flieger-Division
  - 867th Oak Leaves on 8 May 1945 as Generalleutnant and commander of the 6. Fallschirmjäger-Division (Note: Hermann Plocher's nomination had been finalized by the Heerespersonalamt (HPA—Army Staff Office) and was ready for signature by the end of the war. According to the Association of Knight's Cross Recipients (AKCR) the award was present in accordance with the Dönitz-decree. This is illegal according to the Deutsche Dienststelle (WASt) and lacks legal justification. The presentation date was assigned by Fellgiebel. Plocher was a member of the AKCR.)

== Notes ==
Military offices
Preceded by General Alfred Schlemm	Commander of 1. Flieger-Division; 1 October 1942 – 31 October 1942	Succeeded by General Alfred Bülowius
Preceded by Generalmajor Josef Punzert	Commander of 4. Flieger-Division; 1 July 1943 – 25 August 1943	Succeeded by Oberst Franz Reuß
Preceded by Oberstleutnant Harry Herrmann	Commander of 6. Fallschirmjäger-Division; 1 October 1944 – 8 May 1945	Succeeded by disbanded
Preceded by —	Commander of 2. Luftverteidigungsdivision(Bundeswehr); 1958 – December 1960	Succeeded by Brigadegeneral Werner Eugen Hoffmann
