= Kresty =

Kresty may refer to:

- Kresty, Krasnogorodsky District, Pskov Oblast, a village in Krasnogorodsky District of Pskov Oblast, Russia
- Kresty, Botalovskaya Volost, Kunyinsky District, Pskov Oblast, a village in Botalovskaya Volost of Kunyinsky District of Pskov Oblast, Russia
- Kresty, Dolgovitskaya Volost, Kunyinsky District, Pskov Oblast, a village in Dolgovitskaya Volost of Kunyinsky District of Pskov Oblast, Russia
- Kresty, Nevelsky District, Pskov Oblast, a village in Nevelsky District of Pskov Oblast, Russia
- Kresty, Vologda Oblast, a village in Vologda Oblast, Russia
- Kresty, name of several other rural localities in Russia

== See also ==
- Kresty Prison, an infamous prison in Saint Petersburg, Russia
