= Kresty, Vologda Oblast =

Kresty Кресты
- Village
- Location within Vologda Oblast Location within Russia
- Coordinates: 58°43′N 36°41′E
- Country: Russia
- Region: Vologda Oblast
- District: Ustyuzhensky District
- Time zone: UTC+3:00

Kresty (Russian: Кресты) is a rural locality (a village) in Soshnevskoye Rural Settlement, Ustyuzhensky District, Vologda Oblast, Russia. The population was 4 as of 2002.

== Geography ==
Kresty is located 34 km (21 mi) southeast of Ustyuzhna (the district's administrative centre) by road.
