= Kurt Pflugbeil =

German WW2 Luftwaffe general (1890-1955)

- Born: 9 May 1890; Königstein, Saxony, German Empire
- Died: 31 May 1955 (aged 65); Göttingen, West Germany
- Relatives: Johann Pflugbeil (brother)
- Military career
- Allegiance: Nazi Germany
- Branch: Luftwaffe
- Rank: General der Flieger
- Commands: 4th Air Corps; Luftflotte 1
- Conflicts: World War II
- Awards: Knight's Cross of the Iron Cross with Oak Leaves

Kurt Leopold Pflugbeil (9 May 1890 – 31 May 1955) was a German general (General der Flieger) in the Luftwaffe during World War II who commanded 4th Air Corps and Luftflotte 1. He was a recipient of the Knight's Cross of the Iron Cross with Oak Leaves of Nazi Germany.

Pflugbeil commanded the 4th Air Corps during the Second Battle of Kharkov, Battle of Stalingrad and Siege of Sevastopol. He surrendered to the Red Army in the Courland Pocket in 1945. In 1950 he was sentenced to 25 years in a labour camp. Pflugbeil was released in 1954.

== Awards and decorations ==
- Iron Cross (1914) 2nd Class (14 September 1914) & 1st Class (7 October 1916)
- Clasp to the Iron Cross (1939) 2nd Class (7 October 1939) & 1st Class (15 June 1940)
- Knight's Cross of the Iron Cross with Oak Leaves
  - Knight's Cross on 5 October 1941 as Generalleutnant and commander of IV. Fliegerkorps
  - 562nd Oak Leaves on 27 August 1944 as General der Flieger and commander of Luftflotte 1

Military offices
Preceded by Generaloberst Alfred Keller	Commander of IV. Fliegerkorps; 20 August 1940 – 24 August 1943	Succeeded by General der Flieger Rudolf Meister
Preceded by Generaloberst Günther Korten	Commander of Luftflotte 1; 24 August 1943 – 16 April 1945	Succeeded by None
