= 4th Air Corps =

IV. Fliegerkorps German 4th Air Corps
- Flag of a commanding general of a Fliegerkorps
- Active: 11 October 1939 – 16 September 1944
- Country: Nazi Germany
- Branch: Luftwaffe

Commanders
- Notable commanders: Alfred Keller

IV. Fliegerkorps (Note: For more details see Luftwaffe Organization) (4th Air Corps) was formed 11 October 1939 in Düsseldorf from the 4. Flieger-Division. The Corps was disbanded on 16 September 1944 and its Stab formed the Kommandierenden General der Deutschen Luftwaffe in Dänemark (commanding general of the German Luftwaffe in Denmark).

== Commanding officers ==
- Generaloberst Alfred Keller, 11 October 1939 – 19 August 1940
- General der Flieger Kurt Pflugbeil, 20 August 1940 – 24 August 1943
- General der Flieger Rudolf Meister, 4 September 1943 – 16 September 1944

=== Chiefs of staff ===
- Oberst Alexander Holle, 11 October 1939 – 19 December 1939
- Oberst Josef Kammhuber, 19 December 1939 – 27 December 1939
- Oberst Alexander Holle, 27 December 1939 – 31 January 1940
- Oberst Hans-Detlef Herhudt von Rohden, 20 February 1941 – 30 September 1941
- Oberst Torsten Christ, 26 May 1942 – 23 February 1943
- Oberst Anselm Brasser, 23 February 1943 – 30 November 1943
- Oberst Walter Storp, 1 December 1943 – 31 May 1944
