= Luftflotte 4 =

- Flag for the Chief of a Luftflotte
- Active: 18 March 1939
- Disbanded: 21 April 1945
- Country: Nazi Germany
- Branch: Luftwaffe
- Type: Command
- Engagements: Eastern Front

Commanders
- Notable commanders: Alexander Löhr; Wolfram von Richthofen

Luftflotte 4 (Air Fleet 4) was one of the primary divisions of the German Luftwaffe in World War II. It was formed on 18 March 1939, from Luftwaffenkommando Österreich in Vienna. This Luftwaffe detachment was based in Romania, Bulgaria, Southeast Poland, Hungary, Ukraine and Russian occupied territories, for supporting Axis forces; with command offices in Morczyn, Hungary, during 26 June 1944, Eastern Front. Luftflotte 4 was responsible for the bombing campaign of Stalingrad. The Luftflotte was redesignated on 21 April 1945, to Luftwaffenkommando 4, and became subordinated to Luftflotte 6.

See Organization of the Luftwaffe (1933–1945) for explanation of abbreviations used below.

== Component units ==
=== Strategic reconnaissance ===
- 2.(F)/11 (Jasionka)
- 2.(F)/22 (Focșani)
- 2.(F)/100 (Lublin)

=== Transports (special duties) ===
- 14 St./Transportgeschwader 4 (Odessa)

=== I. Fliegerkorps (I. Air Corps) Focșani ===
Strategic reconnaissance

- 3.(F)/121 (Ziliștea)
- NSt.1 (Focșani)

Tactical reconnaissance

- Stab/NAGr.1(Chișinău)
- 2/NAGr.16 (Chișinău)
- Stab/NAGr.14(Comrat)
- 1./NAGr.14 (Comrat)
- 2./NAGr.14 (Bacău)

Maritime reconnaissance

- Stab/FAGr.125(See) (Constanța)
- 1.(F)/125 (See) (Varna, Bulgaria)
- 3.(F)/125 (See) (Mamaia)
- (Rum)A.St.22/1 (Ciocârlia)
- (Rum)101.A.St. (Mamaia)
- (Bulg)See. A.St.(Varna, Bulgaria)

Fighter

- Stab/JG 52 (Manzar)
- I./JG 52 (Leipzig, Romania)
- II./JG 52 (Manzar)
- III./JG 52 (Roman)
- 15(Kroat.)/JG 52 (Ziliștea)

Ground attack

- Stab/SG 2 (Huși)
- I./SG 2 (Huși)
- II./SG 2 (Ziliștea)
- III./SG 2 (Huși)
- II./SG 10 (Culm)
- 10.(Pz)/SG 2 (Trotuș)
- 14.(Pz)/SG 2 (Trotuș)

Night ground attack

- Stab/NSGr.5 (Manzar)
- 1./NSGr.5 (Roman)
- 2./NSGr.5 (Chișinău)
- 3./NSGr.5 (Chișinău)

Bomber (medium)

- I./KG.4 (Focșani)

=== VIII. Fliegerkorps (VIII Air Corps) Lubien Poland ===
Strategic reconnaissance

- 2.(F)/11 (Jasionka)
- 2.(F)/100 (Lubin)

Tactical reconnaissance

- Stab/NAGr.2(Strunybaby)
- 1./NAGr.2(Strunybaby)
- 2./NAGr.2(Strunybaby)

Land air strike

- Stab IV(Pz)/SG.9 (Lisiatycze)
- 12.(Pz)/SG.9 (Strunybaby)
- 13.(Pz)/SG.9 (Lisiatycze)
- Stab./SG.77 (Jasionka)
- I./SG.77 (Jasionka)
- II./SG.77 (Lemberg)
- III./SG.77 (Cuniów)
- 10.(Pz)/SG.77 (Starzawa)
- (Ung)S.St. G.102/1 (Cuniów)
- (Ung)(101 C.O.)St. G.101 (Börgönd-Balaton)

Night land attack

- Stab/NSGr.4 (Hordinia)
- 1./NSGr.4 (Hordinia)

Bombers

- 14.(Eis.)KG.27 (Krosno)

=== Fliegerführer 102 Ungarn (102 Air Direction in Hungary) Łabunie ===
Tactical reconnaissance

- (Ung)N.A.St.102/1 (Łabunie)
- 7./NAGr.32 (Łabunie)

Fighters

- (Ung)J.St.102/1 (Zamość)

Bombers

- (Ung)K.St.102/1 (Klemensowo)

Fast bombers

- (Ung)SK.St.102/1 (Klemensowo)

=== Rumänisches I Fliegerkorps (I Romanian Air Corps) Tecuci ===
Strategic/tactical reconnaissance

- (Rum)2.(F) A.St. (Ivești)
- (Rum)102 A.St. (Vâlcov)
- (Rum)(C.A.1)1A.St.(Bacău)

Fighters

- (Rum)II./JG.3 (Bacău)
- (Rum)65./J.St. (Bacău)
- (Rum)66./J.St. (Bacău)
- (Rum)67./J.St. (Bacău)
- (Rum)Stab/IV.JGr.45 (Ianca)
- (Rum).45 J.St. (Ianca)
- (Rum).46 J.St. (Ianca)
- (Rum).49 J.St. (Ianca)
- (Rum).IX JGr. (Tecuci)
- (Rum).47 J.St.(Tecuci)
- (Rum).48 J.St.(Tecuci)
- (Rum).56 J.St.(Tecuci)

Tactical support (dive bombers)

- (Rum)StG.3 (Călimănești?) StG is Sturzkampfgeschwader, dive bombers
- (Rum)StG.4 (Huși)
- (Rum)StG.8 (Matca)
- (Rum)(G.P.)StG.3(Detach) (Odessa)
- (Rum)(G.P.)StG.3 (Cioara-Doicești)

Bombers

- (Rum)KG.2 (Țăndărei)
- (Rum)KG.4 (Țăndărei)
- (Rum)76 K.St.(Ianca)
- (Rum)78 K.St.(Ianca)
- (Rum)V KGr. (Ivești)
- (Rum)K.St.1/3 (Ciocârlia)

=== Kom. Gen.d.dtsch. Lw.i. Rum (general in chief of German Air Force in Romania) Bucharest ===
Jagdabschnittsführer Rum. (chief of sector fighters of Romania) Bucharest

Fighters

- I./JG.53 (Târgșoru Nou)
- III./JG.77 (Mizil)
- (Rum)I./JG.2 (Roșiori)
- (Rum)43.J.St.(Roșiori)
- (Rum)63.J.St.(Roșiori)
- (Rum)64.J.St.(Roșiori)
- (Rum)VI./JG.2 (Popești-Leordeni)
- (Rum)59./VI JGr.(Popești-Leordeni)
- (Rum)61./VI JGr.(Popești-Leordeni)
- (Rum)62./VI JGr.(Popești-Leordeni)
- (Rum)VII.JGr. (Boteni)
- (Rum)53./VII.J.St (Boteni)
- (Rum)57./VII.J.St.(Boteni)
- (Rum)51.J.St. (Țepeș Vodă)
- (Rum)52.J.St. (Mamaia)
- (Rum)58.J.St. (Pipera)

Night fighters

- 10./NJG.6 (Otopeni-Bucharest)
- 12./NJG.6 (Otopeni-Bucharest)
- 11./(Detach)NJG.100 (Otopeni-Bucharest)
- 4./(N)JG.301 (Mizil)
- 6./(N)JG.301 (Târgșoru Nou)
- (Rum)1./NJ.St. (Otopeni-Bucharest)

== Commanding officers ==
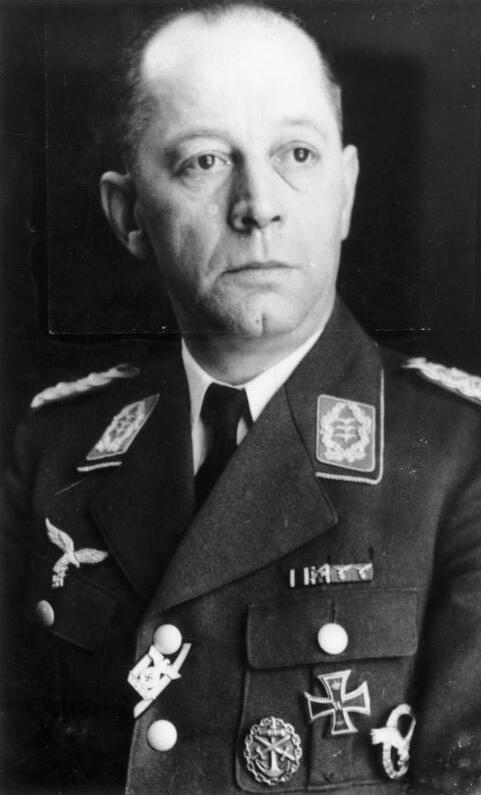
Oberst Herbert Olbrich

- Generaloberst Alexander Löhr, 18 March 1939 – 20 July 1942
- Generalfeldmarschall Wolfram von Richthofen, 20 July 1942 – 4 September 1943
- Generaloberst Otto Deßloch, 4 September 1943 – 17 August 1944
- Generalleutnant Alexander Holle, 25 August 1944 – 27 September 1944
- Generaloberst Otto Deßloch, 28 September 1944 – 21 April 1945

=== Chief of staff ===
- Oberst Günther Korten, 18 March 1939 – 19 December 1939
- Oberst Herbert Olbrich, 19 December 1939 – 21 July 1940
- Oberst Andreas Nielsen, 21 July 1940 – 3 November 1940
- Oberst Richard Schimpf, 4 November 1940 – 15 January 1941
- Generalleutnant Günther Korten, 15 January 1941 – 12 August 1942
- Oberst Hans-Detlef Herhudt von Rohden, 24 August 1942 – 23 February 1943
- Oberst Karl-Heinrich Schulz, 1 March 1943 – 25 March 1943
- General Otto Deßloch, 26 March 1943 – 3 September 1943
- Generalmajor Karl-Heinrich Schulz, 3 September 1943 – 21 April 1945
