= Karl-Heinrich Schulz =

- Born: 6 May 1906; Wilhelmshaven, German Empire
- Died: 28 July 1986 (aged 80); Dießen am Ammersee, West Germany
- Military career
- Allegiance: Weimar Republic (to 1933); Nazi Germany
- Branch: Reichsmarine (1924–1935); Kriegsmarine (1935); Luftwaffe (1935–1945)
- Service years: 1924–1945
- Rank: Generalmajor
- Unit: Luftflotte 4
- Conflicts: World War II
- Awards: Knight's Cross of the Iron Cross

Karl-Heinrich Schulz (6 May 1906 – 28 July 1986) was a highly decorated Generalmajor in the Luftwaffe during World War II. He was also a recipient of the Knight's Cross of the Iron Cross. Karl-Heinrich Schulz was captured by Allied troops in May 1945 and was held until December 1947.

== Awards and decorations ==
- Iron Cross (1939)
  - 2nd Class
  - 1st Class
- German Cross in Gold (27 July 1942)
- Knight's Cross of the Iron Cross on 9 June 1944 as Generalmajor and Chef des Generalstabes (Chief of Staff) of Luftflotte 4

Military offices
Preceded by Oberst Hans-Detlef Herhudt von Rohden	Chief of Staff of Luftflotte 4; 1 March 1943 – 25 March 1943	Succeeded by Generaloberst Otto Deßloch
Preceded by Generaloberst Otto Deßloch	Chief of Staff of Luftflotte 4; 3 September 1943 – 21 April 1945	Succeeded by None
