= Alexander Holle =

German General

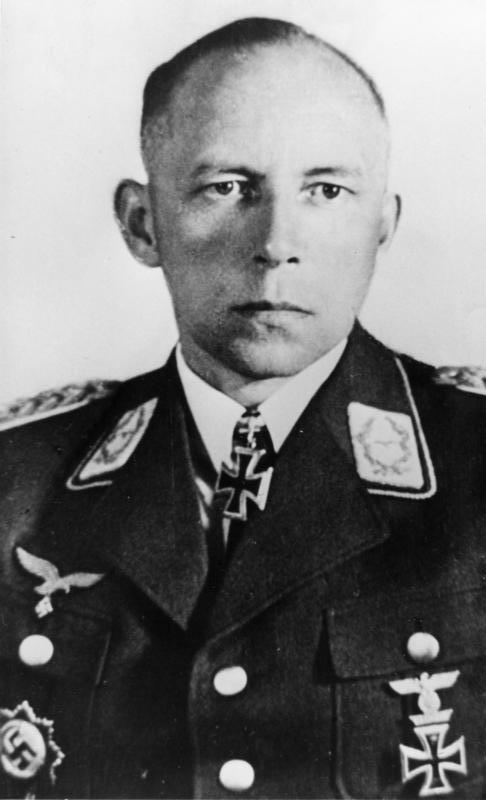
- Alexander Holle
- Born: 27 February 1898
- Died: 16 July 1978 (aged 80)
- Military career
- Allegiance: German Empire; Weimar Republic; Nazi Germany
- Branch: Luftwaffe
- Rank: Generalleutnant
- Commands: Kampfgeschwader 26; 10th Air Corps; Luftflotte 4 Luftflotte 3
- Conflicts: World War I: Battle of the Somme; Battle of Château-Thierry (1918); ---> World War II
- Awards: Knight's Cross of the Iron Cross

Alexander Holle (27 February 1898 – 16 July 1978) was a German general (Generalleutnant) in the Luftwaffe's Condor Legion during the German involvement in the Spanish Civil War, and World War II. He was a recipient of the Knight's Cross of the Iron Cross of Nazi Germany.

From 8 May 1945 to February 1948, Holle was a prisoner of war. After his release he married on 12 May 1948 and had a daughter.

On 16 July 1978, he died in Munich and was buried with a military honor guard.

== Awards and decorations ==
- German Cross in Gold on 11 May 1942 as Oberst with Kampfgeschwader 26
- Knight's Cross of the Iron Cross on 30 December 1942 as Oberst and as Fliegerführer Nord and Geschwaderkommodore of Kampfgeschwader 26.

Military offices
Preceded by Oberst Robert Fuchs	Commander of Kampfgeschwader 26; 15 October 1940 – June 1941	Succeeded by Oberst Martin Harlinghausen
Preceded by Oberst Hermann Busch	Commander of Fliegerführer Nord (Ost); 15 October 1940 – August 1943	Succeeded by Oberst der Reserve Ernst Kühl
Preceded by General der Flieger Otto Hoffmann von Waldau	Commander of X. Fliegerkorps; 1 January 1943 – 22 May 1943	Succeeded by General der Flieger Martin Fiebig
Preceded by Generaloberst Otto Deßloch	Commander of Luftflotte 4; 25 August 1944 – 27 September 1944	Succeeded by Generaloberst Otto Deßloch
Preceded by Generaloberst Otto Deßloch	Commander of Luftflotte 3; 22 September 1944 – 26 September 1944	Succeeded by Redesignated as Luftwaffenkommando West
Preceded by Previously Luftflotte 3	Commander of Luftwaffenkommando West; 26 September 1944 – 11 December 1944	Succeeded by Generalleutnant Joseph Schmid
Preceded by General der Flieger Rudolf Meister	Commander of Deutschen Luftwaffe in Dänemark; 15 December 1944 – 8 May 1945	Succeeded by None
