= Wolfram von Richthofen =

German military officer and aviator (1895–1945)

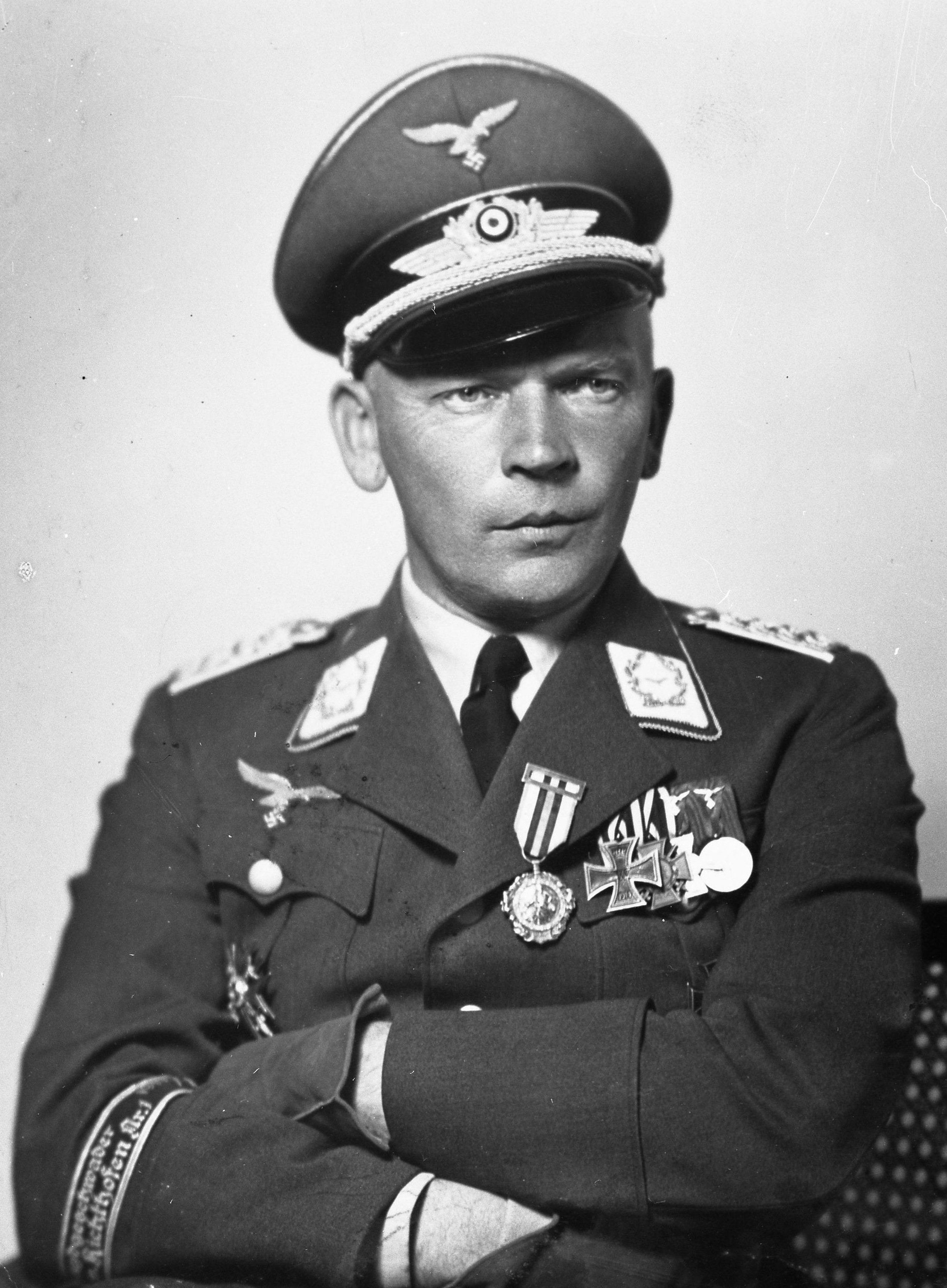
- Richthofen in 1940
- Born: Wolfram Karl Ludwig Moritz Hermann Freiherr von Richthofen; 10 October 1895; Barzdorf, Silesia, Prussia, German Empire
- Died: 12 July 1945 (aged 49); Bad Ischl, Gmunden, Allied-occupied Austria
- Military career
- Allegiance: German Empire; Nazi Germany
- Branch: Luftstreitkräfte; Luftwaffe
- Service years: 1913–1944
- Rank: Generalfeldmarschall
- Units: Jasta 11
- Commands: Condor Legion, 8th Air Corps, Luftflotte 2, Luftflotte 4
- Wars: World War I; Spanish Civil War; World War II
- Awards: Knight's Cross of the Iron Cross with Oak Leaves

Wolfram Karl Ludwig Moritz Hermann Freiherr von Richthofen (10 October 1895 – 12 July 1945) was a German World War I flying ace who rose to the rank of Generalfeldmarschall (Field Marshal) in the Luftwaffe during World War II.

In the First World War, Richthofen fought on the Western and Eastern Fronts as a cavalry officer until 1917. He joined the Luftstreitkräfte (German Imperial Air Service) after his cousins, brothers Lothar and Manfred ('The Red Baron'), both of whom became flying aces. On his first mission in Jagdgeschwader 1 (Fighter Wing 1), Manfred was killed while chasing a fighter that attacked Wolfram. Wolfram went on to claim eight aerial victories before the armistice in November 1918. After the war, Richthofen joined the Reichswehr and became a member of the Luftwaffe after Hitler's rise to power in 1933. He served as part of the Condor Legion which supported the Nationalists in the Spanish Civil War. During this time, he recognised the need for close air support in military campaigns and championed the dive bomber. He also made innovations in ground-air communications.

When the Second World War broke out, Richthofen commanded a specialised ground-attack air unit, Fliegerkorps VIII (8th Air Corps), first as a small active service unit in the Polish Campaign, and then as a full-sized Air Corps in Western Europe, from May to June 1940. His unit proved to be decisive at certain points in the French Campaign, particularly covering the German thrust to the English Channel. He continued to command air units in the Battle of Britain and the Balkans Campaign in 1940 and 1941. Richthofen achieved his greatest success on the Eastern Front. In particular, the Crimean Campaigns of 1942, where his forces offered vital tactical and operational support to Army Group South. Afterwards he commanded Luftwaffe forces in the Italian Campaign before retiring in late 1944 on medical grounds. Richthofen died in July 1945 of a brain tumour while in American captivity.

Richthofen's reputation, according to his biographer, James Corum, was of a competent but ruthless practitioner of air power. Richthofen is not considered a war criminal for his command of air forces, but he knew of the German mistreatment of Soviet prisoners of war, and was marginally involved in disseminating orders pertaining to their treatment—though the Luftwaffe in general had only partial responsibility for them.

== Early life ==
Richthofen was born on 10 October 1895, at the Richthofen Barzdorf (now Bartoszówek, Poland) estate (Gut Barzdorf), near Striegau (Strzegom), Lower Silesia to an aristocratic family. His father, Wolfram Freiherr von Richthofen (1856–1922), and mother, Therese Gotz von Olenhusen (1862–1948) were of the Silesian nobility, and the family had been ennobled 350 years before Wolfram's birth.

Richthofen was the second child and oldest son of four children. His older sister, Sophie-Therese, was born in 1891 (and died in 1971). His brother Manfred was born in 1898 and Gerhard in 1902. He was the fourth cousin of the German World War I flying ace Manfred von Richthofen, popularly known as the "Red Baron", and the baron's younger brother Lothar von Richthofen. As the son of a nobleman, he enjoyed a life of privilege. The family's noble status dated back to the 1500s, and by the 1700s the Richthofens owned 16 estates in Lower Silesia. When Frederick the Great annexed Silesia in 1740, he personally granted the title of Baron (Freiherr) to one of Richthofen's direct ancestors. The family remained in Silesia for a further three generations.

Richthofen's home, an eighteenth-century estate, was only one of 25 Richthofen-owned properties totalling 140 square kilometres (35,000 acres; 54 sq mi). Barzdorf, where he lived, was a modest 350 hectares (860 acres; 1.4 sq mi), of which 269 was farmed and the rest was forest. Wolfram, as the oldest son did not inherit the estate. Instead, on the death of his father in 1922, it was given to his younger brother, Manfred. Some years before, Wolfram's uncle General of Cavalry Manfred von Richthofen, his father's brother, had asked him to inherit his estate to keep it in the family, as he himself had no children. Wolfram inherited the estate after Manfred legally adopted him. The general died in 1939.

He had a distant relationship with his youngest brother, but a close one with Manfred. Unlike most Prussian nobles Wolfram von Richthofen went to the local Gymnasium (academic high school) and did not have private tutors at home. He attended school in Striegau. His grades in mathematics and German language were good, but he did not excel at foreign languages (in which he scored average to poor results). He found studying language to be boring, but did learn Italian and could converse competently in it in later life.

He became a close friend of his cousins, Lothar and Manfred von Richthofen, and hunted game at the estate with them regularly. By the end of his teens, he had become an established hunter and horse rider – interests which remained with him for the rest of his life. He enjoyed being outdoors and, while still at school, opted to apply for a commission in the German Army (rather than choose an academic career).

In 1913, at the age of 18, he joined the army and took the officer course in Berlin. The Cavalry was the most prestigious arm, and he applied to join the 4th Hussars which belonged to the 12th Cavalry Brigade of the Sixth Army Corps in Breslau. He did not have much time to experience peacetime military service. In August 1914 the First World War began. He completed flight training in the fall of 1917 and in the spring of 1918 joined Jagdgeschwader 11, his cousin Baron Manfred von Richthofen's new command. It was 21 April 1918 that Wolfram was attacked by British planes while on patrol with his squadron; Manfred von Richthofen was killed in the same action the same day.

On 18 September 1920, he married Jutta von Selchow (March 1896 – 1991) at a Lutheran church in Breslau (now the city of Wrocław in Poland). They had been introduced by her brother Gunther. Jutta was also of Silesian nobility, and had moved in the same circles. She had served as a nurse in the war. They lived in an apartment in Hanover while Wolfram restarted his academic career in Engineering. During their marriage they rarely traveled abroad in the 1920s. In the 1930s they took skiing holidays in Switzerland. The couple had three children; Wolfram (born 25 May 1922), Götz (27 November 1925) and Ellen (15 February 1928). Wolfram Jr. was posted missing in action over northern Romania on 5 June 1944. He was never found.

== World War I ==
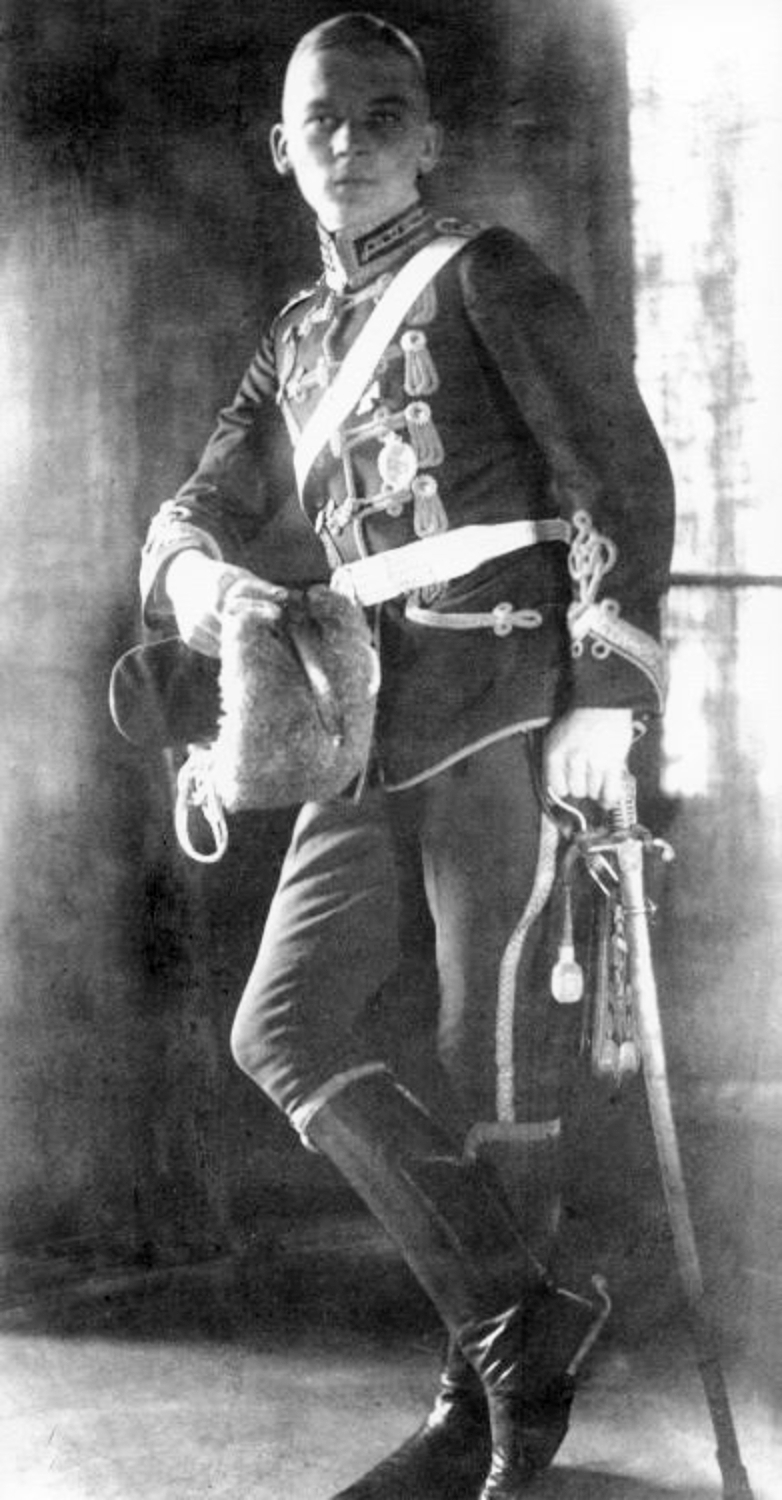
Richthofen in hussar uniform at age 18, shortly after his commission on the eve of World War I, 1914

The Hussars of the 12th Cavalry Brigade were attached to the 5th Cavalry Division, which was part of the First Cavalry Corps. It formed part of the German Third Army which carried out the attack on France and Belgium in August 1914 as part of the long-prepared Schlieffen Plan. Richthofen crossed the Meuse at Dinant, and his unit was involved in heavy action against the French VIII Cavalry Corps. It fought in Belgium at Namur on 23–24 August during the siege of the city and again at Saint-Quentin. The 5th Cavalry continued its drive into France after the Battle of the Frontiers, but was stopped at the First Battle of the Marne in September. In recognition for bravery in combat, Richthofen was awarded the Iron Cross Second Class (Eisernes Kreuz zweiter Klasse) on 21 September 1914. The new combat environment of trench warfare greatly lessened the effectiveness of cavalry, so Richthofen's division was transferred to the Eastern Front, arriving in Poland in November 1915.

On the Eastern Front, the Cavalry Division was mostly deployed in the south. It saw little fighting, as the German army did not use cavalry frequently, and the division was kept mainly in reserve. Richthofen's brigade served near Pinsk in 1916, and the division would spend late 1915 to January 1917 on defensive duties in the Pripet Marshes. Richthofen was given command of the horse depot of the Brigade in the autumn of 1916 and was promoted to Squadron Commander, with 160 men under his command. This was never going to garner him the level of fame his cousins, Lothar and Manfred, were now achieving in the Luftstreitkräfte (Imperial Air Service), and they personally encouraged him to transfer to the air service, which he finally did in June 1917.

=== Luftstreitkräfte ===
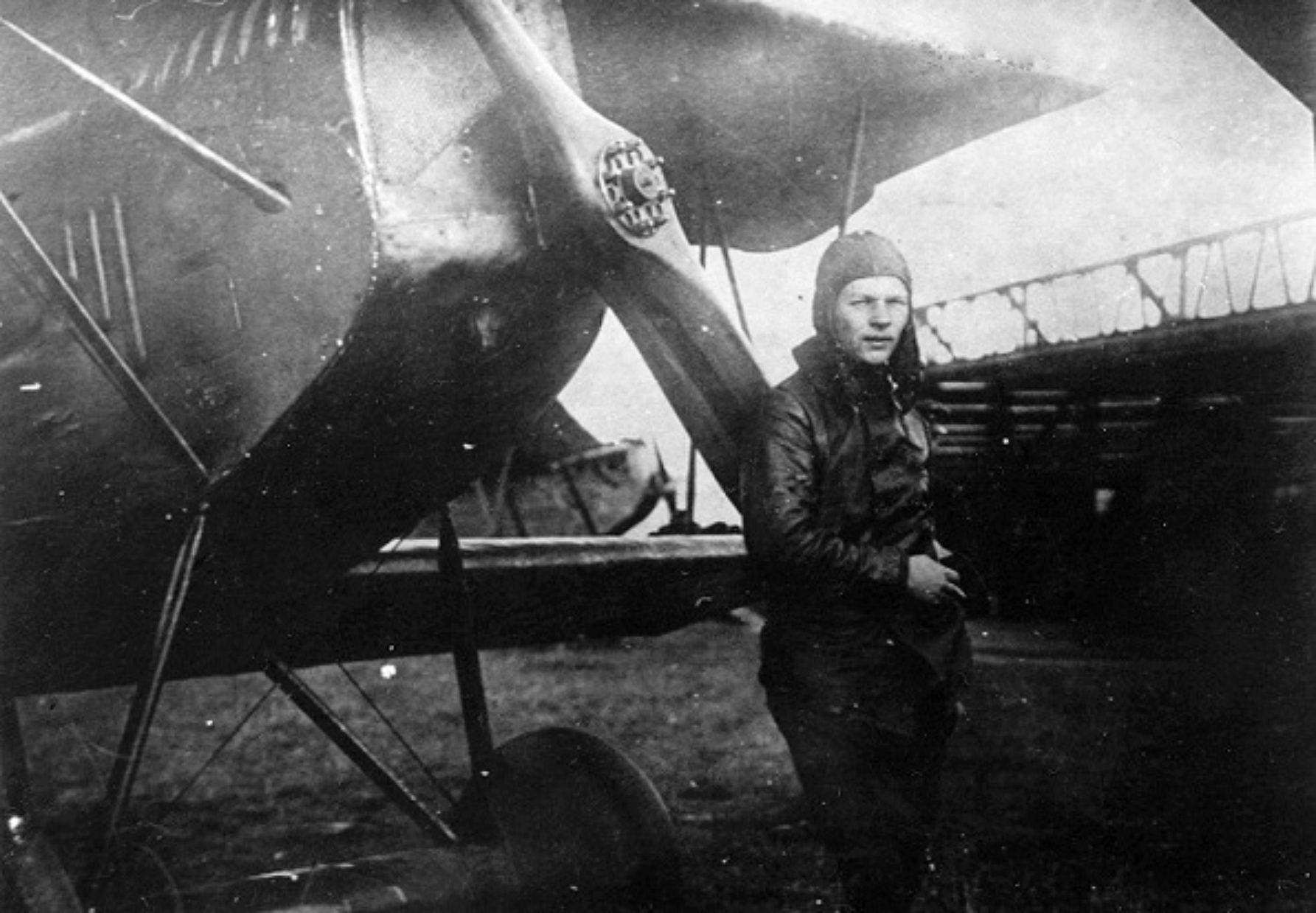
Richthofen in front of his Fokker D.VII fighter, summer 1918

Before he joined the Air Service, Richthofen was given leave in Germany until he reported to the 14th Flying Replacement Regiment based at Halle, one of several large flight schools. At this point in the war, German training was more thorough and longer than that of the British Royal Flying Corps (RFC) and at least equal to that of the French Air Force and the United States Army Air Service (USAAS). His training lasted three months, and he was assigned to the 11th Flying Replacement Battalion for advanced training in March 1918.

On 4 April 1918, Richthofen was assigned to Jagdgeschwader 1, commanded by his cousin Manfred von Richthofen. On 21 April, Wolfram flew his first mission. As he was a new pilot, Manfred instructed him to avoid the fighting. When the squadron became engaged in a dogfight, Wolfram climbed and circled above the fray. RAF Lieutenant Wilfred May, also a new pilot, was also circling above the dogfight. He attacked and pursued Richtofen. On seeing his cousin being attacked, Manfred flew to his rescue and fired on May, causing him to pull away and saving Wolfram's life. Richthofen pursued May across the Somme. It was in this pursuit that Manfred was killed in action.

Wolfram continued flying and went on to claim eight aerial victories in the Fokker D.VII before the armistice ended the war on 11 November 1918.

== Luftwaffe ==
Richthofen studied aeronautical engineering from 1919 to 1922 at the Technische Hochschule in Hanover. He served in Rome between 1929 and 1931 as an "informal" air attache, in violation of the disarmament clauses of the Versailles Treaty. Richthofen gained a Ph.D. in the subject.

In 1933 Richthofen joined the Luftwaffe, which was commanded by his former commanding officer at JG 1, in 1918, Hermann Göring. By 1934 he was in charge of developing and testing new aircraft in the Technisches Amt, or Technical Service, under the overall direction of Ernst Udet. Although Richthofen had known Göring, having served under him in the First World War in JG 1, the two did not get along. They both came from aristocratic backgrounds, but Richthofen was a Silesian from Lower Silesia, a driven commander, and a good and hard working staff officer who enjoyed the company of engineers and like-minded men, while Göring was a Bavarian and a playboy who enjoyed talking about the First World War and his time as an ace and particularly enjoyed the trappings of power. Göring preferred men like himself, and promoted them on that basis. He passed over the more highly qualified Richthofen in favour of Udet, a hard drinker and playboy, who like Göring had grown up in Bavaria, to head the Technisches Amt.

Richthofen's role was mainly concerned with aircraft procurement programs for the fledgling Luftwaffe. He was involved in the development of types such as the Dornier Do 23, Heinkel He 111 and Junkers Ju 86. In the event, only the He 111 would make a real impact during the war. Richthofen was following a considerably difficult assignment, stemming from a directive issued to the Reichswehr before Adolf Hitler's rise to power. In July 1932, the Reichswehr had been pursuing the Schnellbomber (fast bomber) concept. The need for modern and fast bombers was to meet the future vision of air warfare for bombers that were faster than fighter aircraft. These concepts became even more important when Hitler seized power and issued demands for rapid rearmament.

As the 1930s progressed the He 111 was refined, and the Dornier Do 17 Schnellbomber entered planning, production and service in 1936–37. Even so, Göring was still interested in the heavy bomber program, which would give the Luftwaffe a firm strategic bombing capability. Richthofen was dubious about the employment of heavy bombers, and wanted the projects developing types like the Dornier Do 19 cancelled. Unfortunately for Richthofen, for the time being, the Luftwaffe's first Chief of the General Staff, Walter Wever, did believe in the heavy bomber program. The development of what Wever called the "Ural bomber" designs continued. At the time, Göring and Wever also required a long-range fighter escort design for protecting the bombers over Britain and the Soviet Union, Germany's expected enemies. Richthofen joined Wever in moderating some of the design requests made by Göring, who insisted on a fast, fighter, bomber, ground attack and reconnaissance aircraft rolled into one design. Viewing the request as impossible, Richthofen used his position to split the specification into separate designs on 22 January 1935.

Wever was killed in an air accident in June 1936, and the emphasis shifted back to more economical (in manpower and material terms) medium bombers. After Wever's death, Göring and Ernst Udet became more active in the development programs. Udet favoured the close support designs, such as the Junkers Ju 87 Stuka dive bomber, while Göring favoured having more medium bombers rather than a small number of heavy bombers. Richthofen did not get along with Udet, and did not believe in his ideas about dive bombing. Udet, much like Göring, favoured combining the qualities of aircraft. Udet sought out a design that could dog fight, dive bomb and carry out level bombing, much like Göring had requested. This was at odds with Richthofen's fundamental desire for aircraft that were easy to mass-produce and were designed to excel at specialised tasks.

Although Richthofen had managed to prevent aircraft design from heading into mediocrity, and had kept them specialised for particular tasks, Udet still influenced the selection of the multi-purpose Messerschmitt Bf 110 and the Schnellbomber (fast bomber) designed Junkers Ju 88 by the end of 1936. With the Ju 88, he insisted it should have a dive bombing capability, although it was more suited to, and ideal for, the level bombing Schnellbomber concept. By the autumn, 1936, Richthofen decided he had had enough of working with Udet, whose ideas he thought were totally wrong. With an expanding Luftwaffe and a civil war starting in Spain, an opportunity came for a field command.

== Spanish Civil War ==
In November 1936, Richthofen left the Technical Service staff to take a field command in the Condor Legion, a Luftwaffe contingent sent to support General Francisco Franco's Nationalists in the Spanish Civil War. Udet continued with the dive bomber concept and the Ju 87 first saw action under Richthofen's command in Spain. Wolfram retained his position as Head of Development, but he was now tasked with the evaluation of aircraft under operational conditions. His role expanded in January 1937, and he became Chief of Staff to Hugo Sperrle, who was to command the Legion.

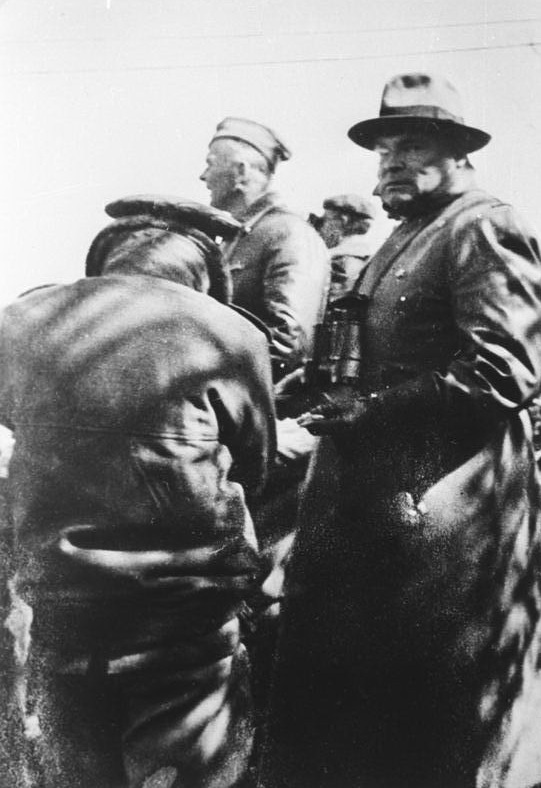
Hugo Sperrle, with Richthofen, somewhere in Spain (1936)

=== Tactical aviation ===
Richthofen's experiences were to serve the Luftwaffe well in the long-term and he was leading proponent of army support aviation at this time. His own learning curve in the war highlighted several issues that a modern air force would have to overcome. The most important issues concerned tactical and operational level warfare. The Germans put a great deal of effort into developing close air support doctrine in the late 1930s. Tactically, Richthofen found little need to retain anti-aircraft artillery to defend airfields. He pushed Flak units into the frontline to bolster the artillery units. Rapid fire 20 mm calibres and 88 mm weapons were first used in Spain and their effectiveness was reported to Berlin. Soon this tactic became part of Luftwaffe doctrine.

Another tactical consideration led to operational innovation. Richthofen adopted the shuttle air tactic. In order to maximise support over the frontline, aircraft operated from bases near the front to keep and gain an advantage. It was very successful in the 1937 battles. Aircraft were sent in small formations to bomb frontline positions, while other groups of ground attack aircraft were en route and refuelling. This way a constant air presence was maintained over the battlefield, which eroded the effectiveness and morale of the enemy. In order for this to be able to work effectively, three or more sorties needed to be flown per day. This required a large number of personnel to set up and man forward airfields. At the operational level, the Luftwaffe's logistics units had to be completely motorised to bring in fuel, ammunition and spare parts. These units had the opportunity to be tested under tough operational conditions. The experience in Spain had shown air transport units were invaluable to logistics, and with Richthofen's input, were expanded accordingly. By 1939, the Luftwaffe would have the largest, and most capable transport service in the World.

Richthofen employed these learned tactics and operational methods during the Battle of Bilbao. The motorised logistics also helped during the rapid redeployment to the south, after the surprise Republican offensive at Brunete in July 1937. Air support was vital in defeating the offensive, which was supported by modern aircraft sent to the Republicans from the Soviet Union. German types like the Messerschmitt Bf 109 fighter, which replaced the Heinkel He 51, Do 17 and He 111, helped win and hold air superiority and interdict the battlefield. The Republicans had spent most of their gold reserves on buying Soviet equipment. With most of that equipment used up, the Condor Legion and Nationalists gained the technological edge.

The Spanish experience began a late surge of interest in close support aircraft within the Luftwaffe. In the first years of the Nazi state, these types had remained a low-priority for air planners who shaped the embryonic Luftwaffe. This apparent regression from the practices and experiences of World War I stemmed from the belief among the General Staff (Oberkommando der Luftwaffe) that army support aviation in 1917–1918 was purely a reaction to trench warfare. The German Heer also did not insist that the Luftwaffe change its approach at this time. German air doctrine remained rooted in the fundamentals of Operativer Luftkrieg (Operational Air War) which stressed interdiction, Strategic bombing (when and if possible) but primarily the air supremacy mission. The Spanish experience encouraged the General Staff to embrace the dive-bomber concept, for which Richthofen was partly responsible, but the influence of the conflict on German operational preferences remain ambiguous. On the eve of World War II, some German air planners regarded the dive-bomber as a strategic weapon to strike with precision at enemy industry. Even factored into the army support groups, only fifteen percent of Luftwaffe front-line strength contained specialist ground-attack aircraft in September 1939.

=== Operational experience ===
The most difficult aspect of close support was communication. Air-ground liaison officers had been used since 1935, when the Luftwaffe first set up a training program for this purpose. By 1937, precise procedures had yet to be worked through for air to ground coordination. Staff officers were trained to solve operational problems, and the lack of doctrine and reluctance of the Oberkommando der Luftwaffe (OKL = High Command of the Air Force) to micromanage gave Sperrle and Richthofen a free hand to devise solutions. Aircraft could not communicate with the frontline. Instead, they could communicate via radio with each other and their home base. One of the first innovations was to prepare signals staff on the frontline in the region of any planned air strikes, and equip them with telephones. The forward officers could telephone the base with updates, who in turn could radio the aircraft. It became an important standard operational practice. Liaison officers were attached to the Nationalist Army, and improved coordination continued in the second half of 1937 despite occasional friendly-fire incidents. In the Second World War, the Luftwaffe air units and liaison officers at the front could communicate directly, with updated radios.

The Luftwaffe entered the Second World War with high standards of training. Although other air forces also had training programs and pilots equal to the Germans, the Luftwaffe emphasised training its large units, the Geschwader (Wings), Corps and Luftflotten (Air Fleet) staffs in large-scale manoeuvres with the army in the pre-war years. War games and communication exercises in a variety of different combat operations allowed the officers to familiarise themselves with mobile warfare, and this produced proficient doctrine and better prepared operational methods than most of its opponents had. With notable exceptions, such as RAF Fighter Command, most of the Allied air forces did not conduct large-scale unit and staff exercises, testing tactics and doctrine. Given the slight numerical and technological advantage of the Luftwaffe over its enemies in 1939–1941, its success during these years can largely be attributed to extensive officer and staff training programs along with the experiences of the Condor Legion in Spain.

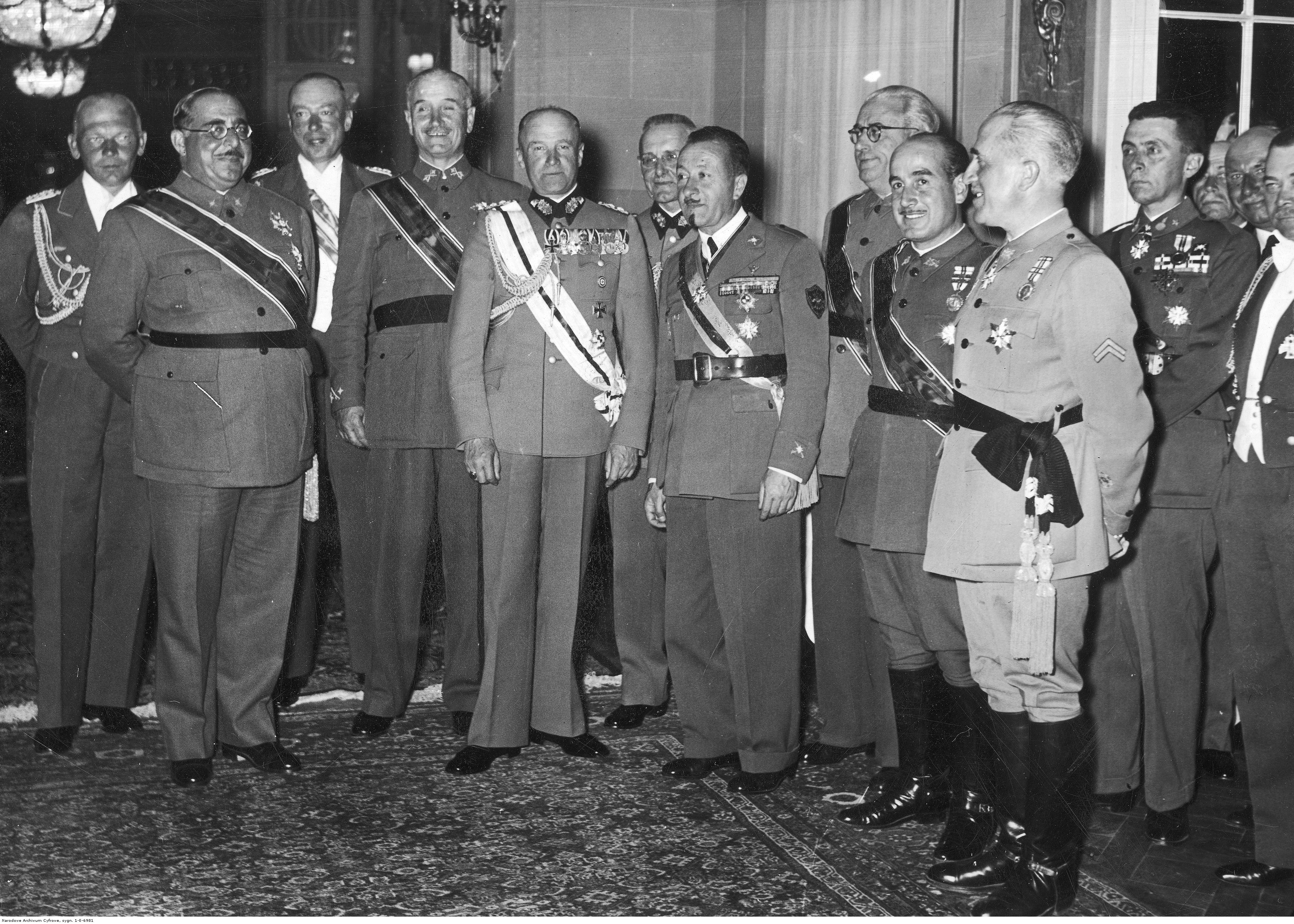
Richthofen (far left) with Walther von Brauchitsch (centre) and Franz Halder (over Brauchitsch's left shoulder), 7 June 1939.

Richthofen and Sperrle made an effective team in Spain. Sperrle was an experienced officer and was intelligent with a good reputation. Richthofen was considered a good leader in combat. They combined to advise and oppose Franco on a number of topics to prevent the misuse of air power, and debates were heated. Both German men were blunt with the Spanish leader, and although the Germans and Spanish did not like each other, they had a healthy respect which translated into an effective working relationship. Richthofen even learned a little Spanish and Italian, an effort appreciated by the Nationalist officers.

After Sperrle returned to Germany, Richthofen assumed command of the Condor Legion. Hellmuth Volkmann assumed his place, but his pessimistic reports to Berlin, his continued demands for support and resources, and his personal disagreements with Richthofen forced his replacement in October 1938. Richthofen was promoted to the rank of Generalmajor on 1 November 1938, and he oversaw the final stages of the civil war in early 1939. By this time, his belief in the Junkers Ju 87 Stuka was cemented. It had proved highly successful in its limited role, and Richthofens's fear of excessive losses in low-level ground attack operations proved ill-founded.

=== Guernica controversy ===
During the Spanish Civil War, the Condor Legion bombed Guernica. Beginning soon afterward and continuing today, historians saw the attack as a deliberate act of terror bombing designed to break civilian morale. In April 1937 the town was located just behind the Republican frontline and Nationalist forces were applying pressure in the area. One possible reason for Richthofen sanctioning the bombing was that two main roads being used to supply 23 Basque battalions at Bilbao intersected at Guernica. At least the 18th Loyola and Saseta battalions were stationed in the city at the time, making it a legitimate target. The destruction of the road and train lines around Guernica, as well as the bridges, denied the Republicans an escape route as well as their only way to evacuate heavy equipment.

Some accounts of the raid, including defenses proffered after the fact by Condor Legion veterans, argued that the "poor accuracy" of German bomb sights in early 1937 was responsible for the carnage caused by the attack. Some facts suggest otherwise, however, fueling speculation that the raid was one of Richthofen's experiments in air warfare tactics. The Condor Legion had made systematic twenty-minute relays above the town over the course of two-and-a-half hours. Loads included anti-personnel twenty-pound bombs and incendiaries dropped in aluminum tubes that set fleeing livestock and humans alight with white phosphorus. Blackened bodies lay curled in the town square and streets and buried in the rubble of their homes. Current estimates from Basque historians put the number of killed in 153. Historians have pointed out that the key Renteria bridge just outside the town was never hit in the raid, that the attacking Condor Legion Junkers flew abreast over the town and not in line as they would to fell a bridge, and that anti-personnel bombs, incendiaries and machine gun bullets would not have been effective against stone structures like the Renteria bridge. "Guernica burning," Richthofen wrote in his war diary the day of the attack. Two days later he speculated that the town "must be totally destroyed."

By the 1937 rules of international warfare, Guernica was a legitimate target – a green light, in effect, for the air-war horrors to come. Richthofen had planned and executed the attack with the approval of the Spanish Nationalists. From a purely military perspective, it was a success, closing the city to traffic for 24 hours. A "technical success," Richthofen called it, disappointed that the Nationalists failed to follow it up quickly and so missed a chance to cut off large portions of the enemy forces.

== World War II ==
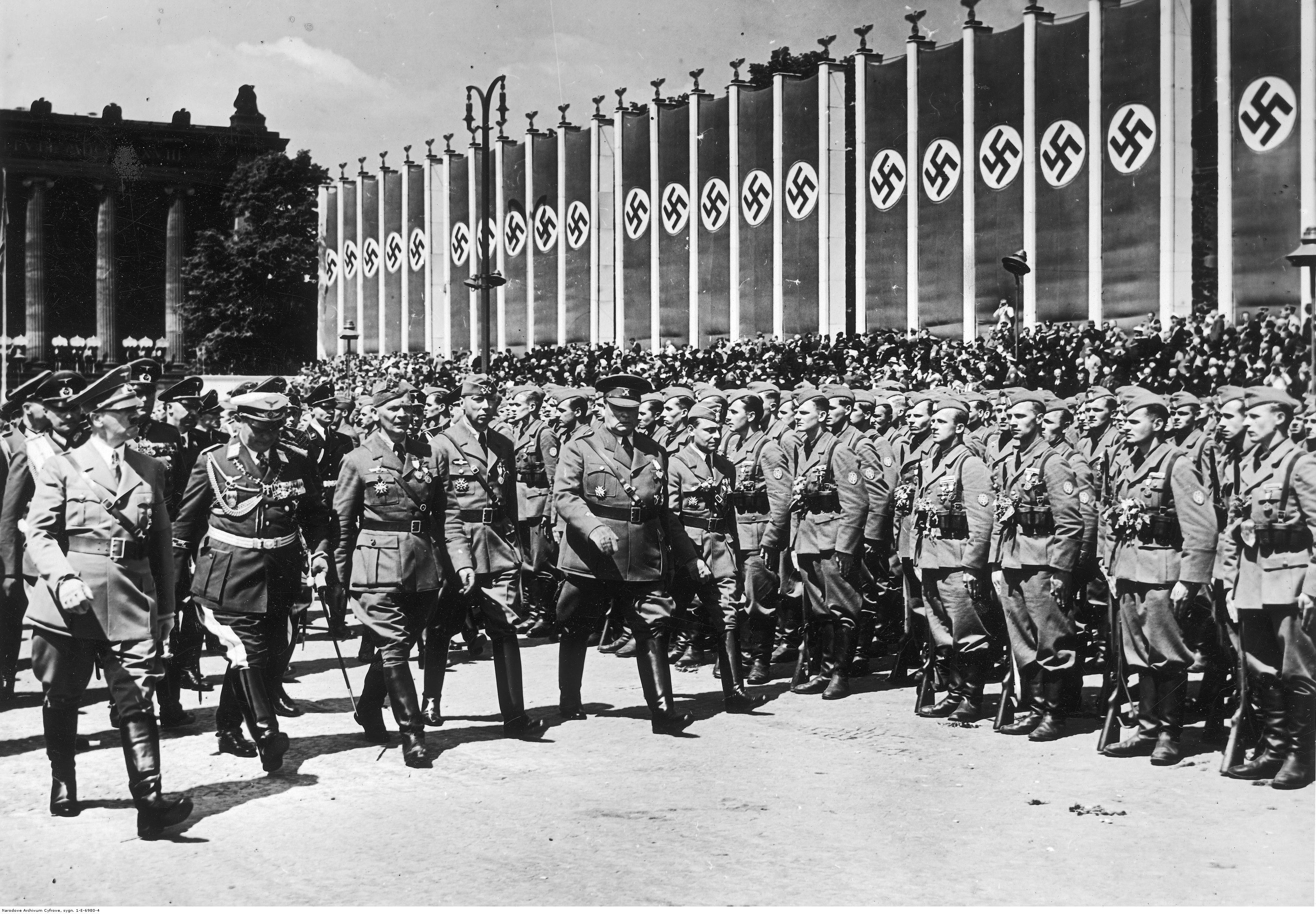
Adolf Hitler during a Condor Legion parade in Berlin. Next to him are Göring and Richthofen, June 1939

Richthofen commanded Fliegerführer z.b.V. (zur besonderen Verwendung—for special deployment) (Note: For an explanation of the terms Fliegerkorps and Luftflotte, see Luftwaffe Organization) during the invasion of Poland, which began on 1 September 1939, quickly triggering the war in Europe. This unit was a tactical formation and was attached to 2nd Fliegerdivision, under the joint command of Bruno Loerzer and Alexander Löhr. The operational goal of Fliegerführer z.b.V., was to support the 10th Army, under the command of Walter von Reichenau. The army contained the majority of the motorised and armoured units and was to form the focal point, or Schwerpunkt, of the offensive against Poland.

Richthofen's order of battle included a powerful concentration of strike aircraft. The formation had its headquarters at Birkental-Oppeln, but its units were spread out. Schlosswalden was home to 1.(F)/AufklGr (Aufklärungsgruppe—reconnaissance group) 124, which operated Dornier Do 17P aircraft. Lehrgeschwader 2 (Learning Wing 2), was based at Nieder-Ellguth, while the bulk of Sturzkampfgeschwader 77 (Dive Bombing Wing 77 or StG 77), which operated the Junkers Ju 87 Stuka, was based at Neudorf. Richthofen also commanded the Slovak Air Force units (Slovenské vzdušné zbrane), the 38th and 48th Fighter Squadrons, and the 16th Corps Squadron.

=== Invasion of Poland ===
On the first day of the offensive StG 77 was committed to counter-air operations, striking Polish Air Force (PAF) bases. The need for counter-air operations left only II.(Schlacht)/LG 2 for close support operations. The unit supported the German mechanised XVI Army Corps. Along with other units, Richthofen's I./StG 77 decimated a cavalry brigade of the Polish Armii Łódź during the Battle of Łódź.

Only eight days into the campaign, on 8 September, the Tenth Army had advanced so far into Poland, that Richthofen was obliged to move Günter Schwartzkopff, his most experienced dive-bomber exponent, into Polish airfields, while Reichenau closed in on Warsaw. Richthofen was able to keep logistical elements functioning, which kept units flying three sorties per day. At the end of the first week of September, Richthofen's battle group was transferred to Luftflotte 4 (Air Fleet 4).

The fast moving frontline caused army headquarters to lose touch with its forward units. The collapse of communications deprived commanders and squadrons of orders, a situation exacerbated by the lack of a common radio frequency and by over-stretched logistics, which also forced them to scavenge enemy supply depots. Richthofen was the most affected. As early as 3 September, he noted in his diary that the army headquarters had ceased to know where the frontline was, and he refused to respond to army requests for air support. Instead, he responded according to his own interpretation of the situation. This method did cause friendly fire incidents. On one occasion, Ju 87s knocked out a bridge across the Vistula river when a Panzer Division was about to cross.

The air-ground coordination was the responsibility of Kolufts, who synthesised data from their own aerial reconnaissance and forward units, but they were only advisers and had little experience in air warfare. They were controlled by the army staffs (Nahaufklarungsstaffeln) and depended on the Luftwaffe's Air Liaison Officer (Fliegerverbindungsstaffeln or Flivo) for fighter or bomber support. However, Flivo units were responsible to the Luftwaffe, not the army, and their role was to keep air commanders informed of the situation through the use of radio-equipped vehicles. Loerzer was out of contact with Reichenau's command post for three days, while Richthofen was soon complaining to Löhr about the former's ignorance. Because he was impetuous and wanted to be in the thick of the action, Richthofen began flying around over the frontline in a Fieseler Fi 156 Storch, as air-ground liaison collapsed. His claims were not always believed, and these personal operations were a waste of time and needlessly exposed him to danger. Indeed, Major Spielvogel was shot down over Warsaw in his Storch on 9 September, and killed. While the operational situation was not good, Löhr took command of Fliegerführer z.b.V., giving the unit virtual autonomy and allowing Richthofen to build a personal empire of six Gruppen (Groups).

By 11 September, the fuel situation was acute, and logistics failed. On the first day his units were flying three missions every day, now it was reduced to one per day. Despite the problems, by 8 September Richthofen was preparing an assault on Warsaw. The raids had barely begun when a major threat developed behind him. A Polish counter offensive engaged the German Eighth Army, in an attempt to reach the Vistula river. Richthofen joined the assault and counterattack from the air. For three days the Germans bombed Polish forces contributing to the success in the Battle of Radom and Battle of the Bzura. Richthofen sent his air units up under orders to spend only ten minutes over the battlefield, and to expend all ammunition. Polish forces sought refuge in the forests nearby but were smoked out by incendiaries. Richthofen's men flew 750 sorties and dropped 388 tons of bombs. The air action destroyed remaining resistance, allowing the army to defeat the remaining Polish forces.

The remaining threat from Polish forces generated calls for attacks on Warsaw. Air attacks against the city had been planned for the first day, codenamed Wasserkante ("Seaside"). Just after midnight on 12/13 September, the Luftwaffe chief of staff Hans Jeschonnek ordered Löhr to prepare to attack ghettos in northern Warsaw, in retaliation for unspecified war crimes against German soldiers in recent battles. Richthofen's airmen flew 183 to 197 sorties, dropping equal quantities of high explosives and incendiaries. Some bombs fell close to German forces conducting the Siege of Warsaw and smoke made it impossible to assess damage. Richthofen confronted Hermann Göring over the need for a united air command for the Warsaw campaign and hinted he was the man for the job. He did not get his way until 21 September. Weather delayed the attack, which began on 22 September. That morning, Richthofen signaled the OKL; "Urgently request exploitation of last opportunity for large experiment as devastation and terror raid", and added "every effort will be made to completely eradicate Warsaw." The OKL rejected the proposal. Leaflets demanding the city's surrender had been dropped on four days earlier, but Richthofen began acting on his own initiative, using Luftwaffe Directive 18, dated 21 September, which gave him responsibility for the conduct of air operations.

Richthofen did not get the aircraft he wanted for the operation, in particular the Heinkel He 111, and instead was handed old Junkers Ju 52 transports which delivered bombs by airmen throwing them out of the doors. His Ju 87s were also banned from using bomb loads greater than 50 kg. On 22 September, Richthofen's command flew 620 sorties. German air units dropped 560 tonnes of high explosive and 72 tonnes of incendiaries. The bombing did great damage, causing 40,000 casualties and destroying one in ten of the buildings in the city, while only two Ju 87s and one Ju 52 were lost.

The army complained of near friendly fire incidents while fighting through the city and smoke made life difficult for the German artillery spotters. Hitler, despite the complaints, ordered the bombing to continue. Richthofen's force also flew 450 sorties against Modlin Fortress, securing the town's surrender on 27 September after 318 tonnes of bombs had been dropped on it in two days. Warsaw surrendered soon afterwards, and the campaign was declared over after the Polish surrender on 6 October 1939.

=== Phoney War ===
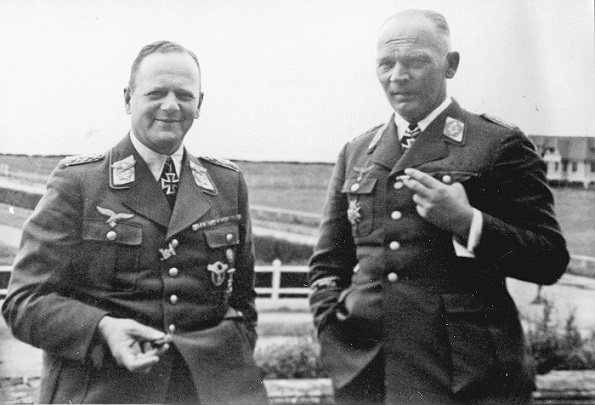
Richthofen with field marshal Erhard Milch in 1940

The invasion of Poland prompted both the United Kingdom and France to declare war on Germany. Originally, Richthofen's force had retained its original name, Fliegerfuhrer zbV, after its transfer from Poland, but on 1 October it was renamed Fliegerdivision 8 (Flying Division 8), and some days later it was given Corps status. Richthofen was given command of the unit, now a specialist ground-attack Corps, VIII. Fliegerkorps (8th Flying Corps). Most of the Geschwader involved were based at Cologne and Düsseldorf. Included in the order of battle was Jagdgeschwader 27 (JG 27), equipped with Messerschmitt Bf 109s; KG 77, equipped with Dornier Do 17s; Sturzkampfgeschwader 2 (StG 2) and StG 77, equipped with Ju 87 Stukas; and LG 2, equipped with Ju 87s, Bf 109s, Ju 88s and He 111s. The Corps was a purpose-built ground attack organisation. By 10 May, the order of battle had changed. Only one gruppe (group) of LG 2 remained, III.(Schlacht). IV.(St)./Lehrgeschwader 1 (LG 1), with Ju 87s were added, as was I.Sturzkampfgeschwader 76 (StG 76).

The task of Richthofen varied. He was to support Reichenau's German Sixth Army in Belgium and Paul Ludwig Ewald von Kleist's XXXXI and XIX Corps. During the Phoney War period, he established his headquarters at Koblenz on 18 October 1939, and thereafter his Corps steadily rose in strength, from 46 Staffeln (Squadrons), 27 of them Ju 87 units, to 59 by the end of the month. In December, he was first assigned to support Reichenau. Attacks on enemy air bases were only to be carried out if Allied air power attempted to interdict the German ground forces. Ground support was the first priority. This was reflected in Fliegerkorps VIII order of battle which contained six Ju 87 Gruppen (Groups, of 30 aircraft). Fliegerkorps V had the primary counter-air role and was positioned close to the front to provide air superiority support. When a breakthrough took place, it was ordered to exchange airfields with Fliegerkorps VIII, to allow for effective air support to the army. However, the Corps' war diary and Richthofen's personal diary make no mention of this order, which may indicate a breakdown in staff work at some level.

Operationally, the air division and corps headquarters were placed alongside, and moved with, army equivalents. The air liaison teams attached to the corps and Panzer Divisions were directed to report the battle situation at the front, but were forbidden to advise the army, or request air support. The army sent separate reports, under the same conditions. The reports were digested by Kleist and Richthofen's chiefs of staff, and action was or was not taken with mutual agreement. Attack orders could be delivered in minutes to air units. A Gruppe (Group) of Ju 87s and Bf 109s was ready in reserve to respond, and could do so within 45 to 70 minutes. Fliegerkorps VIII and Richthofen were led to believe they would spend the entire campaign supporting Reichenau in northern Belgium, but the OKL did not inform the Corps that it was going to be used in a Meuse breakthrough.

Richthofen knew Reichenau, and they had a close working relationship. During the planning for the Sixth Army's operations, Reichenau seemed to display a lack of interest when the subject turned to the capture of the bridges at Maastricht, in the Netherlands, and Fort Eben-Emael in Belgium. The defeat and/or capture of these objectives were essential for the Sixth Army to advance into the Low Countries. So unenthusiastic was Reichenau about the suggested airborne operation by glider troops against the fort, that he refused to allow the diversion of any army artillery. Richthofen supplied a Flak battalion, Flakgruppe Aldinger, for the task of supporting them.

=== Battle of France and Low Countries ===
Richthofen found himself under pressure in other sectors on 10 May, the first day of the offensive. In the early phase of the Battle of the Netherlands, the Fallschirmjäger (paratrooper) forces had been tasked with capturing The Hague and the Dutch royal family. In the subsequent Battle for The Hague, German forces met heavy resistance. The Seventh Army advancing through Belgium and the Netherlands threatened German progress. Richthofen was ordered to throw in half of his force in the Hague battle and to attack the Scheldt estuary, near Antwerp, the Dutch border, to stop the French before they positioned themselves near the Moerdijk bridgehead. Despite thick cloud, German aircraft helped drive them back.

After the Dutch capitulation, Richthofen turned to support Reichenau in the Battle of Belgium. Richthofen provided close and interdiction support to the German Sixth Army, in particular, to the XVI Army Corps (Erich Hoepner). Twelve Ju 87s were lost; anti-aircraft fire accounted for six I./StG 76 machines. His support operations were usually 65 km (40 mi) ahead of the forward edge of the battlefield, with even reconnaissance aircraft pressed into service as bombers. Army units carried flares and Swastika flags to prevent friendly fire incidents. In the Battle of Hannut Richthofen's forces proved effective against French armour. He also supported the German divisions a day or so later, at the Battle of the Gembloux Gap.

For the cost of twelve aircraft (four of them Ju 87s), he helped to attack French communication and supply positions, and supported Reichenau as he reached the Dyle river. He had moved into the Netherlands, to a hotel near Maastricht. He had a basic room, with a bath that did not work. In the afternoon, he received an order to cease operations in Belgium and send all he had to support the XLI Corps (Georg-Hans Reinhardt) north of Sedan. Richthofen was incredulous, and he had to move his entire infrastructure 100 km (62 mi) to the south. The failure of the OKL to inform him that he was to support the breakthrough is difficult to explain. He later noted in his diary that it was a major oversight for the OKL not to have informed him of his expected role but his diary also suggests he relished the fog of war. His forces were split between support for the advance in Belgium, while most were moved south. During the winding down of operations in the north, his units helped the sth Army capture Liege in Belgium on 17 May.

The most notable actions of his Corps took place during the Battle of Sedan. By this time, Richthofen had moved into St. Trond-Liege in Belgium. The German air attacks on French positions included 360 by his medium bombers, although his Ju 87 units could only fly 90 owing to the difficulties he had moving his Corps around. On 14 May JG 27 helped defend the bridgehead from Allied air attacks. Allied bomber strength was severely reduced. During the battle Richthofen suffered a blow when one of his experienced officers, Günter Schwartzkopff, was killed.

After the German breakthrough at Sedan, Richthofen asked that Fliegerkorps VIII be allowed to support Kleist to the sea. Richthofen convinced Göring to help press for the Panzers to continue, while his air Corps provided an aerial flank. His Ju 87s broke up attacks on the flanks of Army Group A, most notably combining to repulse the French 4h Armoured Division (Charles de Gaulle) on 16 and 19 May, at the Battle of Montcornet and Crécy-sur-Serre that destroyed the French Ninth Army. Excellent ground-to-air communications were maintained throughout the campaign. Radio equipped forward liaison officers could call upon the Stukas and direct them to attack enemy positions along the axis of advance. In some cases the Luftwaffe responded to requests in 10–20 minutes. Oberstleutnant Hans Seidemann (Richthofen's Chief of Staff) said that "never again was such a smoothly functioning system for discussing and planning joint operations achieved".

Richthofen moved his HQ to Ochamps to keep up with events, while he gambled on German air superiority holding out to fill forward airfields up with aircraft, which led to overcrowding. He also had communication difficulties, and flew around in his Storch to organise air support for the army. Hugo Sperrle, chief of Luftflotte 3 (Air Fleet Three) arrived at the same HQ, disrupting staff work and leading Richthofen to explode with rage. The pressures compelled him to risk being shot down to pass on orders, and while flying on 22 May he was forced to land owing to a fractured fuel tank. He organised support for Reinhardt and covered Heinz Guderian's Corps. While he complained about communication, by the standards of the day, it was efficient. The radio-equipped forward liaison officers assigned to Fliegerkorps VIII new targets, while leaving less important orders to land line officers. The Ju 87s were on 20-minute alert, and within 45 to 75 minutes they were diving onto their targets. In some cases, they were able to respond in 10 minutes. By 21 May, with his fighters based at Charleville-Mézières, Ju 87s at Sint-Truiden, and his Do 17s back in Germany, Richthofen's logistics were overstretched and his fuel was running out.

By 21 May the Allied armies were encircled and counter-attacks had been repulsed at the Battle of Arras. The Allies were evacuating from Dunkirk. During the Battle of Dunkirk and Siege of Calais, Richthofen supported the advance of Army Groups A and B in these operations. Aircraft from his command frequently met Royal Air Force (RAF) fighters that had flown across the Channel. Richthofen noted that RAF Fighter Command and 11 Group in particular were responsible for 25 per cent of German losses. Richthofen helped capture Calais, and was awarded the Knight's Cross of the Iron Cross on 23 May. Richthofen was ordered to support the 4th Army, though he showed little interest in the Dunkirk battles. He regarded them as a waste of time that disrupted preparations against southern France (Case Red). He believed the attempt to destroy Allied forces, or use of the Luftwaffe to prevent the evacuation, was unrealistic. Over Dunkirk, losses were severe and progress slow. On 26 May, Richthofen made a special effort to gain and hold air superiority. German air power failed to prevent the evacuation.

After the expulsion of the British Army and the surrenders of the Dutch and Belgians, Richthofen was ordered to support the German 9th Army, which included Guderian's Corps. The battles were swift, the French lost their most capable formations in the encirclement, and they capitulated on 22 June 1940, after the capture of Paris on 14 June and the encirclement of the Maginot Line on 15 June.

=== Battle of Britain ===
After the French capitulation, Richthofen continued to command VIII. Fliegerkorps during the Battle of Britain. The British refusal to reach a compromise with Germany forced the OKL to prepare a plan for attaining air superiority, codenamed Operation Eagle Attack. If this had been successful, the Wehrmacht might have launched an invasion of Britain, codenamed Operation Sea Lion.

For the first time, the Luftwaffe was engaged in an offensive air war without the support of the German Army. Despite Richthofen's Corps being primarily a specialist ground assault organisation, which supported ground forces, he was expected to help lead the assault over Britain. His Stuka units were the best precision attack aircraft in the Luftwaffe, and their 500 kg bombs were capable of sinking merchant shipping and/or seriously damaging warships. In June 1940, Richthofen and his Corps' specific mission was to establish air superiority over the southern part of the English Channel (near France) and to clear British shipping from that strip of sea altogether, particularly from the region between Portsmouth and Portland. Fliegerkorps VIII had a particular advantage: British fighters did not have enough radar warning and were operating at the limits of their range. This gave his Ju 87s a near-free hand in operations.

In July 1940, skirmishes took place, between Albert Kesselring's Luftflotte 2 and Hugo Sperrle's Luftflotte 3 on one side, and RAF Air Vice Marshal Keith Park's No. 11 Group RAF of Fighter Command on the other. The initial battles revolved around the British southern coast. Attempts by German air fleets to interdict British shipping in the English Channel were met with a significant response from the RAF, and many air battles ensued over the Channel. The Germans referred to these as Kanalkampf ("the Channel battles"). Richthofen made use of his Do 17P reconnaissance aircraft to locate convoys. When a convoy was located, he usually dispatched a Gruppe (30 aircraft) to engage the convoy, holding other Stuka Gruppen back for repeat attacks. The campaign was complicated by the weather, which grounded the Corps for long periods, and while the Ju 87s proved effective, they proved vulnerable to RAF fighters. On 17 July 1940, Richthofen was promoted to the rank of General der Flieger in recognition of his service.

Operations over the Channel were successful. Although Richthofen's force severely over-claimed the number of ships sunk, they did succeed in forcing the Royal Navy to suspend convoys through the Channel temporarily, as well as forcing it to abandon Dover as a base. On 8 August 1940, during one of the last operations against shipping, his airmen claimed 48,500 tons of shipping sunk in one operation. The actual number was just 3,581 tons.

In mid-August, the Luftwaffe was ready to begin the main assault over the British mainland. The campaign opened on 13 August 1940, christened Adlertag (Eagle Day) by Hermann Göring. The entire day met with repeated German failures in communication, intelligence, and coordination. The objective of the raids, Fighter Command's airfields, remained unscathed. Cloudy skies were largely responsible for the failure of the raids.

On 18 August, a large group of air battles led the day to be called "The Hardest Day". On that day, Richthofen sent his units against airfields in southern England. Faulty intelligence meant all those hit by his units were unimportant. StG 77 struck at Fleet Air Arm bases, which had little to do with Fighter Command. In the process, the Geschwader took heavy losses.

Richthofen was not so much shocked by total Ju 87 losses, which were running at a bearable 15 per cent, assuming the raids were getting results and the battle short, but he was alarmed at the near destruction of an entire Gruppe, a loss rate which ran at 50 per cent. It required a rethink of the aircraft types to be used in the campaign. The Battle of Britain amounted to a defeat for the Ju 87. The Ju 87s were removed from the battle, and were limited to small-scale attacks on shipping until the spring, 1941, by which time the Battle of Britain was over and the air war over Britain (The Blitz) was winding down. Richthofen's force flew 100 sorties in October, compared to the 100 per day in July 1940. In December 1940, Fliegerkorps VIII ended its Ju 87 operations and entered intensive winter training to be ready for the resumption of operations in the spring.

=== Balkans Campaign ===
In April 1941 VIII. Fliegerkorps was tasked with supporting the German Army in the invasion of Yugoslavia, the Battle of Greece and the Battle of Crete. The failure of the Royal Italian Army in the Greco-Italian War forced Hitler to intervene to secure the Axis flank, close to the Romanian oilfields. Operation Marita was expanded to involve the invasion of Greece and Yugoslavia.

Richthofen moved his units into Bulgaria via Romania. He found the country primitive, and resolved to improve the infrastructure, particularly communications, for the invasion of Yugoslavia. He intended to operate 120 aircraft from Bulgarian airfields and moved them into place on 1 March. While preparations were taking place he indulged in hunting and horse riding expeditions as a guest of the Bulgarian royal family. With Boris III of Bulgaria, he discussed dive-bombing techniques and the Corps' new aircraft, such as the Junkers Ju 88.

Richthofen's Corps was given two wings of Ju 87s for the task; StG 2 and Sturzkampfgeschwader 3 (StG 3), based in Bulgaria. With reinforcements, the German air contingent, under Luftflotte 4, would have a total of 946 combat aircraft supported by hundreds of transport machines. This force outnumbered the Greek, Yugoslav and RAF forces combined. Richthofen arranged to have the German Twelfth Army's air reconnaissance units cooperate with his own formations through the use of a liaison. The Corps' operations supported the German Twelfth Army in southern Yugoslavia, which cut the Yugoslav Army off from Greece and the Allied forces there. The victory in Yugoslavia was complete with the bombing of Belgrade, which facilitated a rapid victory by destroying command and control centres.

Richthofen's force did not participate in the bombing of Belgrade, but were engaged in attacking Yugoslav reinforcements, concentrated on the Austrian and Hungarian borders in the north, that were streaming south to block the break through. Mass columns of Yugoslav forces were caught in the open and decimated. The bombing of the capital disabled the command and control function of the Yugoslav Army, but it also convinced those in the government that further resistance would meet with even more destruction. Yugoslavia surrendered on 17 April.

Operations shifted to Greece. The Axis success in the Battle of the Metaxas Line allowed them to outflank the main Greek Army position and encircle the most effective Greek force. Richthofen's units supported the attack against the Line, without much interference from Allied air forces. Just 99 RAF aircraft (74 bombers) and 150 Greek aircraft opposed Richthofen's 500. By 15 April, the RAF had withdrawn. From this date, Fliegerkorps VIII's main targets were Allied ships cramming the evacuation ports. Unlike the gross over claiming against British shipping in the English Channel in 1940, the claims of 280,000 tons of shipping (60 vessels) destroyed up until 30 April 1941 were approximately correct.

Allied forces withdrew down the east coast of Greece, where the Royal Navy and Greek Navy began evacuating them from ports around southern Greece, including the capital, Athens. Ju 87 units from Richthofen's Corps inflicted high losses on shipping, eliminating the small Greek Navy and causing damage to British shipping. In two days, the Greek Naval base at Piraeus lost 23 vessels to Stuka attack. From 21 to 24 April 43 ships were sunk on the southern coast. Total Allied shipping losses amounted to 360,000 tons.

The end of the campaign on the mainland meant the sole remaining objective was the island of Crete, which lay off Greece's southern coastline. During the Battle of Crete Richthofen's Ju 87s also played a significant role. The operation came close to disaster on the first day. Most of the airborne forces that landed by glider or parachute lost most of their radios, which meant Richthofen had to rely on aerial reconnaissance aircraft. The German parachute troops were pinned down on the island, on the Cretan airfields they were supposed to capture. The level of effort Richthofen directed at relieving the pressure on them quite possibly saved the German units from destruction.

On 21–22 May 1941, the Germans attempted to send in reinforcements to Crete by sea, but lost 10 vessels to "Force D" under the command of Rear-Admiral Irvine Glennie. The force consisting of the cruisers HMS Dido, Orion and Ajax forced the remaining German ships to retreat. The Stukas were called upon to deal with the British Naval threat. On 21 May, the destroyer HMS Juno was sunk, and the next day, the battleship HMS Warspite was damaged and the cruiser HMS Gloucester was sunk with the loss of 45 officers and 648 ratings. The Ju 87s also crippled the cruiser HMS Fiji that morning, while sinking the destroyer HMS Greyhound with a single hit. As the Battle of Crete drew to a close the Allies began yet another withdrawal. On 23 May the Royal Navy also lost the destroyers HMS Kashmir and Kelly sunk followed by HMS Hereward on 26 May; Orion and Dido were also severely damaged. Orion had been evacuating 1,100 soldiers to North Africa and lost 260 of them killed and another 280 wounded during the attacks. Around eight British destroyers and four cruisers were sunk (not all by air attack), along with five destroyers of the Greek Navy.

=== Eastern Front ===
==== Operation Barbarossa ====
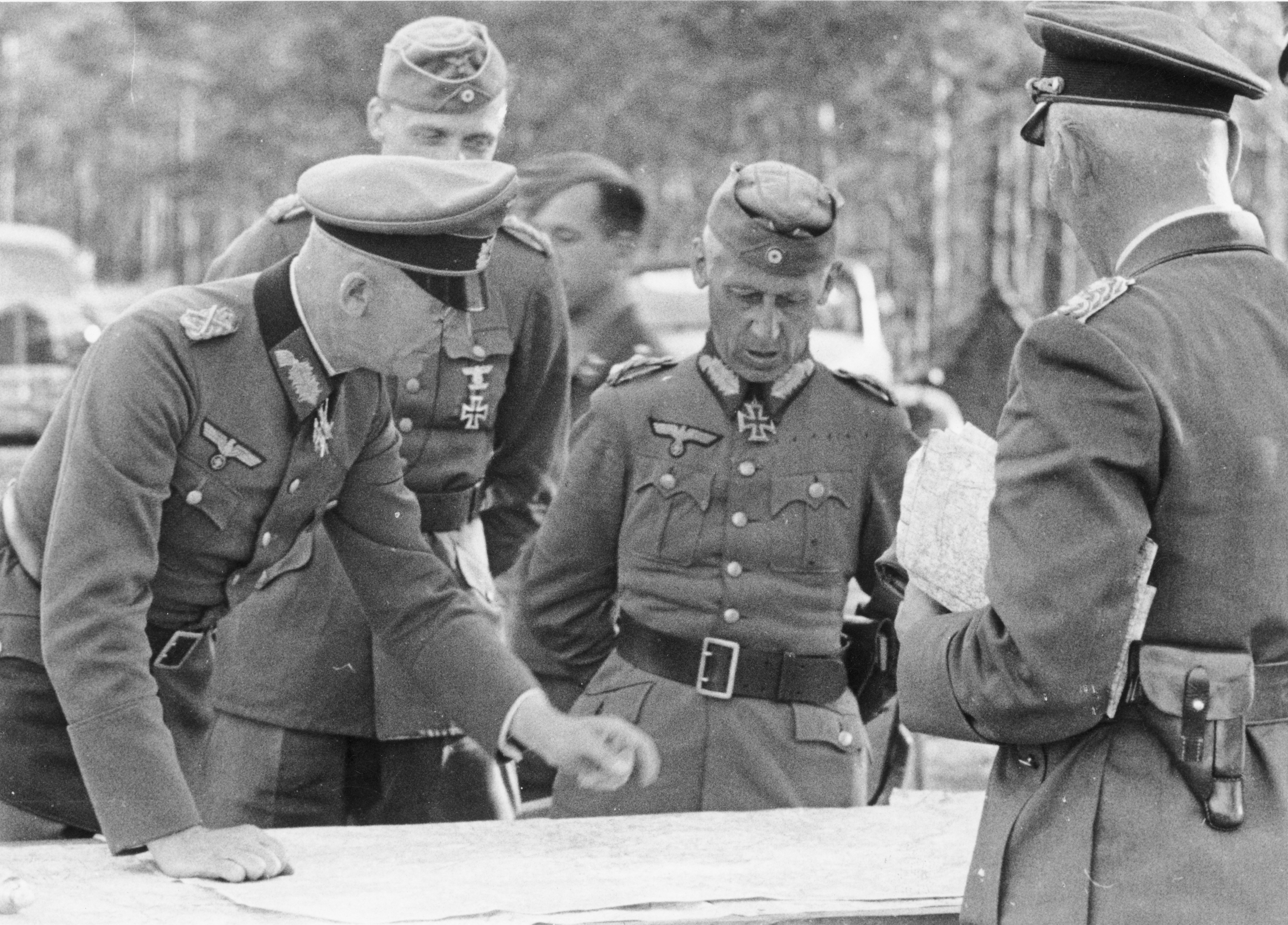
Fedor von Bock (left), Hermann Hoth (center), Walther von Hünersdorff (back side), and Richthofen (right, back turned), 8 July 1941. This photo was taken during the battles of Smolensk.

On 22 June 1941 the Wehrmacht launched Operation Barbarossa, the invasion of the Soviet Union. Richthofen continued his command of Fliegerkorps VIII which contained JG 27, StG 2, StG 3, 10./LG 2, and II.(S)./LG 2. Added to this force was II./Jagdgeschwader 52 (JG 52), I./Kampfgeschwader 2 (KG 2), III./Kampfgeschwader 3 (KG 3) and Zerstörergeschwader 26 (ZG 26). Initially his force supported Army Group Centre, under the command of Kesselring's Luftflotte 2.

The Flivos that Richthofen had championed in 1939 became a uniform facility throughout the Luftwaffe. Each Panzer and Motorised division now had air liaison officers attached to them to allow for effective air support. The experiments in France and the low countries had paid off. By the summer of 1941, the Luftwaffe and its land-air liaison teams would dramatically reduce the number of friendly-fire incidents, as German assault aviation would have detailed knowledge of friendly and enemy dispositions. It would not be until the beginning of 1943 that the Western Allies began adopting the same methods. In the opening phase of Barbarossa, Richthofen's units were able to perform well. The response time for air support usually did not exceed two hours.

In the opening rounds, Richthofen was involved in large pre-emptive strikes against the Red Air Force (Voyenno-vozdushnyye sily, or VVS) airfields. The Luftwaffe lost 78 aircraft on 22 June, but destroyed 1,489 aircraft on the ground, though further research indicates the number exceeded 2,000 destroyed. In July, waves of unescorted Soviet bombers tried in vain to halt the German advance, only to suffer extremely high losses. Within three days, the close support units of Kesselring's Luftflotte 2, including Richthofen's Corps, were able to revert to close support and interdiction operations largely unhindered.

On 23 June, his Corps decimated the Soviet 6th Cavalry Corps (Western Front) when they attempted a counterattack near Grodno. Richthofen threw all available aircraft at the thrust and played a vital role in its defeat. The Soviet Corps suffered 50 per cent casualties, mostly from air attack. Richthofen's Corps claimed 30 tanks, and 50 motor vehicles in 500 sorties. Army Group Centre continued to advance, reaching Vitebsk. Fliegerkorps VIII supported the army in the Battle of Smolensk only days later. In this phase he was also moved south, to support Panzer Group Guderian, which succeeded in supporting the capture of Orsha. The encirclement of Soviet forces at Smolensk was complete on 17 July 1941. Three weeks later, the last Soviet forces in the pocket were eliminated. Fliegerkorps VIII's achievements were important in defeating Soviet counterattacks and attempted breakouts. Richthofen was awarded the Oak Leaves to his Knight's Cross for an impressive performance. Results from the battles, and in particular the defeat of Soviet counterattacks by the Soviet 13th and 24th Armies, were impressive. Richthofen's forces were credited with disrupting reinforcements and destroying 40 motor vehicles on 24 July alone.

However, logistically, the Germans were starting to suffer serious problems in supplying their frontline just four weeks into the campaign. Richthofen lamented, "the Germans are good at fighting but weak at logistics". While German production could make up for losses at the front, it took time to get aircraft to the sector. The common operating strength by late summer was 50 to 60 percent, including Fliegerkorps VIII. Between 19 July and 31 August, the Luftwaffe had lost 725 aircraft. Before the operations in the Soviet Union, scant attention had been given to logistical operations in the east, primarily because of German over-confidence.

The victories had been hard won, but growing Soviet resistance and increased counterattacks brought the Smolensk-Moscow front to a stalemate. Hitler wavered, and on 30 July ordered Army Group Centre to assume the strategic defensive. In Directive 34, he refocused the main effort of Barbarossa on Leningrad because of strong concentrations of enemy forces west of Moscow. To this end, Richthofen and his Fliegerkorps were assigned to Luftflotte 1 (Air Fleet 1). During July 1941, the Oberkommando der Wehrmacht (OKW, or German High Command) displayed a lack of coherent strategy. It shifted from pursuing one objective to the next. It first wanted to advance to Moscow, then Leningrad, before shifting operations further south.

==== Leningrad ====
Richthofen took almost all of his units to support Army Group North. In heavy combat, working with Fliegerkorps I, Richthofen's fleet flew 1,126 sorties on 10 August, supporting the German army's advance on Narva. They claimed 10 tanks, more than 200 motor vehicles, and 15 artillery batteries. Further support was rendered to the German Sixteenth Army at Novgorod near Lake Ilmen. Experienced crews from Richthofen's Corps attacked railways near Leningrad to disrupt reinforcements. Fliegerkorps VIII's airmen noted Soviet resistance was far harder in the Lake Ilmen area than they had previously experienced. On 15 August, a major effort destroyed the main Soviet supply bridge over the Volkhov River. The fortress of Novgorod was destroyed by Richthofen's Ju 87s, and was abandoned. The city fell on 16 August. Just 24 hours later, a major Soviet counter offensive by the Soviet Northwestern Front attempted to recapture the city. Richthofen, in conjunction with Fliegerkorps I, almost completely destroyed the attackers near Staraya Russa.

The German Eighteenth Army and the Sixteenth Army overran the remaining parts of Estonia, seizing Chudovo, north of Novgorod, which severed one of the two main supply lines from Leningrad to Moscow. In support of these operations, Richthofen's Corps dropped 3,351 tons of bombs in 5,042 attacks from 10 to 20 August 1941. Wilhelm Ritter von Leeb, the commander-in-chief of Army Group North, was shocked by the ferocity of Richtofen's bombing operations, describing him as "merciless". On 20 August Richthofen moved strike and fighter aircraft to Spasskaya Polist, 40 km north-east of Novgorod, to support an attack that would encircle Leningrad and cut it off from Murmansk. German XXXXI Panzer Corps sealed in Soviet forces in the Lake Ilmen-Luga-Novgorod sector. The Leningrad Front attempted to relieve them, and Richthofen was ordered to blunt its attack. The Soviets were supported by strong air units, and large air battles broke out. The Germans succeeded in maintaining their lines, and could now turn to capturing Leningrad.

Before a main assault could be launched, Leningrad needed to be completely cut off from the Soviet hinterland which led to the Siege of Leningrad. This was achieved by Fliegerkorps VIII, which supported the German Eighteenth Army in forcing the Soviet 54th Army from the shores of Lake Ladoga and Leningrad was isolated. Thereafter, Fliegerkorps VIII and Fliegerkorps I concentrated on 16 square kilometres of front over Leningrad, achieving numerical superiority. Richthofen's bombers participated in great efforts to destroy Leningrad from the air, some crews flying two missions per night. On 8 September, 6,327 incendiaries alone were dropped, causing 183 fires. The German Army advanced into the breaches created by the Luftwaffe. However, the Soviets stalled the German advance on 25 September by committing their last resources and reinforcing their 54th Army (later renamed the 48th Army). With the offensive stopped, Hitler returned Richthofen to Luftflotte 2. Operations had been expensive. In August Fliegerkorps VIII had lost 27 aircraft destroyed and 143 damaged.

==== Moscow offensive ====
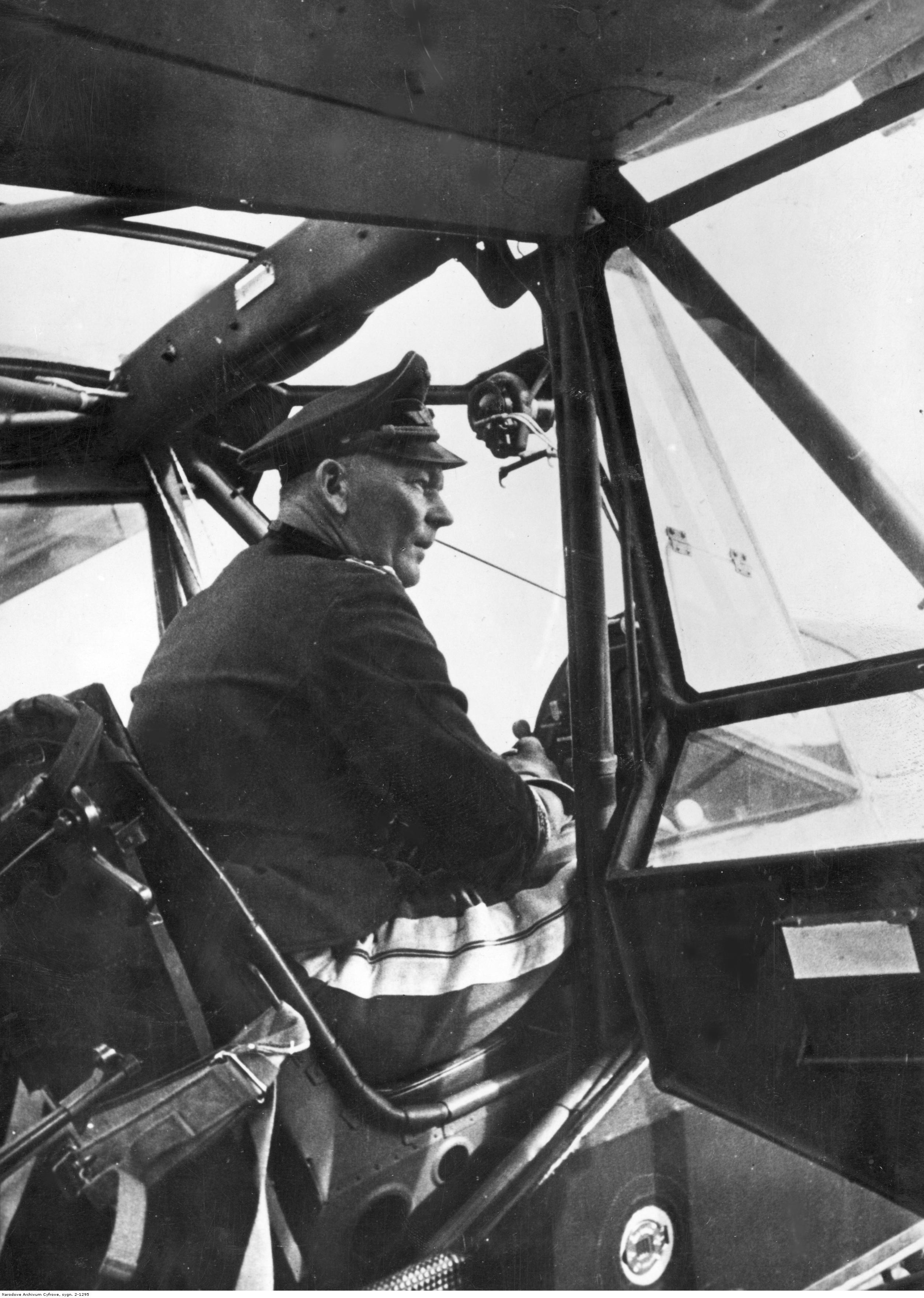
Richthofen seated in a Fi-156 liaison aircraft, October 1941

Frustrated in the north, Hitler turned to Moscow. On 2 October 1941 he enacted Operation Typhoon, an offensive aimed at capturing Moscow via a pincer movement. It achieved early success in enveloping considerable Soviet forces at Vyazma and Bryansk by 10 October. However, the initial success gave way to a grinding battle of attrition. By 11 November the situation in the air was also changing from a position of initial parity. Kesselring's Luftflotte 2 and the headquarters of Fliegerkorps I were moved to the Mediterranean Theatre. This left Richthofen's Fliegerkorps VIII in control of all Axis aviation supporting Army Group Centre against Moscow. The Soviet opposition was growing in number and quality. By 10 November, 1,138 aircraft (738 serviceable) including 658 fighters (497 serviceable) were defending Moscow. The weather slowed down operations until 15 November, when the mud and rain water froze and mobile operations became possible. Richthofen threw all available aircraft into the Battle for Moscow whenever conditions permitted. Fliegerkorps VIII flew 1,300 sorties from 15 to 24 November.

One last attempt to capture Moscow was made on 2 December, but lack of fuel and ammunition and increasingly stiff resistance prevented its success. By this time, the Soviet air forces had gained air superiority. By 5 December, when the counteroffensive drove Army Group Centre back, they could muster 1,376 aircraft against just 600 German. The Germans possessed just 487 fighters (200 serviceable) on the entire Eastern Front. There were 674 Soviet fighters (480 serviceable) on the Moscow front. When the Soviet offensive began it quickly gained ground. German morale sank and Army Group Centre, overstretched and exhausted, was threatened with collapse. Richthofen's forces, despite enemy air superiority, did all they could to blunt the attack. The effectiveness and determination of German air units improved the morale of the army. Concentrating aviation against Soviet ground forces, the Luftwaffe delivered a series of attacks that took the wind out of the Soviet offensive within two weeks. Richthofen's forces bore the main burden of the air defence against the Soviet attack, and had been reinforced with four Kampfgruppen. Hitler had forbidden a retreat, and Richthofen endorsed this view. His refusal to give ground and his tenacity saw him become one of Hitler's favourites. Hitler gave him a further five transport groups to keep his Corps effective. Fliegerkorps VIII would stay on the front until April 1942, fighting against a series of Soviet counter offensives.

==== Move to the Crimea ====
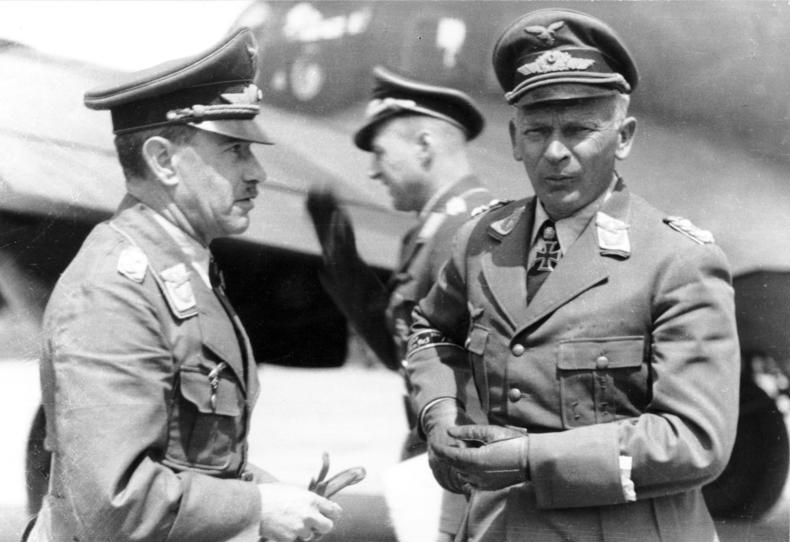
Alexander Löhr, c-in-c Luftflotte 4 (left) and Richthofen, in the spring or summer, 1942.

In the winter, 1941–1942, the stalemate on the north and central sectors was not mirrored in the south. Army Group South had overrun Ukraine, were outside Rostov, considered the gate to the Caucasus and its rich oil fields, and had occupied most of the Crimea. However, in December the Soviets made an amphibious landing at the Kerch Peninsula, on the extreme east coast of the Crimea. The landing threatened to cut off the German Eleventh Army commanded by Erich von Manstein, which were engaged in the siege of Sevastopol. On 31 March, Manstein laid down his plans and called his offensive Operation Trappenjagd ("Bustard Hunt"). On 17 April, he demanded massed close support aviation for his offensive. Manstein turned to Richthofen and Fliegerkorps VIII, which had returned to the front after resting and refitting in Germany. The Crimean base allowed the Black Sea Fleet to continue operating against Axis shipping, and it would also provide air bases for the VVS to attack the Romanian oil fields. Hitler supported Manstein and called for the greatest possible concentration of air power to support the operation.

Richthofen had arrived in Luneberg on 12 April, ready for a four-week period of leave. On 18 April he received a call from the Luftwaffe's Chief of the General Staff Hans Jeschonnek, who informed him he was to leave for Kerch immediately. He commented in his diary, "By order of the Führer, I must immediately leave again, to work at Kerch. Get there quickly and get everything started! Formal orders still to come." After meeting Hitler he wrote, "The Fuhrer insisted in a very respectful manner that I should take part at Kerch, because I'm the only person who can do the job." Hitler had a high opinion of Richthofen, and believed the Corps' record as a specialised close-support force was unparalleled and would guarantee success. Richthofen was arrogant, aggressive and harsh, but he was a driven, pro-active, successful and influential tactical air commander.

Richthofen's Corps had been resting in Germany, rebuilding after the winter battles. This was still in progress when Richthofen landed at Luftflotte 4's headquarters at Nikolayev on 21 April. The discussion that Richthofen had with Löhr, the air fleet's commander, was unique in Luftwaffe history. For the first time organisational custom, which was to place Corps level units under the command of an air fleet in whatever region the Corps was deployed, was abandoned. Richthofen was allowed to operate independently alongside Luftflotte 4. Fliegerkorps VIII was under his command at all times and would provide the lion's share of close support operations. All offensive air operations were Richthofen's responsibility, and he was only answerable to Hermann Göring. This news was not received well by Löhr or his chief of staff at Luftflotte 4, Günther Korten.

Richthofen met with Manstein on 28 April, and largely got on with Manstein. Despite being conceited personalities, they both genuinely respected each other. Though on one occasion Richthofen claimed in his diary to have taken great delight in beating Manstein in a debate over tactical differences. Manstein and Richthofen determined that the limited land forces available made cooperation between land and air forces critical. The main points of effort were discussed and each man's staff was ordered to deal directly with each other to facilitate rapid cooperation.

==== Kerch campaign ====
Richthofen flew in his small Storch aircraft around the front, often coming under enemy fire and occasionally force-landing. He urged his Corps to speed up preparations and openly criticised his superiors, including Löhr of Luftflotte 4, over what he considered to be "inferior" preparations. The difficulty in getting units out of Germany quickly, where they were refitting, prompted Richthofen, in consultation with Jeschonnek and Manstein, to ask for a postponement of the offensive for two days until they could be brought in. His request was granted, and the offensive was moved to 7 May 1942. When the reinforcements arrived, he had 11 bomber, three dive-bomber and seven fighter Gruppen at his disposal.

Richthofen's forces quickly established air superiority in the Battle of the Kerch Peninsula, destroying 82 enemy fighters within the first day. Richthofen arrived at his command post as the bombs first fell. He was impressed with the 2,100 sorties flown on 7 May. Inter service communication was facilitated by Fliegerverbindungsoffizier (air liaison officers or Flivos), specially trained air force officers attached to ground units. They advised the air Corps on the situation and intentions of the ground forces and also advised the army of the best use of air power. This operational style was effective against fixed targets in slow-moving operations, but was more difficult in fast-moving operations such as Bustard Hunt. The advance meant Richthofen had to keep moving forward. He complained bitterly about the inability of his signals teams to set up new telephone and radio communications quickly enough.

Operations were successful. The Corps flew 1,700 missions on 9 May, destroying 42 enemy aircraft for two losses. On 10 and 11 May, bad weather prevented large-scale operations, but on 12 May they flew 1,500 sorties. On this day, the Soviet line in the Crimea collapsed. Enjoying air supremacy, the Wehrmacht made large gains. Near the Sea of Azov, Soviet infantry, massed and unprotected, suffered heavy losses to Richthofen's units which were using cluster bombs. Richthofen was delighted at the "wonderful scene", stating, "we are inflicting the highest losses of blood and material". He described the destruction as "terrible! Corpse-strewn fields from earlier attacks....I have seen nothing like it so far in this war". He was so shocked, he felt compelled to show the Luftwaffe's signals officer, Wolfgang Martini, the carnage.

However, that same evening, Richhofen received bad news. He was ordered to send one fighter, one dive-bomber and two bomber Gruppen to help contain a Soviet breakthrough in the north, and the developing Second Battle of Kharkov. Richthofen complained in his diary, claiming success was now in question at Kerch. The statement was likely hyperbole. By this time the Soviets had collapsed in the Crimea, and were streaming back to the port of Kerch. Kerch fell on 15 May. Richthofen then complained he did not have the adequate forces to stop the Soviets evacuating by sea, but Axis aviation did inflict considerable attrition on Soviet units on the beaches and sank a number of vessels. German artillery and air attack brought the Dunkirk-style evacuation to an end on 17 May. Manstein praised Richthofen's support, describing his air operations as decisive in the Kerch victory. The Corps had flown between 1,000 and 2,000 missions per day before the Kharkov withdrawal, and 300 to 800 afterwards. It reduced Soviet air power in the region from 300 aircraft to 60 in 10 days. Other sources give a total of 3,800 sorties flown in support of Trappenjagd.

==== Crimea and Sevastopol ====
On 20 May, Richthofen met Manstein again to discuss preparations for overcoming the fortress port of Sevastopol. It was emphasised that the same level of air support offered at Kerch was needed. On 22 May, Richthofen had the chance to meet with Hitler, who once again flattered the Luftwaffe commander and his abilities, referring to him as "his specialist". The aim of the discussion as far as Richthofen was concerned, was to impress upon Hitler the importance of not diverting forces away from the front as had been done at Kerch. Hitler listened closely and agreed. Hitler and the Chief of the General Staff Hans Jeschonnek intended to promote Richthofen to command Luftflotte 4, while sending Alexander Löhr to the Balkans. Göring wanted Bruno Loerzer, his friend and commander of Fliegerkorps II to take the job, but Hitler wanted a hands-on commander. Jeschonnek agreed that the higher command of the air force was lousy, and needed a competent combat leader. On 25 May, Richthofen flew the six-hour flight back to Simferopol.

During the planning phase he ordered anti-shipping operations to cease in the region. Richthofen feared that the coming operations would mean friendly fire incidents against Axis shipping near Sevastopol. Admiral Götting and Fliegerführer Süd (Flying Leader South) Wolfgang von Wild, responsible for all naval aviation in the region, ignored the request; it was only necessary to abandon operations in the Crimean shipping lanes, not the whole expanse of the Black Sea.

Richthofen pooled his resources with Wild and Kurt Pflugbeil's Fliegerkorps IV. This gave the Luftwaffe some 600 aircraft to support Manstein. Richthofen scraped up all the forces he could for the assault, getting three dive-bomber, six medium bomber and three fighter Gruppen for the operation. He was not overly concerned with his fighter strength, as his fighters outnumbered the 60-odd aircraft of the Soviet air defence. He could begin close support operations immediately and did not have to wait to conduct time-wasting battles for air superiority. So confident was Richthofen that the VVS posed no threat, he lent his Flak forces to the army, though he retained operational control.

The stages of the air campaign were managed into three; attacking Soviet reserves beyond German artillery; raids against harbour facilities, airfields, fortresses and shipping; cooperating with German artillery to cancel out Soviet mortar and gun batteries. Richthofen acknowledged that not all of these components could be conducted simultaneously. He chose shattering the fortifications through relentless air bombardment as most important. To do this, Richthofen garnered most of the air units into supporting the land operations. His view of anti-shipping operations, and Wolfgang von Wild's conduct of them, was scathing. However, he did not take into account the systemic technical problems with German U-boat and aerial torpedoes which were unreliable, and blamed Wild and the air units instead for failing to achieve much success.

When the operation, Sturgeon Catch, began on 2 June 1942, Richthofen watched it all unfold. He watched the first waves of bombers hit Sevastopol from his own Storch, in company with his chief of staff. The air units of Fliegerkorps VIII were positioned close to the front. Richthofen's forces flew 723 sorties and dropped 525 tons of bombs. The bombs included the fortress busting 1,400, 1,700 and 1,800 kg bombs. Between 3 and 6 June, 2,355 missions showered 1,800 tons of bombs and 23,000 incendiaries. On 7 June 1,300 tons of bombs were dropped in 1,368 air attacks, and these were followed on 8 June by another 1,200 sorties. The mechanics were working around the clock in sweltering heat (up to 40C) to keep the aircraft operational. On 9 June 1,044 sorties and 954 tons of bombs were dropped, followed by 688 sorties and 634 tons the next day. Richthofen's logistics were stretched after a week of action. On 11 June another effort dropped 1,000 tons of bombs in 1,070 sorties. Richthofen noted that he now had only enough supplies for 36 hours of operations. He ordered only important and fewer targets attacked, ordering aircraft to attack in columns to reduce the wastage of bombs and keep the pressure up on the fortifications. It failed to solve the "bomb calamity", Richthofen noted on 14 June, and three days later he could only drop 800 of the planned 1,000 tons.

Richthofen's participation in the operation came to an abrupt end on 23 June 1942. Having been informed by Jeschonnek and Hitler that he was to assume command of Luftlfotte 4 after the fall of Sevastopol earlier, they decided not to wait. They ordered him to Kursk in order to take up his command, leaving his Corps behind, and Sevastopol air operations under the command of Wild. Richthofen was disgusted. He felt it was ridiculous to move him mid-operation, and he had wanted to be there when the fortress fell. He wrote, "It is a pity that one can never finish what one starts in the east. After a while, it takes away all the pleasure."

Without Richthofen, Fliegerkorps VIII continued to contribute to the successful but costly operation. The Corps flew 23,751 sorties and dropped 20,000 tons of bombs, losing just 31 aircraft. The Axis finally achieved victory on 4 July 1942, when the last defenders were routed. The Luftwaffe's close support arm reached a peak over Sevastopol. From then on, it would be dispersed over the Eastern Front.

==== Case Blue ====
On 28 June 1942 the Axis began their major summer offensive, Case Blue. Army Group South's objective was to advance towards the Stalingrad and Caucasus regions. Now commanding Luftflotte 4, Generaloberst Richthofen had one of the largest commands supporting the effort. The Luftwaffe concentrated its largest single force since Barbarossa. Of the 2,690 aircraft supporting Case Blue, 52 per cent (1,400) were under the command of Richthofen. A further 265 Romanian, Hungarian, Italian and Slovak aircraft were also present. Opposing them were 2,800 aircraft (900 in reserve) including 1,200 fighters of the southern VVS front. To the north, the Soviets had been convinced the main attack was to come against Moscow owing to the German deception plan Operation Kremlin.

The offensive opened on 28 June, and the Red Army put the German forces on the boundary of Army Groups Centre and South under severe pressure in the belief the main thrust to Moscow would emanate from that region. The battles of Voronezh cost the Soviets 783 aircraft by 24 July, but it meant Richthofen had to divert Fliegerkorps VIII, now under the command of Martin Fiebig, north to deal with the threats while Pflugbeil's Fliegerkorps IV covered the advance into the Caucasus. On 18 July Richthofen moved Luftflotte 4 and its headquarters to Mariupol on the Sea of Azov. On 2 August Richthofen created the Gefechtsverband Nord under the command of Alfred Bulowius. Within six weeks, Richthofen had lost 350 aircraft and objected to Hitler's directive splitting the two armies (Army Group A and B) to pursue the capture of Stalingrad and the Baku oilfields at the same time, as he now had to support two lines of logistics which he could ill-afford. Nevertheless, he committed himself to his task, and ordered Fiebig to destroy rail links around Stalingrad, where the German Sixth Army, despite having 1,000 aircraft supporting its drive to the city, were struggling to make rapid headway.

On 3 September, the Luftwaffe began its major effort against the city by beginning several destructive raids. The Battle of Stalingrad initiated a regression in air tactics back to the First World War, where a few flights of aircraft made pin-point attacks against enemy infantry and acted as an extension of the infantry. In October, the Romanian Air Corps (consisting of 180 aircraft) arrived and began attacking rail targets north east of Stalingrad, easing the air situation. Logistics were stretched and the front in Stalingrad formed into a stalemate, with the Germans having taken central and southern Stalingrad. With no reinforcements, and having lost 14 percent of his strength, Richthofen turned to support the German Army in the Caucasus. Göring ordered him to concentrate on Stalingrad, but Richthofen refused to return. This prompted a meeting between Hitler, Jeschnonnek and Göring on 15 October. Hitler was in a good mood, and he had taken personal command of Army Group A operations in the Caucasus on 9 September. He supported Richthofen and gave him the authority to continue, partly in the belief that the battle in Stalingrad was nearly over. Richthofen accused the army of "constipation" in Stalingrad on 22 September and was critical of its vacillation a month earlier.

This had not always been the case. Most of German aviation had been concentrated on the Stalingrad Front in August, on Hitler's orders. Pflugbeil's Fliegerkorps IV was over-stretched for over a month from 28 July. Richthofen had wanted to support Army Group A in the south, but despite the Caucasus oilfields being the primary target for German strategy, the Army Group received poor air support. Richthofen's arm-chair general tactics were important in deciding where air power was to be used, and would be done so only if he rated the army's chances of success. He allowed some raids against Grozny's oilfields and close support operations, but the mountain terrain in the region made it difficult for the Panzer Divisions to exploit the actions of his air units. In a fit of pique at the army's failures, Richthofen refused to provide support for the Caucasus front. This remained the situation until mid-October. For a few days, a concentrated effort was made in the Caucasus. Hitler's realisation that the oilfields at Baku could not be captured meant that he was forced to order the Luftwaffe to eliminate them. The operations had limited success.

In the winter, Richthofen was forced to reshuffle his units around to meet threats and offer support. By 7 November, he had helped the German Sixth Army eliminate nearly all of the Soviet forces in Stalingrad. But the effort created a supply crisis. The Luftwaffe's railheads were 100 kilometres west of Stalingrad, and regardless of the army's difficulties, his units got logistical priority. Richthofen recommended this be amended. The battle in Stalingrad had meant, in Richthofen's view, that air units could not be effective in close-quarter combat. Until this point, Richthofen had received 42,630 tons of supplies and 20,713 tons of fuel while the army received 9,492 tons of fuel. He rationed his own fuel stocks which allowed him to create a reserve but also increased, by air lift, the tonnage from 2,000 to 5,000 tons.

==== Defeat at Stalingrad ====
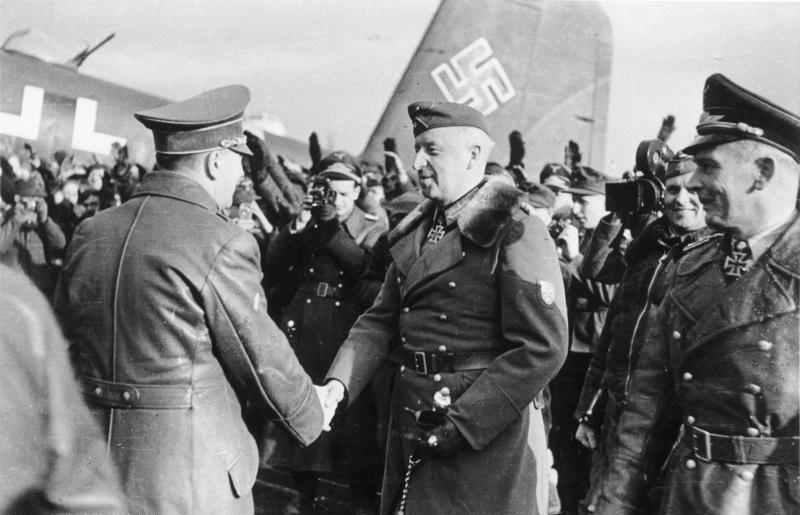
Erich von Manstein greeting Hitler in Army Group South's headquarters at Zaporozh'ye, Ukraine, in March 1943. On the right are Hans Baur and Richthofen.

On 19 November the Red Army began a counter offensive, named Operation Uranus. Within days, the Soviets had encircled some 300,000 German, Italian, Romanian and Hungarian soldiers in the city of Stalingrad. It was decided by Hitler and the OKL to supply the Axis forces by air. Richthofen was horrified. He telephoned Berchtesgaden and tried to get through to Hitler, but none of his aides would put him through. He tried to convince Göring that his air fleet did not have the resources to sustain an air lift, and that the best option would be to attempt a breakout before the Soviet forces entrenched. He flew to Manstein's headquarters, and the Field Marshal agreed a breakout must take place. With the Sixth Army preserved, the initiative could be regained later. He made this request to Hitler. The Soviet divisions were smaller than their German counterparts: but they had 97. Holding Stalingrad was now impossible.

In the event, Hitler chose to continue with the airlift, perhaps influenced by the Luftwaffe's success in the Demyansk Pocket. Luftflotte 4 failed to alter the situation. The best air lift operation took place on 7 December 1942, when 363.6 tons were flown in. However, the concentration of Soviet aviation disrupted the intended supply operations and German transport losses were heavy. Some 266 Junkers Ju 52s were destroyed, three-quarters of the fleet's strength on the Eastern Front. The He 111 gruppen lost 165 aircraft in transport operations. Other losses included 42 Junkers Ju 86s, nine Fw 200 Condors, five Heinkel He 177 bombers and a Junkers Ju 290. The Luftwaffe also lost close to 1,000 highly experienced bomber crew personnel. So heavy were the Luftwaffe's losses that four of Luftflotte 4's transport units (KGrzbV 700, KGrzbV 900, I./KGrzbV 1 and II./KGzbV 1) were "formally dissolved". In the air, the Luftwaffe had sustained its heaviest defeat since the Battle of Britain. The remnants of the German Sixth Army surrendered on 2 February 1943.

A complete disaster was averted by Army Group South, largely thanks to Richthofen's Luftflotte 4 and his former Fliegerkorps VIII, under his overall command. The loss of Stalingrad left Rostov-on-Don the only bottleneck supplying Army Group A in the Caucasus. In December 1942, Luftflotte 4 was still one of the most powerful single air commands in the world. On 15 January 1943, 1,140 of the 1,715 aircraft on the Eastern Front were under Richthofen's command. Its attacks on the Soviet Southwestern Front prevented the Soviets from achieving the goal of isolating the Army Group in the Caucasus. Its air operations proved decisive in this regard.

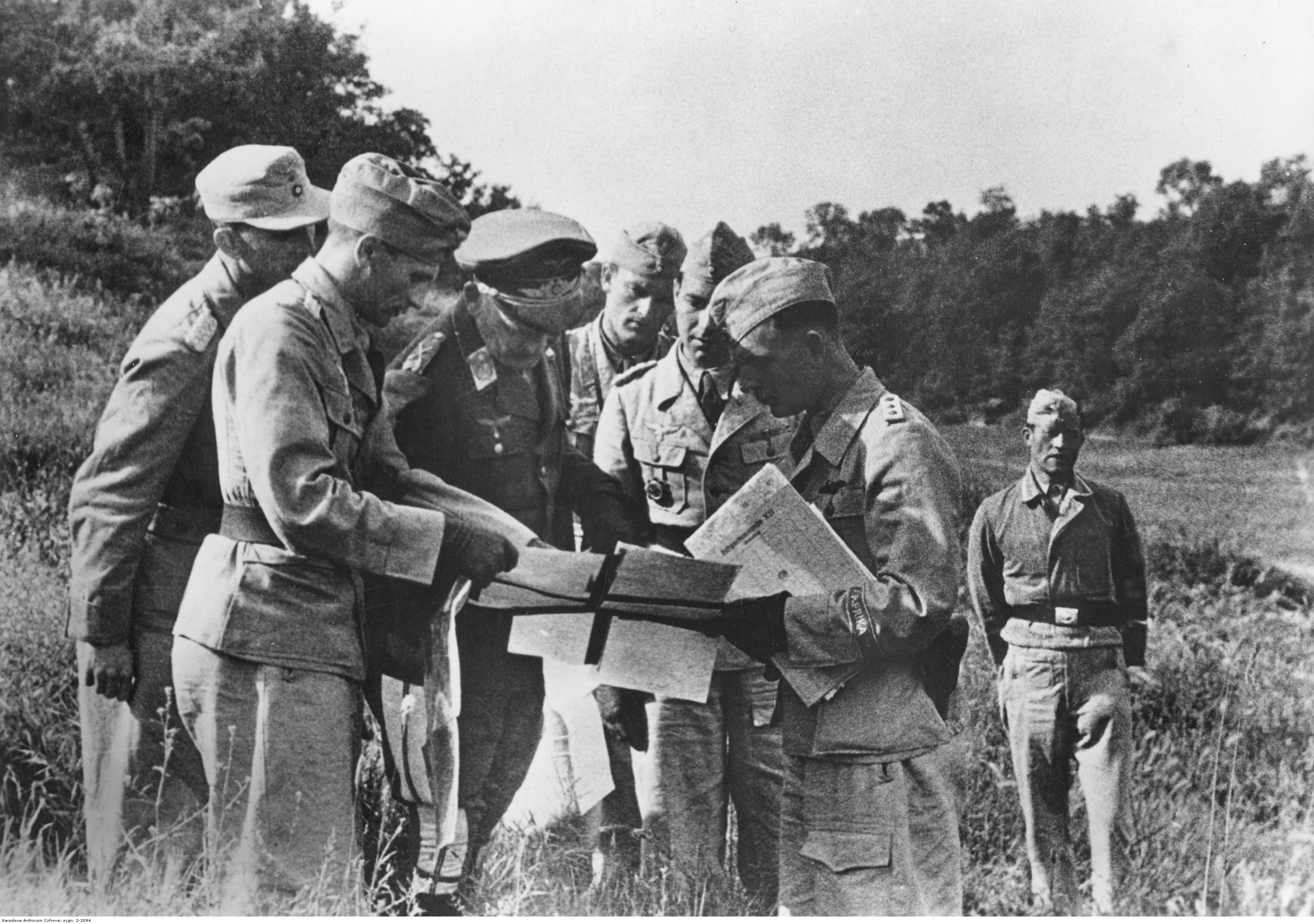
Richthofen studying maps on the Italian Front with other officers, May 1944. The officer on the right has the Afrikakorps armband.

Although defeated, Luftflotte 4 had flown 24,760 wounded and 5,150 technical personnel out of Stalingrad, which was 11 per cent of the total German manpower. It delivered only 19 per cent of the required supplies. It had four fewer transport groups than at Demyansk, so failed in its overall task despite Fiebig ordering his bombers onto transport operations. They managed an average of 68 sorties per day, delivering 111 tons of supplies against the requirement of 300 tons for the Sixth Army.

After the defeat, Richthofen travelled to see Hitler on 11 February. He first met with Göring and allayed Göring's fears that Richthofen would use the opportunity to criticise Göring's leadership in front of Hitler. Richthofen later did criticise Göring's reluctance to disagree with Hitler, and attacked his willingness to allow Hitler to receive what Richthofen considered to be faulty advice. When Richthofen did meet Hitler he was critical of him for micromanagement, though he soothed Hitler's ego by insisting he had been let down by advisors. Hitler apparently took all of this calmly, and admitted that he bore the ultimate responsibility for the air lift fiasco. Richthofen argued that commanders needed more tactical and operational freedom, and won Hitler's agreement – though subsequent operations showed Hitler's remarks were insincere. Richthofen avoided a confrontation because Hitler liked him and believed him to be loyal. Four days later Richthofen was promoted to the rank of field marshal, being the youngest officer besides Göring to reach this rank in the Wehrmacht.

=== Later command ===
The frontline threatened to collapse altogether in the east, but the Red Army had not yet learned the full lessons of manoeuvre warfare. At Stalin's behest, it attempted to cut off the Axis forces in the Caucasus by advancing to Rostov, using Kharkov and Belgorod as a springboard. This strained the logistics of Soviet forces, and presented an ideal chance for Manstein to counterattack. Radio intercepts suggested that the Soviets were low on fuel, both for their ground forces and the VVS, giving more urgency for a counter strike. It would lead to the Third Battle of Kharkov, where Manstein would win a major victory.

To support his attack Richthofen sent eight of his weakest Gruppen home to rest and refit, which allowed the machines left to be redistributed among stronger units. With congestion eased the infrastructure could cope with serviceability, which improved dramatically. The Luftwaffe was also now back near to pre-prepared air bases, near logistical railheads at Mykolaiv and Poltava, which enabled accelerated rates of re-equipment. After allowing his forces to re-equip near Rostov, he moved his units on 18 February. Richthofen moved his forces closer to the front. Fliegerkorps I, now under Günther Korten, was moved from Boryspil, near Kiev, to Poltava. Fliegerkorps IV under Fiebig was moved to the Kuban, and Fliegerkorps V under Pflugbeil was moved to Dnepropetrovsk in the centre of the German offensive thrust. These forces were to support the First Panzer Army and the Fourth Panzer Army. Korten began his support for the Fourth Panzer Army on 19 February 1943. By 21 February 1,145 sorties had been flown, and another 1,486 were flown the following day. The Luftwaffe flew a daily average of 1,000 sorties with total air superiority, owing to the absence of the VVS. Manstein encircled and destroyed a large number of enemy forces, stabilising the front, but leaving a bulge in the east, around the city of Kursk.

Throughout the spring and early summer of 1943, Richthofen began preparing his air fleet for Operation Citadel and the Battle of Kursk, the major summer campaign which was supposed to repeat the Kharkov victory on a larger scale and turn the tide in the east back in the Axis' favour. Richthofen did not take part.

The Third Battle of Kharkov proved to be his last battle on the Eastern Front, and he was transferred to the Mediterranean, where he would command Luftwaffe forces in the Italian Campaign. One of Richthofen’s major problems in Italy had been the weakness of the Italian air force. Although he had little faith in Italian fascist command, he recognized Italy's great industrial potential to produce high-quality aircraft. Richthofen would recommended that the Luftwaffe adopt Italian-designed and produced aircraft, in particular the Fiat G 55 fighter which had great performance. His recommendations were mostly ignored by Luftwaffe high command. After the situation at Salerno stabilised, he put forward an ambitious set of plans to quickly build up a large air force for Mussolini's new Italian Social Republic. He asked for personnel and aircraft from the Reichs Air Ministry to set up a pilot schools for Italian recruits, which would consist of many trained personnel of the old regime. He further proposed that the Germans treat the Italians as partners rather than subordinates. These plans gained Göring's approval, but Hitler summarily turned them down with the comment that he did not want to hear about rearming the Italians.

By early 1944, with few aircraft at his disposal, the Luftwaffe in Italy became primarily a flak organization. The aviation force that Richthofen commanded in Italy as a field marshal was smaller than the air forces he commanded as a major general in Poland. In January 1944 the Allied landings at Anzio caught Richthofen by surprise. The Allied invasion forces had formulated an effective strategy on how to deal with the threat of the Luftwaffe in Italy. With the help of Ultra intelligence, German airfields were attacked so frequently and effectively that Luftwaffe units never recovered from their losses. Attrition was constant and far worse than on the eastern front. The failure of the German ground and air offensive against Anzio in April 1944, meant that the Allies would establish a firm beachhead, and there was no opportunity for Richthofen to launch any major counteroffensives in Italy.

=== Death ===
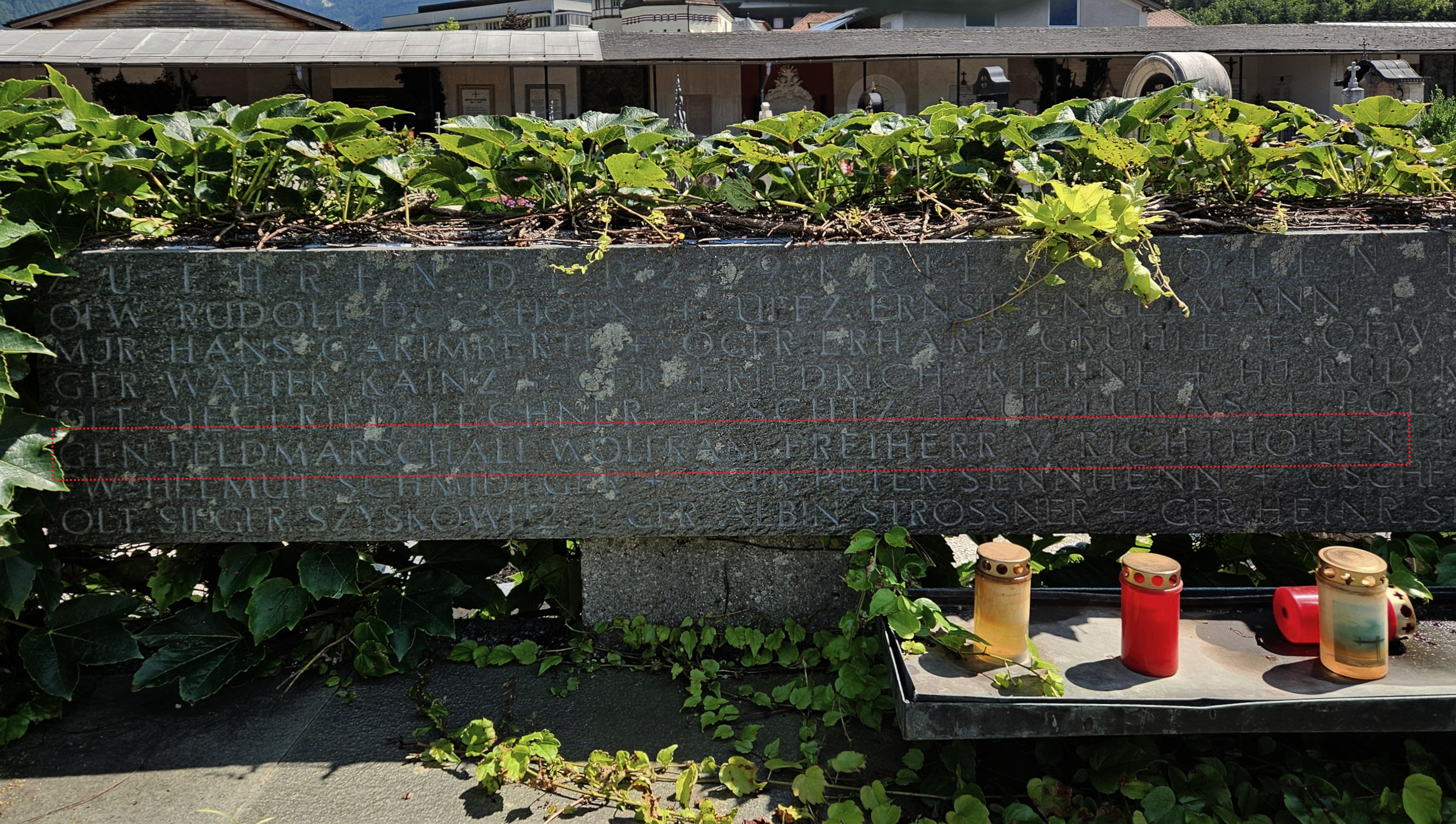
Bad Ischl cemetery, naming Wolfram von Richthofen among the names of the people buried in war graves at the time

Throughout 1944 Richthofen suffered from headaches and exhaustion. In October it was discovered he was suffering from a brain tumour. He was sent on medical leave to the Luftwaffe hospital for neurological injuries at Bad Ischl in Austria. On 27 October 1944, he was operated on by a leading brain surgeon, Wilhelm Tönnis. Formerly a professor at the University of Würzburg, Tönnis was one of the most notable German specialists. Initially it was thought that the operation had been successful, but the progression of the tumour had only been slowed. In November 1944 Richthofen was officially relieved of his command in Italy and transferred to the Führerreserve. His condition declined steadily in early 1945. It is thought likely that Tönnis attempted a second operation, but that the tumour had progressed beyond hope of recovery. Germany surrendered on 8 May 1945. The hospital was taken over by the American Third Army, and Richthofen became a prisoner of war.

He died on 12 July 1945 as an American prisoner of war in the air force hospital in Bad Ischl. His gravesite in the Bad Ischl cemetery has not been preserved, but his name is engraved on the cemetery cross next to the names of the people buried in war graves at the time.

== Reputation ==
=== Nazism ===
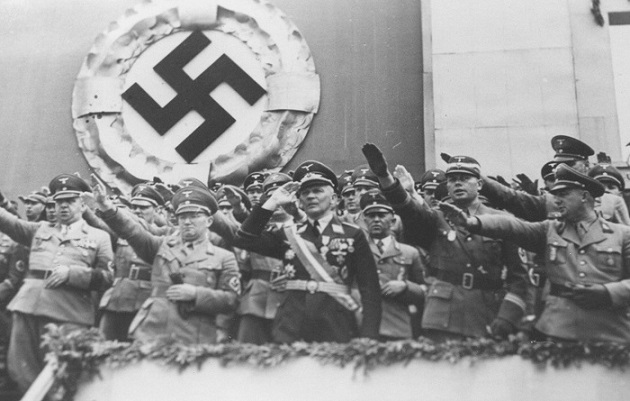
Richthofen at the Lüneburg Nazi Party Day Rally, 1939

The German Officer Corps was generally supportive of Adolf Hitler and the Nazi Party. They supported German re-armament, Hitler's disarming of the Sturmabteilung, and lauded the Nazi leader's promises to establish the Reichswehr as the sole military organisation in the Third Reich. The appointment of Werner von Blomberg further bolstered support for Hitler among the remaining aristocratic army officers. Richthofen was an open admirer of Hitler, and by extension of the Nazi cause. In 1938, Richthofen crossed the boundaries keeping politics and military officers separate, when he gave a speech at a Nazi-sponsored "Party Day" rally in Lüneburg. From the lectern, he extolled the virtues of Hitler's wisdom and leadership. Richthofen stated that the Nazi Party provided a strong sense of national unity and expressed the view that Germany would once again become a great power. Richthofen's sincerity cannot be doubted, for he was not compelled to make public speeches and did not need to play political games to safeguard or advance his career.

Richthofen's view of Nazi ideology was not straightforward. Richthofen was "remarkably uninterested in politics or political ideology". His politics consisted of simple nationalism and belief in the leader, ideas common to his class. Though an admirer of Hitler, he was uninterested in the politics of the party, believing it lacked any coherent ideology beyond following the leadership of Adolf Hitler. Nevertheless, Richthofen never wavered in his admiration for Hitler and sincerely believed that Germany's military decline, and the disastrous military decisions, were the fault of the General Staff advising Hitler. Richthofen subscribed to the Hitler myth—that the Nazi leader was a genius, who would revitalise Germany. Richthofen's diary—which survived the war—has many examples of conversations with fellow officers in which he expresses his confidence in Hitler. After one briefing, in the summer of 1943, Richthofen praised Hitler's "brilliant grasp" of military strategy, and blamed the "idiotic" Alfred Jodl and Wilhelm Keitel for the failures of the Wehrmacht. Richthofen's biographer observed that he did not appear to question why a genius surrounded himself with incompetents and "yes men".

Richthofen and Hitler maintained their harmonious relationship largely because they never worked closely together. Hitler, a soldier in the First World War, appreciated front-line fighting men and the perspective they brought back from the battlefield. Richthofen saw himself in this light, as a clear-thinking commander who had experienced the reality of the front. Because they met only occasionally, Richthofen maintained his idealised perception of Hitler.

Throughout German history, and in other militaries, leaders rewarded high-ranking military commanders for their service. These awards went from medals, to titles, to the appropriation of estates. Hitler practised the same policy, although his methods were fundamentally corrupt. When Richthofen was promoted to field marshal in 1943, he became a beneficiary of financial payments that were not part of the state's expenses and were transferred secretly. Richthofen was on "List C", which earned him 4,000 Reichsmarks monthly; this was a standard monthly sum for the rank. This was an annual salary for the average German worker, and the manner of transfer allowed Richthofen to avoid income tax, thus committing fraud. Hitler used the system to keep his generals loyal to the war's end, and Richthofen accepted the payments.

=== War crimes analysis ===
Richthofen is often regarded as a war criminal in the "popular German press", because of the aerial bombings of Guernica in 1937 and Warsaw in 1939. In Corum's view, this perception is based on the mythology surrounding German aerial doctrine of the time, which asserted without evidence that the Luftwaffe had a policy of "terror bombing" for which killing civilians and terrorising civil populations into submission was the primary aim. The sensationalism of press coverage since the bombings and "grossly inflated casualty figures" have not helped Richthofen's image. Corum asserts Guernica was never intended as a model for aerial terror attacks.

Warsaw, however, appeared to have all the hallmarks of a "terror attack": the use of high explosives and incendiary bombs (632 tons) destroyed a portion of the city and killed an estimated 6,000 civilians or non-combatants. The casualty figures have been exaggerated in contemporary and post-war accounts. Corum argues that the bombing was a "cruel act of war", but international law, as it was then commonly understood, allowed for the bombardment of a defended city, and at that time Warsaw had approximately 150,000 Polish soldiers defending its districts. Corum argued it was in the German interest to secure victory through aerial bombing and avoid potentially costly urban warfare. The Luftwaffe had limited ability to carry out "massive" strategic bombing operations, even if terror bombing had formed part of German doctrine. Corum also exculpates Richthofen for involvement in the attack on Belgrade in April 1941 (Operation Retribution). Richthofen was active against Greek Army positions in northern Greece at the time; Corum rejects the conclusions of some historians who associate Richthofen with the death of 17,000 civilians—which Corum also argues is inflated.

Corum concludes Richthofen was not a "master of terror bombing" and never made it his "prime operational method. When he bombed towns and cities he did it for justifiable tactical and operational reasons. His manner was ruthless and he never expressed any moral qualms about his actions, nor did he show any sympathy for the people he bombed." This was a ruthless trait Richthofen shared with Allied air commanders, who did not agonise over the destruction of towns and cities if it offered a military advantage. The 1907 Hague Convention included little on aerial warfare. Articles 23, 25 and 27 forbade attacks on undefended cities, civilians or specific monuments. The convention's vagueness offered large and obvious loopholes for air power practitioners.

Richtofen was morally guilty of war crimes. His personal responsibility, as a high-ranking commander in the Luftwaffe, was in his willingness to support Hitler's grand program of conquest. During the war, the Wehrmacht systematically violated the rules of war and norms of civilisation. On 6 June 1941 the High Command issued the Commissar Order, which was sent throughout the chain of command of both the army and air force. The nature of the war on the Eastern Front—which differed enormously from its prosecution in Western Europe—can have left no doubt in the minds of senior Wehrmacht commanders that Germany was operating outside the rules of international law.

Although the German mistreatment of Soviet prisoners of war was largely the responsibility of the German Army and not the Air Force, Corum argues that the Luftwaffe cannot escape culpability for the part it played in the deaths of 1.6 to 3.3 million prisoners. In his opinion, the Luftwaffe soldiers, ground forces and personnel exhibited the same callous disregard for prisoners. Corum writes that according to "one account", Richthofen's air corps moved into an airfield so rapidly that Soviet ground crews were found working in the facility. The unknown number were locked in a hangar, while the Luftwaffe waited for them to be taken off the airfield. They were denied food or water for several days. When Richthofen was told, he "heartily approved." Slave labour was also used to build airfields in Eastern Europe, and there is no evidence that workers were treated any better by the Luftwaffe than by the German army. Few questions were raised by senior Luftwaffe officers about Nazi policy, and there were even fewer objections.

=== Military legacy ===
Richthofen is credited with contributions to the development of modern air-ground joint operations which encompassed the tactical and operational level. In 1942 his relationship with Erich von Manstein was a partnership of "two great operational minds." While Richthofen may have had a "superb" military mind, it was oriented toward the practical and technical. He had little interest in literature, culture or ideas.

Richthofen was one of the few air commanders who pioneered practical solutions to the cooperation of ground and air forces, rather than developing theory. The successes of the German military in 1939 and 1940 placed them three years ahead of the Allied powers. No senior commander in the Luftwaffe put as much effort into developing close air support tactics from 1936 to 1942, or achieved comparable success. Of particular note was his secondment of airmen to the army with specialised vehicles that allowed the army and air force to direct air strikes from the frontlines. Not all of his methods were revolutionary. Age-old principles, such as employing forces en masse at the decisive points (focus of effort), were standard military practice stretching back centuries.

In the 1920s and 1930s, Richthofen's biographer argues that he can be seen as one of "air power's visionaries" for his understanding of how the development of the aeroplane and air power could change the battlefield, and for how he worked to make it a reality. Richthofen was also supportive of rocketry and jet propulsion while working at the Technical Research Office, at a time when leaders of the other major powers settled for larger piston-engine aircraft. During his time at the technical office, it was Richthofen who issued the contracts that led to the development of the V-1, the first practical cruise missile, and the V-2, the first long-range ballistic missile. These orders allowed for the development of German jet engines.

== Dates of rank ==
22 March 1913:	Fähnrich
19 June 1914:	Leutnant
29 February 1920:	Temporary Oberleutnant
1 November 1923:	Rejoined the Army with rank of Leutnant
31 July 1925:	Oberleutnant
1 February 1929:	Hauptmann
1 June 1933:	Major
20 April 1936:	Oberstleutnant
23 January 1938:	Oberst
1 November 1938:	Generalmajor
19 July 1940:	General der Flieger
1 February 1942:	Generaloberst
16 February 1943:	Generalfeldmarschall

== Awards ==
- Iron Cross (1914)
  - 2nd Class (21 September 1914)
  - 1st Class (June 1918)
- Order of the Crown (Prussia) 3rd Class
- Pilot's Badge German Empire
- Honour Cross of the World War 1914/1918
- Military Medal (Spain) With Diamonds
- Medalla de la Campaña (1936-1939)
- Spanish Cross In Gold with Diamonds
- Clasp to the Iron Cross (1939)
  - 2nd Class (12 September 1939)
  - 1st Class (25 September 1939)
- Front Flying Clasp of the Luftwaffe
- Eastern Front Medal
- Wehrmacht Long Service Award 1st to 4th Class
- Order of Michael the Brave 2nd and 3rd class
- Pilot/Observer Badge In Gold with Diamonds
- Knight's Cross of the Iron Cross with Oak Leaves
  - Knight's Cross on 17 May 1940 as Generalmajor and commanding general of the VIII. Fliegerkorps
  - 26th Oak Leaves on 17 July 1941 as General der Flieger and commanding general of the VIII. Fliegerkorps

== Notes ==
Military offices
Preceded by none	Commander of VIII. Fliegerkorps; 19 July 1939 – 30 June 1942	Succeeded by General der Flieger Martin Fiebig
Preceded by Generaloberst Alexander Löhr	Commander of Luftflotte 4; 20 July 1942 – 4 September 1943	Succeeded by Generaloberst Otto Deßloch
Preceded by Generalfeldmarschall Albert Kesselring	Commander of Luftflotte 2; 11 June 1943 – 27 September 1944	Succeeded by disbanded
