= Conțești, Dâmbovița =

Conțești
- Commune
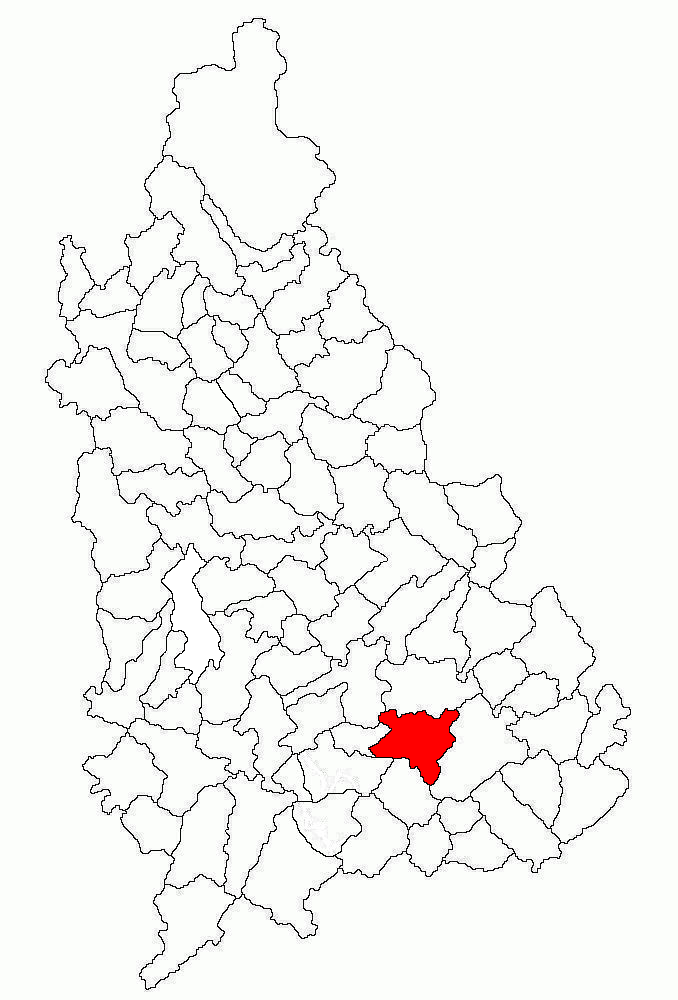
- Location in Dâmbovița County

- Location in Romania
- Coordinates: 44°39′N 25°38′E
- Country: Romania
- County: Dâmbovița

Government
  - Mayor (2024–2028): Marian Nicolae Alexandru (PSD)
- Area: 52.46 km^{2} (20.25 sq mi)
- Elevation: 158 m (518 ft)
- Population (2021-12-01): 4,489
  - Density: 86/km^{2} (220/sq mi)
- Time zone: EET/EEST (UTC+2/+3)
- Postal code: 137125
- Area code: +(40) 245
- Vehicle reg.: DB
- Website: primariacontesti.ro

Conțești is a commune in Dâmbovița County, Muntenia, Romania. It is composed of eight villages: Bălteni, Boteni, Călugăreni, Conțești, Crângași, Gămănești, Heleșteu, and Mereni.

Historical population
Year	Pop.	±%
2002	5,563	—
2011	5,123	−7.9%
2021	4,489	−12.4%
Source: Census data
