= Otto Deßloch =

WW2 German Luftwaffe general (1889-1977)

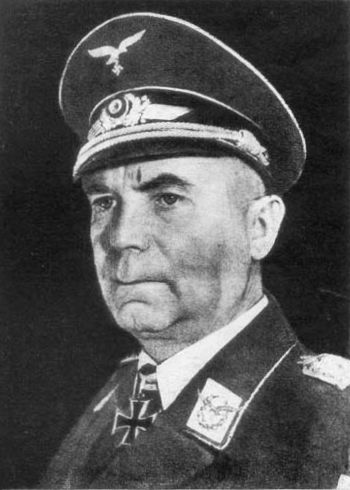
- Deßloch in 1944
- Born: 11 June 1889; Bamberg, Kingdom of Bavaria, German Empire
- Died: 13 May 1977 (aged 87); Munich, Bavaria, West Germany
- Military career
- Allegiance: German Empire; Weimar Republic; Nazi Germany
- Branch: German Army; Luftwaffe
- Service years: 1910–1945
- Rank: Generaloberst
- Conflicts: World War I World War II
- Awards: Knight's Cross of the Iron Cross with Oak Leaves

Otto Deßloch (11 June 1889 – 13 May 1977) was a German Luftwaffe general during World War II and recipient of the Knight's Cross of the Iron Cross with Oak Leaves of Nazi Germany.

== Career ==
Deßloch was born in Bamberg, he joined the Bavarian Army in 1910 and served during World War I. After the German defeat, he joined the Freikorps forces of Franz von Epp, fighting against the communist Bavarian Soviet Republic. From 1921, he served as an intelligence officer in the German Reichswehr. In the course of German re-armament, he attended the secret Lipetsk fighter-pilot school in 1926–27. Deßloch took part in the fast build-up of the Luftwaffe after the Nazi seizure of power in 1933, from 1 December 1934 as commander of a Deutsche Verkehrsfliegerschule (flight training school). From 1935 he served as commander of two Luftwaffe wings.

During World War II he commanded a Luftflotte 2 corps from 3 October 1939 and was appointed Major general and commander of the 6th flight division on 1 January. He provided air support to the Heer Army Group B in the 1940 Battle of France and from 1941 commanded Luftwaffe units on the Eastern Front. Promoted to General der Flakartillerie on 1 January 1942, he served as a commander on the southern Eastern Front and in the Caucasus Mountains. On 11 June 1943 Deßloch succeeded Wolfram Freiherr von Richthofen as commander-in-chief of Luftflotte 4 in the rank of Colonel general.

When in the summer 1944 the Western Front collapsed, Deßloch was appointed commander of Luftflotte 3 by Hermann Göring to replace dismissed Hugo Sperrle. After Paris was liberated by the Allied forces, Deßloch commanded an air unit that, in retaliation, bombed the city destroying civilian targets and killing 200 French civilians in September 1944. The attack was carried out on Hitler's personal order. From September he again served as commander of Luftflotte 4 until he succeeded Robert Ritter von Greim as head of Luftflotte 6 during the last days of the war. Deßloch was interned by the Allies until 1948.

He died in Munich in 1977.

== Awards ==
- Iron Cross (1914) 2nd Class (20 August 1914) & 1st Class (21 September 1915)
- Bavarian Military Merit Order 4th Class with Swords (19 April 1915) & 4th Class with Crown and Swords (9 November 1917)
- Honor Goblet of the Luftwaffe
- Wound Badge (1914) in Black (15 May 1918)
- Clasp to the Iron Cross (1939) 2nd Class (13 May 1940) & 1st Class (24 May 1940)
- Knight's Cross of the Iron Cross with Oak Leaves
  - 74th Knight's Cross on 24 June 1940 as Generalmajor and commanding general of the II. Flak-Korps
  - 470th Oak Leaves on 10 May 1944 as Generaloberst and commander in chief of Luftflotte 4

Military offices
Preceded by none	Commander of Kampfgeschwader 155; 1 April 1936 – 1 February 1938	Succeeded by Generalmajor Wilhelm Süssmann
Preceded by none	Commander of II Flak Corps; 30 October 1939 – 31 March 1942	Succeeded by General der Flakartillerie Job Odebrecht
Preceded by Generalfeldmarschall Wolfram Freiherr von Richthofen	Commander of Luftflotte 4; 4 September 1943 – 17 August 1944	Succeeded by Generalleutnant Alexander Holle
Preceded by Generalleutnant Alexander Holle	Commander of Luftflotte 4; 28 September 1944 – 21 April 1945	Succeeded by redesignated to Luftwaffenkommando 4
Preceded by Generalfeldmarschall Robert Ritter von Greim	Commander of Luftflotte 6; 27 April 1945 – 8 May 1945	Succeeded by disbanded
