= Klemensowo =

- Village
- Location within Poland
- Coordinates: 52°37′13″N 16°24′06″E
- Country: Poland
- Voivodeship: Greater Poland
- County: Szamotuły
- Gmina: Ostroróg

Klemensowo [klɛmɛnˈsɔvɔ] is a village in the administrative district of Gmina Ostroróg, within Szamotuły County, Greater Poland Voivodeship, in west-central Poland.
