= Kampfgeschwader 55 =

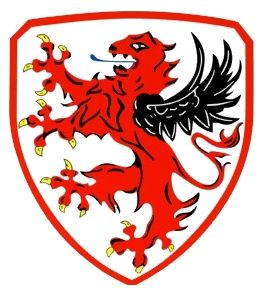
- Unit insignia
- Active: 1 May 1939 – c. 27 April 1945
- Country: Nazi Germany
- Branch: Luftwaffe
- Type: Air Force wing
- Role: Air interdiction close air support Offensive counter air Maritime interdiction Strategic bombing
- Size: Air Force Wing
- Nickname: Greif
- Engagements: Polish Campaign; Battle of Belgium; Battle of France; Battle of Britain; The Blitz; Eastern Front

Commanders
- Notable commanders: Alois Stoeckl

Insignia
- Identification symbol: Geschwaderkennung of G1

Kampfgeschwader 55 "Greif" (KG 55 or Battle Wing 55) was a Luftwaffe bomber unit during World War II. KG 55 was one of the longest serving and well-known in the Luftwaffe. The wing operated the Heinkel He 111 exclusively until 1943, when only two staffeln of its four Gruppen (Groups) used the Junkers Ju 88C.

Founded in May 1939, the Geschwader (Wing) was a product of a late surge in expanding the size of the Luftwaffe medium bomber forces. The formation of the wing began on 1 May 1939 with the creation of the command (Stab) Gruppe (Group) and I. and II./KG 55 (first and second groups). III./KG 55 was formed on 1 November 1939 two months after the outbreak of war in Europe. IV.(Erg.)/KG 55 was formed on 1 August 1940 to train new crews sent to the Geschwader. The formation's first Geschwaderkommodore was Wilhelm Süssmann.

KG 55 first saw action in the German invasion of Poland in September 1939. During the Phoney War—September 1939–April 1940—the bomber wing flew armed reconnaissance missions over France. In May 1940 KG 55 participated in the Battle of Belgium and Battle of France through to the end of the campaigns in June 1940.

In July 1940 KG 55 took part in the Battle of Britain but suffered significant losses in the battle. On 14 August KG 55 lost Geschwaderkommodore Alois Stoeckl killed over England. It continued operations over the British Isles during The Blitz until June 1941. KG 55 attacked targets over Northern Ireland, Scotland and Wales.

In June 1941 the unit's Gruppen participated in Operation Barbarossa and spent the next years on the Eastern front. KG 55 flew most of its operations on the southern sector in support of Army Group South, a front-level battle group of the German Army. KG 55's groups participated in the early successes which included the large battles of encirclements at Kiev and First Battle of Kharkov. The command also took part in the Battle of Moscow and bombed the city.

In 1942 KG 55 participated in the Second Battle of Kharkov and the Battle of the Caucasus and Battle of Stalingrad. KG 55 continued to operate as a bomber unit and air supply unit to support the German Army and also undertook some strategic bombing operations in 1943 and 1944. In the aftermath of the Battle of Kursk the unit was increasingly forced to fly at night owing to the Soviet Air Force achieving air superiority. In 1944 it carried out counter-air operations against United States Army Air Force (USAAF) forces based in the Soviet Union.

In October 1944 I., II., and III., were re-designated KG(J) to convert to fighter aircraft for the Defence of the Reich operations. The Gruppen remained active until the last day of the war. IV.(Erg.)/KG 55 was disbanded on 21 November 1944. The independent 14.(Eis)/KG 55 on 27 April 1945.

For the duration of the war, KG 55 flew 54,272 combat operations, dropped 60,938 metric tons of bombs, carried 7,514 metric tons of supplies from 1 September 1939 to 1 October 1944. The Geschwader lost 710 men killed in action and 747 missing.

== History ==
On 1 April 1934 a unit called the Hanseatische Fliegerschule e. V. was formed, initially based at Fassberg. This organisation was formed into a Geschwader (wing) and created as a Kampfgeschwader (battle or bomber wing) on 1 May 1939. The command staffel (squadron), or Stab unit, was created from KG 155, a defunct bomber unit on 1 May 1939. The organisation was created at Giessen aerodrome and was subordinated to Luftflotte 4 (Air Fleet 4). The Stabsstaffel was placed under the command of Wilhelm Süssmann, who became the first Geschwaderkommodore of KG 55. The unit trained intensively over the spring and summer, 1939. On 31 August Süssmann was ordered to Wesendorf in preparation for an attack on Poland. The unit was equipped with the Heinkel He 111P-4 medium bomber.

I. Gruppe was formed at Langendiebach on 1 May 1939. This unit was formed from I./KG 155. The unit was expanded and trained on the He 111 through to 26 August. The Gruppe was placed on alert on that day and transferred to Dedelstorf on 31 August 1939 under the command of Gruppenkommandeur (Group Commander) Major Walter Traub. The group remained active until 1 May 1943 when it was re-designated Lehrgeschwader 1 (Training and Experimental Wing 1) and transferred to that wing. I./KG 55 was reformed on 10 June 1943 at Stalino in the Soviet Union using personnel from Transportfliegergruppe 10, the former Kampfgruppe zur besonderen Verwendung 5 (KGr. z.b.v. 5, Fighting Group for Special Use).

II./KG 55 was also founded at Giessen and trained alongside I./KG 55. Data records that it had 31 He 111s when it was ordered to the airbase at Wesendorf under the leadership of Gruppenkommandeur Otto von Lachemair. III./KG 55 was officially formed at Neudorf near Oppeln in Silesia on 1 December 1939. The staffeln began forming exactly a month earlier on 1 November. The formation spent the winter training on the He 111 and were ready for operations by May 1940. The Gruppe was operational by March and was placed on high alert on 24 March. It was based at Gablingen until the western offensive. Major Hans Schemmell commanded the unit from 1 December 1939 – 30 September 1940.

The Geschwader was the largest homogeneous flying formation in the Luftwaffe which usually 90-120-aircraft strong. Each Geschwader was split into three to four Gruppen (groups) of 30 to 40 aircraft. Finally, the Gruppen were split into Staffeln (squadrons) containing 12 to 15 aircraft.

== World War II ==
=== Invasion of Poland ===
On 1 September 1939 Adolf Hitler issued orders for Fall Weiss (Case White) to be implemented and the Wehrmacht attacked Poland. KG 55 was placed under the command of the 4. Flieger Division (4th Air Division) under the command of General Alfred Keller. The Flieger Division was subordinated to Luftflotte 4. KG 55 flew attacks against Polish Air Force airfields on 3 September, after being left out of the campaign's first two days. The Geschwaderstab and I./KG 55 were ordered to Maerzdorf/Ohlau and II./KG 55 was moved to Rosenborn. Whilst there the crews listened to operational experiences from the Dornier Do 17-equipped Kampfgeschwader 4.

Commander-in-chief of Luftflotte 4, Alexander Löhr, ordered KG 55 into action and the wing bombed railway targets in support of the German Fourth Army. The attacks were made in a 10–30 degree dive from altitudes of 2,000 metres (6,600 feet). The operations were so successful it reduced the number of targets and the bombers reverted to close air support operations. The rail lines on the Radom–Kraków line were permanently severed. KG 55 flew 13 operations and 275 individual sorties; the Stabsstaffel flew 13 armed reconnaissance missions.

KG 55 was also heavily involved in the Battle of the Bzura. Three Polish Army groups attempted to break out of an encirclement and the German Eighth Army could not contain the attack. The Luftwaffe initiated a large air offensive against the Polish forces on 8 September. I. and II./KG 55 were involved in attacking communication targets while other units offered close air support. The offensive was successful and the Polish resistance broken. Operations moved south thereafter, operations against bridges on the Vistula and attacks against Polish forces retreating towards Romania also absorbed much of the wing's effort. The Geschwader suffered its first loss when one bomber made a forced-landing with no casualties on 11 September during long-range operations against Przemysl. The Luftwaffe was flying further to the east by this stage.

On 12 September 1939 Commander-in-Chief of the Luftwaffe Hermann Göring visited the unit. I./KG 55 flew against target in the Dubno area on 15 September as operations wound down. On this date KG 55 flew 363 individual sorties. By the 20 September the number of sorties flown stood at 670. On the night of the 16/17 September Luftflotte 4 was ordered to stand down and cease operations as part of the Nazi-Soviet Pact. The Red Army invaded Poland the following morning. II./KG 55 was moved back to Giessen on 22 September. During the campaign KG 55 suffered one complete loss of aircraft and crew, in which an Oberleutnant Walter Fritz and his crew from 1./KG 55 were killed in action south west of L'vov.

Following the conclusion of operations in Poland, which ended on 6 October 1939, I./KG 55 transferred to Ingolstadt-Manching on 9 October. Then the Gruppe moved to Neuburg an der Donau on 13 February 1940. It flew some reconnaissance operations over France dropping leaflets in the Nancy area and over the Maginot Line. The formation moved to Fürstenfeldbruck Air Base on 2 March but reverted to Neuburg on 23 April. II./KG 55 moved to Ingolstadt on 10 November 1939 and moved to Schwäbisch-Hall on 13 January 1940 under the 5th Flieger Division. It moved to Leipheim and on 3 February 1940 flew at least one leaflet mission in eastern France. III./KG 55 were combat ready and were stationed at Gablingen.

=== Battle of France ===
The end of the Phoney War on 10 May 1940 came with Operation Fall Gelb (Case Yellow), the invasion of France and the Low Countries. Stab./KG 55 had six He 111s at Leipham for the operation. The Geschwader was placed under the command of Luftflotte 3 (Air Fleet 3) although it was still subordinated to the 5th Flieger Division. I./KG 55 committed 35 (25 serviceable) He 111s to the offensive. II./KG 55 could muster 36 He 111s (24 operational) and 17 of 36 He 111s on strength with III./KG 55 were combat ready. The units were to be engaged in counter-air operations against the French Armée de l'air.

Stab./KG 55 began operations on 10 May in the Lorraine region of France, which would include missions over Nancy, Toul and Epinal. In the first day of action the Geschwader did not suffer any casualties. II. and III./KG 55 attacked Nancy-Essey Airport which was heavily damaged. I./KG 55 attacked Toul-Croix de Metz Airfield. I./KG 55 moved to Baltringen in the evening and flew a long-range operation against rail depots in Orléans on 11 May. II./KG 55 flew attacks against similar targets but included bombing rail and bridge targets around Châteaudun on 12 May. KG 55 flew attacks against 38 airfields from 11 to 13 May. Hugo Sperrle, commanding Luftflotte 3, claimed 100 Allied aircraft on the ground in these operation and another 100–150 in hangars. A second operation hit the railway of Rethel. Stab./KG 55 attacked the Châteaudun Air Base and supported German army advances at Charleville-Mézières and the Battle at Sedan. From 11 May–2 June it flew operations against Châteauroux-Déols Air Base, Orleans, Soissons and Lyon – Mont Verdun Air Bases.

I./KG 55 moved again to Malmsheim near Stuttgart. The formation attacked Soissons on 15 May and Reims on 18 May supported by II./KG 55. III./KG 55 was confined to more northern operations: attacking Verdun on 16 May and flying the only known mission of the unit in the Battle of Belgium, to Charleroi, three days earlier on 13 May before moving to Eutingen on 24 May. Through May, KG 55 operated were engaged against targets in central, southern, and eastern France. The unit did not participate in the battles against the British forces in the Battle of Dunkirk and Lille. KG 55, was however involved in anti-shipping operations in the English Channel. On 1 June it was transferred to IV Fliegerkorps to participate in these operations.

In May losses were sustained. On 12 May Allied fighters shot down a Heinkel of 4./KG 55, whilst it was attacking railway targets North East of Reims, for the unit's first loss of the battle. The next day, 13 May, cost KG 55 ten machines, six from Stab. and 4./KG 55. On that day alone the unit's losses had exceeded that of the Polish Campaign. The losses suffered by KG 55 on 13 May were the worst of the war. A further seven machines were damaged and forced to land throughout the remainder of the fighting, although only two machines and crews were completely lost. The first of these, a 9./KG 55 Heinkel, was flown by Unteroffizier Horst Mahnert. Whilst returning from a mission to bomb airfields in the Lyon area on 2 June 1940 it strayed into Swiss airspace and was shot down near Ursins by Capitaine Hans Thurnheer in a Swiss Air Force Messerschmitt Bf 109.

In June KG 55 continued long-range operations. It is believed the Geschwader flew to Marseille on 1 June 1940 on a leaflet-dropping exercise with Kampfgeschwader 53. On 3 June the entire wing flew on Operation Paula—a mass attack against industrial targets around Paris. It supported the drive of the Army Group B to Paris until the city's capture on 14 June. The last operations were flown on 22 June 1940, three days before the French surrender. From 6–19 June the formation operated in Geschwader-strength against troop concentrations and rail targets around Nancy. Between 20 and 23 June 1940, KG 55 were already operating over the United Kingdom, bombing targets in Bristol and Cardiff flying from forward airfields near Paris.

KG 55 flew 886 combat operations against troop concentrations, 725 against rail targets, 406 against airfields, 49 anti-shipping operations and harbour attacks, 148 armed reconnaissance sorties and 46 dropping leaflets for the duration of the French campaign. I./KG 55 flew 897 missions and lost 10 bombers. II./KG 55 flew 571 combat sorties and lost 11 Heinkels. From 10 May—23 June 1940 III./KG 55 flew 595 combat missions and lost 9 bombers.

=== Battle of Britain ===
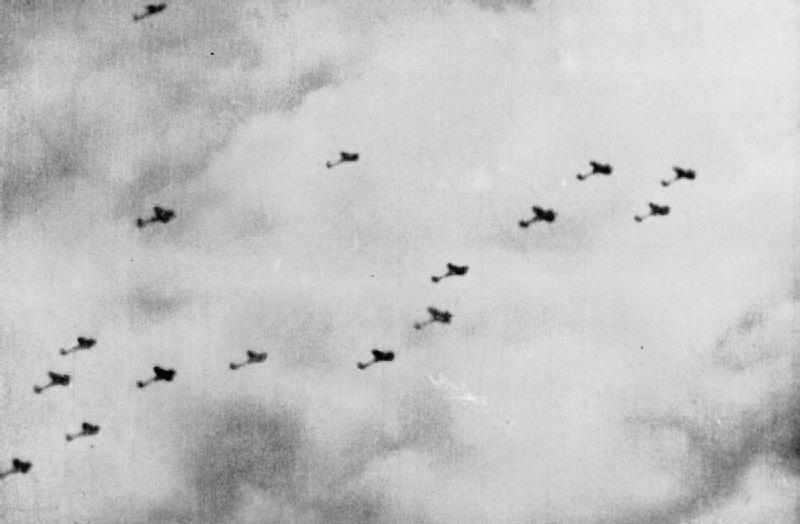
A still from camera-gun film taken from a Supermarine Spitfire No. 609 Squadron RAF, flown by Pilot Officer J D Bisdee. It captures He 111s of KG 55 which had just bombed the Supermarine aircraft works, Southampton.

After the success in France KG 55 moved into the country and occupied airfields in the Paris area. In July 1940 the Luftwaffe began its first phase of operations over Britain. The escalating air activity over the English Channel was called the Kanalkampf, which officially began the Battle of Britain on 10 July. Throughout the summer German air operations gradually pressed inland to destroy RAF Fighter Command in southern England as a prelude to Operation Sealion, a seaborne invasion of the United Kingdom.

For KG 55 initial losses were light in these skirmishes. The first loss occurred on 11 July 1940, when 2./KG 55 lost He 111 Werknummer 2648 G1+LK, piloted by Oberfeldwebel Erich Slotosch. They became the first of the Geschwader casualties; all were taken prisoner of war. Later in the action two He 111s collided while in combat with No. 601 Squadron RAF over Channel with the loss of all crews. On the night 11/12 July Luftwaffe nuisance raids persisted with Geschwaderkommodore Alois Stoeckl leading II.KG 55—which would become a night pathfinder unit in the Blitz—attacked Cardiff, Wales. On 13 July another He 111 piloted by Oberleutnant Kleinhanns was shot down by No. 43 Squadron RAF over Southwick while on a reconnaissance flight. III./KG 55 lost another He 111 on the 19 July off Shoreham to No. 145 Squadron RAF as the Channel battles intensified.

On 13 August KG 55 was involved in Adlertag the all-out offensive against the Royal Air Force (RAF) in southern England, attacking the port of Plymouth, Feltham and RAF Middle Wallop without loss. The following day, KG 55 was to suffer its most significant loss. On 14 August 1940 He 111P G1 + AA was shot down near the Royal Naval Armament Depot at East Dean in Hampshire. Geschwaderkommodore Oberst Alois Stoeckl and his crew were killed. He was replaced by Major Hans Korte of I./KG 55. Major Friedrich Kless took over command of I./KG 55. Stoeckl and his crews were able to bomb the airfield but the Kommodore fell to the RAF ace John Dundas. KG 55 continue to operate against RAF airfields. On 16 August 1940 it bombed Heathrow Airport. On 26 August it took part in Luftflotte 3's last major daylight raid for three weeks as the air fleet was reassigned to attacking the West and East Midlands industrial areas.

For a period of three weeks KG 55 was mainly assigned to night raids on aircraft production factories over England, though there were some notable daylight raids on Bristol and Southampton. On 4 September 1940 27 He 111s from III./KG 55 led by Major Hans Schemmell attacked Portland. They feinted towards Southampton and bombed the port causing little damage. They were intercepted by No. 152 Squadron RAF and lost one bomber and another damaged.

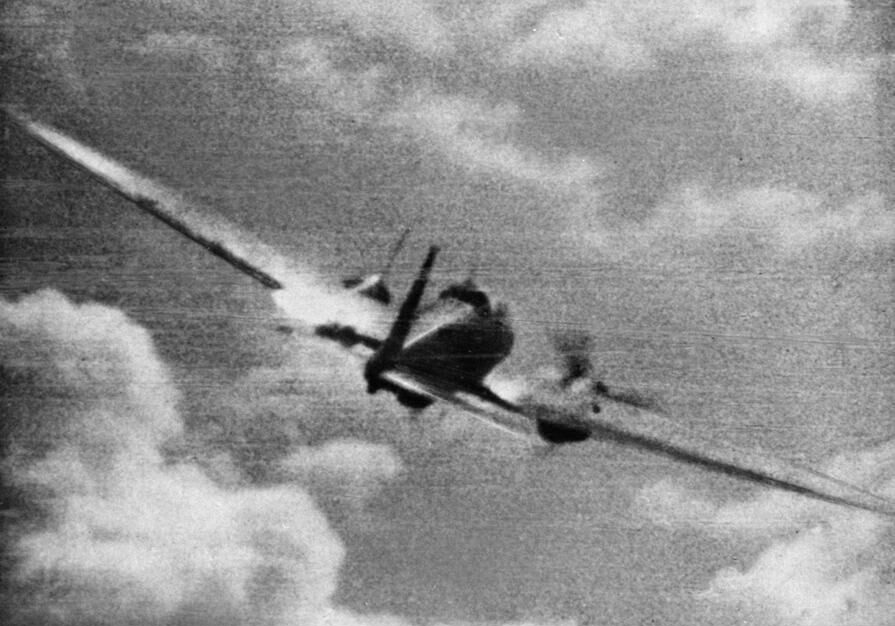
He 111 under fire, 25 September 1940. The bomber was from either KG 53 or KG 55.

On 25 September 1940 all three air groups took part in a raid on the Bristol Aeroplane Company factory at Filton. German reconnaissance discovered the surrounding airspace was sparsely protected. A formation of 58 Heinkels supported by Junkers Ju 88s from Lehrgeschwader 1. A formation of Messerschmitt Bf 110s from Erprobungsgruppe 210 marked the target. RAF controllers mistakenly believed the target to be the Westland Whirlwind factory at Yeovil and sent three squadrons to protect it. This enabled the bombers to bomb the target, stopping production and causing some 250 casualties at the factory and 107 in the surrounding area. 80 Bristol Beaufort and Bristol Blenheims were destroyed and dozens of others damaged. RAF fighters from No. 238 Squadron RAF and No. 229 Squadron RAF engaged the He 111s on their return to base, downing one He 111 and two escorting Bf 110s from III./Zerstörergeschwader 26.

Reconnaissance units incorrectly reported the aircraft factory lightly damaged. Consequently, 30 He 111s preceded by 19 Bf 110s from Erprobungsgruppe 210, and covered by 27 Bf 110s from ZG 26 attacked the factory again. This time five RAF squadrons met the raid. Three Bf 110s from ZG 26 were shot down and another damaged. Four Erprobungsgruppe 210s Bf 110s were shot down, but the Heinkels were protected as KG 55 escaped without loss but was forced to abandon the mission, drop its bombs and retreat to France.

On 29 September, KG 55 attacked the Merseyside area. Oberstleutnant Hans Korte led III./KG 55 across No. 10 Group RAF's area again. At 18:00 they flew into the Irish Sea, but they had been tracked by Cornish radar. 11 Hawker Hurricanes of No. 79 Squadron RAF intercepted. 7. and 8. Staffel slipped away but the 9th was caught against the setting sun and spotted. Three bombers were hit; one was shot down, another written off landing in France and one was assessed as fifty percent damaged. The gunners defended tenaciously and shot down three 79 Hurricanes; one pilot was killed, the other rescued by British naval craft, but the third was rescued by the Irish and interned.

The following day KG 55 tried to bomb the Westland plant at Yeovil. Covered by 40 Bf 110s from ZG 26 and 52 Bf 109s from JG 2 and JG 53, they were intercepted by around nine squadrons. KG 55 made it through to Yeovil despite fighter attacks. KG 55 were complimentary to ZG 26, which it noted, fought with great distinction to protect KG 55. The Bf 110s were successful (a rare feat) against 152 Spitfires in particular - hitting five and destroying one. They also destroyed a further 10 fighters for one loss. JG 2 and JG 53 over exaggerated their claims. The raid against the plant failed. Thick cloud and under constant attack the bomber pilots aborted the mission which cost KG 55 three Heinkels. Diversions by KG 51 and KG 77 suffered losses. One Bf 109, five bombers and a Bf 110 were lost against 11 RAF fighters in total. Hugo Sperrle, commanding Luftflotte 3, regarded it as a success.

Between 10 July and 31 October 1940 KG 55 lost 73 machines to enemy action, and a further eight were shot down during 1940 in night operations over Britain. The last Heinkel lost in 1940, piloted by Unteroffizier Bruno Zimmermann, was shot down by Pilot Officer J. G Benson and Sergeant P. Blain in a Boulton Paul Defiant of No. 141 Squadron RAF over Sussex on 22 December.

=== Night war: the Blitz ===
After the Battle of Britain the Luftwaffe maintained pressure on Britain by attacking at night to avoid RAF Fighter Command. The Blitz, as it became known, was a series of heavy attacks against British cities in order to break the will of the civil population and destroy its industrial centres. KG 55 was involved in the campaign from the first operation to the last. II./KG 55 was selected to operate as a pathfinder unit alongside the specialist Kampfgruppe 100, and III./Kampfgeschwader 26. They were referred to in the Luftwaffe as Beleuchtergruppe (Firelighter Group). It was not equipped with special aids for this task unlike the other Geschwader, and has rarely been credited with this role. The crews were highly experienced in night operations and selected to help lead the attacks under the command of Major Friedrich Kless. The three units operated in unison often: KGr 100 illuminated the target with incendiaries and the later formations dropped high explosive bombs to destroy water mains and impede fire-fighting efforts.

II./KG 55 used Knickebein and Direction finding methods when British countermeasures from No. 80 Wing RAF did not impede them. They also learned to navigate by using searchlights and shell bursts from anti-aircraft artillery as a reference point because they denoted the close proximity of cities, coastlines and lights were often connected to railways. Good use was also made of British dummy airfields intended to lead German crews astray—they were carefully plotted and recorded. II./KG 55 used LC 50 parachute flares—an operation often attributed to KGr 100—then proceeded to bomb visually using Lotfernrohr 7 bomb sights. The Gruppe was predominantly equipped with He 111P-4s; the other units were equipped with more powerful He 111H-5s. The resulting Battle of the Beams lasted until the end of the Blitz. In one incident the British jamming succeeded in confusing the KG 55 He 111 piloted by Leutnant Hans Thurner, who landed on three occasions on RAF airfields in rapid succession before realising his error and escaping across the Channel.

On 1 November II./KG 55 was involved in three operations in one night to Bristol, Oxford and Skegness. The following night I., II. and III./KG 55 took part in the offensive against London. On 6/7, 7/8, and 11/12 December London was the target for all three groups. On the latter date, Bournemouth and Exmouth were also hit by III./KG 55. On 12/13 December the Geschwader returned to the capital. Among the most destructive attacks was Operation Mondscheinsonate (Moonlight Sonata), which was the code word for the attack on Coventry on 14 November 1940. after KGr 100 released their incendiaries 16 He 111s of II./KG 55 released a mixture of LC 50 parachute flares and five SC 1800 and 11 SC1400 SC (Sprengbomb-clyindrisch) heavy, general-purpose bombs, thin-cased to cause maximum damage on the surface. They were the heaviest German bombs available. A further five SC500 and 2,412 incendiaries were dropped. The full moon and absence of cloud made the use of Knickebein superfluous. The attack was a success and a large part of the city centre was destroyed. I. and III./KG 55 participated in the main waves. Meanwhile, I./KG 55 struck at Bournemouth and Portsmouth.

On the night of the 16/17 November 1940 13 He 111s of II./KG 55 led 159 bombers from Luftflotte 2 and 3 in an attack on Southampton destroying much of the city. 13 Heinkels of the group also led an attack on Birmingham on 19/20 November. They flew in the lead of 357 aircraft with KGr 100 joining in marking the target. The attack with incendiaries started fires that were visible from 47 miles (76 kilometres) away. The unit also guided 204 bombers to Birmingham on 21/22 November using 11 aircraft. Southampton was attacked by 121 bombers on 23/24 November and II./KG 55 was once again asked to lead the attack. On 27/28 November KG 55 was involved in the attack on Liverpool (324 bombers) and the continued air offensive against London (335 aircraft) on 28/29 November. On the last night of the month, Southampton was struck by 128 aircraft on 30 November/1 December 1940. III./KG 55 was involved in all of these operations.

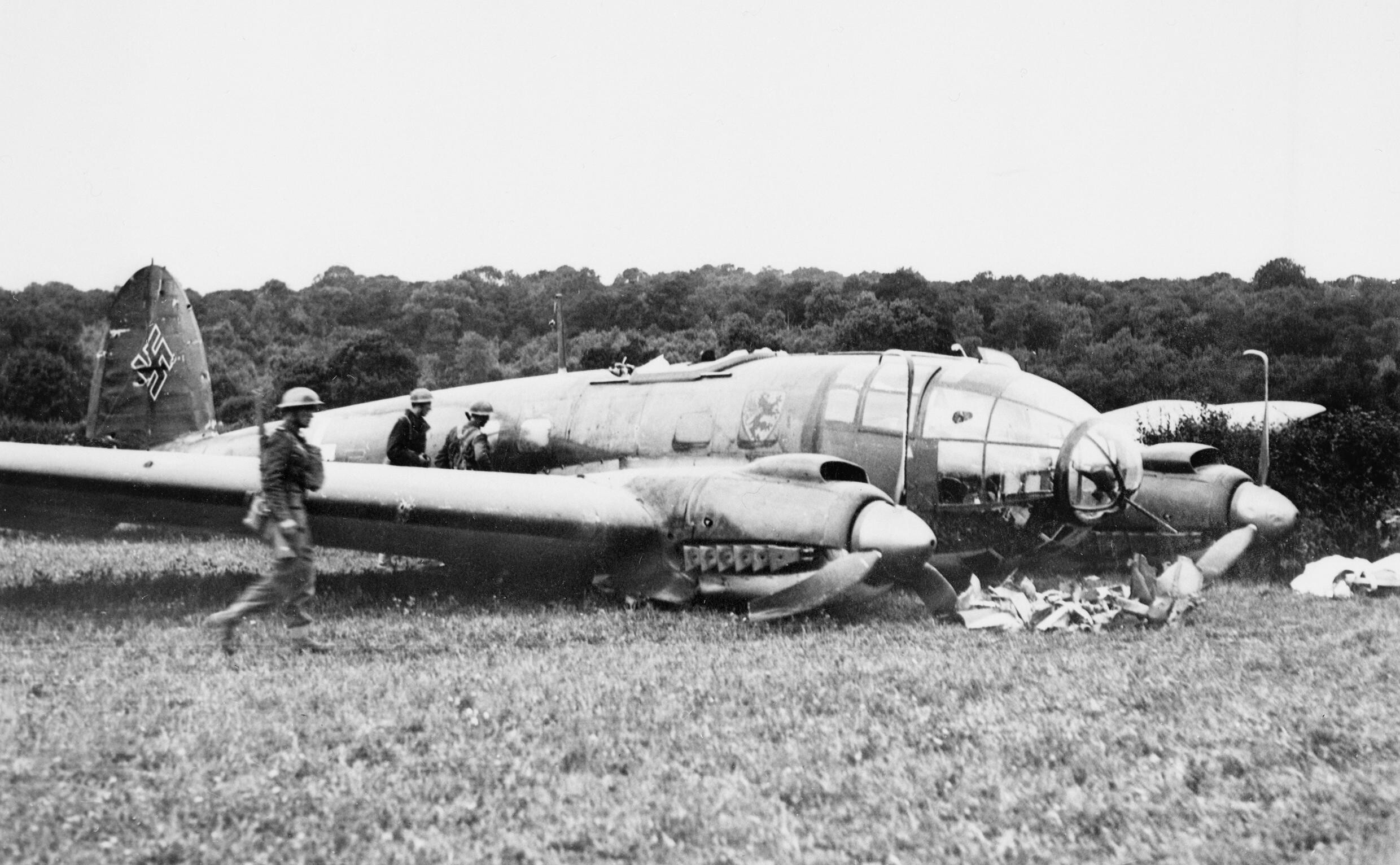
He 111 of Stab./KG 55 after crashing in England. The emblem is visible on the fuselage

In December the weather deteriorated and complicated night operations. II./KG 55 participated in 11 attacks during the month with all 30 of its aircraft available. KG 55's air groups were assigned to V Fliegerkorps in December attached to Luftflotte 3. During an attack Bristol on the night of the 24 November the Geschwader suffered its first casualty when a crew member was killed by anti-aircraft fire, but KG 55 suffered few casualties during the winter operations. The crews were ordered to expand their duties this time and report back on weather conditions for successive waves. A particular problem was the icing of airframes at higher altitudes. The radio operators were obliged to report straight away and used the W/T to do so. British Y-stations were able to intercept the transmissions which helped identify the unit but little more. Notable operations were carried out against Sheffield on 12/13 December and Liverpool on 21/22 December. On two successive nights from the 22–24 December, KG 55 supported the heavy bombing of Manchester and Plymouth. III./KG 55 is known to have attacked Birmingham alone this night.

The technological and intelligence war was also escalating. The RAF had been quick to discover Knickebein and effectively counter it. However, X-Verfahren systems in use among the pathfinders and some of the German bomber units were not disrupted. For much of the war 80 Wing believed their counter-efforts had affected the German navigational aids. They did however, solve the basics of Y-Verfahren but it would take two more months to counter the former aid. Operations were reduced in January due to the British weather. All groups were involved in remaining operations to Bristol on 3/4 January 1941, Manchester on 9/10 January, Portsmouth on 10/11 January and London the following night. Attacks on Avonmouth on 16/17 and Swansea on 17/18 January were the first to these targets. Records show that in the Portsmouth operation 19 of II./KG 55's He 111s dropped 18 LC 50 flares, eight SC1800, seven SD1400 (Sprengbombe Dickwandig bombs which had some penetrative power for armour-piercing purposes) and seven SC1000 bombs. Severe weather shut down II./KG 55's operations at its Chartres airfield until March 1941. This was the case for III./KG 55 at Villacoublay. III./KG 55 was grounded in Paris.

I./KG 55 moved to Le Bourget on 11 February while the other two Gruppen resumed operations from their stations of the previous winter. On 10/11 March the Luftwaffe returned Portsmouth and to the West Midlands on the night of the 11/12. KG 55 pitted its entire strength including Stab./KG 55 against Birmingham. The attack is notable as 5 staffel of II./KG 55 lost two He 111s to night fighters this night—Pilot Feldwebel Karl Brüning became a prisoner of war but his crew were killed by a Boulton Paul Defiant from No. 264 Squadron RAF flown by Flying Officer Frederick Hughes. Pilot Oberfeldwebel Karl Single was shot down by a No. 96 Squadron RAF Hawker Hurricane flown by Sergeant McNair, though three of his crew were killed. On 14/15 March KG 55 flew diversionary raids to Sheffield and Plymouth to allow other units to bomb Glasgow. One of its pathfinders fell to No. 604 Squadron RAF Bristol Beaufighter piloted by Flying Officer Keith Geddes. The growing efficiency of night fighters increased German bomber losses. On 10 April Major Rudolf Kiel took command of I. Gruppe from Hauptmann Otto Bodemeyer. Kiel led the group until 6 January 1943.

The last attacks were flown against Hull, Southampton, Avonmouth, London, Bristol, Clydeside and Devonport from 16 to 22 April; casualties amounted to two badly damaged Heinkels. KG 55 was selected for anti-shipping operations in the Irish Sea on 6 April 1941. Until 3 June it flew 73 operations and sank two ships, damaging another 12, for the loss of one bomber.

By the time KG 55 had ceased its actions over Britain, it had flown 4,742 sorties over the British Isles. 3,300 were against shipping and harbours, 700 against industrial targets, 391 armed reconnaissance flights and 350 attacks against airfields between 24 June 1940 and 11 June 1941. During its night operations, only 10 of KG 55's crews had been detected and engaged by enemy night fighters from September 1940–May 1941.

=== Eastern Front ===
KG 55's units began a last minute withdrawal to the Eastern borders of the Reich in preparation for Operation Barbarossa, the war on the Soviet Union. It was assigned to Fliegerkorps V (5th Flying Corps), subordinated to Luftflotte 4. The Stab. unit had six He 111s, all operational and two Messerschmitt Bf 110s, with one operational. I., III. Gruppe and the Geschwaderstab moved from their respective bases to Zamość in Poland, while II Gruppe was located to Klemensów aerodrome south east of Lublin in Poland under the command of Major Ernst Kühl, who assumed command on 31 March 1941. I./KG 55 had all 27 He 111s operational, II./KG 55 reported 22 of 24 bombers ready for action, and the third group 24 of 25 operational on 22 June 1941. On 8 March 1941 the Erganzungstaffel was formed into IV. Gruppe, but was deployed to Dijon in France and remained there until 4 May 1944. KG 55 was to provide air support for Army Group South attacking into Ukraine in its drive toward the Caucasus and the Soviet oil fields.

The opening day of the campaign resulted in the loss of seven aircraft. III. Gruppe attacked airfields at Łuck and Mlynow, near Dubno. The next day an 8./KG 55 Heinkel was shot down by flak over Łuck, the crew bailed out but were later found by advancing German forces to have been shot in the head. Two of the men were found at the local Commissar's house. II. Gruppe attacked airfields in L'vov, Adamy, near Busk, Ukraine, and Zalosy. III./KG 55 bombed airfields in Dubno and Kiev that morning. The Luftwaffe established a degree of air superiority after destroying and capturing over 4,000 Soviet aircraft in the first weeks of the invasion. II./KG 55 attacked airfield near Kiev again on 25 June while III. Gruppe bombed Red Army troop concentrations in Wlodzimierzec-Lutsk area on 23 June followed by bombing attacks on the Kowel-Sarny rail system on 25 June. By 25 June Fliegerkorps V bombed 77 airfields in the first three days, in 1,600 sorties. The air corps claimed 774 Soviet aircraft on the ground. Army reconnaissance units and the air corps lost 55 aircraft destroyed and 37 damaged.

On 26 June 1941 KG 55 was involved in the battles to support the 1st Panzer Army, operating against land-air forces belonging to the Soviet Western Front. Lacking dive-bomber, or strike aircraft, the air corps was forced to employ its medium bombers in the close support role. KG 51, KG 54 and KG 55 were forced to carry out continuous low-level attacks on counter-attacking Soviet army units. The operations were costly but relieved pressure on the Panzer Army. On 26 June an attack hit the headquarters of the Soviet 15th Mechanised Corps, wounding commander Major General Ignat Karpezo. The attacks inflicted serious delays on Soviet formations advancing from Kiev, the Red Army lost 201 tanks—mostly in front of the 1 Panzer Army from 22 June to 30 June. KG 55 registered 46 He 111s out of action—24 of them total losses. KG 51 lost 30 destroyed and nine damaged while KG 54 suffered 16 Junkers Ju 88s "out of action." Despite the losses, on 1 July, the three Geschwadern thwarted the Soviet retreat to Kiev, routing the infantry columns disengaging from the German 16th and 17th Armies. They reported 200 motor vehicles and 40 tanks destroyed.

In July the priority of KG 55 and all bomber units in Luftflotte 4 was railway interdiction in the Dnieper area. The dusty and ill-prepared roads were ill-suited to transporting large amounts of equipment and the Red Army relied on rail systems for logistics. The vast distances had an effect on escort fighter operations. The 1 Panzer Army seized Berdichev on 1 July after advancing 43 miles in three days. KG 55 was required to support it, but the forward airfield of JG 3, now at Lutsk, was out of range. The II. Gruppe proceeded and lost four bombers to Soviet fighters. I. Gruppe was also active, bombing rail and supply targets over the Dnieper between Kiev and Cherkassy. The group also attack rail and motor traffic between Zhitomir and Kiev. The Kiev–Korosten line was attacked on 5 July. Berdichev-Skvira (6 July) and Kiev rail station was bombed on 9 July. The group reverted to attacking Red Army columns south of Machnovka on 11 July. It moved from Labunie to Bojary on 20 July. From here, the group was part of the first raid on Moscow on 21/22 July 1941. Another transfer to Zhitomir on 25 July followed and it began operations against Drohobycz, southwest of L'vov on 26 July. It may have bombed Moscow again on the night of the 28 or 29 July.

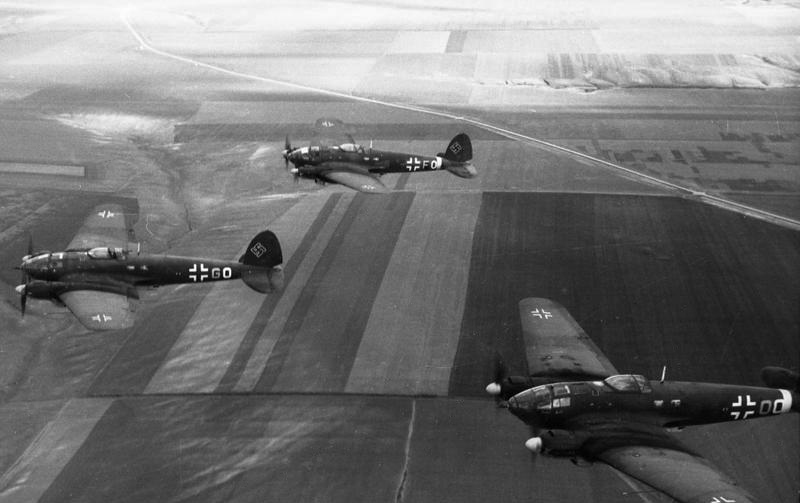
He 111s flying over the Steppe.

II. and III. Gruppen were also active in the area. After targeting Soviet tank concentrations near Leszniow on 26 June it did the same at Toporow and Berdichev airfield on 28 June. Road and rail traffic were bombed in the Vinnitsa-Zhitomir-Kiev from 1–6 July. Zhitomir-Zhmerinka and Novgrad, near Zhitomir were attacked on the 7 and 11 July. The group transferred to Mlynow in eastern Poland, then to Boyari northeast of Minsk. From here it began bombing operations with incendiary bombs against Moscow on 22 July. It was ordered to target the Kremlin—the Soviet seat of government. It bombed Bryansk rail station on 30 July. III. Gruppe appears to have been ordered to attack bridges at Kanev (11 July). Korosten (16 July), Moscow (21/22 July), Zhitomir (22 July).

The Geschwader played an instrumental role in the Battle of Kiev and Battle of Uman, in which the Wehrmacht effectively destroyed three Soviet armies, killing or capturing 600,000 soldiers. I./KG 55 was credited with the destruction of 58 railway cars, 675 trucks and 22 tanks in this battle alone. On 7 August, near, Dnepropetrovsk, a Soviet counter-attack pushed back the 1st Panzer Army from its Dnieper bridgehead. All available aircraft were sent to stop the attack. KG 55, KG 54 and KG 51 were credited with the destruction of 148 motor vehicles and 94 tanks.

3. Staffel pilot Adalbert Karbe destroyed seven locomotives in one sortie. I. Gruppe attacked the pocket around Uman from 3–10 August. It also bombed Lubny airfield on 3 August. Sablonow (12 August) and Kiev (29 August) were attacked from new bases near Kirovograd (from 27 August). The group bombed airfields around Kharkov on 6 and 8 September and then bombed the Poltava rail line. It probably bombed Poltava airfield on 28 August. The group continued operations against, Dnepropetrovsk and Karlovka on 18 September. It bombed targets inside Kharkov on 25 September.

II. Gruppe bombed Gomel and flew sorties in support of the advance on Nezhin. The group attacked the rail station on 20 August. In the Chabnoye area (22 and 24 August) and Oster, near Kiev (24 August) it flew armed reconnaissance operations. It reconnoitered the Dnepropetrovsk area on 2 September. It attacked Kirovograd rail targets on 1 September. For most of September it attacked rail traffic travelling from Kharkov to Poltava. It targeted Korsun, east of Kiev on 10 September and the airfield at Semenovka on the 12th. Kharkov train station was attacked on 21 September and then the Kharkov-Kupyansk, and Kharkov-Belgorod until the 25 September. On 22 September KG 55 attacked the eastward road out of Kharkov just as the 558th and 596th Anti-tank Regiments. Such was the flow of Soviet reinforcement in the south, Luftflotte 4 diverted KG 55 specifically interdiction. Rolling stock and locomotives were the target. Individual crews were sent out on free-hunts to cover the huge area between Kursk and Stalino. A supplementary MG 151 cannon was added to the nose for low-level attacks. The operations were so successful, the Soviets resorted to sending transports by night.

The most notable action for this group was the First Battle of Kharkov. On 17 October it bombed rail traffic on the Kupyansk-Valuyki on 17 October and the Kharkov-Volchansk road on 20th. Rail targets in Melitopol (27 October), Rostov (3 November) and Svoboda (12 November) were bombed as a prelude to an advance on Rostov. The group was withdrawn to Saint-André-de-l'Eure Airport, France prior to the battle proper. It remained there until April 1942. III. Gruppe remained and bombed the tank factory at Kramatorskaya on 6 October. On 16 and 18 October it bombed targets around Rostov and Kharkov. It was moved to the Crimea and bombed the port of Kerch on 30 October and then Rostov on the 5 November. On 30 November it flew its last operation in 1941 and withdrew to Nantes until 29 April 1942. First Group was also withdrawn, from Kirovograd, and sent to Vienna to refit. On 18 November it was moved to Melun in France until 31 December 1941.

=== Case Blue, Caucasus and Stalingrad ===
The Red Army counter-offensive before Moscow nearly destroyed Army Group Centre and by late December 1941, early January 1942, it had come to a halt. German offensive operations came to an end along the Eastern Front: Barbarossa had failed. Stab KG 55 was reassigned from the command of Fliegerkorps IV to IX Fliegerkorps. It was moved to Évreux-Fauville Air Base, along with the rest of KG 55. It was reduced to three aircraft on 7 March 1942. On 24 April 1942, KG 55 came under the command of VIII Fliegerkorps. The bomber wing was immediately transferred to the Crimea. In December 1941 Soviet forces landed in the Crimea near Kerch, and KG 55, along with KG 27, KG 55, and KG 100, was dispatched to assist Luftflotte 4 and the 11th Army to destroy the Soviet beachhead in April 1942. KG 55 had immediate success, damaging the Soviet destroyer Sposobnyy and scoring hits on the cruiser Frunze for one bomber loss to Soviet fighters.

I. Gruppe was the only exception. It moved back to southern Russia on 1 January 1942 from Melun-Villaroche. The group attacked rail targets in Millerovo, 6 January 1942; Vladislavaka (15 January) and attacked anti-aircraft artillery batteries along Petropavlovka, and Alexandrovska on 16 January. Targets in the Izyum-Slavyansk-Lozovaya salient southeast of Kharkov were bombed in late January and close air support operations were flown over Feodosia (31 January) and Barvenovka (13 February). Rail targets between Blisnjesy and Barvenovka (21 February), Kirovograd to Konotop (27 February), Izyum (9 March), and Valuyki, east of Kharkov on 10 March. The Izyum-Slavyansk-Lozovaya salient on 18 March. It operated over the Sea of Azov, disrupting shipping bringing in reinforcements. The last known operation flown in this area was rail interdiction: the line between Kirovograd to Konotop was targeted once again. From the 8–15 May, it was directed to support Erich von Manstein's army group in the Crimea, Operation Trappenjagd (Bustard-Hunt): attacks on Dzhankoi, Bagerovo, Kerch and the Sea of Azov were carried out on 10 May. One He 111 from the group was subjected to a Taran attack. On 15 May, the Gruppe was withdrawn to Stalino. The group damaged the minesweeper Komintern and sank a transport ship on 21 April and by this time the Black Sea Fleets ability to supply the Soviet forces in Sevastopol was severely curtailed. The ports of Anapa, Tuapse, and Novorossiysk were bombed.

II. and III. Gruppen were involved in the Crimean campaign. II./KG 55 attacked Red Army columns along the Marayevka-Kerch road on 10 May and five days later it had been withdrawn to support German forces in the Izyum-Kupyansk region. On 19 May it flew airdrop operations in the Kharkov area. III Gruppe bombed targets in and around Kerch from 8–10 May. On the latter date it lost five He 111s in combat. KG 55 lost eight in total this day: Manstein noted, "Richthofen made terrific demands on the units under his command." It relocated to Izyum-Kupyansk sector for Operation Fridericus. KG 55's operations in the Crimea came to an end. The campaign would end with the fall of Sevastopol in July 1942. On 11 June 1942, KG 55 flew its 15,839th sortie.

In May 1942 KG 55 was rushed northward to combat a Soviet offensive at Kharkov under the command of Fliegerkorps IV. I. Gruppe experienced Soviet air resistance almost immediately. Kapitan Ivan Pilipenko led six Polikarpov I-16s from 40 IAP and shot down three He 111s. The KG 55 war diary noted "Russian fighters had rarely appeared in such force as they had over this sector of the front." III. Gruppe flew an average of 49 sorties per day, dropping 7.75 tons of bombs between 13 and 17 May. Days after the conclusion of Kharkov, KG 55 were involved in Operation Wilhelm against Volchansk, supporting the German 6. Armee's advance to capture the city and secure a staging area for Case Blue, the German summer offensive aimed and capturing the Caucasus oilfields. Kurt Pflugbeil, commanding IV Fliegerkorps, ordered KG 55 and his bomber groups to support Army Group A's advance to the Don river. The capture of Rostov allowed the German army group to advance into the northern Caucasus. Bridges, rail and road transport—operational level interdiction—targets were KG 55's quarry. At this early stage in Case Blue, the Luftfwaffe had air superiority. III./LG 1, KG 51, and I./KG 100 supported KG 55. ZG 1 offered close air support and JG 52 and JG 53 provided fighter escort and air cover.

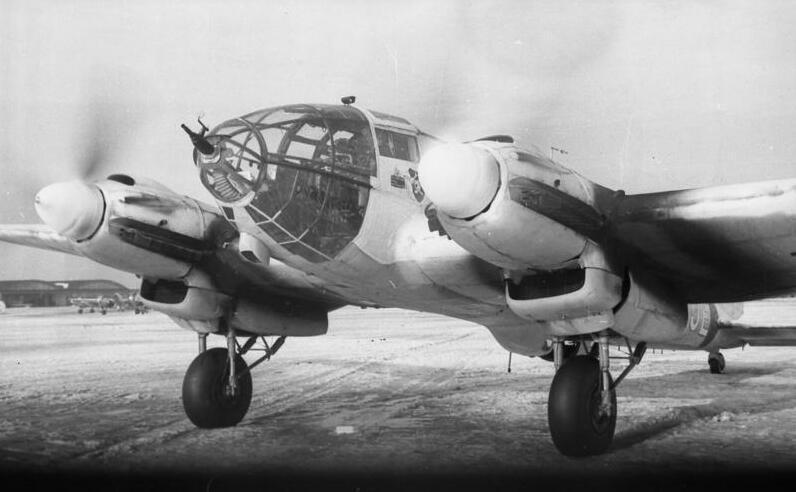
He 111 in Russia, January 1943

I. Gruppe had 30 He 111H-6s ready for action on 1 July. Ostrogoshsk was attacked on 4 July and it moved from Kharkov to Barvenovka on 8 July. The group began attacks on Stalingrad on 16 August, well before German spearheads reached the city. II./KG 55 mustered 33 bombers for the offensive. Bombing operations over Starobelsk on 10 July was followed by a move to Kramatorskaya on 14 July. Luganskoye was bombed on 14 July and then it targeted Soviet oil tankers and other transports moving along the Volga river. It was then transferred to the Crimea and attacked Novorossisk (10 August) and bombed rail lines around Tupase (18 August). It returned to Morosovskaya. III. Gruppe was attacking targets around Bulazelovka (10 June), Grakovo (12 June) and destroyed a bridge at Kupyansk on 22 June. Svoboda rail station was bombed on 25 and 27 June. It reported to still have 30 He 111s on 1 July. It moved eastward from Kharkov to Kramatorskaya on 14 July. It detached 9. Staffel to operate from Kerch over the Black Sea. 7. and 8. Staffel raided traffic on the Volga on 31 July. From 24 to 31 July 1942 it flew an average of 23 sorties per day and dropped 29 tons of bombs. The group moved to Samorsk in the eastern Crimea altogether on 5 August and began support for German forces in the Caucasus. On 17 August it targeted the Temryuk area on the Taman Peninsula and two days later, Tuapse harbour. On 23 August, it bombed rail communications from Saratov to Astrakhan.

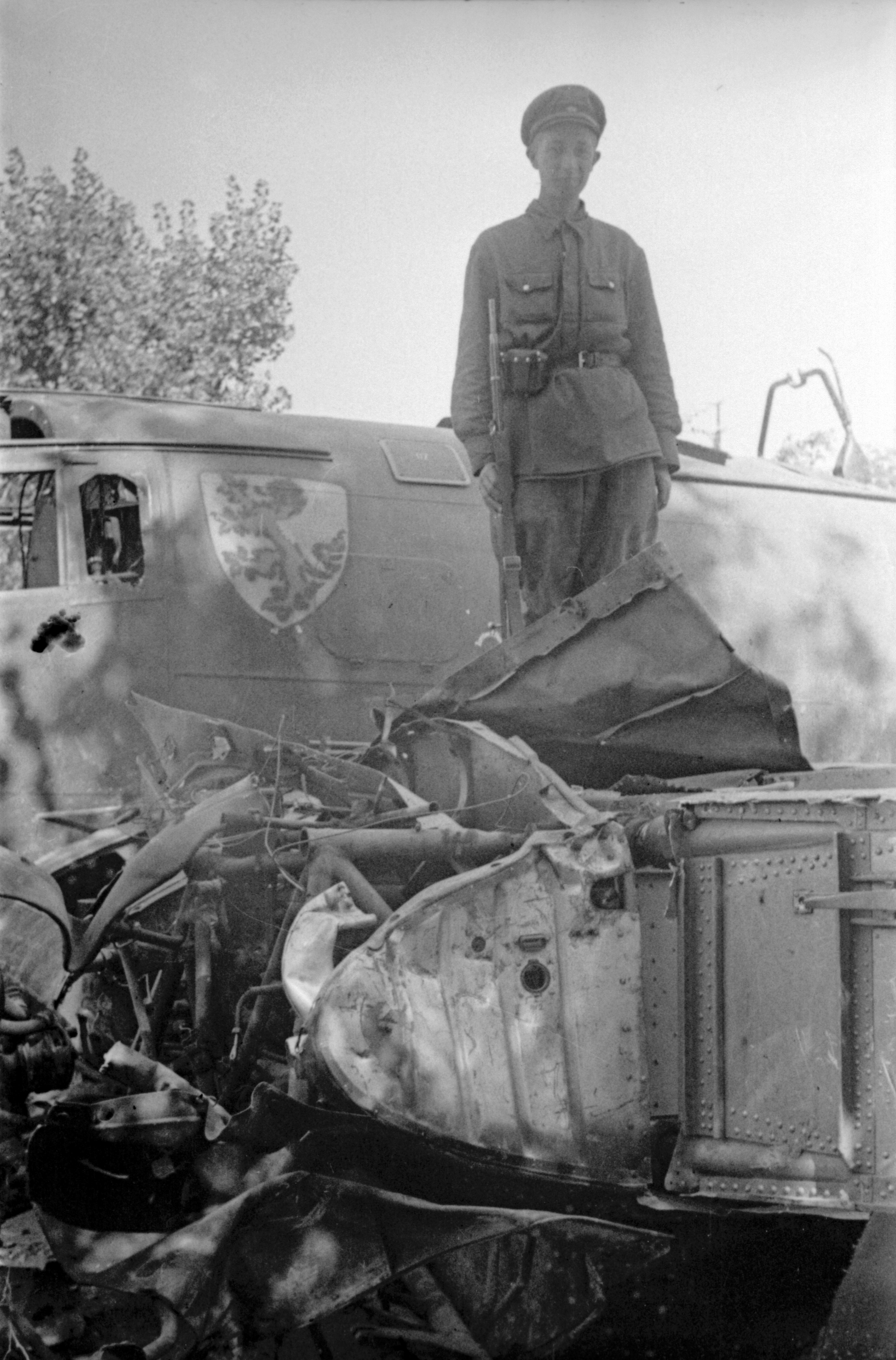
A Soviet soldier stands guard over an He 111 of KG 55 shot down over Stalingrad, 1942

The Battle of Stalingrad began on 23 August 1942. KG 55 was heavily involved in the bombing of the city—both carpet bombing and targeted bombing at specific targets. Beginning at 07:00 local time on 23 August, the bombing began. It lasted throughout the night and into the following day. More than 1000 metric tons of bombs were dropped by Luftflotte 4. The following day the intensity continued into the evening of the 25 August. Initial Soviet reported the water and electricity grid knocked out. On 26 August a detailed Soviet Urban Committee of Defence report gave the following casualty figures; 955 dead and 1,181 wounded. Due to the fighting that followed and the high death toll, it is impossible to know how many more were killed in aerial attacks. The figure was higher than in the initial reports but reports of tens of thousands of deaths in the three-day raid are not credible.

KG 55 suffered declining strength in the Stalingrad battle. I./KG 55 was sent to rest and refit in the Crimea on 14 September, which lasted until 5 November 1942. By 20 September it reported only 15 operational He 111s from 29. Part of the group may have flown attacks on Stalingrad on 29 October. II./KG 55 reported identical figures on 20 September. It attacked the city on 4 October and bombed the Gashti area on 22 October. On 17 November 1942 it flew attacks in the Romanian Army sector; supporting its Third and Fourth elements. III./KG 55 are known to have attacked the city on 30 August and 18, 21, 22 and 23 September. It had a marginally higher operational ready rate on 20 September; 19 from 31 He 111s were battle-ready. It was known to have continued bombing the city from 2–22 October 1942. Third group flew 288 day bombing missions from 28 September–24 October 1942, dropping 2490.25 tonnes of bombs; the majority being short-range missions. A further ten long-range missions were flown and 12.5 tonnes of bombs were dropped.

The Red Army began Operation Uranus, which eventually surrounded the Axis armies in the city. I./KG 55 attacked targets around Stalingrad from 21 to 24 November: Kletskaya (21 and 22 November), Perelasovskiy 923 November), Seyasnovskiy (24 November), Tschemiskaya and Seyasnovskiy (25 November). Flew supply operations 29 November, 8, 12, 19 and 24 December. It bombed targets at Myupin on Christmas Day 1942. It evacuated to Novocherkassk to avoid being overrun on 2 January 1943. It was forced to limit operations to one aircraft per day in January and flew supply missions to Gumrak airfield on 20 January, and flew its last drop over Stalingrad on 30 January. The group evacuated to Stalino on 2 February—the day the battle ended.

On 20 November II./KG 55 bombed Soviet armour near Kletskaya northwest of Stalingrad. It attacked targets in the Cherny-Sevskaya region on 26 November. It operated from Pitomnik Airfield until 29 November and over Pitomnik on 7 December. There are no recorded losses after this date suggesting records were lost or it was re-equipping. On 20 November KG 55 lost Gruppenkommandeur Hans-Joachim Gabriel in operations over the city. He was the only commander of the group to be killed in action. Major Heinz Höfer. III./KG 55 began supply missions on 30 December, to Pitomnik. It evacuated the field on 2 January and flew its last supply operation on 18 January, and withdrew to Stalino on 2 February 1943.

The Germans resisted fiercely but on 14 January 1943 Pitomnik airfield was captured by the Soviets and many supplies were then parachuted in. The last German elements surrendered on 2 February. KG 55 contributed only a small fraction of the meagre 90 tonnes of supplies the 6th Army received daily. Over 165 He 111's were lost over Stalingrad, KG 55's losses were 59. The Geschwader flew in 3,296 tons of supplies including 1,541 tons of food and 768 tons of ammunition, and 1,110 tons of fuel. KG 55 also evacuated 9,028 wounded soldiers.

=== Third Kharkov, Crimea and Strategic bombing ===
KG 55 remained on the Eastern Front in through the spring, 1943 over the Donbas and Kuban bridgehead. The wing was transferred to Fliegerkorps IV in April. Stab./KG 55 was based at Saki at this time but moved forward to Stalino on 1 May. I Gruppe struck targets at Bataisk (9 February). The following day the Red Air Force bombed the group's base. It carried out unspecified operations over Kramatorskaya (15 February), Stefanovka and Gulobovka (19 February) and Politodeiskoye (28 February). On 1 March it could muster 16 He 111H-16s and 19 He 111H-6s. It handed over its aircraft to the other two Gruppen and then relocated by train to Barth, Germany to rest and re-equip. The personnel there were renamed III./LG 1 on 1 May 1943. The group was reformed on 10 June at Stalino from personnel taken from the Transportfliegergruppe 10, and K.Gr.z.b.V.5. It transferred to Wiesbaden on 20 May, and Landsberg-Lech on 29 August 1943. It briefly flew night reconnaissance missions over northeastern Italy, searching possible invasion routes for Operation Achse, in the event the Italians left the Axis powers. The group did not fly a combat sortie in the Mediterranean. The reconstituted group was placed under the command of Walter Traub, from 1 May.

II./KG 55 began airdrops to the Taman Peninsula and Armavir-Krasnodar area in February 1943 based at Saki. It had only seven He 111H-6s on 13 February. It began to re-equip with H-16s on 1 March and then attacked Bataisk with the new type on 11 April. More bombing operations against the port of Novorossik (15 April) and anti-aircraft artillery positions at Labardinka (18 April) as well as targets along the Taman Peninsular from 27 April to 4 May. From Stalino it flew more attacks against Bataisk on 9 May. The group flew its 10,000th mission on 11 May 1943. It returned to Taman (26 May), Krymaskaya (27 May), targets Krasnodar (30 May). It moved to the central sector at Sechchinskaya and Karachev. III. Gruppe spent the new year and spring supporting defensive operations around Taman, Rostov and Anastasiyevka (7–22 February) and its own base was bombed (7 February). On 23 February the group moved to Kirovograd to support Manstein's offensive at Kharkov until 14 March. On 18 March it bombed Belgorod and relocated back to Kirovograd to Samorsk in Crimea for operations over the Taman Peninsular from 5 April. Major Wilhelm Antrup took command on 6 May from Oberstleutnant Wolfganag Queisner. Operations southwest of Krymskaya (3 and 4 May), Tikhoretsk-Kratpotkin (16 May), Russkaya (25 May), Krymskaya (26 May) and an attack on Krapotkin train station followed on 28 May. On 30 May the group flew its last operation before flying north to take part in Operation Citadel at Seshchinskaya.

Before the offensive began against Soviet armies protecting the bulge in the line at Kursk, II. and III. Gruppen took part in a strategic bombing operation in June 1943. The Chief of the General Staff Hans Jeschonnek and his operations staff officer Rudolf Meister were major proponents of an attack on industrial sectors. The command staff of the Luftwaffe used this idea to free their service from the air support role. Robert Ritter von Greim's Luftflotte 6, with support from KG 55's Luftflotte 4, was assigned seven bomber wings to carry out the offensive—KG 55, KG 3, KG 4, KG 27, KG 51, KG 53 and KG 100. Even Wolfram Freiherr von Richthofen, the leading ground-support exponent, agreed to the operation. It was felt the Luftwaffe could render greater assistance to the army this way. The planners focused on targets that were in range of the He 111-equipped Geschwader.

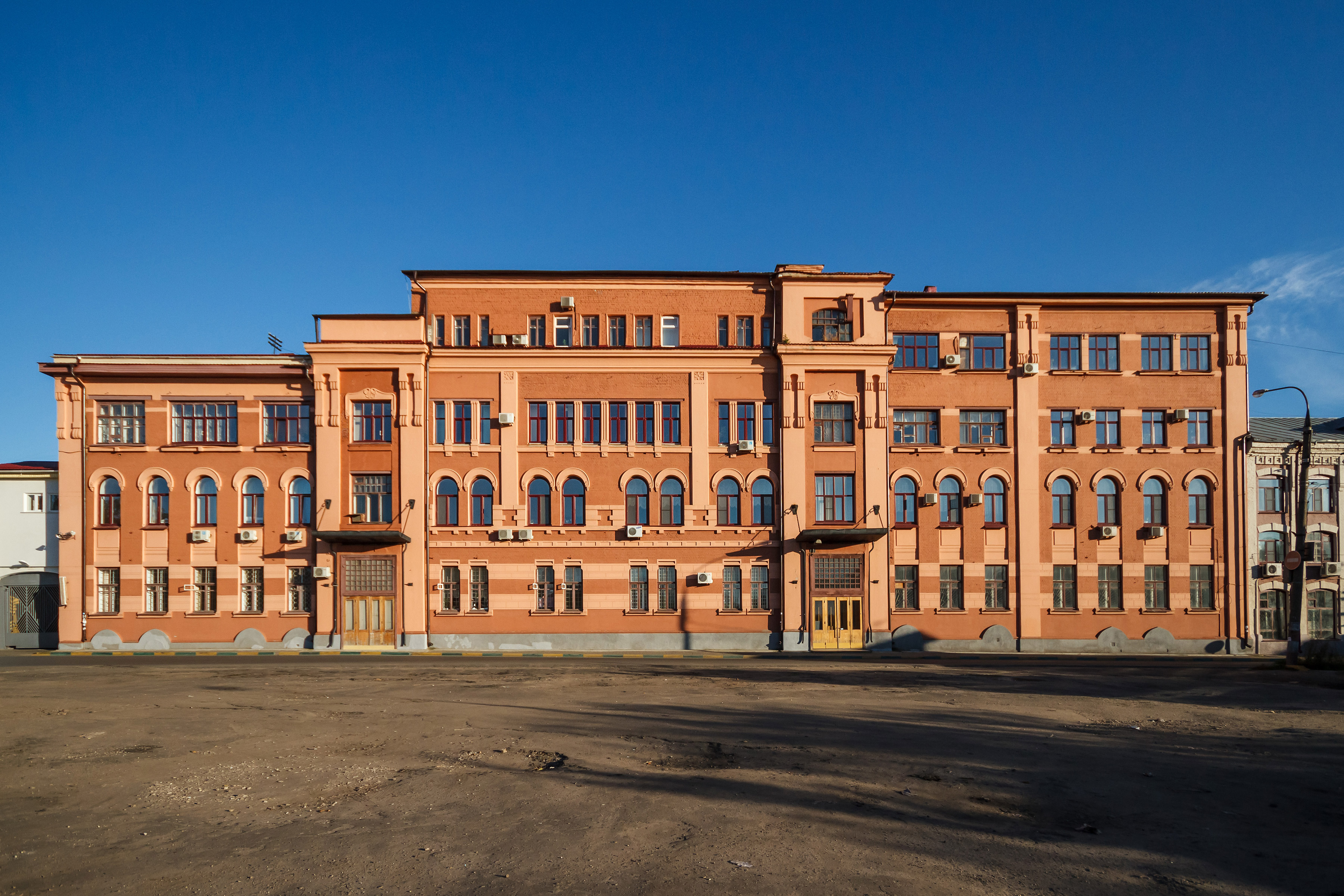
Entrance to Krasnoye Sormovo Factory No. 112 at Gorkiy: one of KG 55's targets (2015)

Factory Number 24, at Kuybyshev Oblast produced a quarter of all aviation engines in the Soviet Union and 85 percent of all Ilyushin Il-2 engines, Factory Number 26 at Ufa, with 31 percent of total production and 60 percent of all fighter aircraft engine production, Factory Number 16 at Kazan, producing 12 percent of the total and 60 percent of all medium bomber aircraft engines, Factory Number 45, in Moscow, with five percent total but 15 percent of IL-2 engines, and finally Factory Number No. 466 at Gorkiy with five percent total and one-tenth of all fighter engine production were the targets. Three of the five ball bearings plants were in range, the synthetic rubber plant at Yaroslavl (23 percent of output) and oil refineries along with steel plants were all considered. Surviving intelligence maps show the crude oil and ball bearing plant at Saratov was also considered. In the end phase, the production of tanks and armoured vehicles received the weight of the attacks. The facilities at Gorkiy drew most attention for it produced 15 percent of T-34s and was the largest plant west of the Urals. In error, planners targeted the State Motor Vehicles Plant No. 1 Molotov, the largest automobile plant in the country which produced the less threatening T-60 and T-70. The Krasnoye Sormovo Factory No. 112 was targeted because of its production of munitions.

On 4 June 1943 the operation began. Although the night was moonlit, KG 55 utilised the Radio Moscow frequencies as a navigational aid. Soviet retaliation occurred in the form of counter-air raids against its airfield on 8 and 18 June. II. Gruppe took part in the bombing operation against rail lines at Kursk on 2 June. From 4 June it participated in the attacks on the tank factory at Gorki, the refineries and ball bearings at Saratov as well as Yaroslavl. The 4/5 June operation was carried out by 128 He 111s and Junkers Ju 88 from III./KG 1, KG 3, II. and III./KG 4, KG 27, I./KG 100 and II. and III./KG 55 dropped 179 tons of bombs against the No. 1 Molotov plant. Many workshops of wooden construction caught fire. The water-supply was severed and large parts of the plant burned. The blacksmiths, chassis, main conveyor, and spring workshops were destroyed. Living compounds and a child's nursery were also hit. The effect was disastrous for the Soviets. The attackers lost five bombers. The Soviet 1st Air Army, 2nd Air Army and 15th Air Army attacked German airfields on 8 June. JG 51 intercepted, and claimed 40 for one loss.

The Luftwaffe returned to attack the repair workshops over two subsequent nights with a force of 300 bombers. During repeated attacks between 4 and 22 June, all of the plant's 50 buildings, 9,000 metres of conveyors, 5,900 units of process equipment and 8,000 engines were destroyed or damaged. Russian authorities have still not disclosed how many people were killed. German wartime estimates are 15,000, but are not supported. Owing to failed intelligence and targeting, the attacks against the Molotov factory disrupted the T-70 light tank. Roughly half of the Soviet light tank production—5, 134 from 9, 375 in 1942, was made there. Factory Number 112, produced the T-34 tank, which was only lightly affected by the raids. Repair was rapid, and completed within six weeks. Night fighter and search light defences were also increased. The factory was fully operational by 18 August. In the fourth quarter of 1943, it superseded production quotas by 121 percent. Factory Number 112 went on to produce 2,851 T-34s in 1943 and 3, 619 in 1944 up from 2, 718 in 1942. The He 111 units dropped 1,015 tons of bombs in total, losing only six aircraft, through the Soviets claimed 145.

KG 55 reverted to rail interdiction against the Kantemirovka and Rossosh regions on 11 June. On the 13 June the Gruppe flew its 10,000th mission (7, 680 in Russia). It returned to bombing Saratov on the night of the 14/15 June 1943. 9. Staffel equipped with the Ju 88C-6, and attacked rail targets for the remainder of June. The 9 and 20 June bombing of Yaroslavl was carried out by 102 and 88 bombers respectively dropped 324 tons of bombs. Against Saratov, from 12 to 15 June, the German bombers dropped 181 tons. The raid by 138 He 111s on 9/10 June cost the Germans three bombers. Losses mounted as the Soviet night fighters took advantage of brighter summer nights. On 13/14 June attack, 20/21 June raid, 21/22 June, one bomber (KG 27), six (one from KG 3, two from KG 1 and three from KG 27) were lost. One KG 55 bomber barely evaded an attack by a night fighter.

=== Kursk to Bagration ===
KG 55 was based near Kharkov from 21 June with II./JG 3 and II./JG 52 for fighter support. The Stab, II. and III. Gruppen were ordered to support the southern advance of Operation Citadel, mainly to be executed by the 4th Panzer Army and the II SS Panzer Corps. KG 55 was still placed under the command of Luftflotte 4. It was opposed in the coming battle by the powerful 2nd Air Army, in turn, supported by 17th Air Army.

On 5 July 1943 II./KG 55 carried out attacks against Soviet positions with Butterfly Bombs. A they bombed Gremuchiy and Gostishchevo, which the 51st Guards Rifle Division held from the 3rd SS Panzer Division Totenkopf, 12 Yak-1 fighters from the 27 IAP and 10 Lavochkin La-7s from 41 GAP attacked and shot down two Heinkels, and damaged a third. The SS unit managed to take the first objective. From 5, 8 and 9 July it bombed targets around Belgorod. II./KG 55 flew two missions on the 9 July and lost at least one bomber and one damaged in combat with Soviet fighters and after being engaged by strong anti-aircraft fire. Its own bases were targeted on 18 and 20 July. The group bombed Marinovka on 24 July, before relocating to Dnepropetrovsk on 6 August 1943. Beevka (7 August), Surkaya-Kamensk (17 August), and targets in and around Kalinovka (20 August) were carried out as the Red Army embarked on the Belgorod-Khar'kov Offensive Operation.

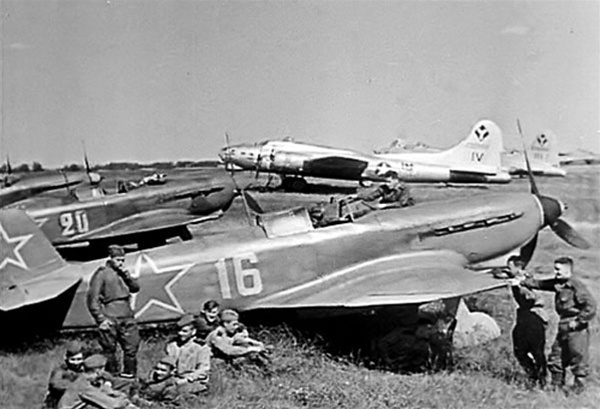
USAAF B-17 Flying Fortresses and Yakovlev Yak-9 fighters, 1944. KG 55 targeted Operation Frantic.

III. Gruppe were also active but less is known about their operations. On 6 July it struck at Kharkov-Rohan, Novo-Donbad on 17 July, moved to Dnepropetrovsk 4 August, to Zaporozhye 25 August. It carried out attacks on Belgorod on 6 August Narodok (7 August), Belgorod again (9 August), Svoboda (18 August) and particularly heavy air attacks on Kuibyshevo in Volgograd Oblast, from 20 to 31 August 1943. The group moved to Stalino against on 28, 29 August. It bombed Federovka on 31 August. Major Alfred Bollmann succeeded Antrup to become the last commander of the group on 8 August 1943.

I./KG 55 returned to the Eastern Front in mid-August and joined the other two Gruppen at Dnepropetrovsk, perhaps on the 26th day. The three bomber formations continued to offer support to Army Group South as it lost ground in Ukraine. In the third week of August the Battle of the Dnieper began, and ended before Christmas 1943. In the offensive the Axis lost control of Left-bank Ukraine. I Gruppe began bombing operations almost immediately, attacking Pokorovo two days later. The moving frontlines necessitated a retreat to Zaporozhye to Kirovograd on 12 September 1943. From here it was in action over Izyum (23 September) and Nikopol on the (24 September). Further withdrawals from Kirovograd to Nikolayev and Beresovka, north northeast of Odessa were made by 20 October. During the course of October, the group operated over the Kerch Straits, possibly against shipping in the Black Sea and Sea of Azov. Part of it moved there in November. It probably assisted German forces in the Kuban bridgehead. By 1 December it could only field 20 He 111H-16s. It was moved to Terespol on 8 December and to Dęblin in Poland for rest and replacement on 27 December.

II and III. Gruppen followed a similar pattern. II./KG 55 retreated from Dnepropetrovsk Kirovograd on 15 September and saw operations in the Zaporozhye-Nikopol area (12 October) and Lichovka (21 October). Annovka-Petrovo was bombed on 30 October. There were no reported losses from 1–24 November and the group returned to Annovka on 24 November. It was based southeast of Uman on 28 November and could muster 22 He 111s (20 He 111H-16s). It moved to Dęblin on the 4 December 1943 for rest and refit. III. Gruppe flew many missions from Dnepropetrovsk to Melitopol and Zaporozhye from the 23 September–3 October. It retreated from Kirovograd (22 October) and flew bombing sorties near Perekop on 24 October. In November 1943 it flew sorties in the Kerch–Eltigen Operation until 2 December. It was withdrawn to Terespol with its remaining aircraft—18 H-11s and H-11/R1s and 12 H-16s.

KG 55 returned to the frontline in January 1944. From here on, with a few exceptions, it was used primarily in the night intruder and air-supply role. I./KG 55 trained after refitting as a night strategic bomber force under the command of IV Fliegerkorps from January to March 1944. From 31 March to 7 April it was utilised to airdrop containers to the 1st Panzer Army, under the command of Hans-Valentin Hube. The German formation was trapped in the Kamenets-Podolsky pocket. The following night it struck rail targets at Fastov, southwest of Kiev. On 10 April it bombed Korosten marshalling yards and then at rail junctions, Rovno, Kiev and Shepetovka from 4–11 May 1944. The German defeat in the Crimea on 12 May, necessitated aircraft to evacuate personnel and KG 55 was called in to do so from 11 to 15 May, operating from Focsani, Romania.It transferred to Dęblin on 16 May, but had 35 He 111 H-16s on strength on 1 June 1944.

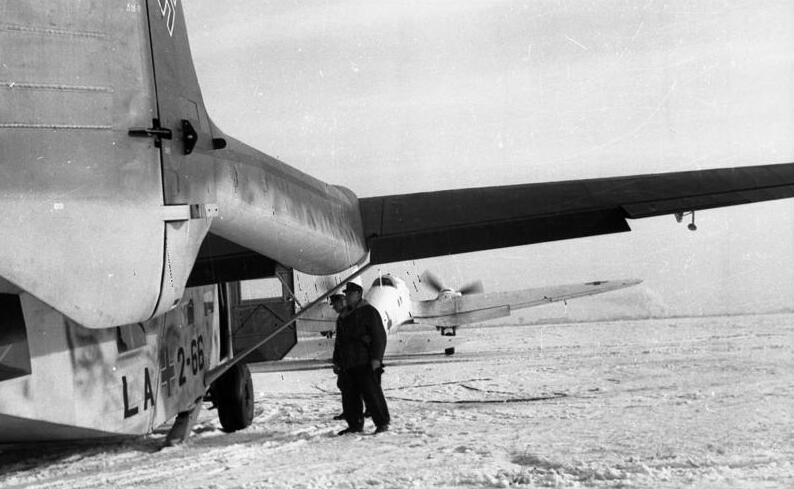
He 111 on supply operations. a supply Gotha Go 242 is being attached to it.

II Gruppe also trained for long-range operations under the command of IV Fliegerkorps. It was brought up to strength with 35 H-16s at Dęblin: where it remained based until 10 May 1944. It trained from January to March 1944. From 31 March to 7 April 1944, it dropped supplies to the Kovel pocket, and rendered support to the 5th SS Panzer Division Wiking. It flew rail interdiction; bombing yards at Rovno, Kiev and Shepetovka from 4–11 May. It joined I Gruppe at Focsani in Romania to evacuate the Crimea, from 11 to 16 May 1944. It moved back to Dęblin but the fuel crisis now prevalent in the Luftwaffe, slowed down the pace of operations. On 21/22 June, with I. and III. Gruppen, it bombed Poltava Air Base, which housed United States Army Air Force bombers that had been flying shuttle-missions to Eastern Europe and landing in the Soviet Union. The raid caused significant losses to the US Fifteenth Air Force. A Heinkel He 177 from 2./Aufklärungsgruppe 100 shadowed the 3rd Bombardment Division, 45th Bombardment Wing to Poltava. The raid, carried out by KG 55, KG 53, KG 27 and KG 4, destroyed 43 B-17 Flying Fortress' damaged 26, and destroyed 200,000 US gallons of aviation fuel.

All three group flew as bomber formations against the Soviet summer offensive, Operation Bagration. Luftflotte 6, to which KG 55 was attached, deployed the unit on the central sector supporting Army Group Centre. It had 107 Heinkel He 111s on 26 June, with stab./KG 55 possessing a single bomber. I./KG 55 used 35 in night operations in support of Army Group North over Lithuania. It flew night attacks and some supply mission from 23 June–4 July. By 27 July it had retreated to Tonndorf, southwest of Bydgoszcz. It converted to H-20 models and flew missions against the Lvov–Sandomierz Offensive and bridges across the Vistula, near Warsaw and was based at Baranów Sandomierski, from 28 July–12 August 1944. In late August it left for Bavaria, Germany. There it had 31 He 111s (25 H-20s). It moved to Straubing, in September and was renamed I./KG(J) 55 and began converting to a fighter unit on 1 October.

II./KG 55 flew combat operations over Bobruisk-Sloboda-Minsk in support of Army Group Centre. From later June, and for several weeks, it flew night bombing raids on Smolensk, 28/29 June 1944. It left Dęblin for Inowroclaw on 26 July. It could still muster 35 bombers by 26 June and bombed targets at Molodechno, northwest of Minsk on 23 July. The raids cost KG 55 five bombers on 5 July which took the total to 14 destroyed in just six days of action from 29 June. Attacks on the Vistula bridges at Warsaw and Baranów Sandomierski followed from 1–12 August. Its force was reduced to 31 He 111H-16s by 1 September. It withdrew to Germany to carry out air-supply flights to German Garrisons in isolated French ports from 10 to 12 September after Operation Overlord and Battle for Normandy, and liberated the bulk of France and Belgium over June–September 1944. From Hohensalza it transferred to Zellhausen, where it was disbanded and reformed into fighter unit II.KG(J) 55 on 1 October 1944.

III. Gruppe also trained for long-range night operations. It flew on operations to supply the Kowel pocket along with the other Gruppen. On the night of the 7/8 April 1944 it bombed Kiev, and Kowel on 15/16 April. Velikaya Luki (21 April), Rowne, Kiev, and Shepetovka (4–11 May), Velikaya Luki (24 May) were attacked before it withdrew to Podlokowka in Poland on 25 May. With 34 He 111s it bombed Kazatin (1 June) and also Mirgorod on (11 June). It participated in the raids against the USAAF at Poltava. Bobruisk-Sloboda-Minsk regions were bombed and supplied after the 22 June. Bobruisk was the main target from 29 to 30 June. On 21 July it retreated to Glinnik, Poland. Operations were curtailed because of aviation fuel shortages. Vistula bridges at Warsaw and Baranów Sandomierski were attacked from 1–12 August and it followed the other Gruppen to Zellhausen, Germany on 19 August for air supply operations to France. It had 30 He 111s by 1 September, but on the 19th was probably disbanded and reformed as III./KG(J) 55 on 1 October.

Luftwaffe records reveal the unit had flown 54,272 combat sorties, dropped 60,938 tons of bombs, carried 7,514 tons of supplies, and lost 710 killed and 747 missing from 1 September 1939 to 1 October 1944.

=== Defeat: 1945 ===
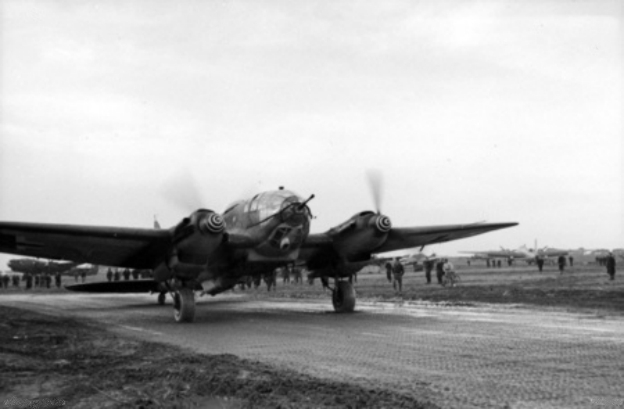
He 111H-16, with multiple forward-facing MG 151 cannon. This aircraft is similar to those flown by 14.(Eis)/KG 55.

The only active unit after October 1944 was IV. Gruppe, which continued operations in the west from 1940 to 1945. It was initially formed as Ergänzungsstaffel at Chatres, France on 1 April 1940, its earliest known designation being Ausbildungsstaffel at Ulm-Dornstadt. On 30 September 1940 the group transferred to Landsberg. By 8 March it had expanded into IV.(Erg)/KG 55, with 10 and 11 Staffeln. On 7 April 12 Staffel was added at Longvic near Dijon, France. From March 1941–May 1944 it was involved in night attacks on Britain and training.

10. Staffel bombed Hull on 26 April 1942. It took part in bombing raids against Birmingham on 27–31 July 1942. It had 26 bombers, including six and three of the P-2s and P-4 variants by 1 March 1943. 13 Staffel was formed at Gerdauen in East Prussia on 1 March 1944 after three years of training activities near Dijon. The Gruppe moved to Heuhausen to avoid attacks by Allied aircraft on 4/5 May 1944. It moved to Szolnok, Hungary to avoid advancing Soviet forces on 1 August. On 20 August the Fifteenth US Air Force bombed the base killing six and wounded 18 personnel. It had 34 bombers on 1 September which it evacuated to Pilsen, Czechoslovakia on 1 and 2 September. The Gruppe lost its identity on 21 November 1944 with 12. and 13. Staffeln and renamed 4. and 3. respectively of Erg.Gr.(J), and 10. and 11. Staffeln disbanded, under the command of IX Fliegerkorps. IV. Gruppe would lose 50 aircraft in the west before the end of the war.

14.(Eis)/KG 55 (Eis—Eisenbahn, the anti train unit) remained the only independent unit of KG 55 to remain on bomber operations into 1945. It was officially formed at Dnepropetrovsk on 1 June 1943 using experienced crews from 9 Staffel. It appears some of the unit personnel were in action earlier, as on 28 May an entry was made for the squadron's first loss on a bombing operation against Krapotkin train station in the northern Caucasus. The unit's main purpose was to use cannon-armed He 111s to attack locomotives.

It attacked rail lines south of Rossoh on 11 June. It moved to Poltava on 29 June and then to Kirovograd on 9 August. It attacked these targets Borovaya on 10 August and Avdeyevka on 18 August. It moved to Pervomaisk-Golta on 22 October, and listed 12 machines (H-16s) on 1 January 1944. It moved to Pskov, on Army Group North's front from 13 February 1944. After its move the staffel had the loosest connection to the rest of KG 55. It operated from Jēkabpils, Latvia, from 29 February. It had 11 H-16 variants from 1 June and struck targets around Andreapol on 2 June. On 2 August it withdrew to Riga and flew its 5000th mission on 3 August. it retreated to Gutenfeld East Prussia on 26 September.

From 1 December it listed 11 bombers which rose to a high of 14 (10 serviceable) on 10 January 1945. It flew airdrop missions to Budapest on 15 January and moved to Brieg, Silesia on the 20th day. It flew supply operations for the remainder of its existence from 20 January to late April 1945. The garrisons of Posen, Breslau, Glogau, and others received supplies from this unit. On 22nd it moved to Sagan-Küpper to Alt-Lönnewitz (11 February) and then to Dresden on 4 April. It was disbanded at Königgrätz, on 27 April 1945.

== Commanding officers ==
=== Geschwaderkommodore ===
- Major General Wilhelm Süssmann, 1 May 1939 – 6 March 1940
- Oberst Alois Stoeckl 7 March 1940 – 14 August 1940 (KIA)
- Oberstlt Hans Korte 15 August 1940 – 31 January 1941
- Oberstlt Benno Kosch 1 February 1941 – 26 August 1942
- Oberstlt Dr Ernst Kühl 27 August 1942 – 7 August 1943
- Oberstlt Wilhelm Antrup 8 August 1943 – 1 October 1944

== Organisation ==
Stab. Gruppe

Formed 1 May 1939.Disbanded 9 April 1945.

I. Gruppe

Formed with 1./KG 155, 2./KG 55 and 3./KG 55 1 May 1939.

II. Gruppe

Formed 1 May 1939 along with 4./KG 55, 5./KG 55 and 6./KG 55

III. Gruppe

Formed on 1 December 1939 along with 7./KG 55, 8./KG 55 and 9./KG 55.

IV. Gruppe

Formed on 1 April 1940. Reformed 1 August 1940 as Ergänzungsstaffel/KG 55. On 1 March 1941 it was redesignated 10./KG 55. Stab IV./KG 55 was formed on 7 March 1941, followed by 11./KG 55 on 21 March 1941 and 12./KG 55 on 7 April 1941.

14. (Eis)/KG 55

Unit formed 1 June 1943, disbanded 27 April 1945
