= Adlertag =

First day of German military operations to destroy the British air force

- Part of the Western Front of World War II
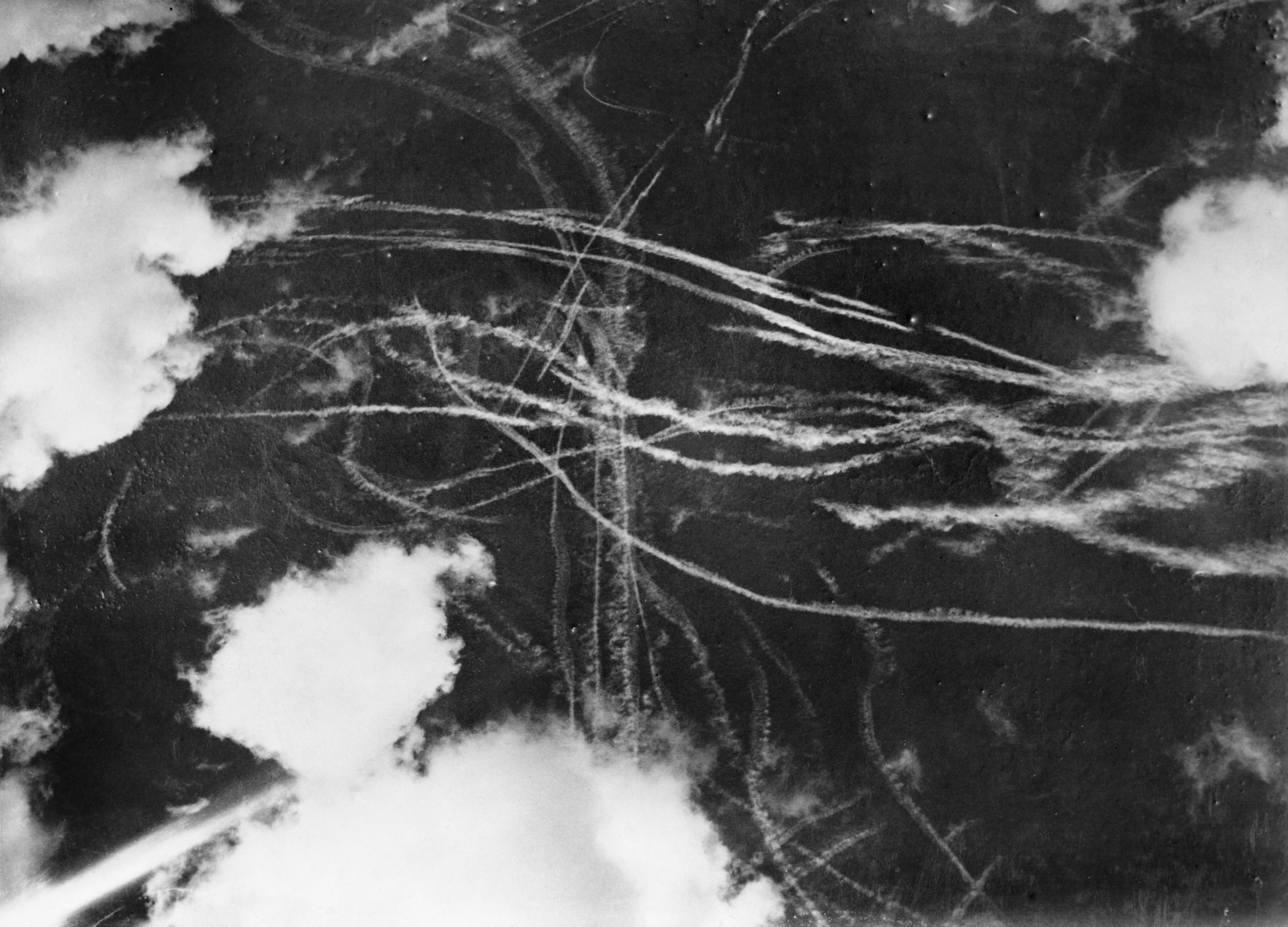
- An air battle, 1940
Date	13 August 1940
Location	England and English Channel
Result	British victory

Belligerents
United Kingdom	Germany

Commanders and leaders
Hugh Dowding; Keith Park; Charles Portal	Hermann Göring; Albert Kesselring; Hugo Sperrle; Joseph Schmid

Casualties and losses
Fighter Command: 13 fighters (air); 1 fighter (ground); 3 fighter pilots killed RAF Bomber Command: 11 bombers (air); 24 aircrew killed 9 captured Other: 47 miscellaneous aircraft (ground) c. 25 civilians killed	47–48 aircraft destroyed (air); 39 severely damaged circa 200 killed or captured including: 44 killed 23 wounded at least 45 missing

Adlertag ("Eagle Day") was the first day of Unternehmen Adlerangriff ("Operation Eagle Attack"), an operation by Nazi Germany's Luftwaffe (air force) intended to destroy the British Royal Air Force (RAF). The operation came during the Battle of Britain after Britain rejected all overtures for a negotiated peace with Germany. However, Adlertag and subsequent operations failed to destroy the RAF or gain local air superiority.

On 16 July 1940 Hitler gave the German armed forces (Wehrmacht) Directive No. 16 ordering provisional preparations for the invasion of Britain. This operation was codenamed Operation Sea Lion (Unternehmen Seelöwe). Before this could be carried out, air superiority or supremacy was required. The Luftwaffe was to destroy the RAF in order to prevent it from attacking the invasion fleet or providing protection for the Royal Navy's Home Fleet, which might attempt to prevent a landing by sea. On 1 August Hitler gave the Luftwaffe's commander-in-chief, Reichsmarschall Hermann Göring and the Oberkommando der Luftwaffe Directive No. 17 —"For the conduct of air and sea warfare against England"— to launch the air assault.

The essential target was RAF Fighter Command. The service's destruction would deny the British their air superiority asset and feeling vulnerable to air attack might negotiate for peace. Throughout July and early August, the Germans made preparations for Adlertag. The date of the assault was postponed several times because of bad weather. Eventually it was carried out on 13 August 1940, inflicting significant damage and casualties on the ground, but, marred by poor intelligence and communication, they did not significantly impair Fighter Command's ability to defend British air space.

Göring had promised Hitler that Adlertag and Adlerangriff would achieve the results required within days, or at worst weeks. It was meant to be the beginning of the end of RAF Fighter Command, but Adlertag and the following operations failed to destroy the RAF, or gain the necessary local air superiority. As a result, Operation Sea Lion was postponed indefinitely.

== Background ==
=== Strategic overview ===
After the declaration of war on Nazi Germany by Britain and France in the aftermath of the German invasion of Poland, nine months of stalemate took place along the Western Front. After the Polish Campaign, in October 1939, the planners of the Oberkommando der Luftwaffe (OKL – Luftwaffe (Air Force) High Command) and the Oberkommando der Wehrmacht (OKW – Supreme Command of the Armed Forces) turned their attentions to Western Europe.

The German offensive—named Unternehmen Gelb (Operation Yellow), also known as the Manstein Plan—began in the west on 10 May 1940. The central campaign—the Battle of France—ended in Allied defeat and the destruction of the main French Army forces. The British Expeditionary Force escaped encirclement during the Battle of Dunkirk, but the Wehrmacht captured Paris on 14 June and overran half of France. The French surrendered on 25 June 1940.

With Western Europe neutralised, the OKL and OKW turned their attention to Britain, which was now home to the Allied base of operations in Europe. Hitler hoped Britain would negotiate for an armistice, for which he was prepared to offer generous terms. The tentative offers made by Hitler were rejected by the Churchill coalition government. Hitler now ordered the Luftwaffe and Kriegsmarine to prepare for an amphibious assault of Britain, codenamed Operation Sealion. The Luftwaffe was to eliminate enemy air power and the Kriegsmarine was ordered to make all the necessary preparations for transporting the German army (Heer) across the English Channel. (Note: The head of the German Navy Grand Admiral Erich Raeder, did not believe an amphibious attack could be launched until 1941) The Luftwaffe's task came first. Once the RAF had been rendered impotent, Göring and Hitler hoped that an invasion would be unnecessary. If this proved not to be the case, the Luftwaffe would then support the army and prevent the Royal Navy interdicting German sea traffic. Göring named the offensive against the RAF as Operation Eagle Attack (Adlerangriff).

=== Background: early battles ===
The losses of the spring campaign had weakened the Luftwaffe before the Battle of Britain. Over 1,400 aircraft had been lost in the Battle of France on top of about 500 lost in conquering Poland in 1939 and Norway in 1940. The service was forced to wait until it had reached acceptable levels before a main assault against the RAF could be made. Therefore, the first phase of the German air offensive took place over the English Channel. The Kanalkampf ("Channel battle") rarely involved attacks against RAF airfields inland, but encouraged RAF units to engage in battle by attacking British Channel convoys. These operations would last from 10 July to 8 August 1940. The attacks against shipping were not successful; only 24,000 tons (gross register) was sunk. Minelaying from aircraft proved more profitable, sinking 38,000 tons. The impact on Fighter Command was minimal. It had lost 74 fighter pilots killed or missing and 48 wounded in July, and its strength rose to 1,429 by 3 August. By that date, it was short only 124 pilots.

In the second phase of attacks, shipping, coastal airfields, radar and stations south of London were attacked during 8–18 August. The Luftwaffe gradually increased the frequency of attacks. German bombers also raided targets as far north as Liverpool during night hours.

By 12 August, German air strength had reached acceptable levels. After bringing its serviceable rates up, the Luftwaffe began Adlertag with 71 percent of its bomber force, 85 percent of its Bf 109 units, and 83 percent of its Bf 110 units operational.

The first major raid inland and against RAF airfields came on 12 August. RAF Hawkinge, Lympne, Manston and radar stations at Pevensey, Rye and Dover were to be destroyed. Portsmouth docks were also targeted. The results of the raids were mixed. The radar station at Ventnor was badly damaged and others targeted were also damaged, but not destroyed. All but Ventnor were in working order by the following morning. Attacks against the harbour and RAF stations failed to destroy them. Though none were in full working order at the end of the day, all were back in action the following morning. Unknown to German intelligence, Lympne itself was not even an operational station. This sort of intelligence blunder contributed to the failure of Adlertag.

Overall, the Germans had not achieved a degree of success commensurate with their exertions.

== Luftwaffe preparations ==
=== Intelligence ===
Radar covered the indicated air space.

Faulty intelligence was the component that was mostly responsible for the failure of Adlertag. While the gap between the British and Germans was not yet wide in this regard, the British were starting to gain a decisive lead in intelligence. The breaking of the Enigma machine and poor Luftwaffe signals discipline allowed the British easy access to German communications traffic. The impact of Ultra on the Battle of Britain is a matter of dispute, with Official Histories claiming there was no direct impact. Whatever the truth, Ultra, and the Y service in particular, gave the British an increasingly accurate picture of German order of battle deployments.

Joseph "Beppo" Schmid was commander of the Luftwaffe's Military Intelligence Branch (Abteilung 5 as Chief IC). Throughout this time, Schmid's reports made a series of errors. In July 1940, Schmid grossly overestimated the strengths of the Luftwaffe and underestimated the RAF. The most serious mistakes were made concerning radar, airfield identification, and production sites. Schmid asserted that the number of operational airfields in southern England were severely limited; estimated that the British could produce only 180–330 fighters per month (the true figure was 496) and that figure would decrease, indicating that the RAF could not sustain a long battle of attrition. Schmid also claimed the command at all levels was rigid and inflexible, with fighters being tied to home bases. In his list of omissions, Schmid failed to mention the RAF maintenance and organisation operations, which put back damaged aircraft with rapid effect. He anticipated a short battle. Crucially, Schmid failed to mention radar at all.

The lack of sustained and concentrated attacks on radar left it free to help direct the deployment of RAF units at opportune moments. Its continued warnings of incoming raids were a crucial benefit to Fighter Command. The Luftwaffe also had poor intelligence on the type of RAF airfields. It made repeated errors, often misidentifying airfields as Fighter Command bases, which turned out to belong to RAF Coastal Command and RAF Bomber Command. On Adlertag, most of the targets on the Luftwaffe's list—if destroyed—would not have impaired Fighter Command in the slightest.

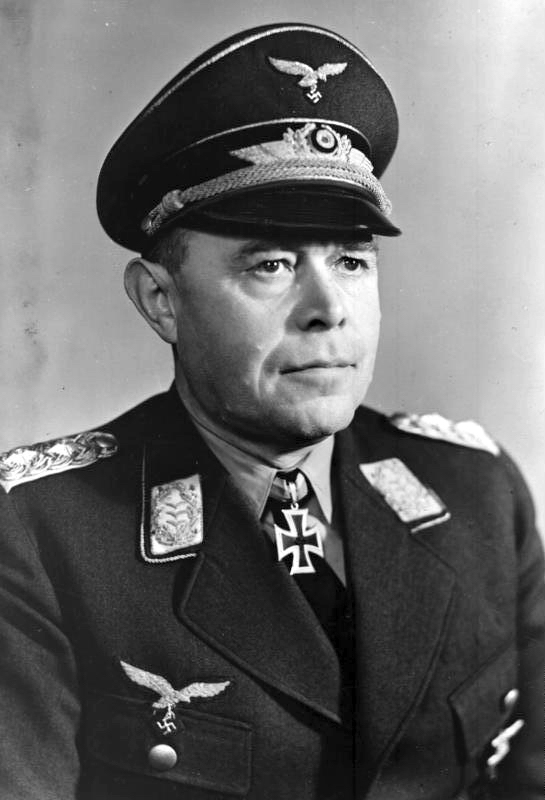
Albert Kesselring commanded Luftflotte 2.

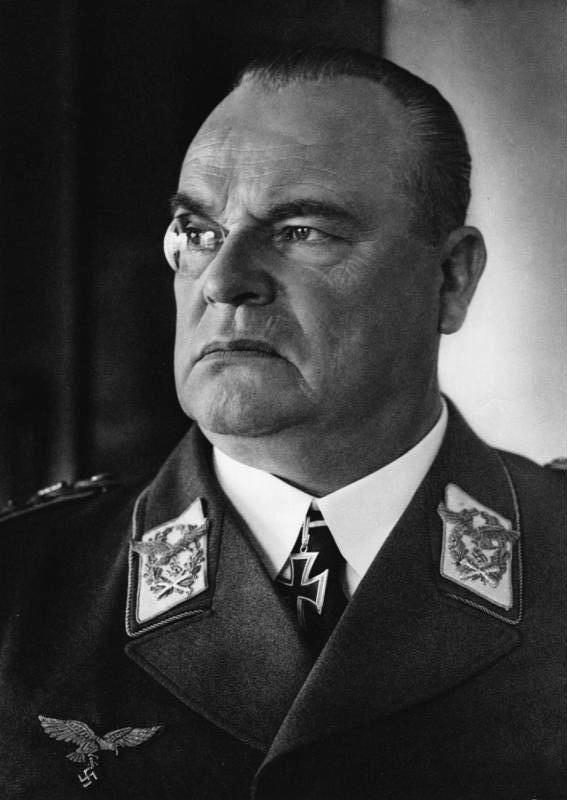
Hugo Sperrle, commanded Luftflotte 3.

=== Targets and order of battle ===
The following targets were chosen for attack on 13 August 1940:

Attack on 13 August 1940
German bomber unit	Target
Kampfgeschwader 1 (KG 1)	RAF Biggin Hill
Kampfgeschwader 76 (KG 76)	RAF Kenley RAF Debden/RAF Biggin Hill/ Other unknown targets
Kampfgeschwader 2 (KG 2)	RAF Hornchurch; RAF Eastchurch; RAF Manston
Kampfgeschwader 3 (KG 3)	RAF Eastchurch (Note: According to de Zeng et al writes there is nothing published on KG 3; it was one of the most obscure bomber units, owing to the loss of most of its records at the end of the war.)
Kampfgeschwader 53 (KG 53)	RAF North Weald
Erprobungsgruppe 210	Radar Stations; Rye, Pevensey, Dover; RAF Hawkinge; RAF Manston; RAF Kenley
Kampfgeschwader 4 (KG 4)	Unknown targets (lack of records)/some mine-laying operations in English Channel
Kampfgeschwader 40 (KG 40)	RAF Dishforth
Kampfgeschwader 26 (KG 26)	RAF Dishforth/Linton-on-Ouse
Kampfgeschwader 30 (KG 30)	RAF Driffield
Kampfgeschwader 27 (KG 27)	Ports of Bristol/Birkenhead/Liverpool
Lehrgeschwader 1 (LG 1)	RAF Worthy Down/ Ports of Southampton, Portsmouth and surrounding airfields/RAF Detling/Other unspecified operations
Sturzkampfgeschwader 3 (StG 3)	StG 3 was to take part. For unknown reasons it was removed from the order of battle on 13 August. Another source asserts that the unit had its missions cancelled owing to poor weather.
Kampfgeschwader 51 (KG 51)	RAF Bibury/Spithead harbour/Ventnor radar station
Kampfgeschwader 54 (KG 54)	Fleet Air Arm base Gosport/RAF Croydon RAF Farnborough RAF Odiham
Kampfgeschwader 55 (KG 55)	Plymouth/Feltham/RAF Middle Wallop
Sturzkampfgeschwader 1 (StG 1)	RAF Warmwell/RAF Detling
I., and II./Sturzkampfgeschwader 2 (StG 2)	Portland area and airfields; RAF Middle Wallop/RAF Warmwell; Yeovil
Sturzkampfgeschwader 77 (StG 77)	RAF Warmwell/Portland

== RAF operational command ==
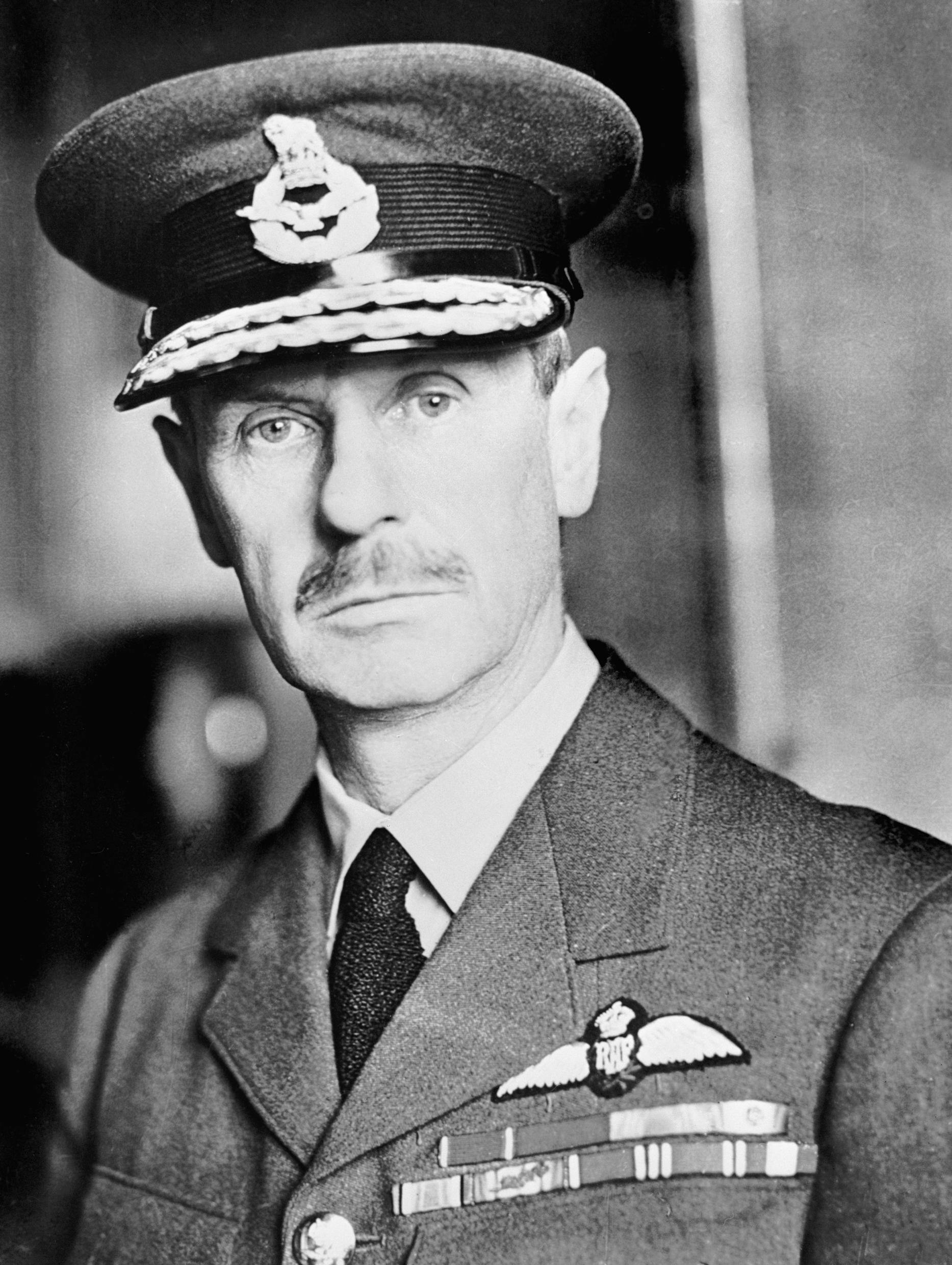
Hugh Dowding, C-in-C Fighter Command.

The keystone of the British defence was the complex infrastructure of detection, command, and control that ran the battle. This was the Dowding System, after its chief architect, Air Chief Marshal Sir Hugh Dowding, the air officer commanding RAF Fighter Command. Dowding modernised a system created up from 1917 by Major General E B Ashmore. The core of Dowding's system was implemented by Dowding himself: the use of Radio Direction Finding (RDF or radar) was at his behest, and its use, supplemented by information by the Royal Observer Corps (ROC), combined with an organisation system to process the information was crucial to the RAF's ability to efficiently intercept incoming enemy aircraft. The technology was named RDF with misleading intent – the vague description would disguise the full nature of the system to the enemy if its existence ever became known.

The first indications of incoming air raids were received by the Chain Home RDF facilities, which were located along the coastlines of Britain. In most circumstances, RDF could pick up formations of Luftwaffe aircraft as they organised over their own airfields in northern France and Belgium. Once the raiding aircraft moved inland behind the radar stations, the formations were plotted by the ROC. The information from RDF and the Observer Corps were sent through to the main operations room of Fighter Command Headquarters at RAF Bentley Priory. The plots were assessed to determine whether they were "hostile" or "friendly". If hostile, the information was sent to the main "operations room", which was in a large underground bunker.

Here, the course information of each raid was plotted by Women's Auxiliary Air Force (WAAF), who received information by telephone. Additional intelligence was provided by the Y Service radio posts, which monitored enemy radio communications, and the Ultra decoding centre based at Bletchley Park, which gave the RAF intelligence on the German order of battle. Colour-coded counters representing each raid were placed on a large table, which had a map of Britain overlaid and squared off with a British Modified Grid. As the plots of the raiding aircraft moved, the counters were pushed across the map by magnetic "rakes". This system enabled the main "Fighter Controller" and Dowding to see where each formation was heading, at what height, and in what strength. This allowed an estimate to be made of possible targets. The age of the information was denoted by the colour of the counter. The simplicity of the system meant that decisions could be made quickly.

This information was simultaneously sent to the headquarters of each group, where it was cross-checked through a filter room before being sent through to another operations room, housed in an underground bunker. Because Group had tactical control of the battle, the operations room was different in layout from the main headquarters at Bentley Priory. The main map on the plotting table represented the group command area and its associated airfields. Extensive radio and telephone equipment transmitted and received a constant flow of information from the various sector airfields as well as the Observer Corps, AA Command and the navy. The "Duty fighter controller" was the Group GOC's personal representative and was tasked with controlling how and when each raid would be intercepted. If the telephone system failed engineers would be on site within minutes to repair the broken links.

== Battle ==
=== KG 2 raid ===
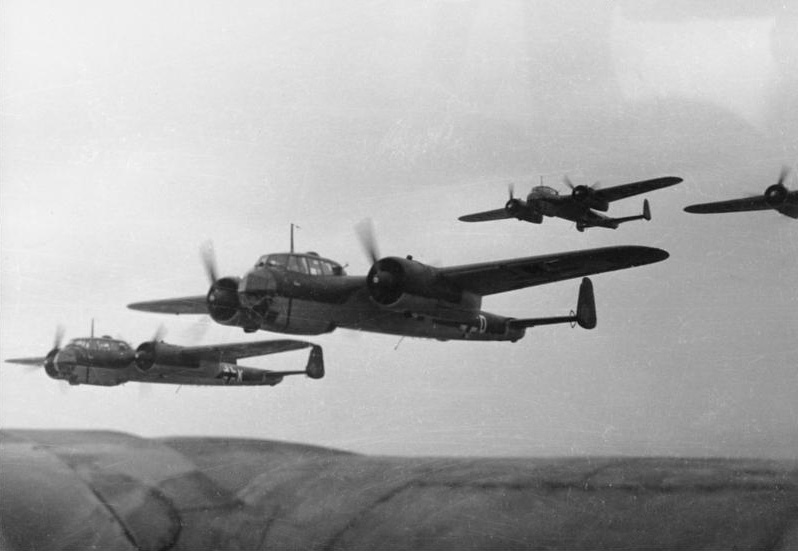
KG 2 flew Dornier Do 17s like these throughout the Battle of Britain.

On the morning of 13 August, the weather was bad and Göring ordered a postponement of raids. However, the Dornier Do 17s of KG 2 were not informed and took off at 04:50 for their target. They were to meet with their escorts from ZG 26 over the Channel. ZG 26 received the cancellation order, but II., and III./KG 2 did not. KG 2 had formed up by 05:10, led by Geschwaderkommodore Johannes Fink. Part of the ZG 26 formation that had taken off—led by Oberstleutnant Joachim Huth—tried to warn the Dorniers of the cancellation. Unable to contact the bombers by radio, Huth tried to signal them by flying in front of them and performing aerobatics. Fink ignored him and flew on. KG 2 flew around the coast to its target, Eastchurch airfield on the Isle of Sheppey. Albert Kesselring had issued orders for bombers to abandon missions if their escorts did not show up, but Fink did not want to be accused of failing to obey orders and continued onward even though the Bf 110s turned back. The return leg would take KG 2 across No. 11 Group's territory, which could have been disastrous without fighter escort but owing to the Observer Corps misjudging the direction of the bombers, due to low-lying cloud, and the radar not picking up the direction of the German bombers, the WAAF plotted the course of the raid incorrectly and the RAF failed to prevent the target being attacked.

For an hour after dawn on 13 August, there were few German tracks upon the plot tables in operations rooms, and none at all in the central and eastern Channel. The first signs of concentration, however, came earlier than usual, for between 05:30 and 05:40 two formations of 30 or more aircraft were located in the Amiens area. For 30 minutes, they remained over land, but at 06:10 they began moving over the Channel. The ROC and radar tracked them and guided the RAF units to intercept. Unaware of the German intent, the controllers directed three full squadrons and detachments of three others were alerted by 06:15. No. 151 Squadron RAF was protecting a convoy in the Thames, No. 111 was protecting RAF Hawkinge and No. 74 was covering RAF Manston. Parts of No. 85, No. 43 and No. 238 were also airborne near London. By 06:25, the German formations were well over the Channel. No. 238 was moved to cover their own base at RAF Warmwell. No. 257 was also ordered to take off at 06:20 to patrol Canterbury. Not satisfied with the strength of the forces already airborne, controllers dispatched squadrons 601, 213, 64 and 87 to intercept between 06:30 and 06:35. The first combats began at 06:30.

Owing to the mistake by the Observer Corps, and the Geschwader being missed approaching the eastern, instead of central Channel by radar, KG 2 hit the RAF airfield. KG 2 claimed 10 Spitfires destroyed on the ground. In fact, no Fighter Command fighters were lost. For some time afterward, this wrong claim convinced German intelligence that Eastchurch was a fighter station and the Luftwaffe would launch seven fruitless raids on it in the coming weeks. Added to this mistake was the failure to keep up pressure. Raids were spaced out, giving the field time to recover. The station was used by RAF Coastal Command, which lost five Bristol Blenheims in the attack and one Coastal Command Spitfire. However, severe damage was done to the infrastructure. Much equipment and ammunition was destroyed and 16 of the Command's personnel were killed. RAF Eastchurch was back in operation by 16:00.

Eventually the bombers were intercepted. KG 2 lost five Do 17s in the attempt; six Dorniers were also badly damaged. In return, accurate fire from the Dornier gunners shot down two Hurricanes from the attacking squadrons, which included No. 111, No. 151 and No. 74, which was led by Adolph Malan. Malan himself shot down one Do 17. Another source suggests the destruction of five Do 17s and another seven damaged. German manpower losses amounted to 11 killed in action and nine prisoners of war.

=== Coastal airfields and ports ===
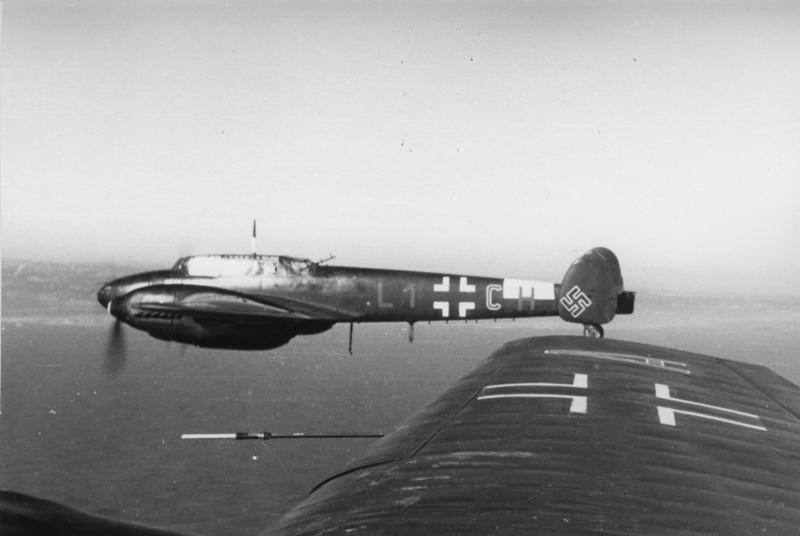
Messerschmitt Bf 110s of 1./LG 1. The type suffered heavy losses on Adlertag.

Most units of Luftflotte 2 received the order to abandon morning operations, but some began their attacks aimed at airfields and ports in southern Britain. KG 76 abandoned its attack on Debden but struck at RAF Kenley and other airfields in Kent and Essex. Losses and results are unknown. KG 27 also abandoned most of its operations. III./KG 27 did attempt to make it through to the Bristol Harbour, losing one He 111 to No. 87 Squadron RAF in the attempt. Little damage was done.

The cancellation order had not reached Luftflotte 3 HQ at all. Its commander, Hugo Sperrle ordered attacks to commence. At 05:00, 20 Junkers Ju 88s of I./KG 54 took off to bomb the Royal Aircraft Establishment's airfield at 'RAF Farnborough' (RAE Farnborough). At 05:05, 18 Ju 88s from II./KG 54 took off for RAF Odiham. At 05:50, 88 Junkers Ju 87s of StG 77 began heading for Portland Harbour. The raids were escorted by about 60 Bf 110s of Zerstörergeschwader 2 (Destroyer Wing 2; ZG 2), and V./LG 1 and 173 Bf 109s from Jagdgeschwader 27 (JG 27), JG 53 and JG 3, which all flew ahead of the bomber stream to clear the airspace of enemy fighters. StG 77's target was obscured by cloud, but KG 54 continued to their target. RAF fighters from RAF Northolt, RAF Tangmere and RAF Middle Wallop intercepted. Four Ju 88s and one Bf 109 from JG 2 were shot down. The German fighters claimed six RAF fighters and the bombers another 14. In reality, the bombers only damaged five. The Bf 109s destroyed only one and damaged another. Of the five RAF fighters damaged by the bombers, two were write-offs. Of the 20 claimed, just three fighters were lost and three pilots were wounded. None were killed.

Further missions by II./KG 54 to RAF Croydon were cancelled. I./KG 54 struck at the Fleet Air Arm (FAA) base at Gosport. ZG 2 was supposed to provide escort during one these attacks, and in a breakdown of communications, arrived over the target without their Ju 88s, which had been ordered to stand down. One Bf 110 was shot down by No. 238 Squadron RAF.

At 11:10, V./LG 1 Bf 110s took off in advance of a raid by KG 54, possibly to tempt RAF fighters into battle before the main assault, so the RAF would be out of position. The bombers' mission was cancelled. The order did not reach V./LG 1 who continued to their target area. The 23 Bf 110s continued to the target of Portland. They ran into Hurricane of No. 601 Squadron and lost six Bf 110s destroyed and three damaged. Only one Hurricane was shot down and another damaged. A second source states only four Bf 110s were destroyed, whilst a third gives the loss of five destroyed and five damaged. The Zerstörergeschwader optimistically claimed 30 RAF fighters destroyed (in reality RAF fighter losses in aerial combat amounted to 13 throughout the entire day), for a loss of 13 Bf 110s. The morning's effort had been a fiasco. The attacks showed a serious German technical failure in air-to-air communication.

=== Renewed attacks ===
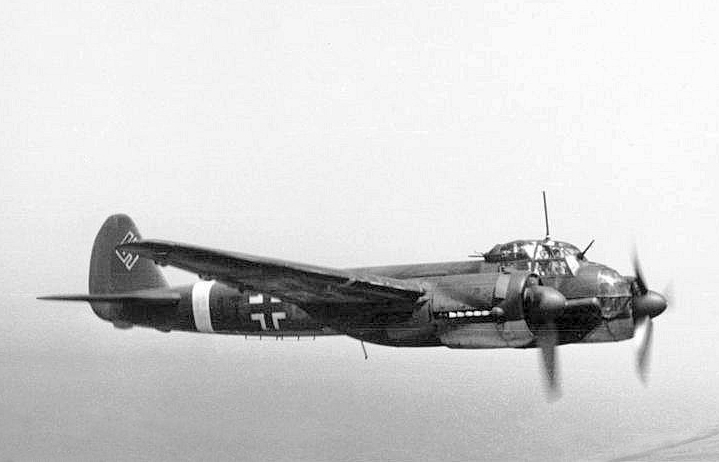
Junkers Ju 88. In the mid-afternoon, this aircraft formed the backbone of German bomber formations.

The official go-ahead was given at 14:00. At 15:30, some 58–80 Ju 88s from I., II., and III./LG 1, escorted by 30 Bf 110s of V./LG 1, took off to bomb Boscombe Down and Worthy Down. RAF Andover was to be bombed as well, with the support of 52 Ju 87s from StG 1 and StG 2 who were to strike at RAF Warmwell and Yeovil. I./JG 53 flew a fighter sweep ahead of the bombers from Poole to Lyme Regis in order to tempt the RAF into battle. I./JG 53 made landfall at 16:00. The sweep failed to attract and divert RAF squadrons. Instead, all it succeeded in doing was to alert the RAF defences a critical five minutes earlier. When the main wave of LG 1 and StG 2 arrived over the coast, they were greeted by 77 RAF fighters.

II., and III./JG 53 and III./ZG 76 flew escort for the Ju 87s. ZG 2 and JG 27 flew escort for LG 1. In response the whole of No. 10 Group RAF intercepted. One Staffel (Squadron) of II./StG 2 was badly hit by No. 609 Squadron RAF; six out of nine Ju 87s were shot down. StG 1 and 2 gave up on their original targets owing to clouds. Both headed for Portland.

I./LG 1 abandoned Boscombe Down and bombed Southampton instead. No. 238 Squadron had been detailed to intercept, but the fighter escort was too strong and the bombers were not diverted from their course. Several warehouses were destroyed and a cold storage plant was also knocked out. All fires were under control by dusk. One III./LG 1 dropped its bombs by RAF Middle Wallop Sector Station by mistake. Only Andover airfield was hit, and it was used for bomber operations, not fighters. III./LG 1 lost two Ju 88s. The 13 Ju 88 Gruppen (Groups) had lost six destroyed and many damaged. They had escaped lightly. The bombing succeeded in destroying a bicycle factory, a furniture warehouse and a refrigerated meat depot. Luftwaffe intelligence had not identified the Southampton Spitfire factory—on the waterfront near the docks—as an important target. Poor intelligence suggested it was a bomber factory. Only later, in September, was it attacked and severely damaged. However, even then the Germans were unaware of the damage inflicted to Spitfire production. The factory would later be broken up and production dispersed.

=== Ju 87 operations ===
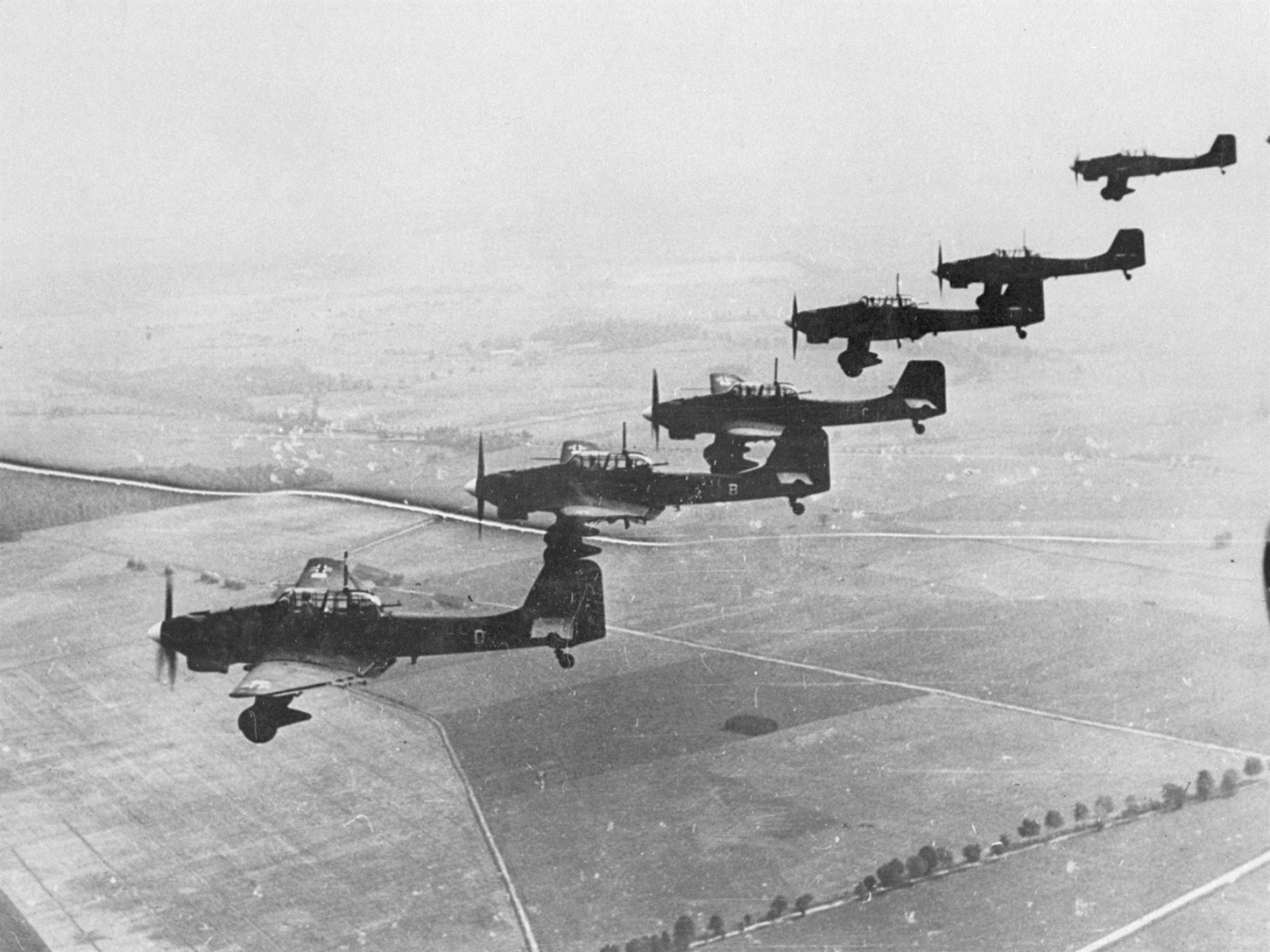
Ju 87Bs. The Ju 87s severely damaged RAF Detling.

StG 77 was also in action, escorted by JG 27 Bf 109s. StG 77s 52 Ju 87s were joined by 40 Ju 88s of KG 54. Both formations were heading for No. 10 Group RAF's airfields. StG 77 was targeting RAF Warmwell. The Geschwader failed to find its target, dropping its bombs at random. The other Ju 87 units had attracted much attention and StG 77 escaped unnoticed.

Erprobungsgruppe 210 were sent further east for an operation to attack targets near Southend. They took off at 15:15 and were escorted by ZG 76. They found unbroken cloud over Essex. No. 56 Squadron RAF intercepted, but Erprobungsgruppe 210 dropped their bombs over Canterbury. II./StG 1 was sent to bomb airfields near Rochester. It failed to find the target and returned without incident. IV./LG 1—also with Ju 87s—was sent after RAF Detling. JG 26 went out on a fighter sweep to clear the skies in advance of the attack. JG 26 lost one Bf 109 over Folkestone from an unknown cause. The Ju 87s bombed the station and 40 Bf 109s strafed it, killing the commander. The operations block was hit, causing high casualties. The losses were disastrous for No. 53 Squadron RAF, which lost a number of Blenheims on the ground. The commander killed was Group Captain E P Meggs-Davis. One Squadron Leader was killed—a J.H Lowe—and a further two were wounded. One of the wounded men was a First World War ace Robert J. O. Compston. The station's casualties amounted to 24 killed and 42 wounded. However, Detling was not an RAF Fighter Command station and the attack did not affect No. 11 Group RAF in any way.

=== South East raids ===
I., II., and III./KG 55 were also in action. III./KG 55 bombed Heathrow Airport. Results are unknown and losses are unclear. KG 55 suffered heavy losses the previous day, so its operations seemed limited. On 12 August it lost 13 Heinkel He 111s and their crews. The next day, 14 August, they would lose their Geschwaderkommodore (Wing Commander) Alois Stoeckl.

In the afternoon, a force of 80 Do 17s of KG 3—escorted by JG 51, JG 52, JG 54 and 60 Bf 109s from JG 26 (some 270 aircraft in all)—headed for Eastchurch airfield and the Short Brothers factory at Rochester. III./KG 3 broke away from the main formation and attacked Eastchurch while II./KG 3 headed for Rochester. Significant damage was done to the factory producing the Short Stirling heavy bomber. The RAF's No. 3, No. 64, No. 111, No. 151, No. 234, No. 249, No. 601 and No. 609 squadrons intercepted. According to the account of JG 26, the British fighters made little impression on the bombers. Three JG 51 Bf 109s were shot down in skirmishes with RAF fighters.

RAF Bomber Command also took part in the day's fighting. Although Charles Portal—AOC (Air Officer Commanding)—had protested against the pointlessness of attacking airfields in Scandinavia, the Air Ministry insisted on such raids. No. 82 Squadron RAF sent twelve Bristol Blenheims to bomb KG 30 airfields at Aalborg, Denmark. One pilot turned back complaining of "fuel problems" and was court-martialled. That bomber was the only one to return. The rest fell to AAA fire and fighters. Some 24 airmen were killed and nine were captured.

=== Night raids ===
As darkness fell at the close of Adlertag, Sperrle sent nine Kampfgruppe 100 He 111s to conduct a strategic bombing raid against the Supermarine Spitfire factory at Castle Bromwich, Birmingham. Despite the group being a specialist night strike unit which had high expertise in night navigation, only four of the crews found their targets. The eleven 551 lb (250 kg) bombs dropped were not sufficient to disrupt fighter production. Around five of the 11 fell inside the compound. Casualties were small as workers had gone to shelter. Serious damage was done only to offices and a tool room, while a gas main was fractured. Another group, led by Gruppenkommandeur Hauptmann (Captain) Friedrich Achenbrenner, dispatched 15 He 111s from bases in Brittany across the Irish Sea to strike at the Short Brothers factory at Queen's Island in Belfast, Northern Ireland. Five Short Stirling aircraft were destroyed. KG 27 also took part in the missions, and bombed Glasgow during the night although their specific target is unclear. Other bombers, commencing the night stage of Adlertag, resolutely flew the length and breadth of Great Britain, bombing Bristol, Cardiff, Swansea, Liverpool, Sheffield, Norwich, Edinburgh and Aberdeen. Very little damage was done, though some rail tracks were cut temporarily and around 100 casualties were suffered. It is unknown if any German aircraft were lost. One German airman was found wandering the countryside in Balcombe, West Sussex. No other traces of the aircraft or its crew were found.

== Aftermath ==
=== Effect of raids ===
The Germans had maintained the attacks on airfields in south-eastern England which they had started the previous day. On 12 August, most of the Kentish airfields had been attacked; and on 13 August, the Germans concentrated on the second line airfields south of London. The concentration on Detling and Eastchurch was a failure, as both were Coastal Command stations and bore no relation to Fighter Command. The Germans may have reasoned that if bases such as Manston, Hawkinge and Lympne were neutralised through the attacks on 12 August, then Fighter Command may have had to move onto these airfields. In fact, the bombing of 12 August had failed to knock out these strips, and Adlertag had failed to destroy or render Detling or Eastchurch nonoperational.

=== Overclaiming ===
Overclaiming in aerial warfare is not uncommon. During the Battle of Britain (and, indeed, the rest of the Second World War), both sides claimed to have shot down and destroyed more enemy aircraft on the ground and in the air than they had in reality. RAF Fighter Command claimed 78 German aircraft shot down on 13 August 1940. Another source states that official RAF claims amounted to 64. Actual German losses amounted to 47–48 aircraft destroyed and 39 severely damaged. Conversely, the Luftwaffe claimed to have destroyed 70 Hawker Hurricanes and Spitfires in the air and a further 18 Blenheim bombers in the air alone. This was an exaggeration of about 300 percent. Another 84 RAF fighters were claimed on the ground. Actual RAF losses in the air amounted to 13 fighters and 11 bombers, with 47 aircraft of various kinds on the ground.

=== Battle of Britain ===
The failure of Adlertag did not deter the Luftwaffe from continuing its campaign. The assault against RAF airfields continued throughout August and into September 1940. The battles involved large numbers of aircraft and heavy losses on both sides. The Luftwaffe failed to develop any focused strategy for defeating RAF Fighter Command. At first, it attempted to destroy RAF bases, then switched to strategic bombing by day and night. It tried to achieve the destruction of several British industries at the same time, switching from bombing aircraft factories, to attacking supporting industries, import or distribution networks such as coastal ports. An attempt was even made against unrelated targets, such as destroying the morale of the British population.

The failure of the Luftwaffe to identify the radar chain and distinguish RAF fighter bases from those of other RAF commands undermined its ability to destroy the British fighter defences. The Luftwaffe underestimated British radar, and they had not realised its importance in the British operational system. To the contrary, OKL believed that the radar stations would benefit the German effort by sending RAF forces into large-scale air battles for the Luftwaffe to decimate. The RAF aircraft industry supported the losses and its pilots were replaced sufficiently to limit the RAF's decline in strength and deny the Germans victory. Conversely, the RAF were able to ensure the serviceability rates and aircrew numbers of the Luftwaffe declined in August–September. (Note: Bungay notes that by between 27 August to 4 September 1940 that German bomber unit strength had shrunk to an average of 20 out of 35–40. Bf 109 units had declined to 18 out of 35–40 and Bf 110 units had shrunk even lower. Bungay also notes that the RAF pilot losses were 125 a week and the force was short by 150 pilots by 31 August 1940. Only 150 pilots could be replaced up to 21 September. Bomber pilots were converted to cope. Overall trend was up from July 1940. Murray focuses on German crew losses. Bf 109 units were running at 67 percent, Bf 110 units 46 percent, and bombers were at 59 percent establishment by 14 September. One week later it was 64, 52 and 52 percent respectively. It seemed that the Germans were "running out of aircraft". Wood and Dempster assert that RAF operational strength hardly declined, from 64.8 percent on 24 August to 64.7 percent on 31 August, and finally 64.25 percent on 7 September 1940.)

Having failed to defeat the RAF, the Luftwaffe adopted a different and clearer strategy of strategic bombing known as the Blitz. However, as with the campaign against the RAF, the types of targets differed radically and no sustained pressure was put under any one type of British target. Disputes among the OKL staff revolved more around tactics than strategy. This method condemned the offensive over Britain to failure before it had even begun. The end result of the air campaign against Britain in 1940 and 1941 was a decisive failure to end the war. As Hitler committed Germany to ever increasing military adventures, the Wehrmacht became increasingly overstretched and was unable to cope with a multi-front war. By 1944, the Allies were ready to launch Operation Overlord, the invasion of Western Europe. The Battle of Britain ensured that the Western Allies had a base from which to launch the campaign and that there would be a Western Allied presence on the battlefield to meet the Soviet Red Army in central Europe at the end of the war in May 1945.
