= Kless =

Kless is a surname of German origin. Notable people with the surname include:

- Friedrich Kless (1906–1994), German general
- Ruby Kless Sondock (1926–2026), American judge
