= Chyornaya Rechka =

Chyornaya rechka (Russian: Чёрная Речка, lit. 'Black River') may refer to:

- Chyornaya Rechka (Saint Petersburg), a small river in Saint Petersburg, Russia
- Chyornaya rechka, alternative name for (any) Chyornaya River
- Chyornaya rechka Municipal Okrug, a municipal okrug of Primorsky District in the federal city of St. Petersburg, Russia
- Chyornaya Rechka (rural locality), several rural localities in Russia
- Chyornaya Rechka (Saint Petersburg Metro), a station of the Saint Petersburg Metro, St. Petersburg, Russia
