= Hans Korte (general) =

- Born: 16 December 1899
- Died: 8 April 1990 (aged 90)
- Military career
- Allegiance: German Empire; Weimar Republic; Nazi Germany
- Branch: Luftwaffe
- Rank: Generalmajor
- Commands: Kampfgeschwader 55; 13. Luftwaffen-Feld-Division; 1st Parachute Division; 2.(Torpedo)/Flieger-Division
- Conflicts: World War II
- Awards: Knight's Cross of the Iron Cross

Hans Korte (16 December 1899 – 8 April 1990) was a German general during World War II. He was a recipient of the Knight's Cross of the Iron Cross of Nazi Germany. Korte surrendered to the British troops in May 1945 and was interned until October 1947.

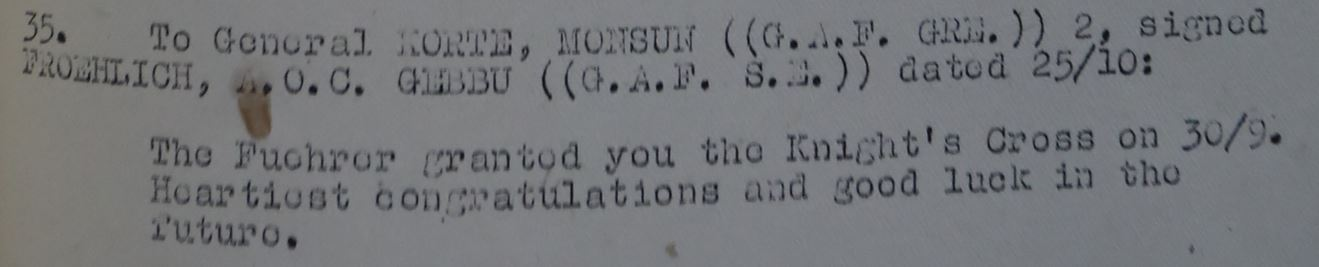
Allied ULTRA decrypt for this occasion

== Awards ==
- Knight's Cross of the Iron Cross on 30 September 1944 as Generalmajor and commander of the 2.(Torpedo)/Flieger-Division

Military offices
Preceded by Oberst Alois Stoeckl	Geschwaderkommodore of Kampfgeschwader 55; 15 August 1940 - 31 January 1941	Succeeded by Oberstleutnant Benno Kosch
Preceded by Generalleutnant Herbert Olbrich	Commander of 13th Luftwaffe Field Division; 1 December 1942 - 1 October 1943	Succeeded by Generalleutnant Hellmuth Reymann
Preceded by General der Fallschirmtruppe Richard Heidrich	Commander of 1. Fallschirmjäger-Division; 4 January 1944 - 21 February 1944	Succeeded by General der Fallschirmtruppe Richard Heidrich
Preceded by General der Flieger Johannes Fink	Commander of 2. Flieger-Division; 22 February 1944 - 10 September 1944	Succeeded by Unit Disbanded
