= Wilhelm Süssmann =

German general

- Born: 16 September 1891
- Died: 20 May 1941 (aged 49) Aegina, Greece
- Allegiance: German Empire; Weimar Republic; Nazi Germany
- Branch: Luftwaffe
- Rank: Lieutenant General
- Conflicts: World War II: Battle of Crete

Wilhelm Süssmann (16 September 1891 – 20 May 1941) was a German general in the Luftwaffe (Air Force) during World War II who was killed in action during the Battle of Crete.

Süssmann was the first commander of the 55th Bomber Wing, from its formation on 1 May 1939 to 6 March 1940. He commanded the 2nd Fallschirmjäger Regiment and later the 7th Flieger Division during the Battle of Crete during which he was killed in action when the DFS 230 glider carrying him and his staff crashed on the island of Aegina. A Ju 52 aircraft was towing the glider when a sudden maneuver generated a slipstream, sending the glider into an uncontrolled dive.

Military offices
Preceded by —	Geschwaderkommodore of Kampfgeschwader 55; 1 May 1939 – 6 March 1940	Succeeded by Oberst Alois Stoeckl
