= Chyornaya Rechka (rural locality) =

Chyornaya Rechka (Russian: Чёрная ре́чка) is the name of several rural localities in Russia:

- Chyornaya Rechka, Chelyabinsk Oblast, a settlement under the administrative jurisdiction of the Town of Satka in Satkinsky District of Chelyabinsk Oblast; 55°2′N 59°9′E
- Chyornaya Rechka, Kabardino-Balkar Republic, a selo in Urvansky District of the Kabardino-Balkar Republic; 43°37′N 43°50′E
- Chyornaya Rechka, Kaluga Oblast, a selo in Khvastovichsky District of Kaluga Oblast
- Chyornaya Rechka, Republic of Karelia, a settlement in Olonetsky District of the Republic of Karelia
- Chyornaya Rechka, Khabarovsk Krai, a selo in Khabarovsky District of Khabarovsk Krai
- Chyornaya Rechka, Sanchursky District, Kirov Oblast, a village in Matvinursky Rural Okrug of Sanchursky District in Kirov Oblast; 57°5′N 47°17′E
- Chyornaya Rechka, Yaransky District, Kirov Oblast, a village under the administrative jurisdiction of the Town of Yaransk in Yaransky District of Kirov Oblast; 57°11′N 48°6′E
- Chyornaya Rechka, Krasnoyarsk Krai, a village in Tanzybeysky Selsoviet of Yermakovsky District in Krasnoyarsk Krai
- Chyornaya Rechka, Leningrad Oblast, a village under the administrative jurisdiction of Morozovskoye Settlement Municipal Formation in Vsevolozhsky District of Leningrad Oblast; 59°55′N 30°59′E
- Chyornaya Rechka, Sapozhkovsky District, Ryazan Oblast, a selo under the administrative jurisdiction of Sapozhok Work Settlement in Sapozhkovsky District of Ryazan Oblast
- Chyornaya Rechka, Sasovsky District, Ryazan Oblast, a village in Batkovsky Rural Okrug of Sasovsky District in Ryazan Oblast
- Chyornaya Rechka, Isaklinsky District, Samara Oblast, a village in Isaklinsky District of Samara Oblast
- Chyornaya Rechka, Shentalinsky District, Samara Oblast, a settlement in Shentalinsky District of Samara Oblast
- Chyornaya Rechka, Sverdlovsk Oblast, a settlement in Pudlingovsky Selsoviet under the administrative jurisdiction of the Town of Krasnoufimsk in Sverdlovsk Oblast
- Chyornaya Rechka, Tomsky District, Tomsk Oblast, a settlement in Tomsky District of Tomsk Oblast
- Chyornaya Rechka, Tomsky District, Tomsk Oblast, a village in Tomsky District of Tomsk Oblast
- Chyornaya Rechka, Tyumen Oblast, a village in Chervishevsky Rural Okrug of Tyumensky District in Tyumen Oblast
- Chyornaya Rechka, Ulyanovsk Oblast, a settlement under the administrative jurisdiction of Novomaynsky Settlement Okrug in Melekessky District of Ulyanovsk Oblast
