= Alois Stoeckl =

German pilot

- Born: 22 August 1895; Mühldorf, Kingdom of Bavaria, German Empire
- Died: 14 August 1940 (aged 44); United Kingdom
- Burial place: Cannock Chase German Military Cemetery
- Military career
- Allegiance: Nazi Germany
- Branch: Luftwaffe
- Rank: Oberst
- Commands: Kampfgeschwader 55
- Conflicts: Battle of Britain †
- Awards: Knight's Cross of the Iron Cross

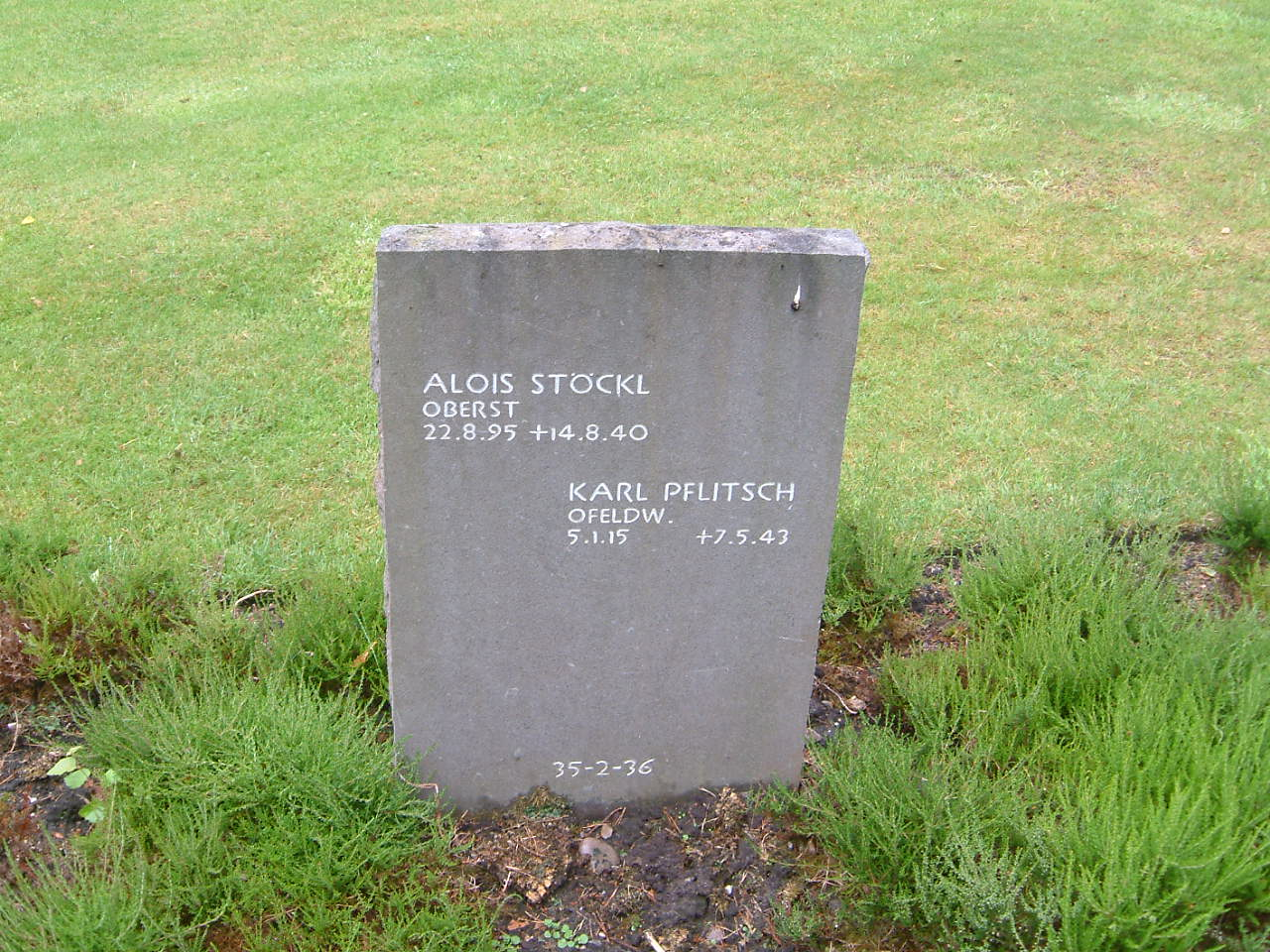
Stöckl's grave at the Cannock Chase German Military Cemetery.

Alois Stoeckl (also referred to as Alois Stöckl; 22 August 1895 – 14 August 1940) was a German pilot during World War II who commanded the 55th Bomber Wing of the Luftwaffe. He was a recipient of the Knight's Cross of the Iron Cross of Nazi Germany.

Alois Stoeckl was killed on 14 August 1940 after the Heinkel He 111 that he was an observer in was attacked by British Spitfires from No. 609 Squadron RAF. He was shot down by British pilot John Dundas DFC. Stoeckl and two of his crew were buried at the Cannock Chase German Military Cemetery.

== Awards and decorations ==
- Knight's Cross of the Iron Cross on 4 July 1940 as Oberst and commander of Kampfgeschwader 55

Military offices
Preceded by Generalmajor Wilhelm Süssmann	Geschwaderkommodore of Kampfgeschwader 55; 7 March 1940 – 14 August 1940	Succeeded by Oberstleutnant Hans Korte
