= Friedrich Kless =

- Born: 7 October 1906
- Died: 6 April 1994 (aged 87)
- Military career
- Allegiance: Nazi Germany
- Branch: Luftwaffe
- Rank: Generalmajor
- Commands: II./Kampfgeschwader 55
- Conflicts: World War II
- Awards: Knight's Cross of the Iron Cross

Friedrich Kless (7 October 1906 – 6 April 1994) was a German general during World War II. He was a recipient of the Knight's Cross of the Iron Cross.

== Awards and decorations ==
- Knight's Cross of the Iron Cross on 14 October 1940 as Major and Gruppenkommandeur of the II./Kampfgeschwader 55
- German Cross in Gold on 12 January 1943 as Oberstleutnant im Generalstab (in the General Staff) of Luftwaffen-Kommando Ost

Military offices
Preceded by Oberleutnant Otto von Lachemair	Gruppenkommandeur of II./Kampfgeschwader 55; 28 July 1940 – 28 October 1940	Succeeded by Major Hans-Joachim Gabriel
