= Chyornaya River =

Chyornaya River or Chorna River (Ukrainian: Чорна річк, romanized: Chorna Richka; Russian: Чёрная река, romanized: Chyornaya Reka; sometimes Russian: Чёрная речка, romanized: Chyornaya Rechka), literally "Black River", is a common name for many rivers in Russia and Ukraine.

The Russian name (Russian: Чёрная, Black) is often transliterated as Chernaya, and alternatively as Chyornaya or Chornaya, which are closer to the true pronunciation.

- Chyornaya (Crimea), a river in Crimea, Ukraine, also known as the Chorhun, Chornaya or Tchornaya River
- Chyornaya (Veslyana), a tributary of the Veslyana in Perm Krai and Komi Republic, Russia
- Chyornaya Rechka (Saint Petersburg), a small river in Saint Petersburg, also known as the Black River, famous for being the place of the duel of Alexander Pushkin and Georges d'Anthès
- Chyornaya (Shilka tributary)

== See also ==
- Chyornaya rechka
