= Kampfgruppe 100 =

Combat Group 100
- Kampfgruppe 100
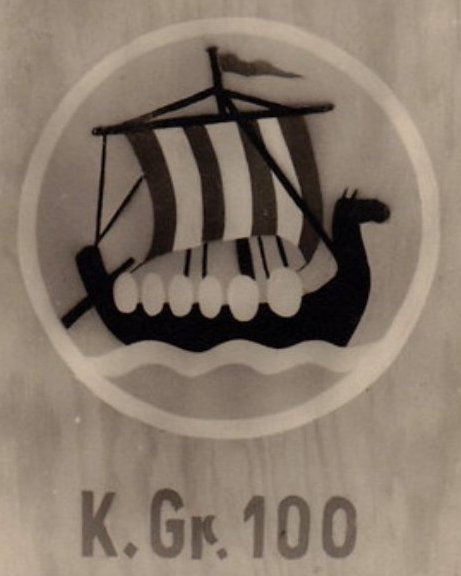
- Country: Nazi Germany
- Branch: Luftwaffe

Kampfgruppe 100 (KGr 100) was a specialist unit of the Luftwaffe during the early stages of World War II. It is best known as the first unit to use the "pathfinder" concept, with its aircraft being equipped with the latest radio navigation aids to find their targets and then dropping flares on them to mark the target for the following bombers.

The unit first formed out of parts of Luftnachrichten Abteilung 100 at Köthen on 18 November 1939 with a HQ unit and two squadrons, 1./ and 2./KGr 100. In keeping with typical Luftwaffe organization, Kampfgruppe 100 was later expanded to three squadrons, all flying the Heinkel He 111H.

On 15 December 1941 the unit was used as the basis for the greatly expanded Kampfgeschwader 100, becoming I.Gruppe/KG 100.

The distinguishing alphanumeric Geschwaderkennung code for both KGr 100 and its later wing-sized successor unit was 6N.
