= Alois Lindmayr =

Oberst in the Luftwaffe during World War II

- Born: 19 September 1901; Laibach, Austria-Hungary (now Ljubljana, Slovenia)
- Died: 17 July 1965 (aged 63); Enns, Austria
- Military career
- Allegiance: Austria First Republic (to 1938); Nazi Germany (to 1945); Austria
- Branch: Luftwaffe
- Service years: 1925–1945
- Commands: 7./KG 76, I./KG 76
- Conflicts: World War II: Invasion of Poland; Battle of France; Air raid on Rennes; Battle of Britain; Battle of Britain Day
- Awards: Knight's Cross of the Iron Cross

Alois Lindmayr (19 September 1901 – 17 July 1965) was a highly decorated Oberst in the Luftwaffe during World War II. He was also a recipient of the Knight's Cross of the Iron Cross. The Knight's Cross of the Iron Cross, and its variants were the highest awards in the military and paramilitary forces of Nazi Germany during World War II.

After World War II Lindmayr rejoined the military service of the Austrian Armed Forces (Bundesheer) as a civil servant, holding the rank of an Amtsrat. He was unable to join the Bundesheer as an officer because he had held too high a rank (Oberst— Colonel) during the Third Reich.

== Early life and career ==
Lindmayr was born on 19 September 1901 in Laibach, the in Austria-Hungary present-day Ljubljana in Slovenia. He was the son of a military officer and aviator. Following graduation from school, Lindmayr became a bank teller with the Wiener Giro- und Cassen-Verein. In 1925, he joined the military service of the Austrian Armed Forces (Bundesheer), initially serving with Radfahrbataillon 2, a bicycle infantry battalion. In 1927, Lindmayr was accepted for officer training at the military academy in Enns, present-day the Heeresunteroffiziersakademie the non-commissioned officer academy of the Austrian Armed Forces. In 1930, he was promoted to Leutnant (second lieutenant) and following the Anschluss in March 1938, the incorporation of Austria into Nazi Germany, Gollob was transferred to the Luftwaffe (the Nazi German Air Force).

Lindmayr was promoted to Hauptmann (captain) on 1 June 1938. On 1 November, he was appointed Staffelkapitän (squadron leader) of 7. Staffel (7th squadron) of Kampfgeschwader 158 (KG 158—158th Bomber Wing), a unit which was based at Wels Airfield and became Kampfgeschwader 76 (KG 76—76th Bomber Wing) on 1 May 1939.

== World War II ==
Lindmayr fought during the Polish Campaign and Battle of France in KG 76, flying Dornier Do 17 light bombers. During the French campaign he replaced Major Ludwig Schulz as Gruppenkommandeur (Group Commander) of I. Gruppe (group) Kampfgeschwader 76 (I./KG 76) on 3 June 1940. It is unclear when he departed. It seems that he may have led the unit until 7 September 1940, or if not, later that month. He was succeeded by Hauptmann Walter Herbold. Lyndmayr led his unit during an air raid on a concentration of Allied troops at the marshalling yards in Rennes, on 17 June 1940, where a thousand railway cars were destroyed and several hundreds of French and British soldiers lost their lives.

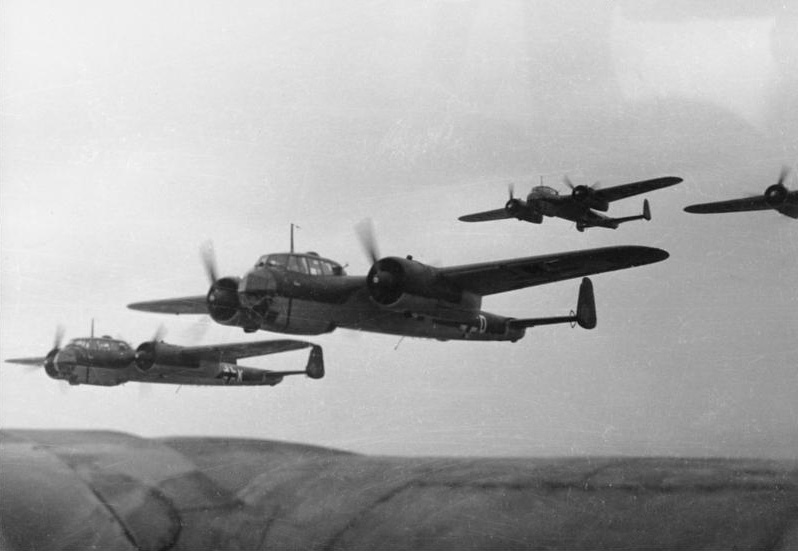
Dornier Do 17s. These aircraft were flown by KG 76.

Lindmayr's most distinct action was leading two gruppen of KG 76 bombers in a raid to London on Sunday 15 September 1940 during the Battle of Britain. The day was the climax of the Battle of Britain, and became known as the Battle of Britain Day.

Lindmayr led his Dornier unit into the heart of London despite heavy attacks by RAF Fighter Command. He held his unit in formation losing eight of his 27 bombers. His experience and discipline prevented his unit suffering greater losses. In the battle, KG 76's escort, numbering some 120 Messerschmitt Bf 109s, were heavily outnumbered by RAF fighters making his leadership even more essential to the survival of his formations.

Lindmayr was commander of the pilot school 123 (Flugzeugführerschule 123) in Graz-Thalerhof between February and October 1944. Not much training at this time was possible due to the fuel shortage at this stage of the war. Shortly before the end of World War II he was promoted to Oberst and made commander of the pilot school at Kaufbeuren. In this function he organized the non-hostile surrender of the city to American Forces.

== Later life ==
In mid-1946, Lindmayr was released from captivity. He then found employment with a chemical company in Linz. On 1 May 1955, Lindmayr became a technical employee with the building authority of Upper Austria. This was done to facilitate a possible reactivation for a new Bundesheer (Austrian Armed Forces). Lindmayr had always hoped to rejoin the military service following the end of the war and he always openly stated these ambitions.

Lindmayr died on 17 July 1965 at the age of 63 in Enns, Austria.

== Awards and decorations ==
- Iron Cross (1939)
  - 2nd Class (20 September 1939)
  - 1st Class (23 May 1940)
- Knight's Cross of the Iron Cross on 21 July 1940 as Hauptmann and Staffelkapitän of the 7./Kampfgeschwader 76
