= General Schulz =

General Schulz may refer to:

- Adelbert Schulz (1903–1944), German Wehrmacht major general
- Erwin Schulz (1900–1981), German SS brigadier general
- Friedrich Schulz (1897–1976), German Wehrmacht general
- Johannes Schulz (1892–1943), German Wehrmacht major general (posthumously promoted)
- Karl-Heinrich Schulz (1906–1986), German Luftwaffe major general
- Karl-Lothar Schulz (1907–1972), German Luftwaffe major general
- Ludwig Schulz (1896–1966), German Luftwaffe major general

== See also ==
- Fritz von Scholz (1896–1944), Waffen-SS lieutenant general
- Georg Scholze (1897–1945), German Wehrmacht major general
- Franz-Joseph Schulze (1918–2005), German Army general
- Werner Schulze (1895–1966), German Wehrmacht major general
- General Schultz (disambiguation)
