= General Schultz =

General Schultz may refer to:

- Harald Schultz (1895–1957), German Wehrmacht major general
- Paul Schultz (1891–1964), German Wehrmacht major general
- Roger C. Schultz (born 1945), U.S. Army lieutenant general

== See also ==
- Gerd Schultze-Rhonhof (born 1939), German Army major general
- Richard Scholtes (born 1934), U.S. Army major general
- Friedrich von Scholtz (1851–1927), Imperial German Army general
- General Schulz (disambiguation)
