= Battle of Britain Day =

Day remembering the Battle of Britain on 15 September 1940

- Part of the Battle of Britain of World War II
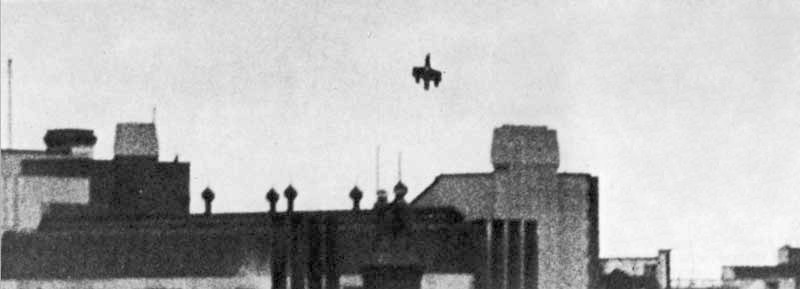
- Dornier Do 17 of Kampfgeschwader 76 falling on Victoria Station
Date	15 September 1940
Location	London, England and English Channel
Result	British victory

Belligerents
United Kingdom	Germany

Commanders and leaders
(United Kingdom) Hugh Dowding; (United Kingdom) Keith Park	(Nazi Germany) Hermann Göring; (Nazi Germany) Albert Kesselring

Units involved
(United Kingdom) Fighter Command	(Nazi Germany) Luftflotte 2

Strength
630 fighter aircraft	1,120 aircraft (620 fighters and 500 bombers)

Casualties and losses
29 aircraft destroyed; c. 21 damaged; 14 – c. 16 killed; 14 wounded; 1 captured	58 aircraft destroyed; 20 severely damaged; 63–81 killed; 63–65 captured; 30–31 wounded; 21 missing

On 15 September 1940, during the Second World War, an air battle was fought during the Battle of Britain between the German Luftwaffe and the Royal Air Force (RAF). Now celebrated as Battle of Britain Day, on that date, the Luftwaffe launched its largest and most concentrated attack against London in order to force the RAF into a battle of annihilation. The German objective was to gain air superiority over the English Channel and allow the invasion of England, Operation Sea Lion, to proceed.

During the course of the day, around 1,500 aircraft took part in the air battles. The action was the climax of the Battle of Britain. The RAF's Fighter Command defeated the German raids; the Luftwaffe formations were dispersed by a large cloud base and failed to inflict severe damage on the city of London. In the aftermath of the raid, Operation Sea Lion was postponed. Having been defeated in daylight, the Luftwaffe turned its attention to the Blitz night campaign, which lasted until May 1941.

== Background ==
By June 1940, Nazi Germany had conquered most of Western Europe and much of Scandinavia. At that time, the only major power standing in the way of a German-dominated Europe was Great Britain. In the absence of offers of peace from the British, Adolf Hitler ordered the Luftwaffe (German Air Force) to destroy the RAF in order to gain air superiority or air supremacy as a prelude to launching Operation Sea Lion, an amphibious assault by the Heer (German Army) onto the British mainland. Advised that the Kriegsmarine (German Navy) would not be ready until mid-August, Hitler wanted to mount the invasion on or around 25 August. Much later and weather conditions would not be favourable.

The Battle of Britain began on 10 July, when the first Luftwaffe bomber fleets began attacking convoys and Royal Navy forces in English ports and the Channel. The results were positive and the Germans succeeded in forcing the British to redirect shipping to ports in north-eastern Britain. The Luftwaffe then began the second phase, codenamed Unternehmen Adlerangriff ("Operation Eagle Attack"), of its air offensive, attacking RAF airfields and supporting structures on the British mainland. On 12 August, it flew the first missions of this phase. The next day, the Luftwaffe carried out its largest attack to date on the mainland. Christened Adlertag ("Eagle Day"), the attack was not a success and the RAF airfields damaged were in action again within hours.

Hitler was dissatisfied with the Luftwaffe's lack of progress and had already postponed Operation Sealion to late September after being advised the Kriegsmarine needed more preparation time. Prompted by an RAF raid on Berlin in late August, he ordered the Luftwaffe to concentrate its attacks upon London. It was thought the move would draw Fighter Command into a large, decisive battle. Initially, this strategy caught the British off-guard. The first daylight attack of this type occurred on 7 September and caused extensive damage to shipping and some 1,600 civilians were killed or injured. Over the next few days, bad weather prevented more large attacks. On 9 and 11 September, only smaller raids were carried out. The respite gave Air Chief Marshal Hugh Dowding, commander of RAF Fighter Command, the chance to prepare and reinforce his forces.

== German strategy ==
On 14 September, Hitler and his command met to discuss the proposed invasion of England. Reichsmarschall Hermann Göring, the commander of the Luftwaffe, was not present at the meeting; he was inspecting Luftwaffe units in France. A subordinate, Generalfeldmarschall Erhard Milch, replaced him. Hitler praised the attacks which had caused heavy damage to the RAF and London, noting they may have been more effective had there been better weather. Nevertheless, he dismissed over-optimistic reports from the Oberkommando der Luftwaffe (OKL or High Command of the Air Force), particularly the Chief of the Luftwaffe general staff, General der Flieger Hans Jeschonnek, who asserted the RAF was on its last legs. The Luftwaffe did not have air superiority and due to this, Operation Sea Lion could not proceed for the time being. Großadmiral Erich Raeder, commander-in-chief of the Kriegsmarine, agreed and argued the invasion was a last resort regardless of gaining air superiority.

Hitler decided to defer his decision whether to commence Operation Sea Lion until 17 September. This gave four days for the Wehrmacht to prepare for the next phase of favourable tides commencing on 21 September. In the meantime, to maintain pressure on Britain, Hitler wanted to bomb military targets in London. However, Jeschonnek considered that this would not significantly affect morale among the civilian population. The primary residential areas of London were some distance from the military facilities that Hitler wanted the Luftwaffe to focus on. The bombing of population centres was considered, but Hitler refused to allow these to be attacked, for the time being at least.

== Planning ==
To date, the Luftwaffe's attacks on London appeared to suggest to German intelligence that the RAF was close to collapse. The bomber crews did not encounter the robust defence that had characterised the battles in August. By striking against vital choke points in London that the RAF would be forced to defend, the Luftwaffe had the opportunity to destroy the remaining RAF fighters. This would achieve the desired air superiority, and eliminate a vital rail network, destroy shipping and supplies brought in from North America, and affect civilian morale by demonstrating London's vulnerability to air power.

A period of good weather was predicted for France, Belgium and southern Britain on 15 September. Accordingly, the Luftwaffe prepared for an attack on this date along the lines set by Hitler. Staff officers of Luftflotte 2 based in Brussels began planning for a two-pronged attack. The targets for the first prong was the network of railway tracks, which in some areas were 12 abreast and included "choke points" in the form of vulnerable rail-over-rail bridges, in the Battersea district. These tracks linked London to the West Midlands and other industrial cities in the north of Britain. The target for the second attack, which was to be larger than the first and scheduled for the afternoon, was the dock areas of the Thames Estuary including the warehouses of the East End of London, Surrey Commercial Docks, south of the river, and the various Royal Docks of the London Docklands, to the north.

The strike against London meant that most of the fighting on 15 September would take place between Luftflotte 2 under Albert Kesselring and Air Vice Marshal Keith Park's No. 11 Group.

== British strategy ==
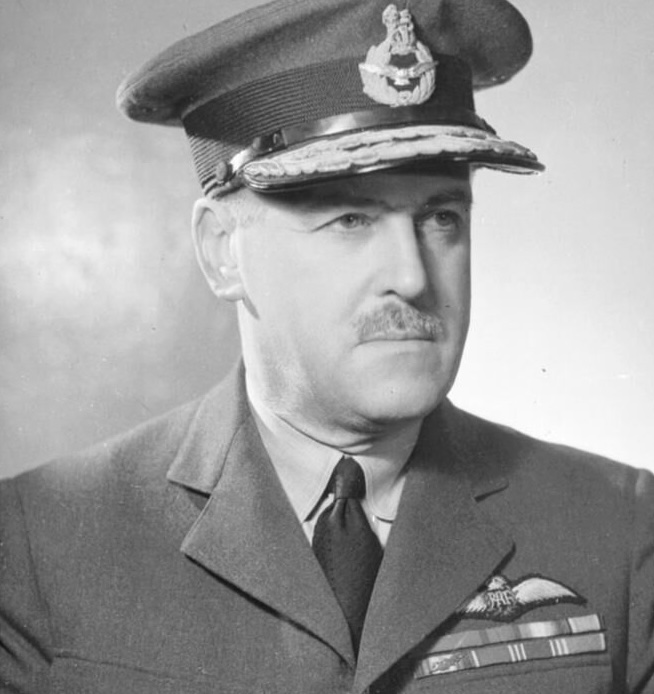
Trafford Leigh-Mallory

No. 11 Group covered the southeast corner of England, from a line extending northwest from near Southampton, on the south coast, to Aylesbury, in Buckinghamshire, and then approximately northwest across to Lowestoft. The group's sector stations were Northolt, to the west of London, North Weald and Debden to London's north with Debden closer to No. 11 Group's boundary with its northern neighbour, No. 12 Group, and Hornchurch to London's east. Biggin Hill and Kenley were to the south of London.

Dowding saw No. 12 Group in the role of the protector of the Midlands and a reserve for No. 11 Group. However, Air Vice Marshal Trafford Leigh-Mallory, commanding No. 12 Group, was frustrated with the way in which his squadrons were being used in the Battle of Britain. During the Luftwaffe attacks on southeast England, the squadrons of No. 12 Group were tasked with protecting No. 11 Group sector stations north of the Thames Estuary. However Leigh-Mallory believed his units should be in action south of the Thames. He was also critical of the way Park and Dowding were conducting the battle.

Squadron Leader Douglas Bader, commander of No. 242 Squadron, one of the units of No. 12 Group, was keen for a greater involvement in the fighting to the south. With the support of Leigh-Mallory, he advocated scrambling No. 12 Group squadrons as soon as German aircraft were detected forming up over France or Belgium, arguing that the RAF fighters were quick enough to reach 20,000 ft (6,100 m) over the Thames Estuary before the enemy reached the area. He planned to use three to five squadrons in a 'Big Wing' formation to engage the enemy. Should this succeed, No. 11 Group, following up attacks, might have found broken enemy formations whose crews had lost the determination to press on to their targets. Bader implied that this might reduce the losses of fighter pilots in No. 11 Group.

Leigh-Mallory wanted to ignore the protective and reserve role envisaged by Dowding for No. 12 Group in order to commit it to battle. While this method might have spared No. 11 Group, the Big Wing tactic had its problems. The amount of time it took to position such a large formation for interception meant that the Big Wing often failed to prevent bombing raids on No. 11 Group's airfields. Instead, they engaged the bombers as they withdrew. Leigh-Mallory accepted this and argued that it did not matter when an interception was made, as long as it accounted for a large number of enemy aircraft. The rationale was that the resulting losses, expected to be significant, would act as a deterrent. Damage sustained on an occasion when the Germans did get through would have to be offset against later occasions when they did not even care to try.

Park, with endorsement from Dowding, took the view it was unimportant to inflict large losses on the Germans in comparison to safeguarding his own forces. The airfields themselves supported the squadrons in the field, while the loss of the vital sector-stations could well have crippled the defence system. Thus the possibility of allowing the bulk of the German bombers to reach their target unscathed was unacceptable. Park believed the Germans would give up if they could not achieve their aim of air superiority. This meant avoiding the destruction and/or depletion of Fighter Command, as it was the primary factor in England's air defence. This would be achieved by sending small numbers of fighters to intercept, minimising losses in the air. By remaining to offer undiminished and constant air opposition, the RAF ensured the Luftwaffe could not win. As long as some sort of cost was imposed before the enemy dropped his bombs and impaired the defence system, the RAF could remain intact to meet the threat again the next day. This strategy would encourage an enemy to give up if he felt he was getting nowhere. Even while enemy losses remained moderate, it would be senseless to suffer those casualties for no return. Park and Dowding's strategy, under the circumstances, was the wiser choice.

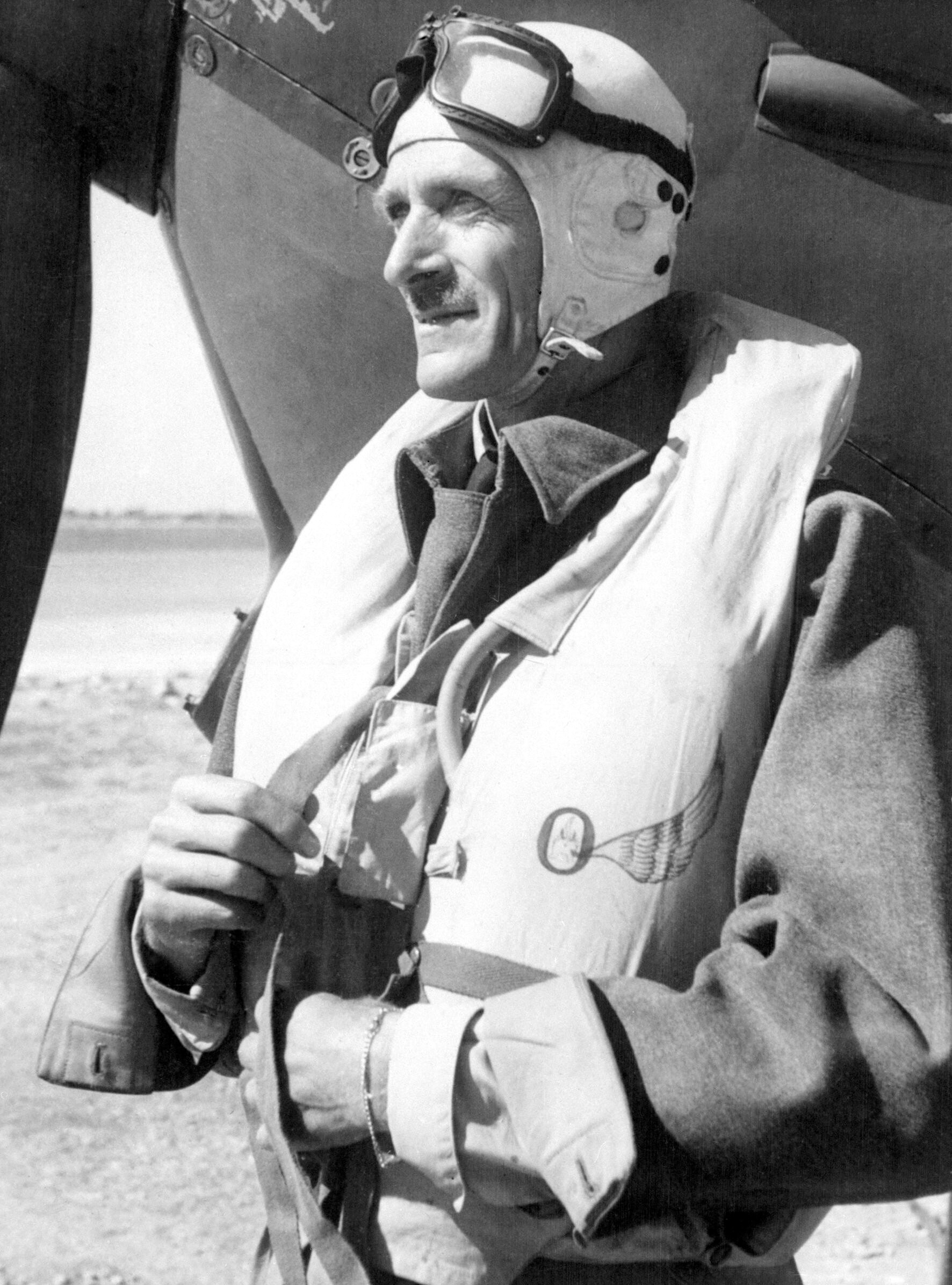
Keith Park

== Forces involved ==
=== Luftwaffe forces ===
The Luftwaffe had suffered heavy attrition since the beginning of the Battle of Britain. Just over a month earlier, on 17 August, it had possessed 2,226 operational aircraft. By 7 September, it had 1,895 aircraft, a drop of 15 percent. Still, most of the losses were being made good by production. During the battle, the Luftwaffe had undergone a major reorganisation. Luftflotte 5 in Norway had sent most of its Messerschmitt Bf 110 and medium bomber units (Kampfgeschwader or Bomber Wings) to Luftflotte 2 and 3. Luftflotte 3 then passed most of its Messerschmitt Bf 109 units to Luftflotte 2, which was based in the Netherlands, Belgium and France.

According to the Luftwaffe order of battle dated 7 September, the nearest date covered by the list, the three Air Fleets contained 1,895 aircraft. Luftflotte 2 had 1,311 machines, including 533 Bf 109s, 107 Bf 110s, 51 reconnaissance and 484 medium bomber aircraft. A further 120 Junkers Ju 87 dive bombers were on the order of battle, but were not used.

Luftwaffe readiness was less than ideal. In August, 211 pilots had been killed, including 105 fighter pilots and 91 bomber pilots. Missing pilots amounted to 132 fighter and 94 bomber pilots alone, with a further respective loss of 47 and 28 wounded. The effect on operation-ready crews was significant. Messerschmitt Bf 110 units had 60% of crews against authorised strength. For bomber units, it was 65%, while Bf 109 units had 81% of crews ready, a 5% increase from the 76% level in the first week of September. However, by 14 September, Bf 109 units possessed only 67% of crews against authorised aircraft. In Bf 110 units, it fell to just 46%, and in bomber units it dropped to 59%. One week later, the figures were 64, 52 and 52% respectively.

=== RAF forces ===
In the six weeks of intensive combat, RAF strength had been maintained to an extent far greater than the Luftwaffe intelligence had believed possible. On the evening of 14 September, Fighter Command could muster 269 Supermarine Spitfire and 533 Hawker Hurricane fighters. The two key groups could put up just over 500 fighters: No. 11 Group had 310 fighters, including 92 Spitfires and 218 Hurricanes; No. 12 Group could field 85 Spitfires and 109 Hurricanes. Should No. 10 Group come into the battle, a further 48 Spitfires and 78 Hurricanes could be committed. Compared with 17 August, there were just 22 fewer Spitfires and Hurricanes.

During the battle, the RAF had suffered a serious loss of experienced pilots. In mid-September, Fighter Command could call upon 1,492 operational pilots against an establishment of 1,662 – a deficiency of 10%. Many of the pilots were ineffective unless led into battle by experienced men. Dowding's policy was to move in fresh squadrons from quieter areas to replace losses in the units in the south-east as they became exhausted. By early September, the system was breaking down as squadrons were becoming depleted before fresh units could be formed and take their place.

Reluctantly, Dowding defined three categories, A, B and C. Category A units were to bear the brunt of the fighting, and were to be kept at full strength in aircraft and pilots. Only if the A units suffered exceptionally high losses would they be replaced. B units were relief units, to be maintained at operational strength and only used if absolutely necessary. C units were generally stripped down to just five or six pilots. These units were devoted to training new pilots. Although not fit for fighter-fighter action, they could defend quieter areas. The system potentially could have had fatal results for Fighter Command, with C units becoming less and less effective but the system had not been running long enough by 14 September for it to have a serious impact on Fighter Command's strength. The replacement units were sufficient in number and effectiveness to continue to replace exhausted units. By 15 September, the C units could still give a good account of themselves in battle.

== Prelude ==
The Luftwaffe began its eighth consecutive night of bombing London on 15 September. Soon after midnight, 13 Dornier Do 17 light bombers attacked the capital. At 00:15 two Junkers Ju 88s followed from Kampfgeschwader 51 (KG 51, or 51st Bomber Wing). A further 11 Heinkel He 111s from an unidentified unit bombed the city again at 00:50. At 02:00, five He 111s from Kampfgeschwader 4 (KG 4) bombed the city. A full strike by KG 4 had been planned, but bad weather had forced a cancellation after five He 111s had taken off. Most of the damage was done to residential areas in Fulham, Chelsea and Westminster. Around 19 people were killed and 31 injured, mostly as a result of a bomb striking a church in Chelsea. Additionally, Cardiff, Leicester, Ipswich and Bootle were bombed although by fewer aircraft. Only the latter target received much in the way of damage, to rail facilities at West Alexandra Dock.

At sea, a Heinkel He 115 floatplane attacked and sank the 5,548-long-ton (5,637 t) freighter Mailsea River off Montrose with a torpedo. Soon after, the freighter Halland was sunk by the same method in the area. At 03:30, He 115s flew up the Thames Estuary and dropped magnetic anti-shipping mines. More were dropped in the Bristol Channel, Liverpool Bay and Milford Haven and off Hartlepool, Berwick-upon-Tweed and Aberdeen. At this stage of the war, Britain's night-fighter defences were relatively crude and available radar equipment was limited and not fitted to most fighters anyway. Instead, they flew outside the anti-aircraft guns' fields of fire on likely approach routes using the pilots' vision to locate enemy aircraft. Just 28 sorties were flown against the nocturnal raids.

The first daylight combat of 15 September began just after 08:00. A He 111 from Aufklärungsgruppe 51 (Long-range Reconnaissance Group 51), based near Paris, was shot down over the Channel by Hurricanes from No. 87 Squadron. A Heinkel He 59 air-sea rescue aircraft was dispatched, but found no trace of the He 111 or its crew. Further flights were made by high altitude Ju 88s. One photographed RAF Sealand, RAF Pembrey and RAF Woodward. It also managed to reach Manchester, Liverpool and Birkenhead without interception. Another managed to photograph Thames Haven, RAF Netheravon, RAF Benson and the Royal Navy base at Chatham Dockyard. Interception of these high altitude aircraft was difficult, and none were lost on 15 September.

== Noon attack: 10:10 to 13:00 ==
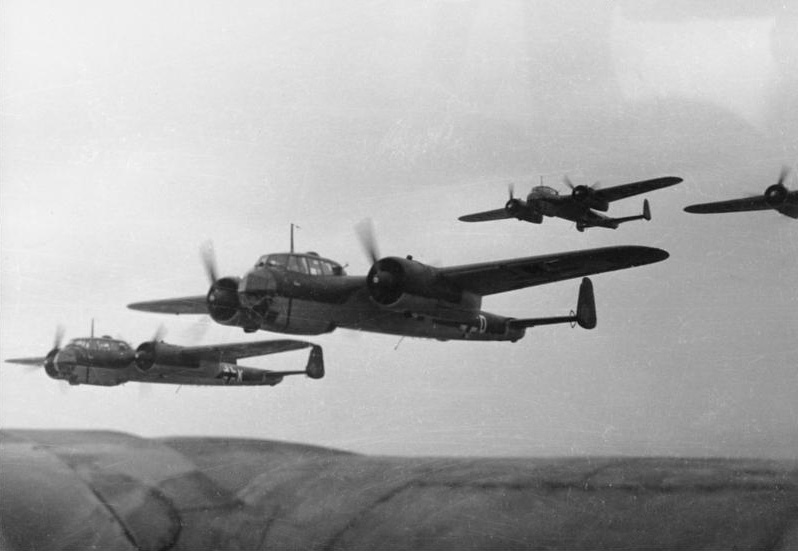
Dornier Do 17s; these aircraft were flown by KG 76

The offensive got under way at 10:10 in the morning, with 19 Do 17s of III Gruppe (Group) of KG 76 taking off from their base at Cormeilles-en-Vexin, with its commander, the experienced combat veteran Major Alois Lindmayr, leading the entire formation. At the same time, 20 mi (32 km) to the north, the I Gruppe of KG 76 took off. Usually a Gruppe (Group) could field 27 bombers. After weeks of attrition, I./KG 76 could put up only eight Do 17s: the Geschwader had to field two Gruppen to do the work of one. Most of the Dorniers were in bad shape, worn down by intensive operations. The two groups rendezvoused at Amiens then proceeded to Cap Gris Nez to pick up their Bf 109 fighter escort. As it ascended the formation broke up in cloud and was delayed for 10 minutes to allow reforming. Two bombers failed to do so and returned to base.

Mindful of their recent losses to the RAF, Luftwaffe crews experimented with innovative ways to defend themselves. One pilot, Feldwebel Rolf Heitsch, had his Dornier fitted with a flame thrower in its tail. If it was successful in driving off fighters or at least forcing them to keep their distance, other bombers were to be provided with the same equipment.

=== British reaction ===
As the Luftwaffe force assembled, Prime Minister Winston Churchill arrived at the operations room at RAF Uxbridge for a visit. He would observe the day's events from a viewing gallery overlooking the plotting tables. There was little activity aside from a few plots indicating German reconnaissance machines and pursuing RAF fighters being moved by WAAFs, personnel of the Women's Auxiliary Air Force. However, at 11:04 the first German aircraft, Lindmayr's Dorniers, had reached Calais and triggered the alarm at Chain Home radar station at Dover. The filter room at RAF Bentley Priory recognised the formation as hostile and this information was transmitted to the various operations rooms at Fighter Command's group and sector commands throughout the south that 40-plus enemy aircraft were entering Kentish airspace. Park's initial response was to order Biggin Hill's Nos. 92 and 72 Squadrons to be scrambled with instructions to cover the air space over Canterbury at 25,000 ft (7,600 m).

Over the following minutes, Wing Commander Lord Willoughby de Broke, Park's senior fighter controller, watched with the Prime Minister and Park as the Germans moved closer. It was not possible to determine which plots represented bombers and fighters; the former had to be intercepted so as to disrupt the approach to their targets while the latter could be disregarded. The interception had to be timed with care so that once scrambled, the RAF fighters had enough time to get into a favourable attack position. However, a premature scramble could see the fighters run short of fuel before they met the enemy. Furthermore, although the target seemed to be London, the approaching German force, now believed to be at least 120 aircraft, could be fighters sent as decoys to clear the skies or disrupt fighter defences. After a discussion with de Broke, Park decided to send nine squadrons into action at 11:15.

Squadrons from RAF Northolt, RAF Kenley and RAF Debden were placed on stand by. At 11:20, Park ordered fighters from RAF Hornchurch and RAF North Weald, and from No. 10 Group's RAF Middle Wallop, into the air. He now had two squadrons over Canterbury, four over Biggin Hill and Maidstone with further back up of two squadrons over Chelmsford at 15,000 ft (4,600 m).

The plan was for the two squadrons from Biggin Hill to engage the high escort. No. 603 Squadron would arrive on the scene just afterward and get at the close escort. The pair from North Weald would go to Maidstone, so if the bombers got through, they would run into them over London. Despite Park's reservations about Leigh-Mallory's Big Wing, he ordered that it was time for it to be tested. If the Germans attempted to use the Thames Estuary as a navigation aid, as they often did, fighters from No. 12 Group's RAF Duxford could meet them over Hornchurch at 20,000 ft (6,100 m). They would have a 5,000 ft (1,500 m) height advantage to the west of the bombers and attack out of the sun, if Leigh-Mallory could get them there in time. The order was sent to Stanmore at 11:20 and Duxford scrambled Nos. 19, 310, 302 and No. 611 Squadrons. Bader's No. 242 Squadron was also scrambled and he led the assembled Duxford Wing, composed of 56 fighters, to Gravesend. They were airborne at 11:22.

=== Close to contact ===
The Dorniers were supported by German fighter aircraft that had been sent out in advance of the main strike. Jagdgeschwader 27 (JG 27) and I./Jagdgeschwader 52 (JG 52) Bf 109s flew in toward London at 16,000 ft (4,900 m), while Jagdgeschwader 53 (JG 53) flew top cover over the bombers. Some 30 Jagdgeschwader 3 (JG 3) flew close escort. The bombers were travelling slowly, forcing the fighters to lower their flaps to stay with the bombers, which made them easy targets. They crossed the coast at Folkestone at 11:36. Fighter-bombers from II.Lehrgeschwader 2 (Demonstration Wing 2) were also to form part of the escort, flying ahead of the main force to drop 550 lb (250 kg) bombs and then resume their role as fighters. The strong head wind slowed the Dorniers, so they took longer than expected to reach the target while burning up the Bf 109s' limited fuel supplies. Conversely, the wind favoured the RAF fighters coming in from the north.

LG 2 took off as the bombers crossed the English coast. Even with bombs, the Bf 109s were expected to overtake the bombers and attack London a few minutes before the main raids began. Park interpreted the LG 2 raid as a major thrust and was determined to meet the "second wave" as he saw it. He scrambled six more squadrons but kept four reserve squadrons at Hornchurch and RAF Tangmere. As the forces closed, around 120 Bf 109s and 25 Do 17s were facing 245 Spitfires and Hurricanes.

=== Combat ===
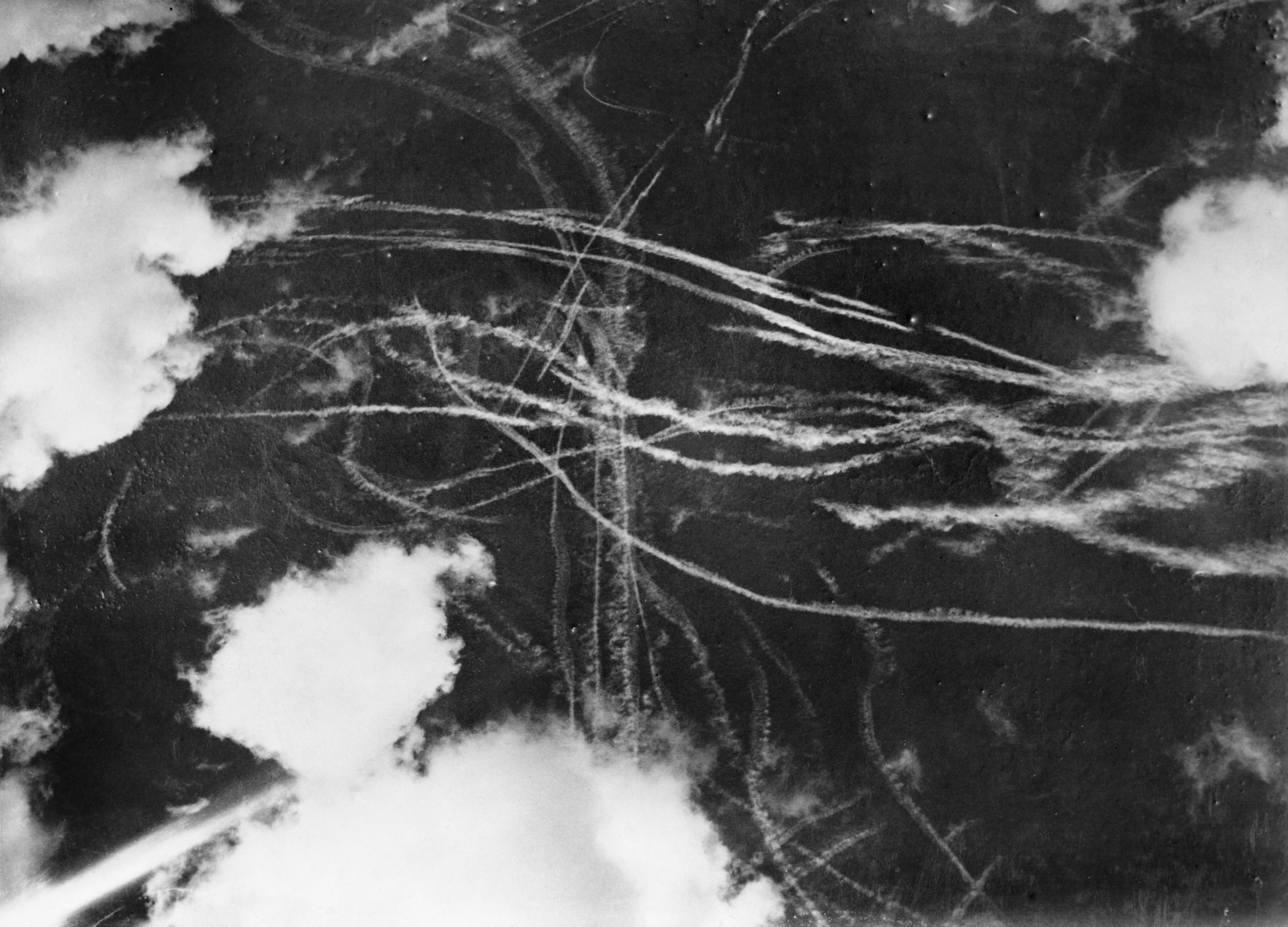
An air battle, 1940

Park's plan worked. Nos. 72 and 92 Squadrons, from Biggin Hill, made contact with the enemy over Canterbury. Arriving at 25,000 ft (7,600 m), they found themselves 3,000 ft (910 m) above the top covering German fighters (JG 53). Beyond Canterbury, they could also see KG 76 and JG 3 over Ashford. At 11:50, they attacked out of the sun. Taken by surprise, four or five of I./JG 53's Bf 109s were hit by the Spitfires. Spitfires of No. 92 Squadron tried to charge through the fighter screen to get at the Dorniers but were blocked. Soon afterwards, No. 603 Squadron joined the fight. Park had broken up the top level escort. Some 23 Hurricanes of Nos. 253 and 501 Squadrons arrived at the same height as the bombers and delivered a head-on attack. Lindmayr's crews were experienced and the formation held its nerve and remained intact. JG 3 in turn attacked the Hurricanes, dispatching two from 501 Squadron. Northolt's Nos. 229 and No. 303 Squadrons were also arriving and engaged JG 52, with a Hurricane and Bf 109 colliding. The bombers ploughed on and reached Lewisham. However, the formation was now isolated. The escorts were embroiled in dogfights all over Kent and half the RAF fighters were yet to engage. JG 53 were further engaged by Nos. 1, 46, 249 and 605 Squadrons, with the latter able to break through and score some hits on the bombers. JG 27, meanwhile, suffered two casualties, one possibly against No. 19 Squadron. It claimed only one British fighter that day. JG 3 claimed two fighters for one loss.

Up until that point, the Bf 109s had successfully blocked attacks on the bombers. However, Park's tactics of attacking the Germans all along the route forced their fighters to use up fuel more quickly in dogfights. When the outskirts of London came into view, at 12:07, the Bf 109s began to break away and commence their return to France.

The North Weald squadrons, Nos. 504 and 257, engaged the Dorniers with 20 Hurricanes. One German pilot, Feldwebel Robert Zehbe, developed engine trouble and lagged half a mile behind the main bomber stream. His Dornier attracted a swarm of fighters. Eventually Ray Holmes of No. 504 Squadron, out of bullets, rammed the bomber, sending it into a dive. The Dornier's tail separated and its wings snapped off outboard of the engines. The bomber crashed onto the forecourt of London Victoria station. While diving, its bombs became detached and hit or landed near Buckingham Palace, damaging the building. Zehbe bailed out, landed near The Oval, and was severely wounded by a civilian mob. He was rescued by the British Army but died of his wounds. Holmes' Hurricane was badly damaged and crashed in the streets of Chelsea while Holmes bailed out injured, but survived.

Bader's Duxford Wing arrived directly over the target, and attacked while the Germans were on the bomb-run. Thirty seconds after the release of the bombs, they hit the target area, the Battersea rail lines next to Battersea Park on the Thames south bank. Each Dornier's payload of twenty 110 lb (50 kg) bombs carved a run 500 yd (460 m) long and 25 yd (23 m) wide. Some fell on the high-density civilian housing. The bombs missed Clapham Junction but fell across the rail network tracks that connected it to Victoria station north of the Thames and the main line heading north east on the south side of the river. The bombs cut the tracks in Battersea in several places, and a viaduct collapsed over some rails. Rail traffic was halted. Four unexploded bombs delayed repairs, but the rail lines were only out of action for three days.

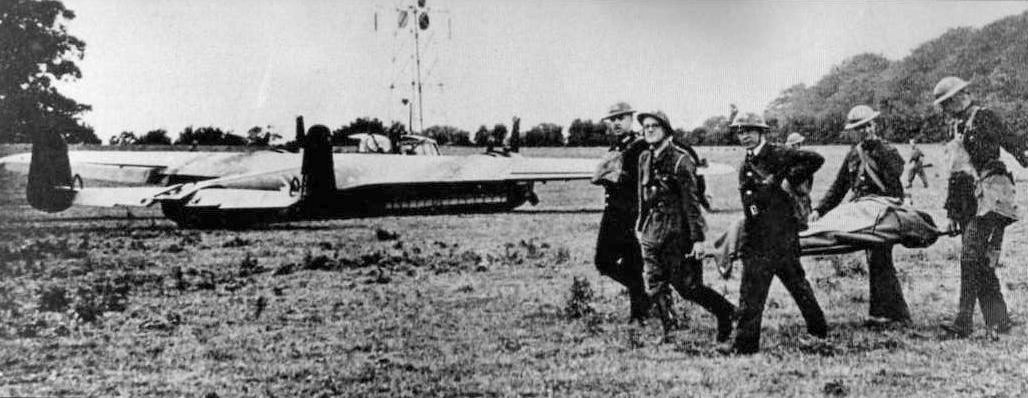
Rudolf Heitsch's Dornier in Castle Farm Shoreham. The flame throwing device is just visible on the aft fuselage.

Within minutes, the Do 17 formation had been reduced to 15 aircraft, most of which were damaged. Six had been shot down and four were attempting to make a run for home. The remainder dropped their bombs and were met by a covering force of Bf 109s and landed back in France without further combat. Meanwhile, Park decided to ignore the raid by LG 2. LG 2 saw one rail station, released their bombs, and returned home, seeing only one British fighter, No. 46 Squadron's Pilot Officer Gunning, who reported the make up of the formation.

The British claimed 81 aircraft, 26 by the Duxford Wing, although this was clearly an instance of overclaiming. For example, Zehbe's Dornier was the subject of nine separate claims. In actual fact, the attackers lost six bombers and twelve Bf 109s, some 12.5% of its strength. Among the German casualties that day was Rolf Heitsch and his flame-throwing Dornier: the device had not been tested at high altitude and, when used, squirted black oil over Holmes' windshield. Still, the operation had been a victory for the RAF despite the loss of 13 of its fighters. Eight were claimed by JG 52.

== Interlude: 13:00 to 13:45 ==
At 13:00, the German formations were plotted making their way back to France. Churchill was delighted with the results. The WAAF had been due to change shift, but the scheduled relief time could not take place during an operation. By 13:05 the RAF fighters were back on the ground and ground crew commenced rearming and refuelling to make them battle ready as soon as possible. Meanwhile the pilots wrote their combat reports, which included filing claims and details of their battle to the best of their recollections. Bader's Duxford Wing landed. Owing to battle damage, only 49 of Duxford's 56 fighters were operational by the afternoon.

By this time, the German bombers were touching down at their bases in the Pas de Calais. Two were so badly damaged that they were written off in crash landings, bringing the total losses to eight Do 17s. Almost all bore the scars of battle. One machine had sustained 70 hits, another 200.

In the afternoon, Bomber Command abandoned more attacks on invasion ports because of insufficient cloud cover. Six Bristol Blenheims undertook an armed reconnaissance over the North Sea. Coastal Command flew 95 sorties for anti-invasion, anti-submarine, mine laying and reconnaissance missions. Spitfires photographed every port from Antwerp to Cherbourg. They returned with evidence of a gradually increasing buildup of amphibious forces. All the RAF aircraft returned.

== Mid-afternoon attack: 13:45 to 15:45 ==
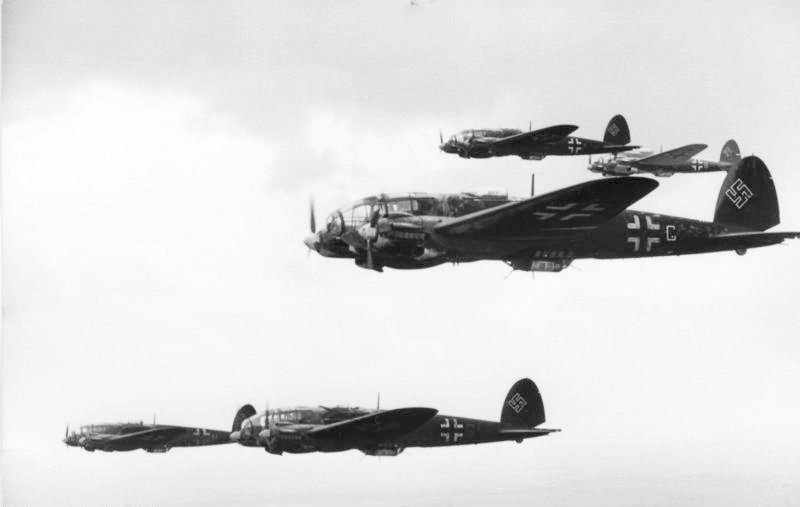
A formation of He 111Hs, circa 1940

Even before the Do 17s of KG 76 had touched down, the next wave was already getting airborne. II and III./Kampfgeschwader 2 (KG 2) (from Boissy-Saint-Léger and Cambrai), II./Kampfgeschwader 3 (KG 3) (from Antwerp), I and II./Kampfgeschwader 53 (KG 53) (from Lille) and I and II./Kampfgeschwader 26 (from Wevelghem and Gilze en Rijen) took off to target the West India Docks and Royal Victoria Dock north of the Thames as well as the warehouses of the Surrey Commercial Docks in the south. JG 53 and Adolf Galland's Jagdgeschwader 26 (JG 26) were to escort the bombers. The fighters met them as the bombers formed up over Calais.

The phalanx of German bombers headed for Dungeness. At the head were 43 Do 17s from KG 2; next, a couple of miles behind, came 24 He 111s of KG 53; a couple of miles further behind came 19 Do 17s from KG 3; and finally 28 He 111s of KG 26. The headwind was present again, and the 114 bombers battled against it. The German fighter pilots kept close escort. They detested the tactic. It handed the initiative to the British regarding how and when to attack. Moreover, if they were bounced by Spitfires, the Bf 109s would take too long to accelerate to full throttle in order to escape.

The German fighter escort consisted of five Gruppen from JG 3, JG 53 and Jagdgeschwader 77 (JG 77). LG 2 Bf 109s flew top cover while Adolf Galland's JG 26 and Jagdgeschwader 51 (JG 51) conducted fighter sweeps in advance of the main bomber stream. For the sake of the morale of the bomber crews, Zerstörergeschwader 26 (Destroyer Wing 26 or ZG 26) flying the Messerschmitt Bf 110 flew close escort to KG 26. The bomber force was half the size of the formation that hit London on 7 September, but instead of having two fighters for every bomber, there were four. Nor could the German pilots complain about being tied to the bombers. Sufficient numbers of fighters were allowed to roam on free-ranging patrols.

At 13:45, Chain Home radar picked up the German raids. No. 11 Group scrambled one Spitfire from RAF Hawkinge on the channel coast. Flown by No. 92 Squadron Pilot Officer Alan Wright, his job was to climb as quickly as possible over the sea and act as a spotter. He was to report on the direction, height, composition and strength of the German formation. The radar operators assessed the strengths of the three largest formations at 30, 50, and 60 plus. Five smaller formations added up to 85 plus. In fact, the British estimate of 225 aircraft proved too small. The German force was 475 aircraft strong. Shortly before 14:00, the German formation left the French coast. Park ordered his forces to repeat the earlier interception tactic. Four pairs of squadrons were ordered to patrol Sheerness, Chelmsford, Hornchurch, and RAF Kenley.

=== RAF scramble ===
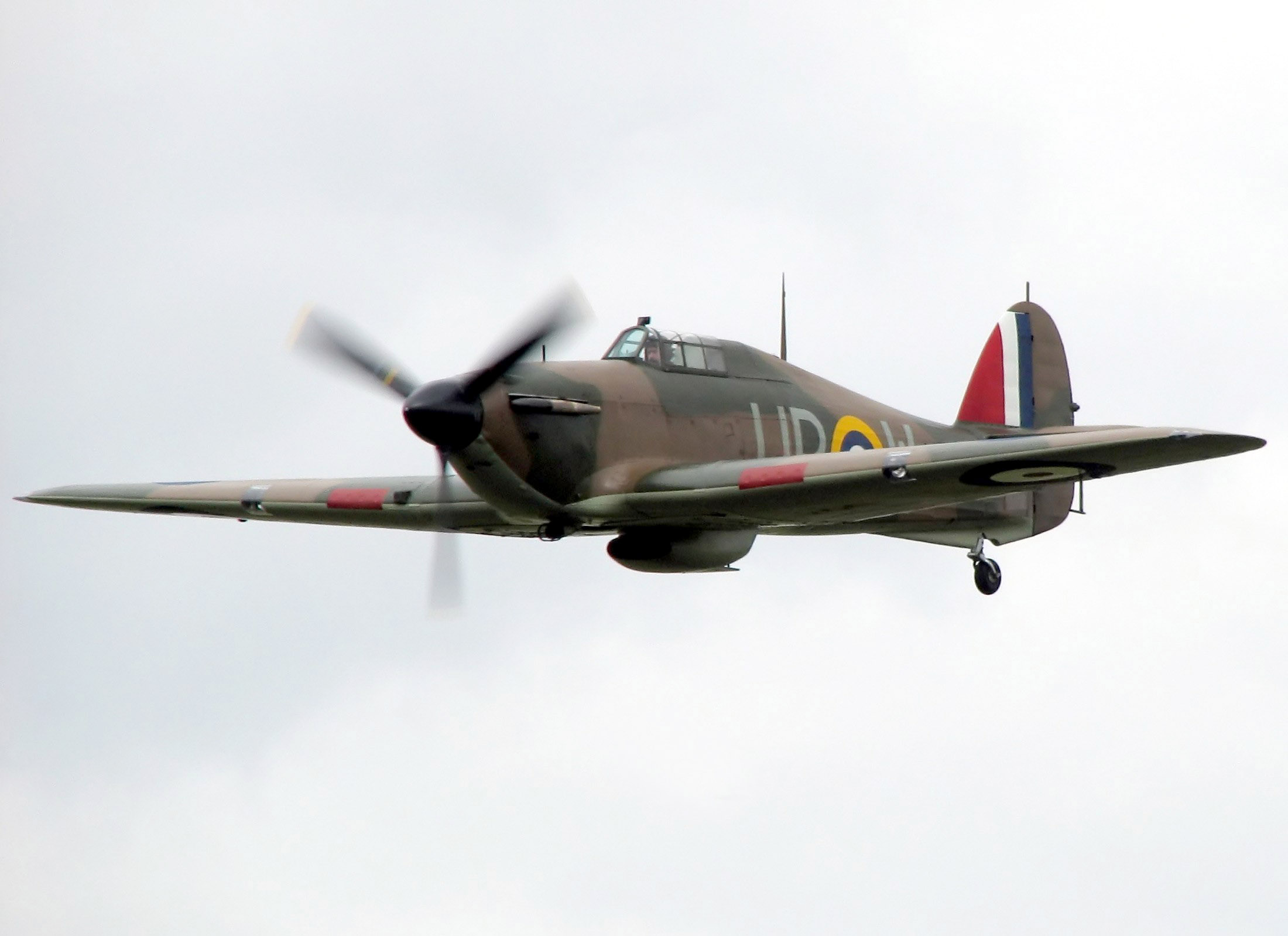
Hawker Hurricane Mk. I, from the Battle of Britain

At 14:00, No. 11 Group released 68 fighters. Hornchurch's Nos. 603 and 222 Squadrons committed 20 Spitfires to Sheerness at 20,000 ft (6,100 m). The squadrons failed to find each other and went into action singly. At Debden, Nos. 17 and 257 Squadrons sent 20 Hurricanes to Chelmsford at 15,000 ft (4,600 m). Kenley dispatched Nos. 501 and 605 Squadrons with 17 Hurricanes to Kenley at just 5,000 ft (1,500 m). North Weald ordered Nos. 249 and 504 Squadrons to cover Hornchurch at 15,000 ft (4,600 m).

Just five minutes later, the German bombers began splitting into three groups, heading for the coast between Dungeness and Dover. Park decided to scramble four more squadrons. When it became apparent that five concentrations of Bf 109s were taking the direct route to London on free-hunting patrols, Park scrambled eight more squadrons. No. 11 Group dispatched Biggin Hill's No. 41 Squadron, followed by No. 92 Squadron, together totalling 20 Spitfires. They were directed to Hornchurch at 20,000 ft (6,100 m). At 12:10, Northolt sent 21 Hurricanes of Nos. 1 (Canadian) and 229 Squadrons to Northolt while North Weald sent nine Hurricanes of No. 46 Squadron to the London Docks. Biggin Hill sent another wave, Nos. 72 and No. 66 Squadrons, with 20 Spitfires to Biggin Hill at 20,000 ft (6,100 m). Debden was called into action again and ordered No. 73 Squadron to Maidstone at 15,000 ft (4,600 m). Beginning at 12:15, Kenley dispatched No. 253 Squadron with nine Hurricanes to guard the airfield. RAF Tangmere was in action for the first time, sending 23 Hurricanes of Nos. 213 and 607 Squadrons to defend Kenley and Biggin Hill. The largest contingent came from No. 12 Group. Duxford, or the "Big Wing", Nos. 19, 242, 302, 310 and 311 Squadrons, with 20 Spitfires and 27 Hurricanes, were ordered to Hornchurch at 25,000 ft (7,600 m). Middle Wallop committed No. 238 Squadron and 12 Hurricanes to the Kenley area.

By the time Park decided to launch his third wave, the first engagements were taking place. At 14:20, he ordered No. 11 Group's No. 303 (Polish) Squadron and its nine Hurricanes to Northolt at 20,000 ft (6,100 m). Tangmere scrambled No. 602 Squadron and 12 Spitfires to loiter over Kenley, Biggin Hill and Gravesend. Meanwhile, No. 10 Group were ordered into action with a request for protection over Kenley. Thirteen Spitfires of No. 609 Squadron were dispatched from Middle Wallop at 14:28, and soon reached 15,000 ft (4,600 m) over Kenley.

The RAF now had 276 Spitfires and Hurricanes in the air while the Luftwaffe had 475. The Germans outnumbered the British in this raid by two to one. More importantly, for every two RAF fighters, there were three Bf 109s.

=== Initial clashes ===
Over Romney Marsh Nos. 41, 92 and 222 Squadrons engaged JG 26, losing one of their number to the Bf 109s. The second wave of RAF fighters arrived on the scene, comprising 607 and 213 Squadrons with 23 Hurricanes. They initiated a head-on attack against the Do 17s of KG 3. A Hurricane and a Dornier collided, both going down. The Bf 109s did their best to break up attacks and the bombers held a tight formation, putting up withering cross-fire. The Bf 109s were not permitted to leave the bombers and chase enemy fighters. Time and again, they were forced to break off and return to the bomber stream, allowing the RAF fighters to return and repeat the process. Soon after, No. 605 and No. 501 Squadron arrived with 14 Hurricanes. One fighter was hit by return fire, but the pilot aimed his aircraft at a Dornier and bailed out. The fighter collided and destroyed the bomber. The German bomber crews had no way of knowing that the crashes were not premeditated. It seemed as if the British were desperate. Nevertheless, they thought the 'tactic' was devastatingly effective. Chastened by losses, the Dorniers closed ranks to snuff out the gaps and continued to their target.

At 14:31, they reached the Thames and British anti-aircraft artillery opened up. The bombers were forced to evade their fire. One Dornier was damaged. KG 53 lost a He 111 following up KG 3 over the area.

"What other reserves have we?"

"There are none."

— Churchill's question to Park on 15 September 1940

At 14:35, Park and Churchill watched the battle unfold in Uxbridge's operations room. The Prime Minister saw that every squadron was being used and asked what reserves were available. Park said there were none. He was referring only to No. 11 Group, as there were more aircraft in nearby sectors. At Park's request, squadrons from the sectors of No. 10 and 12 Groups closest to London were committed to its defence. If the Luftwaffe launched a follow-up attack, there were only three squadrons sufficiently close enough to engage, and even they would take 30 minutes to get there. All the other day fighter squadrons of Nos. 10 and 12 Groups were based too far away to get involved. Nevertheless, Park knew that the low cloud present over most of his airfields provided some protection from high-altitude bombing raids attacks. Possibly to create a reserve, Park ordered Nos. 41, 213 and 605 Squadrons to return early though they had only been airborne for 45 minutes and had plenty of fuel left, even if ammunition was short. The vast bulk of the remaining squadrons were heading to London. A total of 185 fighters in nineteen squadrons were ready to engage. The battle would involve some 500 aircraft.

=== Main battle ===
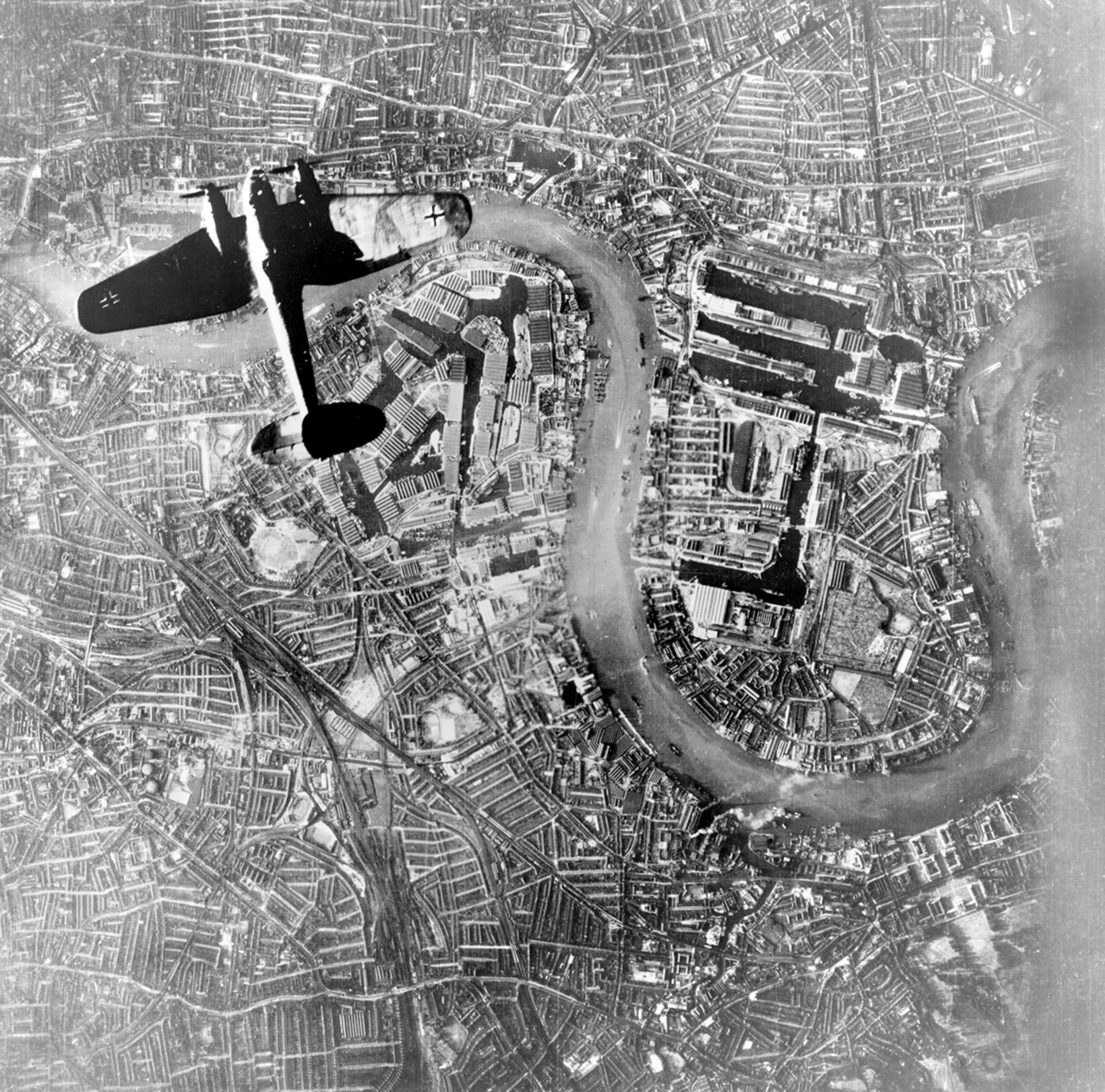
Heinkel He 111 bomber over the Surrey Commercial Docks in South London and Wapping and the Isle of Dogs in the East End of London on 7 September 1940

In the vicinity of Gravesend, the right-hand German formation – comprising the Do 17s of KG 3, trailed by the He 111s of KG 26 – would bear the brunt of the next attack from 63 fighters from Nos. 17, 46, 249, 257, 504 and 603 Squadrons. The Hurricanes of Nos. 249 and 504 squadrons went into action first. Their first pass saw three Do 17s go down, including Hauptmann Ernst Püttmann, leading 5. Staffel of KG 3 (5./KG 3). The Bf 109s escorting KG 26 could only watch, forbidden to leave their Heinkel charges. As the first attack finished, No. 257 Squadron, led by Squadron Leader Robert Stanford Tuck, attacked the Heinkels with nine Hurricanes. The escorts had their work cut out and were scattered. This left Tuck's Hurricanes to target the badly protected bombers.

Meanwhile KG 53 came under attack from Nos. 1 (Canadian), 66, 72, and 229 Squadrons. Some of the attacking Spitfires climbed over the bombers to seek cover from the Bf 109s. The British pilots were surprised to see an unidentified formation of Bf 109s continue on without interfering. Two He 111s were forced back to France and another was shot down. Nine Bf 109s were providing close escort for I./JG 3. They claimed one Canadian Hurricane and one Spitfire from No. 66 Squadron. KG 2, in the left-hand column, came under attack from 23 Hurricanes from Nos. 73, 253 and 303 Squadrons. JG 53 were alert to the danger and shot down a Hurricane of No. 303 Squadron and damaged five more. No. 73 Squadron made a head-on attack, damaging one bomber.

Meanwhile, Park was hoping for Bader's Wing to turn up and deliver its promised results. As soon as the Duxford Wing did arrive it was intercepted. Arriving between Kenley and Maidstone at varying altitude (15,000–16,000 ft (4,600–4,900 m)), it emerged from cloud in the vicinity of KG 2's stream. Galland's JG 26 was directly above it. In a reversal of their roles, the Hurricanes engaged the Bf 109s while the Spitfires went for the bombers. While they failed to deliver their anti-bomber attacks, they drew in the Bf 109 escorts and free-hunting German fighters, making it easier for other RAF fighters to reach the bombers. No. 310 Squadron lost two Hurricanes to JG 26, one to Galland, as the battle became a confusing mess of combats. By 14:40, the bombers reached London. KG 3 had lost three Do 17s destroyed and two damaged while KG 26 had suffered only one damaged bomber. KG 53 in the central column had lost one and three more were forced to turn back owing to battle damage, while only one KG 2 machine had been forced to do the same. Despite the British presence, 100 bombers carrying 120 tons of bombs prepared to drop their bombs.

One of the reasons the bombers had sustained so little damage was the cloud base. Its density had made it difficult for RAF fighter controllers to accurately direct their squadrons. However the cloud also obscured the target area and extended from 2,000 ft (610 m) to 12,000 ft (3,700 m). When the bombers reached the Victoria Docks, it and the other targets were covered but the skies were clear over West Ham. The bombers concentrated on the borough, in particular the Bromley-by-Bow gas works. KG 3, 26 and 53 dropped their bombs at 14:45.

Most of the targeted area was three square miles in extent, bounded on the north by the overground railway of the District line, on the west by the River Lea, on the east by the Plaistow marshes and on the south by the Royal Victoria Dock. The gas works were targeted by KG 26. Heavy high explosive bombs severely damaged the plant. Upton Park tube station was also hit and an electric sub-station was hit, causing a power-cut. Residential areas were badly damaged. KG 2 was unable to find the Surrey Commercial Docks. It turned away and dropped its bombs over a wide area. According to West Ham borough records, 17 people were killed, or died of wounds sustained in the attack. Another 92 were seriously injured, while 40 were slightly injured. As the Germans flew back over the English Channel, some bomber groups scattered while others formed uneven formations and were pursued by RAF fighters. With fuel dwindling, the Bf 109s headed back to France, unable to help the hard-pressed bombers.

The German bombers that had been forced out of formation attempted to make it to France using the cloud as cover. However, virtually all were destroyed. Four Do 17s and six He 111s were shot down by fighters that were now swarming over Kentish air space. The main formations withdrew as more RAF squadrons closed in. The escort plan held up, and 50 Bf 109s met the withdrawing units, though it appears that the German fighters sent to cover the retreat made little impact and were hardly noticed by RAF fighters: two RAF fighters were lost to the escorts. It appears I./Lehrgeschwader 1 (LG 1) formed part of the withdrawal force, losing three Bf 110s to No. 303 (Polish) Squadron RAF at 15:50. Nos. 238, 602 and 609 Squadrons exploited gaps in the formation. No. 238 Hurricanes engaged KG 53 while the others shot down two Do 17s from KG 2. Bader's squadron also took part, shooting down one Dornier. No. 303 Squadron claimed three Dorniers and two Bf 110s while No. 602 claimed seven bombers and two fighters. The RAF grossly over-claimed German losses, claiming 77 bombers and 29 fighters.

German losses on that raid had been heavy. KG 2 had lost eight Do 17s while seven were damaged. Personnel losses of the unit amounted to nineteen crew killed, nine captured and ten wounded. KG 3 had fared little better, with six aircraft destroyed and four damaged. In II./KG 3, fifteen personnel were killed, ten were captured and four were wounded. The He 111s were to suffer lightly. One He 111 was lost, its crew captured. Three more were damaged and two crewmen were wounded. KG 53 lost six Heinkels with another two damaged. It lost twelve aircrew killed, eighteen captured and four wounded, including Major Max Gruber, II./KG 53's Gruppenkommandeur (Group Commander). The German fighter screen suffered as well. In the battle, JG 51 lost two Bf 109s, JG 52 a single Bf 109, JG 53 lost seven Bf 109s and one damaged, JG 77 lost one and one damaged, while LG 2 lost two Bf 109s. Two more Bf 109s were lost owing to the pilots running out of fuel or being shot down in combat.

In total, the Luftwaffe had lost 21 or 23 bombers destroyed, and scores damaged. It also lost at least 12 fighters. The RAF had lost 15 fighters destroyed while 21 were damaged.

From 15:00, III./Kampfgeschwader 55 (KG 55) took off from Villacoublay led by Major Schlemell. It headed towards Southampton before diverting to bomb Royal Navy targets at Portland. British radar reported them as six intruders. There were actually more than 20 He 111s without fighter escort. They were intercepted by six Spitfires from No. 152 Squadron from RAF Warmwell. The bombers dropped their bombs, but only five fell among naval installations, causing minor damage. The RAF fighters claimed one destroyed and another damaged. KG 55 9 Staffel lost one He 111P-2 (one survivor) and 8 Staffel suffered one bomber damaged and one of the crew killed.

== Evening and night actions ==
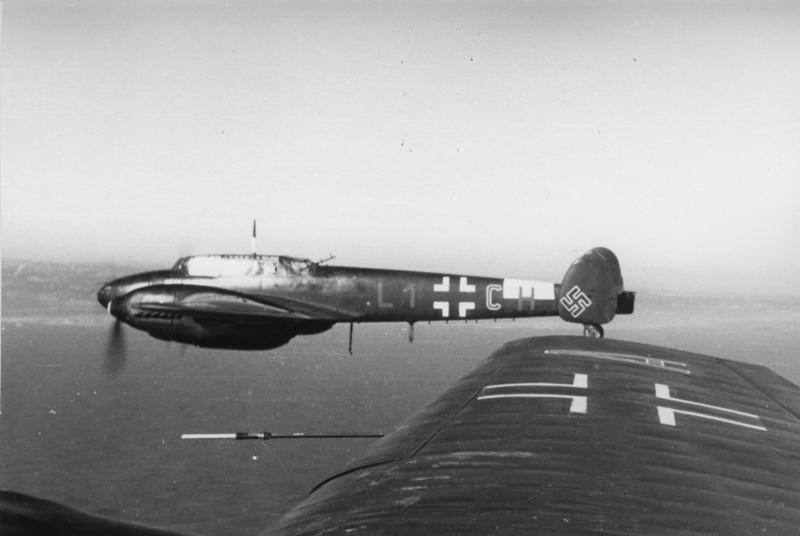
Messerschmitt Bf 110s of 1. Staffel/LG 1, which attacked Southampton in the afternoon

There was one more noteworthy operation before the Germans ceased their attacks for the day. At 17:40, 20 aircraft from Erprobungsgruppe 210 took off. It was picked up just off the Cherbourg peninsula as it made its way across the central Channel to the Isle of Wight. By 17:50, it had reached St. Catherine's Point. Nos. 213 and 602 Squadrons were patrolling nearby at Tangmere, where they were kept for the duration of the raid. No. 607 Squadron, also from Tangmere, was flying to the airfield over Southampton at 15,000 ft (4,600 m) and No. 609 Squadron was on its way from Middle Wallop to patrol Portsmouth. At 18:00, by which time the German operation was virtually over, the British dispositions were completed when No. 238 Squadron took off from Middle Wallop to patrol the airfield.

The German target was the Spitfire factory at Woolston. They arrived near it at 17:55. The Southampton guns engaged them for the entire time over the target. RAF fighters arrived as the Germans retired. Fortunately for the British, the Germans missed the factory. They did manage to rupture a number of gas and water mains while damaging nearby residential areas. Slight damage was done to the shipbuilding yard in Southampton Harbour. According to German records, 10–11 t (11–12 short tons) of bombs were dropped. Had they succeeded in hitting the Spitfire factory, they could have seriously reduced British fighter production. As it was, nine civilians were killed, 10 seriously injured, and 23 slightly injured in the attack.

The make up of the formation is unclear. An eye-witness, air enthusiast Alexander McKee, 22, was drinking tea at a café in Stoneham when the attack began:

I went outside on hearing enemy planes. I counted them aloud. Ten. They dived straight on Southampton, without any preliminaries, through a barrage of gunfire, one after the other. Alfred saw a bomb released, then handed the glasses [binoculars] to me. The aircraft had twin-rudders, and might have been Dorniers or Jaguars [a bomber version of the Bf 110 thought to be in use at the time]. The dives were fast but shallow, and they pulled out of them at about 2,000 feet. It was not a dive-bombing attack proper. Soldiers passing made inane remarks about 'nothing could live in that barrage', although the Germans were very obviously living in it, too. The barrage was quite good, but none of the Huns were brought down. ... Very quickly and efficiently the Germans re-formed and disappeared into the cloud. I have never seen a better bit of flying than those Nazi pilots put up – they got into formation like a well-drilled team, in the teeth of the guns.

Nos. 607 and 609 Squadrons engaged the Germans south-west of The Needles. The British reported 30–40 Bf 110s with 15 Do 17s in support. The tonnage of bombs dropped suggested there were fewer bombers than claimed. The RAF fighters claimed four Do 17s. The Germans had succeeded in penetrating the airspace without interception and came close to inflicting critical damage to the Spitfire factory. The radar had done its job and alerted No. 11 and 10 Group 20 minutes before the bombs started to fall, but the Group controllers were late in ordering their Squadrons to scramble.

More interceptions took place in the evening. The interception of two separate He 111s near London at 19:00 signalled the last engagement of daylight. It is likely they were on reconnaissance missions to assess the damage done in the attacks. The interception was made by No. 66 Squadron. One of the He 111s was chased out to sea and was last seen flying on one engine. It was likely to have belonged to I./Kampfgeschwader 1 (KG 1), which reported one He 111 destroyed upon crash landing back in France after combat.

Small groups of German bombers attempted to attack London in the afternoon, causing little damage. II./Kampfgeschwader 4 (KG 4) had one He 111 crash land near Eindhoven after combat with the crew unhurt. The bomber was 30 percent damaged. 6 Staffel Kampfgeschwader 30 (KG 30) lost one Junkers Ju 88 to fighters when it crashed in France and another force landed after combat. I. and II./Kampfgeschwader 51 (KG 51) lost one Ju 88 each and another damaged. In the lost Ju 88s, all crews were reported missing.

Kampfgeschwader 27 (KG 27) bombed Liverpool during the night at 22:48. Widespread damage was caused in the city and neighbouring Birkenhead, but only nine casualties were inflicted. Elsewhere damage was reported at Eastbourne, Worthing, Bournemouth, Cardiff, Avonmouth, Manchester, Warrington, Bootle and Preston. RAF night fighters flew 64 sorties and intercepted two bombers. Neither the fighters nor ground defences claimed any successes.

== Aftermath ==
The Luftwaffe's policy of attacking London after the successful 7 September raid had become counter-productive, and in this matter the Luftwaffe suffered from serious misjudgement resulting from their intelligence service. The crews were told the RAF was down to its last reserves and that one more assault would clinch victory. This was incorrect, which meant bomber crews would be in for a shock on 15 September. The RAF had been given much needed rest after its intense operations in August by the shift to bombing London. British radar, having been virtually untouched, was still able to follow the slow German build-ups over France long before the first German aircraft reached British airspace and give Fighter Command plenty of warning. Moreover, by choosing to attack London, it exposed the bombers to greater danger by forcing them to fly greater distances in hostile air space. German crews would be forced to fight all the way to London and back. As it happened, all the German bomber units were at least intercepted on 15 September, and were then scattered as they withdrew.

=== Overclaiming and propaganda ===
Overclaiming in aerial warfare is common and Second World War pilots often claimed more aircraft shot down than was actually the case. The Air Ministry released a press statement on 15 September that 175–185 German aircraft had been shot down. The actual number of aircraft destroyed was two-thirds lower and significantly less than the number of German losses on 15 and 18 August (The Hardest Day), in which the Luftwaffe lost 75 and 69 respectively.

At 20:00, Churchill, who had returned to 10 Downing Street, was awakened. He received bad news from the navy. In the Atlantic sinking of shipping had been bad, but his Secretary informed him that all had been redeemed in the day's air battle. He was told the RAF had downed 183 enemy aircraft for under 40 losses.

On 16 September, a British flying boat arrived in New York City delivering news of a "record bag" of 185 enemy aircraft. The German Embassy tried in vain to correct the total. The Germans were ignored and The New York Times ran several excited stories calling for a military alliance with Britain and her Commonwealth. The Germans were slower in putting their story together. On 17 September, the Nazi Party newspaper Völkischer Beobachter announced that attacks had caused considerable damage to London. It claimed the Luftwaffe destroyed 79 RAF aircraft for 43 losses. This was also a severe over claim. RAF losses amounted to 29 fighters.

AOC 11 Group Keith Park was livid with the claim returns. As far as he was concerned, claiming 200 on one day was nonsense. He placed particular blame on Leigh-Mallory's Big Wing which had claimed one third, around 60, of the 185 'victories' (total claims were 81 in the morning and 104 in the afternoon). More damage should have been done to German bombers inbound to the target rather than destroying stragglers that were no military threat as they made their way to the coast. He complained that there were too many inexperienced leaders and interceptions were being missed. Park's lesson for 15 September was that things needed "tightening up". Park was aware the ratio of losses was 2:1 in the British favour. It had been a decent performance, but not Fighter Command's best.

=== Evaluation of the day's events ===
In the two main engagements, the fighter losses had been about equal. The big difference was the bomber losses. Fighter Command had greater success against the afternoon attack than the morning assault, which it outnumbered 2:1. The ratio of German fighters to bombers had been 3:1 in the morning but 5:1 in the afternoon, so there were more targets. The more bombers Kesselring sent, the more were lost.

Kesselring was back where he started. Park's handling of the actions was a masterpiece of aggressive defence, yet he was not under the same pressure as he had been during August when air battles were so confusing they were hard to control. A big set-piece offensive played into his hands.

Leigh-Mallory claimed the Big Wings had destroyed entire formations of enemy aircraft upon seeing them. He even claimed the RAF outnumbered their opponents in several engagements. In the afternoon battle, he claimed that the Wing could not get into position to break up the bombers in time and was intercepted by German fighters. While that was true, he also claimed his units had shot down 105 enemy aircraft and probably destroyed a further 40. He claimed another 18 damaged for the loss of 14 and six pilots. These claims were a massive exaggeration but while the Big Wing had proven tactically ineffective for the most part, its biggest contribution to the day was its effect on German morale. German aircrews had been told the RAF was a defeated force and the German bomber units that had seen the Big Wing form up were quite shocked, and those crews in the badly hit units, including KG 2 and KG 3, that had witnessed head-on collisions with German aircraft were badly shaken.

A German victory on the Battle of Britain Day was unlikely. It could only have been possible if Park had made crass errors and had been caught on the ground. Stephen Bungay postulates that had the loss rates been reversed, Dowding could have replaced those with reinforcements from his C units and carried on. Moreover, during both major engagements Fighter Command had used less than half of its strength. It would have been able to meet the Luftwaffe again on the morrow.

Göring met his staff at Carinhall, his country estate, the following day to assess the action but their conclusions verged on pure fantasy. They believed the RAF had withdrawn all available fighter units from all over the country to concentrate on London. The fact that the Western afternoon raids against ports were uncontested led them to believe the enemy was breaking. Another four or five days, they thought, would be sure to break them. Theo Osterkamp, a staff officer at Luftflotte 2, pointed to the massed formation of fighters seen by the bomber crews and argued this led to the ineffectiveness of the 15 September raids. Göring was delighted with the news that the RAF were committing large numbers of fighters to battle. This would allow the German fighters to engage and destroy them in large numbers. However, the Germans had not realised this stratagem was by no means uniform in Fighter Command. Thus the OKL remained confident of victory. It blamed the bad weather and the RAF's last-minute change of strategy for prolonging summer operations.

The OKL believed that the British were down to their last 300 fighters, with only 250 being produced. To stop fighter production, factories in Bristol were to be attacked. London was also to be subjected to round the clock bombing. However, instead of the large bomber formations used on 15 September, smaller numbers were to be used and these were to be accompanied with an increased fighter escort.

=== Impact ===
On 17 September, and unconvinced that the Luftwaffe could secure the required air superiority for Sea Lion to proceed by the then set S-Day of 21 September, Hitler sent a directive to the Oberkommando der Wehrmacht (OKW) advising of the invasion's postponement until further notice. It is also likely that Hitler did not want to gamble his new-found military prestige by launching a hazardous venture across the Channel unless the Luftwaffe had crushed all opposition. Within days, RAF reconnaissance aircraft began reporting reduced numbers of barges present in the German-controlled ports along the Belgian and French coastlines. At the beginning of December, Hitler told the OKW to abandon Sea Lion, although he did not officially cancel it until 3 March 1942.

To maintain pressure on the United Kingdom, the Luftwaffe changed tactics and commenced the Blitz, a strategic bombardment of London and the major British industrial cities by night for the next several months. The lack of RAF night defences in this stage of the war enabled the German bombers to inflict extensive damage without suffering the heavy losses of the daylight campaign. It is estimated that the Luftwaffe lost around 500 aircrews during the Blitz, whereas in the Battle of Britain it lost around 2,800 killed, 340 wounded, 750 captured. Overall losses were cut by one-third of daylight operations.

The Luftwaffe's failure to secure the destruction of the RAF on 15 September was a decisive failure, with significant implications for Germany's war effort. As Hitler committed the country to ever increasing military adventures, the Wehrmacht became increasingly overstretched and was unable to cope with a multi-front war. By 1944, the Allies were ready to launch Operation Overlord, the invasion of Western Europe. The Battle of Britain ensured that the Western Allies had a base from which to launch the campaign and that there would be a Western Allied presence on the battlefield to meet the Soviet Red Army in central Europe at the end of the war in May 1945.

== Commemoration ==
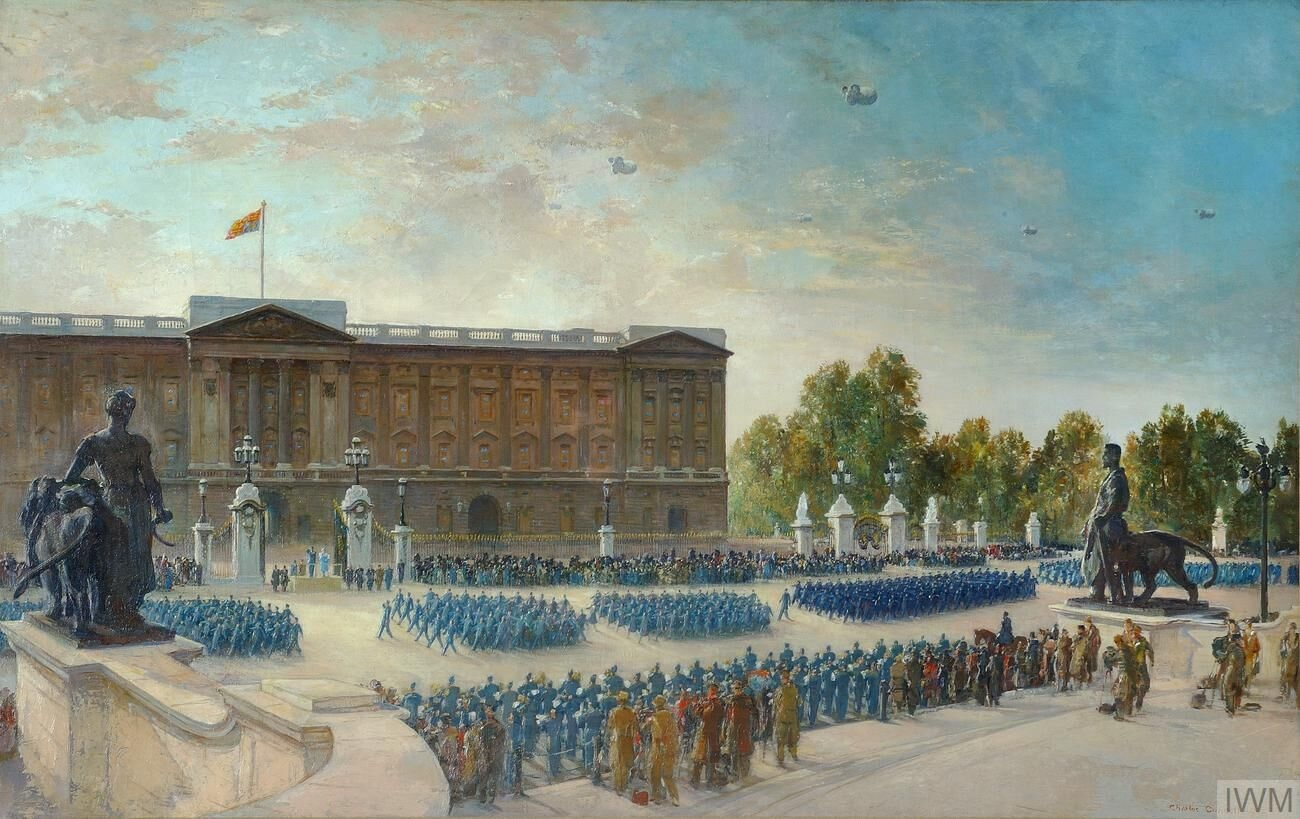
The Battle of Britain anniversary parade at Buckingham Palace in 1943

Due to its significance to the Battle of Britain, 15 September is commemorated annually as Battle of Britain Day in the United Kingdom. In Canada, the commemoration takes place on the third Sunday of September.

== See also ==
- May Day in England
- Minden Day
- Oak Apple Day
- St Crispin's day
- St George's Day in England
- Feast day of St Thomas Becket
- Trafalgar Day
