= German air raid on Rennes =

Air attack on Rennes marshalling yard

German air raid on Rennes (1940)
- Part of the Battle of France and World War II
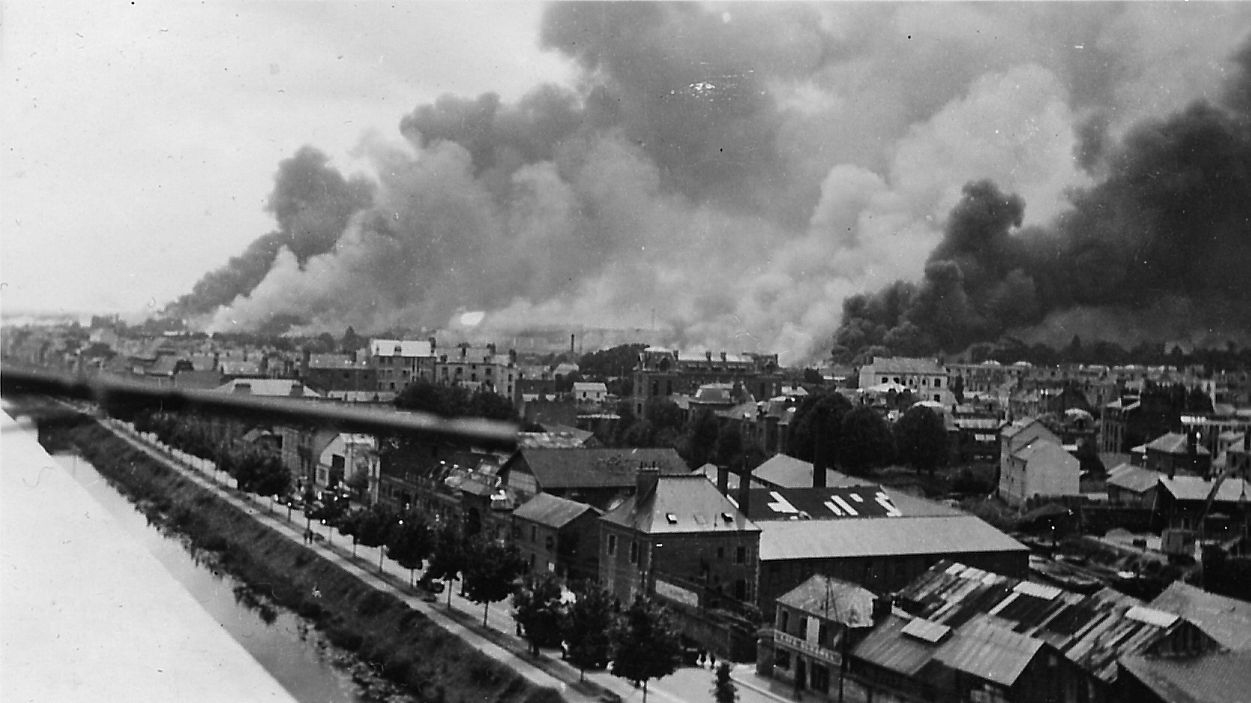
- View of Rennes marshalling yards after the attack
Date	17 June 1940
Location	Rennes, France 48°06′26″N 01°38′15″W
Result	German victory

Belligerents
Germany	France; United Kingdom

Commanders and leaders
Alois Lindmayr	Camille Bazoche; Antoine Béthouart; J. B. H. Doyle

Units involved
7KG/76	212th artillery regiment 203rd artillery regiment 222nd artillery regiment 64th artillery regiment Royal Engineers

Casualties and losses
1 bomber damaged	Official account: 805 killed; 591 French soldiers; 175 British soldiers; 39 civilians; Other sources: 1,500 to 2,000 killed

On 17 June 1940, during the later stages of the Battle of France, the Luftwaffe launched an air raid on Rennes. The attack was against the Rennes marshalling yards, congested at the time by troop-trains and others carrying refugees from northern France. The explosion of two trains loaded with ammunition and high explosives unleashed havoc throughout the railway station and the city, killing between 800 and 2,000 people among civilians and Allied military personnel.

== Background ==
The stunning advance of the German Army through central France in June 1940 prompted the French government of Paul Reynaud to plan a last-ditch resistance in Brittany in the hope of establishing a national redoubt, the so-called "Réduit Breton", to stop the German onslaught and eventually mount a counter-offensive. The seat of government would be at Quimper. Charles De Gaulle, sub-Secretary of State for the National Defense, paid a visit to Brittany on 12 June to assess the feasibility of the project but concluded that the influx of refugees on roads and railways would have made logistics untenable. He was still favorable to the Quimper option, given the accessibility of this city to the sea, but at the end the choice of Reynaud was Bordeaux. Paris fell on 14 June, Reynaud resigned two days later and a government led by Philippe Pétain was appointed by President Albert Lebrun.

The remnants of the British Expeditionary Force (BEF) were retreating toward the ports of Brest, Cherbourg, Saint Nazaire and La Pallice. By mid-June 1940, the train station of Rennes, an important railway hub, was crowded with wagons carrying refugees, French troops returning from Dunkirk via Britain and British troops attempting to reach the Atlantic ports. On the marshalling yards there were a refugee train from Paris and Lisieux, a train with two French heavy artillery regiments (201 and 203) composed of recruits from Paris and Alsace, a train with another heavy artillery regiment (222) and another with British troops, most of them Royal Engineers, who had established a base at Rennes in late 1939. At the time of the bombing, the Royal Engineers in France were part of the Beauman Division and were led by Lieutenant-Colonel J. B. H. Doyle. Other sources include elements of the 64th Heavy Artillery Regiment, made of recruits from southern France. The massive flow of refugees and troops produced a bottleneck at the marshalling yards, leading to significant delays. Some of the French artillery units had been active in Flanders and had been evacuated from Dunkirk. At least one of the regiments had fought in the Battles of Narvik, under the command of General Antoine Béthouart. According to a witness, the British troops were on a large stationary convoy on the Saint Malo–Rennes railroad, overcrowded and thirsty in the heat of summer. On 16 June a German reconnaissance plane overflew the train station and was fired on by the anti-aircraft guns that were withdrawn from Rennes later that day.

== Air strike ==
7./Kampfgeschwader 76 (7./KG 76, 7th Staffel, bomber wing 76), led by Flight Lieutenant Alois Lindmayr had been supporting the German offensives on Aumale and Amiens. The unit was at an airfield at Cormeilles-en-Vexin, 300 km (190 mi) east of Rennes. By then, the German Army had reached Fougères, 50 km (31 mi) east of the city.

On 17 June 1940, five Do-17 bombers from 7/.KG 76 were awaiting orders at the airstrip in poor weather. As soon as the skies cleared, and with the threat of Allied fighters looming, the squadron took off rapidly. The Do-17s approached Rennes from the west, reached the eastern environs of the city and then turned back westward to perform a low-level bombing run. Some French civilians greeted the planes in the belief that they belonged to the Armee de L'air.

At 10:00 a.m., the aircraft dropped dozens of 55 kg (121 lb) bombs along the railroad in three places, simultaneously strafing anything that moved. Two wagons, one carrying 12 t (12 long tons; 13 short tons) of artillery ammunition and another carrying high explosives (melinita and cheddite) were hit. The majority of the bombs fell on the plain of Baud, an industrial area that included the marshalling yards, and Saint Hélier, where the high explosives train was parked. The high explosive and the ammunition train blew out in a huge conflagration. The blast of the ammunition train left a crater 80 m (260 ft) long, 20 m (66 ft) wide and 5 m (16 ft) deep. Wagons, live artillery rounds and debris fell as far as 300 m (980 ft) away. The explosions continued for the next 24 hours and the fires burned for several days. More than 22 km (14 mi) of railway were destroyed, as well as 1,000 railway cars. The German report put the number of wagons destroyed at 500. They also acknowledged that one of the bombers sustained damage from flying debris. Doors and windows were shattered within an extensive radius, as well as some stained glass of the Church of Saint-Germain and the roof of the friary of La Solitude.

Most of the town's population left Rennes for nearby villages by evening, despite the orders of the military commander in Rennes, General Camille Bazoche, firefighters, railway workers and volunteers risked their lives to rescue people. The death toll was substantial; 591 French soldiers, 175 British military personnel, 31 civilians and 8 people whose bodies were incinerated by the blasts, a total of 805 dead. Other accounts record from 1,500 to 2,000 fatalities.

The Germans conducted a reconnaissance flight a couple of hours after the raid. They reported a plume of smoke 200–300 m (660–980 ft) high and intermittent explosions that could be seen from 30 km (19 mi) away. Although the German report claims the bombing mission was intended to destroy the railway station, it appears to have been an opportunistic attack. In fact, Lindmayr, the squadron leader, admitted that the bombing was a "stroke of luck".

== Aftermath ==
Two hours after the raid on the train station, Petain publicly requested an armistice to Germany and on 18 June, German troops entered Rennes without meeting resistance. The recovery of bodies at the station continued for a week, notwithstanding the German occupation. The victims were buried in mass graves at the fields of Saint Helier, plain of Baud, at Bray and Cesson Sévigne. Doctor René Patay, a renowned physician, philanthropist, future mayor of the city, and vice-president of the French veterans, obtained permission from the German authorities for the exhumation and transfer of the bodies to the Eastern Cemetery at Rennes three months later.

The station remained out of commission until the end of June. More than 500 workers were involved in the cleaning operation and repairs; the reconstruction works lasted until 31 July 1940. Had it not been for the shock of the defeat, the bombing of Rennes marshalling yards would have been one of the most painful injuries of the war in France.

From 1943 until its liberation on 4 August 1944, the city suffered several Allied air raids. The railroad hub was once again the target of an airstrike, in this occasion carried out by the USAAF 303rd Bombardment Group (Heavy), on 8 March 1943. The local press claimed that more than 100 civilians were killed.

== See also ==
- RMS Lancastria
- Operation Paula
- German bombing of Rotterdam
- Operation Aerial
- Armistice of 22 June 1940
