= Paul Schultz =

WW2 German Army general (1891-1964)

- Born: 30 October 1891
- Died: 15 September 1964 (aged 72)
- Military career
- Allegiance: German Empire; Weimar Republic; Nazi Germany
- Branch: Army
- Service years: 1912–1920; 1935–1945
- Rank: Generalmajor
- Conflicts: World War II
- Awards: Knight's Cross of the Iron Cross with Oak Leaves
- Other work: Police officer

Paul Schultz (30 October 1891 – 15 September 1964) was a general in the Wehrmacht of Nazi Germany during World War II. He was a recipient of the Knight's Cross of the Iron Cross with Oak Leaves.

In April 1940 Schultz took part in Operation Weserubung and the invasion of Denmark at the head of the newly established 308 Infantry Regiment. Later that year, he took part in the invasion of France. On 1 September 1940 he was promoted colonel. Starting in June 1941 Paul Schultz led his regiment in the attack on southern Russia, where he was awarded on 18 October 1941 the German Cross in Gold.

In the fight for Krasnodar in the summer of 1942, Paul Schultz distinguished himself and on 3 September 1942 was presented with the Knight's Cross of the Iron Cross. On 1 August 1, 1943 he was appointed commander of the Army Aviation School of the 6th Army. On 26 August 1943 he was awarded retroactively the Oak Leaves to his Knight's Cross of the Iron Cross for contribution to the fight for the Kuban Bridgeheads.

On 1 March 1944 Paul Schultz was promoted to Generalmajor and on 10 October 1944 assumed command of the Waffenschule (weapons school) of the 8th Army. Schultz surrendered to the American forces in May 1945 with the 8th Army.

== Awards and decorations ==
- Iron Cross (1914) 2nd Class (9 September 1914) & 1st Class (6 July 1918)
- Clasp to the Iron Cross (1939) 2nd Class (17 April 1940) & 1st Class (1 August 1940)
- German Cross in Gold on 18 October 1941 as Oberst in Infanterie-Regiment 308
- Knight's Cross of the Iron Cross with Oak Leaves
  - Knight's Cross on 3 September 1942 as Oberst and commander of Grenadier-Regiment 308
  - Oak Leaves on 26 August 1943 as Oberst and commander of Grenadier-Regiment 308
