= Ludwig Schulz =

- Born: 4 August 1896
- Died: 10 December 1966 (aged 70)
- Military career
- Allegiance: Nazi Germany
- Branch: Luftwaffe
- Rank: Generalmajor
- Commands: I./Kampfgeschwader 76
- Conflicts: World War II
- Awards: Knight's Cross of the Iron Cross with Oak Leaves

Ludwig Schulz (4 August 1896 – 10 December 1966) was a German general during World War II, and a recipient of the Knight's Cross of the Iron Cross with Oak Leaves.

== Awards ==
- Clasp to the Iron Cross (1939) 2nd Class (14 May 1940) 1st Class (23 May 1940)
- Knight's Cross of the Iron Cross with Oak Leaves
  - Knight's Cross on 16 August 1940 as Major and commander of I./Kampfgeschwader 76
  - 747th Oak Leaves on 19 February 1945 as Generalmajor and of a Kampfgruppe in the Luftkriegsschule 5

Military offices
Preceded by Oberst Stefan Fröhlich	Gruppenkommandeur of I.Kampfgeschwader 76; November 1939 – 2 June 1940	Succeeded by Hauptmann Alois Lindmayr
