= Wels Airport =

Wels Airfield Flugplatz Wels
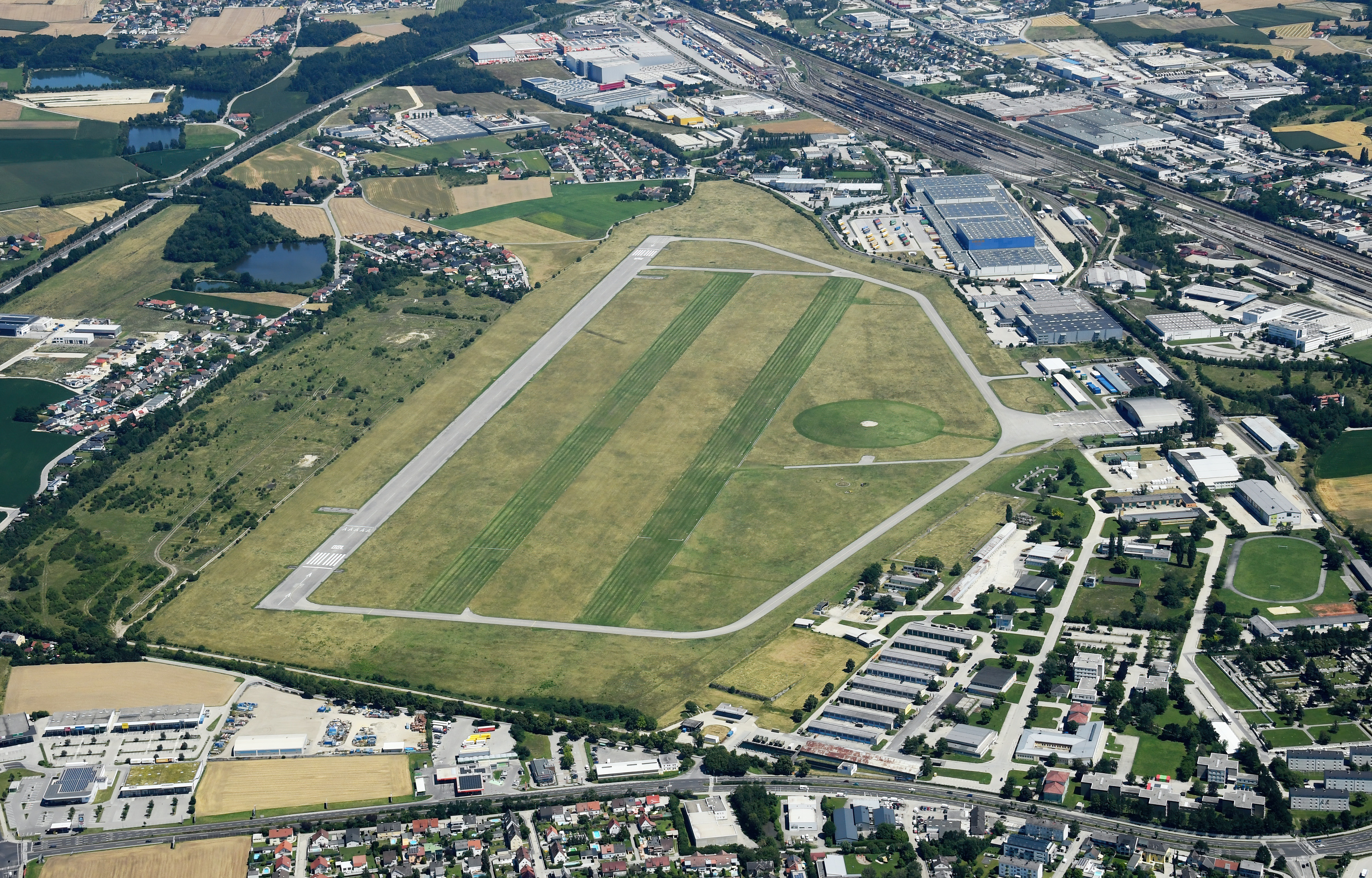
- IATA: none; ICAO: LOLW

Summary
- Airport type: Public
- Operator: Weisse Möwe Wels
- Serves: Wels, Austria
- Elevation AMSL: 1,043 ft / 318 m
- Coordinates: 48°10′59″N 014°02′27″E
- Website: http://www.wmw.at

Map
- Location of Wels Airfield in Austria

Runways
Direction	Length		Surface
Direction	m	ft	Surface
08L/26R	1,390	4,560	Asphalt
08C/26C	930	3,051	Grass/Dirt
08R/26L	900	2,952	Grass/Dirt (for gliders)
- Source: DAFIF

Wels Airfield (ICAO: LOLW) is an airfield serving Wels, a city in the Austrian state of Upper Austria. It is not used for commercial scheduled services but features business and general aviation as well as private and military training flights and medical transportation.

== See also ==
- Transport in Austria
- List of airports in Austria
