= Hans Jeschonnek =

German air force officer (1899–1943)

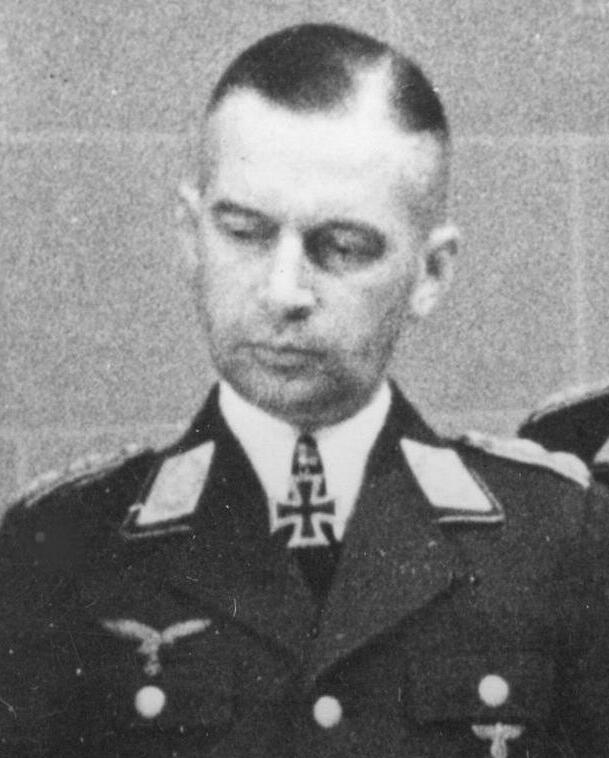
- Jeschonnek in 1941
- Born: 9 April 1899; Hohensalza, Bromberg district, Province of Posen, Kingdom of Prussia, German Empire
- Died: 18 August 1943 (aged 44); Camp Robinson near Goldap, Romincka Forest, German Reich
- Relatives: Gert Jeschonnek (brother)
- Military career
- Allegiance: German Empire; Weimar Republic; Nazi Germany
- Branch: Prussian Army; Imperial German Army; Freikorps; Reichsheer; Luftwaffe
- Service years: 1914–1943
- Rank: Generaloberst
- Conflicts: World War I; Silesian Uprisings; World War II; Polish Campaign; Battle of the Netherlands; Battle of Belgium; Battle of France; Battle of Britain; Balkans Campaign; Eastern Front; Defence of the Reich (KIA)
- Awards: Knight's Cross of the Iron Cross

Hans Wenzel Ernst Jeschonnek (9 April 1899 – 18 August 1943) was a German military aviator in the Luftstreitkräfte during World War I, a general staff officer in the Reichswehr in the inter–war period and Generaloberst (Colonel-General) and a Chief of the General Staff in the Luftwaffe, the aerial warfare branch of the Wehrmacht during World War II.

He was born in 1899 and joined the military as a cadet in 1909. Trained as an officer at a military academy, he was granted his commission in 1914 and served in the infantry on the Western Front. In 1916 he transferred to the Luftstreitkräfte and trained as a fighter pilot. Jeschonnek shot down two enemy aircraft by the time of the German defeat in November 1918, earning the Iron Cross 2nd and 1st class.

Jeschonnek remained in the military, joining the Freikorps and then the Reichswehr, the Weimar Republic armed forces. He fought in the Silesian Uprisings in 1919 and then served as a junior general staff officer in the 1920s. In 1933 the National Socialists seized power in Germany under the leadership of Adolf Hitler. Jeschonnek admired Hitler and under the leadership of his close associate Hermann Göring, commander-in-chief of the newly formed Luftwaffe, Jeschonnek's career began a meteoric rise from Hauptmann (Captain) in 1932 to Generalmajor (Brigadier General) in 1939. In November 1938 Jeschonnek was appointed chief of the general staff at just 39. Jeschonnek's rise depended, in part, on his slavish and unquestioning loyalty to Hitler and Göring.

Jeschonnek oriented the Luftwaffe away from the broadly based doctrines of the inter-war period upon the outbreak of World War II. He was a pupil of the short-term concept, the so-called Blitzkrieg war. As a result, Jeschonnek neglected principles surrounding industrial production, military intelligence, logistics, air defence, strategic bombing and the creation of reserves that were crucial to sustaining a military force. Rather, Jeschonnek's way of war was based on the full commitment of the Luftwaffe to close air support operations in cooperation with the German Army. Up until 1942, the German military's victories largely masked such errors in judgment by Jeschonnek, Göring and the Oberkommando der Luftwaffe (High Command of the Air Force). As the German war effort failed on the Eastern and North African Fronts in 1942 and 1943, the British and American Combined Bomber Offensive began a strategy to destroy the Luftwaffe in a war of attrition for which Jeschonnek and Göring had failed to prepare.

In 1943, Jeschonnek experienced at least one emotional breakdown over the failures and the inability of the Luftwaffe to defend Germany. Undermined by Göring and his subordinates, Jeschonnek shot himself on 18 August 1943. The suicide was covered up by Göring to preserve German morale and prevent the enemy powers from gaining any intelligence advantages.

== Early life, career and World War I ==
Jeschonnek was born on 9 April 1899 in the Prussian town of Inowroclaw (Hohensalza), the son of a teacher, Dr. phil. Friedrich Karl Jeschonnek (Note: In German a Doctor of Philosophy is abbreviated as Dr. phil. (doctor philosophiae).) and his wife Klara Emma Karoline. He had three brothers and a sister from his father's first marriage and four half-brothers from his father's second marriage. Three of his brothers opted for service in the Reichswehr; his brother Paul died in service at Rechlin on 29 June 1929. Gert Jeschonnek served 34 years as a naval officer. From 1905 until April 1908, Jeschonnek attended the Bürgerschule (citizen school) in Bromberg, present-day Bydgoszcz, and then for one year the local Gymnasium. In 1909, he joined the military Cadet Corps in Köslin, present-day Koszalin. In April 1913, he transferred to the Prussian Main Military academy (Preußische Hauptkadettenanstalt) in Lichterfelde.

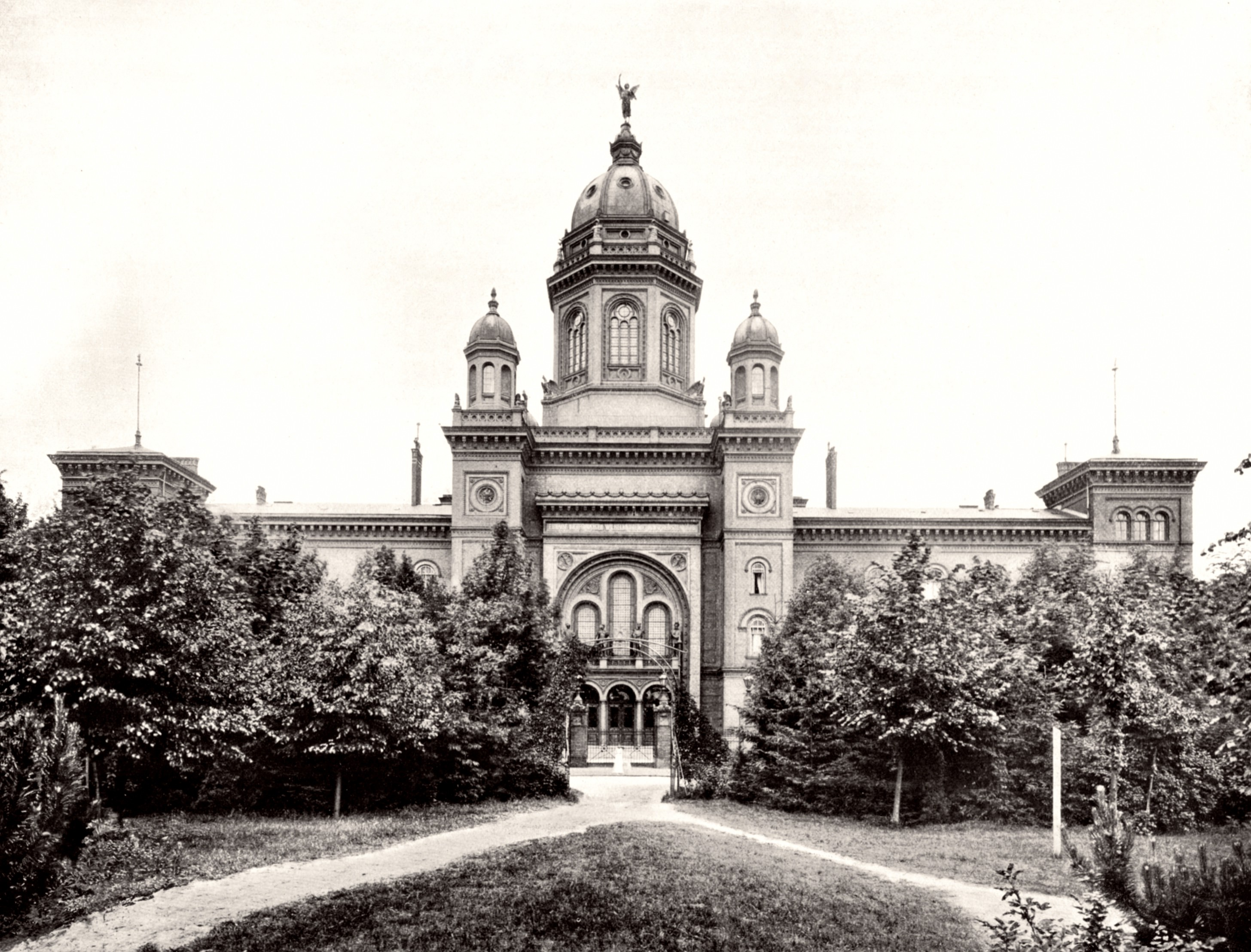
Preußische Hauptkadettenanstalt

He was made a Leutnant ohne Patent (second lieutenant without commission) in 1914 at the age of 15. In the first months of World War I he served in an infantry regiment: the 50th Lower Silesian Infantry Regiment. In 1915 Jeschonnek received his Leutnant commission at 16. Jeschonnek transferred to the Luftstreitkräfte (Imperial Air Service) at 17. He joined Jagdstaffel 40 (Fighter Squadron 40) on the Western Front and by time World War I ended, Jeschonnek had shot down two enemy aircraft and received the Iron Cross 1st Class and the Iron Cross 2nd Class.

Upon the German defeat, collapse of the German Empire and armistice in November 1918, Jeschonnek joined the Reichswehr and served the Weimar Republic. He fought in the Silesian Uprisings as a member of the Reichswehr's 6th Cavalry Regiment. Jeschonnek joined the Freikorps aerial detachments, Grenzschutz Fliegerabteilungen (GFA) and flew in the same conflict. He then worked under Kurt Student, Inspectorate of Arms Equipment in the Army Ordnance Department from 1923 to 1928 and studied at the General Staff. The lack of German equipment at this time allowed Jeschonnek to visit a number of other countries and fly a number of Dutch, Swedish and Swiss aircraft. In 1928 he graduated from the Kriegsakademie (War Academy) first in his class and in April Jeschonnek worked for Inspectorate 1 (L), the aerial warfare branch of the Ministry of the Reichswehr (Reichswehrministerium) under the command of Hellmuth Felmy from 1929. The department was covertly responsible for the building of military aircraft prohibited by the Treaty of Versailles.

Jeschonnek was one of 300 aviators, including 168 officers, who formed part of the embryonic air staff on 1 November 1930. He held office as a section leader in the Truppenamt and Waffenamt until 1935. Jeschonnek involved himself in the debate amongst officers in the Truppenamt in 1932 over the independence of military aviation. The head of the department from 1930 to 1934, Kurt von Hammerstein-Equord, objected to the air staff's proposals to make a future air arm semi-independent. He proposed dividing it into three branches, with the army taking control of the majority. Equord's opposition was answered in a paper by Jeschonnek, which advocated the centralisation of all aviation, military and civilian, under one office. The debates on air force organisations were resolved quickly once the Nazis came to power.

== Luftwaffe ==
On 30 January 1933 Adolf Hitler and the Nazi Party came to power. The National Socialists reorganised the Reichswehr and renamed it the Wehrmacht in 1935. The armed forces were divided into branches. On 1 May 1933 the Ministry of Aviation (Reichsluftfahrtministerium) was established. Jeschonnek — at only 34 — was appointed adjutant to Secretary of state Erhard Milch. The two men eventually became hostile to one another when Milch requested Jeschonneks' court-martial for a series of accidents in which air crews were ordered to fly low in inclement weather.

Concurrently, Jeschonnek held a field command as officer commanding Kampfgeschwader 152 (Bomber Wing 152). In March 1934 he was promoted to Hauptmann (Captain) while in command of KG 152. On 1 April 1935 he was elevated to the rank of Major. On 1 October 1936 Jeschonnek was appointed Head of Training Group III of Air Administrative Area I in Greifswald. Jeschonnek's time here was considered the happiest of his career. He was able to take an active part in testing and evaluating aircraft that brought the Luftwaffe to the cutting-edge of aircraft technology. Jeschonnek served as a section leader, with three serving officers, eleven former officers and 15 engineers with officer rank. He became a strong proponent of the Schnellbomber (fast bomber) concept while stationed there. The vision played an important part in German aircraft procurement.

=== General Staff ===
On 20 April 1937 Jeschonnek was promoted to Oberstleutnant (lieutenant colonel) and entered the Ministry of Aviation (Reichsluftfahrtministerium) as Chief of Branch 1 of the General Staff. Jeschonnek was a protégé of Walther Wever chief of staff in the Oberkommando der Luftwaffe (High Command of the Air Force). Wever designated him as his successor and Chief of the Luftwaffe Operations Staff in case of mobilisation in 1936. Wever recognised his intelligence and talent; Jeschonnek was considered the "wunderkind" of the General Staff. Wever, having had no plans in place for an early death, died in an air crash in June 1936. Jeschonnek had nearly completed his tutelage under Wever, a gifted staff officer, in the area of leadership, training and organisation. In the reorganisation following Wever's death, Jeschonnek became the chief of the Luftwaffe Operations Staff on 1 February 1938 and was promoted to Oberst (colonel) in November. At 39, the seniority of this rank was unusual in a peacetime professional military. Hitler's insistence on a rapid build-up created unique opportunities for early promotion.

Jeschonnek played a peripheral part in the political intrigues in the Luftwaffe. In 1937, then-chief of staff, Albert Kesselring, left office after battling with Milch. The latter began a campaign after Wever's death to place most of the functions and commands under his jurisdiction to become de facto chief of staff. On 1 June 1937 chief personnel officer Hans-Jürgen Stumpff replaced Kesselring. Stumpff fought against Milch's power-grabbing and on 6 December 1937 he sent a memorandum to Göring, complaining the General Staff and Milch's offices were issuing directives without consultation. He called the lack of a demarcation line in the chain of command "damaging and unacceptable."

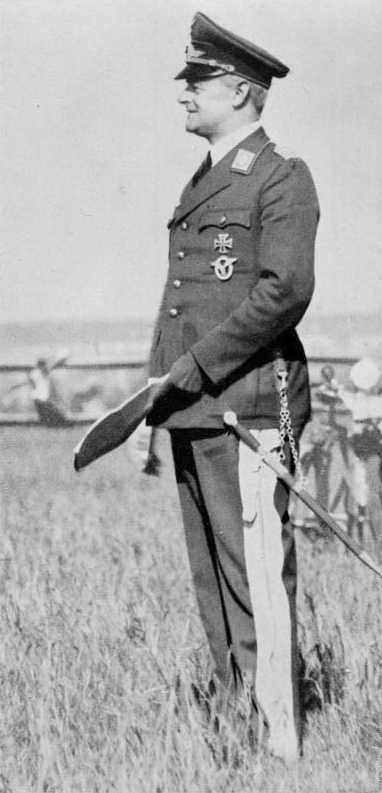
General Wever

Stumpff argued for Milch to lead procurement, technical matters and production while the General Staff governed field commands, war planning, training and operations while Milch proposed creating two commands with equal footing in a calculated move to undermine the chief of staff. Jeschonnek opposed his superior in favour of Milch. In a memo to Göring in January 1938, Jeschonnek said the General Staff should be "free of ballast", kept small and concerned only with operational level matters. Jeschonnek's proposals were anathema to Wever's view on supply and maintenance: "Do not say — That is not the General Staff's work." Göring ignored Stumpff and in February 1938 created the post of General Inspector of the Luftwaffe to report directly to him and supervise the ten air force directorates. The directorates were permitted to report to Stumpff on supply-maintenance matters.

Failing to convince his peers in the strategic and technical aspects, Jeschonnek sought to fulfil his duty to Hitler, who he viewed as a personal hero. On 7 November 1938, the Nazi leadership proposed a five-fold increase in the strength of the Luftwaffe. Jeschonnek published plans for an air force of 10,700 aircraft by 1 January 1942 – with 5,000 bombers — but ran into opposition at an OKL conference on 28 November. Most of the staff officers opposed the program on the basis Germany lacked the raw materials for such an expansion. Jeschonnek, argued for blind trust and obedience to Hitler: "I take the view that it is our duty not to let down the Führer. If he has ordered this program he also knows the means by which it can be carried out." Jeschonnek preferred to leave the technicalities of production to others, namely Milch and the unqualified Udet. He showed a distinct lack of interest in these dull non-operational matters and, as a consequence, the chasm between the ambitions of the General Staff and Udet's production planners widened before the war started. Milch attempted to humiliate Jeschonnek in front of Göring, but was left speechless when Göring supported Jeschonnek's plans.

On 1 February 1939, Jeschonnek replaced Stumpff as the Chief of the General Staff of the Luftwaffe (Chef des Generalstabs der Luftwaffe). On 14 August 1939, he was promoted to Generalmajor (Brigadier General). Jeschonnek had the intelligence to hold such a senior rank, but his lack of experience of higher command, in either peace or wartime, in an increasingly complex and large organisation, meant he could not control it. As one analyst wrote, "From the colonelcy on, his advancement was precipitous and unsound. Facing heavy responsibilities to which he was unequal became his fate." A second concluded Jeschonnek's thinking on air matters was too short-sighted and immature for the position entrusted to him. Jeschonnek's education played a part. He underestimated the importance of technology upon operations and his denigration of engineers was typical of the Luftwaffe leadership from Göring down. Most Luftwaffe officers were graduates of the classical schools (Humanistische Gymnasien) rather than technical schools (Real-gymnasien). Only five percent of the officers, not including Jeschonnek, had technical degrees. These limitations emphasised the Wehrmacht's weakness in emphasising tactical and operational study over intelligence and logistics.

Jeschonnek's rapid promotions perhaps reflected his devotion to Hitler and National Socialism. Jeschonnek never questioned Hitler's policies and took his Führer's word on important matters. Jeschonnek was a member of the Nazi Party, along with several others in the higher echelons of the Luftwaffe, which earned it a reputation as a Nazi service. The efforts to imbue Luftwaffe staff officers in general with ideology, however, were no more successful in the air force than in the army. Later on, in 1944, the SS proposed the Luftwaffe be placed under its command due to the perceived lack of commitment to National Socialism. Jeschonnek's attraction to the new regime was rooted in his Prussian officer training which stressed discipline, austere self-denial in the performance of duty, and subordination to the military hierarchy. Jeschonnek strove to personify this ideal. Hitler emphasized this tradition in his speeches and proclamations to Prussianism and its virtues.

The elevation of youthful officers of exemplary military bearing was encouraged by Hitler and his closest paladin, Reichsmarschall Hermann Göring, commander-in-chief of the Luftwaffe. Göring preferred the qualities of younger officers, rather than men who had been his seniors, for they expressed typical "High Command views." The appointment also suited Göring's own interests as, if the Luftwaffe failed, he could shift the blame to them. As time wore on, Göring's persistent reproaches to Jeschonnek reduced him to a mere operations aid, regardless of how vigorously he defended his own policies.

Eventually, their relationship deteriorated. Göring felt threatened by his chief of staff and the commander-in-chief and frequently bypassed Jeschonnek and avoided his advice. Göring's decisions were amateurish and destructive. Jeschonnek lacked the personality to challenge Göring and could do little but deal with the consequences. Jeschonnek's inferiority in age and rank undermined his authority when dealing with other forceful, ruthless staff officers and field commanders in the mold of Felmy, Kesselring, Hugo Sperrle or Wolfram Freiherr von Richthofen.

=== Chief of Staff ===
The air ministry was reorganised upon Jeschonnek's appointment. The Chief of Staff was again directly subordinated to Göring for operational matters. Jeschonnek communicated brief minutes of staff meetings to State Secretary Milch. The competition for power and influence soon devolved into a power struggle which played a part in the decline of the Luftwaffe. A consequence of this reorganisation was that Jeschonneks's area of responsibility was restricted. Training and weapons inspectorates were put under the Director of Training, subordinated to Milch, in his capacity as Inspector General of the Luftwaffe. Jeschonnek's workload was reduced but it deprived him of direct influence upon training and slowed the Operations Staff's evaluation of combat experiences. To correct this, the office General for Special Assignments or Purposes (General zur besonderen Verwendung) was created to combine all inspectorates in September 1939 and it had orders to work closely with Jeschonnek. Branch I (Operations), Branch III (Training) and Branch V (Foreign Air Forces) were the only elements that remained under Jeschonnek's direct command. Organisation, maintenance, supply, armament, were all placed under the new office's Quartermaster general. Jeschonnek appointed Oberstleutnant Otto Hoffmann von Waldau as head of operations in the General Staff.

The influence of Jeschonnek on the Luftwaffe during this time as chief of staff was overwhelmingly negative. Jeschonnek struggled to convince older officers that his view of air power was the right one. Jeschonnek's vision of air power was deeply flawed suggesting he had not been indoctrinated with contemporary trends in air doctrine. Jeschonnek held the view future wars should be fought with high intensity and ended quickly. The air arm, he held, must be fully committed and all reserves and material put into frontline action. No combat-trained personnel, including flight instructors, could be held back. Such an approach may have provided maximum effectiveness at the beginning of a war, but it effectively mortgaged the Luftwaffe's future.

Hermann Plocher, chief of the operations staff, urged Jeschonnek to reconsider and prepare for a long war but his superior rejected the warning. Specifically, Plocher warned Jeschonnek on the need for a prompt build-up of reserves in both flying personnel and aircraft, insisting that only by a continuous flow of reinforcements through training and further production could the losses that were to be expected in case of war be made good to some extent, so that the operational strength of the units would not drop too quickly below an irreducible minimum. Jeschonnek insisted "We must conduct a short war; everything must therefore be thrown into action at the outset." This decision, which remained unaltered to his suicide in 1943, left the Luftwaffe unprepared to fight a war of attrition against an enemy coalition.

Jeschonnek did not prepare for contingencies either. As Chief of Staff, he was responsible for doing so regardless of his personal preferences. His willingness to take Hitler's assurances that a long war would not occur reflected his belief that Hitler was a political and military genius whose views aligned with his own preconceptions of how to fight future wars. Hitler's 23 May 1939 speech on the subject particularly impressed Jeschonnek. One historian wrote: "Jeschonnek did not have the judgement necessary for his post."

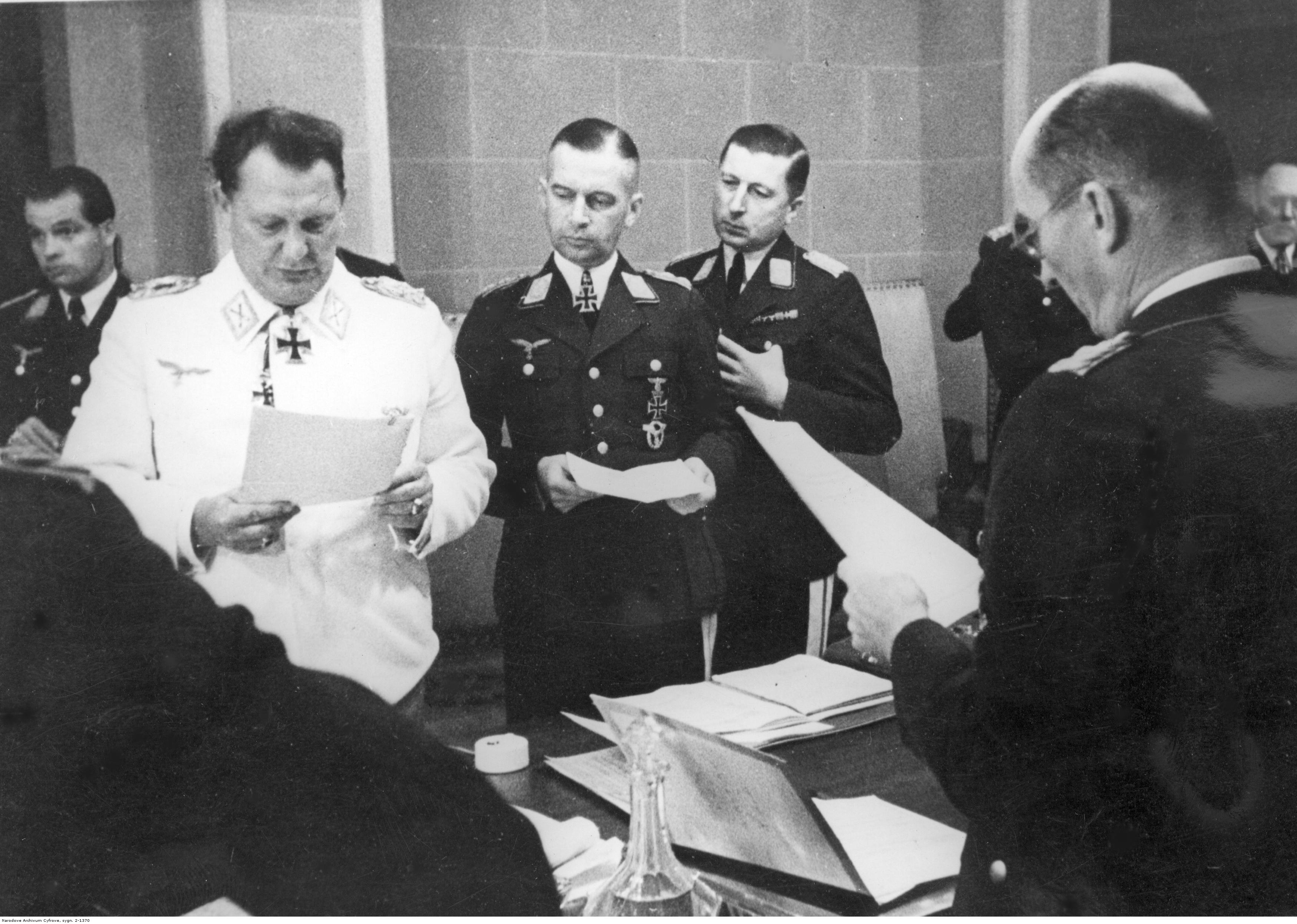
Jeschonnek with Göring, 1941, before the deterioration of their relationship

Jeschonnek had experienced the difficulty in level bombing with KG 152 and with Ernst Udet, became a strong advocate of the dive-bomber. Jeschonnek's support of Udet's idea to add dive-bombing capability to all conventional bomber aircraft delayed and retarded the development and production of promising level-bomber designs damaging the German war effort. For his part, Udet was also promoted to a station he was not educated to handle. He was appointed head of technical departments including the Office of Air Armament, where he controlled research and development. Udet did not possess the technical or engineering skills for the post and was a dreadful administrator. Despite Udet's personal limitations, 26 departments reported directly to him.

Jeschonnek was not inclined to be advised by subordinates. He had a tendency to be sarcastic and abrasive toward junior officers. He was awkward at social events and preferred the company of a small number of intimates. Jeschonnek lacked the personality to inspire subordinates and has been described as a "cold intellectual." General der Flieger Rudolf Meister, Hoffmann von Waldau’s successor as Chief of the Luftwaffe Operations Staff, said most of the time his staff were left in the dark, “Jeschonnek never reported any of the details to me. Jeschonnek generally didn’t allow his Operations Staff to advise him. Decisions were made during the morning in the Command Post, so that the Operations Staff was usually faced with a fait accompli." General Meister found Jeschonnek difficult to approach, and was thus unable to exercise much influence. “Jeschonnek was cool, polite, but abrupt.”

In a discussion with the out-going Chief of the Luftwaffe Operations Staff, Paul Deichmann, Jeschonnek opposed the heavy bomber idea with his assertion that the goal was to hit the target with the fewest bombs, even industrial targets, to eliminate them. A dive-bomber such as the Junkers Ju 88, according to him, could achieve this. When it was pointed out the Ju 88 did not have the necessary range and speed to evade defences and carry out strategic bombing, Jeschonnek declined to discuss the matter further. It was arrogance "characteristic of Jeschonnek that he believed he alone had the experience to judge such matters." Göring, Udet and Jeschonnek viewed the type as a "wonder bomber."

The Ural bomber project, founded by Wever and continued by Kesselring and Stumpf, took shape in the Heinkel He 177. The aircraft became the only heavy bomber to enter service in significant numbers. When Jeschonnek and Udet visited a mock-up in 1939, they endorsed its "crash production." However, the type was to be fitted with dive brakes, but whether this was at the behest of the Technical Office (Technische Amt) or the General Staff has not been established. Once Jeschonnek had adopted a concept of aerial warfare that made him an advocate of so-called blitzkrieg ideas, he may have given no further thought to a war against a large industrial power such as the Soviet Union and any requirement for a heavy bomber.

Jeschonnek saw air warfare predominantly in terms of combat aircraft. He did nothing to develop transport aircraft or reconnaissance aeroplanes. Wilhem Wimmer's production programs rectified this by September 1939, but these forces suffered as the war progressed. Jeschonnek's concern with short-war preparations, especially with tactical aircraft at the expense of strategic bombers did more than any other officer to divert the Luftwaffe from the broadly-based doctrine advocated by Kesselring and Wever, men who regarded the bomber, operational level and strategic operations as a priority. Jeschonnek, the long-term aviator, possessed a much more short-sighted view of airpower than the former army officers. Jeschonnek's advocacy of joint operations with the army did not prevent the General Staff carrying out war games to test navigational aids and specialist pathfinder units, an essential prerequisite to effective night bombing operations.

Army support operations were still of vital importance. Throughout the 1920s, airmen had been trained in this function. The Spanish Civil War experiences by the Condor Legion helped perfect tactics and techniques required in organising and coordinating operations with land forces. The experience permitted large numbers of airmen to gain the navigational skills necessary to carry out future strategic bombing operations. In June 1939, Jeschonnek penned a study in which he wrote, "[close air support] is the most difficult mission that could be given to the air force" and it required "the closest liaison between Luftwaffe commanders and the supported army units." Richthofen, who served as chief of staff to Hugo Sperrle in the Condor Legion, had already solved many of these issues and his operations in Spain, influenced the plans for the attack on Poland in 1939.

Jeschonnek was especially impressed by the effect the Luftwaffe had on ground operations in Spain. He understood ground-support would be achieved primarily through aerial interdiction, but diverted vast resources to the close air support mission. In 1939, Jeschonnek formed the "close battle division" (Nahkampfdivision) under the command of Richthofen, the ground-support specialist. The emphasis placed on ground-support training allowed the Luftwaffe to take the lead in close support operations and arguably it was the most capable air force in the world in that field by the outbreak of World War II.

== World War II ==
In June 1939 during the General Staff Ride, Jeschonnek stated unequivocally that upon the declaration of hostilities the Luftwaffe should not direct all its power to destroying the enemy air force(s). Close air support operations for the army were the most important. His remarks were a repudiation of aerial doctrine established by his mentor, Wever and Helmuth Wilberg in the 1920s and 1930s, in Conduct of the Air War to which Jeschonnek had contributed.

German air leaders had been required by doctrine to establish air superiority at the start of war. Jeschonnek reneged on this point just prior to the outbreak of war, in which he stated that land support operations should only supplant the air superiority mission if they offered "the possibility of bringing about unconditional, immediate, and sensible results." As the Luftwaffe prepared for Case White, German air power made preparations to destroy enemy air forces within the first hours. One analysis wrote that Jeschonnek gave vacillating and contradictory directives at this time.

On 1 September 1939, the Wehrmacht (German Armed Forces) invaded Poland beginning World War II. By the time of the war, the OKL (Luftwaffe High Command) had resolved some of the crucial issues facing their service as it transitioned to the next generation of aircraft in 1937 and 1938. German anti-aircraft forces, airborne forces (Fallschirmjäger) and close support capabilities allowed it to make an impact other European powers could not match in 1939.

There remained fundamental problems in the character of its leadership. Göring, Udet, Milch and Jeschonnek could not think in the long-term. In the interests of production, they restricted development to a few aircraft, namely, the He 177, Ju 88 and Messerschmitt Me 210. The decision was not meant to halt research and development into other types of aircraft, but it did irreparable damage in that area and this mistake was not recognised until 1942. By then it was too late. The Luftwaffe fought the battles of 1943–44 with essentially the same designs it had in 1939.

=== Early triumphs ===
The German invasion of Poland was made possible by the August 1939 Molotov–Ribbentrop Pact, in which Nazi Germany and the Soviet Union divided Poland's territories between them, while the latter power granted generous economic aid to Hitler. Jeschonnek had briefed Göring on the planned invasion on 25 April 1939. A total of 2,152 combat aircraft were assembled in Luftflotte 1 and 4.

Jeschonnek called the German Embassy in Moscow on the morning of 1 September 1939 to request that the Soviet Union keep the Minsk radio station identifying itself, so that German bomber pilots could use it for navigational purposes. The Polish Air Force and Polish Army offered fierce resistance though by 14 September the former offered only sporadic resistance. The campaign proceeded successfully, until a Polish counter-attack known as the Battle of Bzura. The OKL was shocked into considering Operation Wasserkante — the codename for the bombing of Warsaw.

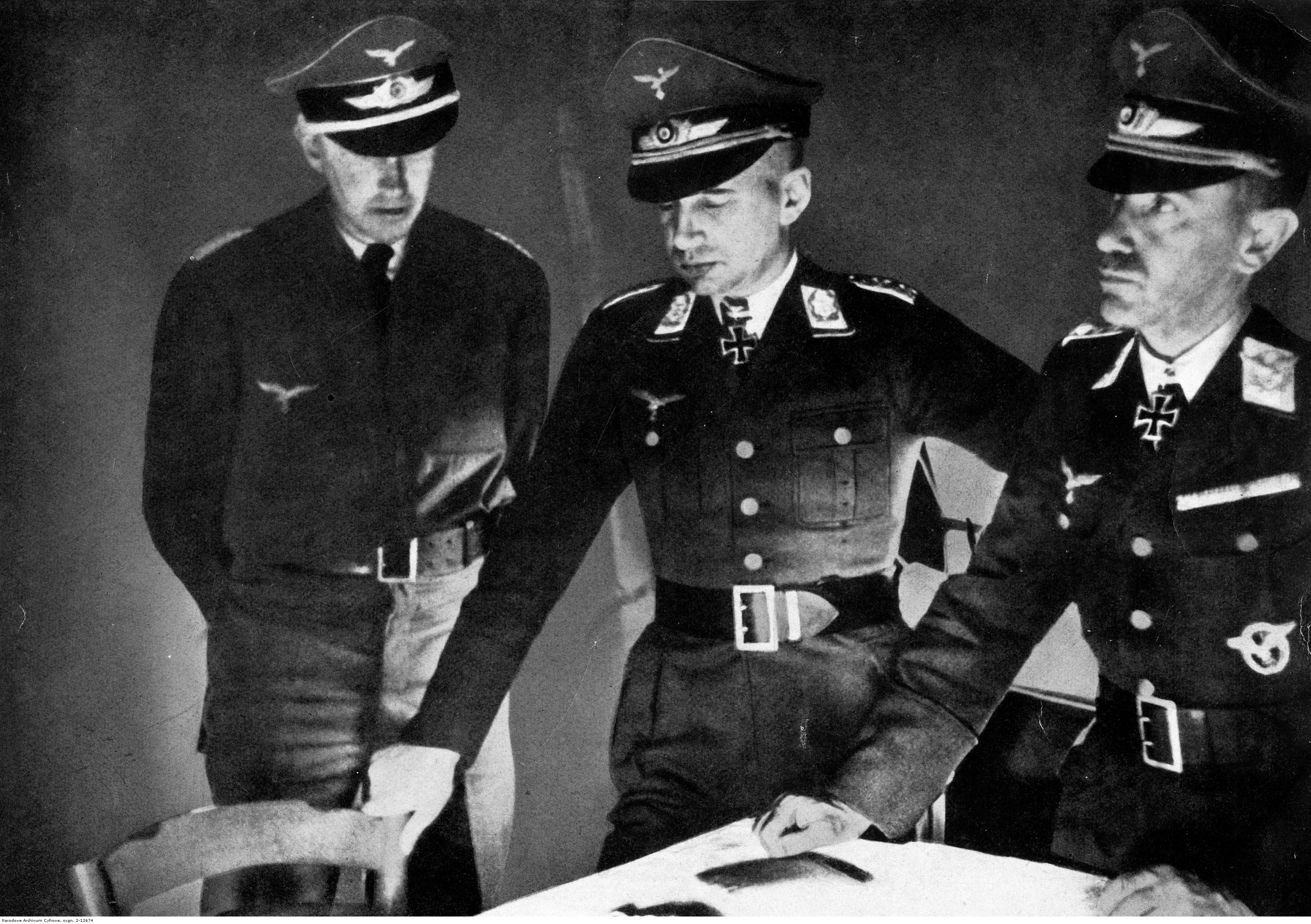
Jeschonnek (centre) with Alexander Löhr (right), March 1942

Jeschonnek telephoned Alexander Löhr, commanding Luftflotte 4 on 13 September and demanded an incendiary bomb attack on northern Warsaw. The Ghetto, due north of the Danzig Railway Station, may have been factored into the operation. A small contingent of KG 4, just two staffeln (squadrons), under the command of Martin Fiebig dropped 50:50 load of incendiaries and high explosive bombs. The Fliegerdivision 1 unit dropped 7,000 incendiaries and Fiebig reported to Jeschonnek that the Ghetto was burning. The OKL rejected requests made by Richthofen on 22 September for an "experiment as devastation and terror raid" as the bombing in the Siege of Warsaw had already destroyed 10 percent of the city, damaged 40 percent, and killed perhaps as many as 40,000 people including a probable total of 6,000 non-combatants. Jeschonnek refused the order, for the purpose of bombing Warsaw to hasten its capitulation, "no more than that."

Jeschonnek was awarded the Knight's Cross of the Iron Cross on 27 October 1939, after Poland was defeated. Within days of the defeat Jeschonnek was ordered to assist in the planning of Fall Gelb (Case Yellow), an invasion of Belgium and France, scheduled to begin on 12 November 1939. The OKW (Oberkommando der Wehrmacht) protested due to the unpreparedness of the armed forces at that time. Göring and Jeschonnek objected to the exclusion of the Netherlands from invasion. Hitler was unmoved, and so Jeschonnek approached the OKW warning that the British may use Dutch airfields to attack the Ruhr. On 14 November the OKW conceded the point. Jeschonnek proved to be very anxious to occupy the Netherlands; he approached Alfred Jodl on 6 February 1940, to suggest guaranteeing Belgian neutrality for assurances the Netherlands was to be invaded, with Denmark and Norway. Hitler acquiesced to Jeschonnek's proposals on 20 November 1939.

The chief of staff began discussions to work out how the Luftwaffe would best support Gelb. In a discussion with Jodl, Jeschonnek examined the feasibility of the Luftwaffe pinning down the enemy in northern France several days before the offensive in the west began. The plan was initially accepted. Weather conditions postponed the offensive throughout the winter. On 11 January 1940, Jeschonnek argued the attack to support the invasions of the Low Countries could not start for three days — the Luftwaffe would then carry out preliminary attacks against Allied air bases before the land invasion began on 17 January. The same day, the Mechelen Incident occurred. The plans were scrapped, and the Manstein Plan invoked in February. The offensive was postponed until May.

In the intervening period Göring sought permission to attack docks and shipyards in Britain, but Hitler refused to allow the diversion of the air effort until Fall Gelb had begun and bases had been acquired in the Low Countries. OKW Directive Number 9 allowed for the aerial and naval mine-laying of British ports and estuaries. Fliegerdivision 9 was formed under Joachim Coeler for this purpose. There was a severe shortage of mines and aircraft. Jeschonnek did not help and refused to release Heinkel He 111, Dornier Do 17, or the Dornier Do 217, then under development, for naval operations. Despite Jeschonnek's lack of cooperation in the war at sea, he was approached by Großadmiral Erich Raeder, commander-in-chief of the Kriegsmarine (Navy) to assist in planning the invasions of Denmark and Norway, Operation Weserübung. A directive for the invasion was published on 1 March 1940. Göring complained to Hitler that 110 officers of the OKL had been informed of the operation before him. He was also incensed that Luftwaffe units had been subordinated to the army. Jodl and Jeschonnek were forced to work out a compromise whereby requests to combat forces by the army were filtered through the OKL, which issued the orders. The Luftwaffe played a vital role in the seven-week Norwegian Campaign.

On 10 May 1940, Gelb began and concluded on 3 June with the conquest of the Netherlands and Belgium and the expulsion of the British Army from Dunkirk. The second phase of the operation, Fall Rot, was complete in three weeks. The dive-bomber played an important role in the Battle of France and in Norway which, for a time, vindicated Jeschonnek's vision of warfare.

Jeschonnek and Göring's campaign was not flawless. In the midst of the Battle of Hannut, Richthofen's Fliegerkorps VIII was ordered to assist the German breakthrough at Sedan the day after the beginning of the Hannut tank battle. Richthofen did not know of Jeschonnek's intentions until the day, which showed a lack of competent staff work and staff officers. With the breakthrough in jeopardy, a compromise was reached. Richthofen was required to send only partial forces to Sedan because of logistics.

On 24 May the OKW ordered German forces to halt the advance on Dunkirk. Jeschonnek fully supported Göring's boast that the Luftwaffe could destroy the pocket and prevent the Dunkirk evacuation. The failure of the German air offensive allowed the British to withdraw the bulk of the regular army from the continent.

The remainder of the campaign proceeded rapidly. France surrendered on 25 June 1940. Jeschonnek shared in the success of the Luftwaffe. On 19 July 1940 Jeschonnek was promoted to General der Flieger at the age of 40.

=== War against Britain ===
Following the Armistice of 22 June 1940, the OKW believed the war was as good as won. The prevailing euphoria was shared by Göring and the OKL. Nevertheless, on 30 June 1940 Göring issued a directive, ordering the OKL to establish plans for an air superiority operation over England if necessary. The directive concluded, "[for] as long as the enemy air force is not destroyed, it is the basic principle of the conduct of air war to attack the enemy air units at every possible favourable opportunity—by day and night, in the air, and on the ground—without regard for other missions." Göring hoped that achieving victory in the air battle would avoid an invasion of Britain by persuading the Churchill Government to either submit to, or reach a peace settlement with, Germany.

The British rejected Hitler's peace overtures. In response, Hitler prepared a contingency, Operation Sea Lion (Seelöwe), an amphibious landing in Britain. At a Sea Lion conference in Berlin on 31 July 1940, no Luftwaffe representative was present and Göring ignored summonses by Hitler to conferences aimed at inter-service co-operation. His deputy, Jeschonnek was more proactive. He attended a conference with Hitler on 18 July to discuss general military strategy against Britain. Hitler openly mused about Stalin's unfriendliness and told those present, an invasion of the Soviet Union was a fall-back strategy if Sea Lion was abandoned. The same day Göring and his Luftflotten commanders met at Carinhall, but discussed only peripheral matters concerning the coming air offensive, named Operation Eagle Attack.

While the army and navy made tentative steps toward planning an amphibious assault, the OKL was engaged in an internal debate about which target sets should be attacked to attain control of the air. On 11 July Jeschonnek ordered that coastal shipping should be attacked as a prelude to the main battle against the Royal Air Force. The two Luftflotten commanders, Sperrle and Kesselring, pre-empted Jeschonnek's order as the indecision of the OKL had left them with little else to do. The aerial operations against shipping in the English Channel began, what the German airmen called, the Kanalkampf phase of the Battle of Britain.

Sperrle and Kesselring miscalculated, or were misled by intelligence, into underestimating the number of fighter aircraft available to Fighter Command—they put the RAF total at 450 aircraft when the real figure was 750. Chronic intelligence failures on British production, defence systems and aircraft performance inhibited the German air operation throughout the battle. Joseph Schmid, Jeschonnek's chief intelligence officer, was primarily responsible for providing inaccurate and distorted information to senior German air commanders encouraging enormous over-confidence.

As the Battle of Britain progressed Jeschonnek, Göring and Kesselring came to believe the overly optimistic victory reports by German airmen and the false intelligence from Schmid suggesting RAF Fighter Command was on the verge of collapse. The intelligence was a factor in encouraging Göring to shift the air effort to London on 7 September, in a move to bring the last of Fighter Command's into battle. Only Sperrle objected. Sperrle estimated British fighter strength at 1,000, a far more accurate assessment. On 14 September 1940, Hitler was critical of the leadership and suspicious of their combat reports in a meeting with Jeschonnek. Jeschonnek regarded the air battle as won, and pressed Hitler for a bombing campaign against London, to be enacted as a final blow.

Hitler wanted to maintain the threat of invasion by continuing air attacks on military and public utility targets in the British capital. Jeschonnek felt that military and civilian industries were located too far apart to achieve a collapse of morale by attacking the former. Instead, he pressed for attacks against residential areas. Hitler refused. He ordered that only military targets in London were to bombed. Jeschonnek regarded London as a target before the commencement of Eagle, a view shared by other senior officers.

Jeschonnek's strategy found no support from Göring. In a conversation with Jeschonnek, Göring asked his chief of staff if he really thought the British would capitulate. Jeschonnek responded that the German people would not under the same circumstances, but the British were weaker. Göring did not doubt British resolve. On 15 September large daylight raids against London were repulsed by the RAF. The nighttime Blitz began in earnest as the daylight battles subsided, as it was the only way to continue the air war against Britain. Post-war analysis has disproven the myth that the German decision to attack London and abandon the offensive against airfields saved Fighter Command; British defences remained largely intact.

Hours before the Coventry attack, Göring went on holiday and placed Milch in command of the Luftwaffe. Jeschonnek, unwilling to serve under his enemy, followed Göring's example. Neither returned to duty until late January 1941. The Blitz did not impair the British war effort substantially. The bombing did enormous damage to cities—Plymouth, Southampton, Coventry, London, Cardiff, Bristol, Birmingham, Belfast, Sheffield, Hull and Manchester were heavily bombed with some effect on production. The Liverpool Blitz proved very damaging to the docks and shipping. In general the OKL failed to develop a proper strategy during the night campaign. The discussions at the highest levels of the Luftwaffe revolved around aerial tactics rather than strategy and the campaign became increasingly aimless. Approximately 40,000 people were killed and 46,000 injured by the time the bombing ended in June 1941.

The technical aspects of the campaign became more difficult in 1941. The British counter-measures from February 1941 were affecting the accuracy of bombing. Jeschonnek's solution to carrying out effective strategic bombing without a heavy bomber, (for which he was partially responsible), was to commit a select few of his highly trained air crew for surgical strikes on important industrial targets. These operations offered a chance of success, but were mere pinpricks which risked irreplaceable crews. German losses in aircraft were heavy, but the loss of trained and experienced air crews did more to undermine the strength of the Luftwaffe. On the eve on Hitler's invasion of the Soviet Union, the German bomber force had 200 fewer bombers than on 10 May 1940.

=== Atlantic and Mediterranean ===
In late 1940, Jeschonnek and the OKL were ordered to make preparations for assisting Benito Mussolini after the failed Italian invasion of Egypt and Italian invasion of Greece in September and October 1940. On a visit to Rome Jeschonnek found the Regia Aeronautica (Italian Air Force) to be in dire need of support. Jeschonnek refrained from offering the Italians large quantities of equipment for he, like other racially prejudiced officers, did not think the Italians capable of utilising German aircraft effectively. Prejudice and the prevailing view the war would be short, led the OKL to believe aiding Italy was a waste of effort. This view ensured the eventual loss of North Africa to the Axis powers.

Jeschonnek did agree to releasing the specialist maritime interdiction formation, Fliegerkorps X to Sicily. On 14 December 1940, 14,389 men, 226 combat aircraft with 31 transports were ordered to Italy and North Africa, to mine the Suez and cut the Mediterranean Sea lanes. The air corps immediately engaged in bombing targets in Malta. Jeschonnek and Hitler saw the immediate danger the island represented and encouraged Mussolini to "reduce" it. The failure of the OKL to develop an aerial torpedo before the war had a detrimental effect on operations in the Mediterranean. Jeschonnek, on Hitler's expressed orders, hastily made preparations for creation of such a unit. Until October 1940, Jeschonnek ignored the development of aerial torpedoes.

Jeschonnek involved himself in the Balkans Campaign—the German invasion of Yugoslavia and the invasion of Greece. Jeschonnek supported the use of paratrooper forces in the Battle of Crete and Kurt Student's desire to use Crete as a staging post for invasions of Cyprus and Suez canal regions. Jeschonnek flew to Athens to oversee the Crete invasion. In the midst of the battle, he received news the Bismarck had sunk. He sent an Enigma machine message, intercepted by Ultra, enquiring into the whereabouts of his staff's son, a midshipman, on board.

The victory in Crete came too late for the Axis to exploit it, particularly dissent in Iraq. Nevertheless, Hitler ordered German air support for the insurgents upon the advice of diplomat Fritz Grobba. Jeschonnek ordered Walter Junck, commanding Jagdfliegerführer 3 (Jafü 3—Fighter Flying Leader) in France, to Iraq to form Fliegerführer Irak (Flying Command Iraq). The operation was a disaster an ended on 1 June 1941 with the loss of 19 aircraft. Misled by Grobba, Jeschonnek had Junck court-martialled but the older officer was acquitted. The inadequacies of the Italians encouraged Jeschonnek to propose Kesselring be sent to the Mediterranean to support the siege of Malta and the North African Campaign. A consequence of this suggestion led to Göring ordering Kesselring and his entire air fleet, Luftflotte 2, to the theatre. The redeployment of Kesselring's air power from the Eastern Front in October 1941 irrevocably weakened the Luftwaffe in the Soviet Union.

Jeschonnek's brothers served in the Kriegsmarine (Navy) and he was sympathetic to the desire of the navy to have adequate air support in the Battle of the Atlantic. Karl Dönitz, flag officer for U-boats, took control of one unit in early 1941, which was soon wrested back by Göring. A compromise was agreed and a command created, Fliegerführer Atlantik (Flying Commander Atlantic) under Luftwaffe control. Anti-shipping operations did not receive the attention required through the war; Göring's intransigence and other theatres attracted German air strength. On 5 September 1942, Ulrich Kessler, commanding the formation remarked to Jeschonnek Fliegerführer Atlantik was like a "living corpse" and should be disbanded. Kessler bemoaned the withdrawal of bomber units for bombing Britain and that cutting off "shipping space" was the only way to defeat Britain. In February 1943, with the battle reaching a climax, Dönitz demanded long-range aircraft from Göring but was rebuffed on the grounds no suitable aircraft was available. Hitler intervened and ordered six Blohm & Voss BV 222 into the Atlantic. Jeschonnek prevaricated and they did not become available until the summer. Only four Junkers Ju 290s and 10 modified Ju 88H aircraft were made available before the defeat of U-boats in Black May.

In a notable success, the battleships Scharnhorst and Gneisenau and the cruiser Prinz Eugen completed a raiding sortie into the Atlantic Ocean. Trapped in the port of Brest, France, they came under air attack from RAF Bomber Command. On 12 January 1942 at East Prussia (Wolf's Lair), Hitler ordered their risky withdrawal through the English Channel. The Luftwaffe was ordered to provide air cover and diversion air raids. Jeschonnek promised around 250 aircraft, but refused to reinforce the Channel region with fighter aircraft. Unternehmen Donnerkeil (Operation Thunderbolt) became the codename for the air cover plan. The existence of the operation was so secret that both Jeschonnek and Galland had to sign secrecy pledges as they left Hitler's Headquarters. Donnerkeil was a success for the Luftwaffe which lost just 22 aircraft.

From 1943, the Luftwaffe focused on the Mediterranean Theatre as the area for maritime interdiction. Generalmajor Johannes Fink was appointed to command Fliegerdivision 2 in November 1942 based in Marseille. Fink advocated an aggressive campaign in the western Mediterranean and proposed attacking every eastbound convoy with his two units KG 26 (torpedoes) and KG 100 (missiles). Elements of KG 77 were beginning to convert to torpedoes at this time to bolster combat power. Fink offered his resignation to Jeschonnek if refused his way. Only 26 ships were sunk from January to August 1943 and the division failed to prevent the fall of Tunisia in May 1943. Jeschonnek's successor Gunther Korten made plans to increase the power of anti-shipping forces but they were increasingly marginalised by late 1943.

=== War on the Soviet Union ===
On 22 June 1941 the Wehrmacht commenced Operation Barbarossa, the invasion of the Soviet Union. Before the campaign began, Jeschonnek remarked, "at last a proper war!" The chief of the general staff had paid minimal attention to the attrition that had taken place in the Battle of Britain and preceding Battle of France. The decision to attack the largest nation in the world with an air force that quantitatively was the same size as it had been the previous year and that was weaker in crew experience and training, was to prove a grave error. On 27 February 1941, Jeschonnek informed Franz Halder that the aircraft to airspace ratio was low and that only essential areas could be guaranteed air support. In turn, the OKW warned the army field commanders to expect greater exposure to enemy air attacks than in previous campaigns.

The campaign opened with successes. The Red Air Force suffered debilitating losses, and the German army advanced to the outskirts of Leningrad, Rostov and Moscow. By the end of 1941 it was clear Barbarossa had failed. Luftwaffe combat strength was precarious. In bombing power the Luftwaffe had hardly any capability left. In December 1941, the bomber force possessed only 47.1 percent of its authorized strength; only 51 percent of that force was in commission. Thus, from an authorised strength of 1,950 bombers, the Luftwaffe had only 468 in commission on 6 December 1941, or 24 percent of authorised aircraft. Overall strength fell from 3,451 in June to 2,749 in December 1941. Udet, Göring and Jeschonnek all shared a proportion of the blame.

Milch's 1942 production program, the "Göring program," was predicated on a Soviet defeat. The army's failure at Moscow created difficulties in increasing aircraft production. Hitler ordered industry to abandon the plan as army losses and operations continued on the Eastern Front. Milch told Jeschonnek this signalled a reduction in productive capability in the aircraft industry; and more difficulties in finding labour and raw materials.

Milch replaced Udet after the latter's suicide and strove to increase production. In the OKL, there remained considerable scepticism as to the size of the plan. In March 1942, Jeschonnek objected to Milch's call for increases in fighter production. Jeschonnek purportedly said, "I do not know what I should do with more than 360 fighters!" By June 1942, Jeschonnek had modified his view and agreed on a need for a monthly production of at least 900 fighters by the winter of 1943/44. One historian wrote, "in view of the attrition rates of 1940 and 1941, Jeschonnek's March comment can only be described as remarkable." Jeschonnek maintained the Luftwaffe was an offensive weapon and though he sympathised with Adolf Galland, General der Jagdflieger, he continued to build assault units and develop ground-attack pilots at the expense of the Jadgwaffe. Jeschonnek was firmly of the view that the defeat of the Soviet Union, not air defence, was the prerequisite to a successful prosecution of the war. Hitler and Göring supported the dominance of the bomber over fighter production.

Through 1942, the size of the Luftwaffe on the Eastern Front diminished. In mid-November the Battle of Stalingrad headed towards disaster when several Axis armies were encircled. In an attempt to regain lost prestige, Göring assured Hitler the armies could be supplied by air. Jeschonnek and the general staff agreed to the airlift with scarcely a comment. On the 24 November Richthofen noted a series of conversations in which he urged an immediate breakout. Jeschonnek apparently had no opinion. His silence ensured the OKH received no air staff support in its effort to persuade Hitler to abandon Stalingrad and left the air arm with an impossible task of re-supplying the army in the pocket.

It transpired that Hitler and Jeschonnek had met at the Berghof days before to discuss the matter. Jeschonnek assured Hitler that the Demyansk pocket could be repeated with adequate aircraft and airfields. Hitler preferred to keep the army in Stalingrad and order Manstein to break into the city, after declaring in September that the German army would not be forced away. Jeschonnek quickly recognised his mistake when planning the technicalities of the air lift and urged Göring to warn Hitler the required tonnage could not be delivered, but his superior regarded it as too late and refused. Göring had given his word to Hitler and forbade Jeschonnek to say anything. Göring telephoned Hitler to reassure him, and even referred Hitler to Milch if he had any doubts about the details. In 1946, Milch learned of this conversation and remarked in his diary, "deceit plus incompetence equals one Reichsmarschall!" None of the general staff seemed to appreciate the atrocious conditions the air lift crews were forced to operate in. During the entire siege, the only senior officers to go to the front were von Richthofen and Milch. The latter was deprecated by other Luftwaffe generals as being "just a civilian."

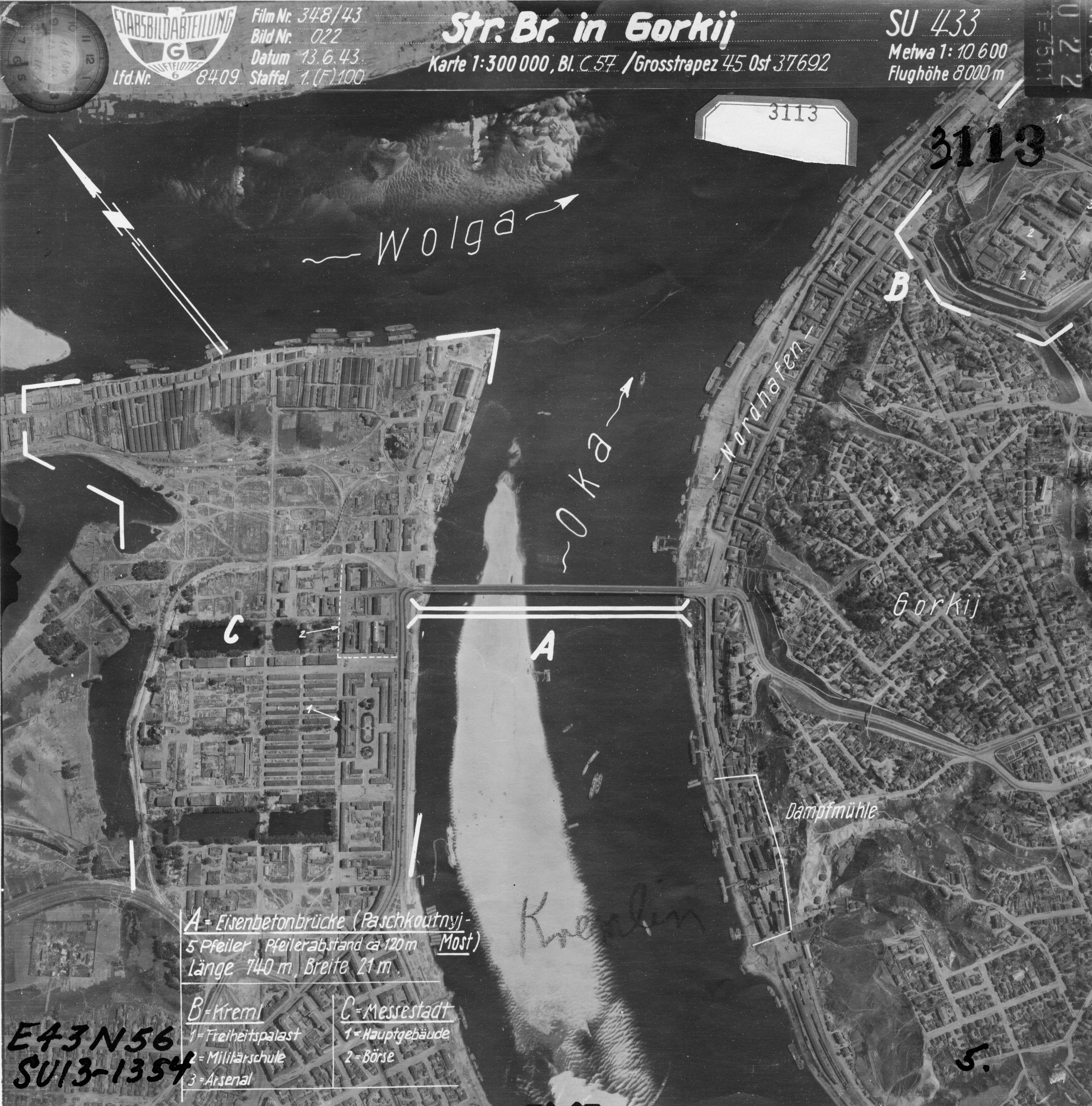
German photograph of Gorky, 13 June 1943

After the defeat at Stalingrad and the failure at Operation Blue, Jeschonnek's influence as chief of staff declined. To escape Göring, he lobbied for the command of Luftflotte 4, vacated by Richthofen in the spring, 1943. Jeschonnek, for unknown reasons, was turned down in favour of Otto Dessloch. Production increases allowed for large deliveries of aircraft for Operation Citadel in July 1943. Jeschonnek noted to Göring, that non-combat losses were severely affecting combat readiness. High attrition and reduced training time for pilots were the cause. In a belated effort to equalise the balance of power on the battlefield, Jeschonnek and his operations staff officer, Rudolf Meister, were the prime movers in attacks on industrial sectors although the army may have taken the opportunity to pressure the OKL into bombing tank factories, prior to Citadel.

In mid-1943, the General Staff came to the conclusion that the employment of dwindling German air power in support of the army was unlikely to yield strategic results. Prior to Citadel, Jeschonnek and the OKL explored and executed a strategic bombing campaign against Soviet armaments industries, along with more familiar operational level missions. The interdiction of rail transport was reasonably successful, but prior to the offensive Jeschonnek noted that, "Luftwaffe strength was not sufficient to guarantee victory." One historian observed "the fact Jeschonnek regarded Luftwaffe strength as inadequate even for the tasks of directly supporting Citadel, provides yet another example of the inability of the Luftwaffe leadership to make ends conform to means" which exposed the gulf between doctrine and capabilities. Jeschonnek's admission was in contrast to his conversations with Robert Ritter von Greim's chief of staff, Fritz Kless, which discussed an effort to use 20–30 aircraft to carry out "terror attacks" aimed at breaking Soviet morale in cities behind the frontline.

Kless and Jeschonnek created a Generalkommando (special staff) to oversee the creation of a long-range bomber force. The strategic bomber group was independent an under the command of the OKL, not a parent air fleet. The command was to be named Supreme Air Commander East and was designated Fliegerkorps IV by Jeschonnek's successor Korten. Jeschonnek organised the air fleets for the operations and considered creating a separate staff for "target research, charged with the study and the appreciation of the Russian war industry in toto and utilising all accessible research."

Robert Ritter von Greim's Luftflotte 6, with some support from Luftflotte 4, was assigned seven bomber wings to carry out the offensive —KG 55, KG 3, KG 4, KG 27, KG 51, KG 53 and KG 100. Even Richthofen, the leading ground-support exponent, agreed to the operation. It was felt the Luftwaffe could render greater assistance to the army this way. Factory Number 24, at Kuybyshev Oblast produced a quarter of all aviation engines in the Soviet Union and 85 percent of all Ilyushin Il-2 engines, Factory Number 26 at Ufa, with 31 percent of total production and 60 percent of all fighter aircraft engine production, Factory Number 16 at Kazan, producing 12 percent of the total and 60 percent of all medium bomber aircraft engines, Factory Number 45, in Moscow, with five percent total but 15 percent of IL-2 engines, and finally Factory Number No. 466 at Gorky with five percent total and one-tenth of all fighter engine production were the targets. Three of the five ball bearings plants were in range, the synthetic rubber plant at Yaroslavl (23 percent of output) and oil refineries along with steel plants were all considered. Surviving intelligence maps show the crude oil and ball bearing plant at Saratov was also considered. In the end phase, the production of tanks and armoured vehicles received the weight of the attacks. The facilities at Gorky drew most attention for it produced 15 percent of T-34s and was the largest plant west of the Urals. In error, planners targeted the State Motor Vehicles Plant No. 1 Molotov, the largest automobile plant in the country which produced the less threatening T-60 and T-70. The Krasnoye Sormovo Factory No. 112 was targeted because of its production of munitions.

The offensive opened against Gorky on 4 June 1943. 420 bombers were dispatched and 636 tons of bombs were dropped. Seven major raids, comprising 682 sorties, were flown against Gorky and 1,105 tons of bombs were dropped. The Molotov automobile factory, which did produce T-34 parts, was severely damaged. The Krasnoye factory, remained untouched. On 9 and 20 June Yaroslavl rubber plant SK 1 was subjected to 324 tons of bombs. German intelligence selected the target based on knowledge of their own industry's vulnerability to the loss of rubber production. The plant was heavily damaged. The oil targets at Saratov received 181 tons of bombs from 12 to 15 June—SU 66 75 and SU 65 76 were bottle-necks, for despite the vast oil reserves in the Soviet Union, few plants could refine crude oil into high aviation octane fuel.

Mid-way through the offensive, Albert Speer, armaments minister, and other technocrats, drawing on the experience of RAF Bomber Command's offensive over Germany, intervened and began meddling in target selection. Speer formed a committee "Working Committee on Economic Objectives for Air Attack" on 23 June 1943. Joachim von Ribbentrop's liaison, Walther Hewel even felt the need to write to Jeschonnek on 12 June with recommendations on targets in the Soviet hinterland. Hewel's support was crucial in persuading Hitler to sanction the offensive against power plants in accordance with Jeschonnek's successor, Korten and Speer, in the autumn, 1943. The long-term effects of the bombings on Soviet military power certainly would have proven negligible, even if successful. Jeschonnek's willingness to accede to the recommendations of the army to bomb tank plants and the committee's recommendations, probably stemmed from a pre-war intelligence failure to gather proper information on the Soviet armament industry's location and potential. Such intelligence would have been redundant had Barbarossa succeeded, but the offensive's failure left the "German armed forces paying the price."

Jeschonnek supported the Kursk offensive with the vast majority of German aerial strength in the conviction the Battle of Kursk would prove to be a major victory. The Luftwaffe inflicted heavy losses to the Red Air Force, and was crucial in combating Operation Kutuzov, and preventing the encirclement of the 9th Army and 2nd Panzer Army.

Nevertheless, the ultimate failure of the Kursk offensive, following upon the German defeat in North Africa, caused even Hitler to turn against his Chief of Air Staff. Göring had already suggested to Hitler that Jeschonnek should be replaced as Chief of Air Staff, but Hitler demurred.

=== Defence of the Reich and fall ===
In 1939 RAF Bomber Command began bombing operations against German ports which set in motion one of the longest wartime campaigns for the Luftwaffe — known as the Defence of the Reich (Reichsverteidigung). On 21 September 1939, Jeschonnek issued a directive that expected German fighter forces (Jagdwaffe) to protect Germany in the manner "linked directly with the strategic [that is, offensive] concept for the continued conduct of air warfare." The majority of fighter units were to remain with their Luftflotten rather than the air defence command. In 1940, a publication issue by the OKL stated fighter forces were expected to carry out offensive and defensive operations, but "these defensive tasks are carried out in an offensive manner."

The offensive-mindedness worked well near the frontline, but it left the Fliegerkorps an Fliegerďivision with no experience in air defence and coordination with anti-aircraft forces cumbersome, for it could only be coordinated at Luftflotten level. An interim solution was the creation of the Jagfliegerführer (Fighter Command Unit-Jafü) in late 1939 to carry out all varieties of fighter operations. The early successes in France and Norway in 1940, reduced the necessity for the defence of Germany and these commands were dispatched to the English Channel. The defeat in the Battle of Britain was overshadowed by the military victories in the 1941 and 1942 Balkans Campaign and the opening phases on the Eastern Front. The entry of the United States of America into the war appeared to make little difference. The Eighth Air Force had been bloodied in 1942, and the pilots of Luftflotte 3 respected the new enemy, but Germany itself remained virtually inviolate by day in 1942. The western fighter defences seemed to be holding their own, prompting Jeschonnek to remark to one of his staff, "Galland can take care of the [daylight] defence in the west with one wing."

Jeschonnek's attitude to the American threat was contradictory. The German military attaché in Washington, D.C., General Friedrich von Boetticher, produced highly detailed reports on the B-17 Flying Fortress and American aircraft development. Jeschonnek was impressed so he sent Boetticher to see Hitler. Hitler dismissed the data after Göring convinced him the aircraft was of poor quality. Jeschonnek wrote to Boetticher, "we are lost. For years I have, on the basis of your reports, forwarded demands to Hitler and Göring, but for years my requests for expansion of the Luftwaffe have not been answered. We no longer have the air defence I requested and which is needed. Conflicting demands have been made by Hitler. We no longer have any time." One month later, he interrupted a presentation on the United States Army Air Force threat with the statement; "Every four-engine bomber the Allies build makes me happy, for we will bring these four-engine bombers down just like we brought down the two-engine ones, and the destruction of a four-engine bomber constitutes a much greater loss for the enemy." Jeschonnek's intimates knew their chief of staff understood the true situation, but he was unable to assert himself publicly, or before Hitler and Göring.

The end of 1942 was disastrous for the German war effort; Stalingrad, Alamein, the Torch landings, with the growing intensity of night attacks by Bomber Command, which merged into the Combined Bomber Offensive, strained Jeschonnek. Hitler and Göring were determined to regain the initiative and retain powerful air fleets at the fronts while increasing the size of night and day fighter forces in Germany. Jeschonnek requested a field command to escape the mounting pressure but was turned down. Thereafter, he "pressed forward" with these insurmountable ambitions. Jeschonnek hoped that the growing night and day defences would fight off the Anglo-American offensive while the Wehrmacht regained the initiative in the Soviet Union. Jeschonnek recognised the USAAF represented a different kind of threat than Bomber Command; the Americans were attempting to destroy specific targets. At the end of June 1943—Blitz Week—Jeschonnek requested an updated list from Speer as to the crucial points in the war economy that needed additional protection.

The air war had shifted from a battle along the periphery of German-occupied Europe, to a battle of attrition over Germany. In July 18.1 percent of the German fighter strength in operation on the first of that month had been lost. In August 1943, 248 single and 86 twin-engine fighters were destroyed. Ominously, American fighter escorts were gaining greater penetrations into German airspace restricting the amount of time and space German fighter pilots had to intercept American bombers. Jeschonnek and fellow staff officers had ignored the industrial, technical and logistical basis that modern wars were fought on; "that curious blindness which led him in early 1942 to wonder what the Luftwaffe would do with 360 fighters had now led his air force and nation into a hopeless situation."

Jeschonnek, left, and Hans-Georg von Seidel in 1943

Jeschonnek also failed to recognise the warning signals that British air power was growing. He still thought in terms of an offensive air force and preferred to strike back at British cities, to "fight terror with terror", a view consistent with Hitler's. German night-fighter strength was inadequate and neither Jeschonnek nor Göring had any great sympathy for the arm. Jeschonnek, according to Beppo Schmid, worked most “unwillingly on air defence." In example of Jeschonnek's disregard for air defence, he stripped 150 anti-aircraft batteries from Germany in December 1942 and sent them to Italy before the decision was reversed the following spring. The Eastern Front absorbed a large number of mobile batteries denying the Germans the ability to create strong points—one of its outstanding assets. The defences had not been brought into line with the latest technology; some 30 percent lacked ranging equipment and only 25–30 percent had their own radar. The consequences of these decisions left the Luftwaffe unable to prevent the destruction of German cities and defend their populations.

After their defeat in the Battle of the Heligoland Bight in 1939, the British abandoned daylight raids in favour of night bombing. The appointment of Arthur Harris, Air Officer Commanding (AOC) Bomber Command changed the nature of the night war. Area bombardment became the tactical method of destroying a target after the damning Butt Report in 1941. The result of improved navigational aids and new heavy bomber designs, the British carried out destructive air attacks on German cities, beginning with the attack on Lübeck in March 1942, and then the bombing of Hamburg in July 1943. In June 1940 the Luftwaffe still had no proper night fighter training school. At the end of 1941, the OKL had time to build a night fighter force capable of imposing an intolerable cost on the RAF, but the OKL chose not to do so, perhaps under the illusion the Soviet Union would soon fall and air units then released to the West for air defence. The shock effect of Hamburg on the OKL encouraged greater urgency in producing new tactics and technologies to overcome the British offensive, now the Germans had lost the lead in the battle of the beams. The Nazi leadership, in particular Speer and Joseph Goebbels were stunned by the impact which destroyed 40 percent of large firm and 80 percent of small firm production, along with 75 percent of the electrical works, 90 percent of the gas and 60 percent of water systems.

Jeschonnek, as the Chief of the General Staff, was not flexible enough to rise above the most rigid aspects of tradition and his own narrow intellectual orientation. His management of air defence was “dragging” and improvised. Suggestions to modernise and streamline air defences “remained a mystery to him." Kesselring acknowledged this, but added that, “the combining of national air defences into a single air fleet is to his credit." Jeschonnek's decision had nothing to do with farsightedness, but was a reactive measure to unfolding events.

Jeschonnek's relationship with Göring rapidly deteriorated in 1943. Göring held Jeschonnek in high esteem when German arms were successful. When their relationship first became strained, Göring presented Jeschonnek with a riding horse to repair the damage. Jeschonnek, the abrupt, frugal soldier, could never find the right approach to the informality-loving Göring. Göring often acted imperiously with his General Staff Chief, giving, as Kesselring related, “either directives which could not be fulfilled or none at all." If Jeschonnek did not handle things to suit Göring, the Reichsmarschall flew into rages. Jeschonnek withstood withering criticism which happened more frequently, since Hitler began to shut Göring out of his confidence, to deal directly with Jeschonnek: a fact which infuriated the Reichsmarschall. Jeschonnek's enemies in the OKL, Ulrich Diesing and Bernd von Brauchitsch poisoned Göring's mind against him. Beppo Schmid claimed the formation of a de facto second general staff led by von Brauchitsch was the final straw for Jeschonnek. These men often met with Göring and filtered down orders without Jeschonnek's knowledge. Another facet of the growing rift was Göring's jealousy of Jeschonnek's popularity. He forbade Jeschonnek to visit the frontline. Jeschonnek replaced Göring at briefings and frequently became the object of Hitler's criticism of the Luftwaffe. On one occasion Hitler took Jeschonnek aside and assured him the insults were not directed at him. It remains unclear when, or if, Hitler ever lost faith in Jeschonnek. Hitler was fond of Jeschonnek's abrupt Prussian style and austere lifestyle.

=== Death ===
Jeschonnek maintained an image of a hardened man but those that knew him well described him as “almost timid" and a "soft person." According to them, he "erected a wall around himself. In order to hide his inner vulnerability he assumed a cool, slightly dissatisfied and seemingly sarcastic nature in public." General Meister stated, "Göring told me that once at Karinhall, after the beginning of the Russian Campaign in 1941, Jeschonnek had a nervous breakdown, and said that the responsibility 'would be pushed off on him.' I then explained to him that I would bear the responsibility. My wife consoled the weeping man.'" Characteristics of depression and even emotional breakdowns led one historian to speculate Jeschonnek was a manic-depressive. His state of mind stemmed from the military situation. He confided to Hans-Georg von Seidel that terrible mistakes had been made and continued to be. On 12 April 1943, Heinz Guderian noted he was "resigned" and "burned out".

Jeschonnek was acutely aware he was deeply involved in the failures of the Luftwaffe; Göring could not be blamed for everything. Jeschonnek would justly be held accountable for the overestimation of the Ju 88, the He 177; in creating an air force with no reserves, unfit to fight a protracted war; in agreeing to stop aircraft development; to leave fighter production low in favour of medium bombers, and in failing to properly mobilise his 1939 armament program; in apparently underestimating the Anglo-American air threat; in agreeing to the air logistical operations at Stalingrad; in failing to develop a strategic air arm and air transport command; and too late to create air defence forces. The burden of the mistakes, and with no meaningful family connections or religious convictions to offer stability, he considered suicide. His adjutant informed Kesselring, just prior to the overthrow of Benito Mussolini, that he had needed to take a gun out of Jeschonnek's hand and warned that he might try it again.

On 17 August 1943 the USAAF carried out the Schweinfurt–Regensburg mission. The ball bearing industry was damaged but the Luftwaffe appeared to win a defensive victory. Nevertheless, Göring made an abusive phone call to Jeschonnek that afternoon. General Meister recalled they also spoke about the coordination of night fighters and anti-aircraft artillery. During the day, Meister, as usual, went out with Jeschonnek on a skiff on Gołdap lake. Afterwards, they drank champagne to celebrate Jeschonnek's daughter's birthday before parting company.

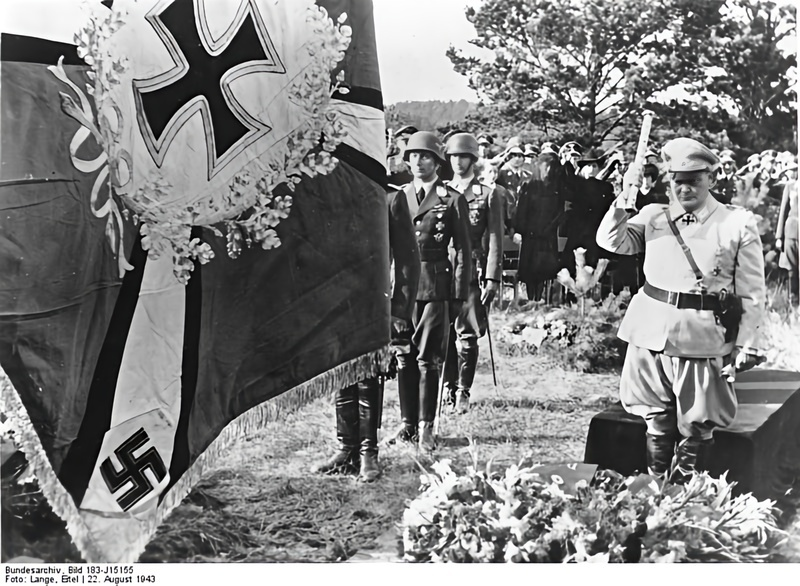
Hermann Göring at Jeschonnek's funeral

That night, Bomber Command carried out Operation Hydra (1943), against facilities at Peenemünde on the night of 17–18 August 1943. The defences failed, and in the confusion around 100 night fighters were sent to Berlin, in the belief this was the target. Bomber Command sent out diversionary raids in the direction of the capital confusing matters further. Anti-aircraft defences mistook the large number of fighters for intruders and opened fire. Twelve night fighters were lost—nine of them in action with British bombers and night fighter intruders.

Meister reported the results to Jeschonnek in the morning; Jeschonnek received it quietly. Meister then departed for a conference at which Jeschonnek did not appear. Jeschonnek's adjutant was holding breakfast for him, and another officer also wished to make a report to him directly. A secretary called Jeschonnek's office; he answered and promised to come immediately. When Jeschonnek failed to arrive his adjutant went to look for him, but found him dead with a pistol at his side. According to the adjutant, he did not hear the shot, despite being only 10 metres (33 ft) from Jeschonnek's office. A note was found which read, "I can no longer work together with the Reichsmarschall. Long live the Führer!" A second note was found nearby, excluding Ulrich Diesing and Bernd von Brauchitsch from the funeral. Jeschonnek left behind a memorandum, addressed ostensibly to Hitler, in which he called for a change in leadership of the Luftwaffe. Göring confiscated the memo, convinced that Jeschonnek had been working against him.

Historian Richard Suchenwirth wrote that after World War I there emerged two schools of officer; the cautious, who feared a conflict involving Germany would only bring a powerful coalition against them, and the optimists who believed the stab-in-the back legend, and the invincibility of German arms.

Jeschonnek belonged to the circle which believed in a great and victorious future. His feelings were intensified by his personal devotion to Hitler, whom he saw as a genius of first rank. But in Jeschonnek there was nothing of the demonic which might have made him impervious to the vicissitudes of war or reason. Instead, he had an alert, acute mind which eventually led him to recognize the real truth beneath events, and to see that Hitler, and he along with Hitler, had been wrong. Victory was no longer to be achieved and defeat was certain. With this realization the strength of his personality was shattered. Moreover, there were the threats which menaced his position, and the problem of Göring. Patriotic, sensitive, ambitious, and naturally optimistic, Jeschonnek finally anticipated the approaching calamity. Suicide for him was the only proper way to preserve the hard and unshakable mask of the soldier. Far more lonely than hundreds of thousands of his comrades-in-arms, he died as he had lived, a child of his times.

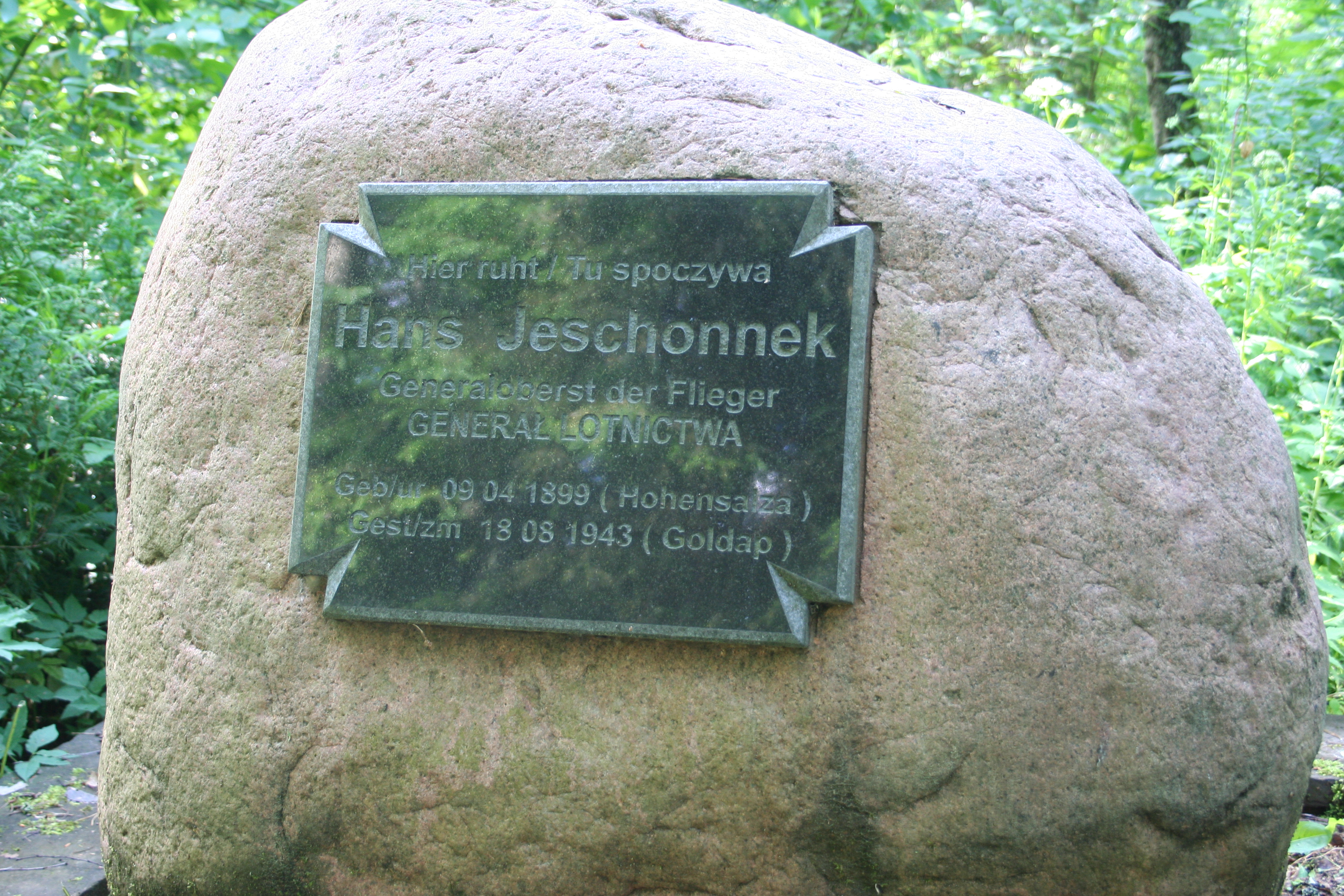
Grave in Goldap

Göring changed the date of Jeschonnek's death to 19 August in attempt to erase the connection with Peenemunde. This date was reported in the Völkischer Beobachter newspaper. It was in the interests of the Nazi leadership to hide the manner of Jeschonnek's demise, to prevent the Allies and German public from drawing any conclusions from it. Jeschonnek was buried, at his own request, in Camp Robinson on the shores of Lake Goldap, not far from the Rominter Heath (now in Poland). His resting place is still actively maintained by the German War Graves Commission, and there is a memorial stone with a plaque inscribed in both German and Polish.

After his death, he was replaced by General der Flieger Günther Korten and, simultaneously, Oberst Eckhard Christian was moved to Luftwaffe-Führungstab (staff for the direction of air operations). One year after, on 1 September 1944, the latter was promoted to Generalmajor and chief of the Luftwaffe-Führungstab at Hitler's request.

== Promotions ==
- 10 August 1914 Fähnrich (Officer Cadet)
- 26 September 1914 Leutnant (2nd Lieutenant) without Patent
  - 16 April 1918 received Patent from 9 April 1916
  - 1 July 1922 received Reichswehr Rank Seniority (RDA) from 9 April 1916
- 31 July 1925 Oberleutnant (1st Lieutenant) with effect and RDA from 1 April 1925 (386)
- 30 May 1932 Hauptmann (Captain) with effect and RDA from 1 June 1932 (1)
- 1 April 1935 Major (7)
- 20 April 1937 Oberstleutnant (Lieutenant Colonel) with effect and RDA from 1 April 1937 (19)
- 30 October 1938 Oberst (Colonel) with effect and RDA from 1 November 1938 (1)
  - 24 February 1939 received new and improved RDA from 1 August 1938 (1a)
- 14 August 1939 Generalmajor (Major General) with effect and RDA from 1 August 1939 (5)
- 19 July 1940 General der Flieger (5)
  - promoted with immediate effect for "outstanding service in leading the Luftwaffe General Staff," he thus bypassed the rank of Lieutenant General.
- 8 March 1942 Generaloberst with effect and RDA from 1 March 1942

== Awards and decorations ==
- Kingdom of Prussia: Iron Cross 2nd Class (14 October 1915) and 1st Class (23 October 1918)
- Kingdom of Prussia: Military Pilot Badge (30 June 1918)
- German Empire: Honor Goblet for the Victor in Air Combat (9 July 1918)
- German Empire: Wound Badge in Black (17 August 1918)
- Germany: Combined Pilot/Observer Badge (2 August 1935)
- Germany: Wehrmacht Long Service Award, 2nd to 4th Class (2 October 1936)
- Germany: Wehrmacht Long Service Award, 1st Class (10 August 1939)
- Germany: Anschluss Medal (21 November 1938)
- Germany: Sudetenland Medal with Prague Castle bar (22 May 1939)
- Germany: Memel Medal (19 September 1939)
- Germany: 1939 Clasp to the Iron Cross 2nd Class (21 September 1939) and 1st Class (26 September 1939)
- Germany: Knight's Cross of the Iron Cross on 27 October 1939 as Generalmajor and chief of the general staff of the Luftwaffe
- Kingdom of Bulgaria: Order of Military Merit, Grand Cross with War Decoration (1941)
- Finland: Order of the Cross of Liberty, 1st Class with Swords (25 March 1942)
- Kingdom of Hungary: Order of Merit, Officer (4 November 1938)
- Kingdom of Italy: Order of the Crown of Italy, Commander (15 September 1940)
- Kingdom of Romania: Order of Michael the Brave, 3rd Class (7 November 1941)
- Kingdom of Romania: Order of Michael the Brave, 2nd Class (1 September 1942)
- Kingdom of Romania: Order of the Star of Romania, Grand Cross with Swords on the Ribbon for Military Virtue (14 October 1941)
- Kingdom of Yugoslavia: Order of St. Sava, 2nd Class (2 June 1939)

== See also ==
- Fliegerführer Irak

== Notes ==
Military offices
| Preceded by none | Geschwaderkommodore of Lehrgeschwader 1; 1 October 1936 – November 1936 | Succeeded by Oberst Dr. Robert Knauss |
| Preceded by none | Commander of Fliegerführer Irak; 6 May 1941 – 29 May 1941 | Succeeded by none |
| Preceded by General der Flieger Hans-Jürgen Stumpff | Chief of the Luftwaffe General Staff; 1 February 1939 – 19 August 1943 | Succeeded by General der Flieger Günther Korten |
