= Hans-Georg von Seidel =

German military leader

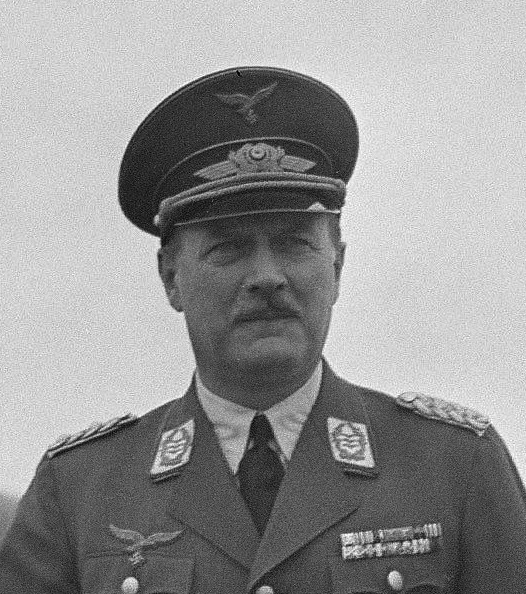
- General der Flieger von Seidel
- Born: 11 November 1894; Diedersdorf Estate, Landkreis Lebus, Province of Brandenburg, Kingdom of Prussia, German Empire
- Died: 10 November 1955 (aged 63); Bad Godesberg near Bonn, North Rhine-Westphalia, West Germany
- Military career
- Allegiance: German Empire (to 1918); Nazi Germany
- Branch: Imperial German Army; Luftwaffe
- Service years: 1910–1920; 1934–1945
- Rank: Rittmeister; General der Flieger
- Commands: Aufklärungsgruppe 12 (Reconnaissance Group 12) Military Airfield Commandant Stargard-Klützow; Quartermaster General of the Luftwaffe Luftflotte 10 (Air Fleet 10)
- Conflicts: World War I World War II
- Awards: Iron Cross; Knight's Cross of the War Merit Cross

Ludwig Karl Hans-Georg Seidel, as of 1909 von Seidel (11 November 1891 – 10 November 1955), was a German officer who served in the German Army during World War I and in the Luftwaffe (German Air Force) during World War II. Von Seidel was promoted to the rank of General der Flieger (General of the Aviators).

General von Seidel served for most of World War II as the head of German Air Force organization, armament, maintenance, and supply. He was a practical realist who distanced himself from his idealist boss Hans Jeschonnek, Luftwaffe Chief of Staff, an unquestioning follower of Adolf Hitler. Von Seidel attempted to implement the expansive German war plans but suffered from heavy combat losses of materiel and men. After the war, von Seidel was chosen leader of the high-ranking prisoners of war at Island Farm.

== Life ==
Hans-Georg von Seidel was born at his father's estate in the farming village of Diedersdorf in the county of Lebus, a rural district in the Province of Brandenburg, Kingdom of Prussia, on 11 November 1891. Seidel joined the cavalry of the Prussian Army on 18 March 1910, served with the 1st Life Hussar Regiment, was promoted to the rank of 2nd lieutenant in 1911 and transferred to the Hussar Regiment “Emperor Nicholas II of Russia” (1st Westphalian) No. 8 on 1 October 1913. He served as an officer in the German Army during World War I, and left the service in 1920 as a captain of cavalry.

He managed his father's estate and served as chairman of the district equestrian association and of the Königsberg-Lebus agricultural cooperative in Frankfurt an der Oder. During this period, he was also a local group and company leader in the Stahlhelmbund, as well as an SA-Sturmbannführer in the mounted SA (Reiter-SA). From his father's estates he inherited in 1933 the 368 hectare Ober-Görsdorf estate, grouped together as a town in Görsdorf, near Diedersdorf. The estate was later maintained by a estate manager.

On 1 May 1934, von Seidel returned to military service: this time in the Air Ministry with a promotion to major. Not yet a pilot, Seidel was detached in August 1935 to the flying school at Braunschweig to take the aerial observer course and the pilot course. He then attended the Kampffliegerschule (bomber flying school) at Jüterbog where he learned to fly multi-engine aircraft. At the end of 1935, Seidel was posted to the General Staff of the German Air Force at the Air Ministry where he served as a department chief, and was promoted to lieutenant colonel on 20 April 1936.

In March 1937, Seidel accepted the command of an air group, Aufklärungsgruppe 12 (Reconnaissance Group 12) and was simultaneously given command of the group's airfield at Stargard-Klützow.

=== World War II ===
Hans Jeschonnek, left, and Hans-Georg von Seidel in 1943

On 16 April 1938 Seidel was named Generalquartiermeister der Luftwaffe, the top staff officer in charge of supply and administration for the German Air Force, a position he held for the next six years. He served under Hans Jeschonnek, an ardent Nazi and an airman prone to making significant strategic mistakes, such as opposing the production of four-engine bombers in favor of dive bombers. To Jeschonnek, the Quartermaster General should have been his second-most important assistant after the Chief of Operations, but Jeschonnek suffered a cold relationship with Seidel. The two men worked hundreds of kilometres apart, with no contact for months on end, though their plans were intimately tied. On five occasions, Seidel requested a transfer and was refused each time. Seidel tried to keep the Luftwaffe supply lines from breaking, but Hitler's ideas and Jeschonnek's plans were too difficult to counter. Seidel agreed with top airman Hermann Göring and influential General Erhard Milch that their leader was a negative factor in air planning. After the war, Seidel said, "Hitler understood nothing about flying and cared less."

In 1939, Seidel formed two Flugzeug-Überführungsgruppen (aircraft ferry groups) to streamline the delivery of new aircraft to combat air groups. Prior to this the aircraft were sometimes flown to combat groups by airmen posted to the Supply and Procurement Groups, and sometimes were picked up by combat fliers with a resulting disruption to manpower availability at the front.

When Germany invaded Poland on 1 September 1939, the Luftwaffe was worked hard, and the supply chain was stretched taut. Before the attack, aviation gas reserves were at 400,000 tonnes and Seidel, promoted to major general the day the war started, demanded that they be increased to 600,000 tonnes, a six-month supply, before offensive operations were begun. His numbers "were ridiculed as 'exaggerated'." The expenditure of aerial munitions in the operation went beyond expectations, taking some 3,000 tonnes, a third of the total stock of explosives. Many aircraft were lost to Polish anti-aircraft fire, and some from fighter aircraft opposition and operational accidents. Seidel reported that as of 28 September 1939, 285 aircraft were lost to all causes, while 279 additional aircraft were damaged more than ten per cent and required major repairs. Aircrew losses were 189 dead, 126 wounded, and 224 missing, with 195 more casualties among Luftwaffe ground personnel and Fliegerabwehrkanone (flak) units.

Seidel saw that aircraft testing areas were needed behind front lines, so that newly delivered aircraft could be assessed and given minor field modifications appropriate to their employment in battle. He established such testing areas, and also used them for final assembly of any light aircraft shipped by rail.

In autumn 1940, Seidel was informed by Hermann Göring, leader of the Luftwaffe, of Adolf Hitler's plan to invade the Soviet Union the next summer. Along with other top air officers, Seidel was astonished at the idea and doubtful of success. He warned Göring that the Luftwaffe could not possibly cope with this demand. Göring insisted that there was no alternative, that he had already tried to change Hitler's mind.

==== Mannerheim's birthday ====
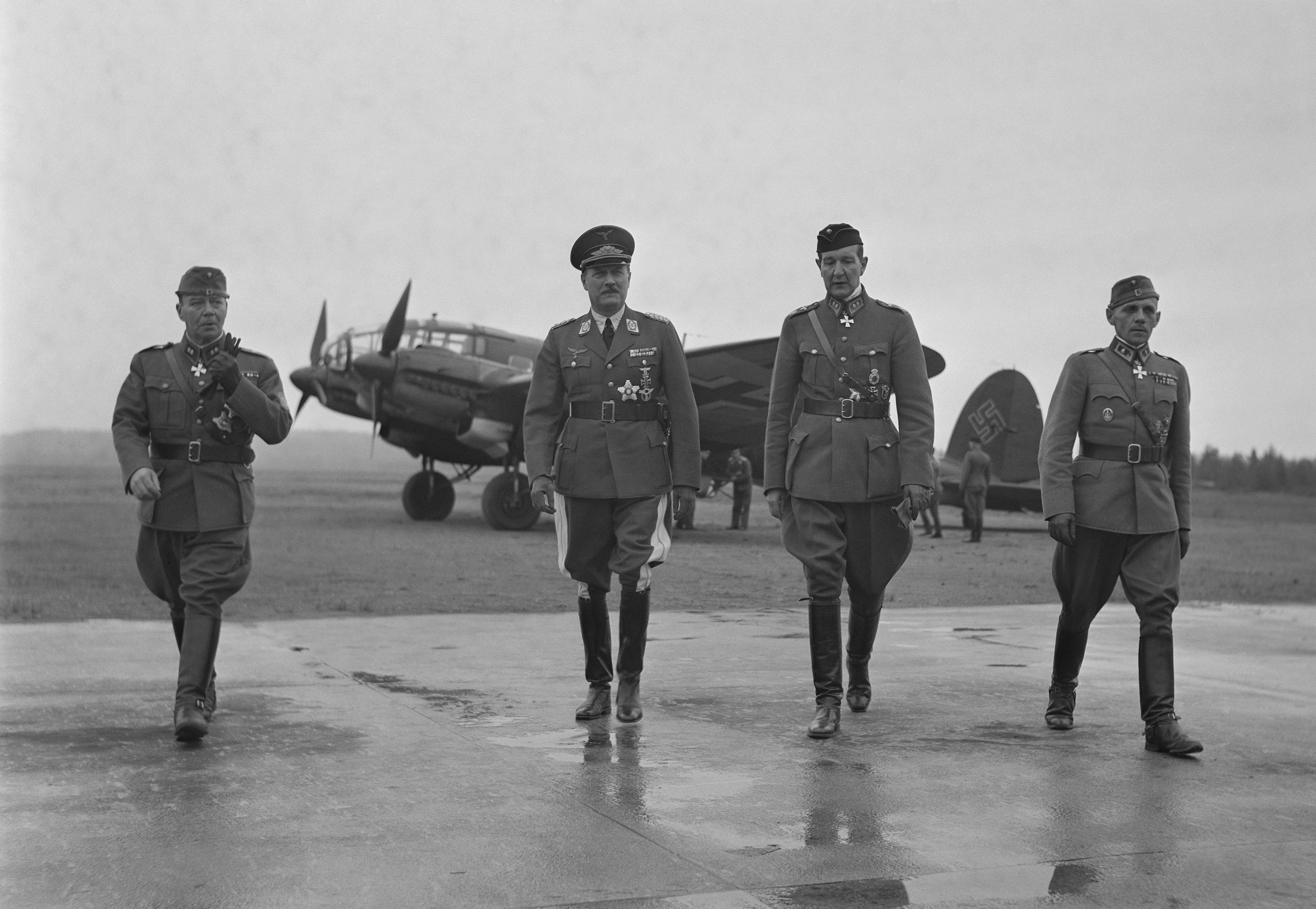
Seidel joined Adolf Hitler in Finland to see Mannerheim. He's the second person from the left in this image.

Upon the occasion of the 75th birthday of the Marshal of Finland, Baron Carl Gustaf Emil Mannerheim, Hitler flew to Finland to visit him. On the morning of 4 June 1942 at Immola airfield near Imatra, Seidel was the first German general to arrive, followed within a few hours by Generaloberst Hans-Jürgen Stumpff, Generaloberst Eduard Dietl, and then Feldmarschall Wilhelm Keitel who accompanied Hitler. Finnish and German officers reviewed troops in the airfield, then the officers met in a rail car for a few hours. The visiting Germans flew out in the evening.

==== Eastern Front ====
For the 800,000 Luftwaffe personnel on the Eastern Front, Seidel was able to work with Milch to secure extra woollen underwear, fur boots, and other winter wear. However, beginning in October 1942 during the Battle of Stalingrad, Seidel sought desperately to find enough aircraft to supply the surrounded Sixth Army by air–the Junkers Ju 52 transports of Luftflotte 4 (Air Fleet 4) were not sufficient, and Hitler had ordered the army to stand and fight. On 23 November, Seidel ordered all German ministry, training, and staff aircraft of any size to join the airlift into Stalingrad. Some 600 aircraft flown by highly skilled instructors were taken from training facilities and sent east, with the result that some specialized training schools were closed. Aircraft as various as Heinkel He 111 bombers, Focke-Wulf Fw 200 Condor reconnaissance patrol bombers, Junkers Ju 90 airliners, and Junkers Ju 86 trainers were pressed into airlift service. Many that arrived at eastern air bases were pushed aside as useless until they could be winterized. By 19 December, the collection of aircraft were at their peak of delivery, with 289 tonnes of supplies dropped in 154 sorties on that day. The Sixth Army needed 700–800 tonnes each day, with food and munitions as top priority, but they received only a fraction of that, and some deliveries such as spices and summer clothing were completely useless to the troops. Severe winter conditions and unrelenting Soviet attacks took a heavy toll of the ground and air forces. Some 488 aircraft were lost along with some 1,000 of the Luftwaffe's finest airmen. Seidel noted the great equipment losses in that theatre: "Of 100,000 Luftwaffe vehicles in the East, only 15 per cent still functioning early in January 1942." The aircraft evacuated 42,000 men, mostly wounded, with the last one flown out on 24 January 1943. The Sixth Army surrendered on 3 February.

Hitler blamed Göring for the disaster in East, after which Göring announced that he would court-martial Jeschonnek and Seidel for causing the failure of the Stalingrad airlift. Hitler forbade this action as he believed that the two men were not at fault.

From July 1944 to February 1945, von Seidel served in Berlin as commander of Luftflotte 10 (Air Fleet 10), a training and replacement organization. Late in February, he was named leader of the Reserve Luftwaffe High Command, a position he was to hold for a few months until the end of the war.

=== Post-war ===
Von Seidel was taken prisoner of war on 6 May 1945 at Oberaudorf by American troops. On 17 May he was transferred to British supervision. On 9 January 1946, Seidel was taken to Island Farm where he became the leader of the prisoners at Special Camp 11. In that role he worked with Rear Admiral Hans Voss who was liaison to the British authorities.

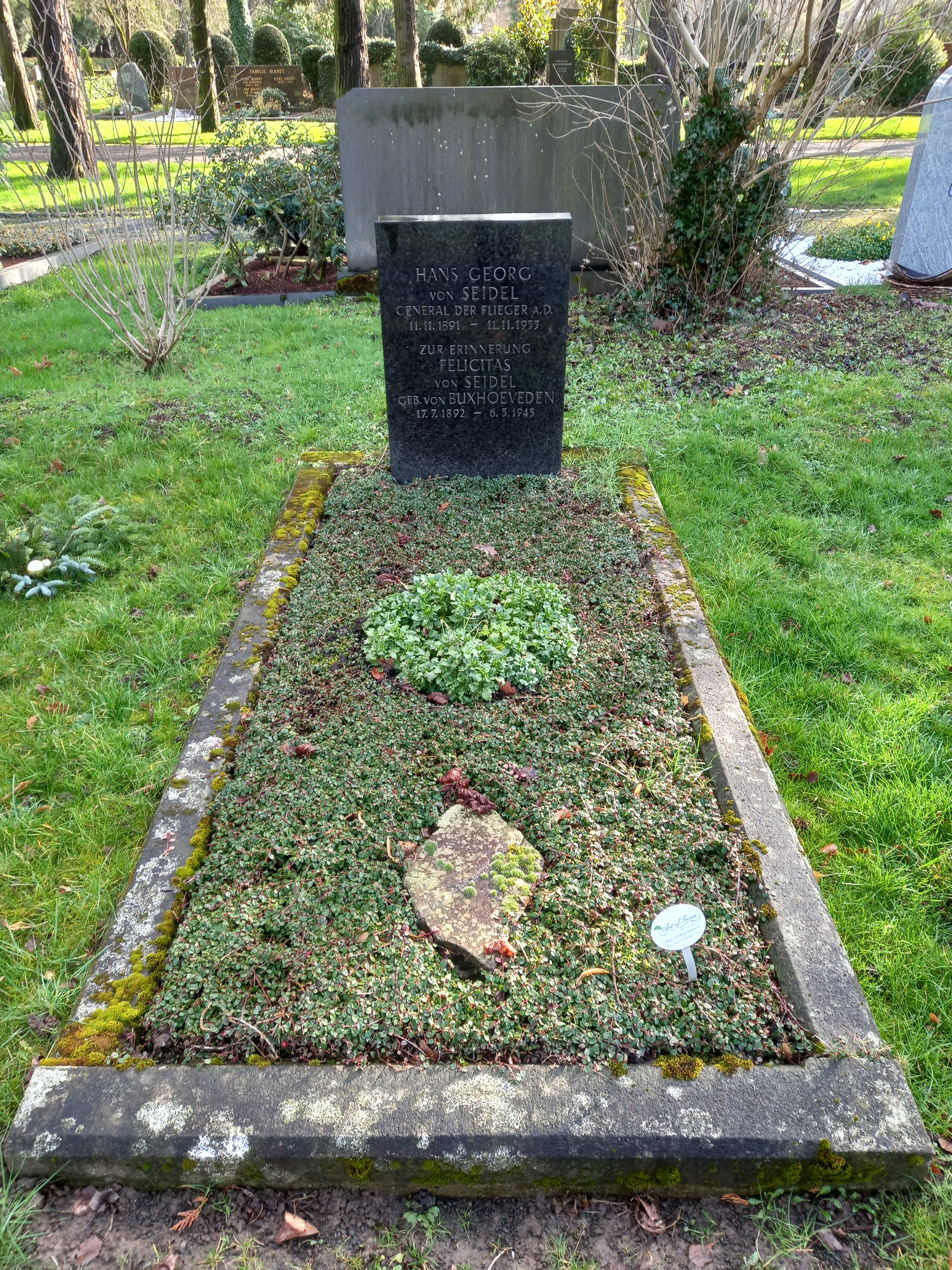
The grave of General Hans-Georg von Seidel in the Bad Godesberg Central Cemetery in Bonn.

Von Seidel headed a group of German officers who ranked above him, ones charged with war crimes or being held as witnesses, including Field Marshals Gerd von Rundstedt, Erich von Manstein, Paul Ludwig Ewald von Kleist, and Walter von Brauchitsch. He was interviewed for his views on the war, and gave his opinion that the invasion of Germany would have failed except for Allied air power disrupting German supply lines. He said that this was "the decisive factor..." On 12 May 1948 after three years of imprisonment, Seidel began the process of repatriation.

In 1949, von Seidel gave a lecture about how the supply of aviation fuel was a major factor in the war. In the early 1950s, he corresponded with authors seeking further information about the war.

== Death ==
General (Ret.) Hans-Georg von Seidel died in Bad Godesberg on 10 November 1955. A Bundeswehr barracks at Trier was named in his honor in 1965: General-von-Seidel-Kaserne (General von Seidel Barracks).

== Family ==
His parents were the manufacturer, district deputy, and lord of the manor (Rittergut Diedersdorf, family-owned from 1872 to 1945) 2nd Lieutenant (Ret.) Johann Max Ludwig von Seidel (1851–1933)—who was ennobled on 27 January 1909—and his wife Berta Margarete, née Veit (b. 6 January 1861), both of whom were from Berlin. He had three older siblings.

=== Marriage ===
On 16 May 1919 in Berlin, Captain von Seidel married his fiancée Felicitas "Fairy" Eugenie Cäcilie Mathilde, widowed Baroness von Schilling, née Baroness von Buxhoeveden (b. 17 July 1892 in Gostilizy near Peterhof), daughter of Baltic German Provincial Marshal (Landmarschall) Alexander "Axel" Peter Eduard Baron von Buxhoeveden (b. 21 April 1856 in Arensburg; murdered 16 February 1919 at Kuiwast Estate, Estonia), jurist, civil servant, later Chief Court Huntsman and Chamberlain at the court of the Russian Emperor in St. Petersburg as well as Knight of Justice (Rechtsritter) of the Johanniter-Orden and lord of the manor (Gut Kuiwast), and his wife (∞ 11 April 1887) Charlotte Mathilde Sophie, née von Siemens (1858–1926). They would have two children of their own:

- Hans-Georg Ludwig Alexander (b. 20 February 1920 in Berlin-Charlottenburg; d. 2010), Wehrmacht officer; ∞ 1951 Waltraut von Bülow (1924–2014), 4 children
- Hans-Georg Joachim Horst (b. 18 July 1923 in Berlin; d. 11 June 2018 in Hamburg); ∞ Amelie Scholz-Forni (a granddaughter of the well-known Hamburg shipowner Martin Garlieb Amsinck)
  - After his service with the heavy railway anti-aircraft artillery and the end of the war, Horst pursued a career in the business world. He rose to become the general representative of the renowned banking firm Merck, Finck & Co. in Munich. Like his brother Alexander, he was a Knight of Justice of the Protestant Order of Saint John (Brandenburg Provincial Chapter) and remained active in the field of foundations well into his later years (serving, among other roles, on the board of the Hans-Rudolf-Stiftung in Munich).

Felicitas von Seidel died on 6 May 1945 in Oschatz, Saxony; the exact circumstances of her death are not clearly documented in historical records. The Americans had occupied the city without a fight in April 1945. On 5 May 1945, they handed the city over to the Russians. By 6 May 1945, they had left the city. Given that she died in Saxony one day after the Red Army entered the city—an event accompanied by mass murder and mass rapes—it is more than likely that her death was connected to this. Whether this was her fate or whether she chose suicide remains unknown. Her husband became a US prisoner of war in Oberaudorf (Bavaria) and was unable to support her in Saxony. A memorial plaque in her honor is located on the elaborate tomb of her mother, Charlotte, at the main cemetery in Baden-Baden. Her name also appears on her husband's gravestone in Bad Godesberg, "in memory" of his wife.

== Commands and assignments ==
- 18 March 1910 – 30 September 1913: Fahnenjunker and squadron officer in 1. Leib-Husaren-Regiment Nr.1.
- 1 October 1913 – 2 August 1917: Squadron officer and squadron commander in Husaren-Regiment Kaiser Nikolaus II von Rußland (1. Westfälisches ) Nr.8.
- 3 August – 31 October 1917: Ordnance officer on the staff of 77th Reserve Division.
- 1 November 1917 – 30 June 1918: Chief Supply Officer (Ib) on the staff of 2nd Infantry Division.
- 1 July – 13 December 1918: Chief Supply Officer (Ib) on the General Staff of the Landwehr Corps.
- 14 December 1918 – 11 August 1919: Consultant in the Operations Department of the Army High Command, General Staff of the Field Army and General Staff of the Army.
- 12 August – 25 September 1919: Transferred to the Kommandostelle of the General Staff of the Army in Kolberg.
- 26 September – 27 November 1919: Transferred to the Abwicklungsstelle of the General Staff of the Army.
- 28 November 1919 – 26 April 1920: Consultant in the Army Command/Reich War Ministry.
- 26 April 1920: Separated from the Army.
- 1 May 1934: Returned to military service with the Luftwaffe.
- 1 May 1934 – 30 November 1935: Consultant in the Air Command Department, Reich Air Ministry.
- 18 August – 11 October 1935: Detached to aerial observer course at the Flying School Braunschweig and at the Kampffliegerschule (Bomber Flying School) Jüterbog.
- 1 December 1935 – 28 February 1937: Department Chief in the General Staff of the Luftwaffe, Reich Air Ministry.
- 1 March 1937 – 15 April 1938: Commander of Aufklärungsgruppe 12 (Reconnaissance Group 12) and, at the same time, Military Airfield Commandant Stargard-Klützow.
- 16 April 1938 – 30 June 1944: Quartermaster General of the Luftwaffe.
- 1 July 1944 – 27 February 1945: Commander-in-Chief of Luftflotte 10 (Air Fleet 10).
- 27 February – 6 May 1945: Führer Reserve Luftwaffe High Command.
- 6–17 May 1945: Prisoner of war in American captivity.
- 17 May 1945 – 17 May 1948: Prisoner of war in British captivity.
  - 9 January 1946 transferred to Island Farm Special Camp 11
  - 12 May 1948 transferred to Camp 186 for repatriation.

== Promotions ==
- Fahnenjunker: 18 March 1910
- Fahnenjunker-Unteroffizier: 5 August 1910
- Fähnrich: 16 November 1910
- Leutnant: 18 August 1911 with Patent from 20 August 1909
- Oberleutnant: 18 August 1915
- Rittmeister: 18 August 1918
  - 21 August 1918 renamed Hauptmann i. G. (Captain in General Staff)
- Major i. G.: 1 May 1934
- Oberstleutnant i. G.: 20 April 1936 with effect and Rank Seniority (RDA) from 1 April 1936 (3)
- Oberst i. G.: 27 July 1938 with effect and RDA from 1 August 1938
- Generalmajor: 22 September 1939 with effect and RDA from 1 September 1939
- Generalleutnant: 19 July 1940
- General der Flieger: 1 January 1942

== Awards and decorations ==
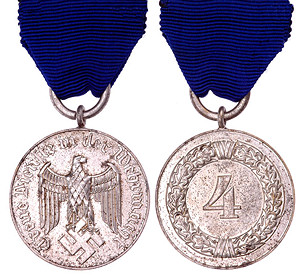
Long Service Award, 4th Class

- Iron Cross of 1914, 1st and 2nd class
  - 2nd Class on 25 September 1914
  - 1st Class on 10 October 1915
- Princely Schaumburg-Lippe Cross for Faithful Service (SLK) on 7 July 1917
- Knight of Honour (Ehrenritter) of the Order of Saint John in 1931
  - together with his older brother Major der Landwehr Ludwig Rudolf Hans-Joachim von Seidel-Diedersdorf
- Honour Cross of the World War 1914/1918 with Swords on 21 December 1934
- Hungarian World War Commemorative Medal with Swords
- Bulgarian War Commemorative Medal 1915–1918 with Swords
- Observer Badge (Luftwaffe) on 24 September 1935
- Wehrmacht Long Service Award, 4th and 3rd Class on 2 October 1936
- Order of the Crown of Italy, Grand Officer
- Sudetenland Medal with clasp "Prague Castle"
- Memel Medal
- Repetition Clasp 1939 to the Iron Cross 1914, 2nd and 1st Class
- War Merit Cross, 2nd and 1st Class with Swords
- Combined Pilots-Observation Badge in Gold with Diamonds
- Order of the White Rose of Finland, Grand Cross on 19 February 1941
- Imperial Order of the Yoke and Arrows, Grand Cross on 12 May 1941
- Order of the Star of Romania, Grand Officer with Swords on 23 December 1941 (Royal Decree No. 3517)
- Order of Military Merit (Bulgaria), class unknown (most likely Grand Cross with War Decoration)
- Crusade Against Communism Medal
- Finnish Order of the Cross of Liberty, 1st Class with Oakleaves and Swords on 31 March 1943
- Knight's Cross of the War Merit Cross with Swords as General der Flieger and Quartermaster General of the Luftwaffe on 20 July 1944

== Sources ==
- German Federal Archives: BArch PERS 6/325 and PERS 6/13163
