= Gustav Kastner-Kirdorf =

German Luftwaffe general (1881–1945)

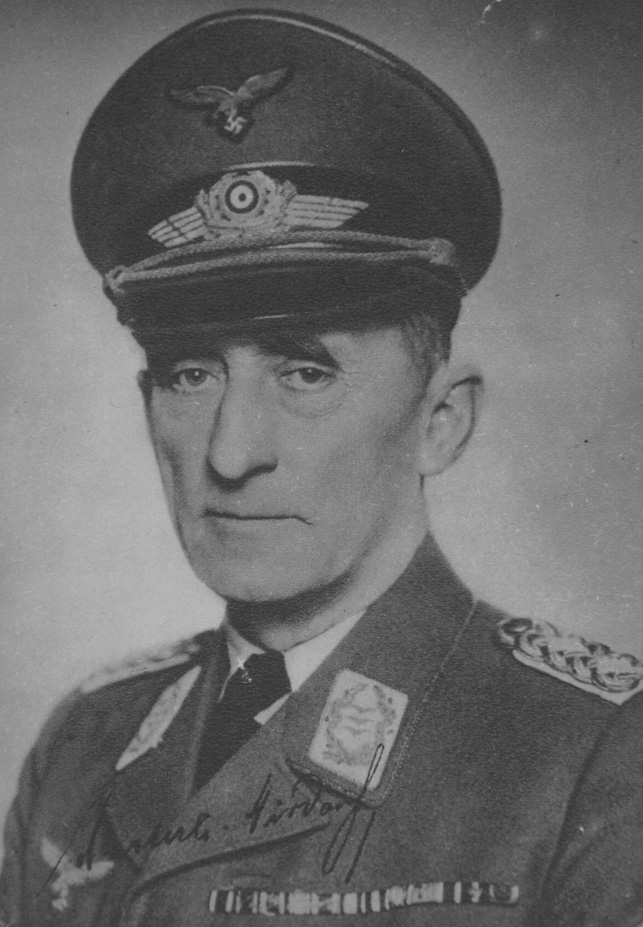
- Kastner-Kirdorf c. 1941–1945

Chief of the Luftwaffe Enforcement and Clemency Office
- In office 15 April 1943 – 4 May 1945

Chief of the Luftwaffe Personnel Office
- In office 31 January 1939 – 23 March 1943
- Preceded by: Robert Ritter von Greim
- Succeeded by: Bruno Loerzer

Personal details
- Born: Gustav Kastner; 2 February 1881 Trumpfsee-Warnitz, Kingdom of Prussia, German Empire
- Died: 4 May 1945 (aged 64) Berchtesgaden, Bavaria, Nazi Germany
- Cause of death: Suicide
- Resting place: Kriegsgräberstätte, (Schönau am Königssee, Germany
- Spouse: Adele Kirdorf

Military service
- Allegiance: German Empire; Nazi Germany
- Branch/service: Luftstreitkräfte; Luftwaffe
- Years of service: 1904–1919; 1935–1945
- Rank: Major (brevet); General der Flieger
- Battles/wars: World War I World War II
- Awards: German Cross, in silver Iron Cross, 1st and 2nd class War Merit Cross, 1st and 2nd class, with swords

Gustav Kastner-Kirdorf (2 February 1881 – 4 May 1945) was a German professional military officer who served in the Royal Prussian Army and, after training as a pilot, fought in the First World War in the Luftstreitkräfte in both command and staff positions. During the interwar years, he helped to establish Luftwaffe in violation of the terms of the Versailles Treaty and served as the head of its personnel office from 1939 to 1943. He attained the rank of General der Flieger during the Second World War and died by suicide in the closing days of the war.

== Early life ==
Gustav Kastner was born in Trumpfsee-Warnitz in the Prussian province of Brandenburg. In 1899 he became a member of the German student corps Hevellia Berlin. Kastner enlisted in the Royal Prussian Army with Infantry Regiment 25 (1st Rhenish) as a Fahnenjunker (officer cadet) on 5 February 1904, and he was commissioned as a Leutnant in November 1904. He served with this regiment until March 1914, as a company officer and as a battalion and a regimental adjutant. He then transferred to Infantry Regiment 17 (4th Westphalian) from March to August 1914, completing pilot training in July.

== First World War ==
With the outbreak of the First World War, Kastner served from August to September 1914 as a general staff officer and commander of the aviation detachment of the XIV Army Corps. He then served as a pilot and observer in Field Aviation Detachment 39 from September to November 1914. Next posted to the carrier pigeon detachment in Ostend, he became its commander from February to April 1915. He then served as commander of Field Aviation Detachment 62 until August 1915 when he was promoted to commander of Combat Squadron 2. In August 1916, he relinquished this command and joined the staff of the air force commander of the 1st Army. On 1 December 1916, Kastner was made a department head on the staff of the commanding general of the Luftstreitkräfte, holding this position until January 1919. During the war, he was awarded the Iron Cross, 1st and 2nd class. After his September 1917 marriage to Adele Kirdorf, the daughter of the mining industrialist Adolph Kirdorf, he changed his surname to Kastner-Kirdorf at the request of his father-in-law. He became the commander of the air base at Neuruppin in January 1919 but left military service on 8 June with the brevet rank of Major.

== Reichswehr ==
On 1 August 1927, Kastner-Kirdorf was hired as a civilian employee of the Reichswehr. Since the existence of a German air force was banned by the terms of the Versailles Treaty, he engaged in secret aviation training in the Soviet Union until September 1930. After his return to Germany, he was appointed head of the advertising department of the German Air Sports Association on 1 October 1930, a position he held until the end of March 1934. This organization functioned as a covert means of developing military aviation by provided training for future air force pilots and personnel under the guise of civilian aviation activities.

== Luftwaffe and the Second World War ==
On 1 April 1934, Kastner-Kirdorf was appointed as the leader of the flight readiness unit in the Reich Ministry of Aviation (RLM), where he worked on establishing the Luftwaffe. During this time, he also served as air base commander at Staaken on the outskirts of Berlin, from July 1934 to the end of June 1938. From July to October 1938, Kastner-Kirdorf was commander of Flight School 3 before being appointed Higher Air Training Commander III through the end of 1938. He returned to the RLM where he remained throughout the entirety of the Second World War, being appointed as the Chief of the Luftwaffe Personnel Office on 31 January 1939. Promoted to General der Flieger on 1 July 1941, he remained head of personnel through 23 March 1943. On 15 April 1943, he was made Chief of the Luftwaffe Office for Enforcement and Clemency Matters, holding this position until his death in the closing days of the war.

== Death ==
On 4 May 1945, Kastner-Kirdorf committed suicide by shooting himself in the head. In his book, Beyond Band of Brothers: The War Memoirs of Major Dick Winters, Richard Winters recounts finding Kastner-Kirdorf's body with a Luger pistol still in his hand in Hermann Göring's private compound at Berchtesgaden. A photo of his corpse was taken by American photographer Lee Miller.

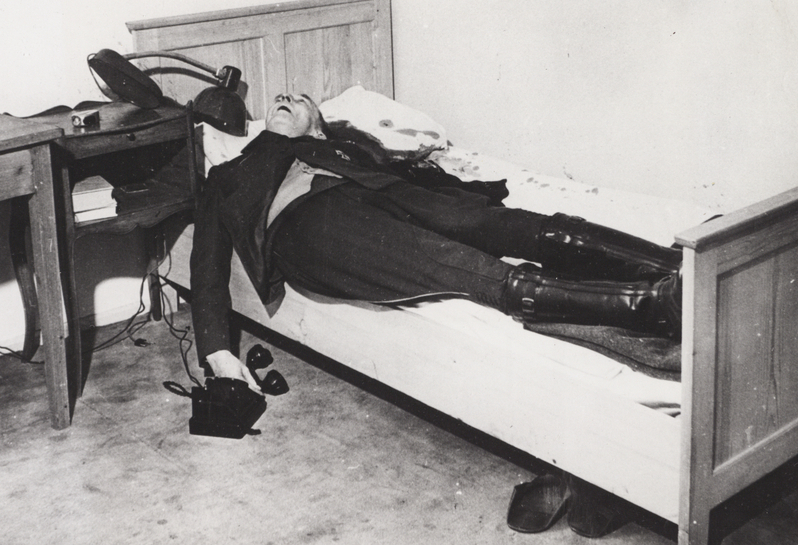
Gustav Kastner-Kirdorf's suicide

== Dates of rank ==
Dates of rank
Date	Rank
19 February 1904	Gefreiter
30 May 1904	Unteroffizier
15 September 1904	Fähnrich
15 November 1904	Leutnant
19 November 1911	Oberleutnant
28 November 1914	Hauptmann
20 October 1919	Major (brevet)
1 April 1934	Oberstleutnant
1 October 1935	Oberst
1 June 1938	Generalmajor
1 January 1940	Generalleutnant
1 July 1941	General der Flieger

== Sources ==
- Dermot Bradley (Ed.), Karl Friedrich Hildebrand: Die Generale der deutschen Luftwaffe 1935–1945. Die militärischen Werdegänge der Generale, sowie der Ärzte, Veterinäre, Intendanten, Richter und Ministerialbeamten im Generalsrang. Band 2: Habermehl–Nuber. Biblio Verlag, Osnabrück 1991, ISBN 3-7648-1701-1, pp. 153–154.
- Helge Dvorak: Biographisches Lexikon der Deutschen Burschenschaft. Band I: Politiker, Teilband 7: Supplement A–K, Winter, Heidelberg 2013, ISBN 978-3-8253-6050-4. pp. 527–528.
- Kastner-Kirdorf, Gustav in the World War II Graves website
- Webb, James Jack (2024). Generals and Admirals of the Third Reich: For Country or Fuehrer. Vol. 2: H–O. Havertown, PA: Casemate Publishers. ISBN 978-1-952-71517-4.
- Winters, Dick (2008). Beyond Band of Brothers: The War Memoirs of Major Dick Winters. New York: Dutton Caliber. ISBN 978-0-425-21375-9.

Military offices
Preceded by Robert Ritter von Greim	Chief of the Luftwaffe Personnel Office; 31 January 1939 – 23 March 1943	Succeeded by Bruno Loerzer
