= Chief of the Kriegsmarine Personnel Office =

- Chef des Marinepersonalamt
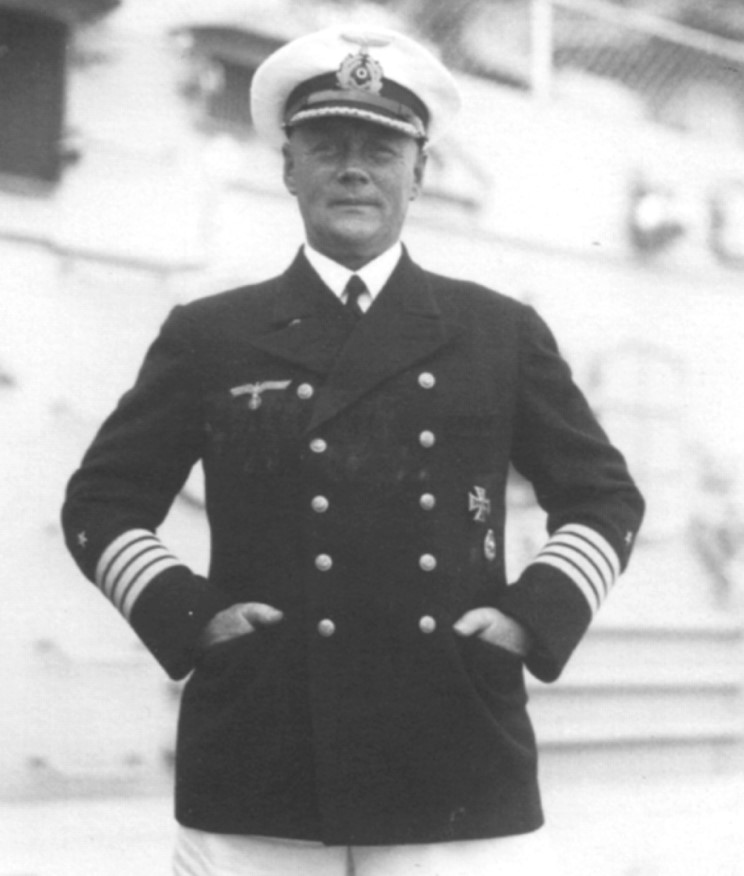
- Longest serving Admiral Conrad Patzig; 3 October 1937 – 31 October 1942
- Kriegsmarine
- Member of: Oberkommando der Kriegsmarine
- Reports to: Commander-in-chief of the Kriegsmarine
- Formation: 11 January 1936
- First holder: Günther Lütjens
- Final holder: Martin Baltzer
- Abolished: 14 July 1945

Chief of the Kriegsmarine Personnel Office (German: Chef des Marinepersonalamt) was a leading position within the German Kriegsmarine High Command in Nazi Germany.

== List of chiefs ==
No.	Picture	Chief	Took office	Left office	Time in office	Ref.
1	Günther Lütjens	Konteradmiral; Günther Lütjens (1889–1941)	11 January 1936	3 October 1937	1 year, 265 days	
2	Conrad Patzig	Admiral; Conrad Patzig (1888–1975)	3 October 1937	31 October 1942	5 years, 28 days	
3	Werner Ehrhardt [de]	Kapitän zur See; Werner Ehrhardt (1898–1967)	1 November 1942	5 January 1943	65 days	
4	Martin Baltzer [de]	Vizeadmiral; Martin Baltzer (1898–1971)	6 January 1943	14 July 1945	2 years, 189 days	

== See also ==
- Oberkommando der Kriegsmarine
- Army Personnel Office (Wehrmacht) (army equivalent)
- Chief of the Luftwaffe Personnel Office (air force equivalent)
