= Chief of the Luftwaffe Personnel Office =

- Chef des Luftwaffen-Personalamtes (German)

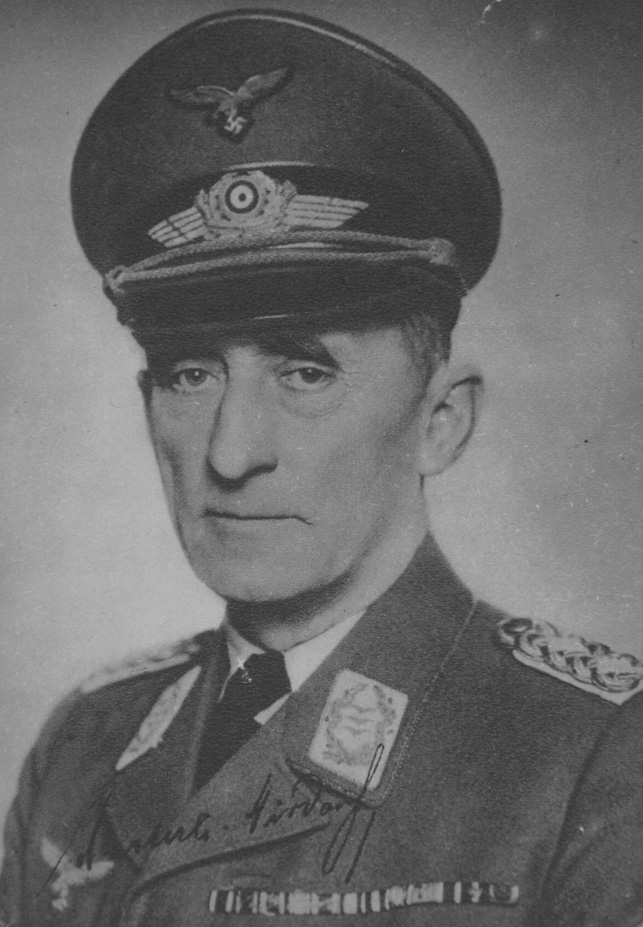
- Longest serving officeholder General der Flieger Gustav Kastner-Kirdorf; 31 January 1939 – 23 March 1943
- Luftwaffe
- Member of: Oberkommando der Luftwaffe
- Reports to: Commander-in-chief of the Luftwaffe
- Appointer: Commander-in-chief of the Luftwaffe
- Formation: 1 September 1933
- First holder: Hans-Jürgen Stumpff
- Final holder: Rudolf Meister
- Abolished: 8 May 1945

Chief of the Luftwaffe Personnel Office (German: Chef des Luftwaffen-Personalamtes) was a leading position within the German Luftwaffe High Command in Nazi Germany, charged with the personnel matters of all officers and cadets of the Luftwaffe.

== List of chiefs ==
No.	Picture	Chief	Took office	Left office	Time in office	Ref.
1	Hans-Jürgen Stumpff	Oberstleutnant; Hans-Jürgen Stumpff (1889–1968)	1 September 1933	31 May 1937	3 years, 272 days	
2	Robert Ritter von Greim	Generalmajor; Robert Ritter von Greim (1892–1945)	1 June 1937	31 January 1939	1 year, 244 days	
3	Gustav Kastner-Kirdorf	General der Flieger; Gustav Kastner-Kirdorf (1881–1945)	31 January 1939	23 March 1943	4 years, 51 days	
4	Bruno Loerzer	Generaloberst; Bruno Loerzer (1891–1960)	23 March 1943	22 December 1944	1 year, 274 days	
5	Rudolf Meister	General der Flieger; Rudolf Meister (1897–1958)	22 December 1944	8 May 1945	137 days	

== See also ==
- Oberkommando der Luftwaffe
- Inspector of Fighters
- Inspector of Bombers
- Army Personnel Office (Wehrmacht) (army equivalent)
- Chief of the Kriegsmarine Personnel Office (Navy equivalent)
