= Oberkommando der Luftwaffe =

High Command of the Luftwaffe of Nazi Germany

Air Force High Command
- Oberkommando der Luftwaffe
- Flag of the Supreme Commander of the Luftwaffe, 1938–1940
- Founded: 26 February 1935
- Disbanded: 23 May 1945
- Country: Nazi Germany
- Branch: Luftwaffe
- Part of: High Command of the Armed forces (Oberkommando der Wehrmacht)
- Headquarters: Present-day Henning von Tresckow Barracks, Potsdam
- Nickname: OKL

Commanders
- Commander-in-Chief: See list
- Chief of the General Staff: See list

The Oberkommando der Luftwaffe (lit. 'Upper Command of the Air Force'; abbreviated OKL) was the high command of the air force (Luftwaffe) of Nazi Germany.

== History ==
The Luftwaffe was organized in a large and diverse structure led by Reich minister and supreme commander of the Air force (German: Oberbefehlshaber der Luftwaffe) Hermann Göring. Through the Ministry of Aviation (Reichsluftfahrtministerium) Göring controlled all aspects of aviation in Germany, civilian and military alike. This organization was established in the peacetime period predating the German involvement in the Spanish Civil War.

In early 1937, Göring announced the reorganization of the Reich Air Ministry into military and civilian branches. The military branch was to be led by the Air Force High Command (Oberkommando der Luftwaffe) with its chief and general staff. However, the separation of military from civil aviation was incomplete and fragmented. Some parts of the military branch were left under the control of the General Inspector of the Air Force, Field Marshal General (Generalfeldmarschall) Erhard Milch.

These were:

- Central Branch
- General Air Office
- All the inspectorates

The reasons for this formation was primarily to undermine Milch, who was getting favorable attention from the Nazi Party. However, later during the year and early 1938, Göring again changed the organization structure by removing three offices from Milch's and General Staff's control, bringing them under his own direct control.

These were:

- Personnel Office – under Major General (Generalmajor) Robert Ritter von Greim
- Air Defense – under general of anti-aircraft artillery (General der Flakartillerie) Günther Rüdel
- Technical Office – under Major General Ernst Udet

After the change these offices became additional power centers in RLM, further fragmenting the top Air force organization. It also crippled important functional areas.

== Organization ==
To gear-up for the European war as the air arm of the combined armed forces of Nazi Germany (Wehrmacht), the German Air force needed a high command equivalent to that of the Army (Oberkommando des Heeres) and the Navy (Oberkommando der Marine). Thus on 5 February 1935, the OKL was created, and in 1939 the structure of the German Air force was newly organized. The credit for the formation of a true high command goes to Air force general (General der Flieger) Günther Korten commander of Air Fleet 1 (Luftflotte 1) and his Chief of Operations, Karl Koller. They both campaigned to carve a command out of Göring's all-encompassing Ministry of Aviation. The intent was to put the German Air force on a true wartime footing, by grouping all the essential military parts of the RLM into a single command.

It included the following branches:

- General Staff
- Operational Staff
- All the Weapon's Inspectorate
- Quartermasters Branch
- Signals Service

Other areas such as training, administration, civil defense and technical design remained under RLM's control. The new organization proved to be more efficient and lasted until the end of the war.

OKL, like its army and navy counterparts, reported to the High Command of the Armed Forces (Oberkommando der Wehrmacht; OKW), which in turn was answerable to Hitler for the operation command of the three branches of the armed forces.

OKL was divided into Forward echelon (1. Staffel) and Rear echelon (2. Staffel). The Forward echelon moved with the theater of operations while Rear echelon remained almost exclusively in Berlin.

OKL was also the operational branch of the German Air force. It was divided operationally into Air fleets at a high level. Initially it was divided into four Air fleets (Luftflotten) that were formed geographically and were numbered consecutively. Three more Air fleets were added later on as Germany controlled territory grew further. Each Air fleet was a self-contained entity. The leader of each was in charge of overall air operations and support activities. However a Fighter leader (Jagdfliegerführer) was in charge of all the fighter operations and reported to the chief of the Air fleet.

Each Air fleet was further divided into Air districts (Luftgaue) and Flying Corps (Fliegerkorps). Each Air district had 50 to 150 officers led by a major general. It was responsible for providing administrative and logistical structure as well as resources to each airfield. The Flying Corps on the other hand were in charge of the operation matters related to flying such as unit deployment, air traffic control, ordnance and maintenance.

Since this organization was making the ground support structure available to flying units, the flying units were freed from moving the support staff from one location to another as the unit relocated. Once the unit arrived at its new location, all the airfield staff would come under the control of the commander of that unit.

== List of commanders ==
=== Commanders-in-Chief of the Luftwaffe ===
No.	Portrait	Commander-in-Chief of the Luftwaffe	Took office	Left office	Time in office	Ref.
1	Hermann Göring	Reichsmarschall; Hermann Göring (1893–1946)	1 March 1935	23 April 1945	10 years, 53 days	–
2	Robert Ritter von Greim	Generalfeldmarschall; Robert Ritter von Greim (1892–1945)	26 April 1945	8 May 1945	12 days	

=== Chief of General Staff of the OKL ===
Flag for the Chief of the OKL General Staff

No.	Portrait	Chief of the OKL General Staff	Took office	Left office	Time in office	Ref.
1	Walther Wever	Generalleutnant; Walther Wever (1887–1936)	1 March 1935	3 June 1936 †	1 year, 94 days	–
2	Albert Kesselring	General der Flieger; Albert Kesselring (1885–1960)	5 June 1936	31 May 1937	360 days	–
3	Hans-Jürgen Stumpff	General der Flieger; Hans-Jürgen Stumpff (1889–1968)	1 June 1937	31 January 1939	1 year, 244 days	–
4	Hans Jeschonnek	Generaloberst; Hans Jeschonnek (1899–1943)	1 February 1939	18 August 1943 †	4 years, 198 days	–
5	Günther Korten	General der Flieger; Günther Korten (1898–1944)	25 August 1943	22 July 1944 †	332 days	–
–	Werner Kreipe	General der Flieger; Werner Kreipe (1904–1967); Acting	2 August 1944	28 October 1944	87 days	–
6	Karl Koller	General der Flieger; Karl Koller (1898–1951)	12 November 1944	8 May 1945	177 days	
–	Hans-Jürgen Stumpff	Generaloberst; Hans-Jürgen Stumpff (1889–1968); Acting	8 May 1945	23 May 1945	15 days	–
