= Luftflotte Reich =

- Flag for the Chief of a Luftflotte
- Active: 5 February 1944
- Disbanded: 8 May 1945
- Country: Nazi Germany
- Branch: Luftwaffe
- Type: Command
- Size: ~160,000 (spring of 1944)
- Engagements: Defence of the Reich

Commanders
- Notable commanders: GenOberst Hans-Jürgen Stumpff

Luftflotte Reich (Air Fleet Reich) was one of the primary divisions of the German Luftwaffe in World War II. It was formed on February 5, 1944 in Berlin-Wannsee from Luftwaffenbefehlshaber Mitte. Its primary task was to defend German air space during the Defense of the Reich campaign.

It was among the only Luftwaffe division that was in possession of a sizable number of Me 262s and Me 163s fielding over 140 rocket aircraft as late as February 1945.

== Commanding officers ==
- Generaloberst Hans-Jürgen Stumpff, 5 February 1944 – 8 May 1945

=== Chief of staff ===
- Generalmajor Sigismund Freiherr von Falkenstein, 5 February – 12 May 1944
- Generalmajor Andreas Nielsen, 12 May 1944 – 8 May 1945
