= Hans-Jürgen Stumpff =

German general (1889–1968)

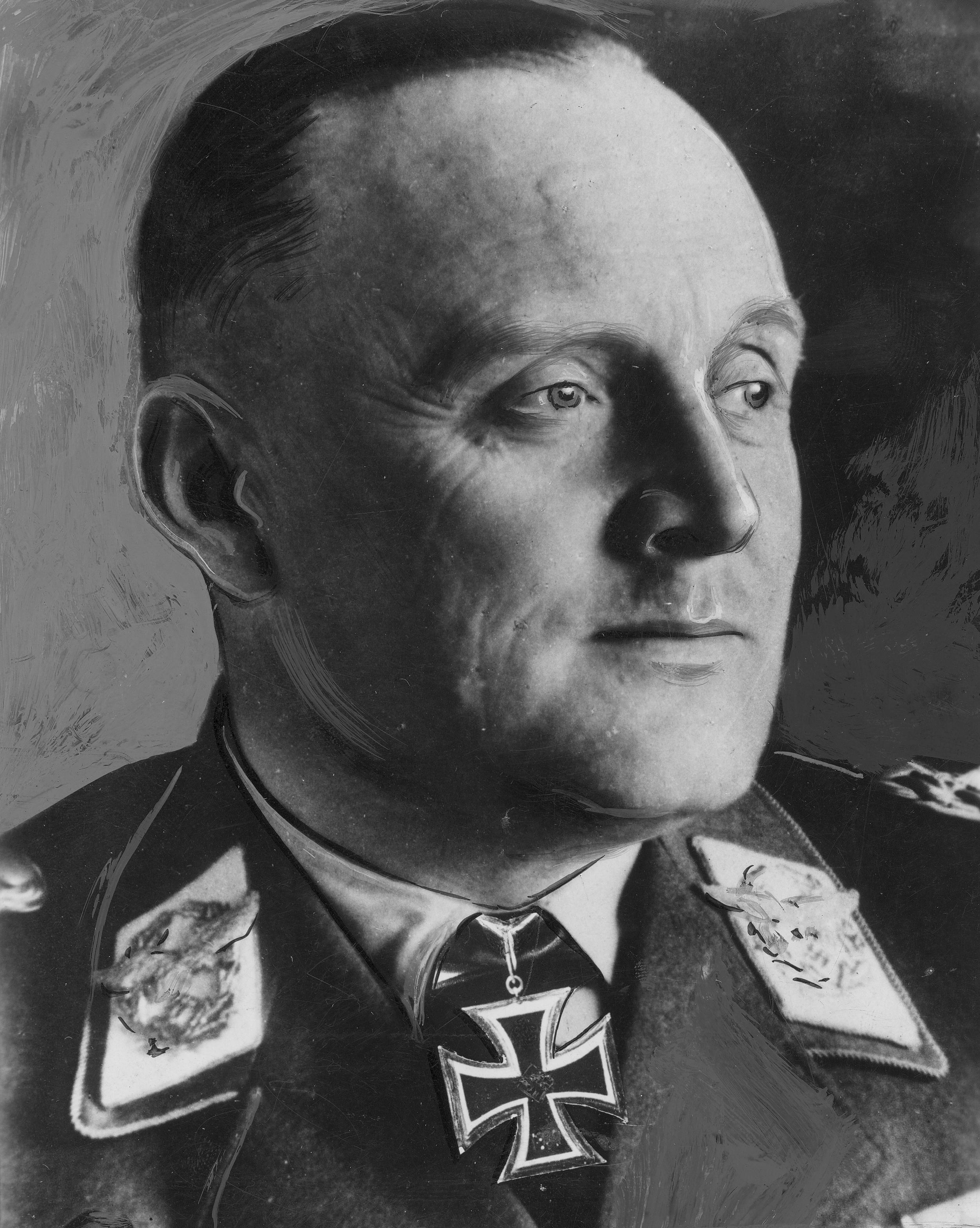
- Born: 15 June 1889; Kolberg, German Empire
- Died: 9 March 1968 (aged 78); Frankfurt am Main, West Germany
- Relatives: Horst Stumpff (brother); Karl-Günther von Hase (son in law)
- Military career
- Allegiance: German Empire; Weimar Republic; Nazi Germany
- Branch: Luftwaffe
- Service years: 1907–1945
- Rank: Generaloberst
- Commands: Chief of the Luftwaffe General Staff; Luftflotte Reich; Luftflotte 5
- Conflicts: World War I; World War II; Norwegian campaign; Battle of Britain; Defence of the Reich
- Awards: Knight's Cross of the Iron Cross

Signature
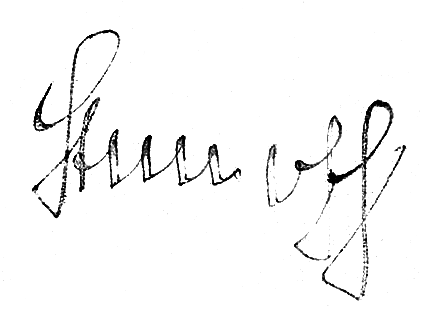

Hans-Jürgen Stumpff (15 June 1889 – 9 March 1968) was a German general during World War II and was one of the signatories to Germany's unconditional surrender at the end of the war.

== Military career ==
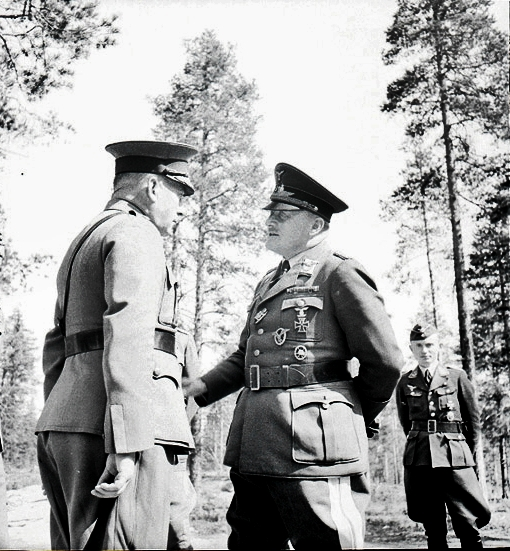
Stumpff (middle) and Hjalmar Siilasvuo

Stumpff joined the Grenadier Regiment "Prince Carl of Prussia" (2nd Brandenburg) No. 12 of the Prussian Army on 2 September 1907 as an Ensign and served on the General Staff during World War I with the rank of Captain. During the Weimar Republic, he served as a staff officer in the Reichswehrministerium. On 1 September 1933, Stumpff, with the rank of lieutenant colonel, became head of personnel in the (illegal) Luftwaffe. After the Luftwaffe became formally legal in Germany because of the Nazis rejection of the terms of the Treaty of Versailles, Stumpff served as its chief of staff from 1 June 1937 until 1 January 1939, when he was succeeded by Hans Jeschonnek In 1938, Stumpff was promoted to the rank of General der Flieger.

During the Second World War, Stumpff commanded various Luftflotten. On 19 July 1940, Stumpff was promoted to the rank of Generaloberst and awarded the Knight's Cross of the Iron Cross. Until the end of 1943 Stumpff commanded Luftflotte 5, with which he took part in the Battle of Britain, operating out of Norway against Scotland and Northern England. Stumpff was a recipient of the Knight's Cross of the Iron Cross of Nazi Germany.

In January 1944, Stumpff commanded Luftwaffe forces in the Defense of the Reich campaign against the Allied bombing attacks. On 8 May 1945, Stumpff served as the Luftwaffe representative at the signing of the unconditional surrender of Germany in Berlin. Stumpff was released from British captivity in 1947; he died in 1968.

== Awards and decorations ==
- Knight's Cross of the Iron Cross on 18 September 1941 as Generaloberst and Chief of Luftflotte 5 and Befehlshaber Nord (commander-in-chief north)
- Grand Cross with Swords of the Order of the White Rose of Finland on 27 October 1941 as Generaloberst

Military offices
Preceded by none	Chief of the Luftwaffe Personnel Office; 1 September 1933 – 31 May 1937	Succeeded by Robert Ritter von Greim
Preceded by Generalleutnant Albert Kesselring	Chief of the Luftwaffe General Staff; 1 June 1937 – 31 January 1939	Succeeded by Generaloberst Hans Jeschonnek
Preceded by Generalfeldmarschall Albert Kesselring	Commander of Luftflotte 1; 12 January 1940 – 10 May 1940	Succeeded by General Wilhelm Wimmer
Preceded by Generalfeldmarschall Erhard Milch	Commander of Luftflotte 5; 10 May 1940 – 27 November 1943	Succeeded by General Josef Kammhuber
Preceded by Generaloberst Hubert Weise	Commander of Luftwaffen-Befehlshaber Mitte; 23 December 1943 – 5 February 1945	Succeeded by Luftflotte Reich
Preceded by Luftwaffen-Befehlshaber Mitte	Commander of Luftflotte Reich; 5 February 1945 – 8 May 1945	Succeeded by none
Preceded by General der Flieger Karl Koller	Acting Chief of the Luftwaffe General Staff; 8 May 1945 – 23 May 1945	Succeeded by none
