= Rudolf Meister =

German general

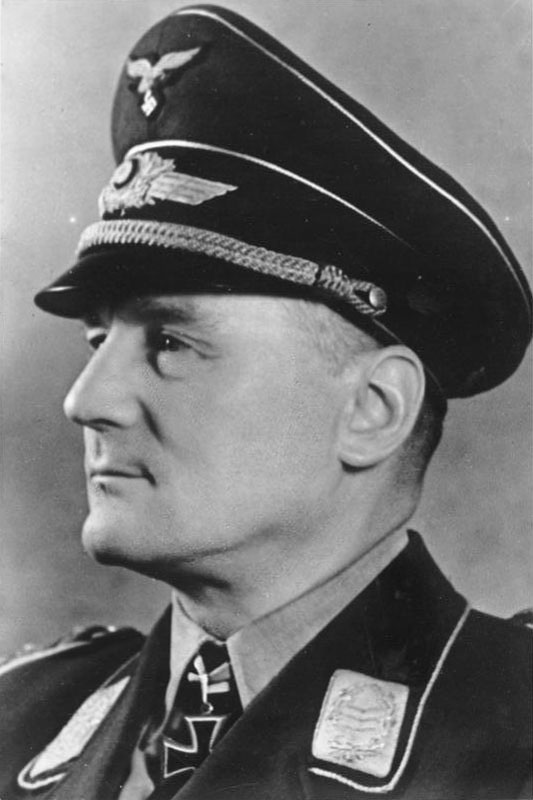
- Rudolf Meister
- Born: 1 August 1897; Cologne, German Empire
- Died: 11 September 1958 (aged 61); Hanover, West Germany
- Military career
- Allegiance: German Empire; Weimar Republic; Nazi Germany
- Branch: Prussian Army; Reichswehr; German Army; Luftwaffe
- Service years: 1914–1928; 1931–1945
- Rank: General der Flieger
- Commands: 4th Air Corps
- Conflicts: World War I; World War II; Eastern Front
- Awards: Knight's Cross of the Iron Cross

Rudolf Meister (1 August 1897 – 11 September 1958) was a German general (General der Flieger) in the Luftwaffe during World War II who commanded the 4th Air Corps. He was a recipient of the Knight's Cross of the Iron Cross of Nazi Germany. Meister surrendered to the American troops in May 1945 and was interned until 1948.

In 1950, Meister was one of the authors of the Himmerod memorandum which addressed the issue of rearmament (Wiederbewaffnung) of the Federal Republic of Germany after World War II.

== Awards and decorations ==
- German Cross in Gold on 30 October 1941 as Oberst im Generalstab (in the General Staff) of VIII. Fliegerkorps
- Knight's Cross of the Iron Cross on 5 September 1944 as Generalleutnant and commander of IV. Fliegerkorps

Military offices
Preceded by General der Flieger Kurt Pflugbeil	Commander of IV. Fliegerkorps; 4 September 1943 – 16 September 1944	Succeeded by Reformed into Deutschen Luftwaffe in Dänemark
Preceded by Previously IV. Fliegerkorps	Commander of Deutschen Luftwaffe in Dänemark; 1 October 1944 – 22 December 1944	Succeeded by Generalleutnant Alexander Holle
Preceded by Bruno Loerzer	Chief of the Luftwaffe Personnel Office; 22 December 1944 – 8 May 1945	Succeeded by None
