= 1st Air Corps (Germany) =

I. Fliegerkorps 1st Air Corps
- Flag of a commanding general of a Fliegerkorps
- Active: 11 October 1939 – 4 April 1945
- Country: Nazi Germany
- Branch: Luftwaffe
- Size: Corps

Commanders
- Notable commanders: Helmuth Förster; Günther Korten

I. Fliegerkorps (1st Air Corps) was formed 11 October 1939 in Cologne from the 1st Air Division. The Corps was also known as Luftwaffenkommando Don between 26 August 1942 until 17 February 1943. It was transformed to the 18th Air Division on 4 April 1945.

== Commanding officers ==
- Generaloberst Ulrich Grauert, 11 October 1939 – 15 May 1941
- General der Flieger Helmuth Förster, 3 June 1941 – 23 August 1942
- General der Flieger Günther Korten, 24 August 1942 – 11 June 1943
- Generalleutnant Alfred Mahnke (acting), 1 April 1943 – 25 June 1943
- Generalleutnant Karl Angerstein, 26 June 1943 – 6 November 1943
- General der Flieger Paul Deichmann, 7 November 1943 – 3 April 1945

=== Chiefs of Staff ===
- Oberst Rudolf Meister, 18 December 1939 – 22 June 1940
- Generalmajor Walter Boenicke, 22 June 1940 – 8 November 1941
- Oberst Werner Kreipe, 8 November 1941 – 25 October 1942
- Oberst Klaus Uebe, 25 October 1942 – 24 August 1943
