= General Fuchs =

General Fuchs may refer to:

- Georg Fuchs (general) (1856―1939), Prussian General of the Infantry
- Robert Fuchs (general) (1895–1977), German Luftwaffe major general
- Yehuda Fuchs (born 1969), Israel Defense Forces major general
