= Kreipe =

Kreipe is a German surname. Notable people with the surname include:

- Heinrich Kreipe (1895–1976), German general
- Werner Kreipe (1904–1967), German general
