= Waber =

Waber is a surname. Notable people with the surname include:

- Bernard Waber (1921–2013), American writer
- Bernhard Waber (1884–1945), German Air Force officer
- Christian Waber (born 1948), Swiss politician
- Leopold Waber (1875–1945), Austrian lawyer and politician
