= Hans H. Steinberg =

German actor

- Born: 1950 (age 75–76)
- Education: West Coast Actors Studio Vancouver
- Years active: 1987–present
- Known for: Der Fahnder; Off Beat; Downfall

Hans H. Steinberg is a German film, television, and stage actor, best known for his short role as Karl Koller in the film Downfall.

== Life ==
Steinberg trained as an actor at the West Coast Actors Studio in Vancouver. In 1993, Steinberg appeared in the series Der Fahnder and from this time on appeared in series such as Ein starkes Team, Marienhof, Die Rosenheim-Cops, SOKO 5113 and Sturm der Liebe, as well as in movies for TV and cinema. In the film Downfall, he played the short role of General der Flieger Karl Koller.

Steinberg is also active as a stage actor, in the season 2009/2010 his role in Schiller's drama The Robbers was Maximilian von Moor.

Before that he worked from 1983 to 1987 in the TIK-Theater in Munich and then went on tour with various pieces.

He also played in the Karl May Games in Bad Segeberg in 1993 and 1994. In the summer of 2014, Hans H. Steinberg participated in the Störtebeker Festival in Ralswiek on the island of Rügen.

Steinberg lives in Munich and speaks fluent German and English. He likes playing golf, horse riding, and tennis, and can play the guitar and piano.

== Filmography ==
=== Film ===
- 1959: Bevor der Blitz einschlägt
- 1987: Stadtrand
- 1988: Schade Josie
- 1990: The Indian
- 1993: The Movie Teller
- 1999: Almost
- 2004: Downfall – General Koller
- 2004: Off Beat – Einsatzleiter Feuerwehr
- 2011: The Evidence (Short) – Person
- 2014: Die Verantwortlichen
- 2015: Monopoly
- 2019: Die Goldfische – Herr Kowalczyk

=== Television ===
- 1991: Hafendetektiv, ARD
- 1992: Sterne des Südens, ARD
- 1993: Blank Meier Jensen, ARD
- 1993: Der Fahnder, ARD
- 1994: Berlin Break, RTL
- 1994: Notärztin, Pro7
- 1995: Die Wache, RTL
- 1996: Aus heiterem Himmel, ZDF
- 1996: Ein starkes Team, ZDF
- 1997: Aus heiterem Himmel, ZDF
- 1998: Mobbing Girls, ARD
- 1999: Großstadtrevier, NDR
- 2000: Der Doc, SAT 1
- 2000: Absolut das Leben, ARD
- 2001: So schnell Du kannst, ZDF
- 2003: Rosenheim Cops, ZDF
- 2004: Klinikum Berlin Mitte, RTL
- 2006: SOKO 5113, ZDF
- 2007: Lilly Schönauer, ZDF
- 2007: Die Frauen der Parkallee, ZDF
- 2008: Soko 5113, ZDF
- 2009:/2008 Marienhof, ARD
- 2010: Sturm der Liebe, ARD
- 2012: Der Kaktus, ARD/ORF
- 2013: Die Chefin, ZDF
- 2015: Schon geerbt, ARD/Degeto
- 2016: Zwei Tänzer für Isolde, ARD/Degeto
- 2016: Das Ende der Romanows, ZDF
- 2017: Stuttgart Homicide, ZDF

== Links ==
- Hans H. Steinberg at IMDb
- Hans H. Steinberg bei agentur-reimann.de
- Hans H. Steinberg bei filmmakers.de
- Hans H. Steinberg showreel
