= Paul Deichmann =

- Born: 27 August 1898; Fulda, Regierungsbezirk Kassel, Province of Hesse-Nassau, Kingdom of Prussia, German Empire
- Died: 10 January 1981 (aged 82); Hamburg, West Germany
- Military career
- Allegiance: German Empire; Weimar Germany; Nazi Germany; West Germany
- Branch: Imperial German Army; Reichswehr; Luftwaffe
- Service years: 1916–1960s
- Rank: General der Flieger
- Commands: 1st Air Corps; 1st Air Division; 18th Air Division
- Conflicts: World War I World War II
- Awards: Knight's Cross of the Iron Cross

Paul Deichmann (27 August 1898 – 10 January 1981) was a German general during World War II. He was a recipient of the Knight's Cross of the Iron Cross, an award for bravery or superior leadership service.

== Life ==
Deichmann was born in Fulda on 27 August 1898 and was educated with the cadet corps. He entered the German Imperial Army as a Fähnrich in the 86th Regiment of Fusiliers on 29 March 1916, and was commissioned a Leutnant a week prior to his eighteenth birthday. In the following August he began service with Luftstreitkräfte as an observer, and continued this duty to the end of World War I.

After the end of the war, Deichmann joined a Freikorps fighting in Courland and was accepted into the Reichswehr in May 1920. On 1 October 1920, he transferred to the 3rd Prussian Infantry Regiment, and in August 1925 was promoted to Oberleutnant. He was temporarily released from the Army in 1928 and returned to active duty in 1931 with the 1st Infantry Regiment, and was promoted to Hauptmann in 1933. With the official establishment of the German Luftwaffe on 1 October 1934, he entered the Reich Air Ministry.

=== WWII ===
- 1939 to 1940 Chief of Staff to the Chief of Air Force Training
- 1940 to 1942 Chief of Staff of the II Flying Corps
- 1942 to 1943 Chief of the General Staff of the Commander-in-Chief South and the 2nd Air Fleet
- 1943 Commander of the 1st Aviation Division
- 1943 to 1944 Commanding General of the I. Fliegerkorps
- 1945 Commander-in-Chief of Luftwaffe Command 4

=== Post-WWII ===
Deichmann was released as a POW on 22 December 1947, having already completed his first writings for the Operational History (German) Section of the Historical Division of the United States Army. From 1952 to 1958, he was the control officer and therefore head of the "German Air Force Monograph Project" of the USAF Historical Division in Karlsruhe. He was then appointed head of a historical study group (Studiengruppe) at the Führungsakademie der Bundeswehr (FüAkBw), where he also gave numerous lectures.

== Death ==
General der Flieger (ret.) Deichmann died on 10 January 1981 in Hamburg.

== Awards and decorations ==
- Iron Cross (1914), 2nd and 1st Class
- Preußisches Flugzeugbeobachter-Abzeichen (Prussian Observer Badge)
- Hanseatic Cross Hamburg
- Wound Badge (1918) in Black
- Honour Cross of the World War 1914/1918 with Swords
- Wehrmacht Long Service Award, 4th to 1st Class
- Clasp to the Iron Cross (1939), 2nd and 1st Class
- German Cross in Gold on 20 April 1942
- Knight's Cross of the Iron Cross on 26 March 1944 as Generalleutnant and commanding general of the II. Fliegerkorps
- Air University Award on 31 December 1963 as the first foreigner

== Works (excerpt) ==
- Luftwaffe Methods in the Selection of Offensive Weapons (together with Generalingenieur Dipl.-Ing. Ernst A. Marquard)
  - Deichmann describes prewar and wartime operational problems, such as the need for weapons that could disperse the tightly packed American bomber boxes, prompting the Luftwaffe to rearm its aircraft—in this case with mortars, rockets, and even tow cables. Importantly, he frames weapons procurement as a technological, political, supply, and timing challenge. Putting the right bomb on target required having a responsive weapons development team (if the bomb type was not already in inventory) and getting munitions to the right unit at the right time.
- Die Ausbildung der deutschen Luftwaffe bis zum Kriegsbeginn, Studiengruppe Luftwaffe, US-Historical Division, Karlsruhe
- Kampf um die Luftüberlegenheit im Feldzug gegen Frankreich, Studiengruppe Luftwaffe, US-Historical Division, Karlsruhe
- Unterstützung des Heeres durch die deutsche Luftwaffe, Studiengruppe Luftwaffe, US-Historical Division, Karlsruhe
  - German Air Force Operations in Support of the Army. New York Arno Press, 1968, Repr.: USAF Historical Studies No. 163, USAF Historical Division, Research Studies Institute, Air University 1962
- The System of Target Selection Applied by the German Air Force in World War II, USAF Historical Studies No. 186, USAF Historical Division, 1956
- Der Chef im Hintergrund. Ein Leben als Soldat von der preußischen Armee bis zur Bundeswehr. Stalling 1979
- Spearhead for Blitzkrieg – Luftwaffe Operations in Support of the Army, 1939–1945, Ivy Book, New York 1996 ISBN 0-8041-1695-4.

Military offices
Preceded by Generalmajor Otto Zech	Commander of 1st Air Division; 26 June 1943 – 7 November 1943	Succeeded by Generalmajor Robert Fuchs
Preceded by none	Commander of 18th Air Division; 4 April 1945 – 26 April 1945	Succeeded by Generalmajor Paul Weitkus
