= Rudolf Bogatsch =

German general during World War II

- Born: 4 September 1891
- Died: 5 June 1970 (aged 78)
- Military career
- Allegiance: German Empire; Weimar Republic; Nazi Germany
- Branch: Prussian Army; Reichsheer; Luftwaffe
- Service years: 1914–1945
- Rank: General der Flieger
- Commands: IV. Flakkorps
- Conflicts: World War II
- Awards: Knight's Cross of the Iron Cross

Rudolf Bogatsch (4 September 1891 – 5 June 1970) was a general in the Luftwaffe of Nazi Germany during World War II who commanded the IV. Flakkorps. He was a recipient of the Knight's Cross of the Iron Cross.

== Awards and decorations ==
- Knight's Cross of the Iron Cross on 20 March 1942 as General der Flieger and General der Luftwaffe beim Oberbefehlshaber des Heeres

Military offices
Preceded by General Otto-Wilhelm von Renz	Commander of IV. Flakkorps; 12 September 1944 - 8 May 1945	Succeeded by None
