= Werderaner Wachtelberg =

Vineyard in Brandenburg, Germany

Coordinates: 52°22′11″N 12°56′0″E

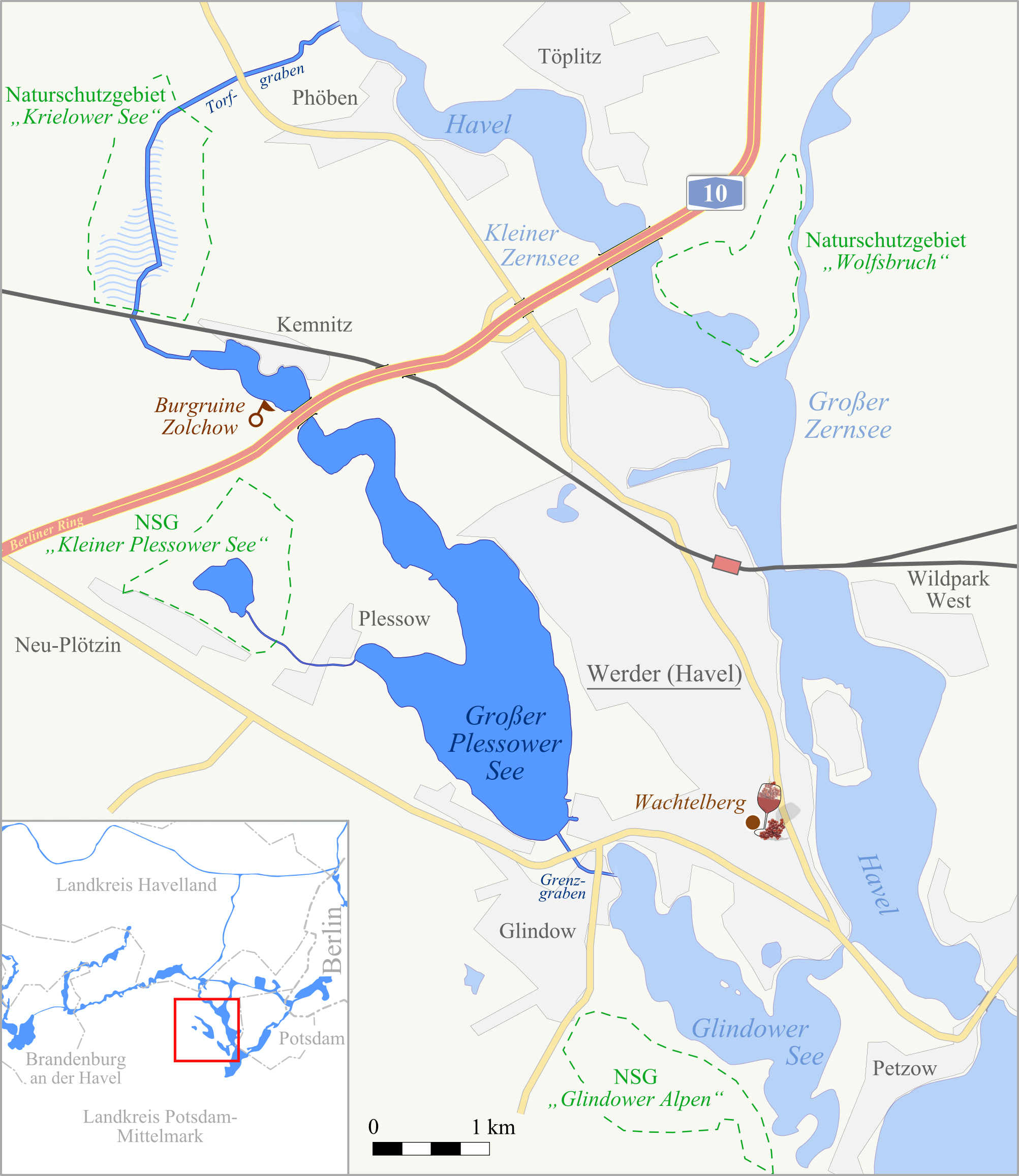
Location of the Wachtelberg in Werder

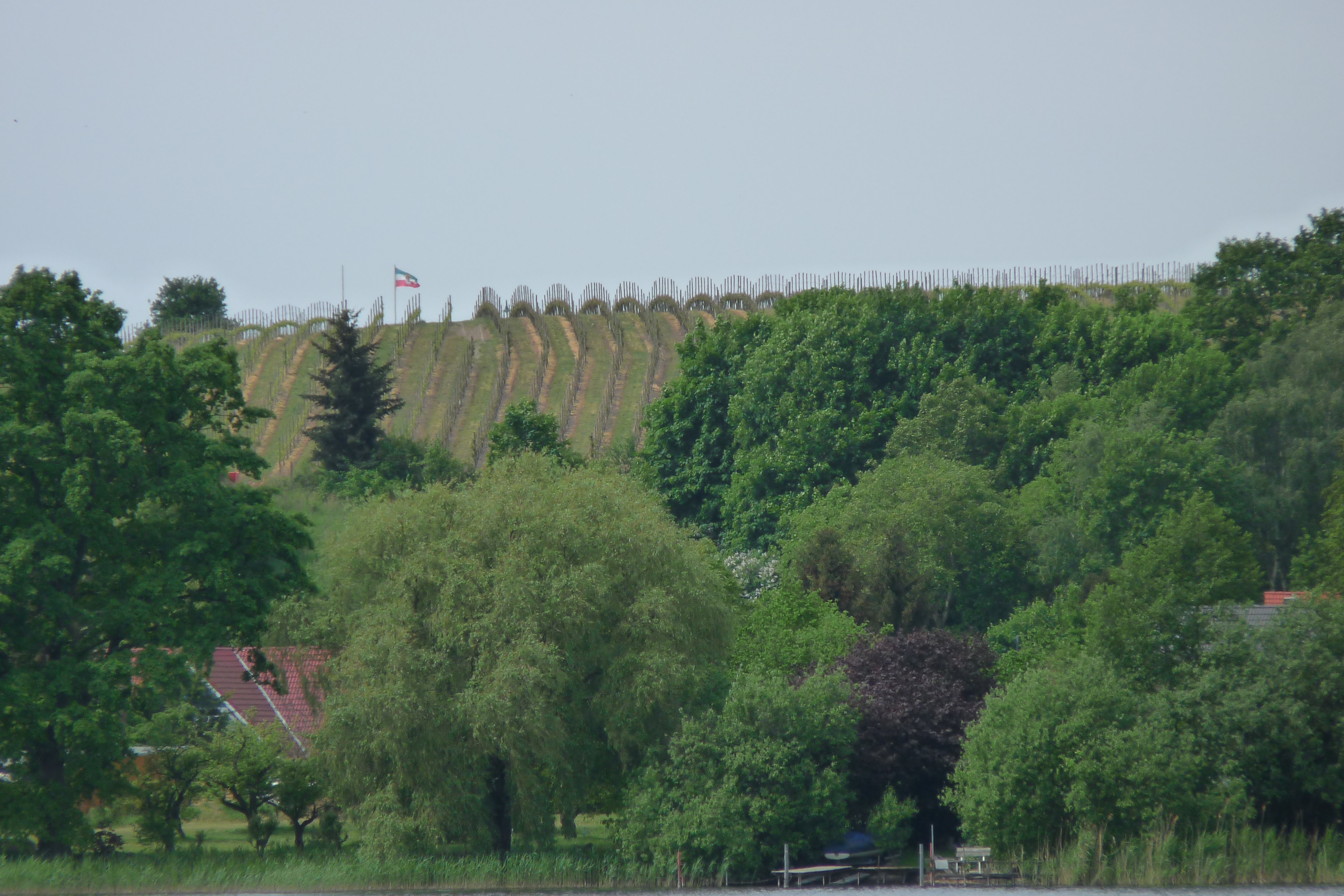
The Wachtelberg as seen from the Havel

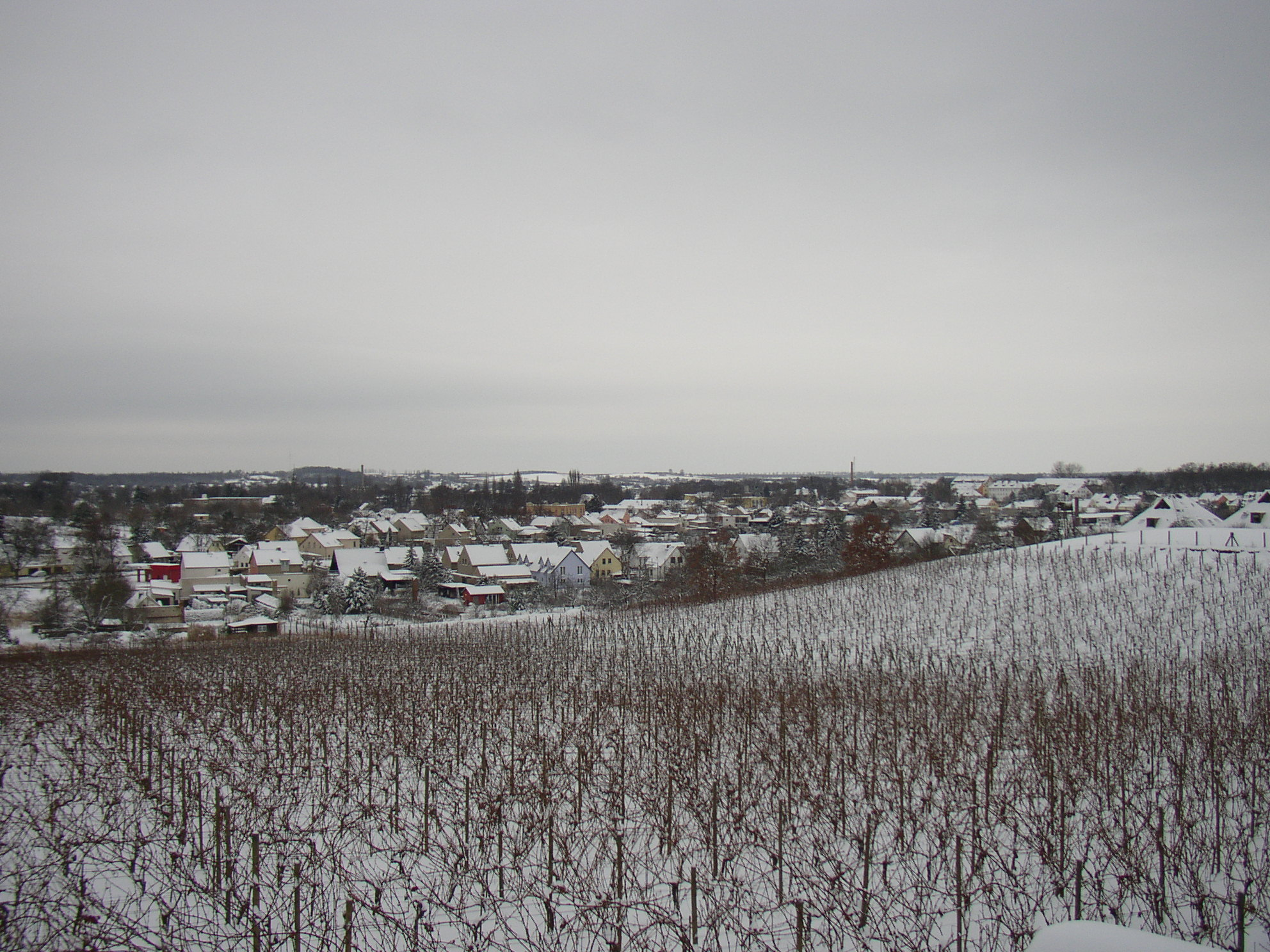
Winter on the Wachtelberg

The Werderaner Wachtelberg is a 6.2 hectares (15 acres) vineyard in the town of Werder (Havel) in Brandenburg. As the northernmost outpost of the Saale-Unstrut wine region, it is the most northern registered location for QbA quality wine in Germany.

== Location, climate and soil ==
The Wachtelberg (German for "quail's mountain") is located on a 60 m high hill east of the River Havel shaped in the last ice age. The ridge is a remnant of a terminal moraine, formed in the Weichselian glaciation of the last glacial period.

There is a temperate climate on the Werderaner Wachtelberg, affected by the Atlantic climate from the north and west and a continental climate from the east. Weather extremes are not commonplace. The temperature profile around Werder is similar to the national average for Germany. Seasonal temperature fluctuations are smaller than the usual continental climate, but higher than in the balanced maritime climate of coastal regions. Precipitation is, with an annual sum of 519 mm, also relatively small. The area is surrounded by the Schwielowsee, Großer Zernsee and the Glindow-See, and due to its positioning between these vast lakes, a slightly higher than German-average temperature is often measured.

The peculiarity of the vineyard is that the vines grow in slightly argillaceous sand soil. This sandy soil produces mild wines with low acidity. In 1991, the vineyard was affiliated as a single vineyard site ("großlagenfreie Einzellage") by the wine growing region of Saale-Unstrut and thus recognized by the EU. The Wachtelberg is now a classified German vineyard and can be found under the registration 11.1.5.-017 in the vineyard register (Weinbergrolle).

== Viticulture introduction to the Margraviate of Brandenburg ==
The introduction of viticulture in the Margraviate of Brandenburg was part of the German eastward expansion, which was started in 1125 by King Lothair III. As a result of this policy, Albert the Bear established his rule in Brandenburg some 25 years later. Historical studies have shown that a wine culture was introduced to Brandenburg from the West. This introduction is part of a west-east spread of viticulture in the Middle Ages in connection with the extension of Frankish and German domination and the spread of Christianity in Europe. During the whole period of the Middle Ages, the Roman Catholic Church and its monasteries were sponsors of the wine culture in the margraviate. The church promoted wineries because wine was used for Holy Communion. In addition to the Franks and the Flemish settlers, it was the Cistercians who played a decisive role in viticulture around the Havel at the time. This must be regarded as the origins for the vineyard in Werder. In order to be able to meet the demands for consistently high quality, the winegrower had to be able to react flexibly to the time of harvest, varieties, quantities and external influences. A transport of the grapes to Saxony-Anhalt resulted in considerable losses in quality. Therefore, Dr. Lindicke decided to build his own winery in Werder. This has been in operation since 2012 and the grapes can be processed immediately after harvesting.

== See also ==
- German wine
- List of German wine regions
