= Tiene (container) =

Container for transporting wine and fruit in Germany

Coordinates: 52°22′09.24″N 12°55′57.00″E

A Tiene (plural: Tienen), sometimes also called Tine or Obsttiene (Obst is German for fruit), was a special container for transporting wine and fruit. These were used until shortly after the First World War, mostly in the Brandenburg city of Werder in northern Germany. Normally the wooden tubs were carried on people's backs to small boats and shipped on the Havel River to market stalls in Berlin.

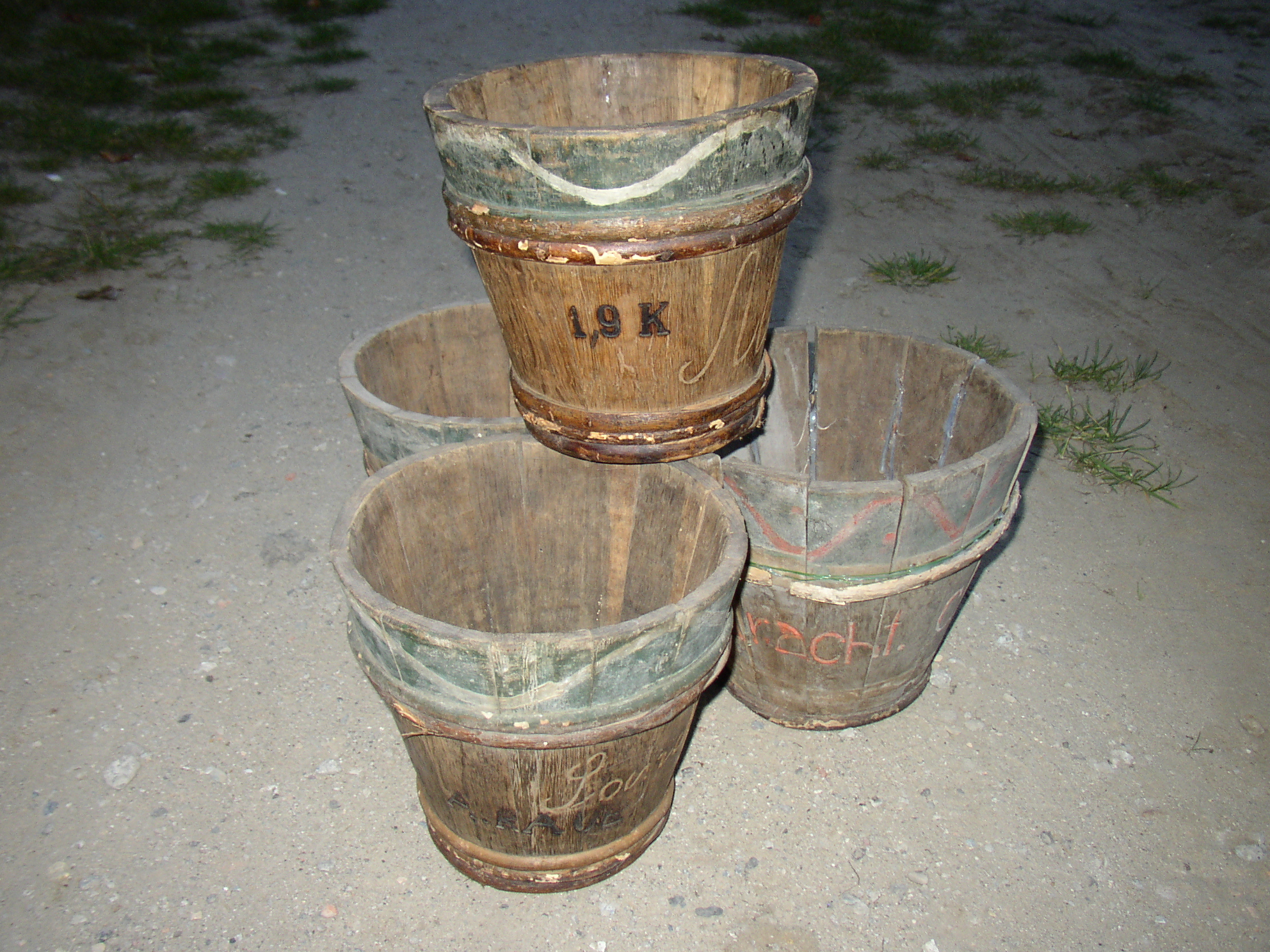
Tienen

== History ==
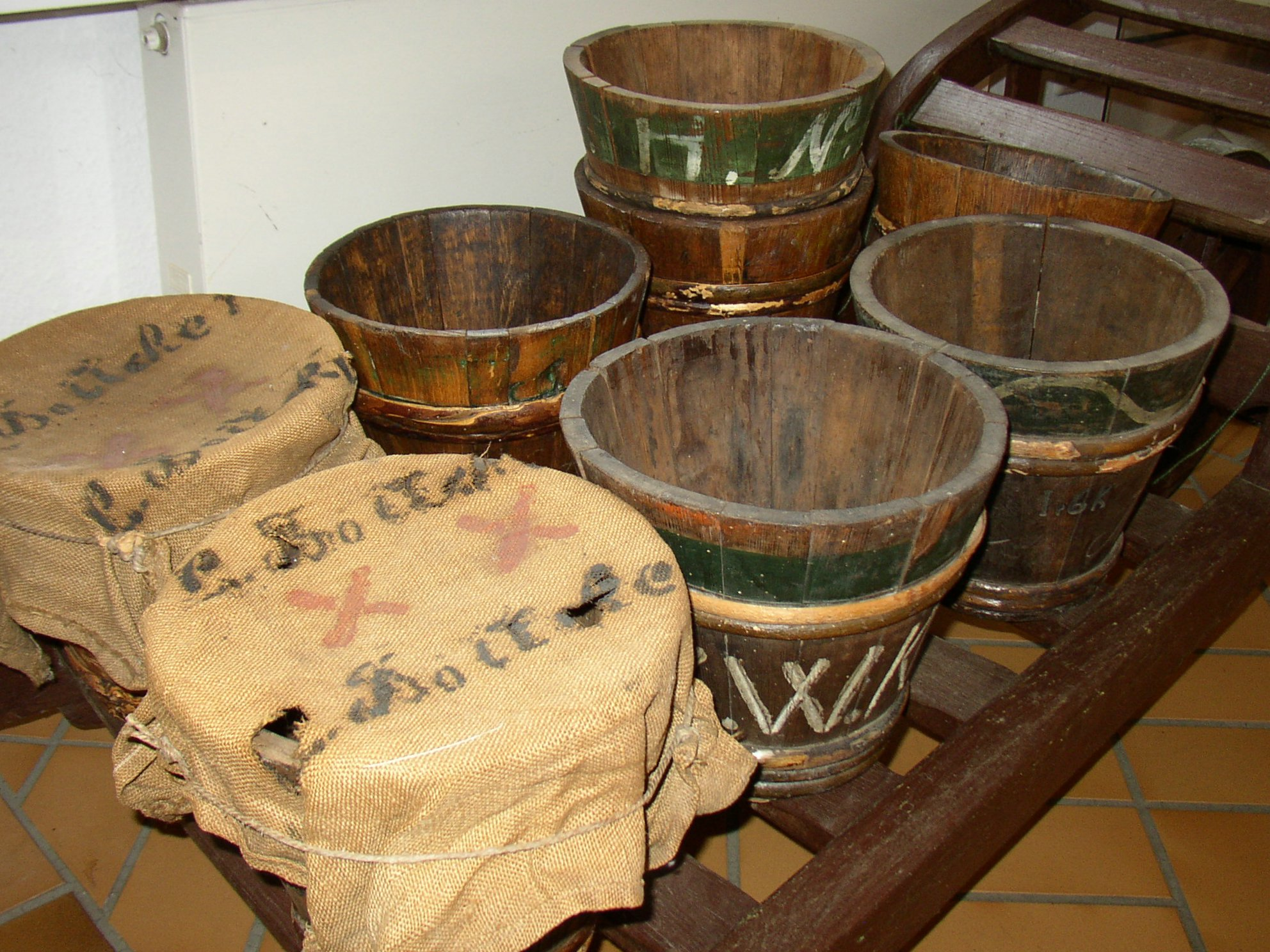
Full Tienen with tops covered with linen

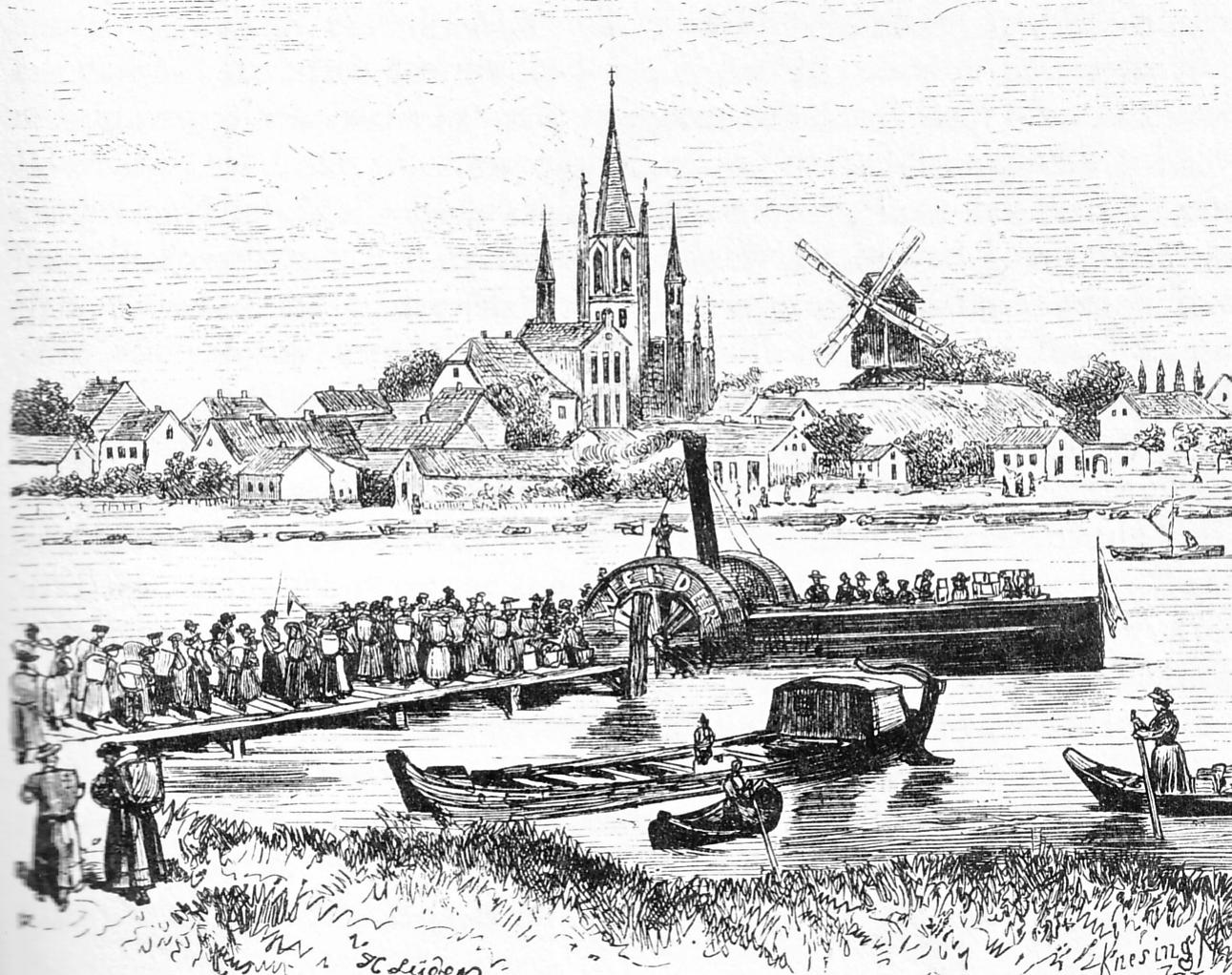
Loading Tienen full of fruit onto a steamer for transport to Berlin; 1881 lithograph by H. Lüders

The fruit-growing area around the river island city of Werder has a long tradition, back to the fruit fields of the Cistercian monks at Lehnin Abbey, one of the oldest monastic foundations in Brandenberg, established in 1180. The abbey lands produced large amounts of grapes and other fruits which were processed and transported to Berlin.

The term Tiene comes from the wooden vats in which the grapes were pressed for processing into wine, used originally in the 16th and 17th centuries. In the 19th century, fruit growers transferred the term to the small wooden tubs in which they transported their fruit.

== Capacity and construction ==
A Tiene holds approximately 7 litres, or 3.5 to 4 kg mass, depending on the kind of fruit. The oak tubs weigh 1.8 kg, while tubs made from spruce weigh 1.6 kg. The conical Tienen were prepared for shipping by covering the top with linen cloth. By about 1900 more than 200,000 Tienen were in use in the Werder region and their production was a significant craft industry in the town.

Three coopers worked on the island and it is to be supposed that the cooper's trade began in the 18th century in Werder. Before the Tienen were sold to the fruit farmers, the coopers had to calibrate them. The Tienen were dried and then weighed and the dead weight was branded on the outside. A new Tiene for cherries with a capacity of 7 to 9 pounds cost sixty pfennigs in 1908. A Tiene for raspberries weighed 50 to 60 pounds.

Werder pioneered these transport containers and when it introduced the 'chip' basket (made from wooden chips) in 1910, the Tienen quickly lost their former importance.

== Significance of the industry ==
In his travelogue Wanderungen durch die Mark Brandenburg, Theodor Fontane recalled walking to school in Berlin past the Werder people at their original position for selling their fruit, at Burgstraße between the Friedrichsbrücke and Herkulesbrücke bridges.

At times it also happened that from the Unterbaum we saw the late 'second wave' of the Werder folks arrive, big barges crammed with Tienen, while twenty Werder women sat on the oar benches, moving with equal energy their oars and their heads in their pannier hats ... The air swam within a refreshing aroma, and the cupola of inverted and heaped up wooden Tienen was more interesting to us than the commode-shaped Monbijou Palace and, sad to say, also more interesting than the forest of columns of Schinkel's New Museum.

== Sources ==
- Dr. H.-Joachim Koch. "Blütenstadt Werder/Havel" Heimatgeschichtliche Beiträge 1984 pp. 18–21 (in German)
