= Off Beat (2004 film) =

- Directed by: Hendrik Hölzemann
- Written by: Hendrik Hölzemann
- Produced by: Jan. S. Kaiser
- Starring: Matthias Schweighöfer; Jessica Schwarz; Florian Lukas
- Release date: 2004
- Running time: 1h 40m
- Country: Germany
- Languages: German, Turkish

Off Beat (German: Kammerflimmern) is a 2004 German film directed by Hendrik Hölzemann.

== Plot ==
Paramedic Paul "Crash" Partenheimer (Matthias Schweighöfer) is working without end, even though he is no longer happy there. He is emotionally cold. Only his dreams provide some happiness: Again and again he sees the same woman. But unfortunately these are just dreams. And then one day the pregnant November (Jessica Schwarz) is in front of him - and her boyfriend is on the floor with an overdose.

== Synopsis ==
The film opens on the accident that Crash survives as a child. His parents die in the accident, and Crash survives with a few scars and the memory of what happened. He goes through the motions during his life as a Paramedic; he smokes excessively, he skateboards in his free time and he works almost constantly. He encounters many helpless people going through various problems, most end without success; a homeless man, a suicidal girl. One of his Paramedic friends, Richie (Florian Lukas), abuses drugs that they would administer to patients. He dreams frequently about a woman, who we initially can't see. On a call to a patient suffering a drug overdose, he meets November, who is heavily pregnant with her overdosed boyfriend's baby. Crash is unable to save November's boyfriend (Carlo Ljubek). Crash and November develop their relationship, and spend time together ahead of November's imminent due date. Crash's mood and personality improves, and he seems to be coming back to life.

The film ends with Crash and an in - labour November speeding to the hospital in the back of one of an ambulance (driven by one of Crash's other partners, Fido). The ambulance crashes, and a light fills the screen. Crash is in an unconscious state, skateboarding down a deserted road, seemingly giving up. Then, a heartbeat is heard.

== Cast ==
- Matthias Schweighöfer: Paul "Crash" Partenheimer
- Jessica Schwarz: November
- Florian Lukas: Richie
- Jan-Gregor Kremp: Fido
- Bibiana Beglau: Dr. Tod / Frau Neumann
- Carlo Ljubek: Tommy
- Hans Steinberg: Head of Fire Service

== Production ==
Jessica Schwarz wasn't really pregnant during filming. She had a fake belly and she was partly replaced by a double in the sex scene.

== Awards and nominations ==
Bavarian Film Awards (2005)

- Best Actress, Jessica Schwarz - Won
- Best Young Actor, Matthias Schweighöfer - Won

Film + (2005)

- Editing Award, Patricia Rommel - Won

German Camera Award (2005)

- Outstanding Editing (feature film), Patricia Rommel - Won
- Feature Film, Lars Liebold - Nominated
