= Helmuth Förster =

German general and Knight's Cross recipient (1889–1965)

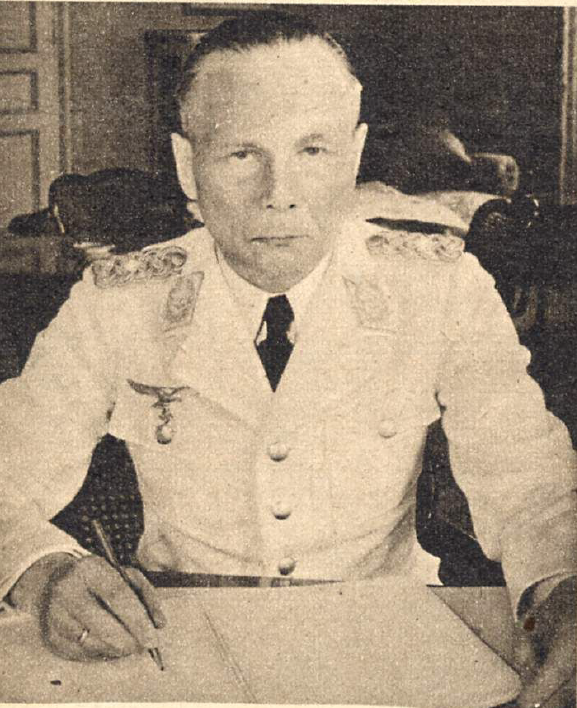
- Förster in 1940
- Born: 19 April 1889; Groß Strehlitz, German Empire
- Died: 7 April 1965 (aged 75); Lenggries, Bavaria, West Germany
- Military career
- Allegiance: German Empire; Weimar Republic; Nazi Germany
- Branch: Imperial German Army; Reichswehr; Luftwaffe
- Service years: 1907–1919; 1934–1945
- Rank: General der Flieger
- Commands: 1st Air Corps
- Conflicts: World War I World War II
- Awards: Knight's Cross of the Iron Cross

Helmuth Förster (19 April 1889 – 7 April 1965) was a German general in the Luftwaffe during World War II. A decorated World War I aviator, he returned to military service in 1934 as an Oberstleutnant in the Luftwaffe. Promoted to Oberst in 1936, he was appointed to command the 4th Bomber Wing. During the invasion of Poland, Förster, by now a Generalmajor, commanded the Luftwaffen-Lehrdivision with significant success. He was then appointed as chief of staff of the 5th Air Fleet during the invasion of Norway. After serving on the German-French Peace Commission, he was appointed as military governor of the German-occupied territory of Serbia from April to June 1941, then commanded the 1st Air Corps during the invasion of the Soviet Union until October 1942. Whilst in command of the 1st Air Corps he was awarded the Knight's Cross of the Iron Cross. He spent the remainder of the war as chief of administration at the Reich Ministry of Aviation. He was pensioned as an Oberstleutnant in 1952.

== Awards and decorations ==
- Knight's Cross of the Iron Cross on 22 February 1942 as General der Flieger and commander of I. Flieger-Korps

== Footnotes ==
Military offices
Preceded by Generaloberst Ulrich Grauert	Commander of 1st Air Corps; 3 June 1941 – 23 August 1942	Succeeded by General der Flieger Günther Korten
