= Martin Fiebig =

German Luftwaffe general (1891–1947)

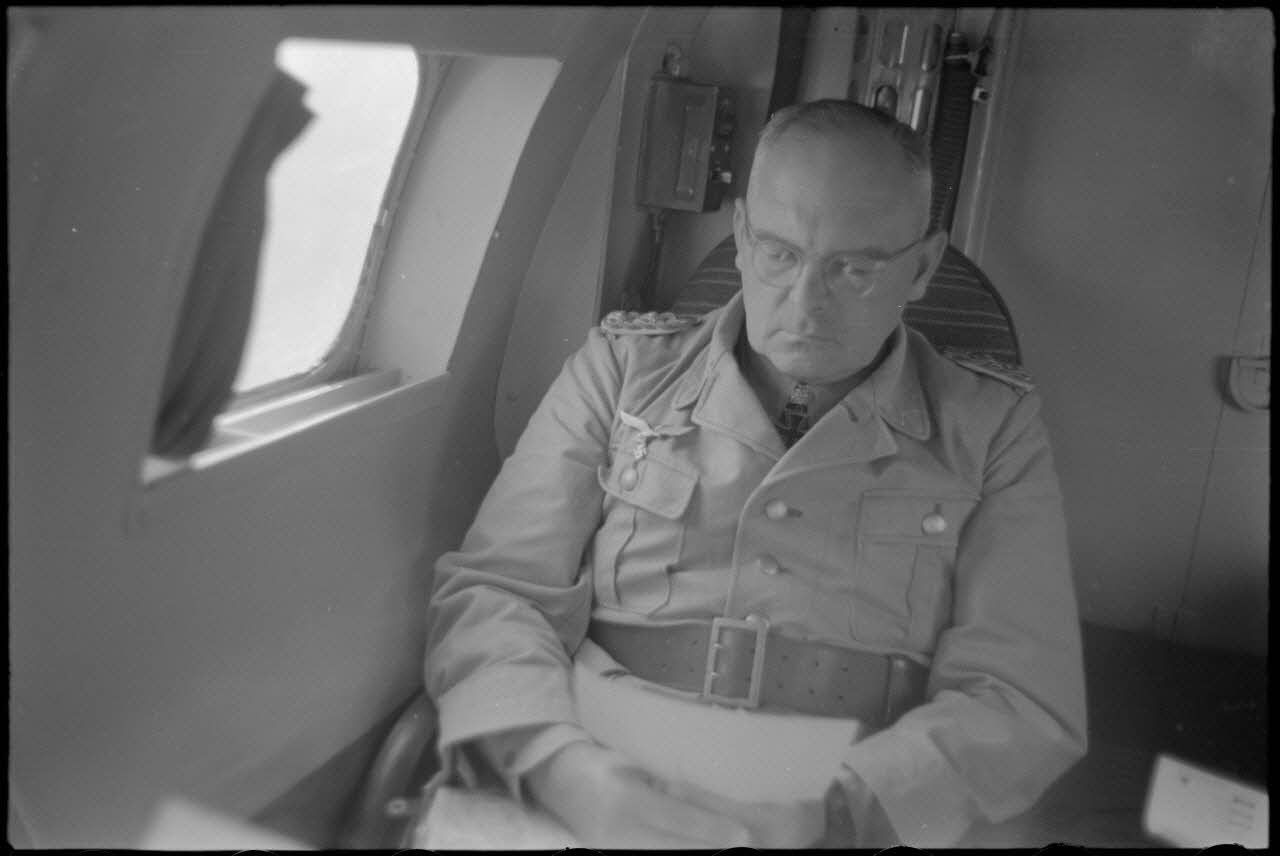
- Fiebig in 1943
- Born: 7 May 1891; Rösnitz, German Empire
- Died: 23 October 1947 (aged 56); Belgrade, Yugoslavia
- Military career
- Allegiance: German Empire; Weimar Republic; Nazi Germany
- Branch: Luftwaffe
- Service years: 1910–1945
- Rank: General der Flieger
- Commands: KG 4 VIII Fliegerkorps
- Conflicts: World War I World War II
- Awards: Knight's Cross of the Iron Cross with Oak Leaves

Martin Fiebig (7 May 1891 – 23 October 1947) was a German Luftwaffe general who commanded several air corps and equivalent-sized formations during World War II. He was a recipient of the Knight's Cross of the Iron Cross with Oak Leaves.

After World War II had ended, Fiebig was extradited to Yugoslavia, where he was tried and convicted of war crimes, specifically for his role in the bombing of Belgrade in April 1941. Fiebig was sentenced to death and executed in 1947.

== Early life and World War I ==
Martin Fiebig was born on 7 May 1891 in Rösnitz, Upper Silesia. He served in World War I, and was promoted to Oberleutnant on 18 June 1915. From August 1914 to 1915, he served in the 18th Infantry Regiment. Sometime during 1915, he was transferred from the infantry to become a pilot. From 1915 to 1 August 1918, he was a pilot and squadron leader in the 3rd Bomber Wing.

== Interwar period ==
In May 1925, Fiebig, now a Hauptmann (captain), led a team of seven expert German World War I pilots (known as Gruppe Fiebig) to the Soviet Union, where they were employed as special air force advisers and instructors at various training schools in the Moscow area. Fiebig was seconded to the command staff of the Zhukovsky Air Force Engineering Academy.

Despite his formal role, his input into the training of Soviet pilots was quite limited; for example, he had no control over the practical exercises undertaken by the students. His position did enable him to draw conclusions about Soviet air training, doctrine and strategy. He observed that Soviet air training was too focused on the quantity of pilots produced, and that there were significant deficiencies in theoretical instruction.

Moreover, his observations about the deficiencies of Soviet air training were echoed by the deputy director of the Academy. Further, Fiebig concluded that Soviet air doctrine was confused, largely due to the limited experience of the Soviet Union in air operations during World War I. He also recognised that Soviet air strategy was reactive, in sharp contrast to that of other European powers, especially Germany.

According to author Samuel Mitcham, in the late 1920s, Fiebig was trained in close air support techniques at the clandestine German air training school in the Soviet Union.

== World War II ==
At the outbreak of war, Fiebig was an Oberst (colonel) commanding the 4th Bomber Wing (German: Kampfgeschwader 4, KG4) which flew Heinkel He 111 medium bombers, which first saw operational service during the invasion of Poland. On 10 May 1940, in the early stages of the Battle of the Netherlands, he was shot down and captured by the Dutch during the initial attack on Rotterdam-Waalhaven airfield. He had led the attack by II Gruppe of KG 4 and his was one of the first planes shot down. He was released following the German victory and conquest of the Netherlands.

Fiebig then commanded KG4 during the Battle of Belgium, the Battle of France, and the Battle of Britain. On 8 May 1940, he was awarded the Knight's Cross of the Iron Cross. In April 1941, he led KG4 during the German-led Axis invasion of Yugoslavia including the bombing of Belgrade.

During the Battle of Stalingrad, Fiebig was commanding of the VIII Air Corps (German: Fliegerkorps VIII) in the Stalingrad sector. When the 250,000-strong 6th Army was encircled in that city in November 1942, Fiebig was tasked with supplying it from the air, despite protesting to the commander of the 6th Army, Generaloberst Friedrich Paulus that such an operation was not feasible. Fiebig appealed to the commander of the Luftwaffe 4th Air Fleet (German: Luftflotte 4, LF4), Generaloberst Wolfram Freiherr von Richthofen, who was responsible for all Luftwaffe operations in the southern Soviet Union. Richthofen agreed with Fiebig's assessment, and urged senior generals to order a breakout by the 6th Army. His pleas to Generaloberst Maximilian von Weichs at Army Group B, and even to the commander-in-chief of the Luftwaffe, Reichsmarshall Hermann Göring were rebuffed, and despite his good relationship with Adolf Hitler, no-one would allow him to express his opposition to the Führer himself. On 23 December 1942, Fiebig was awarded the Oak Leaves to his Knight's Cross of the Iron Cross.

Ultimately, Fiebig's assessment regarding Stalingrad was proven correct; the necessary tonnages could not be flown in by the available transport aircraft, and the 6th Army ran out of ammunition and food in early February 1943, after which it surrendered.

In January 1943, Richthofen realised that elements of the German 17th Army were in danger of being encircled on the Taman Peninsula on the Black Sea, and tasked Fiebig with establishing an ad hoc airlift command to protect and supply the 17th Army while it was evacuated back to the Crimea. In a very short time Fiebig had assembled Air Transport Mission Crimea (German: Lufttransporteinsatz Krim), and had established a network of airfields for it to operate from.

Drawing one squadron from each of VIII Fliegerkorps' wings, he established new reconnaissance, bomber, fighter and transport wings and groups. These new formations immediately began operating, evacuating at least 50,000 soldiers over the next month, and supplying the remaining troops with an average of 500 tons of fuel and ammunition each day, protected by its own fighters. Fiebig's establishment and operation of Air Transport Mission Crimea has been used as an example of the flexibility demonstrated by the Luftwaffe during World War II.

In late 1943, Fiebig was commanding Luftwaffe Command South-East (German: Luftwaffenkommando Südost), headquartered in Salonika in Axis-occupied Greece. In addition to Flak units, his command included the Luftwaffe Mission in Bulgaria.

From 1 September 1944 to 31 January 1945 Fiebig was in the reserve at the Air Force High Command. From 1 February to 12 April 1945 he again acted as Commanding General of the 2nd Air Corps, and then from 12 April to 8 May as commander of the Northeast Air Force Command.

== Execution ==
On 8 May 1945 Fiebig was initially captured by the British, but was transferred to Yugoslavia on 6 February 1946, where he was found guilty in a war crime trial on 10 September and sentenced to death. The judgment was enforced on 23 October 1947.

== Awards ==
- Iron Cross (1914) 2nd and 1st Class
- Clasp to the Iron Cross (1939)
  - 2nd Class (18 September 1939)
  - 1st class (3 May 1940)
- German Cross in Gold on 4 May 1942 as Generalleutnant and Nakfü 2/VIII. Fliegerkorps (Note: Nakfü is the abbreviation of Führer der Nahkampfverbände—leader of the close air support units.)
- Knight's Cross of the Iron Cross with Oak Leaves
  - Knight's Cross on 8 May 1940 as Oberst and Geschwaderkommodore of Kampfgeschwader 4 "General Wever"
  - 168th Oak Leaves on 23 December 1942 as Generalleutnant and commanding general of the VIII. Fliegerkorps

== Notes ==
Military offices
Preceded by none	Commander of Kampfgeschwader 4; 1 September 1939 – 10 May 1940	Succeeded by Oberst Hans-Joachim Rath
Preceded by none	Commander of 1st Air Division (1942-1945); 12 April 1942 – 6 June 1942	Succeeded by General Alfred Schlemm
Preceded by Generalfeldmarschall Wolfram Freiherr von Richthofen	Commander of 8th Air Corps; 1 July 1942 – 21 May 1943	Succeeded by General der Flieger Hans Seidemann
Preceded by Generalleutnant Alexander Holle	Commander of 10th Air Corps; 22 May 1943 – 1 September 1944	Succeeded by disbanded
Preceded by General Otto Hoffmann von Waldau	Commander of Luftwaffenkommando Südost; 22 May 1943 – 1 September 1944	Succeeded by General Stefan Fröhlich
Preceded by General Stefan Fröhlich	Commander of 2nd Air Corps; 1 February 1945 – 12 April 1945	Succeeded by Luftwaffenkommando Nordost
Preceded by 2nd Air Corps	Commander of Luftwaffenkommando Nordost; 12 April 1945 – 8 May 1945	Succeeded by none
