= 1st Air Division (Germany) =

Division of the German Luftwaffe

1st Air Division (1. Flieger-Division) was one of the primary divisions of the German Luftwaffe in World War II.

== Commanders ==
- Oberst Hugo Sperrle, 1 April 1934
- Generalleutnant Ulrich Grauert, 1 July 1938 – 24 October 1939
- General Martin Fiebig, 12 April 1942
- General Alfred Schlemm, 1 July 1942
- Generalleutnant Hermann Plocher, 1 October 1942 – 31 October 1942
- General Alfred Bülowius, 1 November 1942
- Generalmajor Otto Zech, 17 January 1943
- General Paul Deichmann, 26 June 1943
- Generalmajor Robert Fuchs, 7 November 1943
