= Rozumice =

- Interactive map of Rozumice
- Location within Poland
- Coordinates: 50°1′N 17°59′E
- Country: Poland
- Voivodeship: Opole
- County: Głubczyce
- Gmina: Kietrz

Area
  - Total: 8.84 km^{2} (3.41 sq mi)

Population (2007)
  - Total: 332
  - Density: 37.6/km^{2} (97.3/sq mi)
- Time zone: UTC+1 (CET)
  - Summer (DST): UTC+2 (CEST)
- Area code: +48 77
- Car plates: OGL

Rozumice [rɔzuˈmit͡sɛ] (German Rösnitz) is a village in the community of Gmina Kietrz, in Głubczyce County, Opole Voivodeship, in south-western Poland, close to the Czech border.

== Early history ==
There is evidence from stone-age and bronze-age tools found locally of a settlement here from at least since the stone-age. The latest archaeological finds confirm that there has been a settlement in Rozumice since the latest palaeolithic phase.

== Village history ==
In 1523 the principality of Jägerndorf, under the House of Hohenzollern, which includes the village, was bought by George, Margrave of Brandenburg-Ansbach, also a zealous Lutheran. From 1557 onwards the community bought the title deeds for their houses, the land they farmed and finally freed themselves from serfdom and most tithes. A new replacement church was built. With the ascension of Ferdinand II, Holy Roman Emperor in 1617 and the resurgence of the Roman Catholic faith in the region, the village soon became embroiled in a long period of war, which was to rage with bitter disputes and retributions for 30 years. Being near an important old trade route and several state boundaries there were frequent wars in the area and as the many battle fortunes in the area waxed and waned, the villagers were forced to pay taxes to fund the war, billet the occupying or passing army and provide men to fight to which ever side was then in ascendancy at the time. This state of affairs went on right up to World War I. The Protestant church was locked in 1628. In the Leobschütz area during the succeeding period, only two villages, Rösnitz and Steuberwitz, were not converted back to Catholicism, at some considerable personal cost. The villagers were subjected to extreme pressures over a long period to convert back, but managed to withstand and remain Protestant.

The earliest documented record of a school in the village dates from 1575.

== Century of refugees ==
With the 1st Ukrainian Front advances on Upper Silesia under Marshal Ivan Konev getting ever closer, on 24 March 1945 at 10:00 pm the villagers left their village with their possessions piled on horse-drawn wagons. Over some six weeks they moved west until turned around and made to return. After they left, fierce fighting went on in and around Rösnitz for a while, the church was bombed and many of the houses were destroyed, possession of the village changed four times, leaving behind 50 disabled tanks when a general surrender was declared on 8 May. On their return the villagers were made to clear up the aftermath of the fighting. Two months later Poles from Eastern Galicia were re-settled in the village, and the villagers had to vacate their homes to make way for them, work and harvest the fields under their directions. Between 5 and 14 July 1946, under the Allied Forces directive, the original German villagers were deported to the west with no more than 50 kg of food and possessions apiece. Thus came the final end of a 420-year battle to remain true to the Protestant faith, to be supplanted by the new Roman Catholic occupants.

== Present day ==
Polish and Ukrainian expellees from the Kresy regions of interwar Poland which had been annexed by the Soviet Union were settled here and the village renamed to Rozumice. The present Polish villagers keep in close contact with the former German speaking residents, who have been visiting the village regularly since the late 1980s and the fall of communism in Poland. Although initially the former German residents were wary of visiting the village they were won over by the hospitality of the Poles.

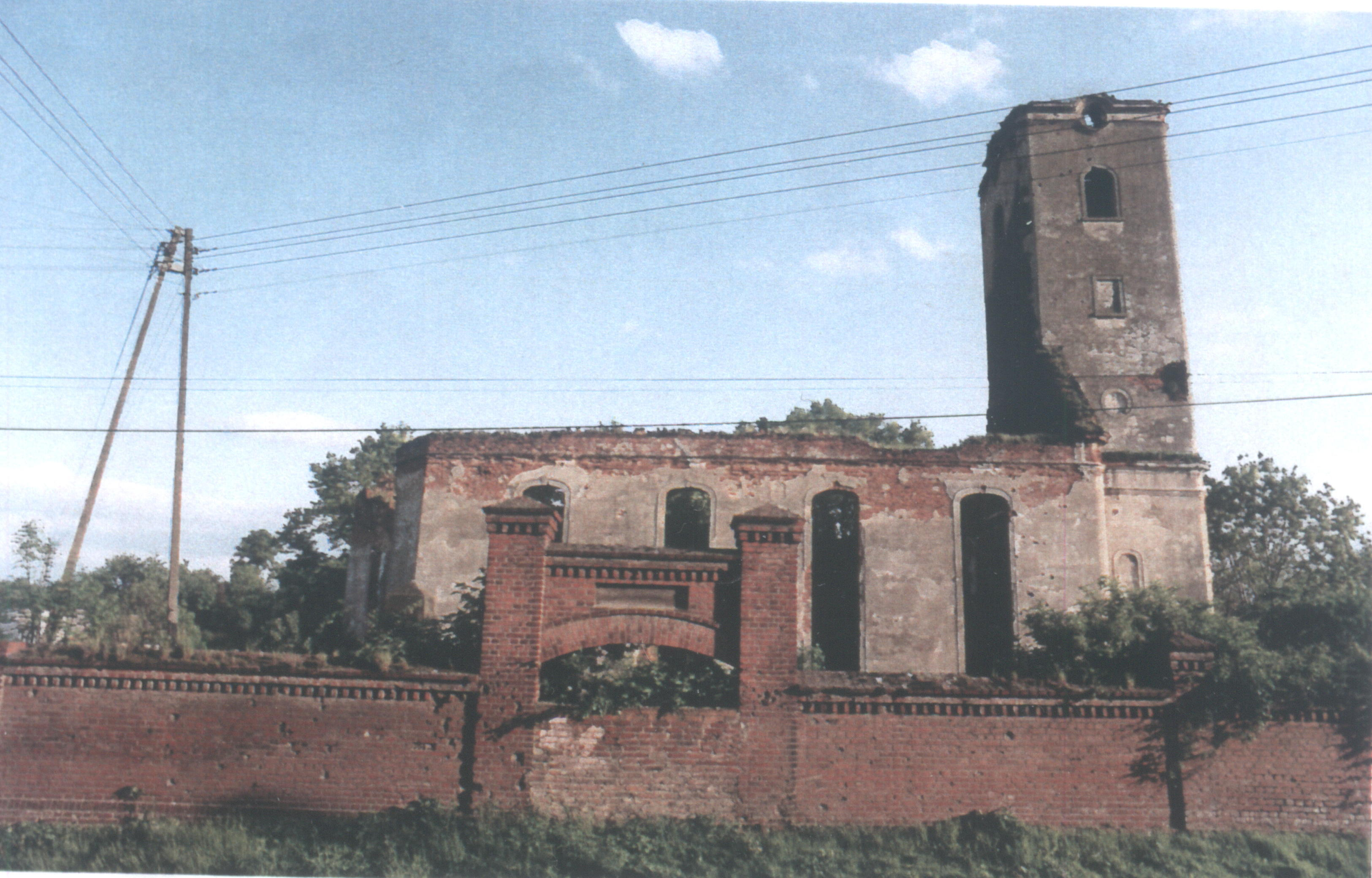
Ruins of an Evangelical church in Rozumice

A cooperative effort by both the former and present inhabitants of the place has resulted in a joint proposal for a Polish-German Museum on the history of the village. The president of Poland Lech Kaczyński sent a letter supporting the proposal and congratulating them on their important role in furthering friendly Polish-German relationships.

== Notable residents ==
- Martin Fiebig (1891–1947), Luftwaffe (Nazi air force) general
