= Werder (Havel) =

- Town
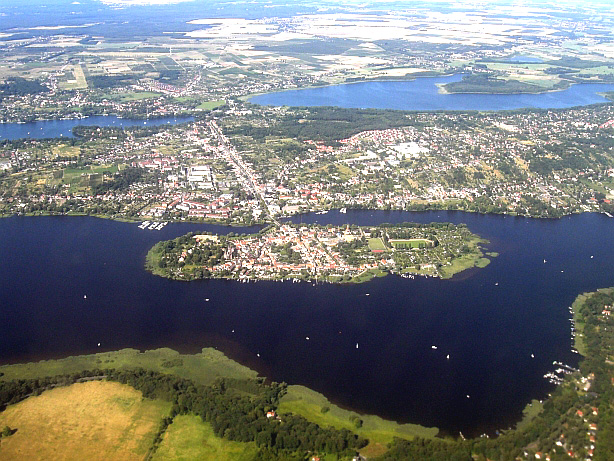
- City island in the River Havel, with Großer Plessower See in the background

- Coat of arms

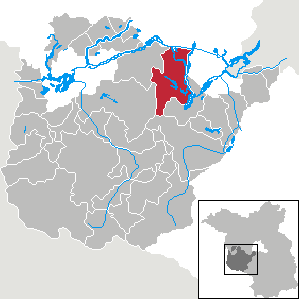
- Location of Werder (Havel) within Potsdam-Mittelmark district
- Interactive map of Werder (Havel)
- Location within Germany Location within Brandenburg
- Coordinates: 52°23′N 12°56′E
- Country: Germany
- State: Brandenburg
- District: Potsdam-Mittelmark
- Subdivisions: 8 Ortsteile

Government
  - Mayor (2022–30): Manuela Saß (CDU)

Area
  - Total: 117.05 km^{2} (45.19 sq mi)
- Elevation: 31 m (102 ft)

Population (2025-12-31)
  - Total: 27,064
  - Density: 231.22/km^{2} (598.85/sq mi)
- Time zone: UTC+01:00 (CET)
  - Summer (DST): UTC+02:00 (CEST)
- Postal codes: 14542
- Dialling codes: 03327
- Vehicle registration: PM
- Website: www.werder-havel.de

Werder (Havel) (German pronunciation: [ˈvɛʁdɐ]; official name derived from Werder an der Havel ("Werder upon Havel"), colloquially just Werder) is a town in the state of Brandenburg, Germany, located on the Havel river in the Potsdam-Mittelmark district, west of the state's capital Potsdam.

Werder is a nationally recognized Erholungsort – a government designation given to regions of Germany that have been recognized and must be continuously re-certified as having air and climate qualities which provide a healthful environment to visitors. Werder is also famous for hosting a Cherry Blossom Festival, the Baumblütenfest, every May.

== Etymology ==
The Werder municipal area stretches along the banks of the Havel, a tributary of the Elbe, and the town's oldest quarter is located on an island in the river. Hence the name, as the landscape term Werder (like Wörth in Upper German) means "river island".

== History ==
Werder has several different specific mentions in the ancient historical records of Berlin, which lies 40 km (25 mi) north east. The city "Werdere" is mentioned in 1317, "Wehrder" in 1450 and in its present spelling in 1580. However, in its southwest end pieces of ancient broken glass have been discovered, and on its south end are remains of what may have been an Early Medieval Slavic castle wall.

The coin-shaped city island in the Havel river is mentioned as being accessible via a bridge in a 1317 deed, when the ministeriales of the Brandenburg margraves had to sell the estates to the monks of nearby Lehnin Abbey. The town was devastated by Swedish troops during the Thirty Years' War.

During World War II and prior thereto an airfield existed in the north of the city which, together with an adjacent park, was used during the war as an airplane pilot training area. Werder was the base of Luftwaffe general Karl Koller during the Battle of Berlin. After the end of the war, Soviet troops were stationed in this area of the city. The last Russian troops departed in 1993, three years after the reunification of Germany.

== Demography ==
Development of population since 1875 within the current Boundaries (Blue Line: Population; Dotted Line: Comparison to Population development in Brandenburg state; Grey Background: Time of Nazi Germany; Red Background: Time of communist East Germany)

Recent Population Development and Projections (Population Development before Census 2011 (blue line); Recent Population Development according to the Census in Germany in 2011 (blue bordered line); Official projections for 2005-2030 (yellow line); for 2017-2030 (scarlet line); for 2020-2030 (green line)

Werder (Havel): Population development
within the current boundaries (2020)

Year	Pop.	±% p.a.
1875	9,271	—
1890	11,415	+1.40%
1910	12,925	+0.62%
1925	14,342	+0.70%
1939	19,699	+2.29%
1950	20,469	+0.35%
1964	18,250	−0.82%

Year	Pop.	±% p.a.
1971	18,017	−0.18%
1981	18,069	+0.03%
1985	18,159	+0.12%
1990	17,838	−0.36%
1995	19,404	+1.70%
2000	22,218	+2.75%
2005	22,874	+0.58%

Year	Pop.	±% p.a.
2010	23,017	+0.12%
2015	24,856	+1.55%
2016	25,345	+1.97%
2017	25,695	+1.38%
2018	26,184	+1.90%
2019	26,412	+0.87%
2020	26,662	+0.95%

== Politics ==
Since 1990, Werder's mayor has been Werner Große of the Christian Democratic Union (CDU), who had previously functioned as the city's deputy. The 29-seat town council (SVV), meets every two months, to represent the interests of the citizenry. The council is composed of 17 CDU members, 4 Social Democratic Party members, 3 Action Free Citizens members and various other unaffiliated city delegates.

There are a number of committees with appointed citizens delegates who consult with the town council. The central committee, which exists under chairmanship of the mayor, deals with finances in consultation with an auditing board of examiners. The committee for social policy, education, culture and sport, oversees area schools. There is also a special committee responsible for town development, construction and living conditions, which has significant influence over the city's infrastructure.

== Economics ==
Although at one time known for its wine production and fishing industry, both pursuits declined during the 18th century. From early times, the monks of the Cistercian monastery of Lehnin cultivated fruit in the region, and Werder is still particularly well known for this endeavor, which is also the foundation for its famous blossoming season festival. The predominant fruits grown in the area are cherries, apples, and strawberries but raspberries, gooseberries, currants, blackberries, apricots, peaches, pears, and plums are also cultivated. Vegetables are also grown, especially tomatoes, the bulk of which are cultivated in local greenhouses.

=== Viticulture ===
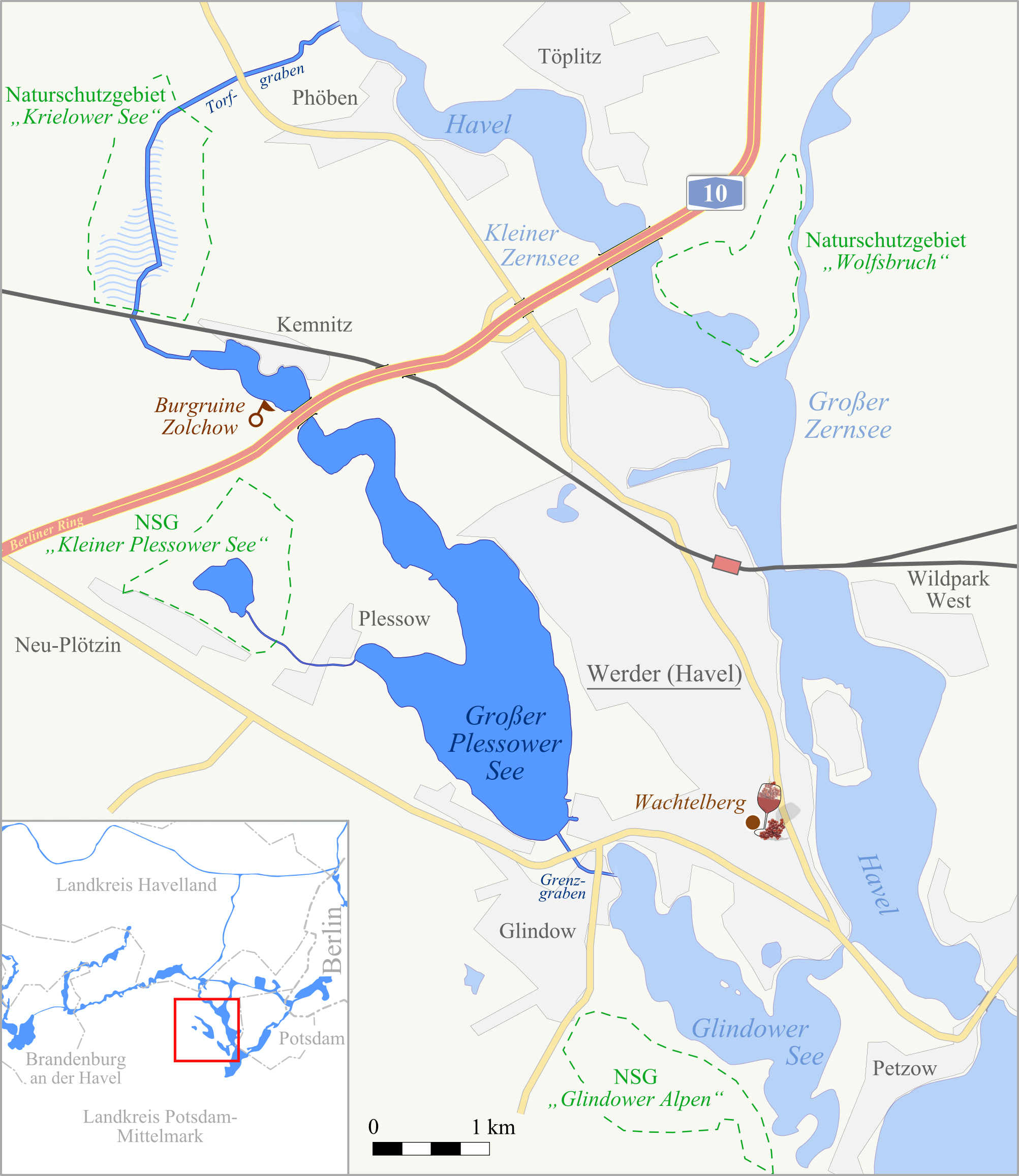
Location of the wineyard in the town

Wine cultivation is the city's second-oldest trade after fishing, brought to this area before 1300 by monks of the Cistercian Order. The wine of the Margraviate of Brandenburg (Mark Brandenburg) was by the end of the 13th century one the region's most important exports to eastern and northern Europe. The Hohenzollern dynasty that came from Franconia to Brandenburg, made the wine of the Brandenburg Mark part of its court. Until the death of the Great Elector, the wine was drunk in his residence. The first Wine Master Order of Brandenburg was founded in 1598 by the Elector Johann Georg, and at that time it was reported that Havel would also have vineyards just like the ones in the Moselle. However, the viticulture in this area was not trouble-free. The winters could be extremely hard on occasion, when many vines would get frostbite. This happened in the winter of 1739/40, when the frost lasted until June. In the first half of the 18th century, grapes were grown on more than 100 hectares in Werder. The vines at that time were Weißer Elbling, Weißer and Roter Schönedel, and Rotfranke grapes. Nevertheless, more red wine than white wine was grown. The Werderaner Wachtelberg (Quail's Mountain) is the oldest winegrowing location beyond the island of Werder. On the island, vineyards were located on the Muhlenberg hill. The vineyards existed before their envelopment by fruit trees, especially apricots and peaches. The fruits were transported with great care in the Obsttienen (small wooden transport containers).

In 1887 it was reported that 2 vineyards remained. Wine cultivation ended when the last vines in Werder were frostbitten in the winter of 1955/56. In 1985 the Fruit Production Cooperative of Werder was founded on the Werderaner Wachtelberg, with a vineyard covering 4.8 hectares. Today about 30,000 vines grow there on nearly 7 hectares of land. Dornfelder, Regent, Saphira, and Müller-Thurgau grapes are grown here, among other varieties. Within the scope of the Federal Garden Show (Bundesgartenschau) in Potsdam, Wine Teaching Paths were established at the Werderaner Wachtelberg. Today 38 red and 40 white wine varieties are grown here. The Werderaner Wachtelberg vineyard lies at a latitude of 52 degrees and 22 minutes north, far to the north of the typical winegrowing areas in Europe. In 1991 the vineyard was given Großlagenfreie Einzellage classification in the Weinanbaugebiet Saale-Unstrut (winegrowing area on the Saale and Unstrut rivers) and was also recognised by the EU. It is at the most northern registered position for quality-tested wine cultivation (QbA) in Europe and the world.

== Notable people ==
- Anna Simson (1835–1916), women's rights activist
- Karl Hagemeister (1848–1933), landscape painter
- Burglinde Pollak (* 1951), pentathlete
- Brigitte Ahrenholz (1952–2018), rower
- Dieter Timme (1956–2024), football player
- Bruno Kramm (* 1967), musician
- Adolf Damaschke (1865–1935), politician and economist, lived in Werder since 1907

== Gallery ==
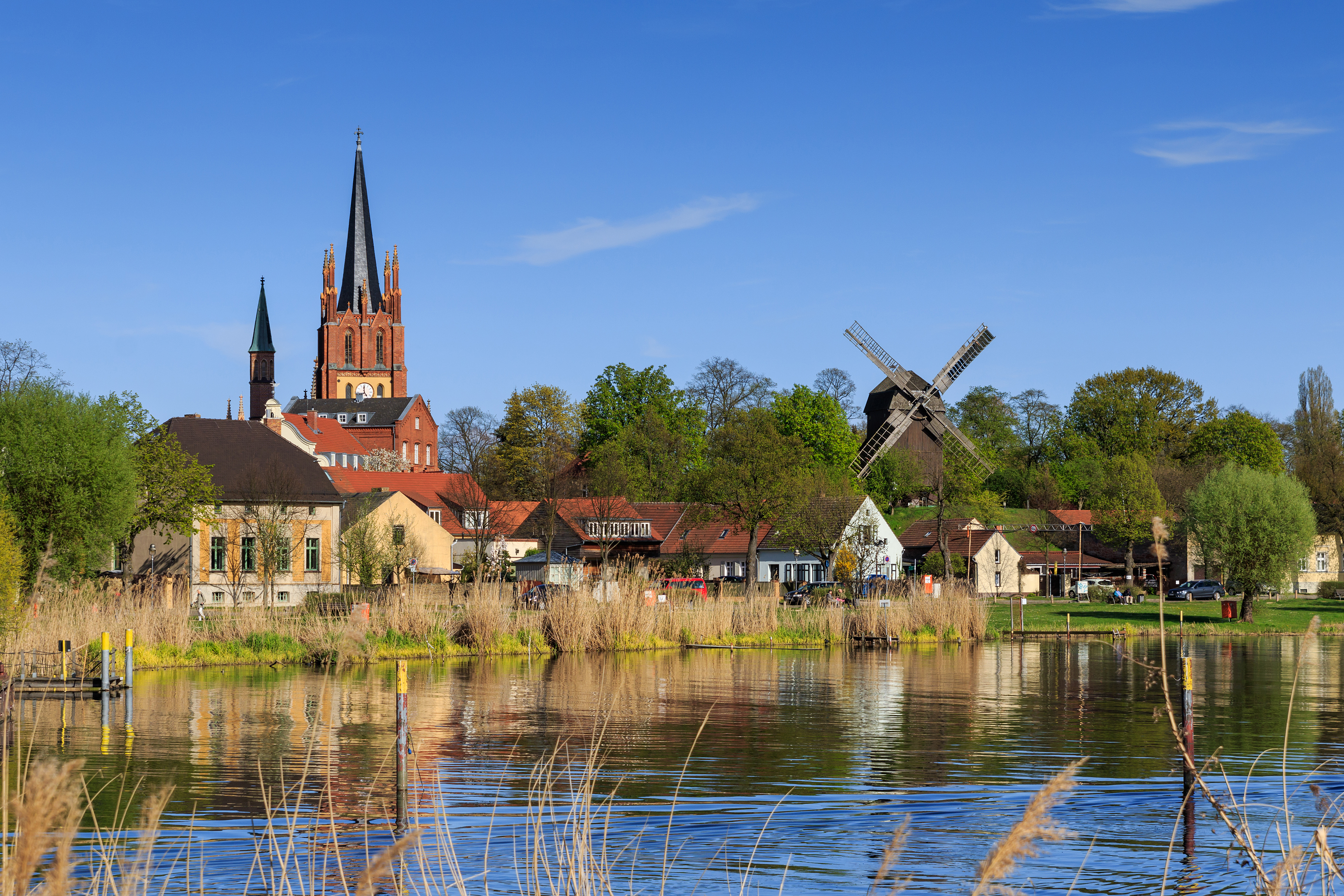
The Holy Spirit Church and "Goat's windmill" on the shore of the Havel

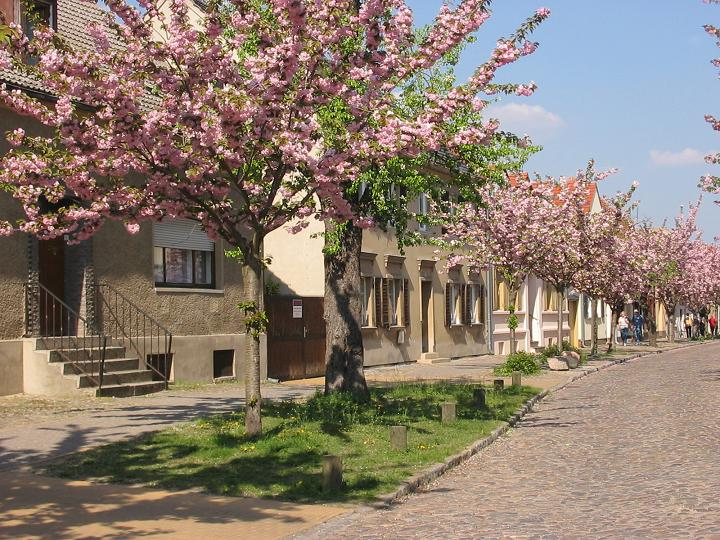
Street in bloom on Werder's river island at the end of April, during the blossom festival

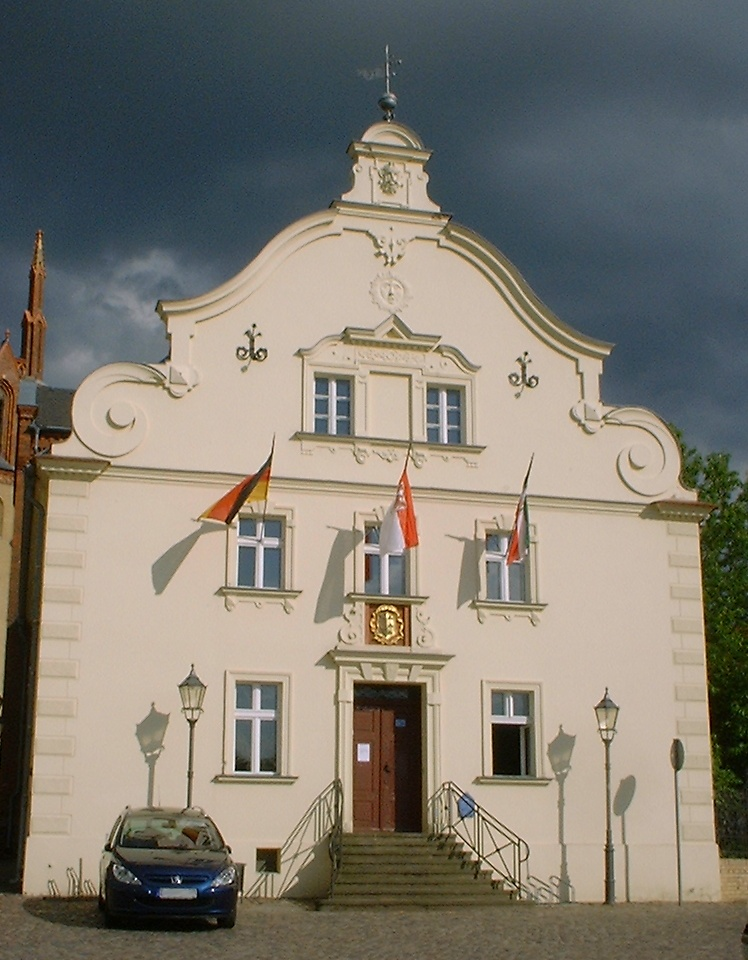
Old town hall

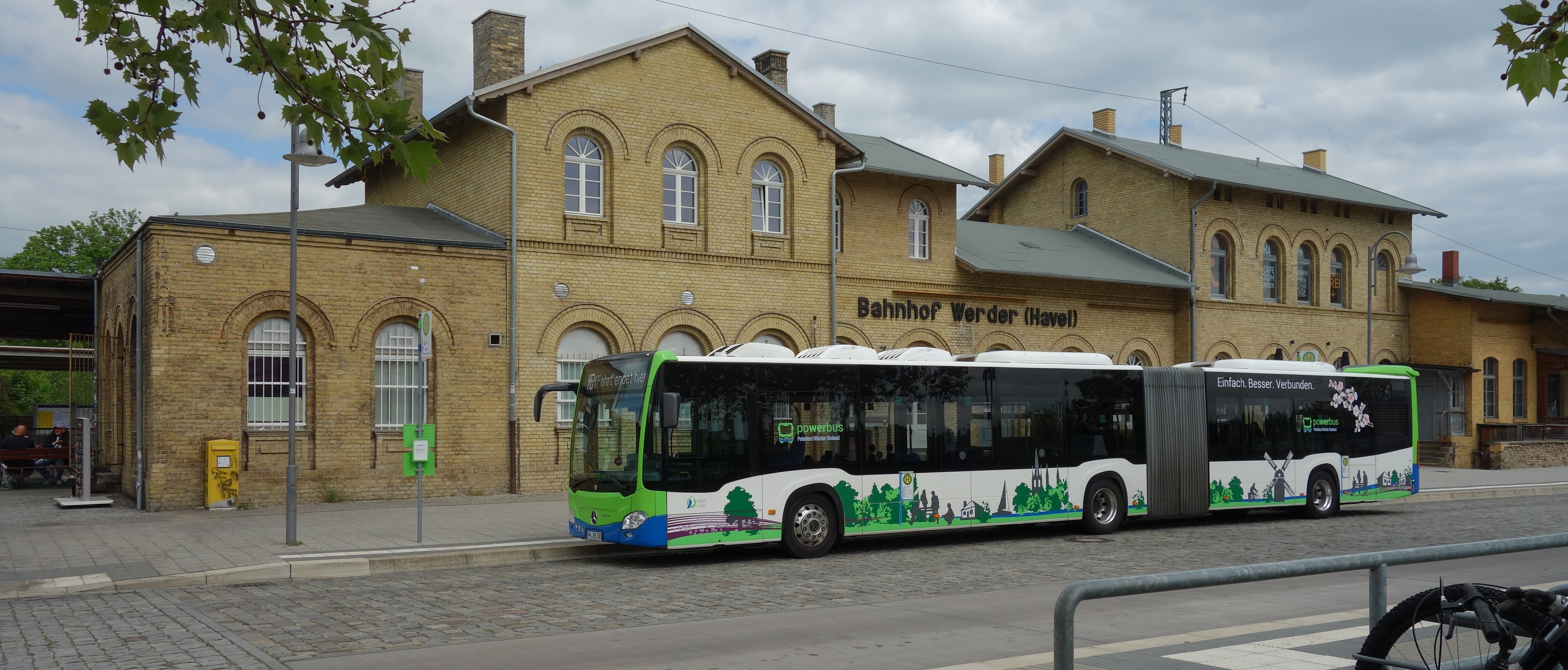
Train station with bus stop

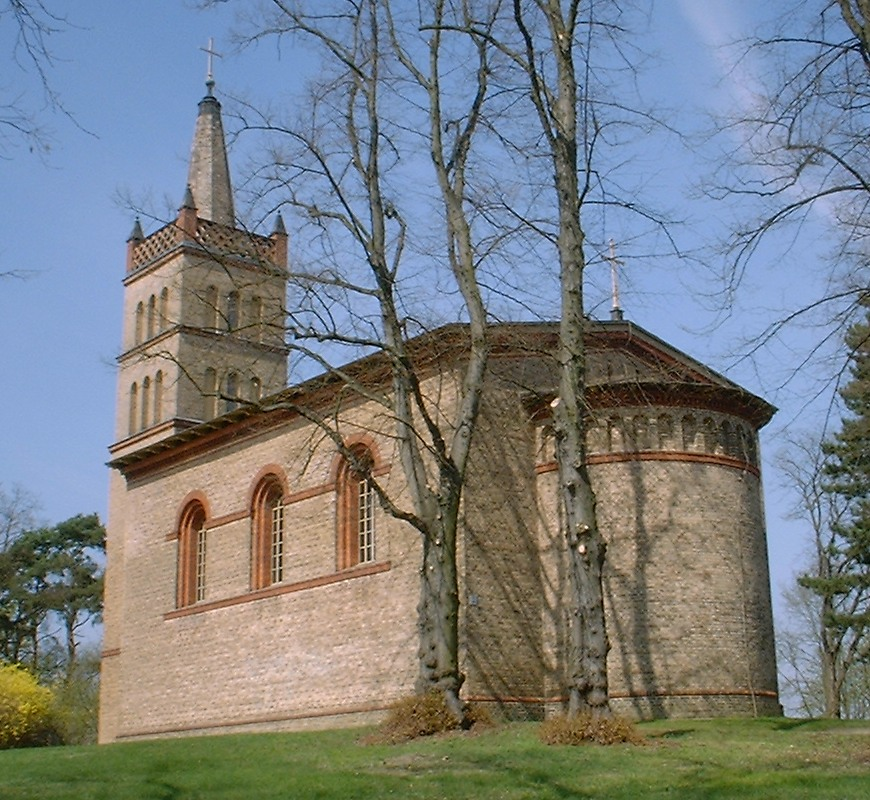
Church in Petzow

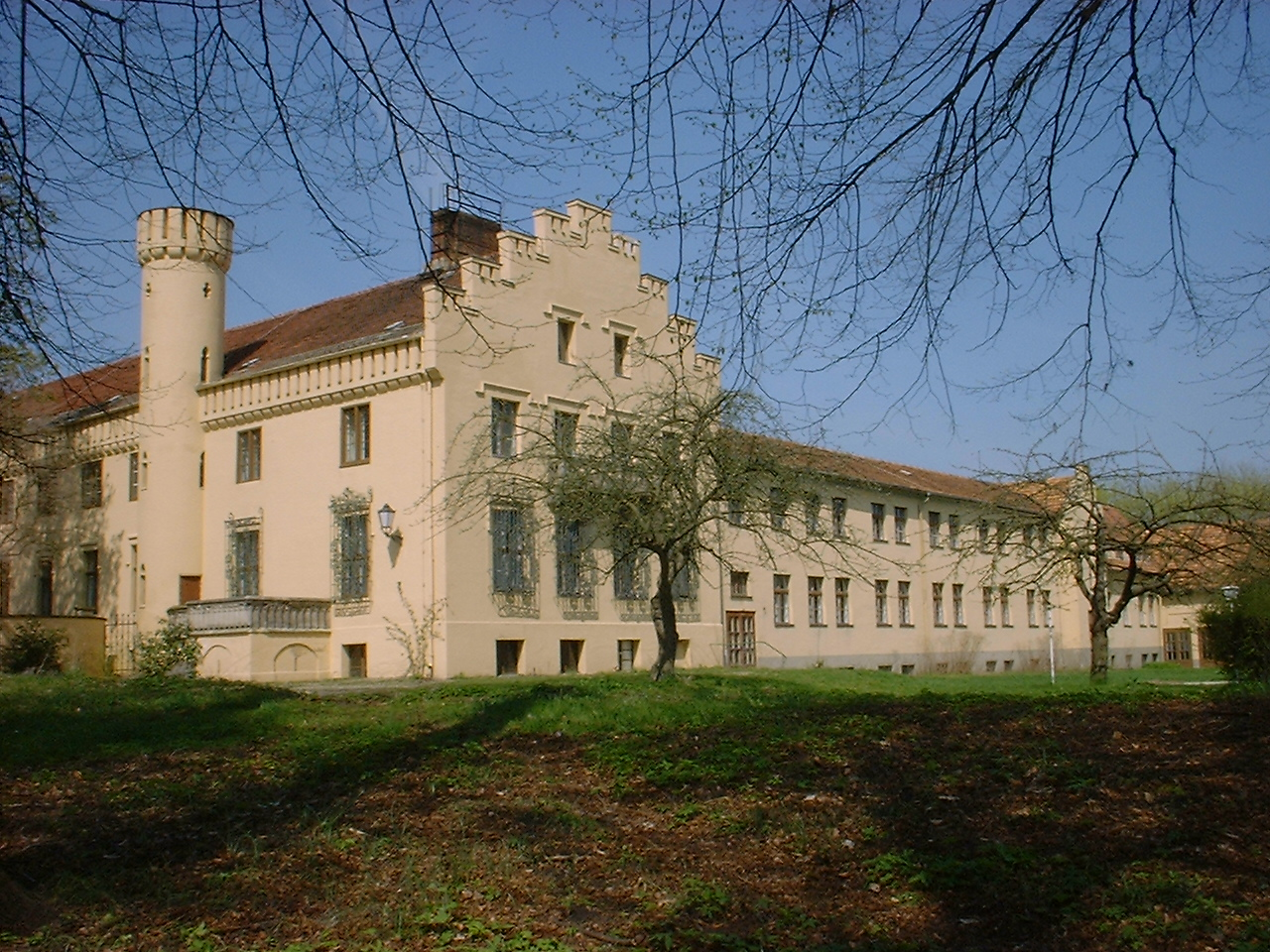
Petzow Castle

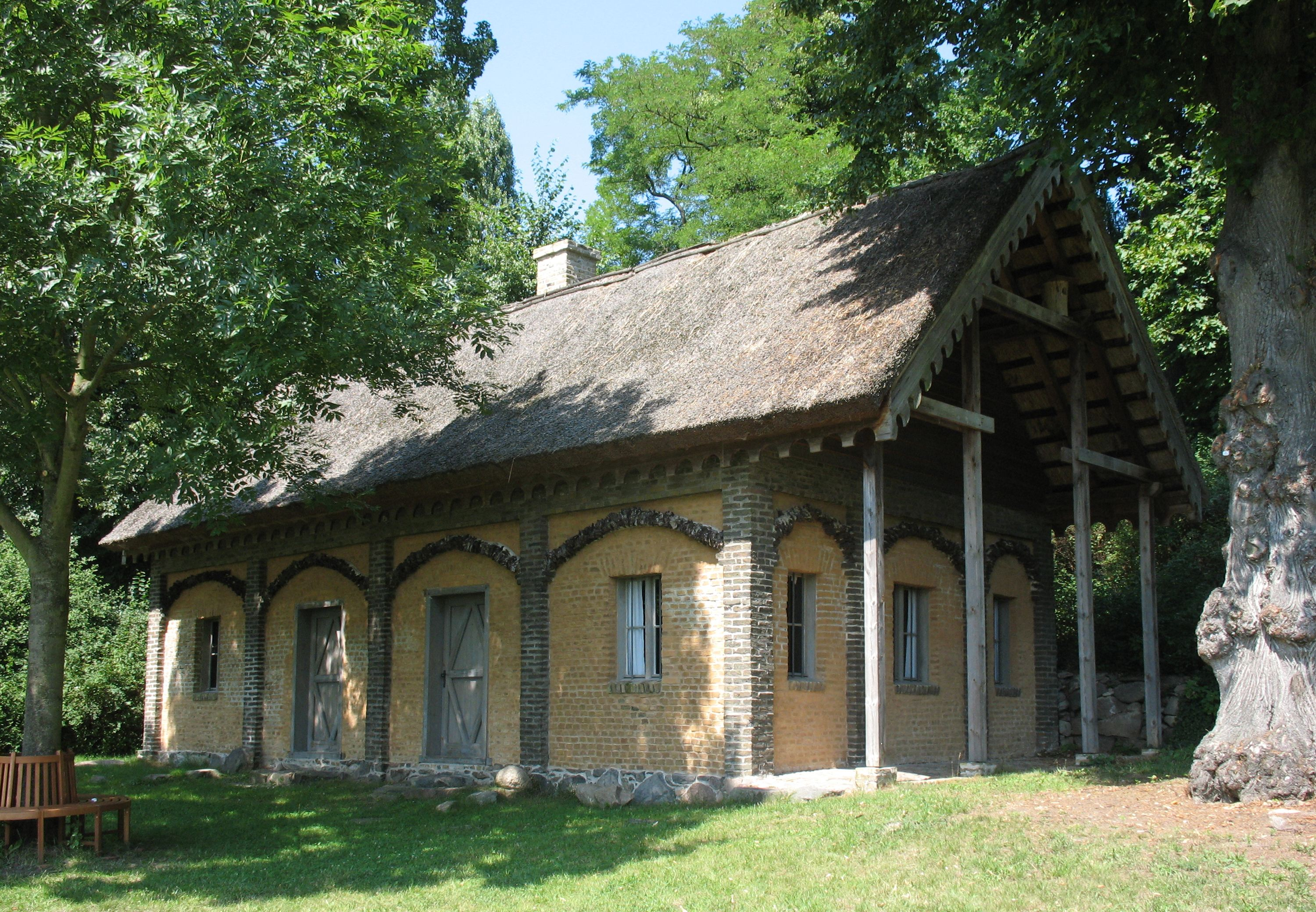
Former wash house in Petzow

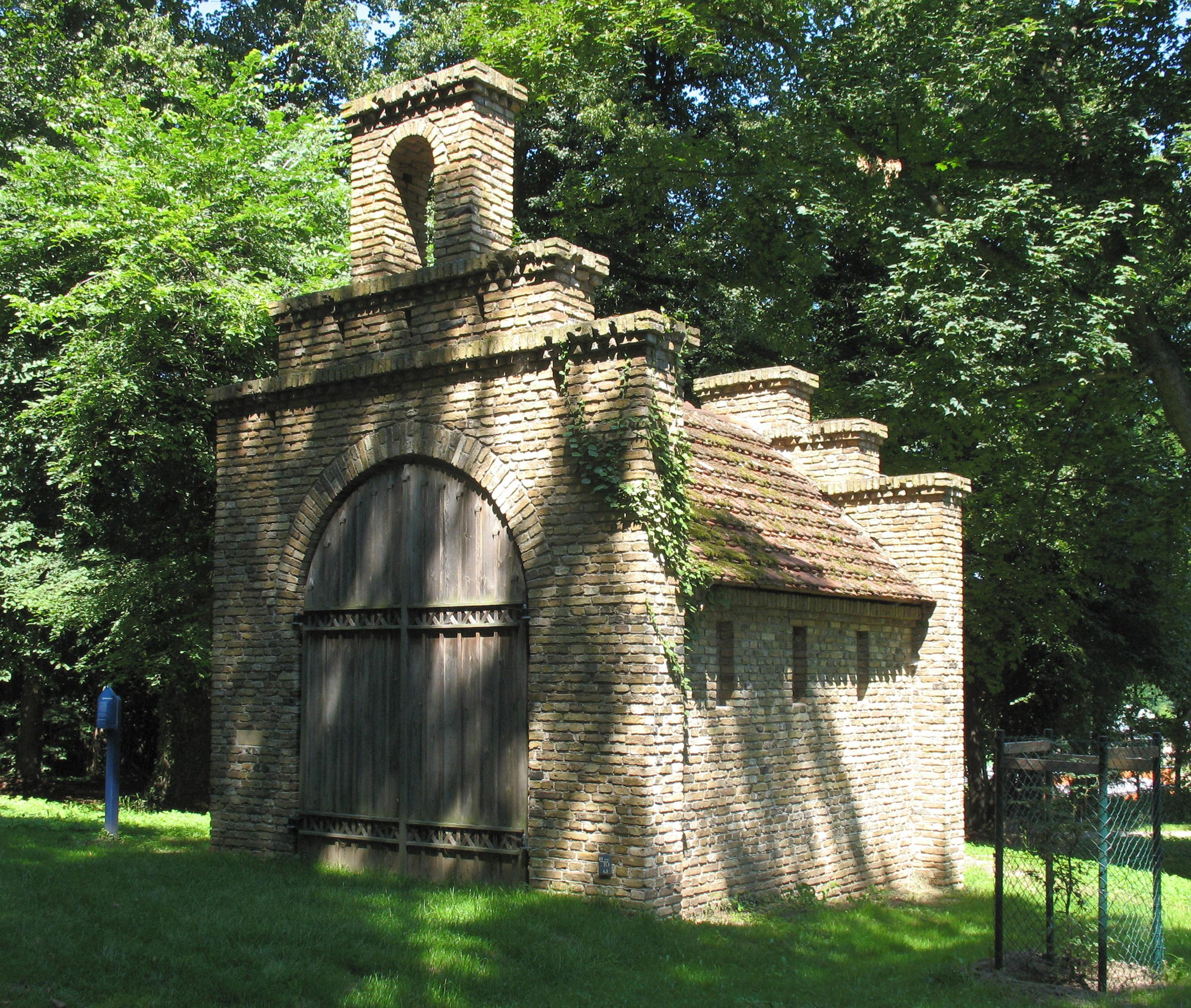
Former fire engine house in Petzow

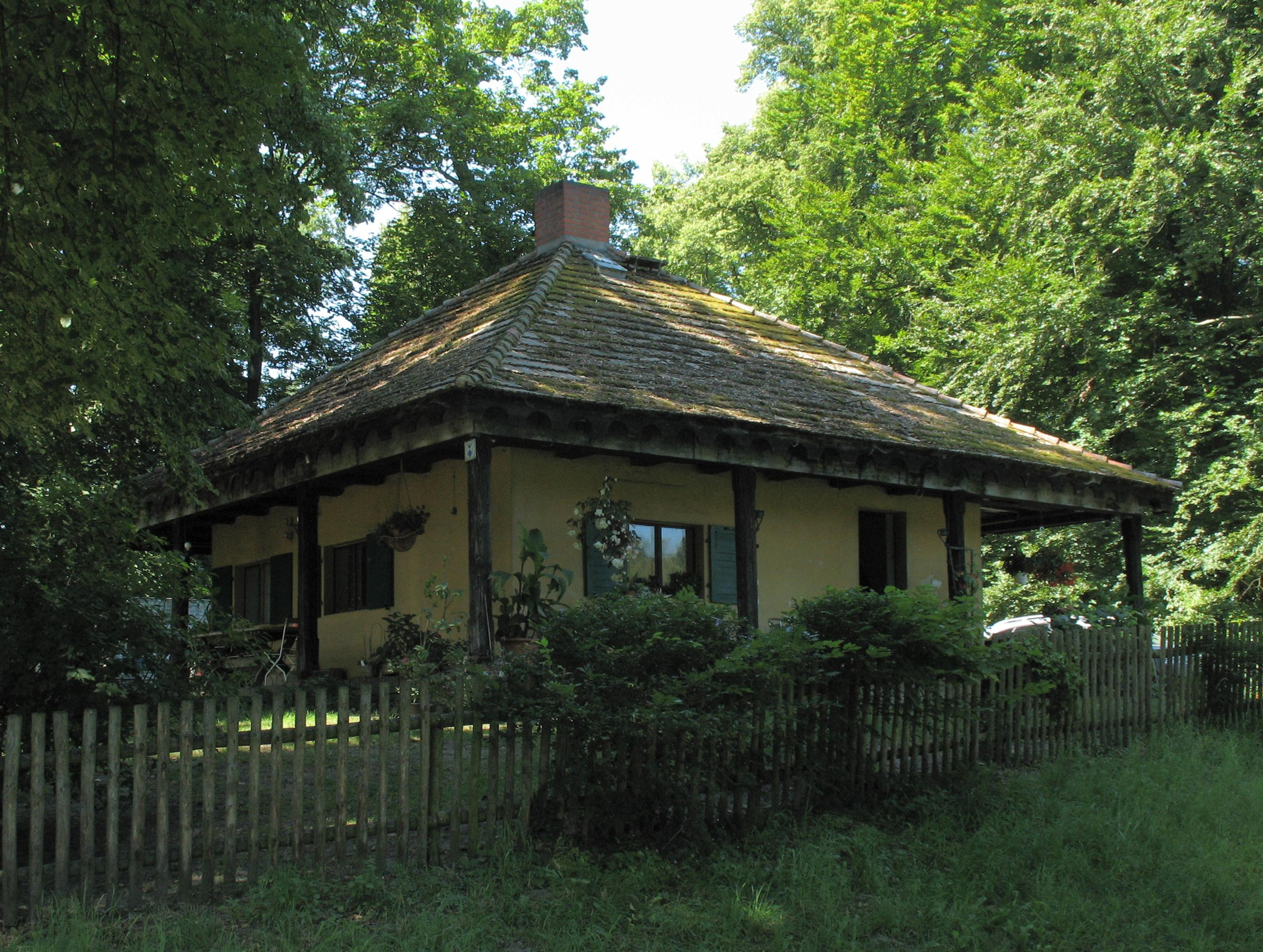
Fisherman's house in Petzow

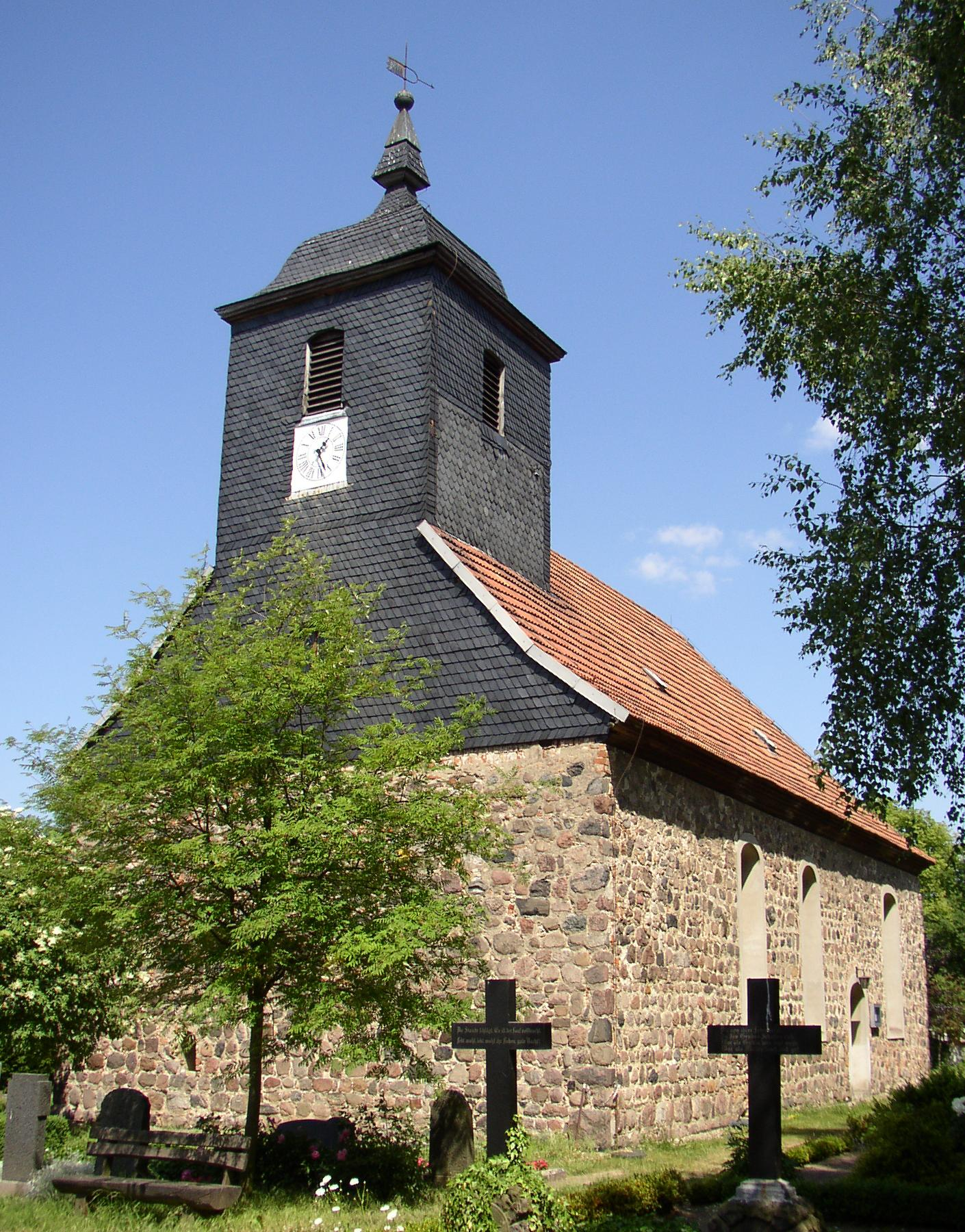
Church in Plötzin

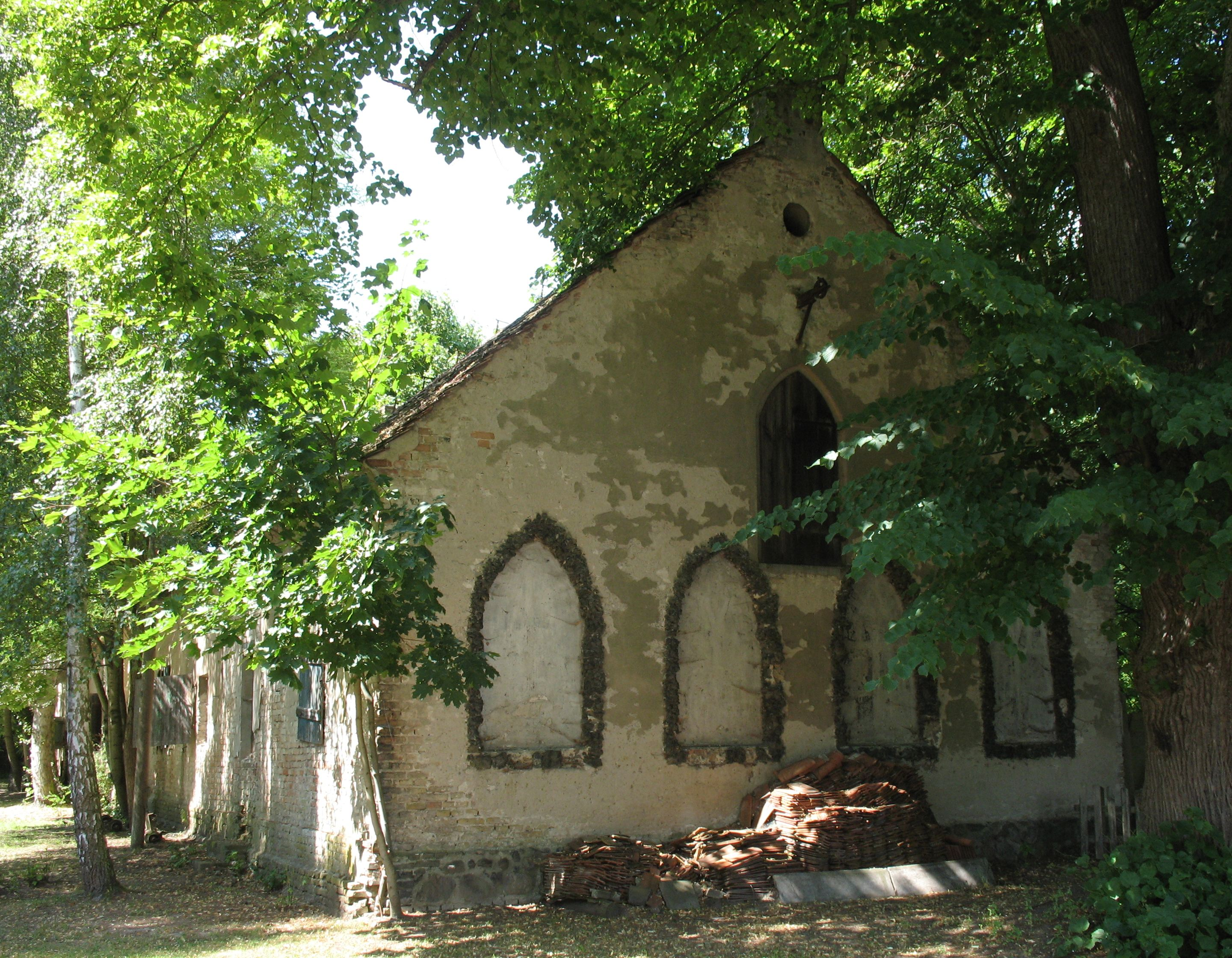
Former brickyard Löcknitz

== International relations ==
=== Twin towns — Sister cities ===
Werder is twinned with:

- Oppenheim, Rhineland-Palatinate, Germany
- Almdorf, Schleswig-Holstein, Germany
- Hjørring, Denmark
- Tczew, Poland
- Biržai, Lithuania
- Muan-gun, South Korea

== See also ==
- Großer Plessower See
