= Großer Plessower See =

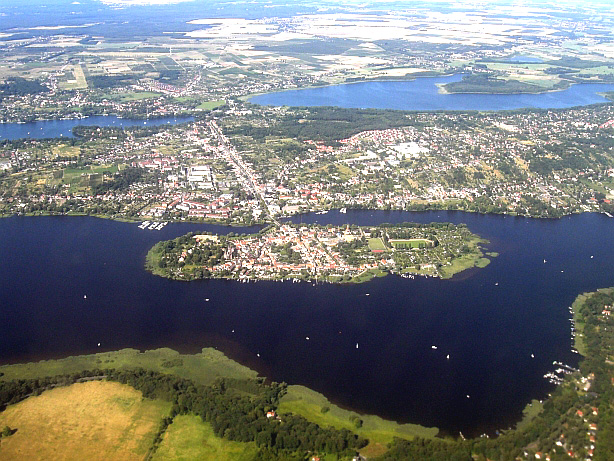

- Location within Germany
- Location: Brandenburg
- Coordinates: 52°22′51″N 12°53′55″E
- Basin countries: Germany
- Max. length: 5.11 km (3.18 mi)
- Max. width: 1,325 m (4,347 ft)
- Surface area: 3.22 km^{2} (1.24 sq mi)
- Average depth: 4.5 m (15 ft)
- Max. depth: 16 m (52 ft)
- Water volume: 20,000,000 m^{3} (710,000,000 cu ft)
- Surface elevation: 24 m (79 ft)

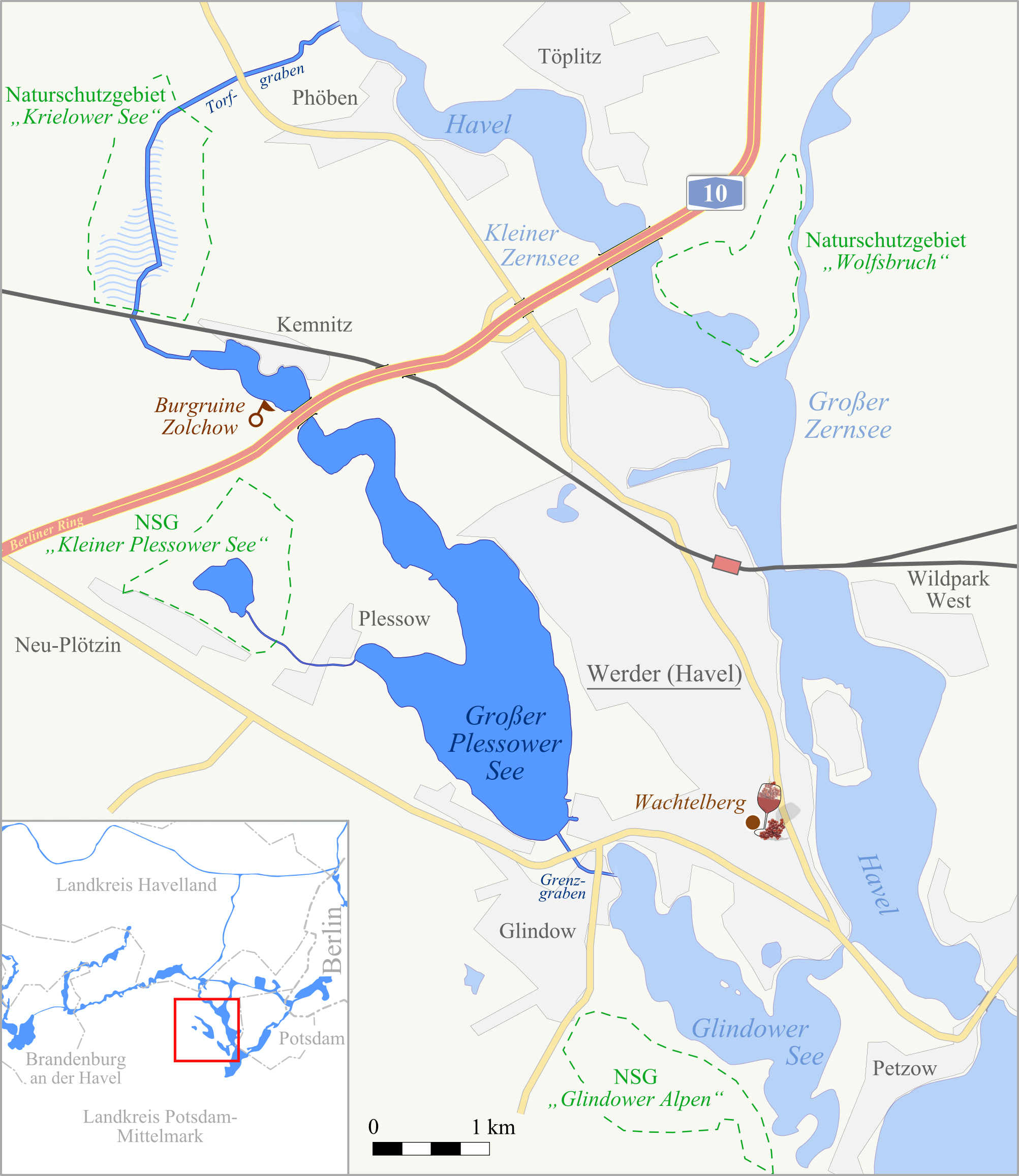

Großer Plessower See is a German lake in the town of Werder, in Brandenburg. At an elevation of 24 m, its surface area is 3.22 km², its maximum length 5,11 km and, at its widest, is 1325 m.
