= Karl Koller (general) =

German Nazi military Air Staff officer (1898–1951)

General Karl Koller
- Koller in 1943
- Born: 22 February 1898; Glonn, Kingdom of Bavaria, German Empire
- Died: 22 December 1951 (aged 53); Glonn, Bavaria, West Germany
- Military career
- Allegiance: German Empire; Weimar Republic; Nazi Germany
- Branch: Luftstreitkräfte; Luftwaffe
- Service years: 1914–1945
- Rank: General der Flieger
- Commands: Chief of the Luftwaffe General Staff
- Conflicts: World War I World War II
- Awards: Knight's Cross of the Iron Cross
- Other work: Der Letzte Monat (memoirs)

Karl Koller (22 February 1898 – 22 December 1951) was a German General der Flieger and the Chief of the General Staff of Nazi Germany's Luftwaffe during World War II which is the Air Force branch controlled by the German Wehrmacht alongside the Wehrmacht Heer and Kriegsmarine.

== Early life ==
Koller was born in Glonn in Bavaria. He enlisted in the army in 1914 and, after infantry service, transferred to aviation. He passed pilot training in 1916, flew in observation and fighter squadrons and was captured by the British in May 1918. After his release in 1919, he served in various police capacities and shifted to the Luftwaffe in 1935. An exemplary officer, he in 1936 graduated valedictorian at the Air War Academy.

== World War II ==
Koller was the Chief of Staff for Hugo Sperrle during the Blitz. For Operation Sealion, the planned invasion of the United Kingdom by the Wehrmacht, Oberstleutnant Koller was to serve as the Operations Officer of Luftflotte 3 in co-ordination with the German 9th Army. Koller became the Chef der Luftwaffenführungsstabes ("Chief of the Luftwaffe Operations Staff") in October 1943, which essentially made him as assistant to the General Staff.

Dissatisfied with Hermann Göring's leadership of the Luftwaffe, Adolf Hitler wanted to replace him with Robert Ritter von Greim. Unable to convince Greim to accept the role, Hitler forced Göring to sack the Chef des Generalstabs der Luftwaffe ("Chief of the General Staff of the Luftwaffe"), Generalleutnant Werner Kreipe and to replace him provisionally on 13 September 1944 with the stolid Koller, who was officially assigned the position on 12 November. However, Koller was unable to reform the Luftwaffe, which had been mismanaged by Göring and lost air superiority over the skies of Europe. Koller explained the problem of the Luftwaffe in dealing with the other service branches:

In June 1944, in order to counter the many recent attacks on Luftwaffe policy, I took advantage of a small conference at the Obersalzberg to point out the weakness of Luftwaffe armament resources, and voiced my feeling that the Armed Forces High Command, which ought to have supported the Luftwaffe armament program in the interests of the Armed Forces and the nation as a whole, had limited itself to negative criticism. I stated frankly that our top military leaders had simply neglected their duty in this connection.
And with this I had stumbled into a wasps' nest! They refused to consider my arguments and tried to persuade me that Göring would not have countenanced any participation by the Armed Forces High Command in the affairs of the Luftwaffe, that he would have termed it interference and forbidden it. There can be no doubt of the inaccuracy of this contention. To be sure, Göring was not a man to countenance interference, but he certainly would have welcomed constructive support and assistance from the Armed Forces High Command in improving the Luftwaffe's armament situation.

Although Koller supported Göring against the Heer and the Kriegsmarine, he was one of Göring's harshest critics and wrote that "one had the feeling that he [Göring] had no interest in bringing about an atmosphere of smooth cooperation, that he was almost afraid that this would lead to the establishment of a phalanx against himself.

Koller was in Hitler's Führerbunker in Berlin on 20 April 1945 to attend the dictator's final birthday. Although several high-ranking leaders abandoned the city that night, Koller remained behind to represent the Luftwaffe in nearby Werder (Havel). Göring did not acknowledge the Chief of Staff's salute as he left. Koller was represented within the bunker by General Eckhard Christian. Hitler ordered Koller to send his remaining planes and airmen to assist in Felix Steiner's relief of Berlin and explained, "Any commander who holds back his forces will forfeit his life in five hours. You yourself will guarantee with your head that the last man is thrown in". With few troops remaining to him, Steiner was unable to come to the city's defence.

After Alfred Jodl told Koller that Hitler had decided to commit suicide, the Luftwaffe general flew to Obersalzberg at 3:30 a.m. on 23 April to inform Göring in person. In the ensuing power struggle between the Nazi leaders as Hitler's mental state declined, Martin Bormann sent SS troops to place Göring, Koller and Hans Lammers under house arrest at Obersalzberg. Göring dissuaded the SS men from their mission and travelled with him to his castle at Mauterndorf. Koller, who was free at Berchtesgaden, convinced Göring to meet him at Castle Fischhorn at Zell am See, where the US Army took them into custody on 7 May.

== Post-war ==
After the war ended, Koller was imprisoned by the British at Oxford; Charles Lindbergh visited him during this time. Koller was released in December 1947 and returned to Bavaria. In 1949 he published his wartime shorthand diary as the memoir Der letzte Monat (The Last Month, Mannheim), which provided information about Hitler's last days during the Battle of Berlin. Koller also served as the chairman of the Verband Deutscher Soldaten in Bayern.

== Awards and decorations ==
- Flugzeugführer-Abzeichen
- Iron Cross (1914)
  - 2nd Class
  - 1st Class
- Cross of Honor
- Wehrmacht Long Service Award 4th to 1st Class
- Sudetenland Medal with Prague Castle Bar
- Iron Cross (1939)
  - 2nd Class
  - 1st Class
- Wound Badge of 20 July 1944
  - in Black
- Combined Pilots-Observation Badge
- German Cross in Gold (7 February 1944)
- Knight's Cross of the Iron Cross on 10 April 1942 as Oberst im Generalstab (in the General Staff) and Chief of the Generalstaff of Luftflotte 2. (Note: According to Scherzer as chief of the general staff of Luftflotte 3.)

== Film portrayals ==
Koller is portrayed by actor Hans Steinberg in the 2004 German film Downfall (Der Untergang).

== Notes ==
Military offices
Preceded by General der Flieger Werner Kreipe	Chief of the Luftwaffe General Staff; 1 November 1944 – 8 May 1945	Succeeded by Generaloberst Hans-Jürgen Stumpff
