= Ulrich Grauert =

German Luftwaffe general

- Born: 6 March 1889; Berlin, Germany
- Died: 15 May 1941 (aged 52) near Saint-Omer, France
- Burial place: German Military Cemetery in Nampcel, France
- Military career
- Allegiance: German Empire; Weimar Republic; Nazi Germany
- Branch: German Army; Luftwaffe
- Service years: 1909–1941
- Rank: Generaloberst
- Commands: 1st Air Corps
- Conflicts: World War I; World War II; Battle of France; Battle of Britain
- Awards: Knight's Cross of the Iron Cross

Ulrich Grauert (6 March 1889 – 15 May 1941) was a general in the Luftwaffe of Nazi Germany during World War II who commanded 1st Air Corps. He was killed on 15 May 1941 when his Junkers Ju 52 aircraft was shot down by F/Lt Jerzy Jankiewicz and Sgt Wacław Giermer, both flying a Supermarine Spitfire II, from the No. 303 Polish Fighter Squadron near Saint-Omer on the French channel coast.

== Awards ==
- Knight's Cross of the Iron Cross on 29 May 1940 as General der Flieger and Commanding General of the I. Flieger-Korps

Military offices
Preceded by none	Commander of 1st Air Corps; 11 October 1939 – 15 May 1941	Succeeded by General der Flieger Helmuth Förster
