= Bernhard Waber =

- Born: 20 May 1884; Kroměříž, Moravia
- Died: 6 February 1945 (aged 60)
- Cause of death: Executed
- Military career
- Allegiance: Austria-Hungary; First Austrian Republic; Nazi Germany
- Branch: Austro-Hungarian Army; German Air Force
- Rank: Generalmajor (1936); General der Flieger (1942)
- Units: 3rd Army; Army Of The East
- Commands: Air Region VIII; Field Air Region Kiev; Field Air Region Kharkov; Air Region XXX; North Balkan Air Force
- Conflicts: World War I; World War II

Bernhard Anton Waber (20 May 1884 – 6 February 1945) was a general officer of the German Air Force (German: Luftwaffe) in World War II. He was executed by the Nazi regime shortly before the end of the war.

== Career ==
Waber was born on 20 May 1884, in Kroměříž, Moravia.

Joining the Austrian Army in 1907 as a junior officer, he was at the Austrian war academy when World War I broke out. He was immediately attached as a staff officer to an infantry brigade, serving in that capacity for various infantry brigades and being promoted from senior lieutenant to captain in 1915. He then served on the general staff of the 3rd Army on the Eastern Front. In 1918 he was assigned to the general staff of the Army Of The East.

After the war, he continued to serve in the army of the First Austrian Republic, achieving the rank of major general in 1936. He retired that same year. But less than week after the Anschluss (Austria being absorbed into Nazi Germany), he returned to active duty in on 17 March 1938, with the German Air Force. He served during the coming Second World War, mostly as commander of various administrative regions on the Eastern Front.

He was promoted to lieutenant general in 1940, and became commander of the Air Region VIII, based in Breslau, in 1941, shortly before the German invasion of the Soviet Union. In 1941 he was made commander of Field Air Region Kiev, in early 1942 being promoted to the rank of General of Aviators, a three-star rank equivalent to a British or American lieutenant general. Later that year he was moved over to command of Field Air Region Kharkov, and in 1944 to command of Air Region XXX based in Belgrade. Later in 1944 he was given command of the North Balkan Air Force.

== Arrest and execution ==
Here, as the German armed forces entered its death throes (Belgrade itself fell in October 1944), Waber apparently engaged in looting, theft of German government property, and permitting rampant black market activities in his command. Air Force chief Hermann Göring, angry at defeatism and unauthorized retreats in the Air Force, had Waber arrested (on 1 November 1944) along with three other Air Force generals. The other three were tried and acquitted, but Waber was judged guilty of "severe mismanagement in his headquarters and staff and rampant defeatism throughout his region" and given the death penalty. He was executed (either by hanging or firing squad, according to different sources) in Spandau Prison on 6 February 1945.

This incident further weakened Air Force morale, and engendered anger at Göring, who after all had himself engaged in massive looting during the war.
