= Werner Kreipe =

German World War II Luftwaffe General der Flieger

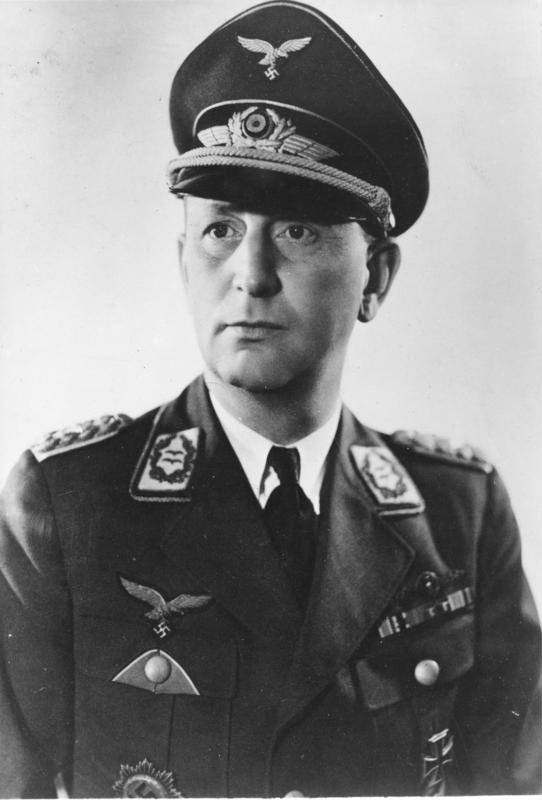
- Kreipe in 1944
- Born: 12 April 1904; Hannover, Province of Hanover, Kingdom of Prussia, German Empire
- Died: 7 September 1967 (aged 63); Badenweiler, Baden-Württemberg, West Germany
- Relatives: ∞ 1930 Christa Freiwald
- Military career
- Allegiance: Weimar Republic; Nazi Germany; West Germany
- Branch: Reichsheer; Luftwaffe; Federal Ministry for Transport
- Service years: 1922–1945
- Rank: Oberleutnant; General der Flieger; Ministerialdirektor
- Commands: III./Kampfgeschwader 2
- Conflicts: World War II
- Awards: Blood Order; Iron Cross; German Cross in Gold

Friedrich Wilhelm Werner Kreipe (12 April 1904 – 7 September 1967) was a German World War II Luftwaffe General der Flieger.

== Life ==
The son of a physician, Kreipe joined the Reichswehr’s 6th Artillery Regiment as an officer candidate after graduating from the Hannover Goethe-Gymnasium in 1922. During his time at the Reichswehr Infantry School in Munich, he participated—on the orders of the training officers—alongside his fellow trainees in Adolf Hitler’s march to the Feldherrenhalle. In 1928, he temporarily left the army to undergo training at the Reichswehr’s secret flying school in Lipetsk, Russia. From 1934 onwards, he participated in a one-year General Staff training course while simultaneously transferring to the newly formed Luftwaffe on 1 October 1934.

=== Luftwaffe career ===
Kreipe held various staff positions until the winter 1939/40, when he was selected or applied for a field role. He joined Kampfgeschwader 2 (Bomber Wing 2) and commanded its III. Gruppe during the Battle of France and the Battle of Belgium. In June 1940 he returned to various staff positions. In December 1941 he was promoted as Chief of Staff, 1st Air Corps (I. Fliegerkorps). In July 1943 he was appointed General der Flieger (General of Fliers). In August 1944 he was promoted to Acting Chief of the Luftwaffe's General Staff after the death of Günther Korten in the 20 July plot.

Dissatisfied with Hermann Göring's leadership of the Luftwaffe, Adolf Hitler wanted to replace him with Robert Ritter von Greim. Unable to convince Greim to accept the role, Hitler forced Göring to sack Kreipe, and provisionally replace him on 19 September 1944 with the stolid Karl Koller, who was officially assigned the position on 12 November. However, Koller was unable to reform the Luftwaffe, which had been mismanaged by Göring and had lost air superiority over the skies of Europe.

In January 1945, he organised the logistical effort and preparation for the Luftwaffe's last major offensive, Unternehmen Bodenplatte (Operation Baseplate) on 1 January 1945. Kreipe continued in staff positions until surrendering to the Western Allies in May 1945.

=== Post-WWII ===
In 1947, Kreipe was released from prisoner-of-war captivity and returned to his family. Dr.-Ing. Hans-Christoph Seebohm—an academic mining engineer who served as President of the Braunschweig Chamber of Industry and Commerce from 1947 to 1963 and as Federal Minister of Transport in Chancellor Konrad Adenauer’s cabinet from 20 September 1949 to 30 November 1966—brought the retired General Kreipe into the Federal Ministry of Transport in 1951. Kreipe was appointed Ministerialrat (Senior Civil Servant) and headed Division L 3 for several years; this was the specialized Referat responsible for air traffic within the Aviation Department (Department L). Since the Allies had initially stripped the Federal Republic of Germany of its sovereignty over its airspace following World War II, the core task of Division L 3 was the preparation and administrative management of domestic and international civil air traffic.

The division planned how commercial air traffic in Germany should be structured and relaunched following total demilitarization. Under the direction of Division L 3, the organizational and legal foundations were laid for the revival of the airline—which initially launched in 1953 as Aktiengesellschaft für Luftverkehrsbedarf (Luftag) and was renamed Deutsche Lufthansa AG in 1954. As Germany did not fully regain sovereignty over its airspace until the Paris Agreements of 1955, the division conducted behind-the-scenes negotiations regarding participation in international agreements (such as those with the ICAO) and prepared bilateral air transport agreements with other nations. The division issued the first operating licenses for commercial ad-hoc flights, charter services, and special airspace uses within West German territory. Division L 3 thus formed the administrative nucleus in which officials with an aviation background laid the foundation for the entire civil aviation sector of the young Federal Republic of Germany. At the same time, from 1955 until his death, he served as Deputy Chairman of the Supervisory Board of Lufthansa.

In 1962, he was promoted to the rank of Ministerialdirektor (Undersecretary) and assumed leadership of the entire Aviation Department (Department L) within the Federal Ministry of Transport. He thus held overall responsibility for civil aviation policy, aviation law, and air traffic control in the Federal Republic of Germany. His remit shifted to the strategic, political, and regulatory management of the entire German airspace at the ministerial level. In this new role, the Federal Aviation Office (LBA) in Braunschweig—responsible for technical inspections, certifications, and licensing—and the Federal Administration for Air Traffic Control (BFS)—responsible for airspace monitoring—reported directly to Kreipe. He had served in Chancellor Ludwig Erhard's cabinet since 1963.

As the senior aviation official, he represented West Germany in international organizations such as Eurocontrol (the European organization for the safety of air navigation, founded in 1960) and the ICAO. A key aspect of this role involved the complex coordination of aviation law with the Western Allies regarding air corridors to West Berlin. Under his leadership, the Ministry increasingly took on the task of reviewing the economic viability of German airlines. He managed the allocation of traffic rights to foreign airlines operating in Germany, thereby simultaneously protecting the market position of the national carrier, Lufthansa.

Kreipe directed ministerial planning for the massive expansion of Germany’s major airports; the advent of mass and charter tourism, combined with the introduction of modern jet aircraft (such as the Boeing 707) in the early 1960s, necessitated entirely new capacity levels and longer runways. His department drafted legislation and regulations to align the German Air Traffic Act (LuftVG) with technological advancements, introducing measures such as new noise protection standards and safety guidelines. In summary, in 1962 Kreipe moved from operational "development work" to the top-level supervisory and strategic role within West German civil aviation. He thus became the most influential official in this sector after Federal Transport Minister Hans-Christoph Seebohm.

== Death ==
He passed away in Badenweiler on 7 September 1967 at the age of 63 in the same year his regular term of service at the ministry would have ended.

=== Badenweiler ===
Kreipe was staying in Badenweiler for a health retreat. He did not own a home there; rather, his primary residence and the center of his life were in the Bonn/Bad Godesberg area at the time, not far from his workplace at the Federal Ministry of Transport. The fact that he died in Badenweiler specifically is due to the town's historical significance: in the 1950s and early 1960s—the early years of the Federal Republic—Badenweiler, located in the Black Forest, was one of the most renowned health resorts for West German celebrities, top politicians, and high-ranking officials seeking relief from cardiovascular ailments or exhaustion. During his recuperative stay there, Kreipe suffered an acute medical emergency (typically a heart attack or stroke) and subsequently died from the consequences.

== Promotions ==
- 1 April 1922 Freiwilliger (Volunteer)
  - 4 August 1923 appointed officer candidate
- 15 September 1923 [Fahnenjunker-]Gefreiter (Officer Candidate with Lance Corporal rank)
- 15 November 1923 überzähliger [Fahnenjunker-]Unteroffizier (supernumerary Officer Candidate with Corporal/NCO/Junior Sergeant rank)
- 1 December 1923 planmäßiger [Fahnenjunker-]Unteroffizier (regular Officer Candidate with Corporal/NCO/Junior Sergeant rank)
- 1 October 1924 Fähnrich (Officer Cadet)
- 31 July 1925 Oberfähnrich (Senior Officer Cadet) with effect from 1 August 1925
- 19 December 1925 Leutnant (2nd Lieutenant) with effect and Rank Seniority (RDA) from 1 December 1925 (55)
- 23 September 1928 Oberleutnant (1st Lieutenant) with effect and RDA from 1 September 1928 (6)
  - 19 May 1930 after returning from the Lipetsk fighter-pilot school, reinstated as Oberleutnant (1st Lieutenant) with effect from 1 June 1930 and RDA from 1 September 1928 (6)

=== Luftwaffe ===
- 1 October 1934 Hauptmann (Captain) with Rank Seniority (RDA) from 1 April 1934 (16a)
- 20 April 1937 Major with effect and RDA from 1 April 1937 (16)
- 14 November 1940 Oberstleutnant (Lieutenant Colonel) with effect from 1 November 1940 and RDA from 1 May 1940 (3)
- 1 April 1942 Oberst (Colonel) (18)
- 1 March 1943 Generalmajor (Major General) without RDA
  - 24 August 1943 received RDA from 1 September 1943 (17)
- 1 July 1944 Generalleutnant (Lieutenant General) (10)
- 5 September 1944 General der Flieger with effect and RDA from 1 September 1944 (5)

== Awards and decorations ==
- Blood Order on 30 October 1934
- Combined Pilot/Observer Badge of the Luftwaffe on 15 August 1935
- Wehrmacht Long Service Award, 4th to 3rd Class on 2 October 1936
- Order of the Crown of Italy, Officer on 29 September 1937
- French Military Pilot Badge (Brevet militaire de pilote) on 29 September 1937
- Anschluss Medal
- Sudetenland Medal
- Spanish Cross in Silver without Swords
- Iron Cross, 2nd and 1st Class
  - 1st Class on 23 May 1940
- Order of the White Rose of Finland, Commander 2nd Class on 11 June 1941
- Front Flying Clasp of the Luftwaffe in Bronze on 13 June 1941
- Imperial Order of the Yoke and Arrows, Gold Medal on 19 September 1941
- German Cross in Gold on 25 June 1942 as Oberst in the general staff of the 1. Flieger-Korps
- Winter Battle in the East 1941–42 Medal on 1 July 1942
- War Merit Cross (1939), 2nd Class with Swords

== Sources ==
- German Federal Archives: BArch PERS 6/237 and PERS 6/260281

Military offices
Preceded by General der Flieger Günther Korten	Acting Chief of the Luftwaffe General Staff; 2 August 1944 – 28 October 1944	Succeeded by General der Flieger Karl Koller
