= Walter Boenicke =

Nazi general (1895–1947)

- Born: 15 December 1895; Radisleben
- Died: 21 April 1947 (aged 51); Munster, Lower Saxony, Germany
- Military career
- Allegiance: German Empire; Weimar Republic; Nazi Germany
- Branch: Prussian Army; Reichsheer; Luftwaffe
- Service years: 1914–1945
- Rank: General der Flieger
- Commands: 3. Flieger-Division
- Conflicts: World War I World War II
- Awards: Knight's Cross of the Iron Cross

Walter Boenicke (15 December 1895 – 21 April 1947) was a German general (General der Flieger) in the Luftwaffe during World War II who commanded the 3. Flieger Division. He was a recipient of the Knight's Cross of the Iron Cross. Boenicke surrendered to the British troops in May 1945 and committed suicide on 21 April 1947.

== Awards ==
- Knight's Cross of the Iron Cross on 14 May 1944 as Generalleutnant and commander of 3. Flieger-Division

Military offices
Preceded by Oberst Herbert Riecjhoff	Commander of 3. Flieger-Division; 6 January 1944 – 30 April 1944	Succeeded by Generalmajor Sigismund Freiherr von Falkenstein
