= General der Flieger =

Flag officer rank in Luftwaffe

General of the Aviators General der Flieger
- Collar patch and flying suit insignia

- Luftwaffe shoulder board
- Country: Nazi Germany
- Service branch: Luftwaffe
- Rank: Three-star
- Next higher rank: Generaloberst
- Next lower rank: Generalleutnant
- Equivalent ranks: See list

General der Flieger (English: General of the aviators) was a General of the branch rank of the Luftwaffe (air force) in Nazi Germany. Until the end of World War II in 1945, this particular general officer rank was on three-star level (OF-8), equivalent to a US Lieutenant general.

The "General of the branch" ranks of the Luftwaffe were in 1945:

- General of parachute troops
- General of anti-aircraft artillery
- General of the aviators
- General of air force communications troops
- General of the air force

The rank was equivalent to the General of the branch ranks of the Heer (army) as follows:

Heer

- General of artillery
- General of mountain troops
- General of infantry
- General of cavalry
- General of the communications troops
- General of panzer troops (armoured troops)
- General of engineers
- General of the medical corps
- General of the veterinary corps

Other services

The rank was also equivalent to the German three-star ranks:

- Admiral of the Kriegsmarine, equivalent to (US Vice admiral) and
- SS-Obergruppenführer und General der Waffen-SS in the Waffen-SS.

junior Rank; Generalleutnant	(German officer rank); General der Flieger	senior Rank; Generaloberst

== A ==
- Alexander Andrae (1888–1979)

== B ==
- Karl Barlen (1890–1956)
- Hellmuth Bieneck (1887–1972)
- Karl-Heinrich Bodenschatz (1890–1979)
- Walter Boenicke (1895–1947)
- Rudolf Bogatsch (1891–1970)
- Alfred Bülowius (1892–1968)

== C ==
- Friedrich Christiansen (1879–1972)
- Friedrich von Cochenhausen (1879–1946)
- Joachim Coeler (1891–1955)

== D ==
- Heinrich Danckelmann (1887–1947)
- Paul Deichmann (1898–1981)
- Egon Doerstling (1890–1965)
- Eduard Dransfeld (1883–1964)
- Karl Drum (1893–1968)

== E ==
- Karl Eberth (1877–1952)

== F ==
- Hellmuth Felmy (1885–1965)
- Martin Fiebig (1891–1947)
- Johannes Fink (1895–1981)
- Veit Fischer (1890–1966)
- Helmuth Förster (1889–1965)
- Stefan Fröhlich (1889–1978)
- Heribert Fütterer (1894–1963)

== G ==
- Hans Geisler (1891–1966)
- Ulrich Grauert (1889–1941) later promoted to Generaloberst
- Hermann Göring (1893–1946) former a General der Infanterie, later promoted to Generaloberst, Generalfeldmarschall and Reichsmarschall

== H ==
- Wilhelm Haehnelt (1875–1946)
- Hans Halm (1879–1957)
- Friedrich-Carl Hanesse (1892–1975)
- Willi Harmjanz (1893–1983)
- Otto Hoffmann von Waldau (1898–1943)

== J ==
- Hans Jeschonnek (1899–1943) then a Generaloberst (1942)

== K ==
- Josef Kammhuber (1896–1986)
- Erich Karlewski (1874–1947)
- Gustav Kastner-Kirdorf (1881–1945)
- Leonhard Kaupisch (1878–1945)
- Albert Kesselring (1885–1960) later promoted to Generalfeldmarschall
- Ulrich Kessler (1894–1983)
- Karl Kitzinger (1886–1962)
- Waldemar Klepke (1882–1945)
- Robert Knauss (1892–1955)
- Karl Koller (1898–1951)
- Werner Kreipe (1904–1967)

== L ==
- Otto Langemeyer (1883–1950)
- Hermann von der Lieth-Thomsen (1867–1942)

== M ==
- Alfred Mahncke (1888–1979)
- Wilhelm Mayer (1886–1950)
- Rudolf Meister (1897–1958)
- Erhard Milch (1892–1972) later promoted to Generalfeldmarschall
- Max Mohr (1884–1966)
- Walter Musshoff (1885–1971)

== P ==
- Erich Petersen (1889–1963)
- Kurt Pflugbeil (1890–1955)
- Maximilian Ritter von Pohl (1893–1951)
- Richard Putzier (1890–1979)

== Q ==
- Erich Quade (1883–1959)

== R ==
- Georg Rieke (1894–1970)
- Hans Ritter (1893–1991)

== S ==
- Hugo Schmidt (1885–1964)
- Wilhelm Schubert (1879–1972)
- Julius Schulz (1889–1975)
- Karl-Friedrich Schweickhard (1883–1968)
- Hans-Georg von Seidel (1891–1955)
- Hans Seidemann (1902–1967)
- Hans Siburg (1893–1976)
- Wilhelm Speidel (1895–1970)

== V ==
- Albert Vierling (1887–1969)

== W ==
- Bernhard Waber (1884–1945)
- Walther Wecke (1885–1943)
- Ralph Wenninger (1890–1945)
- Helmuth Wilberg (1880–1941)
- Wilhelm Wimmer (1889–1973)
- Bodo von Witzendorff (1876–1943)
- Ludwig Wolff (1886–1950)

== Z ==
- Konrad Zander (1883–1947)

== See also ==
- General (Germany)
- Comparative officer ranks of World War II
