= Robert Fuchs (general) =

German military general (1895–1977)

- Born: 11 May 1895
- Died: 15 January 1977 (aged 83)
- Military career
- Allegiance: Nazi Germany
- Branch: Luftwaffe
- Rank: Generalmajor
- Commands: KG 26; 1st Air Division
- Conflicts: World War II
- Awards: Knight's Cross of the Iron Cross

Robert Fuchs (11 May 1895 – 15 January 1977) was a German general during World War II who commanded the 1st Air Division. He was a recipient of the Knight's Cross of the Iron Cross.

== Awards and decorations ==
- Knight's Cross of the Iron Cross on 6 April 1940 as Oberst and Geschwaderkommodore of Kampfgeschwader 26

Military offices
Preceded by Generalmajor Hans Siburg	Commander of KG 26; 29 September 1939 – 15 October 1940	Succeeded by Oberst Alexander Holle
Preceded by General der Flieger Paul Deichmann	Commander of 1. Flieger-Division; 7 November 1943 – 8 May 1945	Succeeded by None
