= Fliegerführer Atlantik =

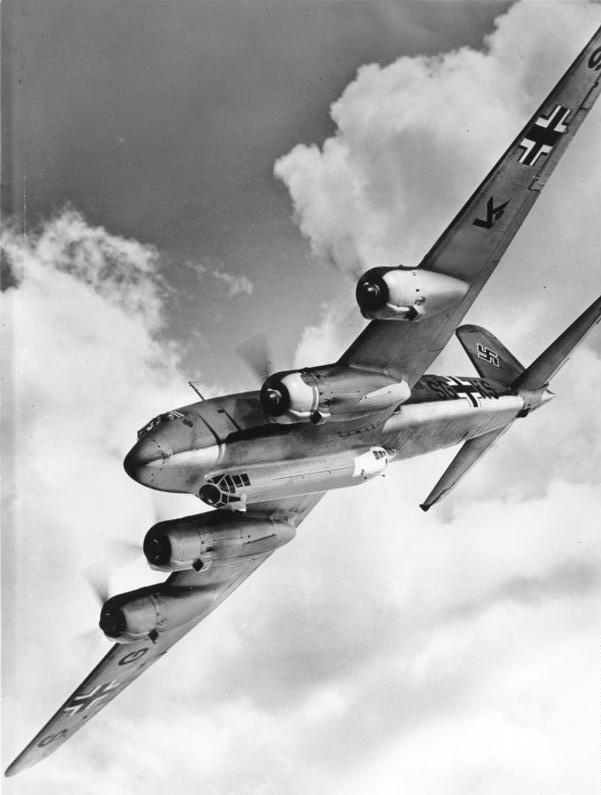
- A Focke-Wulf Fw 200 Condor, the main threat to Atlantic convoys from the air
- Active: 1941–44
- Country: Nazi Germany
- Branch: Luftwaffe
- Type: Bomber
- Role: Aerial reconnaissance Aerial warfare Air supremacy Anti-maritime transport Anti-submarine warfare Anti-surface warfare Close air support Maritime interdiction Tactical bombing
- Size: Air Fleet
- Engagements: First Happy Time; Operation Rheinübung; Operation Berlin; Last battle of the battleship Bismarck; Second Happy Time

Commanders
- Notable commanders: Martin Harlinghausen

Fliegerführer Atlantik (German: Flyer Command Atlantic) was a World War II Luftwaffe naval air command for anti-maritime transport, anti-submarine, anti-surface fleet, close air support for the Kriegsmarine for operations in the Atlantic Ocean, maritime interdiction and maritime reconnaissance. The air command fought exclusively in the Battle of the Atlantic.

At the outbreak of the war in September 1939, the Luftwaffe had few specialised naval aviation units and aircraft. By 1940, the Wehrmacht occupied much of Western Europe and Scandinavia. The Kriegsmarine (Navy) and its commander-in-chief Erich Raeder saw this as an opportunity to destroy the sea communications of the United Kingdom, Germany's last significant opponent in Europe.

In February 1941, the Oberkommando der Luftwaffe (OKL) was ordered by Adolf Hitler to form a naval air command to support the Kriegsmarine's U-boat operations in the Battle of the Atlantic. Commander-in-chief of the Luftwaffe, Hermann Göring, agreed to the formation of the specialised naval command which remained under the operational control of the Luftwaffe and was subordinated to Luftflotte 3, commanded by Hugo Sperrle. The command had jurisdiction over all Luftwaffe operations in the Atlantic Ocean, English Channel and Irish Sea. The organisation's first commanding officer was Martin Harlinghausen.

The command flew in action and achieved considerable success in 1941. Prime Minister Winston Churchill referred to Fliegerführer Atlantik and its main weapon of war, the Focke-Wulf Fw 200 Condor, as the "scourge of the Atlantic". At the close of the year British countermeasures tamed the threat from long-range German aircraft. As the battles in the Atlantic intensified in 1942 and 1943 the command made continuous demands for aircraft and crews. Busy in other theatres, the Luftwaffe could not afford to divert or create forces for Atlantic operations. Along with reconnaissance and anti-shipping operations, Fliegerführer Atlantik provided fighters for air superiority to cover U-boat transit routes in the Bay of Biscay against RAF Coastal Command.

By 1944 Fliegerführer Atlantik had ceased to be effective and in April it had been disbanded and merged into Fliegerkorps X (10th Flying Corps). Throughout its existence, Kampfgeschwader 40 was the command's main combat unit.

== Background ==
The Imperial German Navy (German: Kaiserliche Marine) conducted aerial operations in the North Sea in World War I. The German Naval Air Corps (German: Marinefliegerkorps) gained air superiority and proved effective in anti-shipping operations. Despite battling bravely in the war the navy, unlike the Imperial German Army, lacked a major victory. The Army's success in contrast could be traced back to the Napoleonic Wars and there was a tradition in learning from experience. When the Reichsmarine was instituted by the Weimar Government (1919–1933), German naval officers were conscious of their wartime record and their status as the junior service. All of this contributed to the reluctance to undertake an examination of naval air operations. By 1921 the Reichsmarine had not made much progress in building a new air service. It possessed only 15 pilots.

Inter-service rivalry also hampered the development of German naval air doctrine. The Navy was unwilling to cooperate too closely with the army in aerial manoeuvres. The former Luftstreitkräfte (Air Service) officers, now employed in the army, knew that the naval staff had been the main opponents of the creation of an independent air arm and viewed the German Admiralty with suspicion. The navy resented the Luftstreitkräfte men in turn for their control of production and development of aircraft during the war. The German naval staff remained angered by the army's unwillingness to support naval logistics and the development of naval aviation requirements. Commander-in-chief of the Reichsmarine Admiral Hans Zenker was also wary of the Reichstag's attitude toward the navy. In the 1920s the very need for a German fleet of any kind was in question. Zenker was certain that if cooperation with the army was too close, the navy might be placed under army command.

The Reichsmarine supported a small naval air program. Heinkel and Dornier Flugzeugwerke were contracted to produce seaplanes and naval aircraft. Ernst Heinkel's Heinkel He 1 and Claude Dornier's Dornier Wal were among the most effective seaplanes and flying boats of the 1920s. One advantage for the navy was the allowance of a large anti-aircraft force. The navy could use aircraft for towing and exercises which enabled it to conduct a more open program of aircraft development in contrast to the army. Zenker felt it unnecessary to join the army in clandestine development programs in Russia. In the early 1920s the navy spent one-sixth of what the army spent on aviation.

The Treaty of Versailles banned most aspects of aerial development in Germany. For all of its diligence the treaty did not prohibit naval exercises with aircraft. The loophole allowed for the development of aircraft in the naval sphere of influence. The Paris Treaty of 1926 restated the terms of the treaty in Versailles but relented over the issue of air defence. Germany would be permitted to develop air defence systems to guard against aerial aggression. Although this did not translate into permission to develop naval aircraft, by 1927 the Germans were initiating secret training and design programs at Warnemünde under the guise of Radio Experimental Command. A Coastal Air Section was created but masqueraded as a private enterprise. It was dissolved on 1 September 1929 in favour of using private firms. The Reichsmarine hired aircraft for fleet exercises from Luftdienst G.m.b.H which charged the navy 453 RM per hour for a contracted allowance of 3,000 flying hours per year. By 31 January 1931 naval air cadets were joining the navy in significant numbers and the first regulations on cooperation between naval and air units were published. The beginnings of a naval air arm had been created.

=== Göring and Raeder ===
When Adolf Hitler and the National Socialist party came to power in 1933 the work by the Reichsmarine and the Weimar Republic was reversed. Hitler appointed his close associate Hermann Göring, a Nazi supporter, ally of Hitler, World War I flying ace and the holder of the Orden Pour le Mérite, as National Kommissar for aviation. Former Deutsche Luft Hansa director Erhard Milch was appointed deputy. In April 1933 the Reichsluftfahrtministerium (RLM – Reich Air Ministry) was established under Göring's direction. Göring decreed all military aviation belonged to the Luftwaffe, created in March 1933. It was to exist as an independent air force.

Göring's logic in having an independent air force was militarily prudent but the future Reichsmarschall saw the new Luftwaffe as a personal power base as well as a crucial war weapon and would not divide it with the navy. Göring's behaviour brought him into conflict with Großadmiral Erich Raeder, commander-in-chief of the navy—known as the Kriegsmarine from 1935. Göring loathed the navy and Raeder. In Göring's perception, Raeder and the navy represented the bourgeois clique of German society the National Socialist revolution had pledged to eliminate. During World War II their rivalry devolved into open hostility. Raeder did not oppose the independence of a German air force but wanted a naval air arm under naval control. If the Kriegsmarine was to be effective it required aerial striking power. The arguments over the control of naval aviation ended temporarily, until 1937, when the German Defence Ministry (German: Reichswehrministerium) stated naval aviation would be the domain of the Luftwaffe but specialised units would be placed under the operational control of the Kriegsmarine.

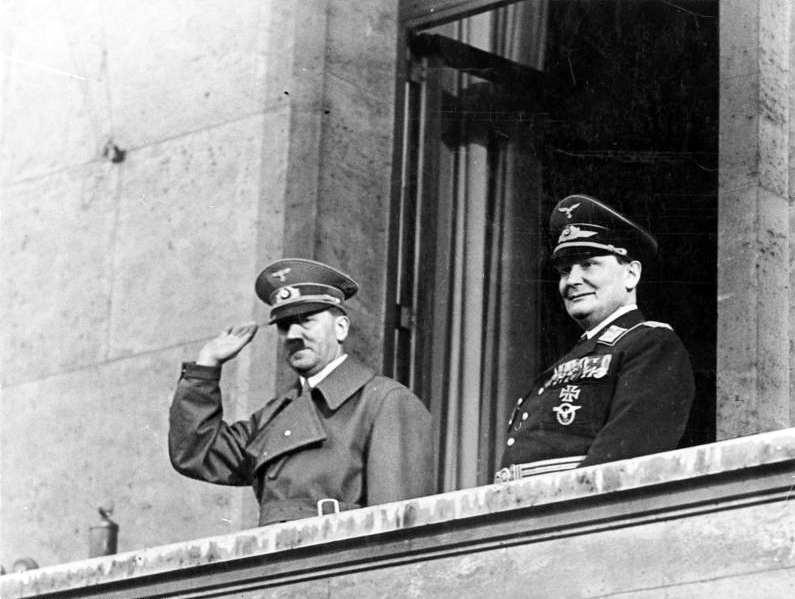
Adolf Hitler (left) with Hermann Göring, 1938

On 4 February 1937 Göring invited Raeder to a private conference with the aim of sidelining the proposals. At the meeting, held on 11 March, Raeder handed Göring a detailed memorandum asking for naval aviation to be seconded, permanently, to the navy as it was in the best position to understand naval–air requirements. Raeder found support from the commander-in-chief of the Wehrmacht (German armed forces) Werner von Blomberg. Blomberg summarily confirmed the current proposals but the meeting did not completely resolve the question over which service should be responsible for aerial operations at sea, with aircraft carrier forces a future consideration. The naval staff recognised the defective proposal and complained again at the absence of a clear resolution. On 10 March a new conference was organised with Albert Kesselring, Oberkommando der Luftwaffe Chief of the General Staff and Göring on 1 April and 10 May without result. Göring perceived Blomberg's and Raeder's proposals as power-grabbing and he refused to commit air units to naval command during specific operations. Perhaps exasperated and defeated, Raeder noted on 20 May 1937, "Commander in Chief, Navy has decided that the demand of command by the Navy over all Naval Air units shall not be voiced." Raeder noted that Göring would probably never agree to dividing his service.

The Kriegsmarine—Luftwaffe dispute rumbled on through 1937 and 1938. Göring did not openly reject the claim of the navy on technical grounds, nor did he deny the importance of air power in sea warfare, which gave him plenty of latitude in discussions. Rather, Göring feigned willingness to cooperate, but only really did so in matters and ways that the Luftwaffe could profit from the operational research of the Kriegsmarine. Göring ordered the dismemberment of naval–air activities and organisations at his own discretion and according to his own plans. Göring was named Hitler's deputy for the Four Year Plan and he was now in a position to govern all policy concerning the allocation of aerial resources weakening the position of the navy. Final confirmation of how the air and sea arms were to interact was decided at a conference on 27 February 1939, and ratified by a memorandum drawn up by Karl Bodenschatz (adjutant to Göring) signed by Göring and Raeder. The former would retain all control over naval air units and operational control would be exercised by a Luftwaffe liaison officer assigned to the Kriegsmarine.

The regression of naval aviation continued. During the Spanish Civil War German aircraft—mainly Heinkel He 59 and Heinkel He 60s—sank 144 ships out of the 554 lost by the Republican forces. Before the fall of Barcelona in 1939, for example, German aircraft sank 30 ships and damaged scores more in the harbour. The success of anti-shipping operations did not spur naval aviation to a place of importance. Resembling the policies of Admiral Zemker, doctrine produced under Walter Wever's tenure as Chief of the General Staff (1933–1936) relegated naval concerns to fourth place on the list of priorities in the Conduct of the Air War in 1935—which remained unchanged. Nevertheless, much of the progress in naval aviation was initiated by the Luftwaffe, rather than the Kriegsmarine. General Hellmuth Felmy, commanding Luftlotte 2, set up a specialised naval aircraft corps in his command under the control of Hans Geisler—a naval aviator and former sailor. In the event of war, Felmy was responsible for conducting air operations against England in May 1939. Another naval airman, Joachim Coeler, was appointed Inspector of Naval Aviation. These men developed air-dropped torpedoes and naval mines which proved very successful from 1940. However, all attempts to produce a naval air arm were thwarted by Hitler's deputy and commander-in-chief of the Luftwaffe, Hermann Göring.

=== World War II ===
On 1 September 1939, the Polish Campaign began when German forces invaded Poland beginning World War II in Europe. The Kriegsmarine was immediately engaged in operations against the British Royal Navy in the North Sea. The inadequacy of naval–air operations was brought to Hitler's attention to Raeder on 23 October 1939. The admiral urged closer cooperation by sea and air services. On 30 October 1939 Naval Group West, under the command of Admiral Alfred Saalwächter, submitted a memorandum to the Oberkommando der Marine the Naval Staff entitled Air Units under the Commander, Naval Air West. Saalwächter noted the forces at his disposal were too weak to support operations over vast distances and current operations exhausted the tiny forces at his disposal, rendering them unfit for operations for extended periods. The situation, he noted, made it impossible to reconnoitre an opponent's activities or attack their forces in clear weather conditions. Saalwächter complained that the Dornier Do 18 and Heinkel He 115 aircraft available were too few in number and losses outstripped production. He required 378 aircraft with 126 battle-ready but strength stood at 85 machines. There was no authority to which the Naval Staff could submit this request; Raeder lobbied Hitler for more resources but he deferred to Göring. Göring proposed that of the 12 Staffeln (squadrons) of naval aircraft in existence, three be sent to the X. Fliegerkorps (10th Flying Corps), intended as a specialist anti-shipping formation. The remaining nine Raeder could retain. Raeder sent a rejection letter to Göring on 31 October 1939 requesting naval air units be expanded to 24 Staffeln up to 1942, but to no avail.

Raeder attended a meeting with Hitler on 21 December 1939. He informed Hitler that naval reconnaissance operations were impossible. In response, Göring allowed X. Fliegerkorps to be seconded to the navy and for the transfer of Dornier Do 17 bombers to the corps. The transfer did not transpire as agreed. Admiral Otto Schniewind compiled a memo on 15 January 1940 entitled Organisation and Expansion of the Naval Air Units of Commander in Chief, Navy. Schniewind noted only 14 Staffeln (Squadrons) were at the disposal of the navy. Schniewind wanted X. Fliegerkorps to be given responsibility for all air-sea operations and to assist naval–controlled units when required. He also asked for an allocation of the new Dornier Do 217 bomber, then under development, for naval use. Göring limited naval squadrons to nine multi-purpose and six reconnaissance units but did not resist the suggestion X. Fliegerkorps be the main weapon in anti-shipping operations. He refused to allow the navy the Do 217 and insisted the He 115 would have to remain sufficient. He assured the navy the new type would go to X. Fliegerkorps. On 4 April 1940 Göring implemented another program to reduce the naval air forces from 12 to nine Junkers Ju 88s per Staffel, 11 Do 17s per Dornier-staffel, and nine in each Blohm & Voss BV 138-equipped Staffel. The number of staffeln Göring intended to make available was not stated. The proposal was put to the Naval Staff on the eve of Operation Weserübung, the invasion of Denmark and Norway. In the event, the campaign proved what even small air force could accomplish against transport shipping and enemy warships.

On 10 May 1940, the Wehrmacht invaded and overran The Netherlands, Belgium and France within 46 days, securing French capitulation on 25 June 1940. The occupation of France enabled the Germans to carry out an air and naval assault on every region of the United Kingdom and the sea lanes surrounding it. The strategic advantage gained by the possession of French air and naval bases on the Atlantic coast put German U-boats and aircraft about 700 mi (1,100 km) closer to the critical Allied shipping lanes and within range of British ports in the south, east, west and north. German submarines could reach much deeper into the Atlantic, all the way to the east coast of the United States and Canada—the later being a major source of resources and protection in the shape of the Royal Canadian Navy; the third largest navy in the world by 1945. This advantage enabled the U-boats to avoid the very dangerous passage to the Atlantic through the North Sea, or the heavily mined English Channel. Crucially, it allowed for deep Atlantic operations by the Luftwaffe.

=== British sea communications ===
Even in 1940, the Luftwaffe did not have the command structure and resources in a number of essential areas. It lacked specialised maritime aircraft designs, a staff interest in naval aviation, and possessed a commander-in-chief who was unwilling to cooperate with the Kriegsmarine. Those responsible for German strategy at that time did not immediately recognise the potential damage the Luftwaffe could do to British sea communications. The Luftwaffe was busy replacing its losses from the Western campaign in which it had lost 28 per cent of its aircraft. Although it had over 1,000 medium bombers in July 1940 the Luftwaffe did not possess many long-range aircraft or effective air-dropped torpedoes, nor was it experienced in operations against naval vessels. The shortcomings of the Luftwaffe in this regard were not readily apparent, for the threat from German aircraft against unarmoured and slow merchant ships and even warships on occasion, had been proven in the Norwegian Campaign.

OKL did not view sea communications as the principal target of the air arm. Göring and his chief of staff, Hans Jeschonnek, thought an aerial assault on mainland Britain would destroy its armament factories, the Royal Air Force (RAF) and British morale. Victory in the Battle of Britain, they hoped, would be enough to convince the British to sue for peace. The Oberkommando der Wehrmacht (OKW) hoped peace negotiations would avoid a hazardous amphibious landing in Britain, code-named Operation Sea Lion (Seelöwe), from being carried out. Hitler was receptive to this idea, and his Führer Directive No. 17 made sure German efforts went into planning and executing Operation Eagle Attack, which intensified the struggle for air superiority over southern England after 13 August. In this operation, targeting British shipping came a distant second to destroying the RAF and military industries on land. The strategy demonstrated the extent to which the OKL hoped to win the war purely by the use of air power against land targets. The preceding German air operations against seaports and shipping in July and August 1940—a phase in the battle known as the Kanalkampf—were merely a prelude to the battle for air superiority which was a necessary precondition for Seelöwe. Anti-shipping operations fell by 239 sorties in August to 90 in September 1940.

For the Kriegsmarine this was the least desirable strategy. Raeder and Karl Dönitz, commander of the U-boat force, believed the diversion of the Luftwaffe to these tasks was a wasted opportunity and interfered with the demands of the naval staff for support and reconnaissance in the Battle of the Atlantic. On 14 July Göring agreed to intensify mine-laying across the entrances to ports and known shipping routes as a substitute. The production of mines was only 800–1000 per month and the limited production permitted operations mainly in the Thames Estuary. IX Fliegerdivision (later IX Fliegerkorps) was ordered to carry out these operations to the detriment of all other activities. Aerial mining was highly effective but the lack of mine production prevented decisive results. The naval staff had hoped the OKL would honour the 13th Directive, dated 24 May 1940, which dictated the British economy be struck. The naval staff regarded the port of London, Liverpool and the Bristol Channel as important targets.

By October 1940, daylight air battles over Britain were replaced by night operations. Raeder and Dönitz pressured Hitler to divert more of the bombing effort to ports and German air strategy shifted to bombing British port cities in The Blitz. In the interim period, air attacks on convoys did restart in November 1940. Dropping mines was the main tactic; up until then it had been standard practice to drop a few mines over a large area, in order to force the British to use large resources mine-sweeping huge portions of ocean. To guarantee the entrances to ports were mined, as many mines as possible were dropped at once in confined areas. This was successful in the Thames Estuary where the Germans claimed nine steamers sunk and the river blockaded for 14 days.

On 6 February 1941, Hitler signed Führer Directive No. 23 Directions for operations against the British War Economy, and aerial interdiction of British imports by sea became top priority. In 1941 British port cities suffered intensive air raids—the Plymouth, Hull, Cardiff, Bristol, Clydebank and Belfast Blitz suggest the OKL adhered to the new directive.

By the end of the air offensive over Britain in May 1941, as the Germans prepared for the invasion of the Soviet Union (Operation Barbarossa), the Luftwaffe had, on occasion, done serious damage to these port targets. In operations against Liverpool around 75% of the port's capacity was reduced at one point, and it lost 39,126 long tons (39,754 t) of shipping to air attacks, with another 111,601 long tons (113,392 t) damaged. However, this did not fundamentally alter the war at sea. Bad weather and the omnipresent Göring consistently resisted attempts by naval forces to gain influence in air power matters throughout the war.

== Formation of Fliegerführer Atlantik ==
On 6 January 1941, while Göring was on holiday, Raeder approached Hitler asking for more support to assist the growing successes of the U-boats. Despite Göring's resistance, and under pressure from the navy, Hitler gave Raeder one Gruppe (Group) from Kampfgeschwader 40 (I./KG 40—1st group, Bomber Wing 40). The furious Göring returned and immediately engaged in political manipulation to have it returned to Luftwaffe control. He proposed that it be returned in exchange for an Atlantic command. Regardless of Raeder's objections, on 28 February 1941, Hitler agreed to Goring's "compromise" and authorised the formation of a Luftwaffe naval command, under the control of Luftflotte 3 (Air Fleet 3) and its commander Hugo Sperrle. Named Fliegerführer Atlantik, it was based at Lorient. Martin Harlinghausen was selected to command the organisation. He had been a naval officer in the 1920s but had moved to the Luftwaffe and acted as chief of staff for X. Fliegerkorps in Norway, and was a leading authority in anti-shipping attacks with bombs. He was a logical choice to lead Atlantic air operations. His headquarters were stationed in the village of Brandérion.

Harlinghausen was responsible for organising fleet support, meteorological missions and even coastal protection, although Küstenfliegergruppe (KuFlGr) (coastal aircraft group), Minensuchgruppe (MSGr—minesearch group) existed for that purpose. He had barely 100 aircraft operational including Arado Ar 196 float aircraft. His commitment to the Mediterranean Theatre of Operations while managing the staff of X Fliegerkorps, delayed his command until 31 March 1941. He agreed with the operational methods of Dönitz, who favoured using the four-engine Focke-Wulf Fw 200 "Condors" to shadow convoys and direct U-boats to their quarry; then to begin a coordinated air-sea attack to defeat the convoy.

Harlinghausen was given meager forces to achieve these ends. KG 40, based at Cognac and Bordeaux was handed over to him, containing all three groups of the unit (I., II., and III./KG 40). Küstenfliegergruppe 106, 406, 506, 606 and 906 were also made available, based at Amsterdam, (Netherlands), Brest, Westerland, Lannion, (France), Aalborg (Denmark). Aufklärungsgruppe 122, a reconnaissance unit, was based in several locations; at Amsterdam, Brest and Wilhelmshaven. Stab./KG 40 was known to have just one Fw 200 on strength on 31 March 1941. Owing to Hitler's order on 6 January 1941, I./KG 40 was initially under the command of Dönitz, who at that time was based at Lorient. It had only eight Fw 200s on strength at the end of 1940, and subsequent strength is unknown. II./KG 40 was formed with 1 Staffel on 1 January. The 5th and 6th Staffel worked up on Heinkel He 111 and Dornier Do 217 E-1s into late June 1941. On 26 July it was declared operational, and transferred to Cognac with 29 Do 217s (12 operational) and one He 111. III./KG 40 was known to have been formed on or about 24 March 1941, and was based at Brest. Strength details are unknown in 1941, but the unit did operate He 111s and the Fw 200.

It is estimated by April, 1941, Fliegerführer Atlantik had on strength 21 Fw 200s, 26 He 111s, 24 Heinkel He 115s, and a mixed force of Messerschmitt Bf 110s and Junkers Ju 88s, numbering 12 aircraft. The total number of aircraft by July 1941 had reached 155; 29 Fw 200s, 31 He 111s, 45 Ju 88s, 18 He 115s, 20 Dornier Do 217s, 12 Bf 110s and Ju 88 specialised reconnaissance aircraft. The command was not helped by the minuscule production of Fw 200 aircraft that remained at five per month in April 1941. 32 Ju 88s from KüFlGr 106 were added to the command's order of battle.

=== Equipment and tactics ===
The Fw 200 was the main weapon in the early rounds of the Atlantic air war. Its combat prowess rested on three vital capabilities: its ability to find targets, to hit targets and then to evade enemy defences. In 1940 the Fw 200s had only rudimentary capability of finding convoys and other suitable merchant targets. On a typical mission, an Fw 200 would fly about 1,500 km from Bordeaux to look for targets, west of Ireland, which gave the aircraft approximately three hours to conduct its search. Normally, Condors flew quite low (about 500 – 600 metres off the water), which made it easier to spot ships outlined against the horizon and avoided giving Allied shipping much warning. From this low altitude the Condor could search an area approximately the 320 by 120 km (200 by 75 nautical miles), which several crewman searching for ships with binoculars. In good weather, which was rare in the Atlantic, the observers might spot a convoy 15–20 km (9.3–12.4 mi) away, but cloud cover could reduce this by half. In 1941, improved Fw 200s meant longer range, and a four-hour station (up from three) could be maintained, which increased the search area by 25 per cent. In December 1942, the low-UHF band FuG 200 Hohentwiel ASV radar extended the search area to four times that of 1940. The radar could detect a ship 80 km (50 mi) away and its beam was 41 km (25 mi).

There were perennial problems for KG 40, and the other 'Condor units'. Lack of numbers and serviceability meant there was no guarantee that one or two sorties of three to eight hours would be active when a convoy passed through air space in range of the Luftwaffe. Thus the ability of Fliegerführer Atlantik to find convoys remained sporadic until late in the command's service.

Further limitations were a result of the design. A lack of proper bombsight equipment and poor forward visibility meant the aircraft had to attack from low level. This meant an approach at just 45 metres at 290 km/h (180 mph) and then release of bombs at 240 metres (790 ft) from the target. This was known as the "Swedish turnip" tactic by crews. This allowed for a high chance of a direct hit or damaging near miss. The Fw 200 carried four SC 250 kg bombs, ensuring a hit potential. Merchant vessels lacked armour or damage-control systems at that time, so a hit or more would have a high chance of sinking a ship. This meant an average of one ship sunk for every attack made. At low level, it was not uncommon for German crews to achieve three out of four hits. However, many bombs failed to explode at low level, owing to improper fusing of the ordnance. Once the Lotfernrohr 7D bombsight was introduced— with a similar degree of accuracy to the top secret American Norden bombsight— more accurate bombing from 3,000 metres (9,800 ft) could take place with an error range of just 91 metres (299 ft). Later Fw 200s were fitted with heavier machine guns and cannon, so that strikes at low level could also damage the superstructure of ships.

Improvements were quickly implemented but the type was a civilian design, converted to military use. Initially Fw 200Bs were built to fly in thin air at high altitude, with no sharp manoeuvring. Kurt Tank— its designer—had made the aircraft's long range possible by using a light airframe that was two to four tons lighter than its contemporaries. This meant the aircraft did not have fuel tank sealant or armour protection. An under-strength structure contributed to these vulnerabilities, which made the Fw 200 unable to sustain much punishment. The engines were also underpowered, meaning it struggled to stay airborne if one was knocked out. The six unarmoured fuel tanks inside the cabin made it exceptionally prone to bursting into flames. When a Condor attempted to manoeuvre to avoid anti-aircraft fire or enemy fighters, its weak structure could be damaged, causing metal fatigue and cracks, resulting in the loss of the aircraft. In the C variant, major improvements were made to its defensive armament, causing fighters to avoid lengthy duels. However, they operated at low level mostly, to avoid attacks from below. This limited their operational range and options. They could 'jink' to throw an enemy aircraft off its aim, but they could not outrun or outturn an opponent. Poor evasion qualities meant the type was not the ideal operational weapon.

== Combat operations ==
The Luftwaffe effort extended into the North and central Atlantic but cooperation between aircraft and submarines occurred more by accident than by design. Dönitz had foreseen the need for very long-range reconnaissance aircraft exercises with submarines in May 1938. He selected the Dornier Do 26 seaplane for service with Transozeanstaffel (Trans-Ocean Squadron) in October 1939. Unfortunately most of the aircraft were used in the invasion of Norway and the survivors were not a sufficient force. They served from Brest until March 1941 when they returned to Germany. Dönitz then placed his faith in the Heinkel He 177 program but the type suffered development problems and he had to settle for the Fw 200 as an interim solution. I./KG 40 under the command of Major Edgar Petersen was the first unit to reach Brest in July. Peterson, however, was employed in mine-laying operations with caused 16.6 percent losses. Peterson angrily protested to the then Chief of Staff Hans Jeschonnek who returned the unit to the reconnaissance role. The unit proved to be of little use. Crews were too few and restricted to two or three sorties every two weeks. Reports also had to pass through several commands—Fliegerkorps IV (to which I./KG 40 was attached) and then the naval command in France Marine Gruppe West—before being dispatched to submarine flotillas.

=== First "happy time" ===
The period, August 1940 to May 1941, was known by the Kriegsmarine as the First Happy Time, because of the considerable amount of Allied ships sunk for light losses in U-boats. Before the formation of Fliegerführer Atlantik, the success of air attack on convoys during this time was almost immediate. Under the command of Dönitz, in August 1940–February 1941, Fw 200s sank 52 ships for only four losses. At this time several anti-shipping leaders emerged. One pilot, Oberleutnant Bernhard Jope, crippled the RMS Empress of Britain. The sinking ship received a coup de grâce by U-32, commanded by Hans Jenisch. Hans Buchholz would also become another successful merchant ship "killer". By Christmas 1940, KG 40 had sunk 19 ships of approximately 100,000 tons and damaged 37: 180,000 tons of shipping. In January 1941, 17 ships were sunk amounting to 65,000 tons and five damaged. February was worse for the British, losing 21 ships to Fw 200s, totalling 84,301 tons.

The British recognised the threat posed by long-range German naval aircraft and set operations in motion to destroy the Condors at base. A Commando mission was considered but dismissed for operational difficulties and the likelihood of failure and heavy casualties. Instead, RAF Bomber Command was asked to destroy the bases on the Atlantic coast. These operations had been carried out before Fliegerführer Atlantik had been formed. An RAF raid on 22/23 November 1940 destroyed four hangars and two Fw 200s. Follow up raids were unsuccessful, and it was not until 13 April 1941 that three more Fw 200s were lost to air attack. The British failed to disrupt production at the Focke-Wulf plant at Bremen or to destroy more Condors in the field, due to poor bombing accuracy and improved German defences.

In January 1941, convoy HX 90, OB 274, HG 50 and SL 61 were attacked with success. The later raid, on 19 January, sank seven ships from HG 50 and SL 61. On 8 February, U-35 found convoy HG 53. The U-boat reported its presence to Fliegerführer Atlantik. I./KG 40 was dispatched and sank five ships (9,201 gross register tons (GRT)), although 29,000 GRT was claimed. The role was reversed a few days later when convoy OB 288 was discovered by Fw 200s. I./KG 40 damaged two ships amounting to 11,249 tons. After the attack the Fw 200s alerted the submarines. U-73, U-96, U-69, U-107 and U-552 sank a number of ships. On 26 February U-47 led six Fw 200s to a convoy it had attacked; Convoy OB 290. The submarine sank three and damaged two ships. The Condors sank another seven totalling 36,250 GRT. Another four ships—20,775 GRT—were damaged. The operation was the greatest single success for KG 40. A straggler was sunk by the Bianchi. In general, inadequate navigation training, exacerbated by out-of-date meteorological data, created errors in location of reports of up to 450 kilometres (280 mi), while 19 per cent of all reports gave errors in course of up to 90 degrees.

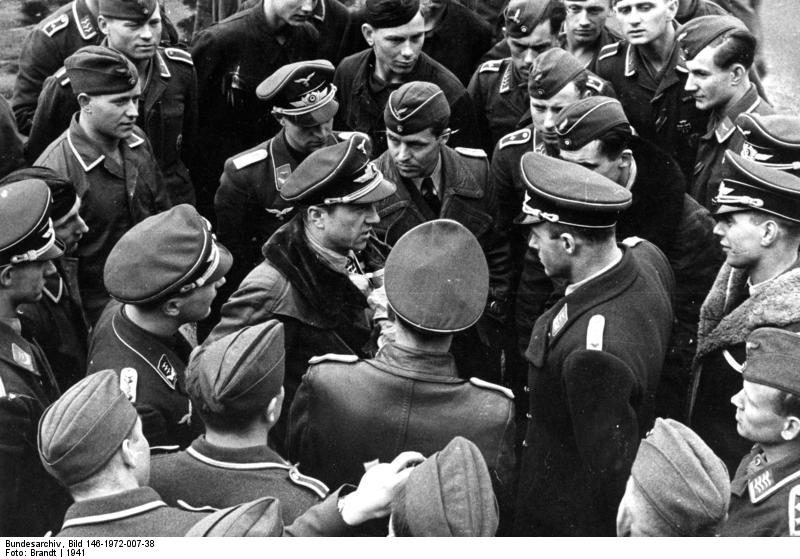
Photograph of KG 40 personnel, Bordeaux, 1941

The creation of Fliegerführer Atlantik gave Dönitz cause for optimism. It was not always easy, communicating and coordinating with air and sea forces. U-boats were unable to make accurate navigation using sun or star sightings and even when convoys were located they had trouble homing in bombers because their short-range transmitters were too weak to reach the aircraft. However, they were strong enough to alert British defences. Harlinghausen was irritated when his aircraft communicated accurate locations and the U-boats failed to respond. Only when he complained to the BdU did he learn from Dönitz that the navy often failed to inform the Luftwaffe that there were no U-boats in the area to respond. There were also errors in reports pertaining to location and course of convoys. By the end of March, 1941, attempts at close cooperation were abandoned in favour of more flexible approached. Dönitz noted in his war diary that enemy signals about German air attacks would allow his intelligence (B-Dienst) to locate the convoy. He supposed that this would offer a better chance of interception.

During the first quarter of 1941, the Condors sank 171,000 GRT, the vast majority being lone ships. In one case, a sustained attack upon convoy OB 290 on 26 February 1941 accounted for seven to nine vessels (49,865 GRT), all sunk by KG 40 Fw 200s. However, with never more than eight aircraft operational, this was an exception. Soon, British CAM ship (catapult aircraft merchantmen) appeared, and the time of light Condor losses ended. Buchholtz himself was killed when he encountered the SS Umgeni. Fw 200s flew long-flight patterns from Bordeaux to Stavanger in Norway. This tactic discovered convoy OB 287. Aircraft and submarines sank three and damaged three. The signal from the Fw 200s was picked up by U-47, and Günther Prien led the seaborne attack.

Dönitz envisaged a cooperation of air and sea forces in mass attacks against convoys. The wolfpack tactics were proving successful, and he sought to supplement them with the Luftwaffe. The Condors were to break up the convoys, and scatter them so the Wolf packs could move in and dispatch the ships while they were unprotected. In March, the Luftwaffe won back control of KG 40 had placed under Harlinghausen's control, and success dried up KG 40 was forced to suspend operations for two weeks (probably due to insufficient support). The unit sank three ships in March—Benvorlich on the 19th, Beaverbrae, 25th and on the 26th Empire Mermaid.

On 30/31 March 1941, an effort to lead U–73, U-97 and U-101 to OB 302, located by two FW 200s failed. In April KG 40 was only able to make 74 sorties. Attacks had been carried out on 6 and 16 April and by the end of the month, seven ships had been sunk. More ominously, RAF Coastal Command was making better efforts to defend convoys against air attack. On 16 April, a Bristol Beaufighter from RAF Aldergrove shot down a Fw 200C-3 – the first Condor lost in action to an enemy fighter. On 18 April, another Condor was badly damaged by fire from HG 58 and crashed in Ireland. Further operations failed. OB 316, 318 and HX 122 escaped the commands shadowing efforts. SL 72 and OB 321 were found on 11 and 14 May, and aircraft sank one ship from each convoy, but failed to guide any U-boats to their targets. In May, only three ships were sunk and one damaged. Around this time, the He 111 units were withdrawn owing to heavy losses in the Channel. They were replaced by Kampfgeschwader 26 and Kampfgeschwader 30 (Bomber Wing 26 and 30), which had remained under Luftflotte 5 after the withdrawal of Fliegerkorps X to the Mediterranean. These units made up 20 He 111 and 24 Ju 88s, which operated directly against British shipping and ports. III./KG 40 also converted to the Fw 200 instead of the He 111, to allow it to operate further away from Britain and avoid air attack. Losses were disastrous for KG 40 in April. Seven Fw 200s and their crews were lost.

The British response to the Condors was simple but effective. Merchant ships were still lightly armed with anti-aircraft weapons. When a formation of German aircraft attacked, instead of staying formed in front of the convoy to protect against U-boats, they withdrew to the rear and formed a tight defensive circle. They then used all the available firepower they could muster to deter attacks. It worked when KG 40 attempted to attack HG 65 using the "Swedish turnip" method. The ships drove off the attack. The Germans lost two Fw 200s, one crashed in Portugal, the other in Spain. The Spanish allowed German technical teams to recover the aircraft and crew. OG 66 was also missed. By the end of June, only four ships (6,000 GRT) had been sunk for four losses.

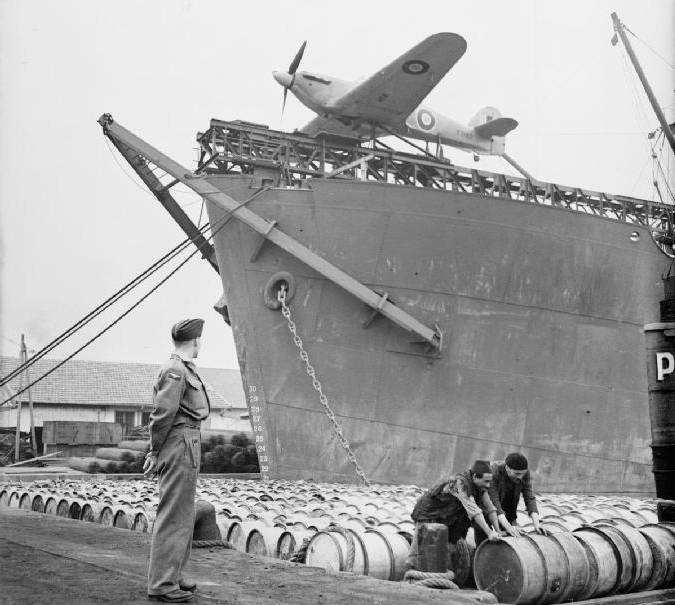
The Hawker Sea Hurricane W9182 on the catapult of a CAM ship

During the Bismarck's sortie Operation Rheinübung in May 1941, Fliegerführer Atlantik was ordered by Göring to provide cover for its return to port. Kampfgruppe 100, Kampfgeschwader 1, 54 and 77 were made available for this purpose. They failed and Bismarck was sunk. Fliegerführer Atlantik'ss commanding officer, Martin Harlinghausen, came in for much criticism for failing to help the ship. The sinking of Bismarck ended German surface vessel activity in the Atlantic for the remainder of the war. The Ju 88s and He 111s could not reach Bismarck, but did sink HMS Mashona and flew 158 sorties against warships.

The relations between the Kriegsmarine had hardly been improved with the failure of Rheinübung. Since 1937 Göring and the Luftwaffe had thwarted any attempt by the navy to produce a naval air arm. Not only did the Luftwaffe maintain control over all aspects of aviation, the naval commanders, Raeder and Dönitz, had to rely on Göring's good will. In order to have air support, the highest authorities in both services had to consult on the use of tactical units. Even if the negotiations were devoid of friction, it was inflexible and inefficient system.

In June 1941, the enemy's growing anti-submarine capabilities forced Dönitz to operate 20°W, beyond the range of the Condors, which now interdicted the sea lanes between Gibraltar and Britain. The command's aircraft were ordered to Bordeaux for this purpose by July. Dönitz' decision irritated Harlinghausen, who planned a major offensive in the summer and the relations between the two men cooled, only to warm again when the aircraft reverted to reconnaissance roles supporting U-boats—ironically because shipping defences had proven so successful Fw 200s could only attack when they had cloud cover. Gibraltar traffic was easier to monitor. The Fw 200s flew Fächer (Fan) search patterns from 45°N and 34°S and 19°W (sometimes 25°W) and found targets that way.

In July—December 1941, the success of Fliegerführer Atlantik was mixed. After a failed attack on HG 65, Harlinghausen ordered the abandonment of the "Swedish turnip" tactic since they were too vulnerable to improving British defensive armament. In July, the official orders of Fliegerführer Atlantik amounted authorisation for reconnaissance only. No attacks were to be made against convoys only individual ships could be attacked. They found four convoys for U-boats in July, but made no attacks themselves. On 18 July, Hauptmann Fritz Fliegel, a Knight's Cross of the Iron Cross holder, attempted to attack convoy OB 346. He targeted the 7,046-ton freighter Pilar de Larrinaga. However the gunners shot his starboard wing off and he crashed into the sea, killing all on board. Another Fw 200C-3 was shot down 400 km (250 mi) west of Ireland by a Lockheed Hudson of No. 233 Squadron RAF. The crew were rescued. In total, four Fw 200s were lost.

=== British countermeasures ===
On 2 August the British catapult concept was validated. From the CAM ship SS Maplin, Lieutenant Bob Everett took off in a Hawker Hurricane and succeeded in downing a Condor shadowing SL 81. KG 40 had some revenge when a Condor sank a freighter, and a U-boat attack sank five more ships from the 20-strong convoy on 5 August. British defences forced the Fw 200s to revert to reconnaissance. However, a major battle developed over several separate convoys; Convoy HG 73 and HG 74 in September. HG 73 was composed of 25 merchantmen and 11 escorts including HMS Springbank, a catapult ship. A Fairey Fulmar launched but could not fire. Without air cover the convoy was subjected to attack by sea and air. The Condors guided the submarines in and the U-boats sank 10 ships, including Springbank. Simultaneously, the battle for HG 74 began. This convoy had 26 ships and ten escorts including the first escort carrier to be built—HMS Audacity. A Fw 200 sank a ship picking up survivors from a U-boat attack (Walmer Castle). The attack alerted two fighters, which dispatched the Condor. Remaining Condors kept their distance. They soon picked up OG 75. Despite poor weather and improved defences, the Condors shadowed OG 75 eight days. But the strong escort limited the attacks to one loss. HG 74 made it to Liverpool from Gibraltar without loss. Convoy OG 69 and Convoy OG 71 were also savaged by a combined air and submarine attack. The cooperation accounted for 45 percent of the tonnage sunk by U-boats from July to October.

The Fw 200s proceeded with caution after the Audacity battle. Four U-boats had been lost and the effectiveness of fighter defences improved. Successes declined and losses rose to 13 aircraft—10 to British defences. Production failures placed increased strain on pilots. They were ordered not to ditch but to fly home and save the damaged aircraft. One pilot flew across neutral Ireland to reach Brest. New aircraft were collected from the factories immediately upon completion. Decreasing sparse forces further, Harlinghausen sent Condors and their pilots on torpedo bomber courses, which failed to yield positive results. The power of ship-based anti-aircraft fire and escorts forced the Condors to fly higher. The introduction of carrier fighters forced them to operate with extreme caution.

In October, Martin Harlinghausen himself was wounded. Although unusual for a commander, he took part in operations to experience combat conditions for himself. In an attack on shipping in the Bristol Channel, he was wounded. His deputy Ulrich Kessler temporarily took command. Kessler had not held high rank before now, an indicator of how unimportant the OKL viewed Luftwaffe operations over the Atlantic.

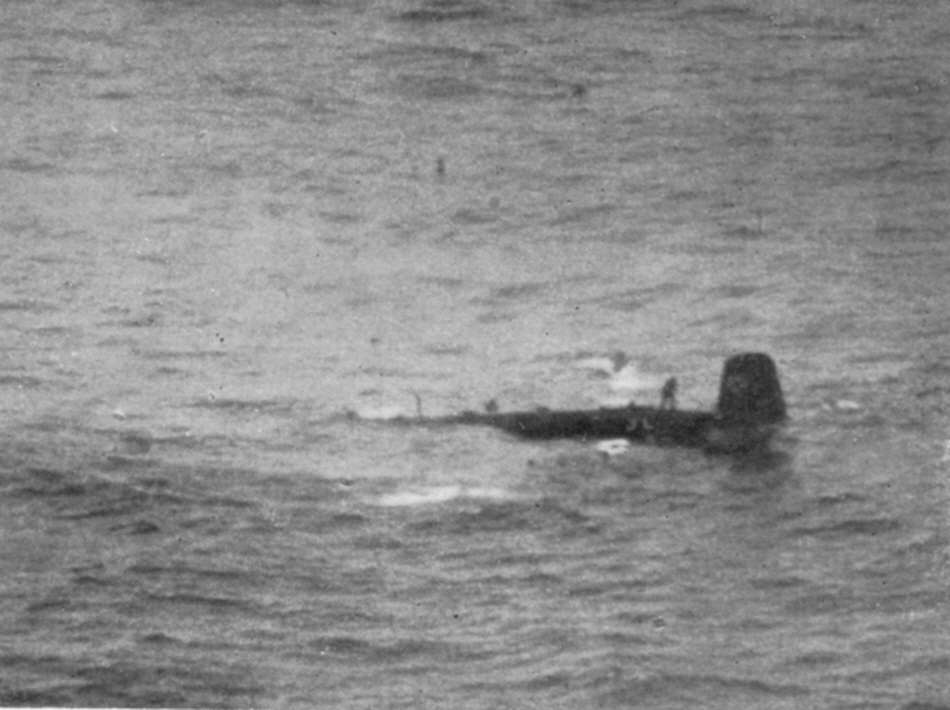
A Condor sinking. Airmen are exiting the aircraft, 26 July 1941, 54°00′N 13°35′W.

On 6 November, the units of Fliegerführer Atlantik engaged OG 76 in a month-long battle, which lasted until 16 December. The convoy had left Liverpool bound for Gibraltar on 28 October. Sighted by KG 40 on 6 November, six Fw 200s were to shadow and direct U-boats to it. HMS Audacity was present, and launched her fighters against the Condors, downing one Fw 200. Five U-boats were guided in, but were repulsed by the escorts and the convoy which made it to Gibraltar unscathed. On 14 December it returned to Liverpool. By 16 December, KG 40 had picked it up. The U-boats were repulsed again, and the Fw 200s were forced to retreat under fighter attack on 18 December. On 19 December, two Condors were lost to Audacity's fighters. With the Condors out of the battle, the U-Boats tried on their own, sinking one destroyer and two merchant ships. On 21 December, Audacity was spotted outside the convoy and was sunk in ten minutes. Five of her six fighter pilots from No. 802 Squadron FAA were saved. With the carrier gone, the Condors returned. They noted the presence of an RAF B-24 Liberator, but no engagement is known.

The British responded to German submarine operations by attacking them as the transited the Bay of Biscay. Five out of six U-boats took this route, and passed within range of RAF air bases. Coastal Command resolved to interdict these routes. From June to November 1941 and was known as the "First Bay Offensive". In the period, 1 September to 30 November, 3,600 flying hours were made, producing 31 sightings, 28 attacks, which possible heavily damaged only five U-boats. The only victim of the offensive was U-206, sunk by a No. 502 Squadron RAF aircraft guided by ASR.

On 11 December 1941 Hitler declared war on the United States. While this gave German submarines plenty of targets, the order to send more vessels to American waters made less U-Boats available for cooperation with Fliegerführer Atlantik. Between 1 August 1940 and 31 December 1941, Fw 200s made 41 contacts with convoys, 18 were exploited by U-Boats that sank 48 merchant ships (129,771 GRT), along with two destroyers, a corvette and Audacity. Harlinghausen frequently complained that his Condors had succeeded in finding convoys only for no U-boat attacks to take place. The cause was the lack of any U-boats in position to exploit the finding; a fact Dönitz did not relay to Fliegerführer Atlantik.

The last six months of 1941 had been a severe blow to Fliegerführer Atlantik. It had sunk just four ships (10,298 tons) and damaged two for the loss of 16 Condors, including seven to convoy defences. The carrier ship had validated the concept of the escort carrier, which the Admiralty pursued with interest. The air war over the Atlantic and battle for Britain's sea communications had turned against the Germans in this period. From 15 March to 31 October 1941 Fliegerführer Atlantik reported 57 convoys. Through cooperation with U-boats 74 ships, totalling 390,000 tons, one aircraft carrier, and one destroyer were sunk. The command sank 161 vessels for 903,000 grt, probably sank seven for 31,000 grt, damaged 113 for 590,000 grt. Within six months, this trend underwent a radical change. The transfer of Condors to other theatres, according to OKL wartime report, in mid-December 1941 brought air-submarine cooperation to "a standstill". The only remaining naval reconnaissance outfit—KüFlGr 106—did not have the range to reach deep into the Atlantic and were restricted to coastal attacks and observation operations.

=== 1942: Second Happy Time ===
Hitler's declaration of war against the United States on 11 December 1941, in support of his Axis partner, the Empire of Japan, opened up the western Atlantic and American shipping to U-boats which had previously been ordered to avoid contact with the then-neutral Americans. The decision provided immediate tactical advantages against the unprepared Americans along the East Coast of the United States. The campaign became known as the "Second Happy Time" to U-boat crews, but not to Fliegerführer Atlantik.

On 5 January 1942, Harlinghausen was replaced by Ulrich Kessler. Kessler endured the same supply problems as his predecessor. He was unable to support the U-boats on the west side of the Atlantic, nor interdict convoy routes while anti-shipping operations turned to the Mediterranean and Arctic Convoys. Italian-designed aerial torpedoes (F5a) had proven successful in the Regia Aeronautica (Royal Italian Air Force) and in the Luftwaffe, but these weapons were given to KG 26 and other units operating against shipping in the Mediterranean Sea and against the Arctic convoys off Norway. Over the course of these unfolding events from 26 July 1941 to 30 April 1942, Fliegerführer Atlantik shrank from 90 to 16 combat aircraft and from 25 to 20 Fw 200s. During the "happy time", known as Operation Drumbeat, Hitler remained steadfast in his view that the priorities of German air power remained elsewhere as the naval staff pressed for more Fw 200s and the newer Heinkel He 177.

As the new war developed, III./KG 40 was converting from the He 111 to the Fw 200. A number of the Condors were abruptly sent to the Mediterranean and to take up transport operations on the Eastern Front. Condor operations fell to the lowest recorded through 1942, until 1943. Anti-shipping operations in British coastal waters continued into 1942 and extended into the Irish Sea. Ju 88 and Do 217 aircraft from Luftflotte 3 took part, on occasion with torpedoes. Minelaying continued, but their operations were handled by Fliegerkorps X against Kessler's protests to have all such units under his command. Even so, Fliegerkorps X lost bomber units—such as KG 2—to the bombing campaign over Britain. Coastal operations were costly—in April 1941 III./KG 40 had been withdrawn when only eight of the 32 aircraft it was authorised were left. New weapons platforms were considered for torpedo operations; even the Focke-Wulf Fw 190 fighter underwent testing. By early 1942, the majority of torpedo-equipped units had moved for operations in the Arctic Ocean or Mediterranean. The last were removed by Göring with Hitler's approval on 21 April amid protests from Raeder. They were scheduled to return in July 1942. The development of the aerial torpedo remained in the hands of the Kriegsmarine, and it was not until 1941 the Luftwaffe was finally granted jurisdiction and proceeded with urgency thus the first two years of war were wasted and little progress had been made.

The command's order of battle consisted of only Stab. I., II., III./KG 40, Küstenfliegergruppe 106, and 5./BordFlGr 196. The latter was a simple Ar 196 floatplane staffel on 10 July 1942. Kessler lamented the misuse of naval aircraft in bombing operations against Britain. In 1942, he wrote of the Baedeker Blitz;

My impression in the majority of cases, the aim of our sorties at present is more to placate the High Command than to cause any serious discomfort to the enemy. Of, for example, bombs dropped on English country houses where dances are taking place, there is little possibility of killing anyone of importance, since Churchill doesn't dance, and other prominent personalities are generally beyond the age for such relaxation.

In 1942 the Western Approaches and Bay of Biscay attracted the command's operations. The operational strength of Kessler's forces were very low and only reconnaissance missions could be carried out and attacks on coastal shipping when weather permitted when RAF Fighter Command could not intervene. In mid-1942, Fliegerführer Atlantik could field only 40 Ju 88s whereas the mine-laying Fliegerkorps IX had 90 Do 217s on its order of battle. Flag Officer of U-boats, Dönitz, once again began placing demands on the fleet's forces. He requested defensive operations and reconnaissance missions to protect his submarines in transit from French ports in Saint-Nazaire, Bordeaux, Brest, Lorient and La Pallice to the Atlantic Ocean. RAF Coastal Command heavy fighters and anti-submarine aircraft were causing anxiety over the Bay and appeared to be intensifying operations against surfaced U-boats.

These operations made up the majority of command operations. In June 1942, a permanent tactical solution appeared to counter British operations in the Bay. A specialist heavy fighter unit, V./KG 40, equipped with the Ju 88C was formed at Bordeaux-Merignac on 24 June. 13 and 14 staffel on 6 and 20 August and 15 staffel on 12 September using crews from IV/KG 6. The unit claimed a Short Sunderland on 1 September and another four aircraft on 15 September. On 1 December the group had 30 Ju 88Cs. The unit did not have a full complement of aircraft for two months and at the end of the year it had 27, with eight lost in combat.

From May 1942, heavy fighter units equipped with Ju 88s succeeded in driving Coastal Command into the Atlantic until the following year. Ḍönitz employed this way against standing orders from Hitler to use them for convoy reconnaissance and attacks over the Bay. In August 1942 Coastal Command lost 26 aircraft—7 to German fighters. In September 1942 the new combat unit accounted for eight aircraft. Nevertheless, air raids on bases and transit routes cost the Germans the equivalent of 15-sea months in delays without sinking any U-boats. In the last six months of 1942, the Luftwaffe made 70 interceptions claiming 22 aircraft. Coastal Command lost a total of 98 to all causes.

The consequence of the lack of convoy reconnaissance and combat aircraft is evident in the statistics. In 1942, just three merchant ships were sunk by aircraft in the Atlantic amounting to 3,588 grt; the last in June 1942. In other theatres, German aircraft sank 19 in British waters, 41 in the Arctic and 31 in the Mediterranean. In contrast, Kessler's airmen claimed 43,000 grt including a destroyer and an Auxiliary cruiser—13 ships in all. Over a seven-week period, a daily average of six combat aircraft which operated between 38° and 49° north and 10° to 20° west, observed 4 million tons of shipping and spotted approximately 0.3 million tons of warships. The convoy remained in range of long-range bombers from five to six days. Approximately one-seventh of Allied shipping was in range of long-range aircraft. The sightings rarely led to attacks on ships for most of the aircraft were not armed with bombs.

Technical developments in 1942 made high altitude bombing attacks possible. In the summer, the Lotfernrohr 7Ds were installed on the Fw 200. III./KG 40 converted to the sight in the spring, 1943 an achieved considerable success. With well trained crews the Luftwaffe could achieve a measure of success at acceptable cost. Air-to-surface radar may have helped detect convoys from greater distance, and thus, with greater safety, but the installation progress was slow. The FuG Atlas Hohentwiel had been fitted to a Fw 200C-3/U3 in July 1941. Later, FuG Neptun-S (136 MHz) was trialled off Norway but both proved disappointing when compared to a captured 200MHz British metric Air-to-surface MK II radar. FuG Rostock was operating at 120 MHz with 30 km range but production and development allowed for the installation for only five Fw 200s by November 1942—one being the captured set. In the autumn, 1942, development of the FuG 200 Hohentwiel 550 MHz with a range of 80 km. The small antennas did not degrade the performance of the aircraft. They type entered service in the Fw 200C-6. The low priority of Kessler's command resulted in just 16 of 26 Condors in III./KG 40 were fitted out by December 1943, four months after it entered service.

=== 1943: the living corpse ===
At the turn of the year more of the precious FW 200s were diverted to other theatres. Operation Torch, the landings in Morocco, Algeria and Tunisia absorbed more anti-shipping forces from Western Europe. On the Eastern Front, the Battle of Stalingrad led to the encirclement of several Axis armies and FW 200s, with other long range types, were required to supply land forces trapped in the city.

The command was briefly supplemented with the new Kampfgeschwader 6 (KG 6), but Kessler soon learned he was to lose this wing. In a conversation with Hans Jeschonnek, chief of the general staff, Kessler recommended Fliegerführer Atlantik, which he described as "a living corpse", be disbanded. Kessler continued to protest against the diversion of aircraft to bombing Britain and the failure to increase the command to Fliegerdivision. Kessler demanded torpedo aircraft and radar with high altitude bomb sights. Kessler told Jeschonnek that sinking Allied convoys was the only way to render American and British industrial superiority irrelevant.

The defensive air war over the Bay of Biscay intensified during 1943. The Luftwaffe could rarely provide adequate aircraft to protect U-boats in 1943. The air superiority operations became counterproductive for the signals traffic alerted the British to German operations. German radar operators plotted 2,070 aircraft intrusions over the Bay during the spring.

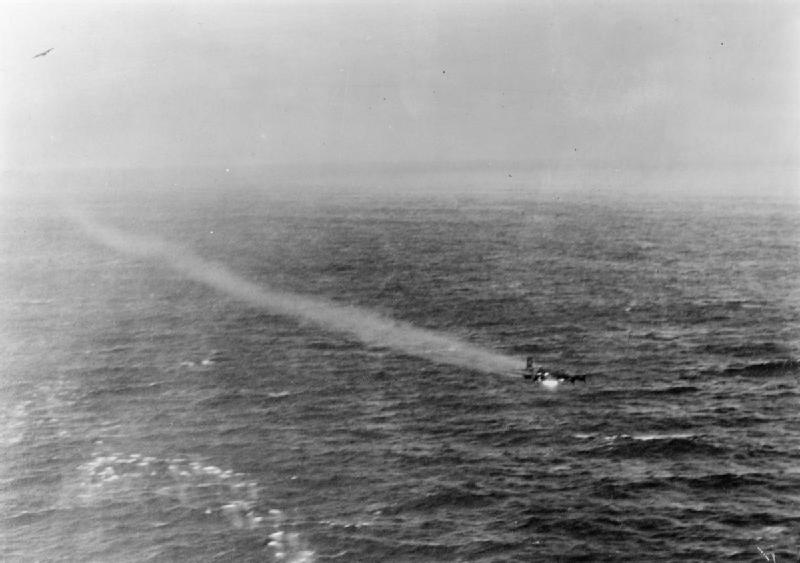
7./KG 40 Fw 200 on fire, pursued by a Bristol Beaufighter aircraft from No. 248 Squadron RAF, 12 March 1943

In February 1943, John Slessor Air Officer Commanding, Coastal Command, preferred attacking German vessels in the Bay of Biscay, in transit to the Atlantic. Slessor assigned No. 19 Group RAF to attack them and Operation Gondola, lasting from 4 to 16 February 1943, mounted 300 sorties. It achieved 19 sightings and eight attacks but only U-519 was sunk. The addition of ASV radar to Coastal Command squadrons enabled the British to attack undetected until a Short Stirling bomber was shot down over Rotterdam, enabling the Germans to develop counter measures. Supplemented by Leigh Lights, Coastal Command posed a danger to submarines. Operation Enclose (20–28 March 1943) detected 26 of 41 U-boats passing through the Bay and resulted in 15 attacks but only U-665 was sunk. Operation Enclose II (6 to 13 April) sighted 11 and attacked four of the 25 submarines passing through, sinking U-376. Operation Derange followed when 19 Group deployed 70 ASV III equipped B-24 Liberators, Vickers Wellingtons and Handley Page Halifax aircraft. U-526 became the only casualty, sunk by a mine, the operation ending on 30 April 1943. The Command had flown 80,443 hours, lost 170–179 aircraft, sunk 10 submarines and damaged 24. German fighters achieved one aerial victory in April 1943, albeit without recording any losses.

From 3 June 1943, V./KG 40 increased fighter patrols prompting RAF Fighter Command to send flights of four de Havilland Mosquito long range aircraft to protect Coastal Command patrols. V./KG 2 began converting from the Do 217 to Messerschmitt Me 410 for fighter operations. U-boat command ordered all submarines to travel in groups of three to four in daylight on the surface through the Bay and to fight it out with their powerful anti-aircraft artillery if intercepted. OKL placed faith in the Ju 88C-6, then R-2 fighters, to hold off the air attacks. ZG 1 was transferred to the Bay of Biscay in July but unsustainable losses were suffered reducing the number of experienced crews, affecting morale. In "Black May", 1943, ZG 1 was called into action with greater frequency as the U-boats were driven from the Atlantic Gap. The lack of combat training was exposed and losses rose. A notable incident was the death of film star, Leslie Howard, killed when shot own by a Ju 88 from V./KG 40. Five fighters were lost in May 1943, a further four in June to 11 in July. In August and September 1943 five aircraft were lost in each month. The size of Fliegerführer Atlantik remained minuscule. On 10 July 1943 V./KG 40 and III./KG 40 were the only Gruppen (wings) available. 1./SAGr 128 with Ar 196 and FW 190 with Aufklstaffel (see) 222 were squadron-size strength units; the latter possessed Blohm & Voss BV 222.

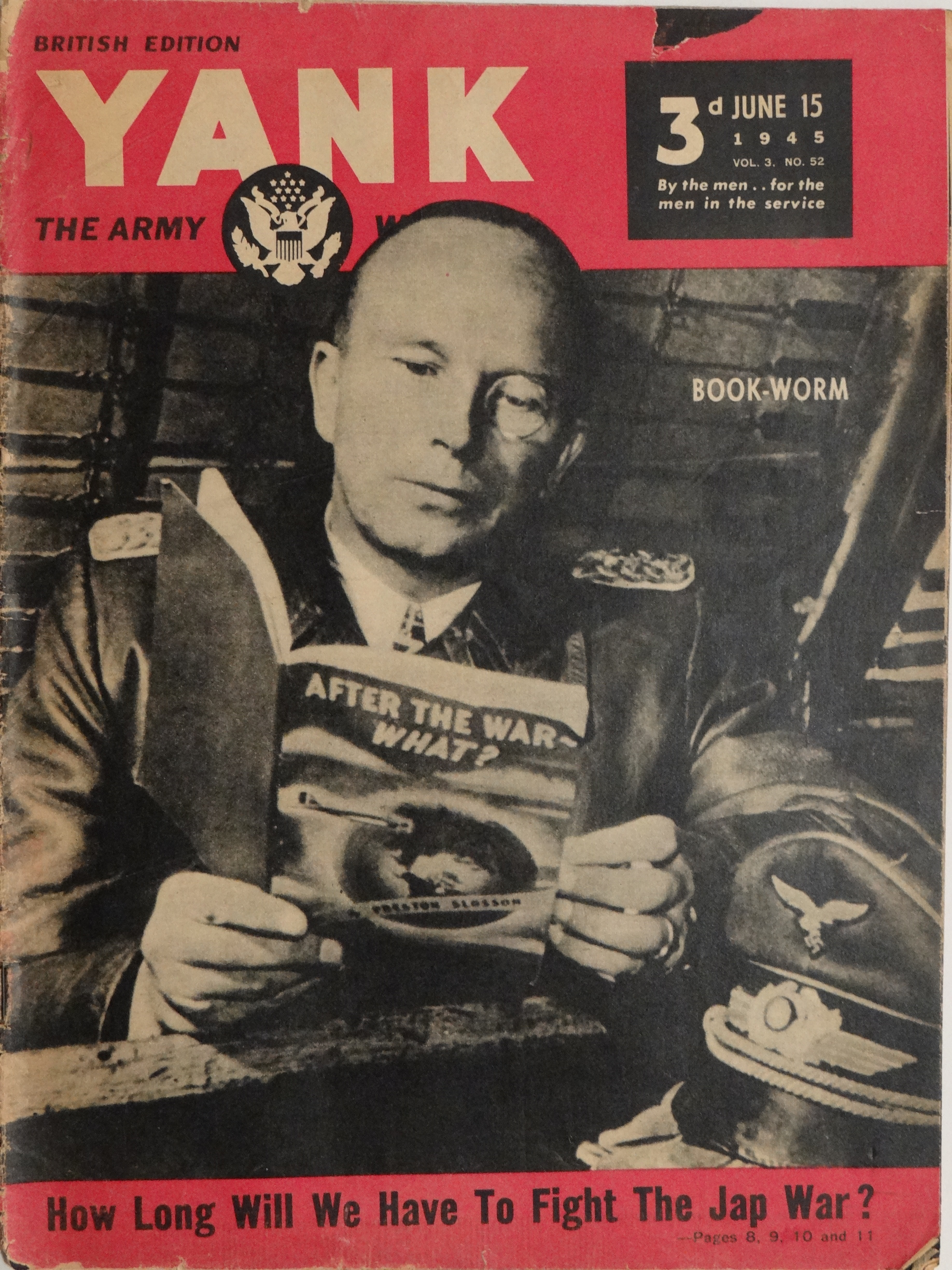
Ulrich Kessler in 1945. In 1942, he called Fliegerführer Atlantik "a living corpse".

In February 1943, with the battle of the Atlantic reaching a climax, Dönitz demanded long-range aircraft from Göring but was rebuffed. Hitler intervened and ordered six Blohm & Voss BV 222 into the Atlantic but they did not become available until the summer because of the procrastination of the general staff. Only four Junkers Ju 290s and ten modified Ju 88H aircraft were made available before the defeat of U-boats in Black May. Kessler intended to use the BV 222s in 24-hour flights over the Atlantic where they could refuel from U-boat tankers at the Azores. Göring informed Dönitz that the He 177 could not be made available before the autumn but the Messerschmitt Me 264 Amerika-Bomber had made its maiden flight eight weeks before and was still under development. Kessler had support from Sperrle, who optimistically told him that he hoped to create a new Fliegerkorps III, with 22 Gruppen Kessler remarked that with such a fleet he could destroy 500,000 tons of shipping. In mid-March 1943, the Condor force had doubled to 39 aircraft although they could fly no more than 100 sorties per month.

Dönitz came close to severing the shipping lanes in March 1943. His U-boats sank 108 ships for some 627,377 grt this months, with just eight percent of those in cooperation with aircraft. During the first quarter of 1943 only six convoys were shadowed. The 74,954 grt sunk in coordination with the Luftwaffe in 1943, 85 percent were sunk in March. These achievements were mostly in connection with attacks on convoys XK 2 and Convoy HX 126. SL 126 was picked up only late in the month, over 27–30 March. The convoy's predecessor SL 125 had been so badly mauled the Sierra Leone route was abandoned for four months. The battle was the last major action until Convoy HX 133. XK 2 consisted of 20 ships protected by the 38th Escort Group—a highly experienced flotilla—was spotted by an Fw 200 and attacked by Do 217s from I./KG 40. Only one ship was slightly damaged and one U-boat lost when the Condor called a local wolfpack into action. After March, only 14 convoys were reported while none were spotted in June 1943. With the Atlantic clear of German aircraft, Coastal Command carried out Anti-submarine warfare operations in the Bay of Biscay. The Fw 200s continued patrolling, often in formation for added protection against marauding Beaufighters but also Liberators, B-17 Flying Fortress and Short Sunderlands.

Kessler's frustration mounted and on 4 May 1943 he wrote to Jeschonnek claiming more than 3.75 million grt of shipping was escaping interception on the Gibraltar lanes. Kessler requested the He 177 and Henschel Hs 293 guided missiles with which he confidently predicted the monthly destruction of 500,000 grt of shipping. Hitler sympathised in general and falsely insisted the He 177 delays had been entirely caused by the insistence of installing dive bombing capabilities. Even so, on 31 May 1943 Hitler said there could no let-up in the Atlantic for it was his first line of defence. State Secretary Erhard Milch, production supremo, sympathised but the equipment was not yet available.

The Lofte 7D bombsight did make a difference to Fw 200 operations. The aircraft could now bomb accurately to within 20 to 30 metres from an altitude of 4,000 metres (13,000 ft). III./KG 40 used the device in 42 attacks—26 on convoys—and claimed 11 ships sunk for 79,050 grt from 23 February—1 October. On 11 July 1943 five aircraft intercepted Convoy Faith. Liners SS Duchess of York and California were sunk. The freighter MV Port Fairy escaped toward Casablanca but the following evening was pursued and damaged by two Fw 200s. Accurate high level bombing allowed for the success but it was to be a rare occurrence. On 15 August 1943, 21 of the newly arrived Fw 200C-6 aircraft armed with Hs 293 radio controlled missiles attacked convoy OS53/KMS 23. The convoy was spotted by Fw 200s which reported the position some 220 miles west of Lisbon. The attack was a disaster and 17 of the 21 aircraft were lost in combat. Two ships, the Baron Fairlie and Ocean Faith were sunk in return.

In September 1943, Göring ordered Fliegerführer Atlantik to direct and control long-range maritime reconnaissance operations. He also ordered them to carry out air superiority, anti-shipping, and to assist in anti-submarines operations by detecting enemy submarines. Göring apparently recognising the importance of using aircraft in the Atlantic, remarked, German "submarines and aircraft were pursuing the same aim and Fliegerführer Atlantik should therefore cooperate closely with BdU. Although limited forces are available at present, considerable success could be achieved." At the time of the order, the command possessed just one Bv 222, 19 Fw 200s (four operational), 61 Ju 88C-6s (37 operational), six Ju 290s, and 24 He 177s. The supposed strength of the command in II./KG 40 was 30 He 177s, 45 in II./KG 40 alone. 1.(F)./SAGr 128 were supposed to have four Ar 196 and five Fw 190s for fighter operations based in Brest, 1.(F)./SAGr 129 were allotted two Bv 222s and two Blohm & Voss BV 138s. 1. and 2./ZG 1 were permitted 40 Ju 88C and Rs. The BdU signalled its U-boat commanders that newer aircraft were available. In particular, the Ju 290—FuG 200 equipped—reconnaissance aircraft, which had a range of 2,250 km (approximately 1,400 mi) was greeted with enthusiasm.

In the autumn, 1943 Dönitz had conceded defeat in the North Atlantic. He moved his U-boats to parts of the ocean where his commanders faced fewer disadvantages. The Gibraltar convoys sailing to Britain presented such an opportunity—particularly the SL convoys. Fliegerführer Atlantik bases in France were well within range of the convoy routes. Befehlshaber der U-Boote (BdU) was certain that U-boat operations would fail if the Luftwaffe continued to avoid allocating aircraft to air protection of submarines and air reconnaissance. The unwillingness of Luftwaffe was in sharp contrast to Allied air forces. Only one attempt to use aircraft in cooperation with U-boats in October 1943 was against Convoy SC 143. The single BV 222, one of very few in operation did not succeed in bringing the Wolfpacks to interception. The BV 222 reached the convoy but not a single U-boat picked up the homing signals. Seven Allied aircraft were in operation over the convoy and at least one U-boat was sunk by air attack. An Fw 200 played a role in locating Convoy SL 140/MKS 31, but the interception was a failure.

In October 1943, cooperation against Convoy SL 138/MKS 28 and MKS 29 failed—one ship was sunk at the cost of U-306 and U-707. The naval staff, as usual, blamed the lack of adequate of reconnaissance and combat aircraft to hold off Allied naval air power. In mid-November Dönitz moved 26 U-boats into position to intercept the next convoy. He placed six more in reserve. Three daily flights were ordered to cover them. The British learned through Ultra, on 14 November, that Dönitz intended to use a defence in depth to catch the convoy in three patrol lines. The subsequent Convoy SL 139/MKS 30 defeated the German attacks. Night attacks were disrupted by ASR and Leigh Light Wellingtons from No. 179 Squadron RAF. Two Junkers Ju 290s from FAGr 5 (Fernaufklärungsgruppe) shadowed the convoy while Fw 200s from KG 40 were involved in bombing the convoy from high altitudes. KG 40 committed the He 177 with Hs 293 radio-controlled missiles for the first time. The 4,045 grt Marsa, built in 1928, was left burning, but only one of her 50-man crew was killed. The freighter Delius was damaged, but that was all the 25-strong He 177 force could accomplish. The ships avoided the missiles through rapid manoeuvres and flares. 25 of the 40 Hs 293s failed upon deployment.

In December 1943, Fliegerführer Atlantik fought defensive battles against Operation Stonewall, an air and sea operation to interdict German merchant ships and blockade runners. The Kriegsmarine sent destroyers to meet and escort them to port under air cover. The operation was not immediately successful until 28 December 1943, and the Battle of the Bay of Biscay. A FW 200 crew attempted to sink British warships but was unsuccessful. The battles proved difficult and the Fw 200s vulnerable; November and December saw the loss of valuable crews and aircraft.

=== Defeat and dissolution: 1944 ===
The long-range aircraft BdU had long since requested was met in the Ju 290, which could carry bombs and guided missiles. The aircraft had limited performance but the crews found it comfortable and straightforward to fly. Proposals were made to increase the number of aircraft from 86 to 174 but this came at the price of reducing Fw 190 production and it was ultimately shelved. On 6 January 1944 Kessler informed Seekriegsleitung (SKL—Maritime Warfare Command) that the 31 December 1943 air raids stemming from the Combined Bomber Offensive had decimated the airfields at Bordeaux–Mérignac Airport, Cognac – Châteaubernard Air Base, Landes De Bussac and Saint-Jean-d'Angély. III./KG 40 was shattered and non-operational for five weeks. All Fw 200s were unavailable for operations. Fliegerführer Atlantik estimated that only five Ju 290s, three Ju 88s and two Bv 222s by 20 January 1944. The cooperation this month, while attempted, produced no success. BdU's war diary was critical of the FuG 200's reliability.

On 10 February 1944 Fliegerführer Atlantik achieved a final success when I./KG 40 sank El Grillo in Seyðisfjörður. The ship was the only one sunk by German aircraft in the Atlantic in 1944. Kessler was dispirited by the state of his unḍer resourceḍ command. He sought an audience with Hitler but failed. Kessler's views were well known in the OKL. Göring was attuned to criticism at the higher levels since Dönitz had lambasted the lack of air support in front of Hitler for some time. Embarrassed by his subordinates complaints, Kessler became another command casualty of Germany's deteriorating military situation. On 7 February 1944, Fliegerführer Atlantik was formally dissolved. The deletion of the command from Luftflotte 3 was kept from Kessler until 28 February.

The feeble forces formerly under Kessler's command were sent to other units. KG 40 was assigned to Fliegerkorps X in March 1944. Fernaufklärungsgruppe 5 followed suit. Each combat unit remained in France until the end of the Normandy Campaign in August 1944 and ensuing withdrawal into Germany. Luftwaffe forces sank just 16 ships in the Atlantic from January 1943 to May 1944. The six of the 15 sunk in 1943 came in July 1943. The total for the year totalled 121, 520 grt. The single ship sunk in 1944, in February, amounted to 7,264 grt.

== Commanding officers ==
- Generalleutnant Martin Harlinghausen, 31 March 1941 – 5 January 1942
- Generalmajor Wolfgang von Wild (acting), 30 October 1941 – 5 January 1942
- General der Flieger Ulrich Kessler, 5 January 1942 – 1 April 1944
