= Luftwaffe order of battle April 1940 =

For its campaign against Norway and Denmark during World War II, the German Luftwaffe had the following order of battle on 9 April 1940.

== X. Fliegerkorps ==
Commanded by Generalleutnant Hans Geisler

| Parent unit | Geschwader Base | Unit (Gruppe/Staffel) | Aircraft type | Commanding officer |
|---|---|---|---|---|
| Jagdgeschwader 77 | Husum | II. Gruppe | Messerschmitt Bf 109E | Hauptmann Karl Hentschel |
| Zerstörergeschwader 26 | Barth | I, II. Gruppe | Messerschmitt Bf 110C | Hauptmann Karl Kaschka/ Wilhelm Makrocki |
| Zerstörergeschwader 76 | Westerland | I. Gruppe | Messerschmitt Bf 110C | |
| Zerstörergeschwader 1 | Westerland | III. Gruppe | Messerschmitt Bf 110C | |
| Kampfgeschwader 4 | Fassberg | Stab, and II. Gruppe | Heinkel He 111 | |
| Kampfgeschwader 4 | Perleberg | I. Gruppe | Heinkel He 111 | |
| Kampfgeschwader 4 | Lüneburg | III. Gruppe | Heinkel He 111 | |
| Kampfgeschwader 26 | Varel | Stab, and I. Gruppe | Heinkel He 111 | |
| Kampfgeschwader 26 | Marx | II. Gruppe | Heinkel He 111 | |
| KGr100 | Nordholz | | Heinkel He 111 | |
| Kampfgeschwader 30 | Westerland | Stab, I., II., III., and Z. Gruppe | Heinkel He 111 | |
| Sturzkampfgeschwader 1 | Kiel-Holtena | I. Gruppe | Junkers Ju 87B and R | Major Paul-Werner Hozzel |
| 1.(F)/Aufklärungs-Gruppe 122 | Hamburg–Fuhlsbüttel | I. Gruppe | Heinkel He 111 | |
| Wetterkette | Hamburg-Fuhlsbüttel | | Heinkel He 111 | |
| Korpstransportstaffel | Hamburg-Fuhlsbüttel | | Junkers Ju 52 | |
| 1.(F)/Aufklärungs-Gruppe 120 | Lübeck/Kiel | | Dornier Do 17 and Heinkel He 111 | |

== See also ==
- Luftwaffe Organization
- German Air Fleets in World War II

=== Bibliography ===
- Hooton, E.R (2007). Luftwaffe at War; Blitzkrieg in the West: Volume 2. London: Chevron/Ian Allan. ISBN 978-1-85780-272-6.
