= Martin Harlinghausen =

German general (1902–1986)

- Born: 17 January 1902; Rheda, German Empire
- Died: 22 March 1986 (aged 84); Gütersloh, West Germany
- Military career
- Allegiance: Weimar Republic; Nazi Germany; West Germany
- Branch: Reichsmarine; Luftwaffe; German Air Force
- Service years: 1923–1945; 1957–1961
- Rank: Generalleutnant
- Nickname: "Iron Gustav"
- Unit: Fliegerkorps X
- Commands: Fliegerführer Atlantik; Fliegerführer Tunesien; Fliegerkorps II
- Conflicts: See battles Spanish Civil War World War II: Battle of Denmark; Norwegian Campaign; Western Front; Siege of Malta (World War II); Battle of France; Battle of the Atlantic; North African Campaign
- Awards: Knight's Cross of the Iron Cross with Oak Leaves; Spanish Cross in Gold with Swords and Diamonds

Martin Harlinghausen (17 January 1902 – 22 March 1986) was a German military aviator and general. Harlinghausen specialised in maritime interdiction and anti-warship operations. During World War II Harlinghausen was the leading exponent of anti-ship warfare with the destruction of 22 ships credited to him.

Born in 1902 Harlinghausen joined the Reichsmarine, the Weimar navy. In 1931 he transitioned from sailor to pilot. After formation of the Third Reich in 1933, Harlinghausen was compelled to join the Luftwaffe. In 1936 he was selected to command an anti-shipping unit in the Condor Legion and subsequently served in the Spanish Civil War. Harlinghausen developed effective combat tactics and was highly decorated by Nationalist Spain. Harlinghausen was appointed chief of staff of the anti-shipping Fliegerkorps X in 1939.

During World War II Harlinghausen flew combat missions even while a staff officer. On 5 May 1940 he was awarded the Knight's Cross of the Iron Cross for commanding anti-shipping units in the Norwegian Campaign. In mid–1940 Fliegerkorps X transferred to German-occupied France. The command supported the Kriegsmarine in the Battle of the Atlantic and the Battle of Britain. In January 1941 he was awarded the Oak Leaves to the Knight's Cross. In February 1941, Harlinghausen was appointed commanding officer of the newly established Fliegerführer Atlantik. Harlinghausen lobbied hard for the expansion of his forces but other military theatres received priority. In October 1941 he was wounded in action while attacking a convoy leaving the command leaderless.

On 5 January 1942 Ulrich Kessler replaced Harlinghausen. Harlinghausen was simultaneously appointed Geschwaderkommodore of Kampfgeschwader 26 and Bevollmächtigter for das Lufttorpedowesen (Plenipotentiary for airborne torpedoes). In January 1943 Harlinghausen was given command of Fliegerkorps II and relieved five months later on 10 June. He returned to duty in October 1943 as chief of staff to the General der Kampfflieger. His last command was Luftgau XIV from 21 August 1944 through to April 1945. During the appointment Harlinghausen was promoted to Generalleutnant on 1 December 1944.

Harlinghausen was captured in 1945 and remained a prisoner of war until 1947. He served in the Bundesluftwaffe from 1957 to 1961. Harlinghausen either resigned his commission or was forced into retirement after disputes with superiors.

== Early life ==
Harlinghausen was born in Rheda, the German Empire in 1902. Son of industrialist Wilhelm Harlinghausen (1866–1942) and Therese Zurmühlen. He married Inge Ruhenstroth in 1940. Harlinghausen received his elementary and secondary education in 1922. After completing his Abitur he studied law for one semester at the University of Göttingen.

He joined the Reichsmarine (German Navy) on 1 April 1923 and trained on torpedo boats. In 1931 Harlinghausen began pilot training. He received his commission as Leutnant zur See in 1927 and the Oberleutnant zur See in 1929. With the Nazi seizure of power, and the founding of the Third Reich, he transferred to the Luftwaffe, the aerial warfare branch of the Wehrmacht (Nazi German Armed Forces) in October 1933. At this time Harlinghausen held the lowly rank of Leutnant zur See (Lt zS or LZS). In 1934 he began work as an instructor in training schools. After training as an observer in October 1934 he joined the training section of the Reichsluftfahrtministerium. At the ministry became an associate of Hans Geisler. The two men became the foremost anti-shipping experts in Germany. He served at the Air War academy at Berlin–Gatow for much of 1935 through to 1937.

Harlinghausen served under Geisler at Warnemünde naval base in 1931. Harlinghausen was given command of 1 seestaffel in 1937, an elevated to the position of Staffelkapitän. In October 1937 he was appointed to command küsten mehrzweck staffel 3./506 (coastal squadron of the 506th air group).

=== Spanish Civil War ===
In January 1938, Harlinghausen, then ranked as Hauptmann (Captain) took command of AS/88 (Seefliegerstaffel—sea flying squadron), an anti-shipping unit in the Condor Legion in Pollensa, Mallorca The frequency of bombing operations against merchant ships increased under his command. The squadron had been engaged in the Spanish Civil War since its outbreak. The main weapon of this unit was the Heinkel He 59. From January 1937 the type began experimenting with air-dropped torpedoes against transport and warships. Harlinghausen expanded the target list to include coastal communications with bombs and small-arms fire. Harlinghausen preferred the He 59 for the aircraft's ability to sustain severe damage and remain airborne. On one such mission over Barcelona, the aircraft was damaged by the blast from the bombs he had just dropped. The He 59 survive with a twisted fuselage and the lower wings broken in several places.

Under his direction AS/88 developed ship and coastal-attack tactics. A particularly well-used approach against land targets was to fly at high altitude with engines switched off, then dive and release the bombs at 1,000 ft (300 metres), then start the engines for a hasty departure. By August 1938 16 sorties per week were flown, in small formations of three with each aircraft carrying a ton of bombs. 12 He 59s were lost in 1938 and 1939—three to night fighters. Losses were replaced by aircraft flown in from Mallorca, via Sardinia. At this time the unit operated two Heinkel He 115s and evaluated them.

AS/88 operations in Spain were undermined by a lack of support services. The He 59 units had been transferred to the Luftwaffe by the Kriegsmarine yet the navy still stored the spares for the complex machine. The only engineering unit was based in Seville, permanently and was not transferred to meet operational needs. The aircraft had to be sent back to Germany. They were flown to Cádiz, dismantled and shipped; a process that lasted three months and often left the unit severely under resourced.

In his first combat mission he destroyed the Campsa fuel depots in Valencia which had been a priority target for some time. Harlinghausen became the first pilot to sink a ship using an air-dropped torpedo when he sank a cargo ship off Valencia harbour on 21 July 1938. The 4,798-ton freighter was named Thorpeness and British. It sank one nautical mile from Valencia. Francisco Franco informed the English that the ship had struck a mine. On 1 August 1938 Harlinghausen was promoted to Major.

In commanding in Spain, Harlinghausen became a pioneer of attacking ships accurately with bombs. German aircraft—mainly Heinkel He 59 and Heinkel He 60s—sank 144 ships out of the 554 lost by the Republican forces. Before the fall of Barcelona in 1939, for example, German aircraft sank 30 ships and damaged scores more in the harbour.

At the end of the war, which ended in a Nationalist victory for Franco, Hitler and Mussolini, AS/88 had been credited with 52 ships sunk. Nevertheless, the anti-shipping arm failed to achieve any strategic results in Spain. Harlinghausen continued to develop this neglected sphere in opposition to the Oberkommando der Luftwaffe. The high command remained aloof from naval air power matters because it did not foresee a war with the British Empire.

Harlinghausen left AS/88 to return the air war school at Gatow in December 1938. In April 1939 he became the operations officer for Luftflotte 2 (Air Fleet 2) known at the time as Luftflottenkommando 2 (Air Fleet Command 2).

== World War II ==
On 3 September 1939—two days after the invasion of Poland—Hans Geisler was removed the staff of Luftflotte 2 and given command of Fliegerkorps X, which was initially named Fliegerdivision 10 upon formation on 5 September. Harlinghausen was appointed as chief of staff, effective from 1 November 1939. The headquarters located to Blankenese, Hamburg. The OKL regarded the war at sea and the destruction of British sea communications as secondary to the defeat of the Royal Air Force (RAF) and the British aviation industry. In September 1939, Harlinghausen's Fliegerkorps carried out sporadic operations off Eastern England with some success.

After it was renamed and formed from a division to a corps on 3 October 1939 the command was given I./Kampfgeschwader 30 and I./Kampfgeschwader 26, equipped with the Junkers Ju 88 and Heinkel He 111. The air corps operated in the North Sea during the Phoney War period. In a memorandum, dated 15 January 1940, the navy wished to procure the Dornier Do 217 bomber, then under development, but Hermann Göring, commander-in-chief of the Luftwaffe, refused citing the intent to transfer all offensive operations over to Fliegerkorps X, along with all new types. The He 115 was allocated to the navy instead. Harlinghausen was influential in ending production of the He 115 in favour of the He 111 for naval operations.

For Harlinghausen, the war began in the autumn. On 17 October 1939, elements of the air corps attacked Scapa Flow, a major anchorage for the Royal Navy. Nazi propaganda wrongly claimed the aircraft carrier Ark Royal sunk. Operations in the north sea over the course of 17-19 December 1939 sank 10 vessels, all fishing trawlers, for a meagre 2,949 tons. On 17 December 1939, five trawlers were sunk, with at least two dead and five wounded. The following day there were three deaths aboard two sunken trawlers. Another was damaged and lost three crew killed. On 19 December, Star of Scotland suffered three dead in an attempt to sink her. From 9–30 January 1940, the air corps sank 12 freighters for 23, 994 gross register tons off eastern England. Specifically, KG 26 and 30 sank four ships and damaged four more in a single operation on 29 January. The following day, 35 Heinkel He 111s sank a further two and damaged a further eight.

Shipping operations were extended to Scotland in 1940. In March 1940 German aircraft attacked 57 merchant ships and 38 Trawlers. Seven of the former and one of the latter were seriously damaged. Despite being the chief of staff in Fliegerkorps X, Harlinghausen flew missions and sank two merchant ships of 6,827 gross register tons (GRT), and severely damaged the 8,441 grt passenger ship Domala. The attack, carried out off St Catherine's Point, killed 98 people. On 1 March 1940, a He 111 from the Korpsführungkette (Corps Command Section)/Fliegerkorps X with Harlinghausen aboard, sank the 1,388 grt Norwegian freighter, Vestfoss south-east of Copinsay Island. On 20 March he sank the transport Barn Hill (5,439 grt) on a southward armed reconnaissance mission into the English Channel. The ship sank off Brighton. The vessel settled on a sand bank in shallow water and her cargo was salvaged.

Operations incurred casualties. No. 12 Group RAF and No. 13 Group RAF moved into Scottish and Northumbrian airfields in greater strength. With this move, the number of interceptions by RAF Fighter Command increased. 10 KG 26 bombers were lost from 17 October 1939 to 15 August 1940 over Northumbria and Durham. KG 30 lost a further aircraft; all but one to fighter aircraft. A number of these interceptions were made during attacks on the Orkney islands from 8–10 April, made as a precursor to the invasions of Norway and Denmark.

=== Operation Weserübung ===
Anti-shipping operations were interrupted. On 5 March 1940, Harlinghausen and Geisler travelled to Berlin. They were informed of the intention to invade Denmark and Norway. The planning for these invasions ended the prospect of intensive operations in the North Sea. In April 1940 the air corps' order of battle showed considerable reinforcement. The Luftwaffe order of battle April 1940 included transport groups KGr zbv 101–108, equipped with the Junkers Ju 52. Kampfgeschwader 4, 26 and 30 provided its bombing power. Harlinghausen remained chief of staff. The long coastline allowed for the use of longer range aircraft. Only weak dive-bomber units were allocated. Fliegerkorps X was given 500 aircraft; just 40 were dive-bombers. The air corps issued an order to all naval and land forces with the finalised plans, suggesting the air staff had a strong influence on the invasion plans.

Operation Weserübung began on 9 April 1940. Denmark was in German hands within the day. Airborne forces assiste in the Capture of Egersund, Kristiansand and the Oslo Airport, Fornebu. All ports, from Stavanger in the south to Trondheim in the north were to be reinforced by air once captured. From the second week, Fliegerkorps X turned to defeating the Åndalsnes landings and supported the Battle of Dombås and Namsos campaign.

Southern and central Norway was secured within days. In the north, the Royal Navy prevented the capture of Narvik and the subsequent Battles of Narvik ended in a series of German naval defeats. Harlinghausen earned a reputation as one of the more aggressive commanders and excelled in his command of the ad hoc Fliegerführer Trondheim. The Royal Navy acknowledged the air corps' effectiveness. Admiral Charles Forbes kept his distance from the Norwegian coast after a series of damaging air attacks on his Home Fleet. Forbes was especially concerned about his smaller ships; his cruiser and destroyers after the loss of Gurkha. Harlinghausen's air corps flew in supplies to Eduard Dietl in the days following the invasion, as his forces fought the Battles of Narvik. The snow and weather conditions made landing and take off difficult. Aircraft were vulnerable in the narrow fjords. The supply operations had limited effect; they improved morale but did not improve the battle-readiness of Dietl's forces.

On 30 April 1940 Harlinghausen flew a patrol between Trondheim and Namsos in one of two staffel KüFlGr (Coastal Flying Group) 506's He 115s. Over Namsfjord he discovered many targets. His reconnaissance mission guided 3./StG 1 to the area and the Junkers Ju 87 Stukas sank the anti-submarine warfare trawlers Siretoko, Jardine and Warwickshire. HMS Bittern was also badly damaged necessitating her scuttling by HMS Juno. Harlinghausen was awarded the Knight's Cross of the Iron Cross (Ritterkreuz des Eisernen Kreuzes) on 5 May 1940 for his service piloting Heinkel He 115s and commanding an ad hoc group named Fliegerführer Stavanger. Harlinghausen's command made a significant operational contribution to the German victory in the Norwegian Campaign by rendering Allied sea communications insecure. On 18 May 1940 Harlinghausen probably sank the 55-year old 988 brt Sirius—claimed as a 1,500 grt freighter.

The campaign ended on 9 June with the Allied evacuation from Norway. The Luftwaffe tipped the balance, compensating for the weakness of Wehrmacht sea power. Interdicting shipping lanes, air superiority and transport operations were crucial to the eventual German victory. The invasion cost Fliegerkorps X 1,130 air crew; 341 killed in action and 448 missing in action.

=== Battle of Britain to Mediterranean ===
Fliegerkorps X remained in Norway. It formed the only combat formation of Luftflotte 5 (Air Fleet 5). KG 26 and 30, the anti-shipping specialists were the only bomber units under its command. KG 4 was reassigned to Fliegerivision 9, the minelaying unit, which was formed into a flying corps of the same number in October 1940. While Fall Gelb was put into effect—the Battle of the Netherlands, Battle of Belgium and Battle of France—Fliegerkorps X continued in attacks on British coastal shipping. By the conclusion of the campaigns in June 1940, JG 77 provided the only single-engineḍ fighter group. ZG 76 was the long-range fighter group present for fighter escort over the North Sea. The air corps sat out the Battle of Britain until mid-August 1940, while Luftlfotte 2 and 3 carried out the main effort in southern Englanḍ.

On 15 August 1940, Luftflotte 5 carried out its only large scale bombing attack of the battle on land-based targets. The OKL hoped to divide Fighter Command's fighter squadrons and destroy them by attacking the British Isles from all directions. The operation was a failure and the air corps suffered heavy losses among bombers and long range fighter escorts. The air fleet (effectively Fliegerkorps X) lost 10 percent of its strength on one sortie. ZG 76 suffered one-third losses; some 19 aircraft over the North Sea and English Channel. The German air fleets lost 77 aircraft that day. Operations against the mainland were out of the question thereafter. The air fleet did not venture over Britain again for the duration of the battle. The Norwegian and Danish-based German aircraft resumed the war against the Royal Navy and merchant traffic.

Harlinghausen refined and developed ship-attack tactics that the Luftwaffe used over Great Britain in 1940. The bomber approached on the beam at low-level and released bombs to damage the ship's hull below the water line. The types of vessels targeted extended to Lightships and fishing boats which the Germans saw as legitimate targets. The number of ships attacked and damaged in 1940 rose to 127 in 1940 and to a peak of 164 in 1941. On 3 November 1940 Harlinghausen was credited with sinking a 6,000 grt ship, probably the 3,871 grt Kildale off Kinnaird Head bringing his claim total to approximately 100,000 grt.

The air corps was sent to Sicily, Italy in late 1940. It formed the first wave of attacks on the intensively bombed British base at Malta and to support the Axis powers in the Battle of the Mediterranean. The air corps moved to Axis-held Greece in June 1941, by which time Harlinghausen had left the corps. During its operations in the first half of 1941, the air corps effectively suppressed the Royal Navy Submarine Service, and its 10th Submarine Flotilla. Even with two antishipping experts occupying the position of commander, and chief of staff, the air corps failed to neutralise or paralyse the island's defences. The staff blamed limited supplies and the distractions on other fronts for the failure to achieve more; and above all, closing the Strait of Sicily to British naval forces.

Harlinghausen tried to secure assistance from the Regia Marina to help shut the straits. His idea was for naval forces to patrol in darkness for his air corps could not see the enemy. The Italians could shadow the enemy until daybreak when his air power could be used against them. His efforts were in vain. The major success in this region was achieved on 11 January with the sinking of the cruiser Southampton and damaging of Gloucester. He was awarded the Knight's Cross of the Iron Cross with Oak Leaves (Ritterkreuz des Eisernen Kreuzes mit Eichenlaub) 30 January 1941.

Harlinghausen was part of the disastrous raid on British convoys moving through the Suez Canal. After four hours they reached the southernmost region, but found nothing. Harlinghausen ordered the other seven to seek alternative targets. After attacking a Ferry, Harlinghausen spotted the scattered convoy in the Great Bitter Lake. The head winds were double than expected, and all the He 111s ran out of fuel. Harlinghausen and Kowalewski crash landed in the desert 280 km south east of Benghazi. They were rescued after five days; three crew were captured.

=== Fliegerführer Atlantik ===
On 28 February 1941 Harlinghausen was appointed Fliegerführer Atlantik (Flying Leader Atlantic). As a ship-attack expert, he was a logical choice to lead Atlantic air operations. His headquarters were stationed in the village of Brandérion. Harlinghausen was responsible for organising fleet and U-boat support, meteorological missions and even coastal protection, although Küstenfliegergruppe (KuFlGr) (coastal aircraft group), Minensuchgruppe (MSGr—minesearch group) existed for that purpose. He had barely 100 aircraft operational. His commitment to the Mediterranean Theatre of Operations while managing the staff of X Fliegerkorps, delayed his command until 31 March 1941. He agreed with the operational methods of Karl Donitz at BdU, who favoured using the four-engine Focke-Wulf Fw 200 "Condors" to shadow convoys and direct U-Boats to their quarry; then to begin a coordinated air-sea attack to defeat the convoy.

Harlinghausen was given meagre forces to achieve these ends owing to Hermann Göring's intransigence. Among his duties was to coordinate attacks on convoys with the Kriegsmarine's U-Boats. Harlinghausen's command was effective, and often transmitted accurate locations of convoys but because of a paucity in submarines, they failed to respond. Harlinghausen remonstrated with Dönitz who decided a more flexible approach was needed, rather than close cooperation. Harlinghausen frequently clashed with the Admiral over operational deployments, and opposed the shifting of air operations to interdict Gibraltar sea lanes as opposed to the Western Approaches.

Harlinghausen's appointment coincided with the "First Happy Time", which was already rapidly approaching its end when Harlinghausen took charge. By Christmas 1940, KG 40, for example, had sunk 19 ships of approximately 100,000 tons and damaged 37– 180,000–tons worth of shipping. In January 1941, 17 ships were sunk amounting to 65,000 tons and five damaged. February was worse for the British, losing 21 ships to Fw 200s, totalling 84,301 tons. During the first quarter of 1941, the Condors sank 171,000 GRT, the vast majority being lone ships. In one case, a sustained attack upon convoy OB 290 on 26 February 1941 accounted for seven to nine vessels (49,865 GRT), all sunk by KG 40 Fw 200s. However, with never more than eight aircraft operational, this was an exception. Soon, British CAM ship (catapult aircraft merchantmen) appeared, and the time of light Condor losses ended.

Three months into his leadership, Harlinghausen was held responsible for the Luftwaffe's failure to prevent the loss of the battleship Bismarck, which sank on 27 May 1941. His command was reinforced by II./KG 1, II./KG 54 and I./KG 77, to help the Bismarck, but the air effort failed to reach the combat area before the ship sank. No German Capital ship sailed into the Atlantic again, leaving only the U-boat war in operation.

The last half of 1941 had been a severe blow to Fliegerführer Atlantik. It had sunk just four ships (10,298 tons) and damaged two for the loss of 16 Condors, including seven to convoy defences. From 15 March to 31 October 1941 Fliegerführer Atlantik reported 57 convoys. Through cooperation with U-boats 74 ships, totalling 390,000 tons, one aircraft carrier, and one destroyer were sunk. The command sank 161 vessels for 903,000 grt, probably sank seven for 31,000 grt, damaged 113 for 590,000 grt. Within six months, this trend underwent a radical change. The transfer of Condors to other theatres, according to OKL wartime report, in mid-December 1941 brought air-submarine cooperation to "a standstill".

Harlinghausen's insistence on flying combat operations left his command leaderless after he was shot down and wounded without his usual pilot Robert Kowaleski on 13 October while attacking a transport ship in the Irish Sea. The crew managed to slip back to the French coast near Vannes, where they were rescued by fishermen. He spent the next three months in hospital. In January 1942 he was replaced by Ulrich Kessler as Fliegerführer Atlantik.

=== North Africa, return to Mediterranean ===
In January 1942 Harlinghausen was appointed Geschwaderkommodore of Kampfgeschwader 26, an anti-shipping bomber wing. KG 26 operated three Gruppen, groups, simultaneously but often they operated in different theatres. Harlinghausen and the staff command remained based in the Mediterranean. Harlinghausen had long been a supporter of torpedo bomber development. Along with the operational command, he was appointed Bevollmächtigten for das Lufttorpedowesen—Plenipotentiary for airborne torpedoes.

KG 26 relocated to Italy in early 1942, and began torpedo training at Grosseto. Harlinghausen soon lost one Staffeln (6) to the Black Sea campaigns. I and III./KG 26 were ready for operations and deployed to Norway while II./KG 26 transferred to the Eastern Front in April, only to return in early August. Harlinghausen remained wing commander through the intensive attacks on Malta convoys in February 1942. Among their successes was the Rowallan Castle, which sank after her escorts scuttled her. III./KG 26 moved to France near Rennes from Norway. Southwest of the Scilly Isles on 3 and 4 August it carried out its first torpedo attack against a small convoy and claimed six ships totalling 20,000 grt. 6./KG 26, recalled from the Soviet Union, claimed two freighters from the infamous Pedestal convoy in mid–August.

From May 1942, KG 26 engaged targets from Norway and sank a significant number of ships. Convoy PQ 10 and Convoy PQ 14 by KG 26 and 30 resulted in the sinking of two by air and two by submarine attack. It attacked Convoy PQ 16 and achieved success. In September 1942, I./KG 26 were involved in the destruction of Convoy PQ 17 and attacks on Convoy PQ 18, during the Arctic convoys. In the later operation, the III./KG 26 lost 52 crew missing, seven wounded and five killed. Against PQ17, aircraft sank 10 of the 24 ships; though U-boats claimed ships that had already been crippled by air attack. This amounted to 56,000 of the 142,000 grt sunk. KG 26 were supported by torpedo-equipped He 115s. Against PQ18 ten of the 13 ships were sunk by air attack. KG 26 and 30 had a hand in sinking a further three; all in 300 sorties. But the cost was high; 44 aircraft. The operations, despite the losses, were a vindication of Harlinghausen and the use of torpedo bombers.

In November 1942 the Axis front in North Africa began to collapse. The Second Battle of El Alamein destroyed their foothold in Egypt and led to their pursuit across Libya by the British; Operation Torch had seized Algeria, Morocco and threatened to take Tunisia. The OKW reacted swiftly and dispatched air and land forces to Tunisia to maintain a bridge head. The Run for Tunis was narrowly won by the Axis beginning the Tunisian Campaign. Harlinghausen was appointed Fliegerführer Tunesien.

Harlinghausen was responsible to the Commander in Chief South, Albert Kesselring, in the initial stages, who was given complete command of the Tunisian bridgehead. The limited forces available forced the Axis to establish their lines on defencible terrain with the shortest logistics line, one as far inland from the main supply ports as Axis forces could maintain. Harlinghausen led three companies of 1st Tunis Field Battalion, one company of paratroopers, one antiaircraft artillery company, 14th Company, 104th Panzer Grenadier Regiment, advance detachment of the 5th Parachute Regiment of the Hermann Göring Panzer Division (3 officers and 150 enlisted men). Harlinghausen's forces seized the key positions in Tunis with his troops after the bulk of the Vichy French forces had withdrawn from the city on the night of 13–14 November. Harlinghausen had 140 aircraft, including 109 fighters.

Harlinghausen was given command of Fliegerkorps II from February to May 1943. The air corps fought a defensive battle over Tunisia into 1943. Axis air forces in Tunisia were under constant threat of fuel and ammunition starvation. Supplies that reached Tunis were immediately used up. From March to April Allied naval and air forces sank 108 ship—41 percent of all Axis supply shipping. In contrast, Harlinghausen ordered his anti shipping units to abandon forward bases in Sardinia for the mainland, due to Allied air raids. The daily sorties against Allied warships fell from 11 to two.

In April 1943 Operation Flax permanently disrupted the air bridge from Sicily to Tunisia. At the end of April there was no fuel left to run radar sets, or move tanks from workshops. The vain effort to supply Tunisia was disastrous. In April and first week of May, 1943, 177 Junkers Ju 52s were lost; six months after the beginning of the failed air lift during the Battle of Stalingrad. Harlinghausen escaped the 13 May capitulation in which 130,000 soldiers, starved of food, fuel and ammunition, surrendered. Harlinghausen survived a month longer until dismissed from command on 10 June 1943 following a series of disputes with Kesselring. Harlinghausen's desire to rest and rebuild his Kampfgruppen was overruled by Göring. The Reichsmarschall demanded air attacks on Allied ports at night in strength. Harlinghausen's complaints to Kesslering were counter productive and the main reason for his dismissal.

=== Later commands ===
After his dismissal, Harlinghausen briefly returned to Fliegerführer Atlantik as a member of Kessler's staff but was placed in reserve on 26 June 1943. In October 1943 he was appointed General der Kampfflieger. On 11 November, Reichsmarschall (Marshal of the Realm) Hermann Göring, in his role as commander-in-chief of the Luftwaffe, organized a meeting of high-ranking Luftwaffe officers, including Nordmann. The meeting, also referred to as the "Areopag" was held at the Luftkriegsakademie (air war academy) at Berlin-Gatow. This Luftwaffe version of the Greek Areopagus—a court of justice—aimed at finding solutions to the deteriorating air was situation over Germany.

On 27 April 1945, Harlinghausen was appointed commander of Luftwaffenkommando West, a position he held until the end of hostilities. He was captured by American troops and held as a prisoner of war until his release in September 1947.

== Postwar career ==
Harlinghausen served in the new West German Air Force from 1957 to 1961. He was sent into retirement, having been politically uncomfortable during his post-war career, after demanding a proper investigation in the 1961 F-84 Thunderstreak incident, after which Oberstleutnant Siegfried Barth, commander of Jagdbombergeschwader (JaBoG) 32, was removed from his post without a proper investigation.

Harlinghausen died in Gütersloh in March 1986.

== Awards ==
- Spanish Cross in Gold with Swords and Diamonds
- Iron Cross (1939)
  - 2nd Class (30 January 1940)
  - 1st Class (3 February 1940)
- Knight's Cross of the Iron Cross with Oak Leaves
  - Knight's Cross on 4 May 1940 as Major in the general staff and chief of staff of the X. Fliegerkorps
  - 8th Oak Leaves on 30 January 1941 as Oberstleutnant in the general staff and chief of staff of the X. Fliegerkorps
- Great Cross of Merit

Military offices
Preceded by none	Commander of Fliegerführer Atlantik; 31 March 1941 – 5 January 1942	Succeeded by Generalmajor Ulrich Kessler
Preceded by Generaloberst Bruno Loerzer	Commander of II. Fliegerkorps; 23 February 1943 – 12 June 1943	Succeeded by General Alfred Bülowius
