= Otto Hoffmann von Waldau =

German general

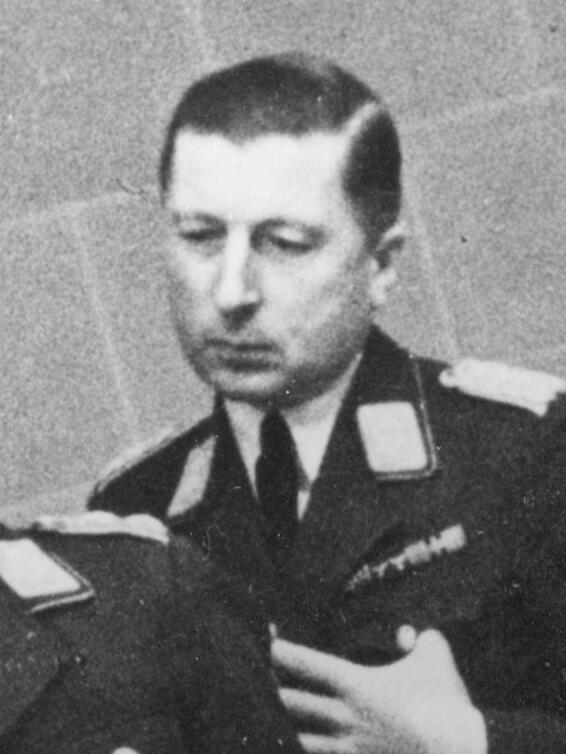
- Born: 7 July 1898; Bankau, German Empire
- Died: 17 May 1943 (aged 44) near Petrich, Bulgaria
- Military career
- Allegiance: German Empire (to 1918); Weimar Republic (to 1933); Nazi Germany
- Branch: Luftwaffe
- Service years: 1915–43
- Rank: General der Flieger
- Commands: X Fliegerkorps
- Conflicts: World War II
- Awards: Knight's Cross of the Iron Cross

Otto Hoffmann von Waldau (7 July 1898 – 17 May 1943) was a German general during World War II who commanded the 10th Air Corps. He was killed in an air crash on 17 May 1943.

== Awards ==
- Iron Cross (1914) 2nd and 1st Class
- Clasp to Iron Cross (1939) 2nd and 1st Class
- Knight's Cross of the Iron Cross on 28 June 1942 as Generalleutnant and Fliegerführer Afrika

Military offices
Preceded by Generalmajor Theo Osterkamp (acting)	Commander of Fliegerführer Afrika; 12 April 1942 – 30 August 1942	Succeeded by General der Flieger Hans Seidemann
Preceded by General der Flieger Hans Geisler	Commander of X. Fliegerkorps; 31 August 1942 – 31 December 1942	Succeeded by Generalleutnant Alexander Holle
