= Ulrich Kessler =

German General and Knight's Cross recipient

Ulrich Otto Eduard Kessler
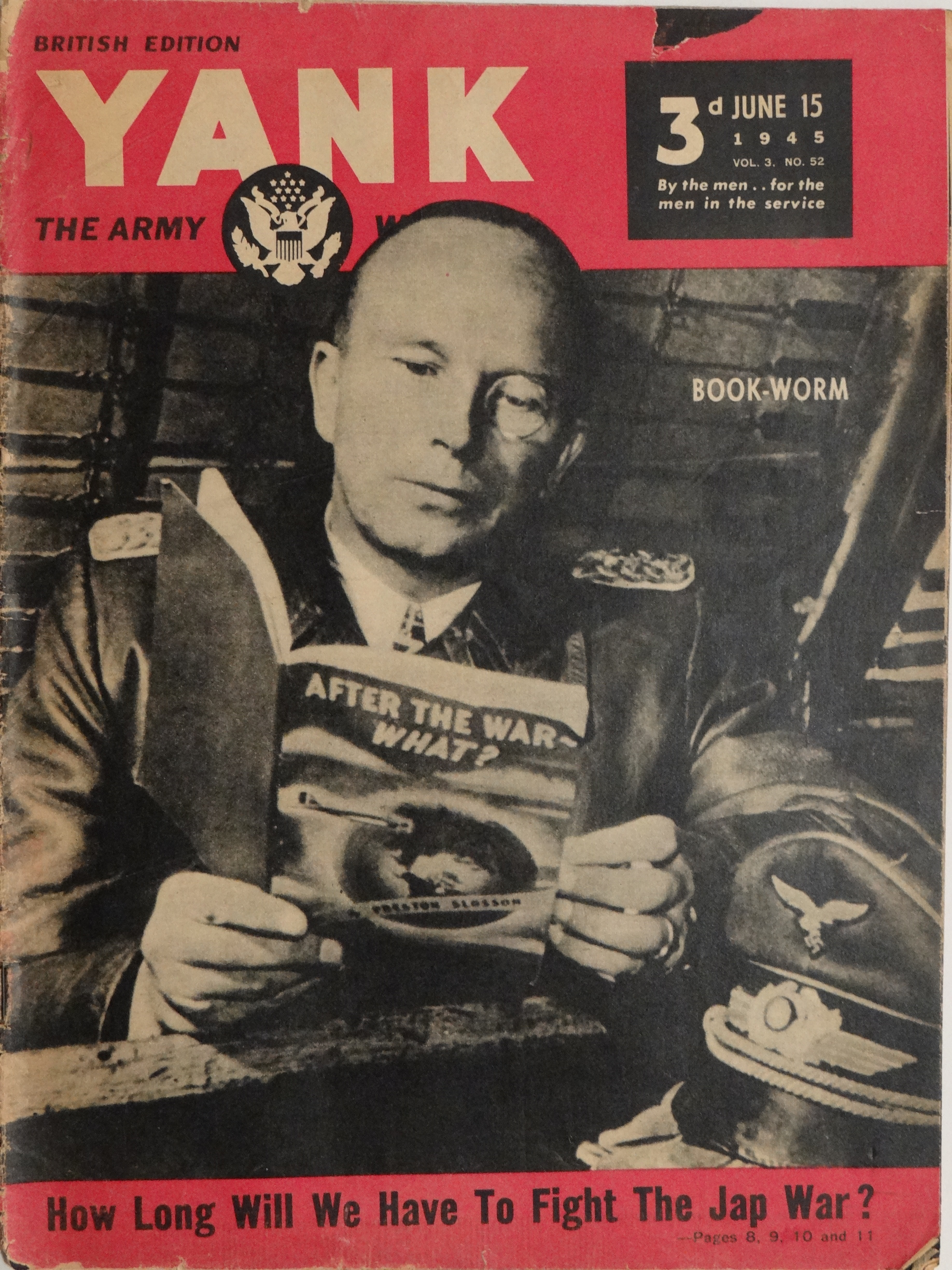
- Yank, the Army Weekly, Cover showing German Lt. Gen. Ulrich Kessler following capture in 1945.
- Born: 3 November 1894; Danzig-Langfuhr, Kingdom of Prussia, German Empire
- Died: 27 March 1983 (aged 88); Bad Urach, West Germany
- Military career
- Allegiance: German Empire; Weimar Republic (to 1933); Nazi Germany
- Branch: Imperial German Navy; Reichsmarine; Luftwaffe
- Service years: 1914–45
- Rank: General der Flieger
- Commands: Kampfgeschwader 1 Fliegerführer Atlantik
- Conflicts: World War I World War II: Invasion of Poland; Battle of France; Battle of the Atlantic
- Awards: Knight's Cross of the Iron Cross

Ulrich Otto Eduard Kessler (3 November 1894 – 27 March 1983) was a German general (General der Flieger) in the Luftwaffe during World War II. He was a recipient of the Knight's Cross of the Iron Cross, awarded by Nazi Germany to recognise battlefield bravery or successful military leadership.

== Biography ==
Born in Danzig in 1894, he joined the Imperial German Navy in 1914 when World War I broke out and worked as a radio operator, serving both at sea and at a land-based radio station in Neumünster. He was aboard SMS Friedrich Carl when it sank in the Baltic Sea and was also wounded in January 1916 aboard SMS Lübeck. Kessler started seaplane training in the summer of 1916 and finished at the end of the year. He became naval aviator for the rest of the war after completing pilot training and later served as a seaplane squadron commander. After the war, he was a member of the Freikorps and later joined the Reichsmarine in 1923. Kessler returned to ship duty and served as a torpedo boat commander before completing a world cruise aboard the cruiser SMS Hamburg between 1925 and 1927. Kessler became the head of the Navy Air Service upon his return to Germany and attended the German Naval Academy at Mürwik. He served as German Naval Attaché to the disarmament conference in Geneva, where he claimed to have befriended US Secretary of State Henry L. Stimson.

In 1933 Kessler was reassigned to the German Air Ministry, and he resigned his commission as a Kapitanleutnant (Lieutenant) in the navy to become a Oberstleutnant (Lieutenant Colonel) in the new Luftwaffe (German Air Force). He held several staff positions in the 1930s before being considered by Hermann Göring, the commander of the Air Force, to become the air attaché in the United Kingdom. Because Kessler did not believe that Germany could easily win a war against the British, he got into a dispute with Göring, who removed him from consideration for the assignment in England. Instead, he became the commander of Kampfgeschwader 1 during the invasion of Poland, and later was the chief of staff for Luftflotte 1 and X Fliegerkorps. In 1944 Kessler was recalled to Berlin for training to be an air attaché. Kessler had been connected to the Stauffenberg assassination plot against Hitler, and feared that he could be investigated by the Gestapo. He was well acquainted with the Japanese naval attaché to Germany, Rear Admiral Hideo Kojima, who decided to help Kessler by requesting that Göring appoint him to replace the Luftwaffe attaché in Japan.

In September 1944, the head of the Luftwaffe, Hermann Göring, assigned Kessler to be the Luftwaffe attaché at the German embassy in Japan. Kessler requested a larger liaison staff to be sent with him to create an expanded office of the Air Attaché in Japan, but this was not granted and he received only part of the staff he asked for.

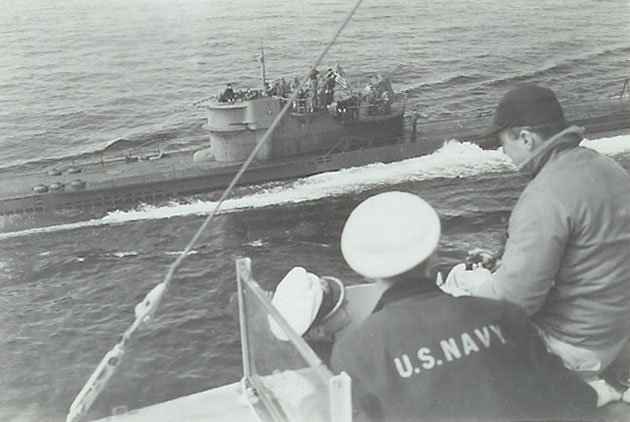
U-234 surrendering.

Ulrich Kessler was captured on 15 May 1945 on board U-234, by a boarding party from the destroyer USS Sutton, when the German submarine surrendered on 14 May 1945 following Germany's unconditional surrender. He was returning to active duty as Chief of the Luftwaffe-Liaison-Staff Tokyo and Air-Attache at the German Embassy in Tokyo. On the voyage, according to Fehler, relations between Kessler and a convinced Nazi passenger, naval judge Kay Nieschling, became very strained.

== Awards and decorations ==
- German Cross in Gold (3 April 1944)
- Knight's Cross of the Iron Cross on 8 April 1944 as Generalleutnant and Fliegerführer Atlantik

== Bibliography ==
- Fellgiebel, Walther-Peer (2000) [1986]. Die Träger des Ritterkreuzes des Eisernen Kreuzes 1939–1945 — Die Inhaber der höchsten Auszeichnung des Zweiten Weltkrieges aller Wehrmachtteile [The Bearers of the Knight's Cross of the Iron Cross 1939–1945 — The Owners of the Highest Award of the Second World War of all Wehrmacht Branches] (in German). Friedberg, Germany: Podzun-Pallas. ISBN 978-3-7909-0284-6.
- Patzwall, Klaus D.; Scherzer, Veit (2001). Das Deutsche Kreuz 1941 – 1945 Geschichte und Inhaber Band II [The German Cross 1941 – 1945 History and Recipients Volume 2] (in German). Norderstedt, Germany: Verlag Klaus D. Patzwall. ISBN 978-3-931533-45-8.
- Scherzer, Veit (2007). Die Ritterkreuzträger 1939–1945 Die Inhaber des Ritterkreuzes des Eisernen Kreuzes 1939 von Heer, Luftwaffe, Kriegsmarine, Waffen-SS, Volkssturm sowie mit Deutschland verbündeter Streitkräfte nach den Unterlagen des Bundesarchives [The Knight's Cross Bearers 1939–1945 The Holders of the Knight's Cross of the Iron Cross 1939 by Army, Air Force, Navy, Waffen-SS, Volkssturm and Allied Forces with Germany According to the Documents of the Federal Archives] (in German). Jena, Germany: Scherzers Militaer-Verlag. ISBN 978-3-938845-17-2.

Military offices
| Preceded by None | Commander of Kampfgeschwader 1; 1 May 1939 – 17 December 1939 | Succeeded by Oberst Ernst Exss |
| Preceded by Generalmajor Wilhelm Speidel | Chief of Staff of Luftflotte 1; 19 December 1939 – 25 April 1940 | Succeeded by Oberst Heinz-Hellmuth von Wühlisch |
| Preceded by Oberstleutnant Martin Harlinghausen | Chief of Staff of X. Fliegerkorps; 25 April 1940 – 21 May 1940 | Succeeded by Generalleutnant Günther Korten |
| Preceded by Generalmajor Wolfgang von Wild | Commander of Fliegerführer Atlantik; 5 January 1942 – 1 April 1944 | Succeeded by None |
| Preceded by Generalmajor Wolfgang von Gronau | German Air Attaché to Japan; Chief of Luftwaffe Liaison Staff Tokyo; January – May 1945 | Succeeded by None |
