= 10th Air Corps =

Unit of the German Luftwaffe in World War II

X. Fliegerkorps German 10th Air Corps
- Flag of a commanding general of a Fliegerkorps
- Active: 2 October 1939 – 5 September 1944
- Country: Nazi Germany
- Branch: Luftwaffe
- Engagements: World War II: Operation Wikinger; Operation Excess; Operation Marita; Dodecanese Campaign

Commanders
- Notable commanders: Martin Fiebig

X. Fliegerkorps (10th Air Corps) was a formation of the German Luftwaffe in World War II, which specialised in coastal operations. (Note: For more details see Luftwaffe Organization) It was formed 2 October 1939, in Hamburg from the 10. Flieger-Division.

== Operational history ==
Generalleutnant Hans Ferdinand Geisler was put in command of the newly formed Flieger-Division on 3 September 1939, based at Blankenese. Initially its force was the Heinkel He 111 bombers of Kampfgeschwader 26. Geisler's Division was allocated the new Junkers Ju 88 bombers which were still being brought into service with Kampfgeschwader 25, on 7 September this was redesignated Kampfgeschwader 30.

The Corps was stationed in north Germany in February 1940 when some of its aircraft were involved in a disastrous friendly fire incident that terminated the Kriegsmarine's Operation Wikinger.

In early 1941, X. Fliegerkorps was transferred from Norway to Sicily to support the build-up of the Afrika Korps in Libya. On 12 January 1941, it had 80 Ju 88A-4 bombers of LG 1 and 12 Ju 88D-5 reconnaissance planes at Catania, 80 Ju 87R-1 ("Stuka") dive-bombers of StG 1 and StG 2 at Trapani, 27 He 111H-6 torpedo bombers of KG 26 at Comiso and 34 Bf 110C-4 fighters of ZG 26 at Palermo. (Note: Wood, Tony & Gunston, Bill Hitler's Luftwaffe Crescent Books p.33) It was prominent in the axis effort to suppress Royal Navy interference with the supply routes from Italy by reducing Malta's effectiveness as a forward base.

On 10 and 11 January 1941 X. Fliegerkorps planes sank HMS Southampton and heavily damaged HMS Illustrious during Operation Excess. (Note: Greene, Jack & Massignani, Alessandro The Naval War in the Mediterranean 1940-1943 Chatham Publishing (1998) ISBN 1-86176-057-4 pp.133-136) Bf 109E-7 fighters of JG 26 and JG 27 joined the offensive on Malta during February and March 1941. (Note: Wood, Tony & Gunston, Bill Hitler's Luftwaffe Crescent Books p.33)

In the spring of 1940, the Luftwaffe assigned all flying units intended for the conquest of Norway (Operation Weserübung) to the corps. The X. Fliegerkorps was active there from April 1940 onwards to conquer the country and combat Allied naval operations.

The Corps was moved out of Sicily in April 1941 for the Invasion of Yugoslavia and Greece. (Note: Wood, Tony & Gunston, Bill Hitler's Luftwaffe Crescent Books p.33) Maritime float planes replaced fighters and dive bombers while the Corps was stationed in Greece. Strength on 10 May 1942 was 74 Ju 88 at Eleusis and Heraklion, 25 He 111 at Kalamaki, and 53 Ar 196A-3, He 60c, Fokker T.VIII and Bv 138C-1 at Skaramagas and Kavalla. (Note: Wood, Tony & Gunston, Bill Hitler's Luftwaffe Crescent Books p.50) The Corps was crucial in securing air superiority and German victory during the 1943 Dodecanese Campaign. The Corps was renamed to Kommandierender General der Deutschen Luftwaffe in Griechenland (commanding general of the German Luftwaffe in Greece) in March 1944 and disbanded on 5 September 1944 with the withdrawal of German forces from the country.

== Commanding officers ==
=== Commanding general ===
- General der Flieger Hans Geisler, 2 October 1939 – 31 August 1942
- General der Flieger Bernhard Kühl (acting), 3 June 1940 – 20 September 1940
- General der Flieger Otto Hoffmann von Waldau, 31 August 1942 – 31 December 1942
- Generalleutnant Alexander Holle, 1 January 1943 – 22 May 1943
- General der Flieger Martin Fiebig, 22 May 1943 – 1 September 1944

=== Chief-of-Staff ===
- Oberstleutnant Martin Harlinghausen, 1 November 1939 – 31.3.41
- Generalleutnant Ulrich Kessler (acting), 25 April 1940 – 21 May 1940
- Generalleutnant Günther Korten, 1 April 1941 – March 1942
- Oberst Sigismund Freiherr von Falkenhausen, 1 April 1942 - March 1943
- Major Eckard Christian, 8 March 1943 – 2 June 1943
- Generalmajor Walter Boenicke, June 1943 – 6 January 1944
