= Kampfgeschwader 26 =

Military unit of Nazi Germany

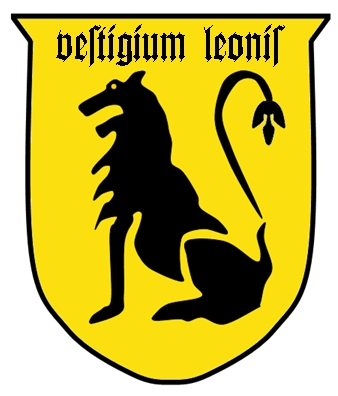
- Active: 1939–45
- Country: Nazi Germany
- Branch: Luftwaffe
- Type: Bomber unit
- Role: aerial bombing close air support anti-shipping aerial interdiction
- Size: Air Force Wing
- Nickname: Löwen
- Engagements: Polish Campaign; German invasion of Denmark (1940); Norwegian Campaign; Battle of France; Battle of Britain; Balkans Campaign; German invasion of Yugoslavia; Battle of Greece; Battle of Crete; Battle of the Mediterranean; Siege of Malta; Battle of the Atlantic; Arctic Convoys of World War II; Eastern Front; Operation Torch; Allied invasion of Sicily; Italian Campaign; Battle of Normandy

Insignia
- Identification symbol: Geschwaderkennung of 1H

Kampfgeschwader 26 (KG 26) "Löwengeschwader" (in English Bomber Wing 26 aka "Lions' Wing" by virtue of its insignia) was a German air force Luftwaffe bomber wing unit during World War II. Its units participated on all of the fronts in the European Theatre until the end of the war. It operated three of the major German aircraft medium bomber types; the Heinkel He 111, Junkers Ju 88 and the Junkers Ju 188. The unit engaged in aerial bombing, close air support, anti-shipping and aerial interdiction operations. The majority of its operational life – not entirely unlike another Luftwaffe wing designated KG 40 — was spent on anti-shipping missions.

== History ==
Kampfgeschwader 26 was formed on 1 May 1939 at Lüneburg with Stab./KG 26 and I. Gruppe (Group). II. Gruppe was formed near Lübeck Blankensee. III Gruppe was not formed until 1 November 1939 near Jesau (Kaliningrad Oblast). It was disbanded as redesignated K.Gr. 126. The Gruppe second formation took place on 20 February 1940 at Lübeck.

== War time service ==
=== Poland ===
During the Polish Campaign Stab./KG 26 operated from Gabbert under 1. Fliegerdivision (1st. Air Division), Luftflotte 1 (Air Fleet 1). On 7 September the unit was placed under the command of 2. Fliegerdivision, Luftflotte 4. Stab./KG 26 was ordered to Lübeck-Blankensee in North West Germany on 12 September to begin operations in the North Sea. II. Gruppe had 35 Heinkel He 111s with 31 serviceable on 1 September 1939. Based at Gabbert-Pomerania under 1. Fliegerdivision, Luftflotte 1. It attacked targets around Poznań throughout the campaign, attacking railway targets and Polish Army troop concentrations in the path of the German Fourth Army's advance between 2–4 September. Operations shifted to airfields on 4–5 September in the Łódź and Warsaw area. On 7 September the units assaulted rail targets in the Lvov area in support of the German Fourteenth Army. I./KG 26 was withdrawn from operations over Poland on 12 September.

=== North Sea operations ===
Stab./KG 26 began operations from the Lübeck base under the command of 10. Fliegerdivision on 12 September. I./KG 26 had played no part in the Polish Campaign. It had been ordered to Lübeck with 36 He 111s, 32 serviceable, under the command of 4. Fliegerdivision Luftflotte 2 for anti-shipping operations. On 1 September the unit conducted a reconnaissance over the Thames Estuary. 1.Staffel attacked the Royal Navy aircraft carrier HMS Ark Royal on 26 September. 3. Staffel conducted anti-shipping missions against Britain's east coast with some success.

On 28 October 1939, a Heinkel He 111H bomber from KG 26, bearing the Geschwaderkennung of 1H+JA (the "A" denoting the Geschwaderstab or command flight), officially became the first German aircraft to be shot down on British soil by the Royal Air Force. As it returned from a reconnaissance over the Firth of Clyde, Supermarine Spitfire fighters of 602 and 603 Squadron intercepted the bomber over Inchkeith. It crash landed near the small hamlet of Humbie, near the town of Dalkeith in East Lothian, Scotland, and is often referred to as the 'Humbie Heinkel'. Archie McKellar was credited with the victory.

On 22 February 1940, a Heinkel He 111 bomber from KG 26 bombed and sank the Z1 Leberecht Maass, who lost 280 of her crew and was survived by 60. (Note: Koop and Schmolke give a figure of 282 men lost.) During operations to save the crew, the Z3 Max Schultz also sank when it hit a mine, losing all hands. A post-war investigation determined that she had drifted into a newly laid British minefield. Hitler ordered a court of inquiry to be convened to investigate the cause of the losses and it concluded that both ships that been sunk by bombs from the He 111. The Kriegsmarine had failed to notify its destroyers that the Luftwaffe was making anti-shipping patrols at that time and had also failed to inform the Luftwaffe that its destroyers would be at sea.

3. Staffel sank five small vessels near the Firth of Forth on 7 December 1939. On 16 March 1940 3.Staffel attacked Scapa Flow and hit HMS Norfolk and one other ship, though the latter was not significantly damaged.

=== Denmark and Norway ===
The unit did participate in Operation Weserübung . Stab./KG 26 was placed under X Fliegerkorps. During the rapid 6 hour German invasion of Denmark (1940) the unit moved to Aalborg Airport, Denmark on 12 April 1940. It relocated during the Norwegian Campaign to Stavanger, then Trondheim as the Wehrmacht progressed northward. I./KG 26 was based at Marx, near Wilhelmshaven and made cross-water attacks against Norwegian Navy coastal batteries at Kristiansand and near Oslofjord. On 10 April the unit made an attack on Scapa Flow to disrupt potential British Naval reinforcements to Scandinavia. Afterwards I. Gruppe concentrated on direct ground assault on Allied Armies in Narvik–Harstad. On 17 April, near Stavanger, HMS Suffolk was attacked. On 15 May I./KG 26 sank an unidentified transport vessel in Harstad Harbour. On 7 June 1940 made its last attack on Narvik harbour, which was aborted. II./KG 26 carried out anti-shipping operations between Britain and Norway, January – August 1940. During the campaign in Norway the Gruppe made several attacks on Allied Destroyers, Cruisers and transports without success. On 18 April 1940 HMS Warspite was damaged slightly by II./KG 26. The unit undertook tactical strikes against Norwegian Army positions in the south of the country until 1 May 1940. After a ten-day rest, began strikes against British Naval forces. On 9 June it sank two transports and attacked HMS Ark Royal, west of Bodø. The Gruppe lost only four or five aircraft in Norwegian operations. Owing to operations over Norway, the unit did not participate in the early Battle of Britain operations (June – August 1940). III. Gruppe began operations over Norway on 9 April and remained until the end of the campaign. It operated 33 He 111s, 26 serviceable machines in ground and maritime operations. Incomplete loss records show that KG 26 lost at least 40 aircraft (70% or greater damage) from April 9 to June 9, 1940.

=== Battle of Britain ===
Stab./KG 26 began operations with six He 111s, all operational. I./KG had 30 and 29. II./KG 26 began operations on 1 September 1940 with 27 He 111s and only seven operational. III./KG 26 had 26 He 111s, all operational early in the Battle. It participated in all operations until the Spring, 1941. It suffered heavy losses on 15 August 1940, when the Gruppe was intercepted out to sea when attempting to raid Dishforth losing seven aircraft. In December 1940 it made use of the SC 2500 bomb on raids against London.

=== Anti-shipping operations ===
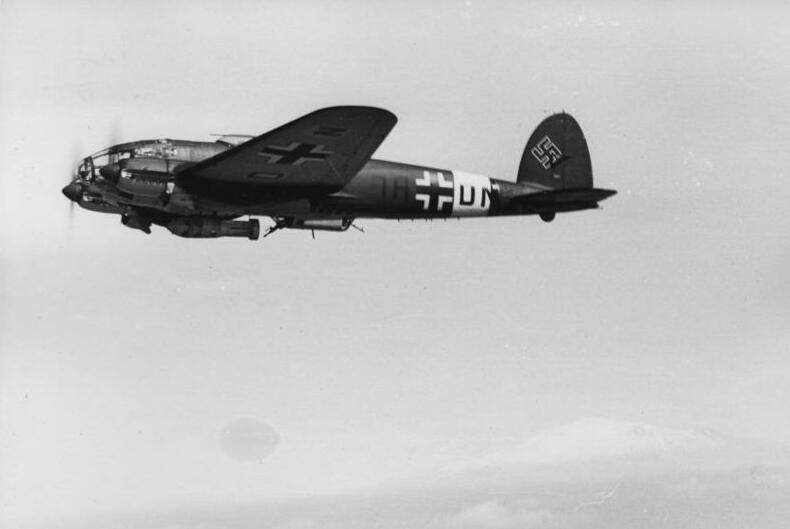
1941, Heinkel He 111 (code marking 1H DN) of Bomber Wing 26 (KG 26) inflight in March 1941 with an SC-1000 'Hermann' bomb suspended to its fuselage as part of its bomb armament.

KG 26 participated in the Battle of the Mediterranean, Battle of the Atlantic and operations on the Eastern Front, against the Arctic Convoys and the Soviet Navy over the Black Sea. I./KG 26 operated off the east coast of Britain from bases near Aalborg in Denmark. On 27 April it sank the catapult ship HMS Patia off the mouth of the River Tyne. By 15 June 1941 the Gruppe claimed one cruiser, one destroyer, 21 smaller ships and 436,186 GRT of merchant shipping.

After Operation Barbarossa the unit was engaged in operations over ground along the Murmansk railway, the port of Murmansk and Arkhangelsk, and Barents Sea. 3. Staffel and 2. Staffel withdrew to Italy to train in torpedo-bombing in February 1942. In March–July 1942 the units intercepted Convoy PQ 11, PQ 15, QP 11 PQ 16, PQ 17 and PQ 18. Against PQ 11 and 15 two ships were claimed sunk and one damaged. Against PQ 16 it claimed one sunk and two damaged. Intercepting PQ 17 two ships were claimed sunk and one damaged. Attacking PQ 18, the group carried out a massed torpedo attack known as the Golden Comb, developed as an anti-convoy measure. Several ships were claimed sunk, but for the loss of 12 He 111s and seven crews. The unit had to be rebuilt owing to losses and was placed under the command of Luftflotte 5 on 20 September 1942.

II./KG 26 moved to Sicily in January 1941 as part of Fliegerkorps X. After arriving, it lost six He 111s to an enemy air raid on 8 January 1941. On the night of 17/18 January 1941 12 He 111s were sent to bomb the Suez Canal. The range proved too great and I. Gruppe lost seven machines to fuel starvation. In the following weeks unsuccessful attacks were made on British warships in the Mediterranean. On 31 January it sank the freighter Sollum and minesweeper HMS Huntley. The unit also took part in missions over Malta, losing its first aircraft on 8 February 1941. During the Balkans Campaign the unit moved to Foggia in northern Italy and conducted raids against Yugoslavia as part of VIII. Fliegerkorps. The 6. Staffel, II.Gruppe, KG 26 (6.II./KG 26) was moved to Saki, in the Crimea and began operations over the Black Sea against the Soviet Navy. The unit claimed 20,000 BRT sunk in October–December 1941.

III./KG 26 suffered a number of name changed and was reformed four times. The first formation was ended on 20 February 1940, after being formed for the first time on 1 November 1939. I./KG 26 was renamed K.Gr. 26 on 20 February 1940. I./KG 26 was reformed on 20 February was a fresh formation for the second time. On 15 December 1941, the unit was renamed II./KG 100. That same day the third formation of III./KG 26 was made, with fresh personnel. In June 1942 the units was once again renamed, and its fourth formation was to continue until the disbanding of Kampfgeschwader 26 at the end of the war. III./KG 26 largely undertook Army support missions in 1942 when it operated various staffeln as anti-shipping units in France and Norway.

I./KG 26 left German occupied Norway in November 1942. The Gruppe was ordered to Grosseto to counter Operation Torch, the Anglo-American landings in Morocco and Algeria on 8 November 1942. I./KG 26 attacked Allied shipping and lost 11 He 111s in November. On 22 December 1942, Ju 88s from III Gruppe', KG 26 torpedoed and damaged the British troopship Cameronia. Strikes were made all along the African coast. Allied air attacks cost the unit four aircraft on 8 February 1943 when the units base at Cagliari-Elmas, Sardinia was bombed. In July 1943 the unit also contested Operation Husky, the Allied invasion of Sicily. On 12 August the unit struck at Allied shipping in the western Mediterranean losing 10 machines for little result. On 8 September I./KG 26 attacked the Allied beaches at Salerno without success. In late August early September the unit moved to southern France at Salon-en-Provence. On 26 November 1943 the unit flew its last mission off North Africa. Until July 1944 I./KG 26 continued to fly anti-shipping missions off Anzio and western Italy. In July it relocated to Denmark to rearm with Junkers Ju 88A-4 aircraft. It formed a Einsatzstaffel which was ordered to pick up torpedoes from Flensburg for operations in the Crimea. However while en route, the unit ran into United States Army Air Force P-51 Mustangs and lost nine aircraft. I./KG 26 did convert onto the Ju 88, but owing to fuel shortages the unit was merged into I. and III./Kampfgeschwader 77 in early June.

II./KG 26 operated in the Crimea and Mediterranean over the same period. In April – September 1942 it undertook missions over the Kerch area. Among the ships attacked and sunk, the most notable success was a Soviet Submarine chaser, sunk on 6 July. A number of attacks were reported against Soviet Destroyers and Cruisers in August. The unit at this time was fragmented. 6 staffel (or 6.II./KG 26) operated under II. Fliegerkorps, Luftflotte 2 in the Crimea, while 5 staffel (5.II./KG 26) fought under Luftflotte 5. In August 1942 6.II./KG 26 moved to Grosseto, Sicily. On 10 August 1942 it sank two freighters from the convoy Pedestal. 6 staffel continued operations off North Africa until May 1944. Other units, such as 4 staffel remained based in the Crimea and attacked Soviet shipping during the German evacuation of the Crimea. Both 4 and 6 staffeln relocated to Germany to retrain on the FuG 200 anti-shipping radar in April 1944. In June 1944 4, 5 and 6.II./KG 26 were located to France. These units were constantly moved, participating in attacks against the Allied landings in Southern France under Operation Anvil. II./KG 26 also attacked Allied Shipping in the English Channel and off the Isle of Wight at night after the Allied Normandy Landings. In August 1944 II./KG 26 retreated into Bavaria, Germany after the defeat in France.

III./KG 26 operated in the Mediterranean, France and Norway during July 1942 – August 1944. Its most notable action was attacking Convoy PQ 18 in September 1942, whilst operating from Banak, Norway. III. Gruppe lost 8 He 111s on that mission. Missions continued against the Torch, Anzio and Normandy landings. By June 1944 III./KG 26 had suffered 50% losses and reduced missions to 3 or 4 per week of a few aircraft. In August 1944 it was withdrawn to Germany to rearm with the Ju 88A-3 in September – October 1944. In December the unit was relocated to Gardermoen, Norway.

I./KG 26 was sent to Norway again after refitting in Denmark. It attacked several Allied convoys without result. On 10 January 1945 it was ordered to disband. Some pilots were sent to fighter units to retrain for Defense of the Reich duties. Other personnel were molded into Field Divisions in Denmark in February – March 1945. II./KG 26 relocated to Banak, Norway on 25 October 1944. It undertook anti-shipping missions against convoy JW/RA 64 south of Bear Island on 7–10 February 1945. It claimed 8 hits. The next day it claimed hits on 11 freighters, two Cruisers and two destroyers. The British however stated that no hits were made. On 23 February 1945 it flew its last combat mission sinking the Liberty ship SS Henry Bacon. In May 1945 it began to rescue encircled German soldiers from the Courland pocket as the Red Army closed in. The Gruppe's last operation, on 9 May 1945, was approved by the Western Allies. III./KG 26 also assisted in these operations. The two Gruppen surrender to Allied forces at Gardermoen and Trondheim, Norway on 9 May 1945.

== Commanding officers ==
The following commanders commanded the Geschwader:

Major-General Hans Siburg (1 May 1939 – September 1939)
Oberst Robert Fuchs (29 September 1939 – June 1940)
Oberstleutnant Karl Freiherr von Wechmar (July 1940 – 19 November 1940) Killed in action
Oberst Robert Fuchs (November 1940 – acting)
Oberstlt Benno Kosch (25 November 1940 – 11 February 1941)
Oberst Alexander Holle (December 1940 – June 1941)
Oberst Martin Harlinghausen (6 January 1942)
Oberst Karl Stockmann (November/December 1942 – 31 January 1943)
Oberstlt Werner Klümper (1 February 1943 – November 1944)
Oberstlt Wilhelm Stemmler (November 1944 – January 1945)
Oberstlt Georg Teske (February 1945 – 9 May 1945)

== Bibliography ==
- Steenbeck, Alexander (2012): Die Spur des Löwen. Der Weg des Löwengeschwaders durch Europa. Lübeck ISBN 978-3-00-038734-0.
- Bergstrom, Christer (2007). Barbarossa – The Air Battle: July–December 1941. London: Chevron/Ian Allan. ISBN 978-1-85780-270-2.
- Bergström, Christer, (2007), Stalingrad – The Air Battle: 1942 through January 1943, Chevron Publishing Limited ISBN 978-1-85780-276-4
- Bergström, Christer (2007). Kursk – The Air Battle: July 1943. Chevron/Ian Allan. ISBN 978-1-903223-88-8.
- Bergstrom, Christer. (2008). Bagration to Berlin – The Final Air Battles in the East: 1944 – 1945, Ian Allan. ISBN 978-1-903223-91-8
- de Zeng, H.L; Stanket, D.G; Creek, E.J. Bomber Units of the Luftwaffe 1933–1945; A Reference Source, Volume 1. Ian Allan Publishing, 2007. ISBN 978-1-85780-279-5
- Koop, Gerhard & Schmolke, Klaus-Peter (2003). German Destroyers of World War II. Annapolis, Maryland: Naval Institute Press. ISBN 978-1-59114-307-9.
- Larson, Knut Nordic Aviation during WW2, Part 7, Bombers KG26.
- Whitley, M. J. (1991). German Destroyers of World War Two. Annapolis, Maryland: Naval Institute Press. ISBN 1-55750-302-8.
