= Hans Ferdinand Geisler =

German general during World War II

Hans-Ferdinand Geisler
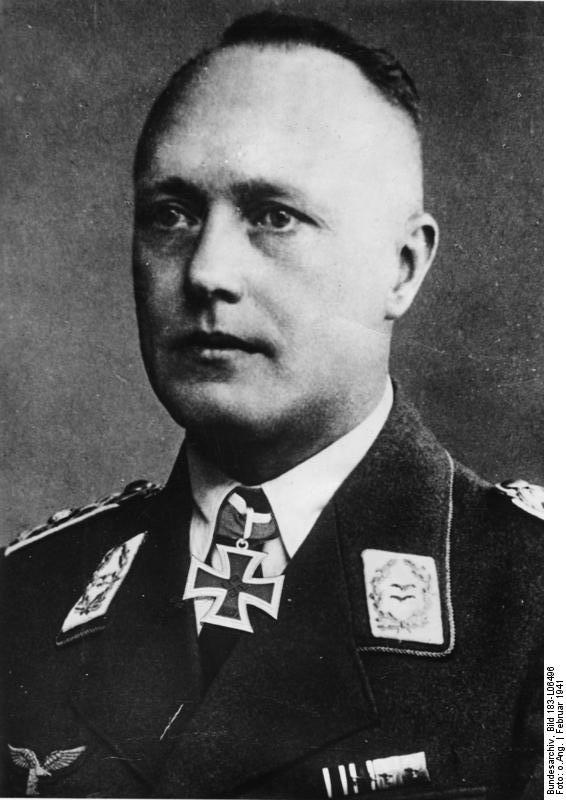
- Geisler in 1941
- Born: 19 April 1891; Hanover, German Empire
- Died: 25 June 1966 (aged 75); Freiburg im Breisgau, West Germany
- Military career
- Allegiance: German Empire; Weimar Republic; Nazi Germany
- Branch: Imperial German Navy; Reichsmarine; Luftwaffe
- Service years: 1909–1942
- Rank: General der Flieger
- Commands: 10th Air Corps

Hans-Ferdinand Geisler (19 April 1891 – 25 June 1966) was a German general during World War II.

== Military career ==
Born in Hanover in April 1891, Geisler joined the Kaiserliche Marine (Imperial German Navy) on 1 April 1909 as a Seekadett, prior to World War I and served during the entire conflict. He continued his career serving in the Reichsmarine, the Weimar Republic Navy, until joining the newly formed Luftwaffe in September 1933. He ultimately reached the rank of General der Flieger in July 1940. As commander of X.Fliegerkorps from 2 October 1939 to 31 August 1942, he used his background as a sailor to specialise in anti-shipping aerial operations. He was awarded the Knight's Cross of the Iron Cross on 4 May 1940. He retired in October 1942 and died on 25 June 1966 in Freiburg im Breisgau.

== Promotions ==
- April 12, 1910, Fähnrich zur See
- September 19, 1912, Leutnant zur See
- May 2, 1915, Oberleutnant zur See
- January 21, 1920, Kapitänleutnant
- January 1, 1928, Korvettenkapitän
- January 1, 1933, Fregattenkapitän
- September 1, 1934, Oberst
- April 1, 1937, Major General
- April 1, 1939, Lieutenant General
- July 19, 1940, General der Flieger
