= Kampfgeschwader 1 =

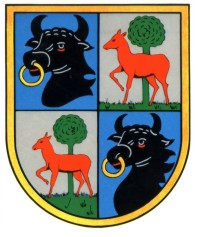
- The Hindenburg family crest, the emblem of KG 1
- Active: 1 May 1939 – 5 September 1944
- Country: Nazi Germany
- Branch: Luftwaffe
- Type: Bomber
- Role: Air interdiction close air support Offensive counter air Maritime interdiction Strategic bombing
- Size: Air force wing
- Nickname: Hindenburg
- Engagements: Invasion of Poland; Battle of Belgium; Battle of France; Battle of Britain; The Blitz; Eastern Front; Allied invasion of Sicily

Commanders
- Notable commanders: Josef Kammhuber

Insignia
- Identification symbol: Geschwaderkennung of V4

Kampfgeschwader 1 (KG 1) (Battle Wing 1) was a German medium bomber wing that operated in the Luftwaffe during World War II.

KG 1 was created in 1939 as the Luftwaffe reorganised and expanded to meet Adolf Hitler's rearmament demands. It was founded in May 1939 and by December 1939, had three active Gruppen (Groups). In August 1940 a fourth Gruppe was added. KG 1 operated the Heinkel He 111 medium bomber and later the Heinkel He 177 heavy bomber.

KG 1 served in the Invasion of Poland on 1 September 1939 which began the war in Europe. It spent the Phoney War on reconnaissance operations and dropping propaganda leaflets over France. In May and June 1940 it fought in the Battle of Belgium and Battle of France. In July 1940, the force took part in the Battle of Britain and The Blitz.

In June 1941 it supported Operation Barbarossa, the invasion of the Soviet Union. Elements of the bomber wing remained on the Eastern Front for the duration of the conflict. KG 1 also served intermittently in the Italian Campaign from March–August 1943. All KG 1 Gruppen ceased to exist by September 1944 and were merged with other Luftwaffe units before the German capitulation in May 1945.

== History ==
Kampgeschwader 1 (KG 1) was formed from Stab/KG 152 'Hindenburg' at Neubrandenburg on 1 May 1939. Generalmajor Ulrich Kessler was its first commander (Geschwaderkommodore). The Geschwader (Wing) was named after the deceased General Paul von Hindenburg. The unit was assigned the Hindenburg family crest as its emblem.

I./KG 1 was formed from IV./KG 152 at Kolberg. The Gruppe (group) was assigned the Heinkel He 111 medium bomber. The first batch of aircraft were E variants, with traditional stepped-cockpit, in contrast to the widely recognised Stepless cockpit of the later He 111P and -H models. The Gruppe was placed under the command of Gruppenkommandeur (Group Commander) Oberstleutnant Robert Krauss.

II Gruppe were formed from the disbanded I./KG 152 at Breslau-Schöngarten (today Wrocław Airport), Silesia. It is possible this Gruppe was to be used as I.(K)./LG 3 (Lehrgeschwader—Learning Wing). It was formed on 18 September 1939, with the war in Europe already underway. Oberstleutnant Benno Kosch was its first commanding officer.

Elements of I. and II. Gruppen provided the personnel for founding III./KG 1 on 1 December 1939. Major Otto Schnelle was given command. The Stab. and I. Gruppe were placed into training which lasted throughout the summer, 1939. KG 1, with only one full Gruppe active in September 1939, remained at Kolberg.

== Operational history ==
Stab./KG 1 was assigned to Luftflotte 4, commanded by Alexander Löhr under the 2nd Fliegerdivision at Kolberg. I. Gruppe, still with the He 111E was also at Kolberg, was subordinated to Löhr also. On 14 September 1939, both were transferred to 1st Fliegerdivision, under the command of Luftflotte 1 headed by Albert Kesselring. The two commands combined fielded 47 He 111s, with 41 combat ready. Löhr began the invasion with 729 aircraft. All nine of Stab./KG 1's were operational. The command unit was equipped with the H variant.

=== Invasion of Poland and Phoney war ===
KG 1 was based on the Baltic Sea coast. Its mission was to support the 4th Army's invasion of the "Polish corridor", capture of Gdynia, and assist the 3rd Army, advancing from East Prussia, in destroying the Pomorze Army.

On the opening day, 1 September 1939, the Wehrmacht invaded. The Luftwaffe planned an enormous air attack on Warsaw, codenamed Operation Wasserkante, while also destroying the Polish Air Force on the ground. The plan was revised after complaints from the General Staff of the Wehrmacht (Oberkommando der Wehrmacht). Luftflotte 4 was impeded by severe mist which covered its airfields on that morning. Nevertheless, I./KG 1 were one of only four Gruppen to take off on time. The group struck at airfields in Puck, Rumia and Toruń. It also bombed Polish Army forces at Kościerzyna and Starogard Gdański. Polish forces at Bydgoszcz and Danzig, were also bombed on 3 September. The Bydgoszcz Główna railway station was probably the target. On 3 September KG 1 attacked the Polish Navy, in support of the Kriegsmarine. With II. and II./StG 2, IV(St)./LG 1, 3./KüFlGr 706 and 4.(St)/TrGr 186, it bombed the Naval Aviation Dyon, the torpedo boat Mazur, tender Nurek, damaging the Wicher and the minelayer Gryf, which were later finished off by 4.(St)/TrGr 186.

Polish targets in the Toruń and Bydgoszcz regions were attacked again on 4 September and the Gruppe moved to Ziethen, Brandenburg later in the day. From its new operating base it flew rail interdiction operations northeast of Warsaw on 5 September and Kutno the following day. Road and rail interdiction missions were flown against Polish traffic along the Rava-Ruska lines on 8 September. It moved back to Schongarten on 8 September and flew against targets east of the Vistula from 8–12 September. Along with II./KG 26, I./KG 53 and I./KG 2 it bombed Iłża, to break up the concentred forces of the Prusy Army, and operated in the Battle of Radom. Against, Löhr's objections, incendiary bombs rather than high explosive bombs were used.

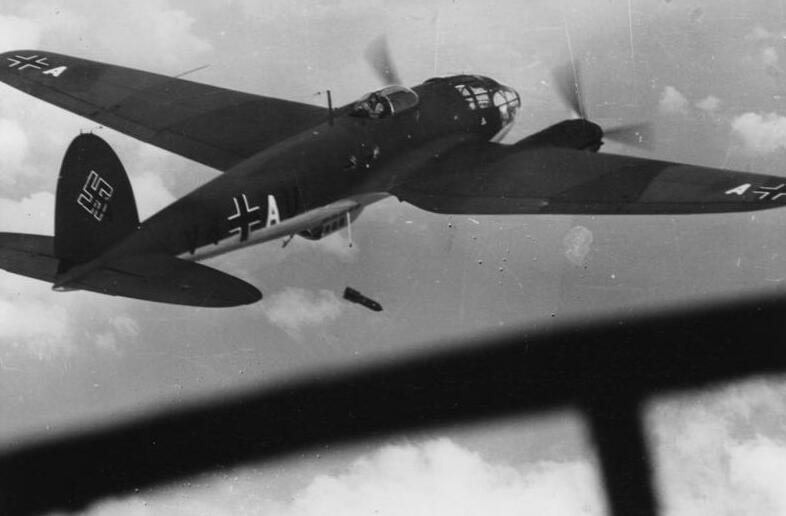
A He 111P over Poland, September 1939

KG 1 also bombed Polish troop concentrations in the Battle of Bzura. Piątek was targeted by KG 1 on 13 September. On 14 September KG 1 was placed under the command of Bruno Loerzer and 1st Fliegerdivision, under the command of Luftflotte 1, to support the 14th Army's attacks in southern Poland, alongside KG 26 and KG 55. KG 1 bombed rail lines near Kowel on 15 September, and then it moved to Krosno. Its last recorded operations were flown against rail traffic between Kowel and Luzk on 16 September 1939. The group was taken out of operations no later 21 September.

I./KG 1 spent the Phoney War in training. It moved to Faßberg Air Base on 16 October 1939 and to Giessen on 10 November. At Giessen it trained in mine-laying until 2. Staffel (squadron) left to become the nucleus of KGr 126 on 21 February 1940. The unit was renamed III./KG 26. At that time, I./KG 1 replaced 1./KG 4, which began to train on air supply missions. I./KG 1 began its training on 10 February. The reorientation to mine-laying occurred because Hitler refused Hermann Göring's request to attack ports in the British Isles until he had ordered Fall Gelb. Instead, Hitler issued Directive 9, which called for attacks on British sea communications. The Luftwaffe was to focus on mining operations until the land offensive began. 2. staffel was later refounded at Nordhausen. From 25 March 1940 I. Gruppe began dropping propaganda leaflets over eastern France.

II. Gruppe moved to Neubrandenburg on 21 September and on to Delmenhorst on 1 October. Until April 1940 it remained in training. From 16 October 1939 it was based at Lüneburg. From at least 20 April 1940, it began reconnaissance and leaflet dropping over France. After briefly transferring to Erfurt, it moved to Kirtorf/Hesse on 9 May 1940. III./KG 1 spent the winter, 1939–40 working up and training. It moved to Nordhausen and became fully operational on 2 February 1940. From 20 April 1940, it also flew night sorties, reconnaissance and leaflet dropping missions over eastern France.

The Stab./KG 1 flew operations on 1 September 1939 against targets along the Vistula River. Thereafter it was moved to Ziethen from Kolberg on 4 September. It was placed under the command of Luftflotte 4 at Breslau on 8 September. It may have taken part in the Battle of Bzura on 10 September but was moved to the 2nd Fliegerdivision on 14 September. After relocating to Neubrandenburg it was placed under 1st Fliegerdivision, belonging to Luftflotte 1 on 20 September. It was based at Delmenhorst from 1 October, Lüneburg from 16 October, and then Giessen on 10 November 1939 under the IV. Fliegerkorps. Over the winter the Stab./KG 54 was moved to I. Fliegerkorps (Luftflotte 3) with five bombers, three operational, on 10 May 1940.

=== Western Europe ===
KG 1 was assigned to Fliegerkorps IV on 10 November 1939. The date at which it was transferred to Fliegerkorps I, subordinated to Luftflotte 1 by 10 May 1940. The Fliegerkorps was placed under the overall command of Luftflotte 3, commanded by Hugo Sperrle, just prior to the offensive. Based at Giessen Stab./KG 1 had three of five He 111H bombers operational. Ulrich Kessler had relinquished command on 17 December 1939 to Oberst Ernst Exss, who assumed leadership of KG 1 on 18 December. The command of I./KG 1 was taken over by Major Ludwig Maier in November 1939. All other Gruppen retained their commanding officers. I. Gruppe could muster 25 operational Heinkels from 35. II./KG 1, at Kirtorf, had 35 at its disposal with 23 operational. III. Gruppe at Ettinghausen on 9 May, contributed 27 serviceable bombers from 33. All three Gruppen possessed the H variant.

On the morning of 10 May 1940, Fall Gelb began. I./KG 1 took off and attacked the La Fère and Amiens – Glisy Aerodrome. It also bombed rail stations at Beaumont-Hamel, France and Philippeville, Belgium. II./KG 1 bombed four airfields: Cambrai-Niergnies Airport, Liège Airport, Albert – Picardie Airport and Valenciennes-Denain Airport. III./KG 1 bombed the same targets and an aircraft factory near Albert. No 60 Wing RAF engaged III./KG 1 with No. 85 Squadron RAF, and claimed three bombers shot down. 6. and 7. Staffeln lost a bomber each to No. 607 Squadron RAF, of the 61st Wing RAF with both crews. III./KG 1's attack on the Potez factory near Albert was met by Hawker Hurricanes and 607 claimed another three of the German bombers. German records shot show III. Gruppe suffered the loss of five on 10 May with another two seriously damaged. Two complete crews were killed and one captured. The biggest casualty was Major Schnelle. The Gruppenkommandeur was shot down and killed two miles east of Saint-Quentin, Aisne. In later operation, I./KG 1 flew more missions in the Ghent-Brussels-Antwerp area and it lost another bomber. The purpose was to support the 4th Army in southern Belgium. It continued to do so from 11 to 16 May.

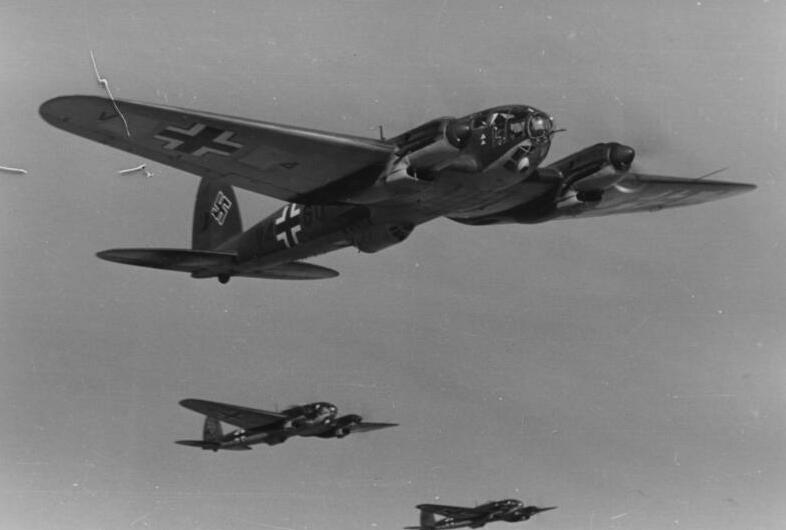
KG 1 bombers, 21 June 1940

II. Gruppe supported the 4th Army's advance over the same period. It was ordered to support the drive into the Loire Valley by attacking tank concentrations and rail targets along the line of the advance. The Gruppen switched to Cologne Butzweilerhof on 20 May. KG 1's activities in the intervening period are uncertain, but II./KG 1 operated over Cambrai on 17 and 18 May. I. and II Gruppen began night attacks on Boulogne in the battle for the port. All three Gruppen undertook bombing and armed reconnaissance operations as the Battle of Calais and Battle of Dunkirk. KG 1 began maritime interdiction operations to prevent the Dunkirk evacuation from 21 to 31 May 1940. On 27 May, the first full day of the evacuation, KG 1 bombed the east mole, with KG 54, though the latter probably sank the 8,000-ton French Navy steamer Aden.

On 3 June 1940 II./KG 1 took part in Operation Paula as did III./KG 1. Six other bomber wings took part in the attack; KG 2, KG 3, KG 4, KG 30, KG 54 and LG 1. JG 2, JG 53, JG 54, JG 77 and ZG 26, provided fighter escort. The German bomber stream was sighted over Reims-Coulommiers, and Cambrai. A French Potez 630 from GC I/3 shadowed the formation. It reported the height and direction of the bombers via radio to the Eiffel Tower. The message was garbled and many French fighter units failed to understand it and scrambled too late. Large air battles developed but losses of KG 1 are unknown. 15 factories were hit, but only three suffered significant damage. 254 civilians and 652 were injured.

The airfields hit were damaged. On the 13 airfields, only 16 aircraft were destroyed and six damaged. Six runways had been put out of action, and 21 motor vehicles destroyed. Twenty-one military personnel were killed. The commander of KG 51, Josef Kammhuber, was shot down and captured during Paula. He would later command KG 1, albeit for only five days. German bomber losses amounted to just four. Six German fighters were lost. 35 French aircraft were lost in total.

On 4 June I and II Gruppe moved to Amiens – Glisy Aerodrome, KG 1's target on the opening day of the offensive. III./KG 1 moved to Lille–Vendeville. II. and III. Gruppen supported the 4th Army's drive into the Loire Valley and the advance to Le Havre from 5–11 June in support of Fall Rot, the second phase of the offensive. I. Gruppe attacked targets in Orléans on 14 June and attacked shipping in Brest and Cherbourg harbours from 15 to 19 June 1940. On the night of the 18/19 June 1940, III./KG 1 and II. and III./LG 1 bombed the port of Bordeaux and flew 30 sorties the following day involving flights of up to 480 kilometres.

II. and III./KG 1 supported the effort against the ports. III. Gruppe moved to Rosieres-en-Santerre Airfield, after operating from forward strips near Boulogne from 20 June. It transferred six days after the French surrender on 1 July 1940.

=== Battle of Britain ===
After the Armistice of 22 June 1940, the Luftwaffe settled into airfields along the French, Belgian and Dutch coasts. The British refusal to surrender or come to terms with Germany, precipitated Adolf Hitler's order for Operation Sealion, an amphibious invasion of Britain which was to take place after Luftwaffe had secured air superiority over the English Channel. The German Air Staff, Oberkommando der Luftwaffe (OKL), was ordered by Hermann Göring, to begin attacks on targets in southern England after the publication of his 30 June directive.

Stab./KG 1 and all three Gruppen remained under the command of Fliegerkorps I. The command unit was based at Amiens – Glisy on 11 June, and remained there until 13 August. I. Gruppe was based at Montdidier and Clairmont in late June. It began night sorties over the United Kingdom from 22 June 1940 to test RAF Fighter Command night fighter defences. It flew an operation over London on 4 July. II./KG 1 also engaged in probing attacks on shipping in the English Channel. It carried out bombing operations on some industrial targets and airfields, in what the Germans referred to as the Kanalkampf phase of the Battle of Britain. III. Gruppe was reorganised into an operational training unit, similar to RAF organisations. It had little direct part in the air war over Britain, although it was sent on a small number of air raids against RAF airfields and industrial targets at night from 17 to 25 August. On 15 July it possessed 32 Heinkels, with 15 operational. Stab./KG 1 had all four bombers operational. I. and II Gruppen had 23 operational from 27 and 29 from 31 respectively.

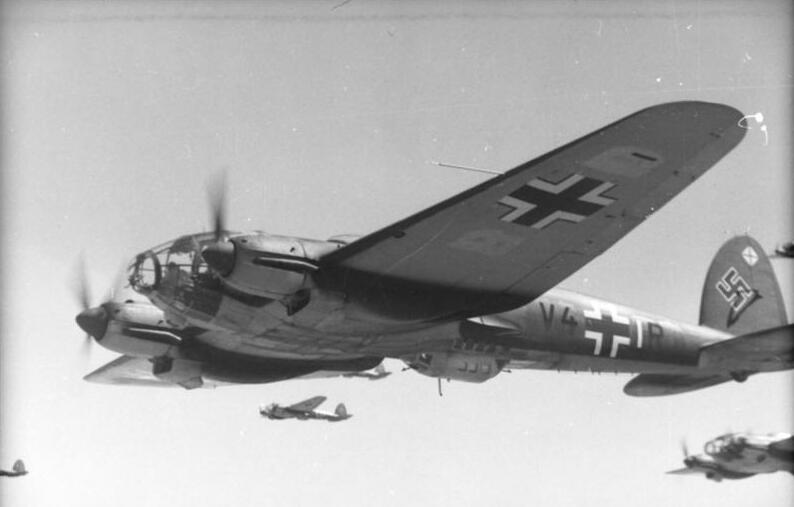
A 7th Staffel KG 1 Heinkel He 111 on a mission during the Battle of Britain, 1940

The probing attacks cost KG 1 its first casualties on 5 July. One II. Gruppe bomber force-landed at Amiens to engine failure and at 6:30, 8 staffel lost a He 111 shot down and the crew killed in action, when it was intercepted by a Supermarine Spitfires from No. 65 Squadron RAF. The crew were the first KG 1 fatalities of the campaign.

The Battle of Britain opened on 10 July. On this first day, the Royal Air Force (RAF) sent Bomber Command to attack Luftwaffe airfields in France. II./KG 1's base at Amiens was attacked by No. 607 Squadron RAF. The six Bristol Blenheim's began there attack in cloudy weather but it was not sufficient to protect them. Anti-aircraft artillery shot five of the six down before German fighters could intervene. The following day 1. Staffel lost two bombers destroyed and another severely damaged when KG 1 attempted to bomb the Portsmouth Naval Shipyard. The bomber formation was intercepted by Hurricanes from No. 145 Squadron RAF and Spitfires from No. 601 Squadron RAF. The former accounted for both destroyed aircraft. On 12 July 1940, KG 1 lost its Geschwaderkommodore Ernst Exss, who was shot down and posted missing in action. Josef Kammhuber, the future commanding officer of the German night of fighter force, took his place until 17 July. On 3 August KG 1 sent a small number of Heinkels over Kent. The intruders avoided interception and one bomb struck a Royal Observer Corps post at Higham. The following day 7., 8. and 9. Staffeln suffered one damaged bomber each to unknown causes.

The battle moved inland on 13 August with Adlertag. On 16 August II./KG 1 attacked RAF Duxford. KG 1 bombed RAF Biggin Hill on 18 August—known as The Hardest Day because of high losses. KG 1 dispatched 60 He 111s from Amiens to conduct a high-level attack on Biggin Hill. KG 76, based in airfields to the north of Paris, was to attack RAF Kenley. KG 76 fielded 48 Dornier Do 17s and Junkers Ju 88s for a low-level attack. Fighter escort was provided by JG 3, JG 26, JG 51, JG 52, JG 54 and ZG 26. The Jagdgeschwader were ordered to carry out free-hunting and close escort from bases in the Pas-de-Calais. The mission went awry, and KG 76 suffered heavy losses. KG 1 lost two bombers; one each from 1. and 2. Staffeln in combat with 65 Squadron. JG 54 prevented No. 610 Squadron RAF from inflicting more losses while KG 1 was on its bomb-run, but 65 Squadron was able to intercept with the German fighter unit was locked in combat.

II. Gruppe flew night operations against industrial areas from 17 to 25 August. III. Gruppe were among the few German units to fly on 27 August 1940 because of deteriorating weather conditions. Near Portland in the early morning, Flying Officer Peter O'Brian and Pilot Officer William Beaumont from No. 152 Squadron RAF, engaged and shot down a III./KG 1 bomber flown by Gruppenkommandeur Major Willibald Fanelsa, who was captured with his crew. Fanelsa had been appointed to replace Hans Steinweg only days earlier. Hauptmann Otto Stams took command on 1 September 1940. The following day, KG 1 was involved in the morning air battles and lost one bomber fifty percent damaged after action with No. 79 Squadron RAF. 4. Staffel lost one bomber and two crew members killed and two wounded when an external bomb fell off during take-off and detonated.

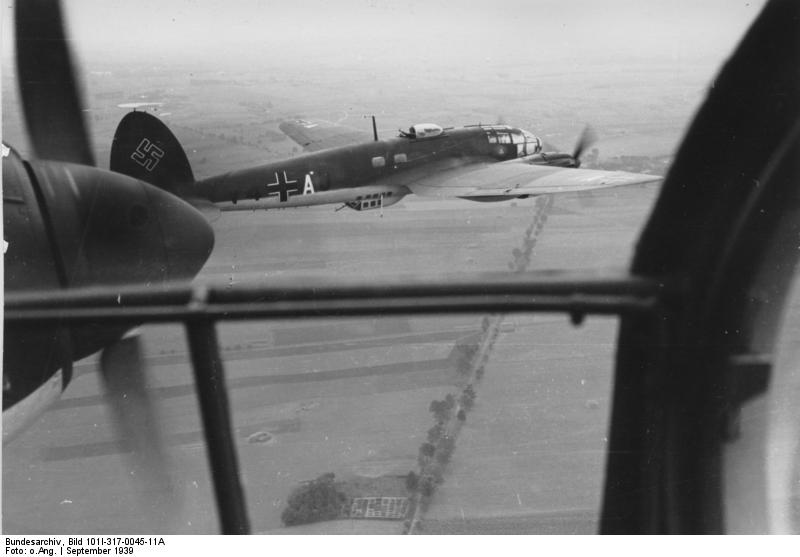
KG 1 Heinkels at low-level. The photograph is taken from the bomb-aimer's position in the tip of the nose.

On 30 August 30 He 111s from II./KG 1 targeted the Royal Aircraft Establishment. Escorted by Messerschmitt Bf 110s, the Gruppe flew up the Thames Estuary but was intercepted by 26 Hurricanes of 1, 242 and 501 Squadrons. The bomber force penetrated as far at Luton, where 10 bombs were dropped on the Vauxhall Motors plant. The projectiles killed 53 people and caused 113 casualties in total. In the retreat to France KG 1 lost five He 111s. 5. Staffel bore the brunt of the losses with four and 6. Staffel lost one bomber. The battle was joined by 56 and 253 Squadrons, which were credited with one bomber each. 1 Squadron was also credited with a bomber destroyed while 242 Squadron destroyed two of the 5. Staffel bombers. 1 Squadron's victim was Staffelkapitän Hauptmann Baess, commanding 5. Staffel, who was killed in Werknummer 2720, V4+BV.

On 1 and 4 September 1940 I./KG 1 bombed Tilbury docks. One 6. Staffel bomber was sixty percent damaged by RAF fighters on the first operation. Major Ludwig Maier, Gruppenkommandeur of I Gruppe was killed on the night of the 4/5 September. Herrick and Pugh, crewing a Blenheim night fighter, shot down Maier and his crew at 02:15. Werknummer 3324, V4+AB, crashed and all the crew were killed. Hauptmann Hermann Crone replaced him.

On 7 September 1940, the Luftwaffe shifted its attention to Greater London. On this morning the London Blitz began with an assault upon the city by five Kampfgeschwader—1, 2, 3, 26 and 76. Bf 110s from ZG 2, and Bf 109s from JG 2, 3, 51, 52, 54, I./JG 77 and I. and II./LG 2 were sent to escort them. KG 53 was added as another eight Gruppen of 318 He 111s and Do 17s struck the capital. 306 people died and 1,337 were injured in the capital and another 142 killed in the suburbs. Two bombers from 3. and 4. Staffeln were lost, and Geschwaderkommodore Koch was wounded by RAF fighters. By 7 September, I Gruppe reported 22 from 36 He 111s operational.

On 9 September KG 1 mounted the single largest raid on this date. It appears the target was Farnborough again. II./KG 1 committed 26 bombers to the attack supported by 20 Bf 110s from ZG 76 and 60 Bf 109s from JG 3. The German intruders headed on a westerly course, to avoid the main concentration of RAF bases at Biggin Hill, RAF Kenley, RAF Croydon and RAF Northolt. The approach failed and nine RAF squadrons engaged the German flights. The British made a head-on-attack with around 70 fighters. The Bf 110s adopted a Lufbery circle and one staffel of bombers jettisoned their bombs over Purley and Epsom, and turned back. The fleeing bombers joined up with 40 Junkers Ju 88s from KG 30, which was under attack from 253 and No. 303 Squadron RAF. KG 30 lost five bombers. KG 1 suffered only three He 111s damaged—two with around sixty percent damage and one with thirty-five. III./ZG 76 lost three fighters and one damaged and JG 3 lost another three protecting KG 1.

KG 1 suffered heavier losses on 11 September. In an attack on London, 6./KG 1 suffered one bomber damaged as did 3. Staffel, which also lost one crew killed. Another crew were lost, and a third from the Stab./KG 1—for a total of three bombers destroyed and two damaged. On 15 September the Luftwaffe carried out large-scale attacks on London. KG 1 was involved and only 1. Staffel reported the loss of an aircraft. KG 1 are recorded in action on 29 September and 3. and 5. Staffeln lost one bomber and one damaged each. One more bomber was lost and two damaged in landing accidents on 3 October.

On a raid to London on night of the 4/5 October another II. Gruppe bomber was lost and a second damaged. Three Junkers Ju 88s, now beginning to arrive in KG 1 were destroyed in accidents in the following days. Accidents in night operations remained high. I. and II. Gruppe lost a bomber to ground fire on the night of 17 October. I./KG 1 persisted with attacks on airfields attacking RAF Horsham St Faith and RAF West Raynham on 27 and 29 October. I. Gruppe received support from III./KG 1, and both groups lost a bomber each night. II./KG 1 bombed airfields in the Norwich area on 29 October. II. and III. Gruppen began wholesale conversion to the Ju 88 at the end of October 1940.

=== The Blitz ===
The night offensive over Britain began, in earnest, in the month of October 1940. The Germans utilised navigational aids such as Knickebein, X-Gerät and Y-Gerät. The systems allowed the German bombers to navigate to target cities hundreds of miles from their bases. Pathfinder aircraft, from KG 55 and Kampfgruppe 100, were also used to guide the bomber stream to the target area. RAF night fighters were equipped with aircraft interception (AI) radar, but very few in number.

All three Gruppen of KG 1 were involved in bombing London on 1/2 November 1940 and carried out their assignment as the lead bomber formation that night (20:00–20:50). KG 76, KG 77, I. and II./LG 1, I./KG 27, 1./KG 54, II./KG 54, KGr 806, I./KG 55, II./KG 55, III./KG 55 supported the bombing operation. Other targets were bombed elsewhere this night. KG 1 returned to London on 4/5 November. III. Gruppe bombed Swanton Morley and West Raynham on 5 November. On night of the 6/7 November KG 1 was involved in the first and last waves of bombings from dusk till dawn. I./KG 1 attacked the city from 19:30–21:15 while II./KG 1 completed its attacks between 06:12 and 07:15. On 7 November II./KG 1 targeted Bacton–Norwich railway line. II. Gruppe bombed London again on 7/8 November while 7. Staffel bombed Honington on 8 November. On 9 November, in the early hours, KG 1 led I. and III./KG 77 to bomb Birmingham. It was KG 1's first operation in the Birmingham Blitz. The following night, 9/10 November, KG 1 flew two operations, both in full strength, against London.

In the early hours of 12 November I./KG 1 carried out five operations, the only group of KG 1 to do so. It bombed Brighton, London, Worthing, Dover and Horsham. III./KG 1 did the same on 13 November, against Woodford in Gloucester and Newton Heath. On 14/15 November KG 1 flew in full strength in a highly effective attack on Coventry, codenamed Operation Mondscheinsonate (Moonlight Sonata). I. Gruppe flew three further operations: against Eastbourne, Newhaven and Ramsgate. "Pathfinders" from 12 Kampfgruppe 100 (Bomb Group 100 or KGr 100) led 437 bombers from KG 1, KG 3, KG 26, KG 27, KG 55 and LG 1 and they dropped 394 short tons (357 t) of high explosive, 56 short tons (51 t) of incendiaries, and 127 parachute mines. Other sources say 449 bombers and a total of 530 short tons (480 t) of bombs were dropped. The raid against Coventry was particularly devastating, and led to widespread use of the phrase "to conventrate".

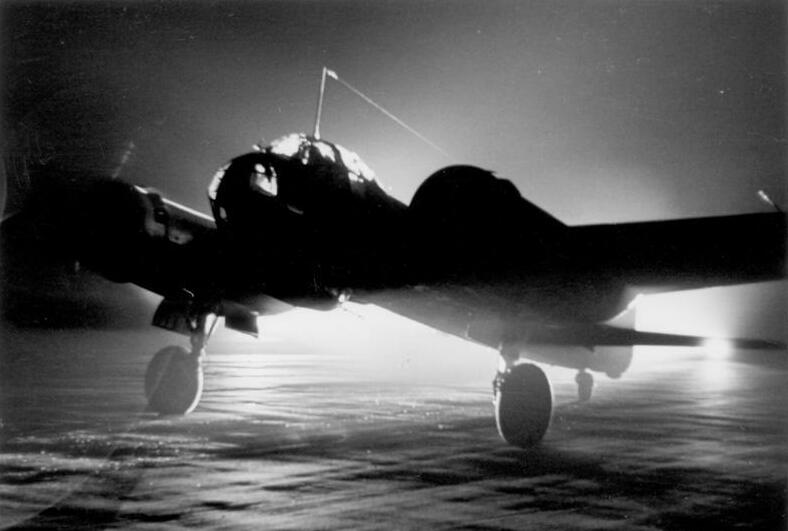
Ju 88 preparing for night operations, 1941. KG 1 began conversion to this type in October 1940.

London was targeted again on 15/16 November while KG 1 flew a full-strength bombing attack against Hastings. On 16/17 November two three-Gruppen attacks were made against London while I./KG 1 bombed Birmingham and Coventry again on 18/19 November. On 19/20 and 20/21 November KG 1 bombed Birmingham again with all three groups. I. Gruppe flew a second sortie to London while all three groups attacked an airfield in the north of London. KG 1 mounted particularly heavy air attacks on 22/23 November. It flew one full-strength operation against Birmingham and London. A third operation was carried out against Portsmouth, although Eastney and Eastleigh were hit instead. A fourth mission was flown against Eastbourne. On 24/24 November KG 1 turned to bombing Bristol, Birmingham and Coventry.

On 27/28 and 28/29 November KG 1 began all-group attacks over Plymouth and Liverpool; London (29/30 November), Bristol (2/3 December), Birmingham, London (3/4 December) by I./KG 1, Birmingham and Sheerness (11/12 December), Sheffield and Ramsgate (12/13 December), London (21/22 December and 22/23 December) with I. and III./KG 1 respectively, Manchester and London (23/24 December). KG 1 bombed London again on 29/30 December, a night which is referred to as the Second Great Fire of London because of the damaged caused by the Luftwaffe. Over 27,499 incendiaries and over 100 tonnes of bombs were dropped on London by 136 aircraft that night which caused a firestorm devastated the old City of London.

The Luftwaffe targeted ports in January 1941. In February port-targets became top priority, but planners persisted in operating against cities in the interior. III. Gruppe bombed Cardiff and Salisbury on 2/3 January, Dungeness (3/4 January), Hastings (9/10 January), Portsmouth (10/11 January), Southampton (19/20 January). III Gruppe completed January operations with bombing operations against Stechford, The Wash, twice on 22 January, Stetchford–Margate–Hayes and Portsmouth on 28 January. On 29 and 30 January 1941 III. Gruppe bombed Newcastle and then Stechford and London respectively. Night operations were complicated at this time with the emergence of Wing Commander Edward Addison's No. 80 Wing RAF which was dedicated to the jamming of high-frequency German beams; though the success of British countermeasures in 1940 and 1941 were minimal.

KG 1 used III. Gruppe to maintain pressure on Plymouth and Birmingham on 9/10 February. It was the only group operational that night. Stab and I./KG 1 flew against London on 14/15 February. Before midnight on 17 November, Sternford and Leominster were bombed; again III./KG 1 was the only element to fly operations. On 19/20 February KG 1 flew a full-strength attack on Southampton with KG 28, and also alone against Brighton. Port-operations were maintained on 20/21 with an attack on Swansea, Portsmouth, Eastbourne and Cardiff; a further all-out effort against Brighton, Cardiff and Southampton was made on 26/27 February.

KG 1 remained on operations into March 1941. Cardiff was bombed III./KG 1 on 1/2 March and by I./KG 1 on 3/4 March. Southampton was bombed by I. and III. Gruppe on 3/4 March. London was attacked by I. Gruppe on 8/9 and 9/10 March and by III./KG 1 on the latter date. I and III Gruppen also bombed Portsmouth on consecutive nights from 9–11 March. III Gruppe continued operation on 12/13 March against Liverpool, Eastbourne and Brighton. With first group, it made the Geschwader's first contribution to the Glasgow Blitz on 13/14 March; the group also attacked Margate, Grantham and Alton. I. and II. Gruppen flowed suite on 14/15 March, while I./KG 1 bombed Southampton. II./KG 1 completed the night's operations with an attack on Chatham. KG 1 continued to support the bombing operations and flew in the Hull Blitz for the first time on 18/19 March while I./KG 1 targeted Harwell.

KG 1 began April with an attack on Birmingham by third group on first night and Poole on the night of the 3rd and 4th. II./KG 1 were busiest on the night of 7/8; bombing Liverpool, Bristol and Glasgow. They were supported by III./KG 1 in the latter operation. KG 1 focused on the West Midlands; bombing Coventry and Birmingham from 8/9 to 10/11 April. On 15/16 April III. and II. Gruppen attacked Belfast, Northern Ireland for the first time. From 16 to 29 April London, Liverpool and Plymouth were the main targets for all three Gruppen. On the night of the 19/20 April, Adolf Hitler's 52nd birthday, London was attacked by 712 aircraft, the largest deployment of the month. It surpassed the 685 aircraft used on the 16/17 April attack.

In May, aside from previous targets, KG 1 was deployed against Great Yarmouth twice, and Hull, (3/4 May), Woodley (4/5 May), and Newcastle on 6/7 May with KG 76. From 8–10 May KG 1 bombed Nottingham twice, and Upper Heyford. On 11/12 April II./KG 1 bombed Watton and Sutton Bridge. From 19 to 27 May Ipswich, Lowestoft, Harwich, Dover, Hunstanton were bombed. KG 1's last Blitz operation came on 1/2 June 1941, when II. Gruppe assisted in a large attack on Manchester.

=== Eastern Front ===
KG 1 was relocated Powunden, East Prussia in early June 1941. Stab. II., and III./KG 1 were assigned to General der Flieger Helmuth Förster, commanding Fliegerkorps I. The air corps was subordinated to Luftflotte 1 under Generaloberst Alfred Keller. Keller's command existed to support the attack of Army Group North into the Soviet Union. The invasion, codenamed Operation Barbarossa, began on 22 June 1941. The noticeable exception was I./KG 1. The Gruppe was sent to begin training for maritime interdiction for Battle of the Atlantic in March 1941. On 1 April 1941 it was re-designated I./KG 40. It would not be reformed until 8 June 1942.

II. Gruppe reported 27 from 29 Ju 88s operational and the third group, 29 from 30. On the first day, KG 1, with KG 76 and KG 77 rendered critical air support to XXXXI Panzer Corps under the command of Georg-Hans Reinhardt. The German tank force was engaged by forces led by Fedor Kuznetsov. Kuznetsov ordered the mobilisation of the Baltic Military District (later named the Northwestern Front) to defend the Baltic States, annexed by the Red Army in 1939. The 3rd and 12 Mechanised Corps moved to initiate a pincer movement as the Germans advanced on Šiauliai. German air attacks destroyed 40 motor vehicles or tanks. The 23rd Tank Division and 12th Mechanised Corps sustained particularly heavy losses. Over the next three days, as the battle raged, the medium bomber force was asked to provide close air support because Luftflotte 1 lacked such aircraft. All three bomber groups suffered the collective loss of 18 aircraft to heavy Soviet anti-aircraft artillery. Keller was forced to repeat these operations on 28 June. Southwest of Riga, KG 1 lost six Ju 88s this way. KG 1 was moved to Mitau, a forward base in the Daugavpils–Riga area, to support the 4th Panzer Army's breakout from the Daugavpils bridgehead. A notable loss for KG 1 was the commander of second group, Otto Stams, who was wounded in action on 27 June. Stams was replaced by Emil Enderle.

III. Gruppe was heavily involved in operations. It bombed Red Air Force airfields at Ventspils, Liepäja, Jelgava and Riga from 27 to 28 June. From 1–4 July it bombed Soviet troop concentrations at Jelgava and over southern Latvia. After the capture of Jelgava it moved there on 5 July to support attacks on airfields in Estonia. The group also interdicted rail lines between Lake Ilmen and Lake Peipus. The group attack Luga on 10 July. On this day a formation from KG 1 was intercepted by Polikarpov I-16s from 154 IAP. Pilot Sergey Titovka carried out a taran attack on Feldwebel Paul Kempf's bomber. KG 1 reported the loss of three Ju 88s.

II./KG 1 carried out similar operations and it bombed Leningrad on 3 July. It extended its sphere of operations into the Baltic Sea and Gulf of Finland, attacking Soviet shipping and the Baltic Fleet. Both groups moved to Saborovka. It focused on rail and road targets near Bologoye on 23 July while supporting the general advance to Leningrad. Attacks against Soviet shipping took priority in late August: between Narva and Kronstadt. In September attacks on naval traffic on Lake Ladoga and in the Gulf of Finland became the focus of KG 1's operations. KG 1 was also active against the Soviet evacuation of Tallinn. On 28 August KG 77 and KGr 806 sank the 2,026 gross register tons (GRT) steamer Vironia, the 2,317 GRT Lucerne, the 1,423 GRT Atis Kronvalds and the ice breaker Krišjānis Valdemārs (2,250 GRT). The rest of the Soviet fleet were forced to change course. This took them through a heavily mined area. As a result, 21 Soviet warships, including five destroyers, struck mines and sank. On 29 August, the Ju 88s accounted for the transport ships Vtoraya Pyatiletka (3,974 GRT), Kalpaks (2,190 GRT) and Leningradsovet (1,270 GRT) sunk. In addition, the ships Ivan Papanin, Saule, Kazakhstan and the Serp i Molot were damaged by I./KG 4, which also sank three more. Some 5,000 Soviet soldiers died.

KG 1 was also active in the Luftwaffe's traditional interdiction role. Gerhard Baeker's III./KG 1 severed the rail lines to Luga on 16 August. The success of the attack forced the Soviets to abandon Kingisepp. II. Gruppe was removed from the front on 12 September to re-equip with the Ju 88A-4 until 9 October. All remaining aircraft were handed over to III./KG 1. As Army Group North neared Leningrad, all the bombers of the first air fleet began bombing operations against the centre of the city: beginning the Siege of Leningrad. On 8 September 27 Ju 88s dropped 6, 327 incendiary bombs, starting 183 fires. The targets were the Badayevo warehouses holding supplies for the trapped Soviet forces and the city's civilians. An entire reserve of sugar weighing 2,500 tons was destroyed. Bombing commenced around the clock, a systematic attempt to destroy the city. Most air raids were confined to the night, because of heavy ground fire and the arrival of 5, 7, 44 and 191 IAP fighter regiments.

On 28 September and into early October operations against rail lines in the Lake Ilmen. It moved to Dno airbase on 17 October. It continued interdiction, or disruption, operations against Tikhvin (29 October), Yaroslavl (31 October), Shum (19 December) and Chudovo on 29 December 1941. II. Gruppe returned to Saborovka on 9 October and bombed rail lines southeast of Leningrad from 9–13 October. It moved to Staraya Russa on 23rd. It was in action over Bolshoi-Dvor lines on 17 December. Both groups fought against Soviet counteroffensives in the Lake Ilmen area until the end of December, and the ultimate failure of Barbarossa. Before the year was out, II./KG 1 lost its second commander, Emil Enderle, posted missing in action on 3 November.

=== To Stalingrad ===
II. and III. Gruppen remained on operations opposing the Soviet winter offensives. On 2 January, with KG 4, it bombed the ice roads and unloading port of Osinovets. In January 1942, KG 1 bombed targets around Staraya Russa, Kholm and the Volkhov River into February and until 20 March. From 26 March–3 April 1942, KG 1 flew bombing and supply missions over the Demyansk Pocket. Luftflotte 1 carried out 3,185 sorties in the first month of 1942. KG 1. and I./KG 4 flew 913 bomber sortied in the Volkhov and 473 in the Demyansk area. The wing commenced Operation Eisstoss, against Kronshtadt port on 4 April and continued to support trapped German Army units in the Kholm Pocket. KG 1 remained mostly active around Kholm–particularly in opposition to the Toropets–Kholm Offensive–and the Volkhov front in April and May 1942, with sporadic attacks on Lake Ilmen (22 April) Leningrad (24 April).

II./KG 1 returned to Germany to rest and refit in May. III./KG 1 retained a small contingent at Pskov, but moved to Insterburg, East Prussia on 21 April. The group returned rapidly and were apparently in the Kholm area by 30 April. III. Gruppe moved to Rozhkopolve from 21 May to 1 June. By 8 June the group was back at Dno with II Gruppe. I./KG 1 was re-created on 8 June at Lübeck-Blankensee but was sent to Avord in France. From there it flew night operations over Great Britain from 5 August (Baedeker Blitz), including bombing operations against the Dieppe Raid. The group returned to the Eastern Front on 3 September 1942. That same day Geschwaderkommodore Hans Keppler was killed in action and replaced with Heinrich Lau.

From 22 June 1942 II./KG 1 flew armed reconnaissance over the Gulf Finland. In July 1942 the group moved to Bryansk on Army Group Centre's front. Several Staffeln flew anti-tank operations. from 10 to 27 July. Within the same timeframe, 11 to 16 July, it attacked rail, troop and tank concentrations in the Sukhinichi, Kozelsk and Belyov sectors. By 20 July the group was operating in the Pola River and combated Soviet breakthroughs in the Battles of Rzhev from 7 August 1942. Acting as fire-brigade support in the north, the group supported Operation Wirbelwind; a counteroffensive east of Roslavl near Sukhinichi from 9–27 August. By 20 September it could must 10 operational Ju 88s, from the 26 available to it. III./KG 1 repeated these operations but spent slightly longer operating over Bryansk (7–27 July) and Operation Wirbelwind. In September it flew support for the army in Demyansk and Lake Ilmen, before moving to Morosovskaya on 6 October, to support Operation Blue, and Army Group South in the Battle of Stalingrad before withdrawing to East Prussia again on 31 October.

II. Gruppen was joined by I./KG 1 in the south under the command of Wolfram Freiherr von Richthofen's Fliegerkorps VIII. The first group returned to the East and began operations over the familiar Demyansk area. Its operational condition was better than the other Gruppen and it could employ 21 of the 33 Ju 88s available to it. On 7 October both groups began operations over Stalingrad and the northern Caucasus. It bombed Grozny on 10 October and Stalingrad on 16th before being removed to the Orsha on the central sector, and subordinated to Fliegerdivision 1 on 3 November. KG 1 responded to Richthofen's 14 October call for an all-out attack on the city. In 2,000 sorties the Germans dropped a total of 600 tons of bombs. KG 1 lost three Ju 88s. II./KG 1 was pushed deeper in the south as the Battle of the Caucasus reached a climax. It bombed Astrakhan on 18 October but was withdrawn to Orsha on the same day as I./KG 1. Consequently, KG 1 missed the final stages of the battle which ended in the destruction of Axis armies in Stalingrad. Nevertheless, II./KG 1 lost Gruppenkommandeur Heinz Laube killed in an accident on 8 December.

=== Final operations in the East ===
I. Gruppe returned under the command of Oberstleutnant Hellmut Schalke until July when Major Werner Dahlke took command. It was rushed into action in the Rzhev sector into November. On 26 November 1942, KG 1 flew its 20,000th mission. In December 1942 it fought in the Battle for Velikiye Luki. From Orsha, it moved to Kharkov and Volchenko on 25 December to bolster the defences on the Don River. It abandoned the area on 17 January 1943 to avoid being overrun. During the transfer it moved to IV. Fliegerkorps and conducted a fighting withdrawal against infantry and tank targets. Based at Kiev, from 5 February, the group flew in the Third Battle of Kharkov. It also operated from Poltava Air Base before moving north, to Kolty near Narva. On consecutive nights from 19 to 21 March, the airfield was bombed costing two Ju 88s destroyed and four damaged. The group bombed targets around Lake Ladoga from 23 March and left the Soviet Union until May 1944. II./KG 1 carried out similar operations, differing only in its earlier retirement to Königsberg for rest and refit from 19 to 30 December. The group did not return to the Eastern Front until June 1944.

III./KG 1 handed its aircraft to II Gruppe when it left for East Prussia on 31 October 1942. It returned in January 1943 and remained on the Eastern Front until July. Hauptmann Werner Kanther became the last-but one commanding officer in October 1942; he held command until the first disbandment of the unit in April 1944. On 9 March, (Eis)/KG 1 was created. It was equipped with the Ju 88C and trained for specialised train-busting operations. It remained supporting Army Group North until June 1943 until it was transferred to Luftflotte 6. It served on the Volkhov, Kolpino and Kholm. It assisted German forces hold the line at Krasny Bor after the Battle of Krasny Bor. On 2 June KG 1 bombed the rail station at Kursk, in preparation for Operation Citadel; it also bombed Leninsky, Yelets and Voronezh.

The command staff of the Luftwaffe used this idea to free their service from the air support role. Robert Ritter von Greim's Luftflotte 6, with support from Luftflotte 4, was assigned seven bomber wings to carry out a strategic bombing offensive—KG 55, KG 3, KG 4, KG 27, KG 51, KG 53 and KG 100. Factory Number No. 466 at Gorkiy with five percent total and one-tenth of all fighter engine production were the targets. Three of the five ball bearings plants were in range, the synthetic rubber plant at Yaroslavl (23 percent of output) and oil refineries along with steel plants were all considered. Surviving intelligence maps show the crude oil and ball bearing plant at Saratov was also considered. In the end phase, the production of tanks and armoured vehicles received the weight of the attacks. The facilities at Gorkiy drew most attention for it produced 15 percent of T-34s and was the largest plant west of the Urals. In error, planners targeted the State Motor Vehicles Plant No. 1 Molotov, the largest automobile plant in the country which produced the less threatening T-60 and T-70. The Krasnoye Sormovo Factory No. 112 was targeted because of its production of munitions.

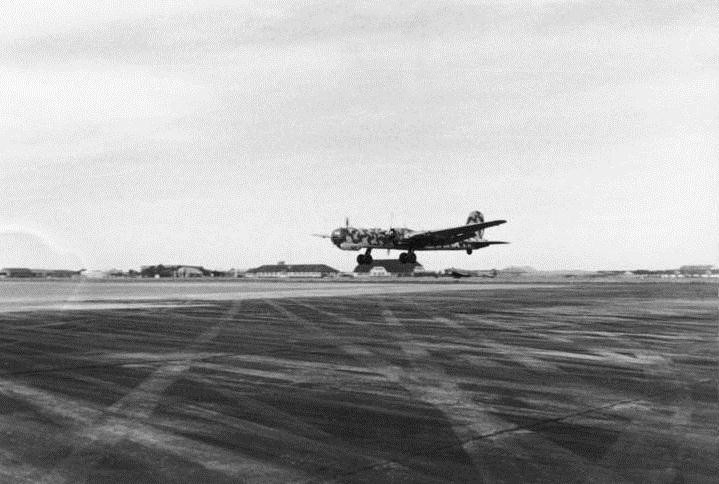
The He 177. KG 1 was the only unit to use large numbers on the Eastern Front.

Third group was the only element of KG 1 to take part, from 5 to 8 June. It bombed the synthetic rubber plant on 20 June. It lost two aircraft. During repeated attacks between 4 and 22 June, all of the plant's 50 buildings, 9,000 metres of conveyors, 5,900 units of process equipment and 8,000 engines were destroyed or damaged. Russian authorities have still not disclosed how many people were killed. German wartime estimates are 15,000, but are not supported. Owing to failed intelligence and targeting, the attacks against the Molotov factory disrupted the T-70 light tank. Roughly half of the Soviet light tank production—5, 134 from 9, 375 in 1942, was made there. Factory Number 112, produced the T-34 tank, which was only lightly affected by the raids. Repair was rapid, and completed within six weeks. Night fighter and search light defences were also increased. The factory was fully operational by 18 August. In the fourth quarter of 1943, it superseded production quotas by 121 percent.

When Citadel began III./KG 1 carried out bombing operations until 13 July. It moved to Bryansk on 14 July and attacked Soviet armour when Operation Kutuzov broke through to Orel on 20 July. The Gruppe lingered on the Eastern Front until 2 August 1943, when it appears to have been withdrawn. Only the specialist 9.(Eis)/KG 1 Staffel remained. On 20 July it moved back to Seshchinskaya and operated from Stari Bykhov from 18 September. In October 1943 it helped Army Group Centre contain the Orsha offensives. It may have been transferred to Flensburg to convert to the Ju 88P. In mid-March it was re-designated 14(Eis)./KG 3. III. Gruppe disbanded in mid-April 1944. 7. and 8. Staffeln re known to have retrained as anti-tank units at Flensburg until 12 August and the aircraft were given to 9.(Eis)./KG 1. Only one month later, the Gruppe was reformed by the re-designation of I./KG 100. It began training on the Heinkel He 177 but never became operational again. It was dissolved at Prowehren East Prussia, on 25 August 1944.

II./KG 1 returned to the front under the command of IV. Fliegerkorps after action in Italy and the Mediterranean. Equipped with the He 177s, the bomber group flew against railheads from June 1944, as the Soviet summer offensive opened. It was ordered by Reichsmarschall Hermann Göring to attack tanks and act as close air support. Using the heavy bomber in this way was disastrous: Oberstleutnant Horst von Riesen carried out the orders with reluctance and lost two on the 26th, another two on 27th and a fifth bomber on 28 June. It bombed rail yards at Kalinkovichi and Gomel, and at Velikaya Luki on 26 June. Fuel shortages forced the group to be withdrawn and disbanded on 28 July at Brandis. Flight personnel were sent to I./JG 7, operating the Messerschmitt Me 262 fighter jet. It was formally renamed I./JG 7 on 5 September 1944.

In July KG 1 made its last substantial contribution in Lithuania. It counted the Soviet Vilnius Offensive and slowed preparations for the Kaunas Offensive. The Soviet supply base at Molodechno, southeast of Vilnius, at Minsk, Velikiye Luki and Novosokolniki were repeatedly attacked by night bombers. On 20 July Riesen led all 70 of KG 1's operational He 177 bombers on a daylight raid against Velikiye Luki rail station. Riesen flew so high Soviet fighter aircraft could not intercept and the bombing caused mass devastation to the station and town for no loss. On 23 July, the crews struck again and reported large fires and explosions after bombing Molodechno. KG 1 was ordered to disrupt Soviet rail traffic in the Lublin sector—to contain the Lublin–Brest Offensive. On 25 July the He 177s repeated effective attacks. At the Bug River, near Brest-Litovsk, the bombers destroyed the headquarters of the Soviet 80th Army Corps, killing the commander in the process. On 28 July KG 1 carried out its last bombing mission of the war when it attacked concentrations of the 2nd Guards Tank Army.

I./KG 1 remained in Laon, France from April and June 1943 before serving in Italy. It also began training on He 177s from September 1943 and handed its Ju 88s to KG 54 and KG 76. At Burg from 18 November 1943, it made slow progress and suffered many accident losses from 15 March. By the end of April it could field 22 He 177s. Considered operational, it transferred to East Prussia at Prowehren and Seerappen in June. In June and July it attacked Soviet tank formations and on one operation, under the command of Major Manfred von Cossart, nearly bombed Adolf Hitler's headquarters, the Wolf's Lair. It disbanded at Brandis on 20 August 1944 and personnel were sent to JG 7.

=== Italian Campaign and the Mediterranean ===
KG 1 was rushed to Piacenza in June 1943 after the North African Campaign ended with the defeat of Axis forces. From here I./KG 1 was moved to Viterbo on 10 July. The Allied invasion of Sicily (Operation Husky) provided the bomber group with the immediate task of destroying Allied shipping the Mediterranean. From this date it attacked harbours in Algeria and Tunisia. It moved further south to Foggia on 26 July, but serviceability was poor: just five of the 18 Ju 88s were operational by 20 August 1943. Bombing operations over Syracuse (17, 22 July), Augusta harbour (21 July), Malta (22 July), Gela (27 July), Palermo (4 August) and Syracuse again on 10 August degraded operational readiness. The Allied invasion of Italy took place on 3 September and I./KG 1 recorded its last sortie off Naples on 8 September.

II./KG 1 arrived in Grottaglie on 28 March and was subordinated to II. Fliegerkorps, subordinated to Luftflotte 2. It flew supply operations to Tunisia in an attempt to overcome the effects of Operation Flax. It also flew anti-submarine warfare operations and aerial escort for convoys from 10 to 27 April 1943. It bombed Bŏne harbour on 15 May, days after the Battle of Tunisia ended in the capitulation of Axis forces. It also bombed Oran harbour and then moved to Sardinia on 19 May. From June to August to flew against the landing in Sicily and the invasion of Italy, mainly in anti-shipping roles which decimated the group. Based at Foggia on 20 August 1943, it had 11 operational to 21 Ju 88s on strength. On 9 September it handed its aircraft to KG 54 and KG 76. The personnel temporarily acted as occupation forces near Airasca in the Province of Turin, when Italy changes sides before departing Italy for the last time on 4 November 1943 for conversion to the He 177 at Burg.

== Commanding officers ==
The following commanded KG 1:

- Major General Ulrich Otto Eduard Kessler, 1 May – 17 December 1939
- Oberst Ernst Exss 18 December 1939 – 12 July 1940
- Oberst Josef Kammhuber 12–17 July 1940 (acting)
- Major General Karl Angerstein 18 July 1940 – 1 March 1942
- Major Herbert Loch 2 March – 30 June 1942
- Oberstleutnant Paul Schemmel 1 July – 14 August 1942 (killed in action 14 August 1942)
- Major Hans Keppler 15 August – 3 September 1942 (killed in action 3 September 1942)
- Major Heinrich Lau 4 September 1942 – 15 March 1943
- Obstlt Horst Von Riesen 17 March 1943 – 25 August 1944
