= DNO =

DNO or Dno may refer to:

== Organisations ==
- Danish Nurses' Organization, a trade union for nurses in Denmark
- Director of Naval Ordnance, British Admiralty administration
- Distribution network operator, companies licensed to distribute electricity in Great Britain
- DNO ASA, a Norwegian oil company
- Dutch National Opera, based in Amsterdam, the Netherlands

== Places ==
- Dno, a town in Russia
  - Dno (air base), a former air base near Dno
