= Rvy =

Rvy (Russian: Рвы) is the name of several rural localities in Russia:

- Rvy, Pskov Oblast, a village in Dnovsky District of Pskov Oblast
- Rvy, Tula Oblast, a village in Rassvetovsky Rural Okrug of Leninsky District of Tula Oblast
