= Kampfgeschwader 3 =

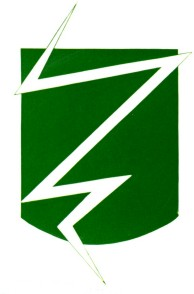
- Active: Formed: 1 May 1939; Disbanded officially: 18 August 1944; Disbandment still underway by 10 September 1944.
- Country: Nazi Germany
- Branch: Luftwaffe
- Type: Bomber Wing
- Role: Air interdiction close air support Offensive counter air Maritime interdiction Strategic bombing
- Size: Air Force Wing
- Nickname: Blitz
- Engagements: Polish Campaign; Battle of Belgium; Battle of France; German invasion of Yugoslavia; Battle of Greece; Battle of Crete; Eastern Front

Insignia
- Identification symbol: Geschwaderkennung of 5K

Kampfgeschwader 3 "Blitz" (KG 3) was a Luftwaffe bomber wing during World War II .

KG 3 was created in 1939 as the Luftwaffe reorganised and expanded to meet Adolf Hitler's rearmament demands. It was founded in May 1939 and by December 1939, had three active Gruppen (Groups). KG 3 operated the Dornier Do 17 and Junkers Ju 88 medium bombers.

KG 3 served in the Invasion of Poland on 1 September 1939 which began the war in Europe. It spent the Phoney War on reconnaissance operations and dropping propaganda leaflets over France. In May and June 1940 it fought in the Battle of Belgium and Battle of France. In July 1940, the force took part in the Battle of Britain and The Blitz.

In June 1941 it supported Operation Barbarossa, the invasion of the Soviet Union. KG 3 remained on the Eastern Front for the duration of the wing's existence as a bomber unit. III./KG 3 became the last Gruppe in the Luftwaffe to operate the Dornier Do 17. The Gruppe was also converted to the Heinkel He 111 and used as a delivery platform to launch V-1 flying bombs against the United Kingdom from the spring to late summer, 1944.

KG 3 was ordered to disband on 18 August 1944 but by the 10 September the dissolution of the wing was still ongoing. All Gruppen ceased to exist by October 1944 and were merged with other Luftwaffe units before the German capitulation in May 1945.

== History ==
Kampfgeschwader 3 was formed on 1 May 1939 at Fürstenwalde in eastern Germany with Stab/KG 3 on 1 May 1939. The Stab unit was transferred to Ebling, East Prussia before the end of May. Oberst Wolfgang von Chamier-Glisczinski became the first Geschwaderkommodore. KG 3 was equipped with the Dornier Do 17Z.

II and III Gruppen were formed near Magdeburg and Altenburg–Thuringia, respectively, on the same day. All Gruppen were allocated the Do 17. III Gruppe was formed from III./KG 153. From May–August 1939 the three units underwent intensive training in the Do 17. II./KG 3 was placed under the command of Hauptmann Ernst Exss from 1 May 1939, but he was replaced by Oberst Viktor Seebauer until the 1 July. Oberstleutnant Erich Munske was the Gruppenkommandeur upon the outbreak of war. III./KG 3 was commanded by Oberstleutnant Hans Grund, but he was replaced by Oberstleutnant Karl Neuhüttler on 1 July. Oberst Albrecht Jahn was the group's first wartime commanding officer.

I Gruppe was not formed until 19 September 1939 near Burg, made up of personnel from II., and III.Gruppe. The group was placed under the command of Oberstleutnant Rudolf Gabelmann. It likely became operational on 1 March 1940, after over five weeks of training during the winter, during which it "worked up" on the Dornier Do 17Z.

== War service ==
In August 1939, the operational Gruppen were transferred to Luftflotte 1. The mechanics of the Elbing airfield were able to ensure seven of the nine Do 17s belonging to Stab/KG 3 were operational. At Heiligenbeil II./KG 3 could commit 36 operational bombers from 38 to action. III./KG 3 were equipped with 39 bombers, with 30 combat ready at Heiligenbeil. KG 3 were in a position to offer support for Fall Weiss, the attack on Poland, with 86 bombers. Luftflotte 1 was to support the German 3rd Army, attacking from Prussia, and the main elements of Army Group North attacking the Polish Corridor. By 1 September KG 3 was based at Heiligenbeil under the Luftwaffenkommando Ostpreussen (Luftwaffe Command East Prussia) under the command of Wilhelm Wimmer. The command was independent from Luftflotte 1, and was to support the 3rd Army's drive Toruń, Płock, Warsaw and Polish Corridor.

=== Poland and the Phoney War ===
On the 1 September 1939 German forces invaded Poland. III./KG 3 attacked Polish positions defending the Tczew bridge. Despite the attack, and another from StG 1, the Poles repaired the wires and blew up the bridge two hours later. Both Gruppen were involved in the Battle of Grudziądz. They were involved in operations over the Narew, Praha. KG 3, paired with KG 27 under Wimmer, pushed southward from 6 September to isolate Warsaw from the east. They supported the advance on Warsaw and the subsequent siege. Both groups bombed targets in the Battle of Modlin. KG 3 losses are unknown, but II./KG 3 lost a bomber in mid-air explosion owing to a faulty fuze; with III./KG 4, and I./KG 152 from 3–6 September 1939. KG 3 bombed targets around Płock, Lida and Biała Podlaska. Both groups participated in the Battle of the Bzura and the destruction Army Poznań and Army Pomorze.

The Geschwader ceased operations on 21 September 1939 and were ordered to western Germany to face a possible Allied attack, which petered out. III./KG 3 was ordered to Fritzlar, southwest of Kassel and then moved to Würzburg for five months until 5 April 1940. Karl Neuhuttler handed over command to Albrecht Jahn on 1 July and Jahn was replaced as group commander on 2 March, by Major Wilhelm-Georg von Kunowski, with Jahn moving to II./KG 3. II./KG 3 was based at Schweinfurt until May 1940. The group command was change to Oberstleutnant Albrecht Jahn in April, but only to the 16 May, when he was replaced mid-campaign, but Hauptmann Otto Pilger. I./KG 3 was based at Kitzingen from 16 April 1940 in preparation for the offensive. The unit did not participate in Operation Weserübung but instead spent the spring training and resting in preparation for the western offensive in 1940.

=== Western Europe ===
Stab./KG 3 was placed under the command of II. Fliegerkorps Generaloberst Bruno Loerzer at Würzburg. von Chamier-Gliczinski's command unit had all six Do 17s operational on the opening day of Fall Gelb, the attack on France and the Low Countries. Gableman and I./KG 3 mustered 35 Dornier Do 17s, with 31 combat ready at Aschaffenburg. Jahn's II./KG 3 fielded a lower number of serviceable aircraft, 27, from 36 available. Kunowski's III Gruppe had 28 serviceable from the 35 Dorniers allotted to them. All Gruppen were placed under Loerzer's command. KG 3 was to support the operations of Army Group A, as it sought a break through in the Ardennes region—the critical objective of the Manstein Plan.

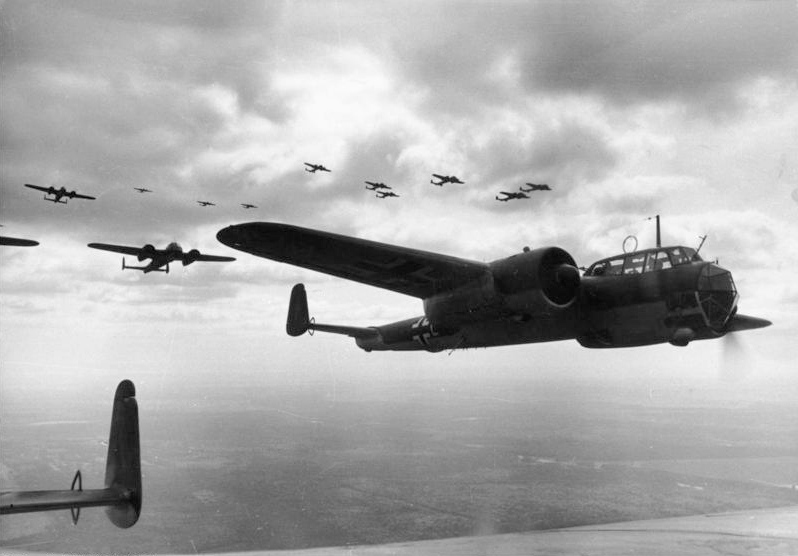
Dornier Do 17s over France, June 1940. The Do 17 bomber was operated by KG 3 until November 1941, more than any other unit.

On 10 May 1940 the offensive began and the Luftwaffe sought to gain air superiority. III./KG 3 struck at French Air Force bases in the Metz and Verdun area—Toul-Croix de Metz Airfield and Étain-Rouvres Air Base. The result was a disaster for KG 3 and II Fliegerkorps, which lost 23 aircraft and destroyed only 19 Allied aircraft. It was the highest daily loss of any German air corps in the campaign. Among the destroyed bombers were 19 Do 17Zs, eight of them from KG 3, and all to the Curtiss P-36 Hawks of Groupe de Chasse I/5. The French fighters intercepted the elements of KG 3 as they attacked Suippes airfield—very little damage was done though the nearby village was destroyed and casualties were heavy. 8. Staffel are known to have been engaged by No. 1 Squadron RAF and lost at least one bomber, over the northern Maginot Line. 9./KG 3 were intercepted by Edgar Kain, from No. 73 Squadron RAF, and lost one bomber near Metz. A lone bomber from 7./KG 3, piloted by Unteroffizier Wolfganag Gräfe was shot down by 1 Squadron over Metz, but return fire forced a Hawker Hurricane to crash-land.

KG 3 was active in supporting the advance in southern Belgium. On 12 May the main area of operations for the Luftwaffe was in the Charleville-Mézières and Rethel areas. Loerzer's command was offered support for the Panzer Divisions of the German 12th Army. I. and II./KG 3 operated in the Vouziers sector. Large air battles developed and II./KG 3 were intercepted by No. 501 Squadron RAF, GC II/2 and GC III/7. The German formation lost two bombers destroyed and one damaged. One Hurricane was shot down by return-fire.

The bomber groups supported the German breakthrough at Sedan from 12 May. I./KG 3 bombed and destroyed Reims – Champagne Air Base on 15 May. II./KG 3 was also active in the Compiegne area on 19 May. KG 3 supported the destruction of the Belgian Army in both Ostend and Zeebrugge. In late May it bombed harbours and Allied shipping in the English Channel for the duration of the Siege of Calais and Battle of Dunkirk, in a bid to prevent the British Army and French Army evacuations, at least until 27 May 1940, and perhaps to early June. On 25 May the Luftwaffe began its first major attacks on Dunkirk. It dropped 320 bombs and destroyed the lock gates and inner and out harbour facilities. Air operations cost the Germans 30 aircraft. KG 3 lost 12 Dorniers. Loerzer also used KG 3 in night harassing attacks and bombing French railways.

KG 3's Gruppen were at unknown bases in June. They may have still operated from Germany. The wing was involved in Operation Paula on 3 June 1940. The purpose of the operation was to attack airfields and factories in the Paris area. KG 3 operations for the duration of Fall Rot are not clear. It is believed that it supported Army Group A and Army Group C encircle the Maginot Line and supported the advance to Switzerland. KG 3 were one of four bomber formations ordered to assist the storming of the Maginot defences on 18 June 1940. In the event, the Armistice of 22 June 1940 preempted the operation.

=== Battle of Britain ===
The Luftwaffe rapidly reorganised the Luftflotten in France, Belgium and the Netherlands in June and July 1940. The British refusal to surrender or come to terms with Germany, precipitated Adolf Hitler's order for Operation Sealion, an amphibious invasion of Britain which was to take place after Luftwaffe had secured air superiority over the English Channel. The German Air Staff, Oberkommando der Luftwaffe (OKL), was ordered by Hermann Göring, to begin attacks on targets in southern England after the publication of his 30 June 1940 directive.

Stab./KG 3 was moved to Le Culot, Belgium with seven aircraft (three operational). It remained under the command of II Fliegerkorps. The air group was assigned to Luftflotte 2 under Albert Kesselring. I./KG 3 was placed under the command of Wilhelm-Georg von Kunowski from 23 July, replacing Gablemann who continued to command in the early stages of Channel operations. First group was moved to Le Culot also. The group mustered 28 operational Do 17Z bombers from 36. Otto Pilger's II./KG 3 had 27 bombers from 36 available at Antwerp and III./KG 3 had 25 from 30 available by 13 August under Erich Rathmann at Sint-Truiden Air Base.

The initial German air raids against shipping became known as the Kanalkampf. I./KG 3 had begun probing attacks on the United Kingdom the day after the French surrender. It carried out a night sortie on 23 June. I./KG 3 experienced its first loss of the air campaign on 2 July 1940 when an I./KG 3 Do 17 piloted by Oberleutnant Scharpkowski and three crew were posted missing in action. On 9 July it carried out a night bombing raid on the East Midlands and West Midlands. In the morning II./KG 3 lost an aircraft to No. 257 Squadron RAF, and another the following day to No. 66 Squadron RAF. On 23 July II./KG 3 lost a bomber to the RAF Fighter Interception Unit, equipped with airborne radar. The last loss of the Kanalkampf phase occurred on 6 August in action with No. 85 Squadron RAF plus two in accidents.

Dornier Do 17Z Werknummer 1160: one of the KG 3 Dorniers lost on 26 August 1940

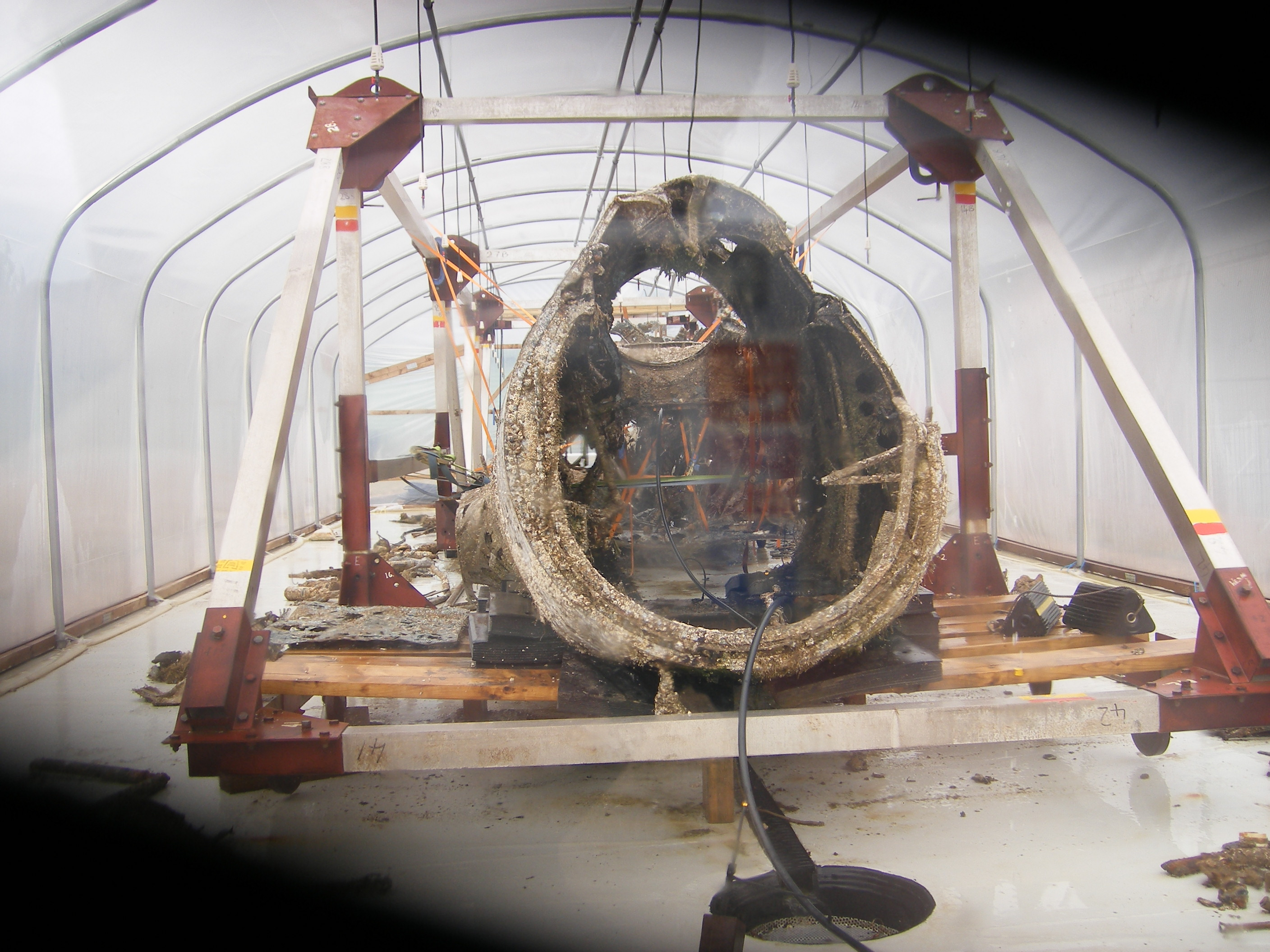
The fuselage, upside down with the cockpit area nearest the camera

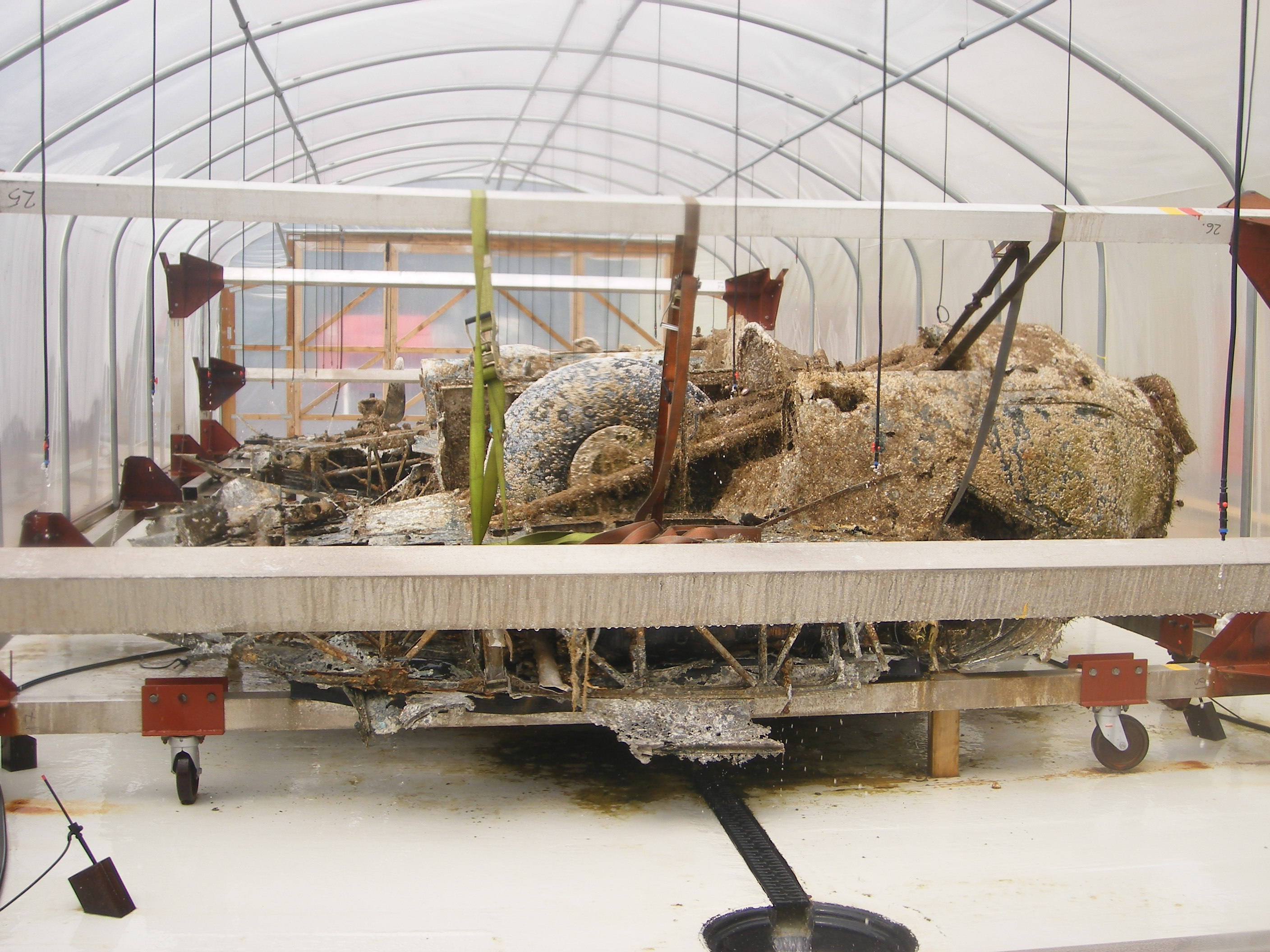
Port engine nacelle; note the tyre is still pressurized

On 13 August, the Germans initiated Adlertag (Eagle Day), intended to strike a crippling blow at RAF Fighter Command. In the afternoon, a force of 80 Do 17s of KG 3—escorted by JG 51, JG 52, JG 54 and 60 JG 26 (some 270 aircraft in all)—headed for RAF Eastchurch airfield and the Short Brothers factory at Rochester. III./KG 3 broke away from the main formation and attacked Eastchurch while II./KG 3 headed for Rochester. The RAF's No. 3, No. 64, No. 111, No. 151, No. 234, No. 249, No. 601 and No. 609 Squadrons intercepted. According to the account of JG 26, the British fighters made little impression on the bombers. Three JG 51 Bf 109s were shot down in skirmishes with RAF fighters, but KG 3 reported no losses. Over 100 high explosive bombs were dropped with incendiary bombs. The Airmen's quarters was severely damaged along with the officer's mess and 16 men were killed. All the hangars were hit and No. 266 Squadron RAF's hangar was destroyed. One Supermarine Spitfire was destroyed but all ammunition stores and tanks and much equipment was lost. The water mains were also damaged. The attack on the factory producing the Short Stirling heavy bomber—carried out by Otto Pilger—was so devastating it ended production for three months.

On 15 August 88 Do 17s from KG 3, led by von Chamier-Glisczinski were ordered to destroy RAF Croydon. Around 130 Messerschmitt Bf 109s from JG 51, JG 52 and JG 54 provided fighter escort while another 60 Bf 109s from JG 26 carried out fighter patrols over Dover. Over Deal, Kent, the bombers were engaged by 36 British fighters from three airborne squadrons, 111, 151 and 64 Squadrons. Four more were scrambled. The fighter screen was effective and only two KG 3 losses were reported. No claim was made for a bomber by British fighters: presumably the pilots responsible for the two missing German crews were killed in the combat. Five Do 17s were damaged: one from 2 staffel and four from 6. Staffel, which also lost the two bombers. Among the casualties was II Gruppe commander Carl Freiherr von Wechmar, who was wounded in action. Wechmar had taken command from Kunowski on 5 August, and was replaced by Günther Heinze.

On 20 August III./KG 3 struck at Eastchurch again. 27 Do 17s escorted by 30 Bf 109s from I./JG 51 flew up the Thames Estuary. No. 615 Squadron RAF accounted for the lost 9./KG 3 machine reported missing on the raid. On 21 August II./KG 3 carried out attacks on RAF Horsham St Faith. The weather was poor, but keen to keep the pressure on Fighter Command, Kesselring sent out small raids of three aircraft. The 6./KG 3 Dorniers flew over Norfolk were detected and No. 611 Squadron RAF destroyed all three aircraft. Another 4./KG 3 was lost in action with No. 242 Squadron RAF.

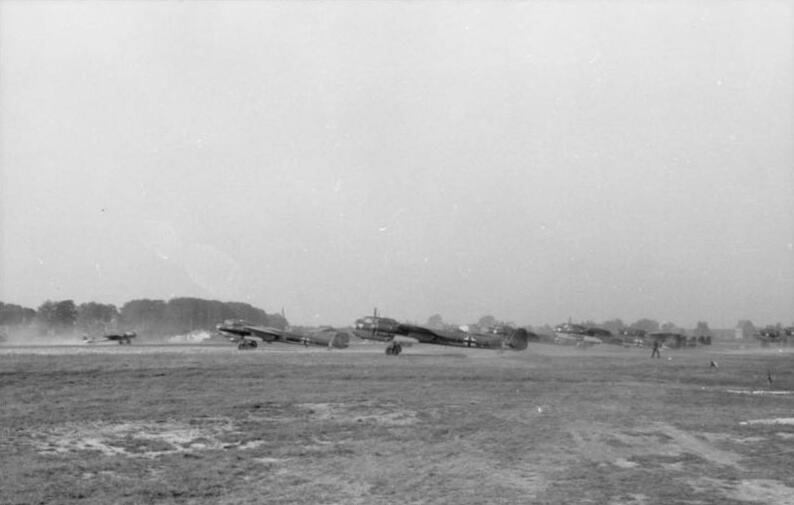
A staffel of Do 17s from KG 3 running their engines up prior to a sortie, September/October 1940.

Five days later 80 Do 17s—40 from KG 3 and 40 from KG 2—were ordered to bomb RAF Debden and RAF Hornchurch. The bombers were escorted by 80 Messerschmitt Bf 110s and 40 Bf 109s. The heavy fighters were from ZG 26 and ZG 76. A large number of Bf 109s were sent ahead of the bombers and found no British aircraft. They returned low on fuel as the German bombers started out. Their absence would cause the failure of the attacks. The formation split in the Thames Estuary. KG 2 proceeded north to Debden but aborted the attack well south. Only six to eight Dorniers carried out the attack and escaped in pairs. The KG 3 element also failed to reach the target, returning west of Rochford, with 1, 65 and 615 squadrons in pursuit. Some bombers headed due south, north of Chatham, Sittingbourne and Faversham. The Dornier gunners managed to shoot down three 1 Squadron fighters, killing one pilot. The escorting fighters shot down four 615 Squadron pilots, all of whom survived. 7./KG 3 lost one bomber and another damaged to 1 Squadron and another destroyed to 610. Boulton Paul Defiant fighters from No. 264 Squadron RAF damaged another. One of these aircraft was recovered from the Goodwin Sands in 2013. It was Werknummer 1160, which failed to return.

On 28 August I./KG 3 bombed Eastchurch and II./KG 3 attacked Rochford airfield. KG 3 carried out a joint operation with I. and III./KG 53. The bomber stream split, 27 Do 17s from I./KG 3 headed to Eastchurch and 77 Heinkel He 111s from KG 53 headed to Rochford. The KG 53 attacked failed but escorted by 60 Bf 109s from I. and II./JG 51, KG 3 forced their way through. The Bf 109s repulsed attacks by 501 and 615 Squadron. KG 3 dropped 100 bombs on the field which destroyed several light bombers and caused extensive damage to the airfield. Air reconnaissance reported the failure of KG 53's attack. In response II. and III./KG 3 was ordered to undertake a high altitude (18,000 ft (5,500 m)) bombing raid up the Thames Estuary to Rochford. 1 Squadron destroyed a Do 17 from 6./KG 3. 54 Squadron lost two fighters to Bf 109s but KG 3 suffered two damaged and one destroyed to 615 Squadron. KG 3's raid on Rochford was a success. The defences had used up their ammunition on KG 53 and all of 264 Squadron was caught and destroyed on the ground. On the last day of August, I and II./KG 3 repeated attacks on Hornchurch. 72, 151 and 310 squadrons inflicted four losses and one damaged on II. Gruppe, while I. Gruppe lost a bomber to 72 Squadron.

On 2 September one Gruppe carried out an attack covered by 50 Bf 110s from ZG 26 and JG 51. Labelled Raid 49, KG 3 split over Maidstone and small groups went on to bomb RAF Biggin Hill, Rochford, Eastchurch and RAF North Weald. 60 fighters were scrambled but only 20 made contact. 253 Squadron was unable to penetrated the fighter screen, and 72 Squadron was engaged by Bf 110s. While the RAF interceptors were busy several Do 17s carried out a low-level attack on Biggin Hill. A few bombs landed on Gravesend, wounding soldiers. 9./KG 3 lost three Dorniers—two to 72 Squadron and one to 249 Squadron.

=== The Blitz ===
On 7 September 1940 the battle over the airfields receded and the Luftwaffe turned to London, beginning the Blitz. All three groups were involved in the daylight attack on London which began the nine-month aerial bombardment of British cities. I./KG 3 had 29 aircraft (25 operational); II./KG 3 27 aircraft (23 operational); III./KG 3 could muster 28 (19 operational), on 7 September.

KG 3 lost two bombers. On 15 September KG 3 formed part of the massed attacks against London. In the afternoon the phalanx of the German bombers headed for Dungeness, before turning to London. At the head were 43 Do 17s from KG 2; next, a couple of miles behind, came 24 He 111s of KG 53; finally, a couple of miles further behind, came 19 Do 17s from KG 3; followed by 28 He 111s of KG 26. KG 3 bore the brunt of the next attack from 63 fighters from 17, 46, 249, 257, 504 and 603 Squadrons. The first pass saw three Do 17s go down, including Hauptmann Ernst Püttmann, leading 5. Staffel. The raid was costly; KG 3 lost six Dorniers destroyed and four damaged. On 24 and 30 September KG 3 suffered the respective loss on one damaged, and two damaged and one destroyed in daylight attacks. KG 3's last losses in the daylight raids occurred on 6 (one destroyed), 27 (two damaged) and 28 October (one destroyed).

On the night of 14/15 November, a large force hit Coventry. "Pathfinders" from 12 Kampfgruppe 100 led 437 bombers from KG 1, KG 3, KG 26, KG 27, KG 55 and LG 1 which dropped 394 short tons (357 t) of high explosive, 56 short tons (51 t) of incendiaries, and 127 parachute mines. Other sources say 449 bombers and a total of 530 short tons (480 t) of bombs were dropped. The raid against Coventry was particularly devastating, and led to widespread use of the phrase "to conventrate".

KG 3 was used sparingly in comparison to other German bomber units. It did take part in the Bristol Blitz on 27/28 November 1940 and the attack on Avonmouth the same night. It was also a participating force in the Birmingham Blitz (12/13 December 1940, 4/5 May 1941); the London Blitz (19/20 and 27/28 December 1940, 5, 9/10, 19/20 January 1941); Derby (15/16 January); Watton (18 January, 4 February); Wattisham (31 January); Grantham (23/24 February); Ipswich (25/26 February); Hull Blitz (1/2 March); Newcastle upon Tyne (3/4 March); Gorleston (7 March); Portsmouth Blitz (17/18 March); Chatham (24/25 May)

=== Balkan Campaign ===
In mid-March 1941 III./KG 3 staged down through France to Münchendorf, Austria and carried out training exercises from 27 to 29 March 1941. The group had 28 Dorniers, with 26 combat ready and three Junkers Ju 88s. It placed under the command of Luftflotte 4 under the command of Alexander Löhr until 5 April. The group supported the invasion of Yugoslavia, and was involved the bombing of Belgrade on 6 April. 102 Do 17s, carrying 18 SC 50 kg (110 lb) fragmentation bombs, and 2 AB 36 cluster bombs attacked the capital. Some 82 Do 17s remained operational after the first day, with only one reported loss, a KG 3 machine. Another sources states two; both from 8. Staffel. The campaign terminated on 18 April, with a swift Axis victory.

German forces also invaded Greece. The group assisted the rapid southward advance and was known to have operated over Corinth on 23 April, losing one Do 17 to anti-aircraft artillery. KG 3 specifically targeted the Corinth Canal. III./KG 3 moved to Tatoi Airport on 11 May, once the campaign on the mainland on 30 April 1941. KG 3 also played a significant part in the Battle of Crete. It supported the airborne landings throughout the third and fourth week of May. The group was based at Medidi before transferring to Tatoi. It was ordered to Goslar, Germany on 1 June to prepare for further campaigns.

=== Eastern Front ===
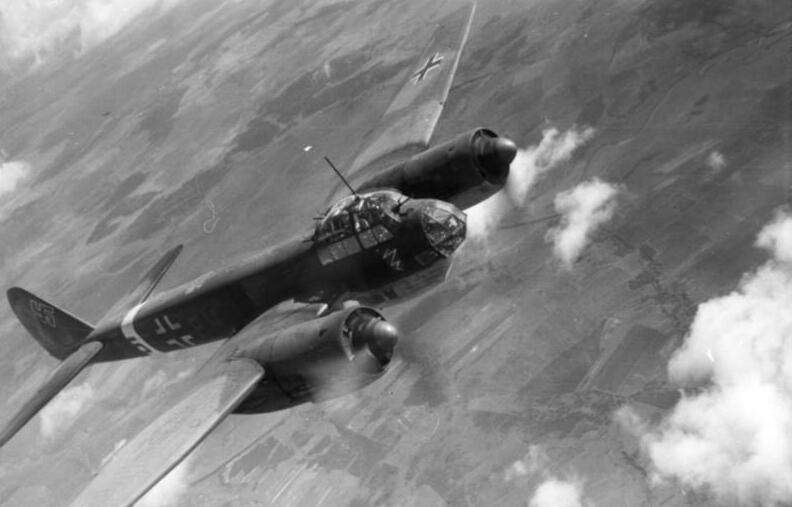
Ju 88A of KG 3 Blitz, over Russia, September–October 1942

On 22 June 1941 Operation Barbarossa began the war on the Eastern Front. Stab. and I./KG 3 was based at Dęblin–Podlokowka with three and 41 aircraft respectively. Stab./KG 3 had two Ju 88s and a single Do 17 and I./KG 3 had 32 of its 41 Ju 88s operational. Both were under II Fliegerkorps, Luftflotte 2, supporting Army Group Centre.

Dęblin–Ulez was home to II./KG 3, which fielded 32 operational Do 17s to of the 38 available. III./KG 3 moved to Suwałki, but owing to operations in the Balkans, only 18 of the 44 Do 17s were operational. Third group was placed under the command of Fliegerkorps VIII, Luftflotte 2.

On 22 June I./KG 3 attacked Pinsk airfield. The target was the Red Air Force 10th Composite Air Division. The lack of preparedness on the Soviet side allowed the Staffelkapitän, 3./KG 3, Ernst-Wilhelm Ihrig was free to make six low-level passes. He claimed to have destroyed 60 aircraft on the ground. Soviet records showed the 39th High Speed Bomber Regiment (SBAP) of the Division lost 43 Tupolev SB bombers and five Petlyakov Pe-2s. I./KG 3 assisted in the capture of Brest-Livotsk and the destruction of the city fortress, flying operations on 28 June, along with II./KG 3 which specifically targeted Brest Fortress.

II./KG 3 carried out bombing operation in the Smolensk (1 July), Bobruisk and Bryansk areas (3 July). I./KG 3 was mainly operational in the Mogilev region from 4 to 5 July. III./KG 3 attack Polotsk and Nevel on 4 July and on 5 July assisted III./KG 2 in attack Vitebsk. The raid destroyed 22 of the 183 aircraft claimed by the Luftwaffe on this date. II. fought in the Battle of Smolensk on 7 July while III./KG 3 rendered aid to Army Group Centre from 10 to 13 July. I./KG 3 bombed targets around Orsha on 19 July. All three Gruppen bombed Moscow on 22 July. On 24 July, III./KG 3, with I./KG 2, attacked the Soviet Reserve Front, with the 24th Army and 13th Army offensive in the Belyy and Yartsevo sector. The two German units claimed 40 vehicles that day. The aircraft of Luftflotte 2 destroyed 100 tanks, 1,500 motor vehicles, 41 artillery guns, 24 anti aircraft batteries between 29 July and 4 August supporting the destruction of the Smolensk encirclement.

III./KG 3 was transferred to northward to support Army Group North. It was still under the command of Fliegerkorps VIII on 3 August. It was placed under the tactical command of Stab./KG 2. based at Dedovichi, it operated over the Lake Ilmen area. It staged through to Ryebitsy, and bombed Dno on 30 August. It supported the advance of the 18th Amy and the 4th Panzer Army to Lake Ladoga and Leningrad. II./KG 3, based at Orsha from 1 August, bombed Vyazma on 8 August and Kursk on 1 September. I./KG 3, based at Orsha from 30 July, and assisted the advance on Orel on 15 September and raided Vyazma again on 16th. I./KG 3 was involved in the Battle of Kiev in September.

By 9 September 1941, KG 3 had been credited with the destruction of 450 aircraft on the ground, 21 in aerial combat, 30 tanks, 488 vehicles, 349 rail cars, seven armoured trains, 27 artillery guns and 14 bridges from 22 June. The Do 17 elements disrupted flew 290 sorties against troop concentrations, barracks, supply depots and interrupted rail traffic on 332 occasions.

In October 1941 KG 3 supported Operation Typhoon, the Battle of Moscow. In the initial attacks, KG 3, with KG 53, focused on bombing Soviet airfields. III./KG 3 operated from Vitebsk on 1 October and when the offensive began the following day, the 3rd Panzer Army and the 9th Army toward Moscow. I./KG 3 was involved in the advance in the southeast, completing operations at Tambov on 25 November before withdrawing to Germany. It bombed Moscow twice during the offensive, on 20 October and 6 November. II./KG 3 bombed Kirov on the opening day, Moscow on the 27 October and 9 November, as well as Kaluga on 21 December, weeks after the Soviet counteroffensive. II./KG 3 lingered on the front until 22 February, and between then and April 1942 left for Germany to refit and rest. III./KG 3 remained in combat with the Kalinin Front and in action over the Vyazma sector until 6 December when it too left the front to convert to the Ju 88. It handed the remaining Do 17s to the Croatian Air Force. I./KG 3 ended the year with the loss of its commander Oberstleutnant Fridtjof Pasquay who was posted missing in action on 25 November.

=== Northern, Central and Southern sector of the Eastern Front ===
Information for the period January 1942 – December 1943 is extremely sparse since much fewer of KG 3's records survive in comparison to other bomber wings. I./KG 3 operated south of Leningrad over March—June 1942. It was then moved to the central sector until June 1943. It was briefly placed under the command of Stab./KG 1 on 31 May for an undetermined amount of time. It carried out rail interdiction operations and then carried out an unusual long-range bombing operation against Kirov, Kirov Oblast on 18 June 1942. From November to 6 December 1942 it was used to help defeat the Soviet Operation Mars alongside the German 9th army.

From 7–23 July it supported the Second Panzer Army in the Orel sector. The group was on the move during this time and it recorded at Kursk on 16 July. I./KG 3 supported German forces for at least 24 hours in the Battle of Voronezh. By 20 September 1942 it had 24 Ju 88s but only 15 were combat ready. The group was moved to Münster and then Gütersloh by 26 June 1943. A specialist training busting unit—2 staffel—was possibly left at Poltava.

II./KG 3 continued to support Army Group Centre and formed part of VIII Fliegerkorps. It probably operated from Orsha 22 February 1942. In May 1942 it moved to Kharkov and was involved in the Second Battle of Kharkov and lost is commander Major Waldemar Krüger killed on 22 May. He was replaced by Günther Dörffel. 6th Staffel was trained and deployed as a train-busting unit equipped with the Ju 88C and P. The group returned to Shatalovka 26 May and then to Velikiye Luki on 14 June. It bombed Moscow on 23 July 1942 and supported the German 9th army in the Battle of Rzhev, Summer 1942. The group was assigned to support the Second Panzer Army for a time. As the Battles of Rzhev concluded, and the front in the centre stabilised, operational losses for the group stood at 70 aircrew over the spring and summer, 1943.

III./KG 3 held on to their Do 17s until May 1942 when they became the last bomber group to convert to the Ju 88 at Gütersloh. It fought near Orel and Toropets and operated in the former area from 18 to 25 May. It was involved in the Rzhev battles against the Soviet 39th Army and XI Cavalry Corps. KG 3 succeed in assisting the encirclement and destruction of the Soviet forces.

The battles cost KG 3 their Geschwaderkommodore Jobst-Heinrich von Heydebreck who was posted missing on 3 January 1943—he had only served as wing commander for two months after taking over from Heinrich Conrady on 1 November 1942. The third group supported Waffen SS and German army forces in the Third Battle of Kharkov. It moved to Bagerovo in the Crimea on 13 April 1943 and spend several weeks on attacks along the Black Sea coast until returned to Munster in June 1943. It lost two commanding officers in action over this period—Hauptmann Ernst-Wilhelm Ihrig on 30 November 1942 and his successor Siegfried Jungklaus on 22 April 1943.

Through 1943 KG 3 struck at the vital enemy rail system. By December 1942 three dedicated railway (Eisenbahn) Staffeln (squadrons) had been established and produced several expert train-busting pilots. Leutnant Udo Cordes of 9.(Eis)/KG 3, claimed 41 locomotives and 19 complete trains in three weeks while Hauptmann Ernst Fach claimed 216 locomotives on lone sorties hunting lightly defended rail lines deep into the Soviet rear. The claim count is likely to include wagons and not just locomotives. Fach's prolific run ended on 14 May 1943 when he was killed in action. Aside from one loss on 13 April in a Soviet air raid and two Ju 88s lost on 5 July 1943, little else is known about the unit.

All three groups supported Operation Citadel at Kursk. After the rapid failure of the offensive KG 3 covered the retreat. I./ KG 3 was transferred from Poltava to Kirovograd between 21 and 23 August 1943. It moved to Kalinovka by mid-October and was based at Terespol near Brest-Litovsk for retraining in night operations by 16 December. It was still there by 16 March 1944. It is known to have covered the retreats in the Belorussian SSR and bombed targets in the Smolensk area in May 1944. It was ordered to Altenburg near Leipzig on 2 June. Within four weeks all pilots had been reassigned to fighter units and the ground personnel to anti-aircraft battalions. According to the record, the dissolution was complete on 18 August. II./KG 3 was also disbanded on the same date after carrying out similar operations and moves from July 1943. Pilots and personnel were reassigned and it does not appear on Luftflotte 6's order of battle on 26 June 1944.

=== Operations against Britain ===
III./KG 3 remained the sole surviving group in late 1944. It was assigned to the 30th Jagddivision from 26 September 1943 to January 1944. It was reshaped as an illumination (pathfinder) group for single engine, none radar-equipped, night fighters engaged in the Defence of the Reich. It was renamed I.(Bel)./NJG 7 (Night Fighter Wing 7) in January 1944 and transferred from Luftflotte 6 to Luftflotte Reich.

III./KG 3 was reformed on 6 February 1944 near Lublin, Poland. It was trained to use the Heinkel He 111H-22 in night operations, as a weapon platform, for the V-1 flying bomb (FZG 76). It began this operations in late June 1944 under Fliegrkorps IX from Venlo and Gilze-Rijen in the Netherlands with nine He 111s.

On 7 and 9 July it launched V-1s at Southampton and London respectively. From 18 to 20 July it launched approximately 50 V-1s. It may have flown a last sortie on 5 October 1944, but may have been in the process of disbanding. It was subordinated to Gefechtsverband Hallensleben. It had lost four aircraft by 20 October to RAF night fighters. The groups ranks had swelled to 25 He 111s by 16 October. According to sources, from 7 July—20 October 1944 it launched around 1,100 V-1s but 40 percent failed. There is no further mention of III./KG 3 activity.

== Commanding officers ==
- Oberst Wolfgang von Chamier-Glisczinski, 1 May 1939 – 1 September 1941
- Oberst Heinrich Conrady, 1 September 1941 – 31 October 1942
- Oberst Erich Rathmann (acting), 1942
- Major Jobst-Heinrich von Heydebreck, 1 November 1942 – 3 January 1943 (MIA)
- Oberstlt Walter Lehweß-Litzmann, January 1943 – 7 September 1943 (MIA, Oberst promotion was posthumous)
- Major Fritz Auffhammer, 24 September 1943 – 18 August 1944
