= Wolfgang von Chamier-Glisczinski =

- Born: 16 April 1894; Hagen, German Empire
- Died: 22 August 1943 (aged 49) near Sisak, Independent State of Croatia
- Military career
- Allegiance: German Empire; Weimar Republic; Nazi Germany
- Branch: Luftwaffe
- Rank: Generalleutnant (Posthumously)
- Commands: Kampfgeschwader 3
- Conflicts: World War II
- Awards: Knight's Cross of the Iron Cross

Wolfgang von Chamier-Glisczinski (16 April 1894 – 22 August 1943) was a German general during World War II. He entered the Royal Prussian Army in 1913 and fought and was wounded in World War I, earning the Iron Cross, 1st and 2nd class, the Hanseatic Cross of Hamburg and the Wound Badge in silver. He was taken prisoner in France. After the war ended, he remained in the peacetime Reichswehr and transferred to the Luftwaffe in 1934. He was a recipient of the Knight's Cross of the Iron Cross of Nazi Germany. Chamier-Glisczinski died on 22 August 1943 when his airplane crashed near Sisak, Croatia. He was posthumously promoted to Generalleutnant.

== Awards and decorations ==
- Knight's Cross of the Iron Cross on 6 October 1940 as Oberst and Geschwaderkommodore of Kampfgeschwader 3

Military offices
Preceded by None	Commander of Kampfgeschwader 3 "Blitz"; 1 May 1939 – September 1941	Succeeded by Oberst Heinrich Conrady
Preceded by None	Fliegerführer Kroatien; 1 April 1943 – 26 August 1943	Succeeded by Generalleutnant Wolfgang Erdmann
