= Dno =

Town in Pskov Oblast, Russia

Dno Дно
- Town
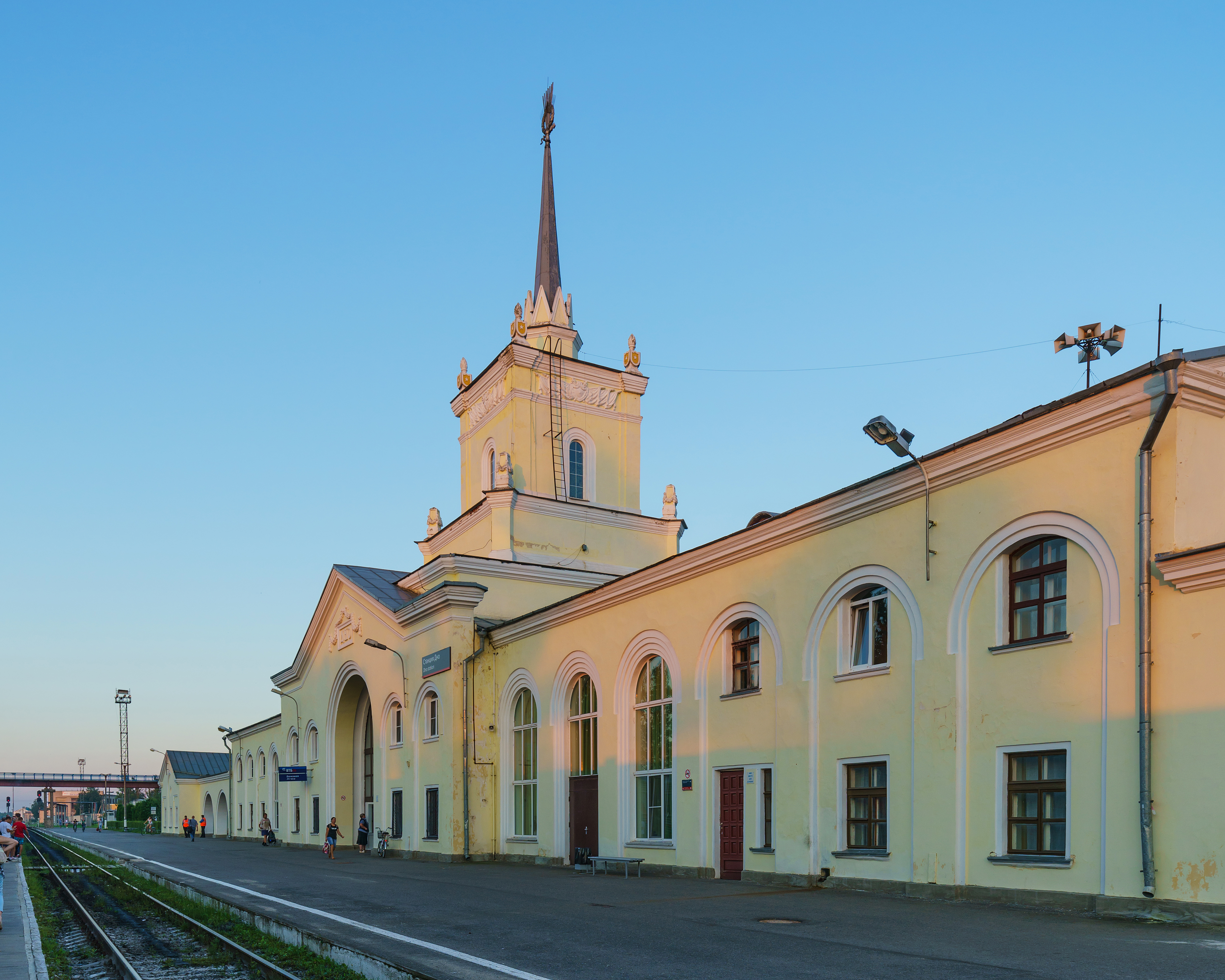
- Dno railway station

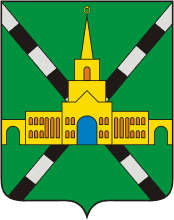
- Coat of arms
- Interactive map of Dno
- Location of Dno Dno (Pskov Oblast)
- Coordinates: 57°50′N 29°58′E
- Country: Russia
- Federal subject: Pskov Oblast
- Administrative district: Dnovsky District
- Founded: 1897
- Town status since: 1925
- Elevation: 70 m (230 ft)

Population (2010 Census)
  - Total: 9,061
  - Estimate (2021): 7,850 (−13.4%)

Administrative status
  - Capital of: Dnovsky District

Municipal status
  - Municipal district: Dnovsky Municipal District
  - Urban settlement: Dno Urban Settlement
  - Capital of: Dnovsky Municipal District, Dno Urban Settlement
- Time zone: UTC+3 (MSK)
- Postal codes: 182670, 182671
- OKTMO ID: 58612101001

Dno (Russian: Дно) is a town and the administrative center of Dnovsky District in Pskov Oblast, Russia, located at the intersection of the Pskov–Bologoye and St. Petersburg–Vitebsk railways, 113 kilometers (70 mi) east of Pskov, the administrative center of the oblast. Population: 9,061 (2010 census); 10,049 (2002 census); 12,406 (1989 Soviet census).

== History ==
Founded as a railway center in 1897, it was granted town status in 1925. The territory used to be a part of Porkhovsky Uyezd of Pskov Governorate, and Dno was the seat of Dnovskaya Volost.

On August 1, 1927, the uyezds and governorates were abolished and Dnovsky District, with the administrative center in Dno, was established as a part of Pskov Okrug of Leningrad Oblast. It included parts of former Porkhovsky Uyezd. On July 23, 1930, the okrugs were also abolished and the districts were directly subordinated to the oblast.

During World War II, Dno was under German occupation from 18 July 1941 until 24 February 1944. The Germans operated a subcamp of the Dulag 100 prisoner-of-war camp in the town.

On August 23, 1944, the district was transferred to newly established Pskov Oblast.

== Administrative and municipal status ==
Within the framework of administrative divisions, Dno serves as the administrative center of Dnovsky District, to which it is directly subordinated. As a municipal division, the town of Dno, together with three rural localities, is incorporated within Dnovsky Municipal District as Dno Urban Settlement.

== Economy ==
The town remains to a large degree economically dependent upon rail-related activities. It was home to the Dno air base prior and during World War II.

=== Industry ===
The industrial enterprises in Dno include two metalworking plants, a ceramic production plant, and a bakery.

=== Transportation ===
Dno is an important railway station where two railways cross. One connects Bologoye and Pskov via Staraya Russa and runs from east to west. Another one connects St. Petersburg and Vitebsk and runs from north to south.

Dno is connected by roads with Soltsy, with Porkhov, and with Dedovichi. There are also local roads with bus traffic.

== Culture and recreation ==
Dno contains five cultural heritage monuments of local significance. These are monuments commemorating the Revolution of 1905 and soldiers fallen in World War II.
