= Robert Krauß =

German staff officer (1894–1953)

- Born: 20 March 1894; Bayreuth, Germany
- Died: 20 February 1953 (aged 58); Lindau (Bodensee), Germany
- Military career
- Allegiance: Germany
- Branch: Infantry, Air Service
- Service years: 1914–45
- Rank: Generalmajor
- Unit: Bomber-Wing 152, Reichsluftfahrtministerium
- Commands: Greater Bomber Flying School Nr. 3
- Other work: Luftwaffe in World War II.

Robert Krauß (20 March 1894 – 20 February 1953) was a German staff officer during World War II. He was the air-base-commandant of Halberstadt from 1935 to 1936 and Kolberg from 1938 to 1939.

== Career ==
Robert Krauß was born on 20 March 1894 in Bayreuth, Bavaria, in the Kingdom of Bavaria.

As World War I broke out, Krauß entered the Army as a war volunteer with the Replacement Battalion of the 1st Bavarian Field-Artillery-Regiment (16 August 1914 – 20 October 1914).

By the time World War II began, he was an Oberstleutnant (Lieutenant Colonel). Krauß went on to serve as a Generalmajor in the Luftwaffe during World War II. He was an officer with special duties of the RLM and C-in-C Luftwaffe (1 November 1939 – 28 February 1940) and group-leader in the Regulations-Department, RLM (1 March 1940 – 30 September 1940). From 1 October 1940 to 30 April 1941, he was the commander of the Greater Bomber Flying School 3 in Warsaw and air-base-commandant Warsaw.

He was released from captivity in June 1947 and died in Lindau, Germany on 20 February 1953.

== Bibliography ==
- John Weal: He 111 Kampfgeschwader in the West (Combat Aircraft). Osprey Publishing, 2012, p. 89, ISBN 978-1-84908-670-7.
