= Dno (air base) =

- IATA: none; ICAO: XLOD

Summary
- Airport type: Military
- Operator: Soviet Air Force; Luftwaffe
- Location: Dno, Pskov Oblast, Russia
- Elevation AMSL: 253 ft / 77 m
- Coordinates: 57°47′0″N 029°58′0″E
- Interactive map of Dno

Runways
Direction	Length		Surface
Direction	ft	m	Surface
	9,514	2,900

Dno (Russian: аэродром Дно), also known as Grivochki (Гривочки), was a military air base in Dnovsky District, Pskov Oblast, Russia. It was located 4 kilometres (2.5 mi) south of Dno, approximately 113 kilometers (70 mi) east of Pskov, and 133 km (83 mi) of the Estonian border.

Dno air base was established by the Soviet Union prior to World War II, to serve the Red Army Air Force, with the Air Forces of the 7th Army (made up principally of the 54th and 59th Fighter Aviation Brigades) operating from there during the Winter War from 1939 to 1940.

In 1941, Dno was captured by Nazi Germany during Operation Barbarossa and given the German name Flugplatz Griwotschki (Grivochki Airfield). It was renovated and expanded for use by the Luftwaffe. On March 15, 1943, the air base was raided by the Soviet 202nd High-speed Bomber Aviation Regiment, reportedly destroying 20 German planes and permanently crippling German air activity in the area. In 1944, Grivochki was destroyed by retreating Wehrmacht troops and was never rebuilt, and today nothing remains of the complex except a clearing.
