= Wolfgang Schenck =

Wolfgang Schenck may refer to:

- Wolfgang Schenck (pilot) (1913–2010), German pilot
- Wolfgang Schenck (actor), German actor, starring in Effi Briest
