= Bălți Aerodrome =

Defunct airport in Bălți, Moldova

Bălți Aerodrome Aerodromul Bălți
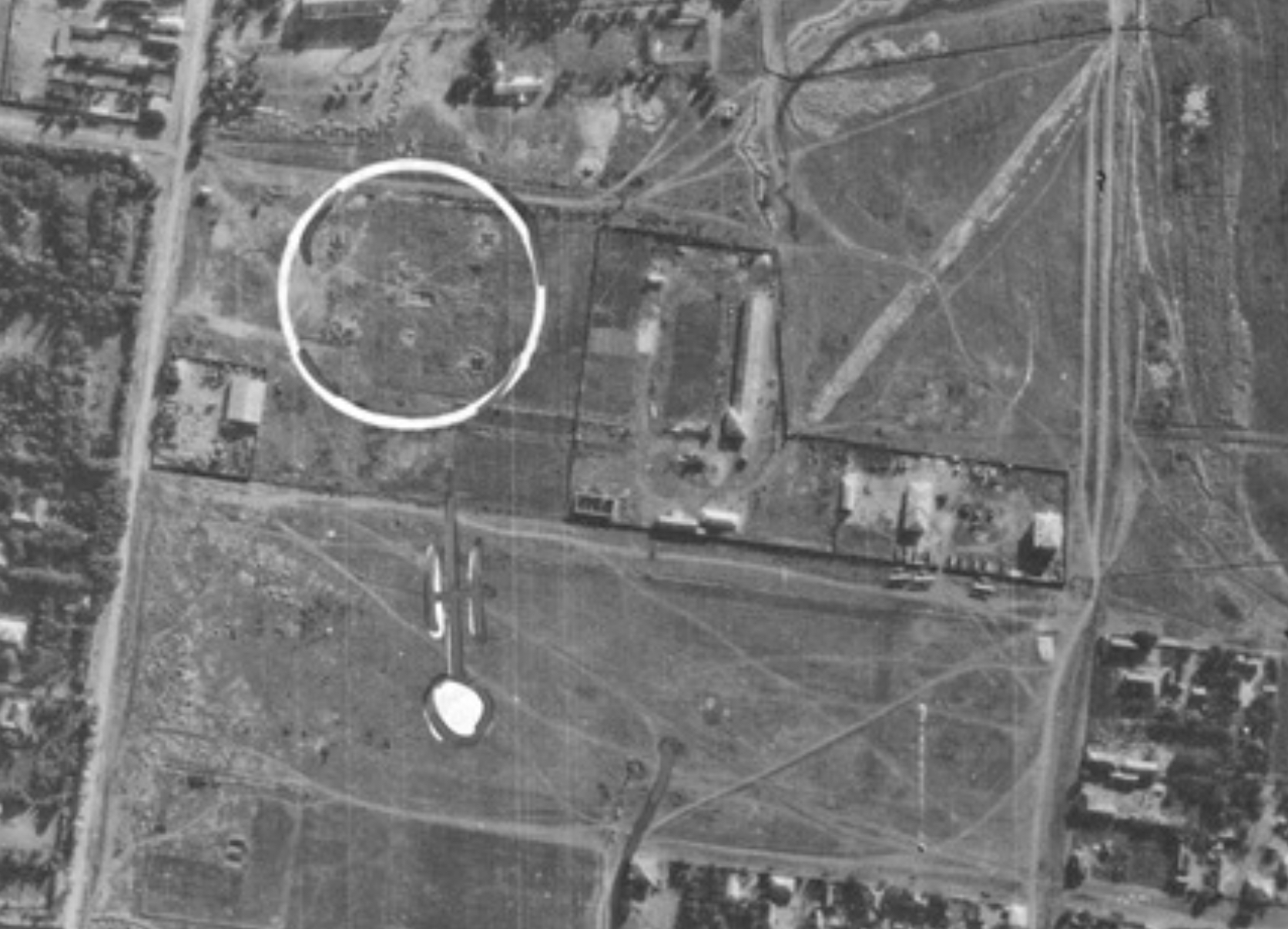
- Bălți Aerodrome (1944)
- IATA: none; ICAO: none

Summary
- Airport type: Public (interwar period) / Military (until 1944)
- Operator: CFRNA; LARES; Luftwaffe; 55th Fighter Aviation Regiment (IAP-55); Jagdgeschwader 77; Kampfgeschwader 27; Kampfgeschwader 51; White Squadron
- Serves: Bălți
- Location: Sportului Street, Teioasa, Bălți, Moldova
- Closed: 1944
- Coordinates: 47°45′02″N 27°54′38″E

Map
- Location in Moldova

Bălți Aerodrome (Romanian: Aerodromul Bălți, Russian: Аэродром Бельцы), also known as Bălți-Teioasa Aerodrome, was the first civil airfield in the city of Bălți, then part of the Kingdom of Romania. It operated during the interwar period as a civil aerodrome. It was located in what was then the western district of the city of Bălți, known as Teioasa.

During World War II, the site was repurposed as a Soviet auxiliary military airfield in the Moldavian SSR.
