= 1961 F-84 Thunderstreak incident =

Cold war incident

F-84 Thunderstreak incident
- Part of the Cold War
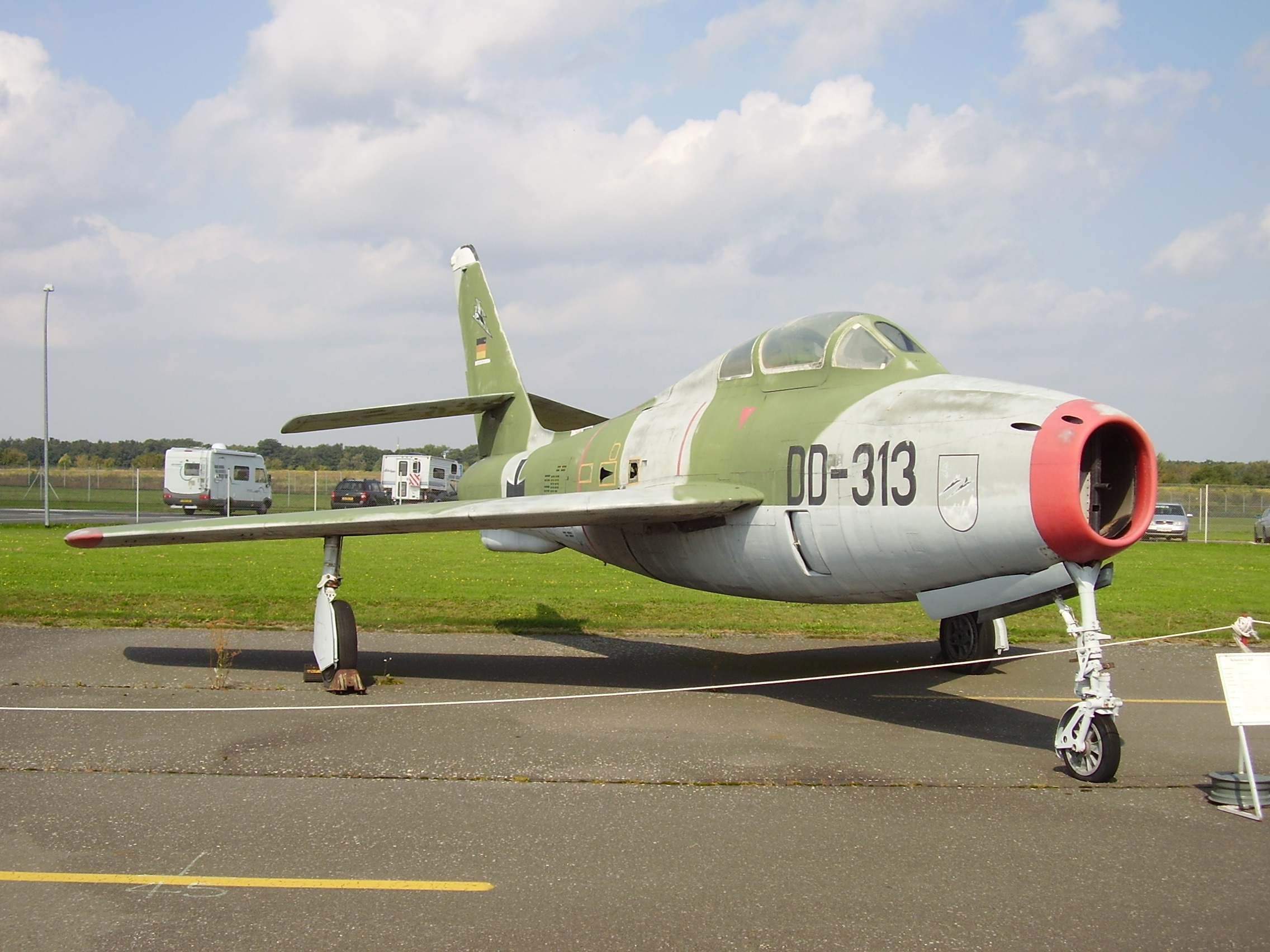
- An F-84 Thunderstreak of the German Air Force (Luftwaffe)
Date	14 September 1961
Location	Near Leipzig, East Germany
Result	West German fighters landed safely

Belligerents
West Germany	Soviet Union

Commanders and leaders
Siegfried Barth	Ivan Konev

Units involved
JaBoG 32	Western Group of Forces

The 1961 F-84 Thunderstreak incident, occurring on 14 September 1961, was an incident during the Cold War, in which two Republic F-84F Thunderstreak fighter-bombers of JaBoG 32 of the German Air Force (Luftwaffe) crossed into East German airspace because of a navigational error, before landing at Berlin Tegel Airport. The two planes successfully evaded a large number of Soviet fighter planes by finding cover in a heavy layer of clouds, but also by the actions of an airman at the United States Air Force (USAF) air route traffic control center at Berlin Tempelhof Airport who ordered the planes on to Berlin rather than forcing them to turn around and face the pursuing fighter planes. The event came at a historically difficult time in relations between West Germany and East Germany. Only a month before, the Berlin Wall had been built, which completely cut off West Berlin from surrounding East Germany and from East Berlin. It also came three days before the West German federal election, held on 17 September 1961.

== Background ==
At the time, violations of airspace at the border between West and East Germany were common, with, on average, two aircraft a month belonging to members of the North Atlantic Treaty Organization (NATO) crossing into Eastern airspace while a much larger number of Soviet planes crossed into that of West Germany. There were 38 violations of West Germany's air space by Soviet aircraft in a period of just four weeks between August and September 1961. Some of the violations were deliberate, to determine the opposite side's reaction, while others were by mistake, caused by the difficulty in determining the border line from the air.

Between the end of the Second World War and the German reunification, West German planes were not permitted to fly to West Berlin, regardless of whether they were civilian or military aircraft. The three existing air corridors to the city were only open to planes from the three wartime Western Allies: the United States, France and the United Kingdom.

== Incident ==
On 14 September 1961, under the code name Checkmate, the NATO high command mobilised the air forces of France, Belgium, the Netherlands, Denmark, and West Germany for the purpose of an exercise. As part of this exercise, the Jagdbombers of Jagdbombergeschwader (JaBoG) 32, based at Lechfeld Air Base, south of Augsburg, were to fly a triangular route from Würzburg to Laon and then to Memmingen.

Two F-84 fighter-bombers, flown by Feldwebel Peter Pfefferkorn and Stabsunteroffizier Hans Eberl, lost their course in the process of flying this route, with the compass on Pfefferkorn's plane misreading by between 40 and 60 degrees. Additionally, a strong westerly wind was greater in strength than had been forecasted. On their way from Würzburg to Laon, the two pilots had become so disoriented that they mistook Liège in Belgium for Reims in France.

Shortly after, the pair were picked up by NATO radar stations near Warburg, in southern Westphalia, heading east, in the direction of Königs Wusterhausen, south of Berlin. The two pilots missed a radio call from the radar stations advising them to turn around because they were talking to each other, trying to establish their location.

It was only when reaching a position north of Leipzig, deep within East German air space, that Pfefferkorn sent a Mayday signal, which was picked up, to their surprise, by the French-controlled airport at Tegel in West Berlin, which gave them permission to land. The planes had initially not been noticed by the radar operator at the Berlin Tempelhof Airport because he was concentrating on an incoming Pan Am Douglas DC-6. By the time they were noticed, the pair were being unsuccessfully chased by a large number of Soviet fighter aircraft. An airman in the Berlin Air Route Traffic Control Center ordered the two pilots not to turn around and face the pursuing fighter planes but instead to head for the Tegel airport as it had a longer runway than Tempelhof and was more suitable for jets. Because of the actions of this airman and the heavy cloud cover, which the two pilots used to conceal themselves, Pfefferkorn and Eberl escaped the pursuing Soviet aircraft and successfully landed their planes without further incident at Tegel.

== Reaction ==
=== International ===
Immediately after the two aircraft landed, the French authorities at Tegel airport explained to the Soviet authorities in East Berlin that, because of technical difficulties, an emergency landing of the two planes had been absolutely necessary.

The then-West German Minister of Defence, Franz-Josef Strauß, apologised to the Soviet ambassador in Bonn for the incident, sending his secretary of state, Volkmar Hopf. The government of the Soviet Union remained silent for a number of days with regards to the incident, before officially protesting against the West German "provocation" and threatening to shoot down any aircraft involved if the incident was repeated.

The Soviet air command in East Germany was less than impressed with the 'unpunished' flight of two Western fighter planes through their airspace. However, it chose to blame bad weather for the incident rather than the failure of its ground control to guide the Soviet fighter planes on to the West German ones.

=== Domestic ===
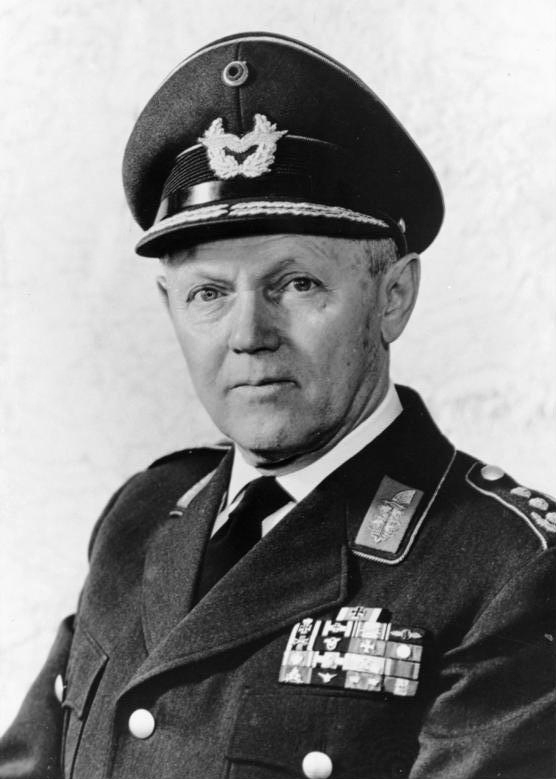
Josef Kammhuber

Willy Brandt, the leader of the opposition Social Democratic Party in the upcoming federal elections, and the mayor of West Berlin, questioned how the two pilots could be put in a situation where they would be forced to violate international conventions in a time of strained relations between the East and the West. Initially, Strauß announced a stringent investigation into the incident; instead, however, he and Josef Kammhuber, Inspector of the Air Force, transferred the commander of JaBoG 32, Oberstleutnant Siegfried Barth, and announced that any commander whose unit committed a violation of international borders would be immediately replaced.

When Kammhuber announced this order at Lechfeld the following day, it was dubbed Bier Order 61 (Beer Order 61) because it was formulated late at night over drinks between Kammhuber and Strauß. Barth, commander of JaBoG 32, was not questioned with regard to the incident, and was not allowed to speak during Kammhuber's visit. Instead, Generalleutnant Martin Harlinghausen, Barth's superior officer, who had once, in 1944, stood up to Hermann Göring, spoke for Barth and demanded a proper investigation.

Two weeks later, Harlinghausen was forced into early retirement. The non-commissioned officers of JaBoG 32 sent a letter to Strauß requesting that Barth should retain his command, without receiving any answer. Eventually, a proper investigation was conducted which found Barth to be innocent, a result unacceptable to Kammhuber, who initiated a second investigation that found the Oberstleutnant partly at fault. A third investigation followed, which again found Barth to be innocent. Oberstleutnant Barth then lodged an official complaint against Franz-Josef Strauß. Strauß, as minister of defence, ordered all witnesses in the case – Generals Kammhuber, Harlinghausen, Werner Panitzki and Werner Streib as well as Lieutenant Colonels Walter Krupinski and Walter Grasemann – not to speak, as they were all military personnel and therefore under his command. Nevertheless, his conduct in dismissing Barth was found to be at fault, and the latter had to be reinstated in his position. Strauß, however, ignored this decision until Hellmuth Heye, Ombudsman for the Military, forced him to accept it. Strauß himself was later forced to resign from his post as Minister of Defence, in the wake of the Spiegel scandal in 1962. Kammhuber retired from his post in the same year.

== Aftermath ==
Upon arrival at Tegel, the two planes were immediately hidden in hangars and journalists were prohibited from taking pictures of them. For years after, it was believed that the two planes had been repainted as aircraft of the United States Air Force and returned to West Germany by USAF pilots, or that they had been disassembled and transported back to the West in pieces. The arrival of two massive Douglas C-124 at Tegel from Frankfurt am Main also fuelled speculations that the two F-84s would be transported back in these aircraft. Another theory (which turned out to be true) held that the two aircraft were hidden by the French authorities at Tegel and, later, buried at the airfield, where they were accidentally rediscovered in the 1970s.

In an exhibition at the Luftwaffenmuseum Berlin-Gatow in 2006, pictures of the two buried and then rediscovered Thunderstreaks at Tegel were shown, finally clearing up the question of what became of the two planes.

The pilots of the two Thunderstreaks, Pfefferkorn and Eberl, were banned from flying and transferred to the ground crew at Lechfeld. The F-84F Thunderstreak, in service with the Jagdbombergeschwader 32 since inception of the unit on 22 July 1958, was phased out of service on 13 July 1966, the Geschwader having accumulated over 80,000 flight hours with the planes.

=== 1962 incident ===
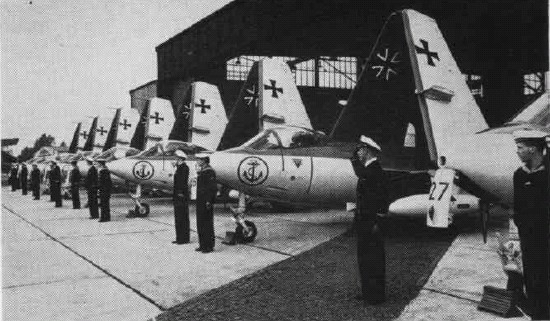
Marineflieger-Geschwader 1

Eleven months after the F-84 incident, the Soviet threat to shoot down any aircraft violating the border materialized when a Hawker Sea Hawk of the Bundesmarine, piloted by Kapitänleutnant Knut Anton Winkler, was shot at by MiG-21 fighters when it accidentally crossed into East German airspace near Eisenach. Winkler, who had been returning from a training exercise on board U.S. Navy aircraft carrier USS Saratoga in the Atlantic Ocean, had to carry out an emergency landing at Ahlhorn, 45 km southwest of Bremen. The aircraft was eventually written-off. Winkler himself died less than four years later in an F-104 Starfighter accident on 10 May 1966.

== See also ==
- Berlin Crisis of 1961
- 1964 T-39 shootdown incident
