= RAF Wanborough =

RAF Wanborough
- Swindon, Wiltshire in England

Site information
- Owner: Air Ministry
- Operator: Royal Air Force
- Controlled by: RAF Flying Training Command

Location
- Shown within Wiltshire
- Coordinates: 51°32′11″N 1°40′57″W

Site history
- Built: 1941
- In use: 1941-1946
- Battles/wars: Second World War

Royal Air Force Wanborough or more simply RAF Wanborough is a former Royal Air Force satellite airfield near Swindon, Wiltshire, England.

The following units were here at some point:

- No. 3 Elementary Flying Training School RAF
- No. 3 Glider Training School RAF
- No. 3 Service Flying Training School RAF
- No. 14 Service Flying Training School RAF
- No. 1547 (Beam Approach Training) Flight RAF
- Airfield Controllers School
- School of Flying Control

== Current use ==
The site is now open land.
