= No. 3 Flying Training School RAF =

Flying Training School of the Royal Air Force

No. 3 Flying Training School
- School badge
- Active: 1920–1922; 1928–1939; 1939–1942; 1945–1947; 1947–1958; 1961–1966; 1966–1984; 1989–present
- Country: United Kingdom
- Branch: Royal Air Force
- Type: Flying training school
- Role: Elementary flying training and multi-engine pilot training
- Part of: Directorate of Flying Training
- Headquarters: RAF Cranwell
- Motto: Achieve
- Aircraft: Embraer Phenom T1; Grob Tutor T1; Grob Prefect T1

No. 3 Flying Training School is a Royal Air Force military training school, which manages elementary flying training for the Royal Navy and Royal Air Force and also for the training of all non-pilot aircrew for the RAF and is home to the Central Flying School Tutor Squadron.

Although the school is nominally based at RAFC Cranwell, only the multi-engine pilots and students on 57 Squadron fly from this aerodrome, with the Navy elements based at the nearby RAF Barkston Heath and the remaining trainee pilots based at RAF Wittering.

== History ==
=== First formation ===
No 3 FTS was first formed at Scopwick (later renamed RAF Digby) on 26 April 1920 from No. 59 Training Squadron in No. 3 Group. That month Squadron Leader Arthur Harris, later AOC-in-C Bomber Command, was jointly appointed both station and school commander. It was transferred to No. 1 Group on 31 August 1921 but disbanded on 1 April 1922.

The school reformed at RAF Spitalgate near Grantham on 1 April 1928, equipped with Avro 504Ns and Armstrong Whitworth Siskins, which were later replaced by Avro Tutors, Armstrong Whitworth Atlases and Hawker Harts.

=== Second formation ===
On 16 August 1937 the school relocated to RAF South Cerney, becoming No. 3 Service Flying Training School on 3 September 1939, where it remained until being redesignated No. 3 (Pilots) Advanced Flying Unit on 1 March 1942. By the outbreak of war the school was operating Harts and Airspeed Oxfords but on 24 June 1940 it became a No. 2 Group school, specialising on twin engined training using Oxfords. During this part of its life, the school used a number of relief landing grounds including RAF Stormy Down, RAF Bibury, RAF Long Newnton and RAF Wanborough. With the end of the war No. 3 (P) AFU was redesignated No. 3 SFTS again on 17 December 1945 and was now equipped with North American Harvards. On 24 April 1946 the school moved to RAF Feltwell and on 9 April 1947, its title reverted to No. 3 FTS and continued to operate from here until 31 May 1958 by which time it was using the Percival Provost T.1.

=== Third and Fourth formations ===
It entered the jet age when it was reformed at RAF Leeming on 15 September 1961, equipped with the Hunting Aircraft Jet Provost T.3. In 1966 it took over the Vampire Advanced Training Unit from No. 7 FTS and in December of the same year became No. 3 (Basic) FTS. 1971 saw control transfer from No. 22 to No. 23 Group and in December 1973 it took over the School of Refresher Flying from RAF Manby. In November 1974 it took over another unit when the RN Elementary Flying Training School arrived from RAF Church Fenton, but with the reduction in the demand for pilots and the RAF cut back, the school was disbanded at Leeming on 26 April 1984.

=== Fifth formation ===
The school's current incarnation began on 1 February 1989 when it became part of RAF Cranwell by redesignating the flying element of the Royal Air Force College and undertook the basic flying training of some graduates from Initial Officer Training at the co-located RAF College Cranwell, other graduates going to RAF Linton-on-Ouse. Shorts Tucanos began arriving from January 1991 with the last flight of the Jet Provost on 29 October 1991. In 1992 the school took over the CFS Bulldog element, which was later replaced by the CFS Tutor element. Also in 1995 the Hawker Siddeley Dominie T.1s and British Aerospace Jetstream T.1s (No. 45 (Reserve) Squadron) of 6 FTS were taken over on the closure of RAF Finningley, with the Dominie element becoming No 55 (Reserve) Squadron on 1 November 1996. The Short Tucano was withdrawn from 3 FTS on 31 March 1995. The Dominie was withdrawn from service when WSO and WSOp training ended on 20 January 2011. Crew training is now carried out in King Airs.

== Current units ==
Squadrons forming part of 3 FTS:

- RAF Cranwell
  - 45 Squadron
  - 57 Squadron
  - 703 Naval Air Squadron
- RAF Wittering
  - 16 Squadron

Due to its proximity to, and because of, the busier circuit at RAF Cranwell, elementary flying training units use RAF Barkston Heath for a significant amount of their operations.

674 Squadron AAC formed the Army Air Corps contingent of 3 FTS up until its standing down in April 2021.
