= 12th Air Corps =

XII. Fliegerkorps German 12th Air Corps
- Flag of a commanding general of a Fliegerkorps
- Active: 1 August 1941 – 15 September 1943
- Country: Nazi Germany
- Branch: Luftwaffe
- Size: Corps

Commanders
- Notable commanders: Josef Kammhuber

12th Air Corps (XII. Fliegerkorps) was formed 1 August 1941 in Zeist from the Stab of the 1. Nachtjagd-Division and was redesignated as I. Jagdkorps on 15 September 1943. The unit was subordinated to Luftwaffenbefehlshaber Mitte.

== Commanding officers ==
- General Josef Kammhuber, 9 August 1941 – 15 September 1943

== See also ==
- Luftwaffe Organization
