= Lechfeld Air Base =

Lechfeld Air Base Fliegerhorst Lechfeld Advanced Landing Ground R-71

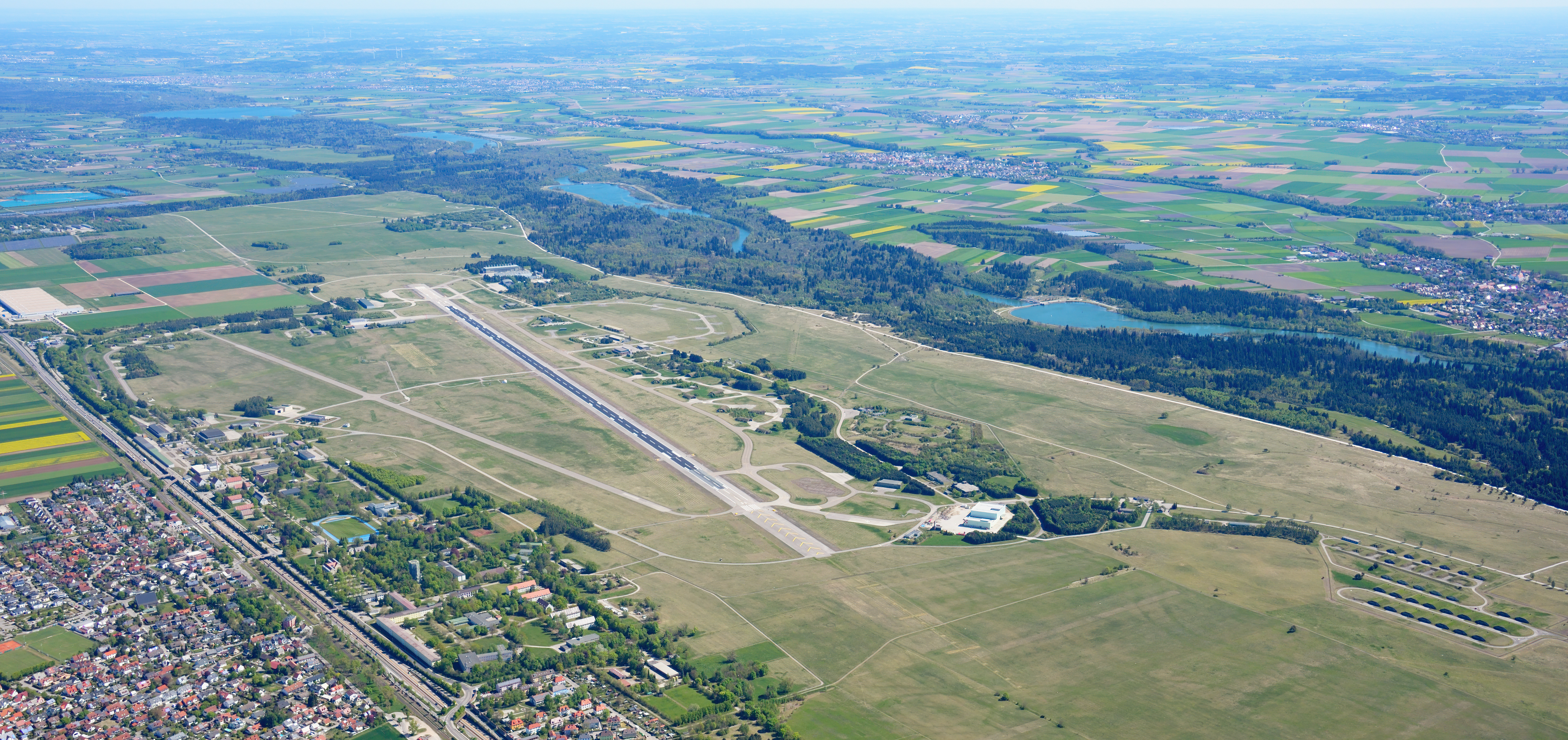
- IATA: none; ICAO: ETSL

Summary
- Airport type: Military
- Owner: Unified Armed Forces of the Federal Republic of Germany
- Operator: German Air Force
- Location: Lagerlechfeld, Germany
- Elevation AMSL: 1,822 ft (555 m)
- Coordinates: 48°11′10″N 010°51′42″E

Map
- Location of Lechfeld Air Base

Runways
| Direction | Length | | Surface |
| Direction | m | ft | Surface |
|---|---|---|---|
| 03/21 | 2,442 | 8,012 | Asphalt |

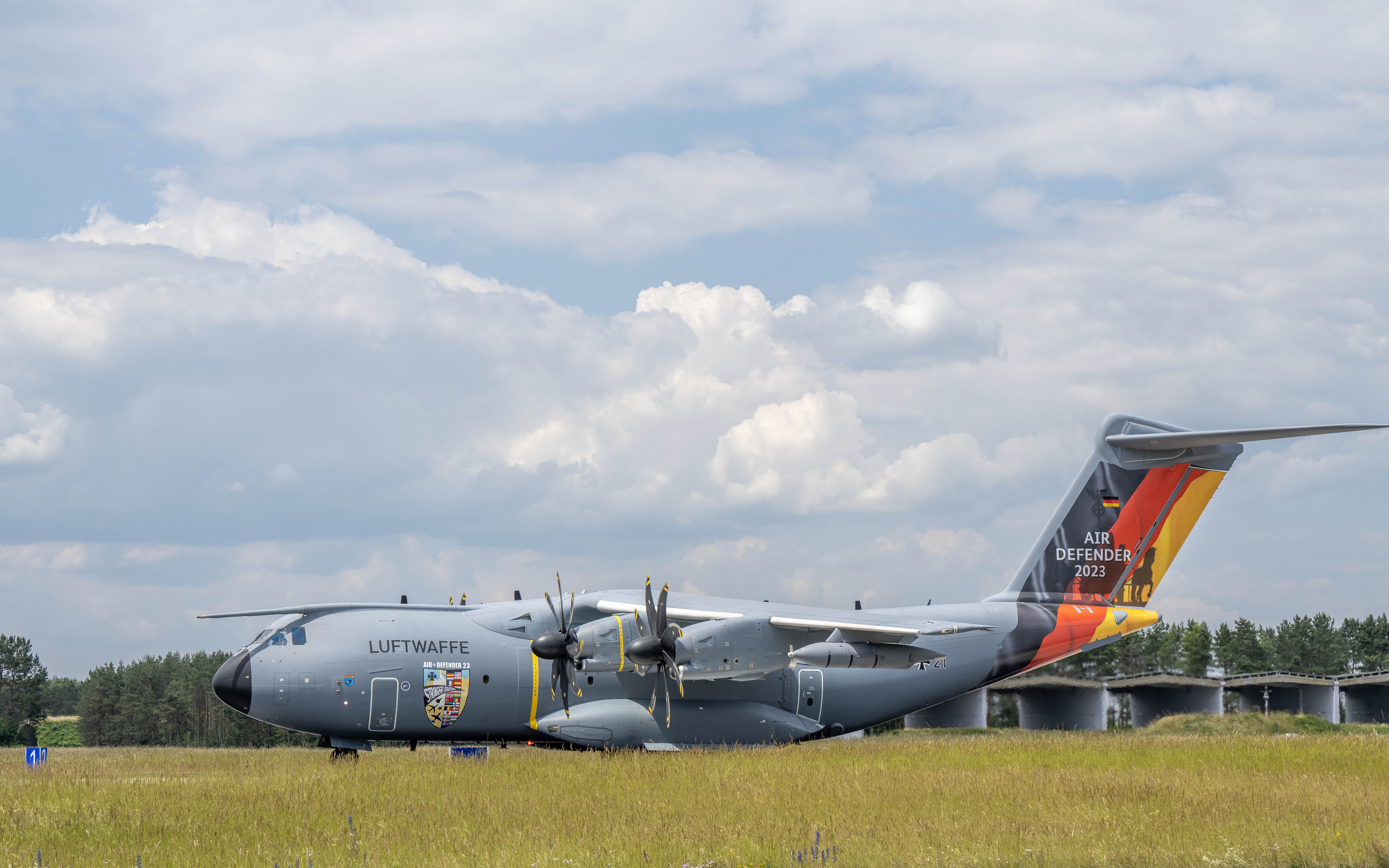
A Luftwaffe Airbus A400M Atlas at Lechfeld Air Base

Lechfeld Air Base (ICAO: ETSL) is a German Air Force (Luftwaffe) base located 1 km east of Lagerlechfeld in Bavaria, about 20 km south of Augsburg on the Bundestrasse 17.

It was the home of Training Division A of the School of Management Assistance, and of 32 Fighter Bomber Wing (Jagdbombergeschwader 32), part of the Luftwaffe's 1st Air Division. The two squadrons based there flew the Panavia Tornado until 2013. There was a plan to use Lechfeld as Germany's second base for the Airbus A400M Atlas transport aircraft.

== History ==
In 1912, the German Army's military flight operations started at Lechfeld, but were forbidden after the First World War. Flight operations were resumed in 1934 and a flight school was opened. The Messerschmitt Works at Augsburg used Lagerlechfeld also as a test airfield. On May 22, 1943, at Lechfeld, Adolf Galland made his first flight in the Messerschmitt Me 262, a highly advanced twin engine jet fighter. He told Hermann Göring, "It felt as if angels were pushing." In April 1944 a special Luftwaffe service test unit began training of operational pilots on the Me 262A. Most of the buildings were destroyed by 1945 after several air attacks.

=== American use ===
American Army units moved into the Lagerlechfeld area in early May 1945 during the Western Allied invasion of Germany and seized the airfield with little or no opposition. Initial reconstruction plans for the base to be used as a United States Army Air Forces field were cancelled after the German Capitulation on 7 May, and the facility was garrisoned by United States Army units, although United States Army Air Forces personnel were sent to the base to evaluate the Messerschmitt aircraft left at the airfield. It was designated as Advanced Landing Ground "R-71"

In December 1945, the facility was turned over to the United States Army Air Forces, which renamed it Army Air Force Station Lechfeld and was used by various units as an occupation garrison until being closed on 1 Jun 1947, being put into "standby" status and turned over to the Army garrison at Augsburg for control.

=== Modern era ===
The unreconstructed facility was eventually turned over to the reconstituted German Armed Forces in 1955, and the first German military personnel of the newly created Bundeswehr arrived at the Lechfeld on 7 July 1956. Their task was to rebuild the air base that had been damaged in the Second World War. Two years later, on 22 July 1958, 32 Fighter Bomber Wing began flight operations using F-84 Thunderstreak aircraft.

On 14 September 1961, two F-84F Thunderstreak of 32 Fighter Bomber Wing crossed into East German airspace due to a navigational error, eventually landing at Berlin Tegel Airport, evading a large number of Soviet fighter planes. The event came at a historically difficult time during the Cold War, one month after the construction of the Berlin Wall. Oberstleutnant Siegfried Barth, commander of the unit at the time, was transferred for the incident but later, after a number of investigations and complaints, had to be reinstated.

In 1965 32 Fighter Bomber Wing received the F-104 Starfighter until they were replaced between 1982 and 1984 by the Panavia Tornado.

Lechfeld Air Base was used for several Cold War NATO deployments of USAF and Air National Guard units during the annual "Reforger" exercises.

In October 2011 the German Federal Ministry of Defence announced a reorganisation/reduction of the German Armed Forces. As a consequence, 32 Fighter Bomber Wing will be disbanded and 14 Student Company of the German Armed Forces Command Support School, also stationed at the air base, will be reduced to one of the elements of the German Armed Forces Command Support School. The base will house a branch of the German Air Force Engineering Training Centre and other minor units of the air force. The reorganisation will reduce the number of personnel stationed on the air base from currently 1620 to 570. The disbandment of 32 Fighter Bomber Wing took place on 31 March 2013.

In 2019, it was announced that Lechfeld would become the second base for the Airbus A400M Atlas transport aircraft. In addition to the main base Wunstorf, 13 aircraft of this type are to fly here from 2025.

On the airfield it is a part of the major maneuver from June 12 to June 23, 2023, held under the leadership of the German Air Force Air Defender 23 it is the greatest exercise of air forces since NATO was announced.
