= Josef Kammhuber =

German general

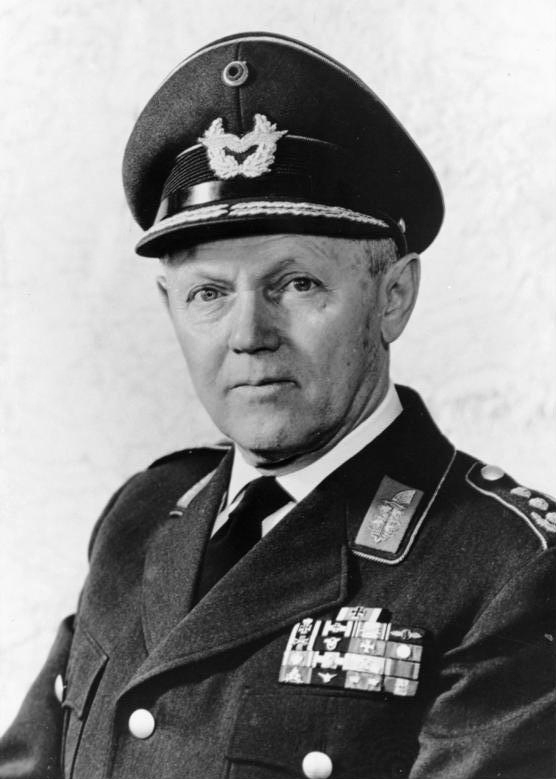
- Josef Kammhuber as Inspector of the West German Air Force
- Born: 19 August 1896; Tüßling, Kingdom of Bavaria, German Empire
- Died: 25 January 1986 (aged 89); Munich, West Germany
- Burial place: Westfriedhof (Munich)
- Military career
- Allegiance: German Empire; Weimar Republic; Nazi Germany; West Germany
- Branch: Luftwaffe; German Air Force (Luftwaffe)
- Service years: 1914–1945; 1955–1962
- Rank: General
- Conflicts: World War I; World War II
- Awards: Knight's Cross of the Iron Cross

Josef Kammhuber (August 19, 1896 – January 25, 1986) was a career officer who served in the Imperial German Army, the Luftwaffe of Nazi Germany and the post-World War II German Air Force. During World War II, he was the first general of night fighters in the Luftwaffe.

Kammhuber created the night fighter defense system, the so-called Kammhuber Line, but the detailed knowledge of the system provided to the Royal Air Force by British military intelligence allowed them to render it ineffective. Personal battles between him and Erhard Milch, director of the Reich Air Ministry, led to his dismissal in 1943. After the war, he joined the Bundeswehr, the armed forces of West Germany serving as the first Inspector of the Air Force.

== Career ==
Josef Kammhuber was born in Tüßling, Bavaria, the son of a farmer. At the outbreak of World War I Kammhuber was 18 and joined a Bavarian engineer battalion. He participated in the Battle of Verdun in 1916 and was promoted to Second Lieutenant in 1917. He remained in Germany's post-war army, and in 1925 was promoted to First Lieutenant. Between October 1926 and September 1928, he received division-level leadership training. From 1 May to 30 September 1930, he was sent to the USSR for pilot training at the Lipetsk fighter-pilot school. On his return, Kammhuber joined the staff of General Walter Wever, chief of staff of the Luftwaffe prior to World War II.

Kammhuber returned to active duty in February 1939 and was assigned as chief-of-staff of Luftflotte 2. On January 11, 1940, he was reprimanded by Adolf Hitler personally because of the Mechelen Incident. He was then transferred to the Western Front where he became commander of KG 51. On 3 June 1940, he flew with the wing (possibly on Operation Paula). He was shot down and briefly became a prisoner of war. Kammhuber was released upon the Armistice of 22 June 1940. In July 1940 he was placed in command of coordinating flak, searchlight and radar units at Luftwaffe's General Staff. The result was the XII. Fliegerkorps (12th Air Corps), a new dedicated night-fighting command, created on 1 August 1940. He reached the rank of Generalleutnant by October 1941 and General der Flieger on 1 January 1943.

=== Defence of the Reich ===
Kammhuber organised the night fighting units into a chain known to the British as the Kammhuber Line, a series of radar stations with overlapping coverage. The stations were layered three deep from Denmark to the middle of France, each covering a zone about 32 km (20 mi) long (north-south) and 20 km (12 mi) wide (east-west). Each control centre was known as a Himmelbett (four-poster bed) zone, consisting of a Freya radar with a range of about 100 km (62 mi), a number of searchlights spread through the cell, and one primary and one backup night fighter assigned to the cell. Royal Air Force (RAF) bombers flying into Germany or France would have to cross the line at some point and the radar would direct a searchlight to illuminate the aircraft. Once this had happened, other manually controlled searchlights would also pick up the aeroplane and the night fighter would be directed to intercept the illuminated bomber. Demands by Bürgermeisters in Germany led to the recall of the searchlights to the major cities.

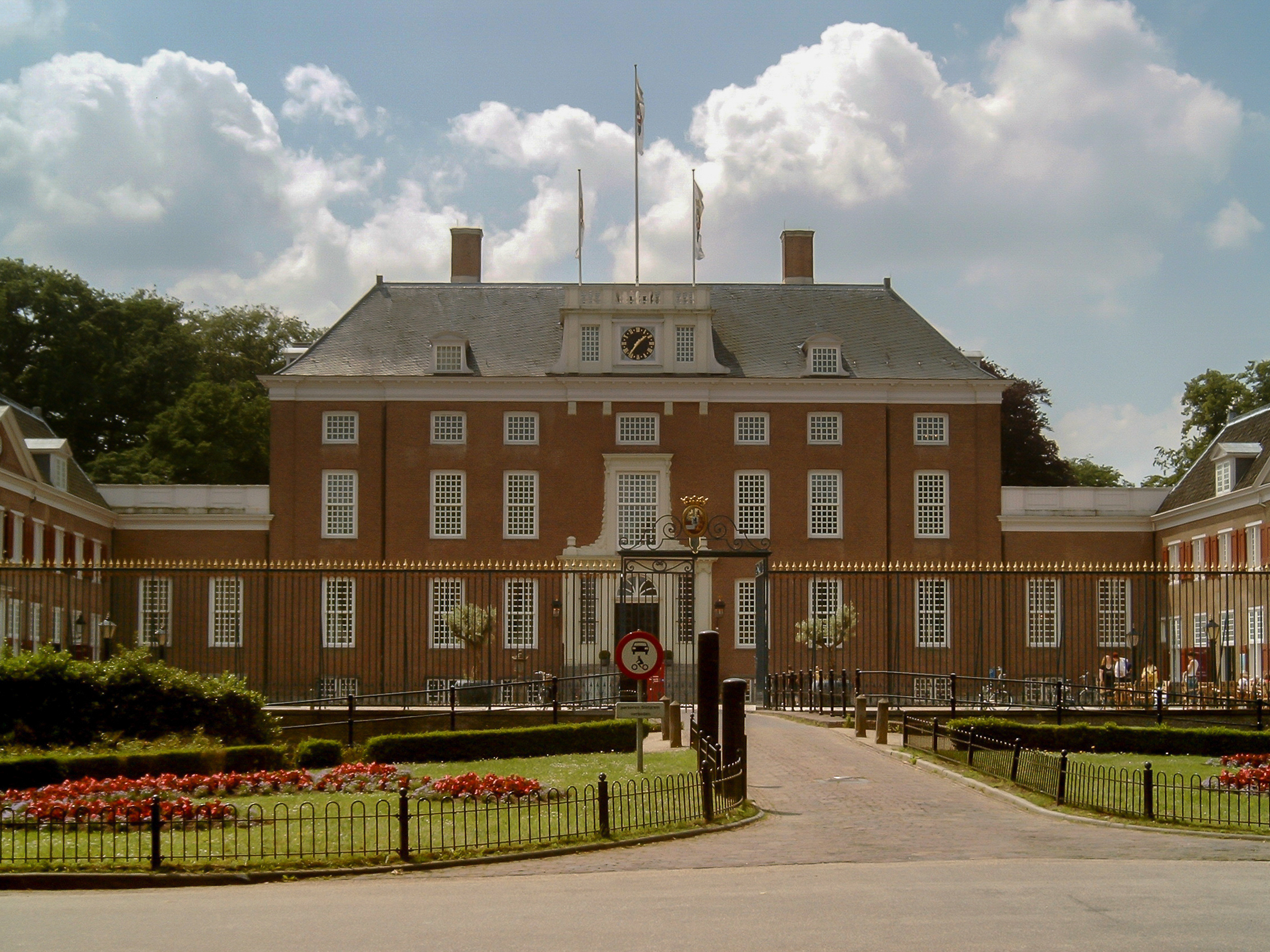
Slot Zeist, Kammhubers headquarters.

Later versions of the Himmelbett added two Würzburg radars, with a range of about 30 km (19 mi). Unlike the early-warning Freya radar, Würzburgs were accurate (and complex) tracking radars. One would be locked onto the night fighter as soon as it entered the cell. After the Freya picked up a target the second Würzburg would lock onto it, thereby allowing controllers in the Himmelbett center to get continual readings on the positions of both aircraft, controlling them to a visual interception. To aid in this, a number of the night fighters were fitted with a short-range infrared device known as 'Spanner anlage' but these proved almost useless in practice.

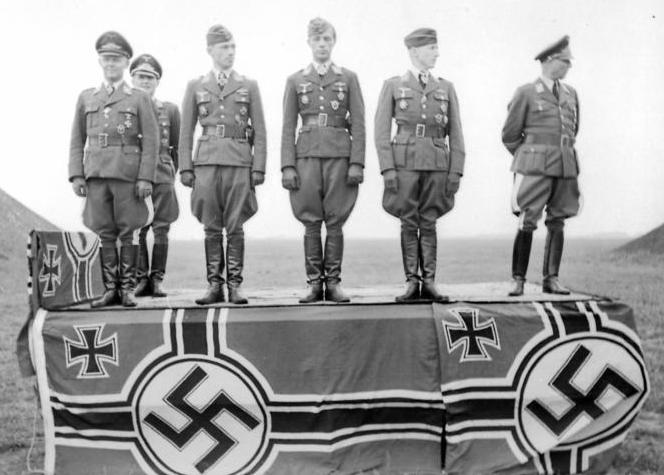
Kammhuber (left) and Helmut Lent in a Nazi propaganda photograph, France, 1942

British intelligence soon discovered the nature of the Kammhuber Line and started studying ways to defeat it. RAF Bomber Command sent aircraft one at a time to force the defenses to be spread as far apart as possible, meaning that any one aircraft would have to deal with little concentrated flak. The Himmelbett centers were only dealing with perhaps one or two planes at a time, making their job much easier. At the urging of R. V. Jones, Bomber Command planned attacks against one target at a time, sending all of the bombers in a "bomber stream", carefully positioned to fly down the middle of a cell. The Himmelbett centers were faced with hundreds of bombers, countering with only a few aircraft of their own. So successful was this tactic that the success rate of the night fighters dropped almost to zero.

=== Technological battle ===
Kammhuber started looking for solutions, and the result was the two-prong concept of Wilde Sau ("wild boar") and Zahme Sau ("tame boar"). In the former, day fighters would be sent up and look for the enemy aircraft from the light of flares dropped from light bombers, searchlights set to a wide beam or illuminating lower clouds, or the fires on the ground below. The Wilde Sau force scored their most notable success during Operation Hydra (the British operation against the V-weapon centre), at Peenemünde on 17 August 1943. De Havilland Mosquito bombers had dropped target marker flares over Berlin and most of the night fighter force was sent there. When it was realized what was really happening, most of these aircraft were too far away and too slow to intercept the raid. However, the Focke-Wulf Fw 190s being flown by the Wilde Sau forces were able to reach them, and about 30 planes entered the third and last wave of the stream and shot down 29 of the 40 Avro Lancaster bombers lost on that raid.

Zahme Sau envisioned freeing the night fighters (now equipped with radar for the final stages of the interception) from the Himmelbett cells and allowing them to attack on their own. This was not all that easy, given the capabilities of the current generation of radars, but newer systems being developed would greatly increase the detection range and angles. In this role the existing cells created as part of the original Kammhuber Line would be used primarily for early warning and vectoring the planes to the stream.

At the same time Kammhuber continued to press for a new dedicated nightfighter design, eventually selecting the Heinkel He 219 Uhu after seeing it demonstrated in 1942. However Milch had decided to cancel the Uhu, and conflict arose between the two. As a result, in 1943 Kammhuber was transferred to Luftflotte 5 in Norway, in command of a handful of outdated planes. After the reorganization of the Luftwaffe in Scandinavia and the dissolution of Luftflotte 5, he became commanding general of the Luftwaffe in Norway (September–October 1944). In 1945 Kammhuber was re-appointed to command of the night fighters, at this point a largely ceremonial position considering the state of the Third Reich at that time.

== Postwar ==
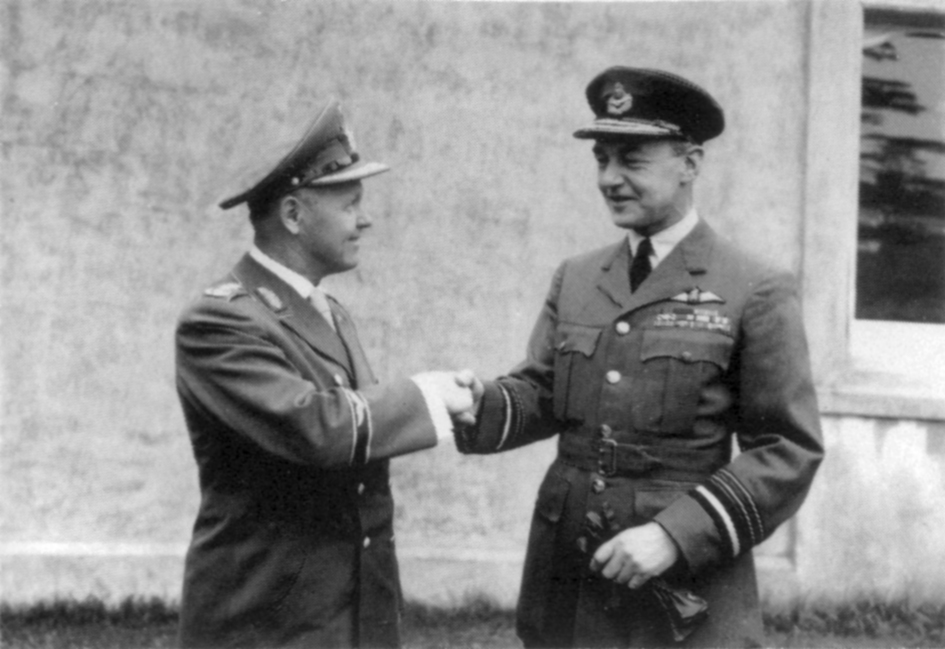
Meeting between Kammhuber and Air Marshal Sir Thomas Pike in 1956. Pike had previously served as an RAF night fighter pilot.

After Germany's capitulation in May 1945, Kammhuber was held by the United States, but was released in April 1948 without charges being brought against him. He wrote a series of monographs for the US Department of Defense on the conduct of the German defenses against the RAF and USAAF. These were later collected into book form (listed under References). In 1953 he published a definitive work on what he learned during the war as Problems in the Conduct of a Day and Night Defensive Air War. He later spent time in Argentina, helping to train the air force under Juan Perón..

Josef Kammhuber returned to Germany and joined the German Air Force while it was being formed. He was promoted to Inspekteur der Luftwaffe, serving in that role between 1956 and 1962. Following the 1961 F-84 Thunderstreak incident, when two West German Republic F-84F Thunderstreaks strayed into East German airspace and flew to West Berlin, Kammhuber and his superior, the West German Minister of Defence, Franz-Josef Strauß, relieved Oberstleutnant Siegfried Barth, commander of the pilots' unit, of his command. After protests, three official investigations and a formal complaint by Barth against Strauß, the former was reinstated in his position. Kammhuber was the only inspector of a branch of the German Armed Forces to achieve the rank of (full) General in this office, although actually designated as a Lieutenant General, because of his services to the development of the post-war Air Force. He retired shortly after the crash of a Starfighter formation on 19 June 1962 near Nörvenich.

Kammhuber died on January 25, 1986, aged 89 in Munich and is buried there.

== Awards ==
- Iron Cross 1914, 1st and 2nd class
- Military Merit, 4th class with Swords (Bavaria)
- Clasp to the Iron Cross, 1st and 2nd class
- Pilot/Observer Badge In Gold with Diamonds
- Honour Cross of the World War 1914/1918
- Knight's Cross of the Iron Cross on 9 July 1941 as Generalmajor and commander of the 1. Nachtjagd-Division
- Grand Officer of the Order of Merit of the Italian Republic 10 March 1958
- Legion of Merit, Commander (2 August 1961)
- Great Cross of Merit of the Federal Republic of Germany with Star and Sash, (21 August 1962)

Military offices
Preceded by Oberst Johann-Volkmar Fisser	Commander of Kampfgeschwader 51 "Edelweiss"; 26 March 1940 – 3 June 1940	Succeeded by Oberst Johann-Volkmar Fisser
Preceded by none	Commander of XII. Fliegerkorps; 9 August 1941 – 15 September 1943	Succeeded by none
Preceded by Generaloberst Hans-Jürgen Stumpff	Commander of Luftflotte 5; 27 November 1943 – 16 September 1944	Succeeded by disbanded
Preceded by none	Commanding General of the Luftwaffe in Norway; 16 September 1944 – 10 October 1944	Succeeded by Generalmajor Eduard Ritter von Schleich
New title	Inspector of the Air Force; 1 June 1957 – 30 September 1962	Succeeded by Generalleutnant Werner Panitzki
