= Long Newnton =

Village in Gloucestershire, England

Coordinates: 51.626°N 2.133°W

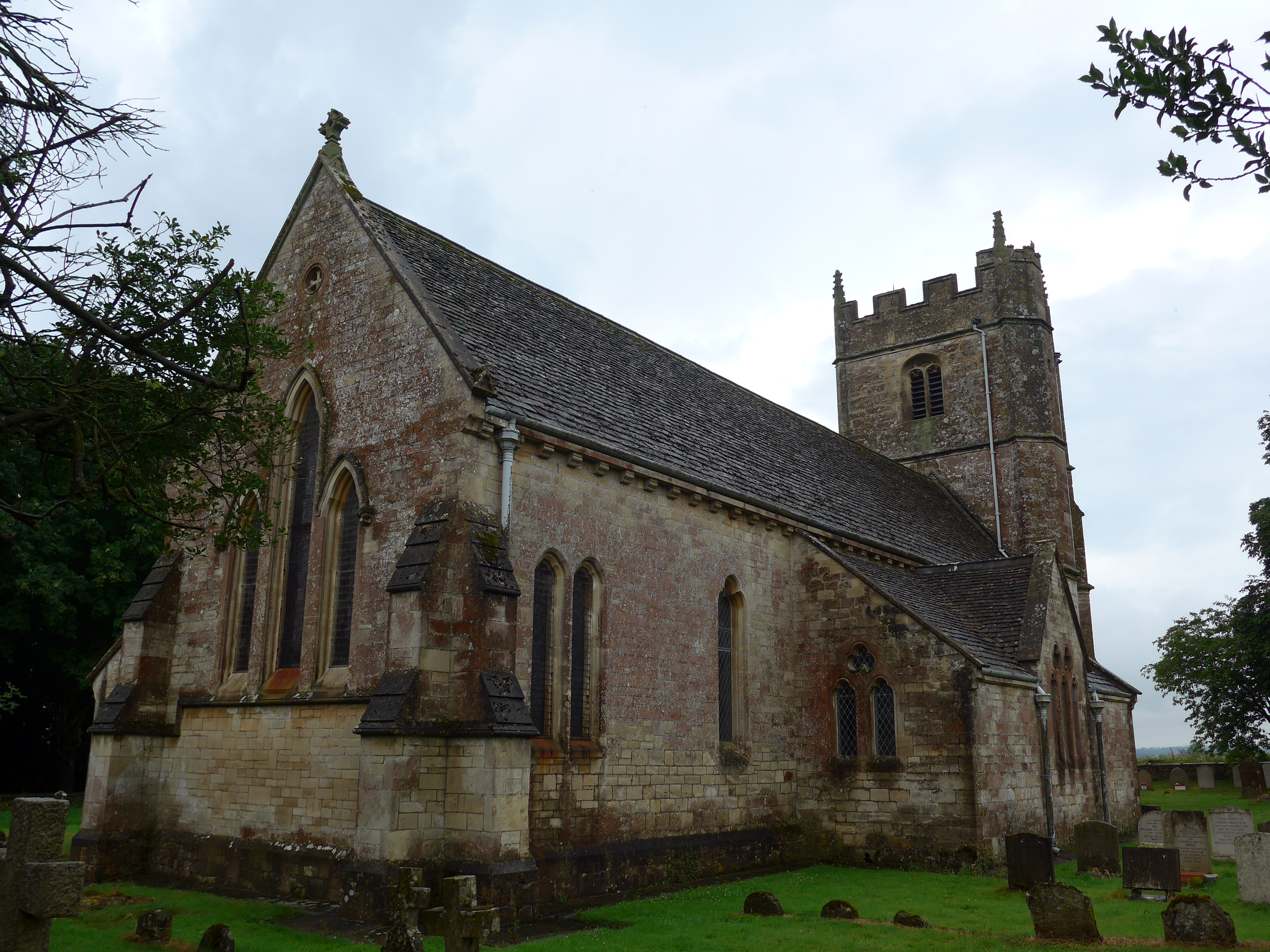
- Holy Trinity Church, Long Newnton

- Location within Gloucestershire
- Population: 211 (2011 census)
- Civil parish: Long Newnton
- District: Cotswold
- Shire county: Gloucestershire
- Region: South West
- Country: England
- Sovereign state: United Kingdom
- Post town: Tetbury
- Postcode district: GL8
- Dialling code: 01666
- Police: Gloucestershire
- Fire: Gloucestershire
- Ambulance: South Western
- UK Parliament: North Cotswolds

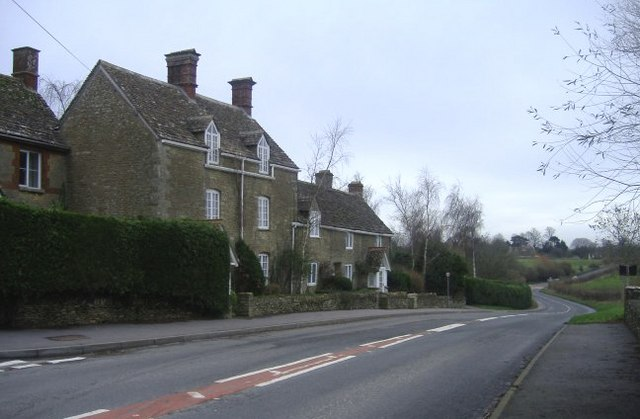
The main road in Long Newnton (B4014)

Long Newnton is a small village and civil parish in Gloucestershire, England (historically in Wiltshire), lying on the B4014 road between Malmesbury (2 km NW) and Tetbury (5 km S). It is near the SW end of the Cotswolds. The population of the parish was 211 at the 2011 census.

== Description ==
The village has no shops: there is a church (Holy Trinity) and between 30 and 60 houses. The nearest large towns are Cheltenham and Swindon. Long Newnton is about an hour from Bristol, Bath, Gloucester and Oxford. Close to Long Newnton is the Estcourt estate which is now owned by an Arabian horse owner.

Estcourt House and other features named for the Estcourt family are in the neighbouring parishes of Shipton Moyne and Tetbury Upton. The village was associated for hundreds of years with the Estcourt family, and the church living was in the gift of the family. The Estcourt fund finances extra-curricular activities for young people aged 13 and over living in Long Newnton.

Holy Trinity Church, an Anglican church in the Early English style, is a Grade II listed building.

The Monarch's Way passes through the parish.

== History ==
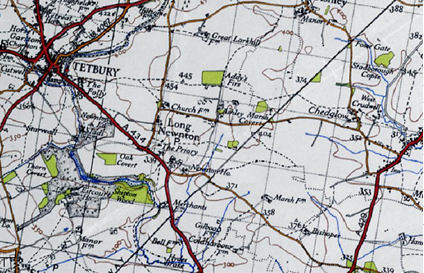
Map of Long Newnton from an Ordnance Survey Map from the 20th Century

In 1868 Long Newnton was Described as:

"a parish in the hundred of Malmesbury, county Wilts, 1½ mile E. of Tetbury, in Gloucestershire, and 4 miles N.W. of Malmesbury. It was called by the Saxons Newantune, and had right of common granted by King Athelstan. The parish is bounded on the W. by a branch of the river Avon. The village, which is small, and wholly agricultural, is situated on the road from Gloucester to Portsmouth. The tithes have been commuted for a rent-charge of £365, with a glebe of 23 acres. The living is a rectory* in the diocese of Gloucester and Bristol, value £370. The church, dedicated to the Holy Trinity, is a modern structure, except the tower, rebuilt at the expense of the landholders. The peal of bells has recently been increased to six. There is a village school, supported by subscription. The Right Hon. Thomas H. S. Sotheron Estcourt, M. P., is lord of the manor."

In the 1870s, Long Newnton was described as follows:

"The village stands near Akeman-street, and near the boundary with Gloucestershire, 1½ mile E of Tetbury, and 6½ S W by W of Tetbury-road r. station; was known to the Saxons as Newantune; and has a post-office under Tetbury. The parish comprises 2,289 acres."

During the First World War, RAF Long Newnton was built on farmland west of the village, on the other side of the Fosse Way (its site is now in the Wiltshire parish of Brokenborough). There was an aerial gunnery range, and the site was later used for storage of ammunition and bombs. In 1939 RAF Long Newnton was made into a decoy airfield, as part of the planning for World War Two which involved strategic lighting to fool Germans yet allow the RAF fighters to avoid landing there. In 1940 the site became an RAF training school and a relief landing ground. By 1947 the RAF base was out of use and the land was bought privately for agricultural purposes. Some of the site is now occupied by solar farms.

The Fosse Way forms part of the parish boundary and also the county boundary with Wiltshire. Long Newnton was one of several parishes which were transferred from Wiltshire to Gloucestershire in 1930.

== Economy ==
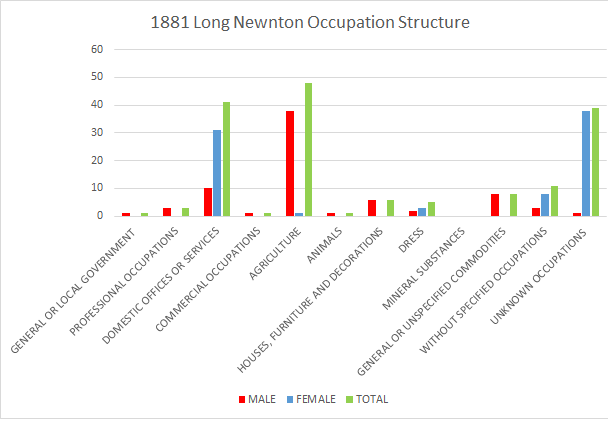
Male, female and total occupation numbers for Long Newnton in 1881

In 2016, the average house value in Long Newnton was £700,000, an increase of £90,000 over the previous ten years.

Earliest records show that through history, the Long Newnton economy has relied upon agriculture as a main employer. Records from 1811 show that out of the 44 families living in the parish, 34 were 'chiefly employed in Agriculture'. In 1881 agriculture continued to be the main occupation for men, with 48 employed by the trade. By 2011, Long Newnton was no longer dependent on agriculture: only 9 were employed in agriculture while 15 were employed in Professional, Scientific and Technical Activities.

== Transport ==
The B4014 Road runs through Long Newnton and is the main access to the village. This road leads to the A433 (Bath Road) in Tetbury and the A429 in Malmesbury.

== Demographics ==
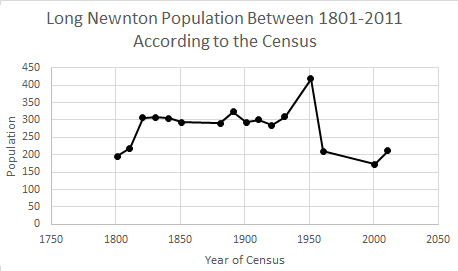
Long Newnton population time series graph in relation to the Census

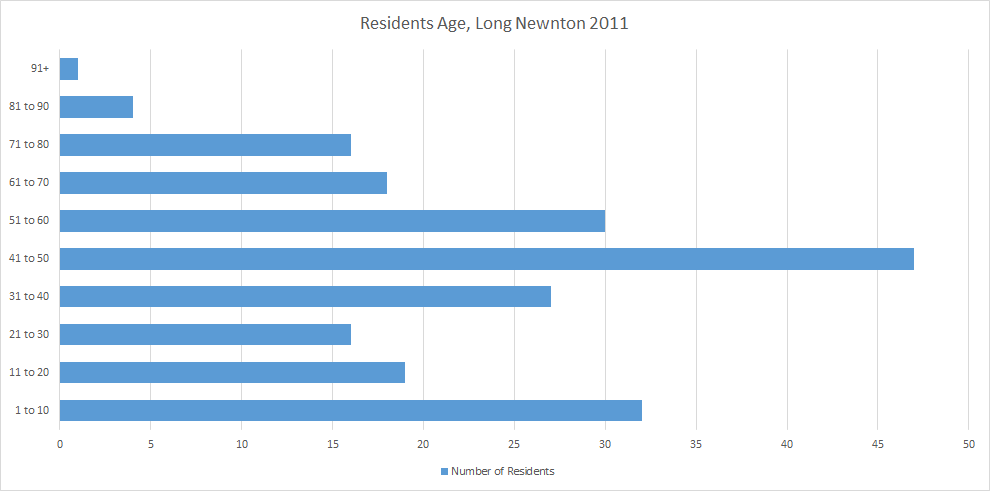
A simple population pyramid for Long Newnton in 2011

Between 1801 and 2011, the population of Long Newnton varied between 150 and 450. Population records start from the 1801 census when the population was just under 200. Numbers increased to around 300 in 1821 and remained around this level into the 20th century. After the 1930 transfer of the parish to Gloucestershire, along with Ashley village, the population had reached 419 by 1951, but by 1961 numbers had fallen to 210. The population of Long Newnton then stabilised and was recorded at 211 in both 2001 and 2011.

Long Newnton does not have a notably young or ageing population, with the majority of local people economically active. In 2011, 154 of the 210 people were between 21 and 70 years old.
