= Siegfried Barth =

German World War II bomber pilot (1916–1997)

- Born: 23 January 1916; Augsburg, Bavaria
- Died: 19 December 1997 (aged 81); Bad Wörishofen, Bavaria
- Military career
- Allegiance: Nazi Germany (to 1945); West Germany
- Branch: Luftwaffe; German Air Force
- Service years: 1936–45, 1956–73
- Rank: Oberstleutnant (Wehrmacht); Oberst (Bundeswehr)
- Nickname: Balbo
- Unit: KG 51
- Commands: IV./KG 51, KG 51, JaBoG 32
- Conflicts: World War II: Battle of France; Battle of Britain; Eastern Front; Operation Barbarossa; Siege of Sevastopol
- Awards: Knight's Cross of the Iron Cross

Siegfried Barth (23 January 1916 – 19 December 1997) was a German bomber pilot in the Luftwaffe during World War II and commander of the fighter-bomber wing Jagdbombergeschwader 32 (JaBoG 32) of the German Air Force. He was a recipient of the Knight's Cross of the Iron Cross, awarded by Nazi Germany. The Knight's Cross of the Iron Cross, and its variants were the highest awards in the military and paramilitary forces of Nazi Germany during World War II. As a Bundeswehr officer, he served at the NATO Supreme Headquarters Allied Powers Europe (SHAPE) from 1969 to 1972.

== World War II ==
Barth was born 23 January 1916 in Augsburg, Bavaria and joined the military service in 1936. He was trained as a pilot before World War II and been a member of Kampfgeschwader 255 "Edelweiß" (KG 255—255th Bomber Wing), which was renamed Kampfgeschwader 51 (KG 51—51st Bomber Wing) on 1 May 1939. When II. Gruppe (2nd group) was formed on 1 April 1940, Barth joined the 4. Staffel (4th squadron) holding the rank of Leutnant (2nd lieutenant). He flew his first combat missions in the Battle of France, bombing airfields and shipping off Dunkirk for which he was awarded the Iron Cross 2nd Class on 17 July 1940.

KG 51 was then relocated to airfields at Étampes-Mondésir and later to Paris-Orly in France. In the Battle of Britain, he bombed British ports and London, Coventry and Portsmouth. Barth was promoted to Oberleutnant and following Operation Barbarossa, the German invasion of the Soviet Union on 22 June 1941, flew in the southern sector of the Eastern Front. He bombed airfields, railway stations as well as tank and troop concentrations in the Proskurov, Lvov, Rostov and Taganrog areas. He was wounded in action on 25 June 1941 when his Junkers Ju 88 A-5 was hit by anti-aircraft fire in the vicinity of Darachow.

Barth was appointed Gruppenkommandeur (Group Commander) on 1 February 1944 of the IV./KG 51, which was based at Hildesheim at the time. Here he was responsible for the tactical training of replacement crews. Initially, they flew the Messerschmitt Me 410, then the Focke-Wulf Fw 190 and lastly the Messerschmitt Me 262, the first operational jet fighter-bomber. He was promoted to Major (major) on 1 May 1944. The Gruppe was renamed to IV./Ergänzungskampfgeschwader 1 (EKG 1—1st Supplemantary Bomber Wing). Barth stayed in this position until 31 March 1945 before being appointed Geschwaderkommodore (Wing Commander) of KG 51 on 19 April 1945. He led the Geschwader in Upper Bavaria until it was disbanded at the end of the war.

== F-84 Thunderstreak incident ==
Barth, commander of Jagdbombergeschwader 32, was initially removed of his command by the Minister of Defence, Franz-Josef Strauß for the 1961 F-84 Thunderstreak incident. He was later, after a number of investigations and complaints, reinstated. On 14 September 1961, two F-84F Thunderstreak of 32 Fighter Bomber Wing crossed into East German airspace due to a navigational error, eventually landing at Berlin Tegel Airport, evading a large number of Soviet fighter planes. The event came at a historically difficult time during the Cold War, one month after the construction of the Berlin Wall.

Barth took his case to the Wehrdienstsenat des Bundesdisziplinarhofs, the highest court of German troops, to have him cleared of the charges brought against him. The court in Munich processed Barth's complaint on 20 December. The court invited as witnesses the generals Josef Kammhuber, Martin Harlinghausen, Werner Panitzki and Werner Streib as well as the lieutenant colonels Walter Krupinski and Walter Grasemann. However, the Federal Minister of Defence made it known through his Secretary of State, Volkmar Hopf, before the court, that the Minister sees himself unable to give the witness the testimony rights. Nevertheless, Strauß' conduct in dismissing Barth was found to be at fault, and the latter was reinstated in his position. Strauß however ignored this decision until Hellmuth Heye, Ombudsman for the Military, forced him to accept it.

== Awards ==
- Iron Cross (1939) 2nd and 1st Class
- Ehrenpokal der Luftwaffe on 4 May 1942 as Oberleutnant and pilot
- German Cross in Gold on 27 July 1942 as Oberleutnant in the 4./KG 51
- Knight's Cross of the Iron Cross on 2 October 1942 as Hauptmann and Staffelkapitän of the 4./KG 51

Military offices
Preceded by Oberstleutnant Rudolf Hallensleben	Commander of Kampfgeschwader 51; 19 April 1945 – 28 April 1945	Succeeded by disbanded
Preceded by —	Commander of Jagdbombergeschwader 32; 22 July 1958 – 27 October 1961	Succeeded by Oberst Paul Schauder
