= RAF Long Newnton =

RAF Long Newnton
- Long Newnton, Wiltshire in England

Site information
- Type: Satellite Station
- Owner: Air Ministry
- Operator: Royal Air Force
- Controlled by: RAF Flying Training Command

Location
- Shown within Wiltshire
- Coordinates: 51°37′34″N 2°06′16″W

Site history
- Built: 1940
- In use: November 1940 – April 1947

Airfield information
Runways
Direction	Length and surface
00/00	Grass
00/00	Grass

Royal Air Force Long Newnton or more simply RAF Long Newnton is a former Royal Air Force satellite airfield in north Wiltshire, England, close to the Gloucestershire village of Long Newnton.

The following units were here at some point:

- No. 3 (Pilots) Advanced Flying Unit RAF
- No. 3 Service Flying Training School RAF
- No. 9 Service Flying Training School RAF
- No. 11 Maintenance Unit RAF
- No. 14 Service Flying Training School RAF
- No. 15 (Pilots) Advanced Flying Unit RAF
- Cotswold Gliding Club
