= Kampfgeschwader 51 =

German bomber wing during WWII

- Active: 1939–45
- Country: Nazi Germany
- Branch: Luftwaffe
- Type: Bomber Wing
- Role: Air interdiction Close air support Maritime interdiction Offensive counter air Counter-air defence
- Size: Air Force Wing
- Nickname: Edelweiss
- Engagements: Western Front; Eastern Front

Commanders
- Notable commanders: Josef Kammhuber

Insignia
- Identification symbol: Geschwaderkennung of 9K

Kampfgeschwader 51 "Edelweiss" (KG 51) (Battle Wing 51) was a Luftwaffe bomber wing during World War II.

The unit began forming in May 1939 and completed forming in December 1939, and took no part in the invasion of Poland which started the war.

It first served in the Phoney War then the Battle of France in May and June 1940. From July to October 1940, it fought in the Battle of Britain and then in the night intruder role during the Blitz until March 1941.

It supported the Balkans Campaign in April 1941 and served on the Eastern Front from June 1941 until December 1943.

In 1944 and 1945, it served exclusively in the West; in the Defence of the Reich, Western Front and in Operation Steinbock. All Groups and squadrons of KG 51 disbanded and reformed during the course of the war. Few remained active by the German surrender in May 1945.

The wing operated the Dornier Do 17, Heinkel He 111 and Junkers Ju 88 light and medium bombers, the Messerschmitt Me 410 heavy fighter and the Messerschmitt Me 262 jet fighter.

== Formation ==
KG 51 was created on 1 May 1939. The bomber wing was formed from the redesignated KG 255. The Stabsstaffel was formed at Landsberg-Lech with the Dornier Do 17M. Oberst Dr. Johann-Volkmar Fisser was appointed Geschwaderkommodore. Fisser oversaw the creation of I./KG 51 under the command of Oberstleutnant Hans Korte on the same day. The Do 17E was given to the group and it trained throughout the summer and converted to the Heinkel He 111 just before hostilities commenced. The training and mobilisation of the group was completed on 20 August 1939 and it was redeployed Memmingen. 34 of 36 aircraft were serviceable on 1 September 1939.

II./KG 51 was ordered to begin forming on 1 December 1939 at Breslau. Perhaps for administration reasons the group began to form in Austria at Wiener Neustadt. The process began on 1 March 1940 and completed on 15 April 1940. The group's late creation enabled it to be equipped with the newer Junkers Ju 88. Major Friedrich Winkler was chosen as the group's first commanding officer. Winkler could not achieve combat readiness until May 1940. It moved from Munchen-Riem to the western border; the precise location of the base is unknown. Only 15 of the group's 38 bombers were operational.

III./KG 51 was formed on 1 May 1939. It trained through the summer and the crews switched from the Do 17E to He 111H. Oberst Alois Stoeckl was given command. It was moved to Memmingen in August. 33 of the 36 bombers were operational. The third group was placed under Luftflotte 3 along with I./KG 51. It completed the conversion on the eve of war, from 15 through to the 30 August 1939.

Stab./KG 51 was held in reserve in southern Germany and took no part in the Invasion of Poland which began World War II in Europe. Instead the nine aircraft at Fisser's disposal were used to drop propaganda leaflets over France on 6 November 1939 and flew other reconnaissance missions during the Phoney War. Korte led the first group into action in the same manner. It spent eight months in training but was known to have dropped leaflets in the Brest to Nantes area on 17 November. The group moved to Greifswald to convert to the Ju 88 in March 1940 and moved back to Memmingen on 6 May.

III./KG 51 appears to have been most active. From Landsberg-Lech it flew leaflet operations from 6 November. Bordeaux and Marseille were the destinations on 17 November. By April 1940 the group had flown 18 such sorties and suffered no losses (apparently) up to the 25 April.

== War Service ==
On 10 May 1940, the Wehrmacht initiated Fall Gelb, which began the Battle of the Netherlands, Belgium and France. The plan was for Army Group B to invade the Low Countries, draw in the French Army and the British Army to Belgium and allow Army Group A to advance through the Ardennes, north of the Maginot Line to the English Channel. The German Army could then destroy the Allied forces in the encirclement. KG 51 was placed under the command of Fliegerkorps V (Flying Corps 5).

=== Western Europe ===
On the first day of the offensive, I./KG 51, now under the command of Major Hans Bruno Schulz-Heyn (since 19 December 1939), were mid-way through conversion to the Ju 88. The group was abnormally large, possessing some 18 operational He 111s from a total of 36, and another 7 operational Ju 88s from 23 at Lechfeld. KG 51 began operations at 03:56 that morning.

The group was ordered to bomb the French Air Force base at Dijon Air Base. 8./KG 51 set out but through navigational error bombed the German border town Freiburg causing 100 civilian casualties and killing 57, including 22 children. To cover up the mistake, Nazi propaganda minister Joseph Goebbels blamed the British and French for, what became known to the Germans, as the "Freiburg massacre."

On 15 May 9./KG 51 recorded three losses; two in combat with 607 Squadron and another to the French Groupe de Chasse I/3 (GCI/3) in the Reims area. I./KG 51 was known to have been active in the Chalons-sur-Marne area on 10 May. III./KG 51 were also operating in the same area and were known to have bombed targets in the Valenciennes area on 15 May. The Stab unit and all three groups were active in the Sedan breakthrough.

I. and II./KG 51 utilised the dive-bombing capability of their Ju 88s and, with the rest of Fliegerkorps V, protected Heinz Guderian's XIX Army Corps' southern flank in Air interdiction. The attacks against rail targets were successful. German reconnaissance reported 33 trains stopped south west Verdun. The French rail network was efficient and such successes were only temporary, but it slowed reinforcements and supply.

All three groups were involved in the Battle of Dunkirk after the Panzer Divisions reached the Channel on 20 May. I. and II./KG 51 were known to have supported the Siege of Lille. 3. and 5. Staffel lost a bomber over Lille on 19 May while 4. and 6. Staffel suffered damage to one of their aircraft. Their assailants were from 1 and 73 Squadron. The Messerschmitt Bf 110s from V.(Z)./LG 1 provided escort.

On 3 June Operation Paula, the massed attacks on airfields and factories in the Paris area, began. The operation was to support the final stage (Fall Rot) of the offensive. KG 51 does not appear to have taken part. At least one source does not place KG 51 on the order of battle for Paula. Stab./KG 51 was certainly operating on this date, for Geschwaderkommodore Josef Kammhuber, was shot down and became a temporary prisoner of war. Kammhuber was released after the French surrender but did not return to KG 51. Fisser, whom Kammhuber had replaced on 27 March 1940 to allow him operational experience, assumed the commanding officer role again later that day.

KG 51 supported Fall Rot, the second part of the invasion. KG 51 lost four in the first five days as the Luftwaffe lost 101 aircraft but claimed 221 aircraft destroyed.

II./KG 51 appears to have supported the advance in eastern France to the Switzerland border from 1 June, completing the encirclement of the Maginot Line. The transit and movement of KG 51 during the campaign is not known owing to sparse records. Second group did move to Étampes-Mondésir south-west of Paris on 20 June after stops in Munich and Stuttgart. I./KG 51 was based at Paris-Orly on the same date, but their movements from 10 May are largely unknown. III./KG 51 joined the second group at Étampes on 20 June, days before the Armistice of 22 June 1940. The bases were badly damaged and bore the scared of German air attacks. Prisoners of war were used to repair facilities.

KG 51 is believed to have been engaged in harassing attacks over Britain at night from 28/29 June. The very small-scale raids targets ports in Wales and factories in the Bristol area.

=== Battle of Britain ===
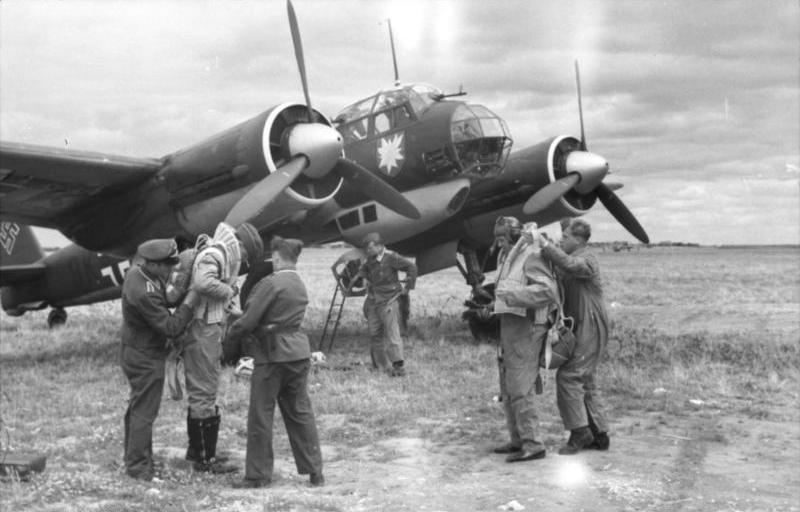
Junkers Ju 88 A-1 of Kampfgeschwader 51 (I./KG 51) "Edelweiß" before take-off

In July 1940, the Luftwaffe began the Kanalkampf phase of the Battle of Britain bombing convoys in the English Channel. In August, the air offensives extended to the United Kingdom mainland. The objective was to destroy RAF Fighter Command over southern England, at the least, in preparation for Operation Sea Lion. KG 51 played a large role in the air operations over the summer and autumn, 1940. KG 51 remained with Fliegerkorps V, a component Luftflotte 3.

Fisser led various groups in action over England. The Stab unit's only aircraft belonged to Fisser and he paid the price of leading from the front on 12 August 1940 when his Ju 88 was shot down. Group Commander Hans Bruno Schulz-Heyn replaced him until 31 August when Oberst Paul Koester took command from 1 September 1940. Fisser's death occurred attacking Ventnor radar station on the Isle of Wight. Fisser had become a victim of Hawker Hurricane fighters from No. 213 Squadron RAF.

I./KG 51 recorded its first (a Ju 88) loss on the battle on 1 July 1940, near Dunbar, Scotland. It attacked Royal Navy destroyers off St Catherine's Head and Start Point on 11 and 12 July. The Start Point attack cost the group one Ju 88; downed by No. 236 Squadron RAF operating Bristol Blenheims. The Catherine's Head operation cost it one aircraft shot down by No. 145 Squadron RAF. The group flew bombing raids against Bristol on 17 July and lost a Ju 88 off Land's End on 27 July. 5. Staffel flew on operation near Stroud in Gloucestershire on 25 July; one of their number became the first to fall on British soil.

II. and III./KG 51 suffered one loss; the former was lost in action against No. 43 Squadron RAF and the latter was damaged by ground-fire. First group suffered another loss on 17 July over Bristol to No. 92 Squadron RAF. Losses were sporadic as the intensity of the air offensive increased. Second group lost another Ju 88 on 25 July followed by a I./KG 51 Ju 88 two days later at the hands of No. 234 Squadron RAF. Two Ju 88s from the second group and one from the third were damaged on 2 August.

On 12 August first group raided the Portsmouth and Isle of Wight area during which KG 51's commanding officer Fisser was killed. Fisser led 68 Ju 88s into action protected by 150 Bf 109s and Bf 110s. It met with heavy resistance, and some 58 RAF fighters engaged the bombers. and KG 51 lost 10 bombers with another two damaged. Along with Fisser, 28 men were posted missing and 11 were confirmed killed. I./KG 51 lost two Ju 88s each to No. 266 Squadron RAF and 213 Squadron; one damaged by 213 made it back to France. 145 and 43 Squadron accounted for one II./KG 51 each and III./KG 51 lost one destroyed and two damaged by No. 152 Squadron RAF and another destroyed by ground-fire.

By Adlertag (13 August) I./KG 51 had 21 operational Ju 88s from a total of 30. On 13 August, the Germans made an all-out effort to destroy Fighter Command. KG 51 struck at RAF Bibury Spithead harbour and Ventnor radar station. No known losses were sustained by KG 51 but German losses overall were substantial and the attacks failed. The wing's groups bombing operations are largely unknown until 19 August when Bibury was attacked by third group and they lost one bomber to No. 602 Squadron RAF and another damaged in first group as the attacked coastal targets off St Catherine's Point. Third group lost one bomber off the Kent coast on 24 August, but the target is unknown.

On 24 August, KG 51 executed a speedy attack on the Home Fleet base at Portsmouth and in less than four minutes 50 tons of bombs were dropped. The town was also hit and 83 people were killed, 191 wounded and 700 made homeless. An oil installation was hit and burned for 36 hours. One bomber was lost.

On 25 August II./KG 51 was in action in the Hastings area. With II./KG 54 and escorted by 103 Bf 110s from ZG 2, ZG 76 and V.(Z)/LG 1, KG 51 were intercepted by 17, 87 and No. 609 Squadron RAF. 1./ZG 2 lost four Bf 110s, II./KG 51 reported two losses; one to 87 and 615 Squadron. 87 Squadron damaged a third machine. The target was probably in the Portsmouth area. Hugo Sperrle ordered the raid as earlier patrols by German fighters over Kent had failed to tempt Fighter Command into combat.

Another source states that RAF Warmwell, Weymouth and Portland were the targets and the German formation split into three to attack them. At Warmwell, two hangars and the sick bay were hit. A bomb landed on the perimeter and nearly severed all of the telephone and printer lines. The Luftwaffe continued to attack airfields in the last week of August. I. and II./KG 51 were in action on the 31 August as they reported three damaged bombers in accidents but no information is available on their targets.

=== Blitz ===
All three groups reported on bomber damaged in accidents on 7 September. KG 51 formed part of the German bomber fleets attack on London which signaled a shift from attacking airfields to Britain's economic and commercial centre. In the mistaken belief that RAF Fighter Command was finished and an attack on London would force it to commit their last reserves, the Germans began The Blitz. On 15 September, the all out-attack on London, known as Battle of Britain Day, I./KG 51 lost one bomber and another damaged while II./KG 51 also lost a Ju 88 in the afternoon attacks.

On 30 September I./KG 51 sent 11 Ju 88s on a diversion operation to Southampton while KG 55 tried to bomb the Westland plant at Yeovil. I./KG 77 assisted in a second diversion to London. Nine squadrons intercepted the KG 55 Heinkel He 111s which were protected by powerful escort forces from ZG 26, JG 2, JG 53 while 602 Squadron caught the 11 Ju 88s from KG 51. One was lost before the group rapidly retired across the Channel before any bombs were dropped on land. No further losses appear to have been suffered until 19 September when one Ju 88 was shot down by 152 Squadron and another two damaged.

By 9 October, KG 51 had shifted to night operations. That night it was probably involved in an attack on Crewe from which one crew failed to return and another three bombers were damaged on their return. On 4 November II./KG 51 bombed Redditch and took part in the London Blitz the same night with the first group, and continued to do so until 1941. Swanton Morley and West Raynham were targeted on the night of the 5 November by III./KG 51 and on 6/7 November Eastbourne was attacked by the second group which bombed Hastings the night before.

All three groups were involved in Operation Mondscheinsonate (Moonlight Sonata), which was the code word for the attack on Coventry on 14 November 1940. On 20/21 November III./KG 51 was involved in the Birmingham Blitz, when it bombed Castle Bromwich and West Bromwich. All three groups supported the Liverpool Blitz on 28/29 November and then bombed Brighton with I./KG 51 in the early hours.

In December, the third group bombed Derby on 23/24 and was involved in several other raids, being substantially involved in the Manchester Blitz on 22/23 and 23/24 December 1940. Most notably all three groups were involved in the 29 December 1940 attack on the British capital, which became known as the Second Great Fire of London.

Over the course of the night campaign, and into 1941, all three groups flew against a target multiple times and the information given is not exhaustive though a complete list of each group's operations are known. KG 51 was involved in the Glasgow Blitz, Hull Blitz, Sheffield Blitz, Plymouth Blitz, Portsmouth Blitz and attacks against other towns and cities including Swansea. The last night operation appears to have been Plymouth and Devonport, which was attacked by all three groups on the night of the 22/23 March 1941.

III./KG 51 had lost 12 aircraft and 19 damaged by 31 October. By the time it had withdrawn to Wiener Neustadt to equip with the Ju 88A-4, it had only 19 operational aircraft from 23. The condition of the other two groups is unknown.

=== Balkans Campaign ===
Stab., I. and II./KG 51 saw action during the Balkans Campaign. Third group remained stationed with them in Austria but probably did not take part for unknown reasons. First group committed 29 Ju 88s (17 operational) and the second group 18 Ju 88s from 28 in total. I./KG 51 was then led by Hauptmann Kurt von Greiff, who replaced Schulz-Heyn on 12 August 1940. Winkler was replaced as commander of the second group on 31 March 1941 with Hauptmann Max Stadelmeier. Both groups were placed under the command of Luftflotte 4.

I./KG 51 took part in the Bombing of Belgrade and attacked retreating Allied forces through Greece. It handed over its remaining aircraft to Lehrgeschwader 1. I./KG 51 also took part, bombing Belgrade and Athens on 15 April. The group transferred to Krumovo in Bulgaria on 16 April and it attacked Khalkis harbour the same day. Athens was bombed again on 19 April as the Allied line collapsed in the Battle of Greece. It bombed Greek harbours and Crete over the 23 to 24 April. It bombed the Corinth Canal on 26 April and Allied shipping in Suda Bay on 3 May. On 13 May operations halted abruptly. It handed over its aircraft to I./LG 1 on and went to Austria by train to refit.

II./KG 51 suffered a loss in operations near Banja Luka on 12 April and carried out close air support attacks around Sarajevo and the Pecs area on 14 April. Possibly carried out attacks on Greek ports at Volos on 15 April then Chalkis on 19 and 20 April. The rest of the group's activities in the Balkans after this date are largely unknown.

=== Eastern Front ===
KG 51 remained with Fliegerkorps V under the command of Robert Ritter von Greim, which was attached to Luftflotte 4. The wing was ordered to support Army Group South's invasion of the Ukrainian SSR for Operation Barbarossa, the invasion of the Soviet Union.

KG 51 lost 15 aircraft on the first day of the invasion, 22 June 1941. Neighbouring KG 55 lost 10 bombers over the airfields. I./KG 51 located to Juck and all 22 of its Ju 88s were operational. The condition of second group was 29 of 36 Ju 88s ready, third group had 28 of 32 operational Ju 88s. II. and III. were based at Krosno. KG 51 claimed 100 aircraft destroyed on the ground.

The attack on Kurovitsa devastated the airfield and cost the wing seven Ju 88s before fighters from JG 3 rescued them. The war diary of KG 51 remarked that day, "Skillful and aggressive attacks by Russian fighter units ensured that the struggle for air supremacy was no easy game." The air attacks against the Red Air Force were very effective and destroyed or damaged 2,500 aircraft. Fliegerkorps V attacked 77 airfields from 22 to 25 June and claimed 774 Soviet aircraft on the ground. On 26 June the air corps suffered the highest loss of all German formations as it suffered 28 aircraft destroyed; eight bombers and another nine damaged. With no Junkers Ju 87 units in the air corps, KG 51, KG 55 and KG 54 were forced to use their medium bombers in the direct ground attack role for which they were not best suited.

In June KG 51 was notably involved in Operation München and Battle of Brody. At Brody, KG 51, KG 54, and KG 55, contributed a series of heavy low-level attacks against Soviet ground targets. The headquarters of the Soviet 15th Mechanised Corps was destroyed, and its commander, General-Major Ignat Karpezo, was wounded. The Luftwaffe destroyed some 201 Soviet tanks in this area. The battle was a major victory but it cost KG 51 one-third of its strength; 30 of the bombers were destroyed and nine damaged in the first eight days; KG 54 reported 16 Ju 88s out of action and KG 55 46 He 111s.

On 1 July the three groups accounted for 220 motor vehicles and 40 tanks west of L'vov. On 5 July Fliegerkorps V supported the advance of the Third Romanian Army and the Hungarian Army, while the 1st Panzer Army broke through Soviet lines. It claimed 18 trains and 500 wagons destroyed on this date. Two days later KG 51 lost another four Ju 88s III./KG 51 was withdrawn from the front altogether. By this time the Soviet South-West Front Air Force had been decimated.

KG 51's strength was down to one-third by 30 June. KG 51's next major operation occurred in August and September 1941 at the Battle of Uman, Battle of Kiev. Some of the Staffeln (squadrons) supported the Battle of the Sea of Azov into October in which it attacked Black Sea Fleet naval forces—the fleet could access the Azov from the Black Sea via the Kerch straight.

On 7 August the Soviet 26th Army attackedin the Boguslav sector and Fliegerkorps V threw all forces into the battle. Low cloud forced bombers to operate below 75 metres (246 feet) in rolling attacks. 48 tanks and 148 vehicles were claimed halting the attack. KG 51's air fleet claimed 300 vehicles on 54 tanks on the 10 August alone. Fliegerkorps V and KG 51 accounted for 58 tanks, 22 artillery battlers and 300 motor vehicles in the encirclement battle. Losses however, forced the air corps to withdraw four of its bomber groups, III./KG 51 was one of them. At Kiev, KG 51 and Fliegerkorps helped seal the pocket and destroy 727 motor vehicles. At least one Staffel (number 3) took part in the Odessa siege and attacked the transport Kursk. Until the 22 September the bulk of KG 51 was busy interdicting supply routes into the Kiev area. It flew 810 sorties in September 1941 and was credited with 27 aircraft shot down, 290 vehicles, 22 tanks, one train and 5 freighters. In return it lost just two aircraft.

In From the 24 September and into October KG 51 and its air corps attack the rail lines and traffic as the First Panzer Army advanced to the Sea of Azov. At Dnepropetrovsk and the line from it to Stalino, at Mariupol, Taganrog and Rostov Soviet rail traffic was paralyzed. Attacks on airfields from 25 September led to claims of 43 destroyed on the ground in the Kharkov and Bogodukhov area. KG 51 bombed, with KG 27, the port of Berdyansk, to prevent the escape of the Soviet 18th army which was evacuating by sea. In October KG 51 flew 412 missions, claimed 10 aircraft shot down, 315 vehicles destroyed, eight trains, one heavy cruiser, two freighters, for three bombers lost.

From November it supported to Army Group South's retreat to the Mius River, forty miles west of Rostov after the First battle of Rostov.

Between 1–30 November 1941 the unit relocated to Nikolayev, Ukraine. In a month it flew 412 sorties, and was credited with a further 10 aircraft, 8 trains, 315 vehicles, one heavy cruiser (the Voroshilov on 2 November, the ship was heavily damaged and put out of action for several months) and two freighters destroyed for the loss of three aircraft. In February 1942 the Geschwader destroyed one train, some 100 vehicles in 335 sorties for three losses. The month before, it lost just five bombers, mainly through skillful marksmanship by gunners but also sparse Soviet fighter forces.

=== Crimea to Stalingrad ===
KG 51 played an important Maritime interdiction role in the Battle of the Kerch Peninsula, Crimean campaign, and Black Sea battles. Stab, I. and III./KG 51 were deployed to hit all ports in the Crimean and Caucasus regions.

KG 51 was still with Greim's Fliegerkorps V. III./KG 51 was one of few units with specialist anti-shipping training. It arrived from Izyum but had too few bombs to operate effectively, suffered from logistics issues and was forced to operate from the primitive Saki airfield.

On 17 March 1942 III./KG 51 bombed and damaged the 4,629-ton tanker Kuybyshev in the port of Novorossiysk. On 18 March, KG 51 Ju 88s sank the 3,689 long tons (3,748 t) transport Georgiy Dimitrov. Further damage was done on 23 March when nine Ju 88s of KG 51 sank the minelayers Ostrovskiy and GS-13 and a motor torpedo boat in Tuapse harbour. They also damaged two submarines (S-33 and D-5). That evening, He 111s of KG 27 claimed one 5,000 long tons (5,100 t) and two 2,000 long tons (2,000 t) ships sunk.

Soviet records recorded the sinking of the 2,960 long tons (3,010 t) steamer V. Chapayev, with the loss of 16 crew and 86 soldiers. KG 51 returned to Tuapse on 24 March and sank the transports Yalta and Neva. On 2 April, the Kuybyshev was intercepted and sunk. So great was the loss of shipping that Soviet land forces were ordered to cease all offensive operations to conserve supplies. In the eight-week air offensive, from early February to the end of March, the Black Sea Transport Fleet had been reduced from 43,200 long tons (43,900 t) of shipping to 27,400 long tons (27,800 t). Six transports had been lost and six were under repair. The successes led KG 51's commanding officer Oberst Paul Körster to be chosen to lead several anti-sipping missions by the air fleet command.

On 28 April 1942 Fliegerkorps VIII arrived in the Crimea, along with its commanding officer Wolfram von Richthofen. KG 51 was subordinated to this air corps for Kerch. Once Kerch had ended, KG 51 was heavily involved in the Siege of Sevastopol. It was involved in the enormous bombing operations against the city and on 19 June 1942, 2./KG 51 sank the floating anti-aircraft batter Number 3, named by the Soviets as Ne'tron ("Don't Touch Me"), in Svernaya Bay. The shortage of ordnance forced crews to fly 25 to 30 bombing missions per day, dropping individual bombs in dive-bombing attacks from 11,000 to 2,500 ft which put enormous strains on the men in sweltering conditions.

Before the siege ended, KG 51 was moved to the developing crisis further north. It fought at the Second Battle of Kharkov, under the temporary command of Fliegerkorps IV. From 20 to 21 May KG 51 flew 294 individual sorties; a third of those by III./KG 51. The air corps was credited with the destruction 596 aircraft in the air 19 on the ground, 227 tanks, 3,038 vehicles, 24 artillery batteries, 49 artillery pieces, 22 locomotives, six complete trains for the cost of 49 aircraft. After the defeat of the Soviet offensive, KG 51 continued intensive bombing operations. One group flew 300 missions from in preparation for Operation Blue, between 10 and 13 June 1942. KG 51 attacked airfields in support of the Battle of Voronezh and bombed the city.

KG 51 acted as a fire-brigade as Army Group South became stretched, fighting in the Battle of Stalingrad and also the Battle of the Caucasus, as German forces pushed to the Terek River. It fought in vain to support the First Panzer Army's advance to the Baku oilfields which had failed by October 1942. On 17 November 1942 the second group bombed Soviet shipping in the Caspian Sea; it bombed Astrakhan on 17th day. It then supported the German Seventeenth Army's retreat across the Taman Peninsula.

In November, after the Soviet counterattack which encircled Axis forces in Stalingrad (Operation Uranus), KG 51 was removed from supporting Army Group Don to assisting with the relief of the pocket by attacking Soviet bottlenecks, particularly the Don-Chir bridgeheads and the rapidly collapsing front around the city. On 8 January KG 51's commanding officer Oberst Heinrich Conrady was killed in action by ground fire over the Manychskaya bridgehead. The crews came under fire from areas they believed were German-held, such was the rapid Soviet advance. Conrady was one of three KG 51 crews lost.

During the siege, on 30 January 1943, KG 51 destroyed the Soviet 51st Army's Headquarters, near Salsk. Dropping 100 – 250 kg bombs, a wave of Junkers Ju 88s and Heinkel He 111s destroyed the communications centre, working offices of the chief-of-staff, the operational headquarters and the offices of the operational duty officer. Up to 20 buildings and personnel billets were also destroyed. Casualties among personnel were also very high.

=== Kursk to disbandment ===
Second group remained with Fliegerkorps IV and fought at the Third Battle of Kharkov which stabilised the front-line in March 1943. It also operated in the Belgorod sector and the town was captured four days after Kharkov. I./KG 51 played an instrumental role in stopping Markian Popov's tank force as it advanced on Zaporozhye. It was the group's last contribution. It left the base of Poltava for Germany to convert to heavy fighters and redeploy to Defence of the Reich duties.

In the summer it was also involved in Operation Citadel, the Battle of Kursk. In May and June 1943, KG 51 was involved in preparatory strategic bombing attacks. KG 51 bombed rail targets in the Orel sector in May 1943. On 9 May KG 51's commanding officer Major Egbert von Frankenberg und Proschlitz defected to the Soviet Union taking many secret documents with him. Hanns Heise replaced him.

Robert Ritter von Greim's Luftflotte 6, with support from KG 55's Luftflotte 4, was assigned seven bomber wings to carry out the offensive—KG 55, KG 3, KG 4, KG 27, KG 51, KG 53 and KG 100. Even Wolfram Freiherr von Richthofen, the leading ground-support exponent, agreed to the operation. It was felt the Luftwaffe could render greater assistance to the army this way. The planners focused on targets that were in range of the He 111-equipped Geschwader.

Factory Number 24, at Kuybyshev Oblast produced a quarter of all aviation engines in the Soviet Union and 85 percent of all Ilyushin Il-2 engines, Factory Number 26 at Ufa, with 31 percent of total production and 60 percent of all fighter aircraft engine production, Factory Number 16 at Kazan, producing 12 percent of the total and 60 percent of all medium bomber aircraft engines, Factory Number 45, in Moscow, with five percent total but 15 percent of IL-2 engines, and finally Factory Number No. 466 at Gorkiy with five percent total and one-tenth of all fighter engine production were the targets. Three of the five ball bearings plants were in range, the synthetic rubber plant at Yaroslavl (23 percent of output) and oil refineries along with steel plants were all considered. Surviving intelligence maps show the crude oil and ball bearing plant at Saratov was also considered. In the end phase, the production of tanks and armoured vehicles received the weight of the attacks. The facilities at Gorkiy drew most attention for it produced 15 percent of T-34s and was the largest plant west of the Urals. In error, planners targeted the State Motor Vehicles Plant No. 1 Molotov, the largest automobile plant in the country which produced the less threatening T-60 and T-70. The Krasnoye Sormovo Factory No. 112 was targeted because of its production of munitions.

On 4 June 1943 the operation began. The Luftwaffe returned to attack the repair workshops over two subsequent nights with a force of 300 bombers. During repeated attacks between 4 and 22 June, all of the plant's 50 buildings, 9,000 metres (30,000 feet) of conveyors, 5,900 units of process equipment and 8,000 engines were destroyed or damaged. Russian authorities have still not disclosed how many people were killed. German wartime estimates are 15,000, but are not supported. Owing to failed intelligence and targeting, the attacks against the Molotov factory disrupted the T-70 light tank. Roughly half of the Soviet light tank production—5, 134 from 9, 375 in 1942, was made there. Factory Number 112, produced the T-34 tank, which was only lightly affected by the raids. Repair was rapid, and completed within six weeks. Night fighter and search light defences were also increased. The factory was fully operational by 18 August. In the fourth quarter of 1943, it superseded production quotas by 121 percent. Factory Number 112 went on to produce 2,851 T-34s in 1943 and 3, 619 in 1944 up from 2, 718 in 1942. The He 111 units dropped 1,015 tons of bombs in total, losing only six aircraft, through the Soviets claimed 145.

Stab., II. and III./KG 51 remained to support Citadel from 5 July. KG 51 based on the northern sector near Bryansk supporting the German Ninth Army and Second Panzer Army. II./KG 51 was involved in attacks on artillery positions immediately. The offensive bogged down and KG 51 supported the German defence against Operation Kutuzov in vain. On 13 July it lost four bombers against the Soviet 1st Air Army. II./KG 51 and III./KG 51 took part in the battles around Orel which helped avert the destruction of the German Ninth Army. Losses are not clear, but second group lost two aircraft on 17 July. II./KG 51 remained supporting the general German retreat flying anti-tank and interdiction operations. It retreated to Kirovograd on 1 September and ceased operations on 20 September. III./KG 51 flew its 10,000th mission on 12 July and retreated to Kirovograd on 1 August. It left the Eastern Front on 31 August 1943, never to return.

=== Eastern Mediterranean ===
II./KG 51 was relocated to Salonika from 18 September. It supported the successful Dodecanese campaign. It attacked Allies ships in the Battle of Kos and Battle of Leros. It attacked Allied forces in and off Samos and Kios. By 15 October it had lost four aircraft and three damaged. On 14 November the group flew its 13,000th combat mission. On 22 November it attacked five warships and claimed two hits on a cruiser.

The group briefly returned to the Eastern Front at Kalinivka. It fought around Cherkasy and in the Second battle of Kiev. It moved to Vinnitsa on 4 January 1944 and then to Lublin four days later and attacked Soviet spearheads around Zhytomyr On 6 February 1944 it was re-designated III./KG 3.

=== Defence of the Reich, Steinbock, Western Front ===
I./KG 51 was based at Lechfled and Memmingen from 6 to 30 August 1943. It flew its first intercept mission over Stuttgart on 6 September. It moved to Horsching in Austria on 9 September and received Göring on 11 October, and he relieved the commanding officer form his duties. The crews contested the Second Raid on Schweinfurt but nearly all its Me 410s were damaged. The group moved its units to France on 6 December to act as night fighters. Most crews had not been trained in night flying although it had 40 aircraft with 24 ready and 36 crews at Dreux, St. Andre and Evreux. III./KG 51 conversion to the Me 410 was not completed and the group temporarily disbanded on 31 December 1943.

The unit took part in the latter part of the Western Front campaign and the Defence of the Reich battles. A notable success was a night intruder operation over England. On 22 April 1944, the United States Army Air Force (USAAF) 1st Bombardment Division and 3rd Bombardment Division were returning to England in darkening skies after a daylight raid over Germany. They were attacked by an element of Messerschmitt Me 410 bomber destroyers over their bases. Over the next twenty minutes, 10 aircraft, nine of them B-24 Liberators, were shot down and 61 men killed for the loss of only two Me 410s and four airmen.

Staffeln of I. and II./KG 51 were involved in Operation Steinbock, revenge bombing attacks against Greater London from January to May 1944. II./KG 51 which had been renamed III./KG 3, was reformed using V./KG 2. It was based at Gilze-Rijen and later moved to Soesterberg in the Netherlands under IX Fligerkorps, attacked to Luftflotte 3. It lost five Me 410s on the night of 22/23 February. Some aircraft stayed in France as night fighter units but the group was withdrawn to Schwabisch-Hall on 15 August as the front in Normandy collapsed. I./KG 51 was decimated during Steinbock but flew on the last major raid on London on 18/19 April 1944. It was moved to Lechfeld in Germany on 25 May 1944.

I./KG 51 began a rapid conversion to the Messerschmitt Me 262. Some pilots of 3 staffel were combat ready and sent to France as Einsatzkommando 51 on 20 July. It retreated to Creil by 15 August and twelve days later to Juvincourt Airfield. It transited through Chievres in Belgium before arriving in Germany on 30 August. By the start of September it had 38 Me 262s and came under the command of the 3rd Flying Division and Jagdkorps II (2nd Fighter Corps). It lost many aircraft when its base at Rheine was bombed on 14 November and began fighter-bomber operations over Eindhoven on 25 November. It fought in the Battle of the Bulge for which it committed 21 operational machines.

It also flew close support operations during Operation Bodenplatte on 1 January 1945 and had a record 37 operational (from 51 Me 262s) on 10 January at Giebelstadt. It flew bombing sorties around Strasbourg from 10 to 13 January. It flew fighter escort to Arado Ar 234s of III./KG 76 to bomb the bridge during the Battle of Remagen on 7 March. From 13 to 20 March it flew sorties in Alsace. It had just 15 Me 262s (11 operational) under the 16th Flying Division on 9 April. It attacked Bridges on the Danube at Dillingen on 21 April. The group retreated to Munich on 23 April as the French Army overran their bases and surrendered to American forces on 8 May 1945.

Little is known about II./KG 51 operations. It had 48 Me 262s on 10 October and was based around Cologne and Aachen. It flew ground-attack missions in the Battle of Hürtgen Forest and Battle of Bastogne. It flew close support against the British Army advancing on Kleve on 14 February 1945. It moved to Kaiserlautern on 20 March and Nuremberg in April and disbanded on 24 April 1945.

On 20 October 1944 III./KG 51 reformed from I./SKG 10 at Mönchengladbach equipped with the Focke-Wulf Fw 190. It ceased to exist on 14 November when renamed NSGr 20. An Erganzungstaffel (Nacht). III/KG 51 was set up on 18 July 1944 to train pilots in night flying. It was renamed 14./SG 151 on 11 November 1944. Third group was ceased to exist.

== Other KG 51 units ==
IV.(Erg)/KG 51 was formed in July or August 1940 at Schwabisch-Hall as Erganzungsstaffel KG 51. It was expanded to IV Group on 22 March 1941 at Lechfeld. Its main duties were to supply relief, personnel and aircraft. It was ordered to fly raids against Sevastopol in early 1942 and to attack partisans in the Kholm and Yelena unit areas in summer 1942. It bombed the Black Sea ports Tuapse, Novorossisk and Sukhumi from 8 August 1942. From August 1943 it received the 13.(Erg)/KG 2 but lost its 12. Staffel to NJG 7. It had 14 Me 262s, Me 410s, Ju 88s, Bf 109s and Fw 190s at Munich and then Neuberg but fuel shortages curtailed training. It ceased to exist by 29 December 1944 as its squadrons were handed over to other formations, particularly KG 1.

== Commanding officers ==
- Oberst Dr Johann-Volkmar Fisser, 1 May 1939 – 26 March 1940
- Oberst Josef Kammhuber, 26 March 1940 – 3 June 1940 (POW, released)
- Oberst Dr Johann-Volkmar Fisser, 3 June 1940 – 12 August 1940 (KIA)
- Major Hans Bruno Shulz-Heyn, 12 August 1940 – 31 August 1941
- Oberst Paul Koester, 1 September 1941 – 4 July 1942
- Major Wilhelm von Friedeburg, 4 July 1942 – 30 November 1942
- Oberst Heinrich Conrady, 1 December 1942 – 8 January 1943 (KIA)
- Major Fritz-Herbert Dierich, 9 January 1943 – 4 February 1943
- Major Egbert von Frankenberg un Proschlitz, 5 February 1943 – 9 May 1943 (defected to the Soviet Union)
- Major Hanns Heise, 9 May 1943 – 25 February 1944
- Oberstleutnant Wolf-Dietrich Meister, 25 February 1944 – 4 December 1944
- Major Wolfgang Schenck, 5 December 1944 – 31 January 1945
- Oberstleutnant Rudolf Hallensleben, 1 February 1945 – 19 April 1945 (KIA - strafing attack)
- Oberstleutnant Siegfried Barth, 28 April – 8 May 1945

== Notes and references ==
=== Bibliography ===
- Bergström, Christer [in Swedish]; Mikhailov, Andrey (2001). Black Cross / Red Star—The Air War Over the Eastern Front, Volume II, Resurgence January–June 1942. Pacifica, California: Pacifica Military History. ISBN 978-0-935553-51-2.
- Bergström, Christer [in Swedish] (2007a). Barbarossa — The Air Battle: July–December 1941. London: Chevron/Ian Allan. ISBN 978-1-85780-270-2.
- Bergström, Christer [in Swedish] (2007b). Stalingrad — The Air Battle: November 1942 – February 1943. London: Chevron/Ian Allan. ISBN 978-1-85780-276-4.
- Bergström, Christer [in Swedish] (2007c). Kursk – The Air Battle: July 1943. Hinkley: Midland Publishing. ISBN 978-1-903223-88-8.
- Bergström, Christer [in Swedish] (2015). The Battle of Britain: An Epic Conflict Revisited. Oxford, UK: Casemate. ISBN 978-1612-00347-4.
- Brooks, Andrew (2003). Air War Over Russia. London: Ian Allan Publishing Press. ISBN 0-7110-2890-7.
- Bungay, Stephen (2000). The Most Dangerous Enemy: A History of the Battle of Britain. London: Aurom Press. ISBN 978-1-85410-801-2.
- Cull, Brian; Lander, Bruce; Weiss, Heinrich (1999). Twelve Days in May. London: Grub Street Publishing. ISBN 978-1-90230-412-0.
- de Zeng, Henry; Stankey, Douglas; Creek, Eddie (2007). Bomber Units of the Luftwaffe 1933-1945; A Reference Source Volume 1. Surrey: Ian Allan Publishing. ISBN 978-1-85780-279-5.
- Echternkamp, Jörg (2014). Germany and the Second World War Volume IX/II. German Wartime Society 1939–1945: Exploitation, Interpretations, Exclusion. Oxford OUP. ISBN 978-0-19-954296-3.
- Goss, Chris (2011) [2000]. Luftwaffe Fighters and Bombers: The Battle of Britain. London: Stackpole. ISBN 978-0-8117-0749-7.
- Goss, Chris (2010). The Luftwaffe's Blitz: The Inside Story, November 1940—May 1941. Manchester: Crecy. ISBN 978-0-85979-148-9.
- Hayward, Joel (1998). Stopped At Stalingrad: The Luftwaffe and Hitler's Defeat in the East, 1942-1943. University of Kansas: Lawrence. ISBN 978-0-7006-1146-1.
- Hooton, Edward (1994). Phoenix Triumphant: The Rise and Rise of the Luftwaffe. London: Arms & Armour. ISBN 978-1-86019-964-6.
- Hooton, E. R. (1997). Eagle in Flames: The Fall of the Luftwaffe. London: Brockhampton. ISBN 978-1-86019-995-0.
- Hooton, Edward (2007b). Luftwaffe at War; Blitzkrieg in the West 1939 - 1940. London: Ian Allan. ISBN 978-1-85780-272-6.
- Jackson, Robert (1974). Air War Over France, 1939–1940. London: Ian Allan. ISBN 978-0-7110-0510-5.
- James, T.C.G.; Cox, Sebastian (2000). The Battle of Britain. London: Frank Cass. ISBN 978-0-7146-8149-8.
- McLachlan, Ian (2010). Night of the Intruders:First-Hand Accounts Chronicling the Slaughter of Homeward Bound USAAF Mission 311. London: Pen and Sword Books. ISBN 978-1-84884-294-6.
- Mason, Francis (1969). Battle Over Britain. London, UK: McWhirter Twins. ISBN 978-0-901928-00-9.
- Muller, Richard (1992). The German Air War in Russia. New York: Nautical & Aviation Pub Co of America. ISBN 978-1-877-85313-5.
- Parker, Nigel (2013). Luftwaffe Crash Archive: Volume 1: A Documentary History of Every Enemy Aircraft Brought Down Over the United Kingdom, September 1939 – 14 August 1940. London: Red Kite. ISBN 978-1-906592-09-7.
- Parry, Simon (2003). Intruders over Britain: The Luftwaffe Night Fighter Offensive 1940 to 1945. Air Research Publications. ISBN 978-1-87-118716-8.

=== Further reading ===
- Dierich, Wolfgang. Kampfgeschwader "Edelweiss" : The history of a German bomber unit, 1935–45. Ian Allan; London. 1975. ISBN 978-0-7110-0601-0
- Goss, Chris. (2000). The Luftwaffe Bombers' Battle of Britain. Crecy, Manchester. ISBN 0-947554-82-3
- Hooton, E.R. (2007a). Luftwaffe at War: Gathering Storm 1933–1939 Classic Publications. ISBN 1903223717.
- Hooton, E.R. (2016). War over the Steppes: The air campaigns on the Eastern Front 1941–45. Osprey Publishing. ISBN 1472815629
- Mackay, Ron (2003). Heinkel He 111 Ramsbury, Marlborough, Wiltshire, UK: Crowood Press. ISBN 1-86126-576-X.
- Mackay, Ron (2011). The Last Blitz: Operation Steinbock, the Luftwaffe's Last Blitz on Britain – January to May 1944. Red Kite. ISBN 978-0-9554735-8-6
