= Jagdbombergeschwader 32 =

Coordinates: 48.1856°N 10.8611°E

Jagdbombergeschwader 32 (Fighter-Bomber Wing 32) — III —
- Active: 22 July 1958- 31 March 2013
- Country: Germany
- Branch: German Air Force
- Role: Suppression of Enemy Air Defenses
- Part of: 1st Air Force Division (1. Luftwaffendivision)
- Garrison/HQ: Lechfeld Air Base
- Engagements: F-84 Thunderstreak incident Operation Deliberate Force; Operation Allied Force

Commanders
- Current commander: Colonel Stefan Scheibl
- Notable commanders: Siegfried Barth

Aircraft flown
- Attack: Formerly: Republic F-84F Thunderstreak, Lockheed F-104 Starfighter, Panavia Tornado IDS
- Electronic warfare: Present: Panavia Tornado ECR

Jagdbombergeschwader 32 (Fighter-Bomber Wing 32; abbreviated as: JaBoG 32) was a fighter-bomber wing of the German Air Force (Luftwaffe). The wing was based in the south of Germany at Lechfeld Airbase and flew Tornado IDS and Tornado ECR planes in the Suppression of Enemy Air Defenses role.

== History ==
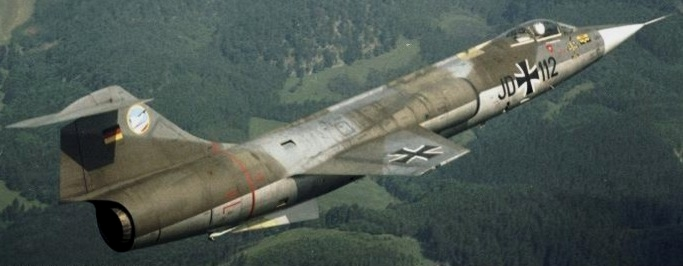
F-104 Starfighter

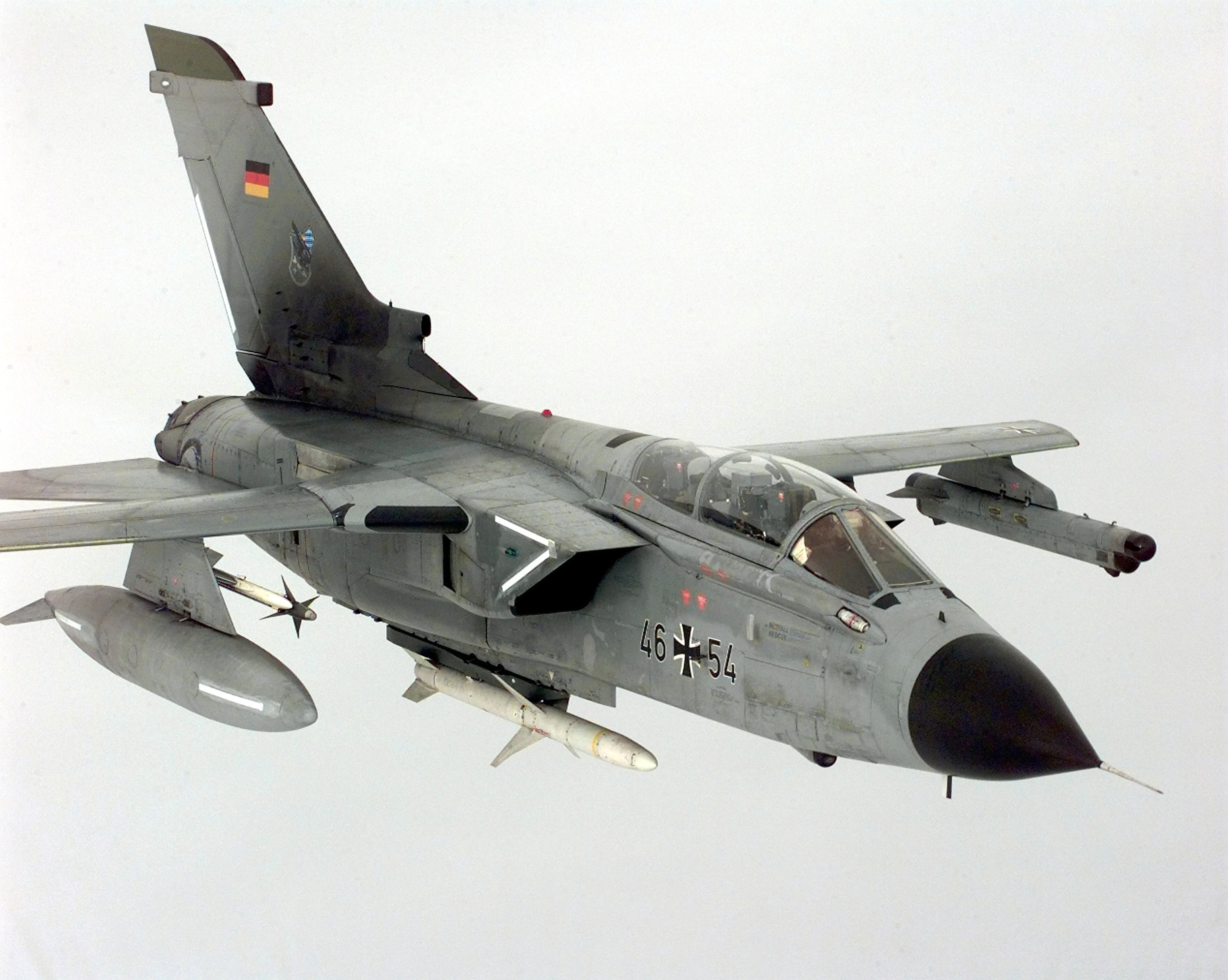
Tornado ECR

The wing was raised in 1957 at Lechfeld Air Base and was officially activated on 22 July 1958, initially equipped with Republic F-84F Thunderstreak fighters. On 14 September 1961, two of its planes mistakenly crossed into East German airspace and were forced to land at the French West Berlin Air Base while being hunted by Soviet fighters. This was a serious diplomatic incident at a time of high tensions, and in answer to the question of what to do with the aircraft, the French secretly buried them on the airfield, a fact not discovered until 1970.

The wing began to receive Lockheed F-104 Starfighters during 1965 and the last Thunderstreak left Lechfeld Air Base on 13 July 1966. In 1984 the wing began its conversion to Panavia Tornado IDS strike fighters. In 1991 the wing was equipped with 35 new Tornado ECR fighters and began its new mission as Germany's only suppression of enemy air defenses (SEAD) capable wing.

On 17 July 1995 Tornado ECRs of JaBoG 32 transferred to San Damiano Air Base in Italy, from where they flew SEAD missions in support of NATOs Operation Deliberate Force over Bosnia and Herzegovina. These were the first combat operations for the German Armed Forces since World War II.

From 24 March to 11 June 1999 JaBoG 32 participated in NATOs Operation Allied Force against Yugoslavia. The Tornado ECRs carrying AGM-88 HARM missiles escorted allied aircraft over Yugoslavian territory to neutralize hostile air defense threats. A total of 236 HARM missiles were fired by JaBoG 32 during the campaign.

In 2008 the first German female combat pilot, Ulrike Flender, joined JaBoG 32. In October 2011 the German Federal Ministry of Defence announced a reorganisation/reduction of the German Armed Forces. As a result of this reorganisation, the wing was disbanded on 31 March 2013, with personnel and planes joining the 1st Squadron of Aufklärungsgeschwader 51 (Reconnaissance Wing 51).
