= Teioasa =

Neighborhood in Bălți

- Neighborhood
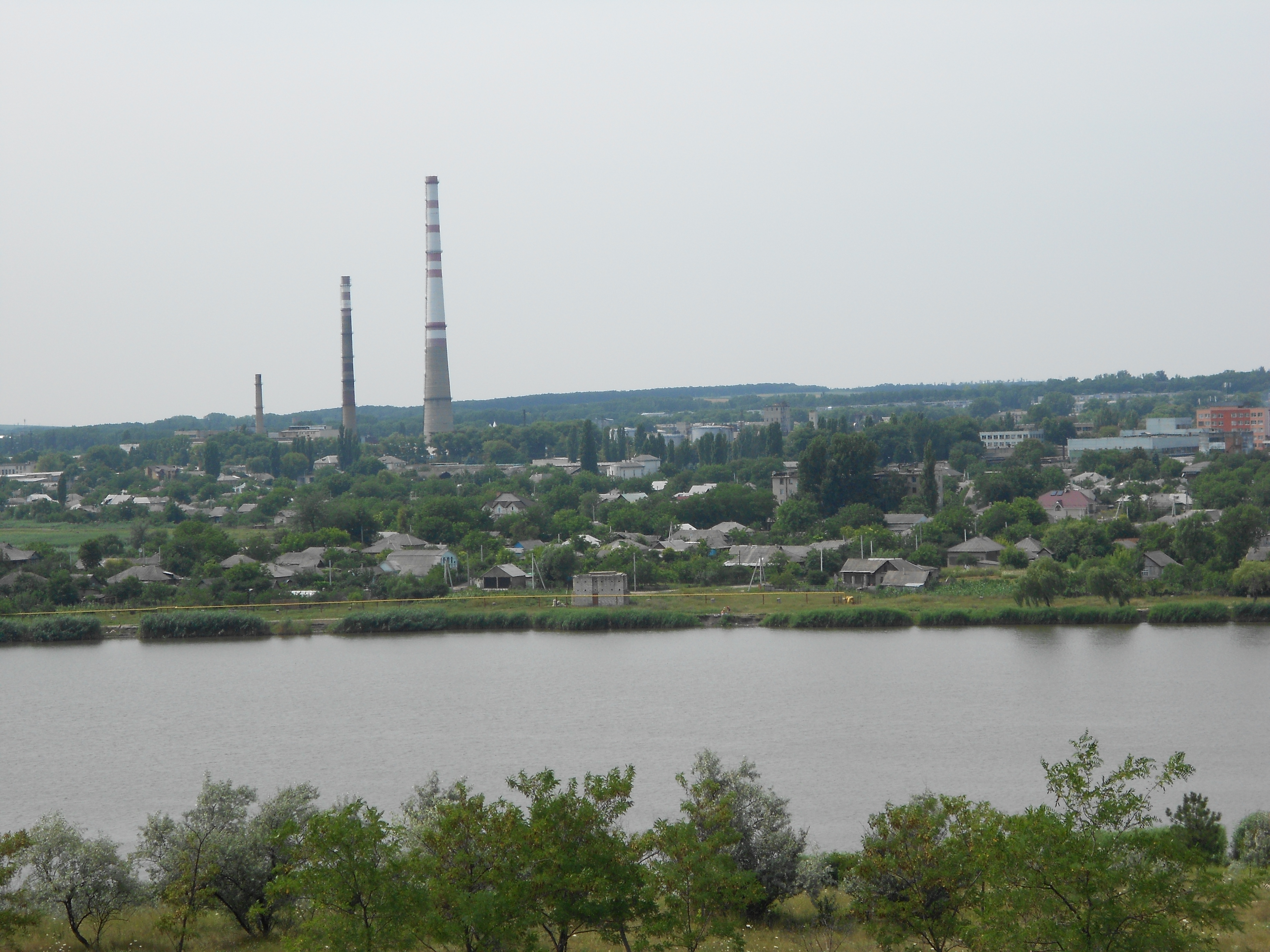
- A Teioasa landscape from the southern edge of city lake

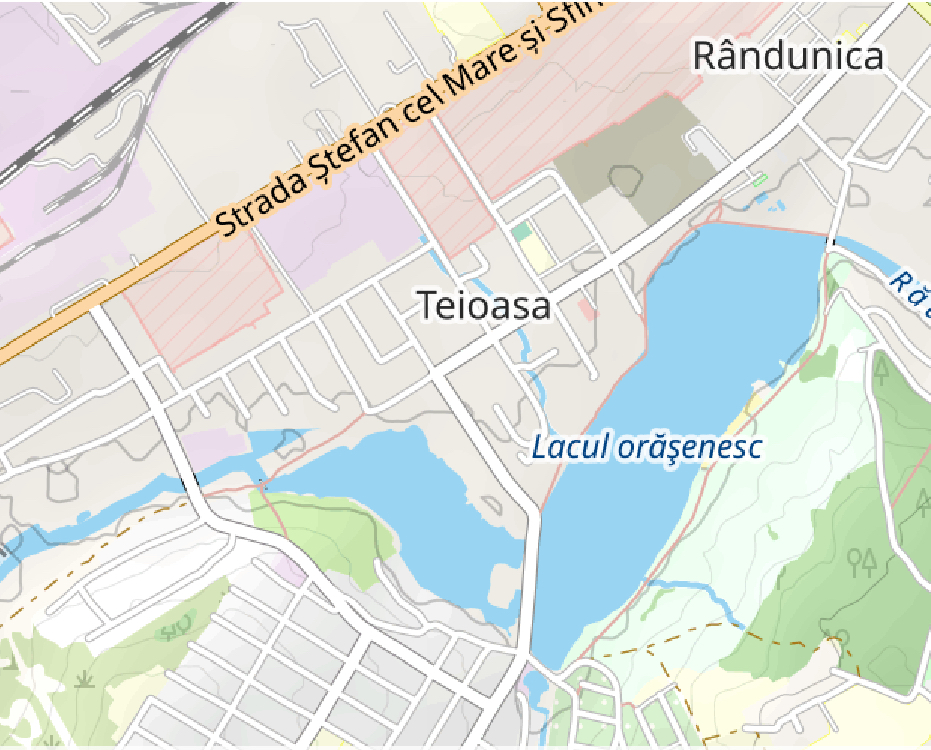
- Location in Bălți
- Interactive map of Teioasa
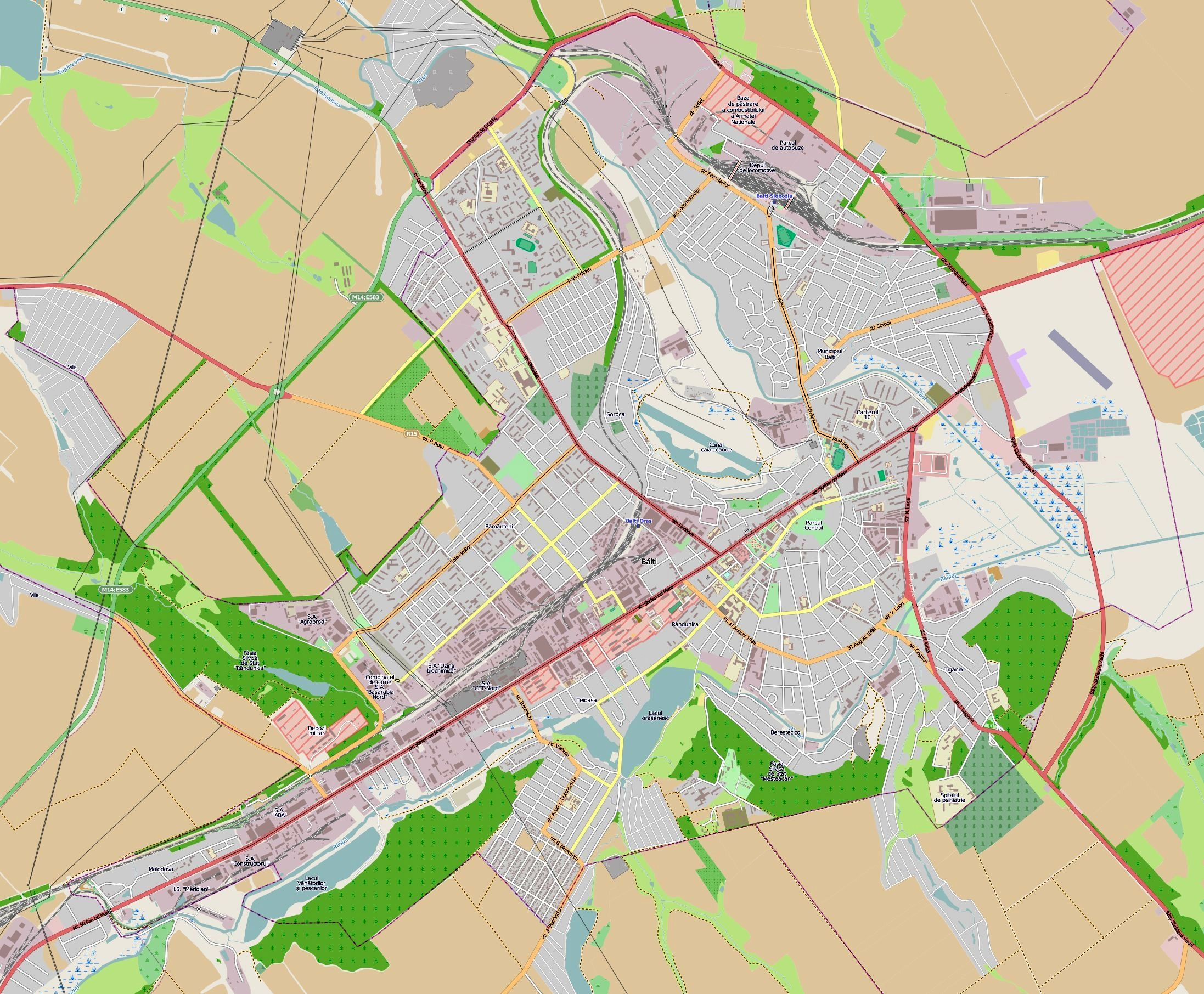
- Location in Bălți
- Coordinates: 47°44′53″N 27°54′22″E
- Country: Moldova
- District: Bălți
- Time zone: UTC+2 (Eastern European Time)
  - Summer (DST): UTC+2 (EET)
- ZIP Codes: 3121

Teioasa (in Polish: Tiosy, in Russian: Тейосы, in Ukrainian: Тіоси) is a district in the municipality of Bălți, Republic of Moldova. It is located between the city lake, the central district of Bălți, and the industrial zone that runs parallel to Ștefan cel Mare Street. The borders of the district are marked by the Veterinary Clinic (Municipal Directorate for Food Safety), the CET-Nord thermoelectric plant, and the neighborhood of Bălții Noi.

Teioasa was founded at the beginning of the 20th century by several Polish families from Galicia, who formed a small rural settlement.

Also located in Teioasa was the first airfield in Bălți, known as the Bălți Aerodrome, positioned along the northeastern edge of the future city lake.

The district includes several grocery stores; a branch of the Linia H2O company specializing in sanitary technical equipment, ceramic tiles, and furniture for bathrooms and kitchens; and Gymnasium No. 9.
