= RAF Bibury =

RAF Bibury
- Near Bibury, Gloucestershire in England
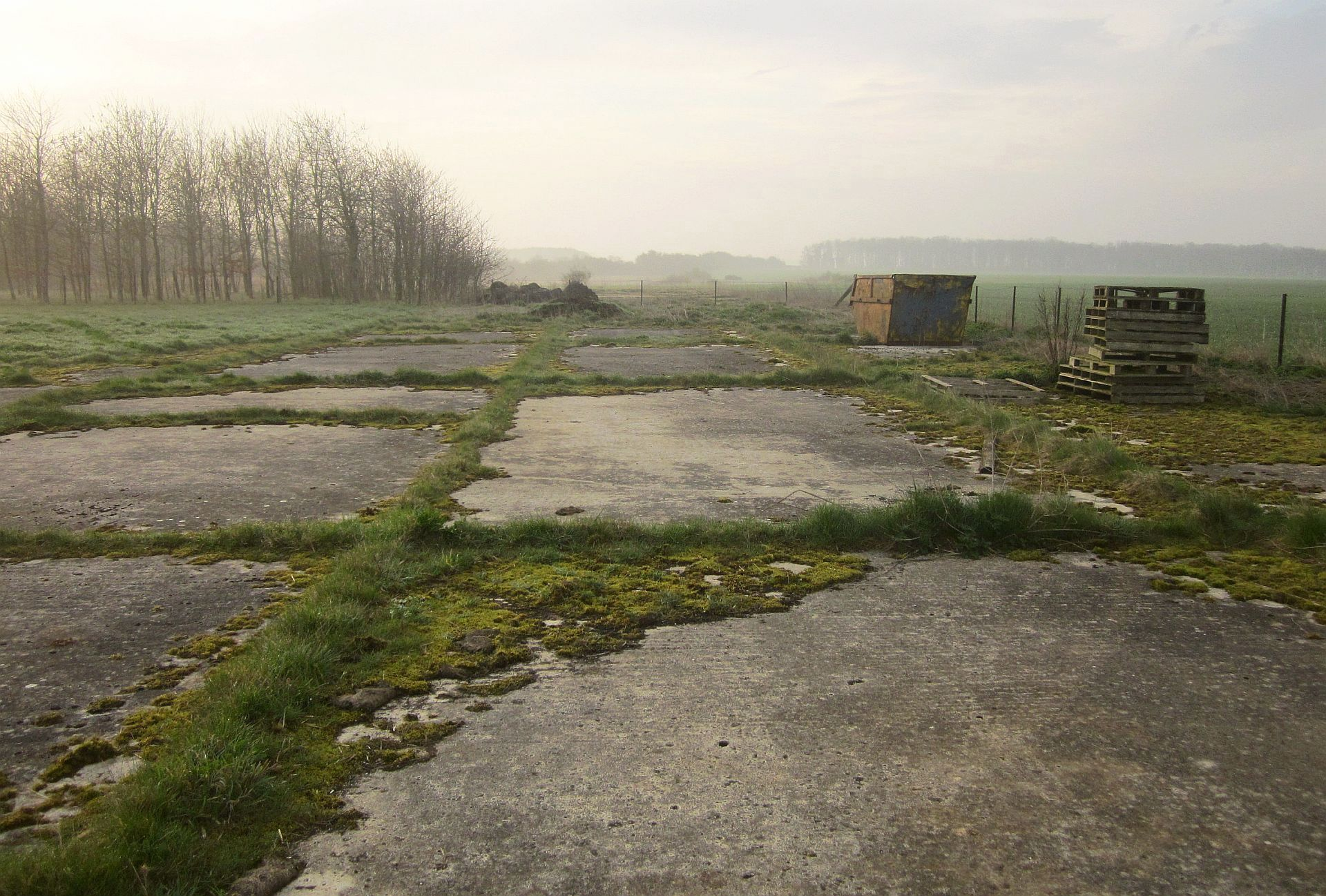
- Part of RAF Bibury in 2015

Site information
- Type: Royal Air Force satellite station
- Owner: Air Ministry
- Operator: Royal Air Force
- Controlled by: RAF Flying Training Command; RAF Fighter Command

Location
- Coordinates: 51°46′53″N 01°50′10″W

Site history
- Built: 1939
- In use: 1940–1945
- Battles/wars: European theatre of World War II

Royal Air Force Bibury or more simply RAF Bibury is a former Royal Air Force satellite station located north east of Cirencester, Gloucestershire, England.

== History ==
The airfield was built in 1939 for use as a relief landing ground for training aircraft from nearby RAF South Cerney. In the Battle of Britain the airfield was used to base detachments of fighter aircraft. Hawker Hurricanes of 87 Squadron arrived on detachment in August 1940. They were replaced by a detachment from 92 Squadron with the Supermarine Spitfire until September when the 87 Squadron detachment returned until the end of the year. During the Battle of Britain the airfield had very few buildings and a grass runway. The airfield was not used for flying after 1944 and was the base of a maintenance unit until it closed in 1945.

The following units were here at some point:

- No. 3 (Pilots) Advanced Flying Unit RAF
- No. 3 Service Flying Training School RAF
- No. 7 Maintenance Unit RAF
- No. 1539 (Beam Approach Training) Flight RAF
