= Werner Panitzki =

German Air Force general

- Born: 27 May 1911; Kiel, German Empire
- Died: 2 June 2000 (aged 89)
- Military career
- Allegiance: Nazi Germany; Germany
- Branch: Luftwaffe; German Air Force
- Service years: World War II; Cold War
- Rank: Generalleutnant
- Commands: Inspector of the Air Force; CS Air Force Staff; CS Armed Forces Staff; 4th Air Defence Division

Generalleutnant Werner Panitzki (27 May 1911 – 2 June 2000) was a German Air Force general. He was Inspector of the Air Force, the senior air force appointment, from 1962 to 1966.

On 25 August 1966, Federal Minister of Defence Kai-Uwe von Hassel dismissed Panitzki, at his own request, because Panitzki in an interview had characterized the procurement of the Lockheed F-104 Starfighter fighter aircraft as a "purely political decision".

== Biography ==
=== Second World War ===
A pilot in the Luftwaffe during World War II Panitzki served in Kampfgeschwader 51 until a plane crash during the Balkans Campaign that caused injuries that resulted in his dismissal as a pilot and reassignment as a staff officer.

Taken prisoner as the end of the war, Panitzki was released in 1947 and became a businessman in Kiel.

=== Post-war career ===
In 1952 Panitzki joined Amt Blank the predecessor of the Federal Ministry of Defense which oversaw the early West German Rearmament process.

In 1955 Panitzki joined the newly formed Bundeswehr with the rank of Colonel. Soon after he was promoted to Brigadier General and in 1957 made the deputy to the Inspector of the Air Force General Josef Kammhuber. During this time he also briefly served as the first Chief of Staff of the Command Staff of the Air Force from June 1 to July 14, 1957.

After his promotion to major general he was appointed as commander of Luftwaffendivision Nord. In October 1962 Panitzki was promoted to Lieutinant General and made the second Inspector of the Air Force.

His tenure as inspector coincided with the high loss of life among German pilots due to accidents while flying the Lockheed F-104 Starfighter which earned the craft the nickname Witwenmacher ("widowmaker"). He also advocated for the expansion of the German built and used Beja Airport located in Portugal which he did not think had been fully utilized.

On 25 August 1966 Panitzki was dismissed, at his own request, by Federal Minister of Defence Kai-Uwe von Hassel because of comments made by him during an interview about the procurement of the F-104 Starfighter where he said the purchase was a “purely political decision”.

After his retirement, Panitzki was awarded the Knight Commander's Cross of the Order of Merit of the Federal Republic of Germany in 1967 for his services.

== Awards ==
- - Knight Commander's Cross of the Order of Merit of the Federal Republic of Germany (1967)

Military offices
Preceded by General Josef Kammhuber	Inspector of the Air Force; 1 October 1962 – 25 August 1966	Succeeded by Generalleutnant Johannes Steinhoff
