= Wolfgang Schenck (pilot) =

Luftwaffe fighter ace

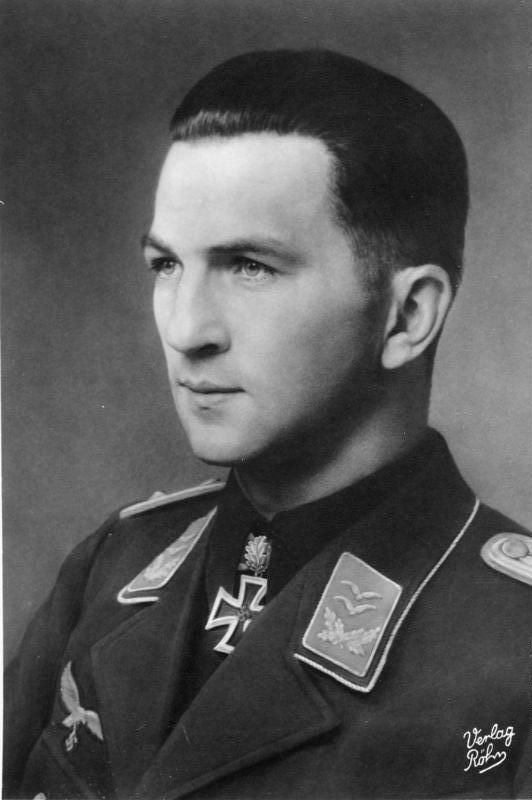
- Wolfgang Schenck, 1942
- Born: 7 February 1913; Windhoek, German South West Africa
- Died: 5 March 2010 (aged 97); Marburg, Germany
- Military career
- Allegiance: Nazi Germany; Germany
- Branch: Luftwaffe
- Service years: 1936–1945
- Rank: Oberstleutnant
- Units: SKG 210, ZG 1
- Commands: KG 51
- Conflicts: World War II
- Awards: Knight's Cross of the Iron Cross with Oak Leaves

Wolfgang Schenck (7 February 1913 – 5 March 2010) was a Luftwaffe fighter ace and recipient of the Knight's Cross of the Iron Cross with Oak Leaves during World War II. He was born in Windhoek in German South West Africa (now Namibia). Wolfgang Schenck was an important figure in the Luftwaffe's development of the fighter-bomber, as well as pioneering work in the use of the Me 262 jet-bomber.

== Early life ==
Wolfgang 'Bombo' Schenck, was born on 7 February 1913 in Windhoek, German South West Africa, the son of a farmer. On the death of his mother in 1923, Wolfgang and his sister moved back to Germany to live with family in Berlin. In 1934 he returned to South West Africa to work on a coffee plantation.

== Career ==
By this time he held a 'C' gliding flying certificate and an 'A' certificate for powered flight. He entered the military in December 1936 as an officer-cadet, and in 1938 posted to II./JG 132 'Richthofen' at Jüterbog-Damm Airfield in Jüterbog. This unit was renamed I. Gruppe of Zerstörergeschwader 1 (ZG 1—1st Destroyer Wing) and it was with 1. Staffel that Schenck took part in the Polish campaign during September 1939, and in the Norwegian campaign during spring 1940.

He scored his first aerial victory on 11 May 1940, but on 16 May, he was seriously wounded in combat with Royal Air Force (RAF) Hurricanes, but managed to return to base. After months in hospital Schenck tried to rejoin his old Staffel. He established that 1./ZG 1 was now 1. Staffel, Erprobungsgruppe 210 (Erpr.Gr. 210). Accordingly, he travelled to their base at Denain, France on 4 September and arranged with Gruppenkommandeur (group commander) Oberleutnant Martin Lutz to join 1./Erpr. Gr. 210. Wolfgang Schenck took up the post of Group Adjutant on 5 September.

On 27 September Lutz was lost in action, and Generalfeldmarschall Albert Kesselring visited Denain on 1 October 1940, and appointed Werner Weymann as acting Gruppenkommandeur and Schenck was appointed Staffelkapitän (squadron leader) of 1. Staffel and promoted to Oberleutnant.

Weymann was shot down into the Channel on 5 October, and Schenck was now acting 'Gruppenführer' (Group leader) of Erpr.Gr.210. The new Gruppenkommandeur, Major Karl-Heinz Lessmann from II./ZG 2, was posted in on 1 November although Schenck's superior knowledge of the use of the Bf 110 as a fighter-bomber meant Schenck led most missions.

In mid-1941 the unit was re-designated I. Gruppe, Schnellkampfgeschwader 210 and moved east to prepare for the attack on Russia. Schenck had flown over 50 fighter-bomber missions and continued to lead 1. Staffel once the campaign in the East started, and was awarded the Knight's Cross of the Iron Cross on 14 August 1941 after 9 aerial victories. He then spent a spell at Rechlin as head of the Eprobungsstaffel Me 210, and in January 1942 he returned to ZG 1, as Gruppenkommandeur of I./ZG 1, by which time he had claimed 18 aerial victories in 300 operational missions as well numerous claims for the destruction of enemy shipping, tanks and transport in the months of the Russian campaign.

Schenck moved to a German Air Ministry staff position in August 1942. He was awarded the Eichenlaub (Oak Leaves) to the Knight's Cross on 30 October 1942, and in January 1943 was appointed Geschwaderkommodore of Schlachtgeschwader 1 in the Mediterranean theatre, flying the Focke-Wulf Fw 190 fighter-bomber. In December 1943 he was again wounded in combat. Hospitalisation followed and on release he was appointed as 'Inspizient der Schlachtflieger'.

In June 1944 Oberstleutnant Schenck was given responsibility for evaluating the Messerschmitt Me 262 as a fighter-bomber, and formed a specialist unit for this purpose, Kommando Schenck. His next posting was as Geschwaderkommodore of Kampfgeschwader 51, then converting to the Me 262. His final appointment was Inspector for Jet fighters from February 1945 to the war's end.

Schenck had flown over 400 combat missions, 40 in the Me 262.

== Later life and death ==
Post-war he returned to South Africa and took up bush flying, accumulating over 17,000 hours flying time. He returned to Germany and settled in Marburg.

He died on March 5, 2010, in Marburg, Germany.

== Awards ==
- Iron Cross (1939)
  - 2nd Class (23 September 1939)
  - 1st Class (25 May 1940)
- Ehrenpokal der Luftwaffe (22 December 1940)
- Knight's Cross of the Iron Cross with Oak Leaves
  - Knight's Cross on 14 August 1941 as Oberleutnant and Staffelkapitän of the 1./SKG 210
  - 139th Oak Leaves on 30 October 1942 as Hauptmann and Gruppenkommandeur of the I./ZG 1

Military offices
Preceded by Oberstleutnant Wolf Dietrich Meister	Commander of Kampfgeschwader 51 "Edelweiss"; 5 December 1944 – 1 February 1945	Succeeded by Oberstleutnant Rudolf Hallensleben
