= Kampfgeschwader 100 =

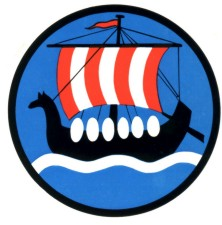
- Emblem of KG 100
- Active: 29 November 1941–2 February 1945
- Country: Nazi Germany
- Branch: Luftwaffe
- Type: Bomber wing
- Role: Air interdiction close air support Offensive counter air Maritime interdiction Strategic bombing Pioneering precision-guided munition deployment
- Size: Air Force Wing
- Nickname: Wiking (viking)
- Equipment: Dornier Do 217; Heinkel He 111; Heinkel He 177
- Engagements: World War II

Commanders
- Notable commanders: Bernhard Jope

Insignia
- Identification symbol: Geschwaderkennung of 6N

Kampfgeschwader 100 (KG 100) was a Luftwaffe medium and heavy bomber wing of World War II and the first military aviation unit to use a precision-guided munition (the Fritz X anti-ship glide bomb) in combat to sink a warship (the Italian battleship Roma) on 9 September 1943.

== History ==
KG 100 was created from Kampfgruppe 100, a specialist pathfinder unit formed on 26 August 1938 as Luftnachrichten Abteilung 100 at Köthen. On 18 November 1939 it was renamed K.Gr. 100.

It was the first unit to use Y-Verfahren (Y-Control) navigation aids. It spent the inter-war years training on high-altitude flights to North Africa, the Eastern Mediterranean and northern Finland. K.Gr. 100 participated in all of the continental campaigns from 1939 to 1941, in medium bomber and maritime interdiction operations.

Stab./KG 100 was formed on 29 November 1941 at Châtres, France and placed under the command of Oberst Heinz-Ludwig von Holleben. The formation process was slow and not complete until April 1942. The Stab. unit did not possess more than one aircraft at a time.

I./KG 100 was formed on 15 December 1941 at Märkisch-Friedland, equipped with the Heinkel He 111H-6. I. Gruppe was transferred to Focșani, in Romania with 28 bombers under the command of Luftflotte 4 on 12 January 1942. Major Helmut Küster was the group's first Gruppenkommandeur.

II./KG 100 was formed at Seshchinskaya near Roslavl by renaming III./KG 26. Major Horst Röbling took command at its founding on 15 December.

III./KG 100 was formed at Athens-Kalamaki and Athens-Eleusis on 20 September 1942 under the command of Major Hans Schulz.

== World War II ==
=== Crimea, Black Sea, Northern Caucasus ===
I./KG 100 was dispatched to the Crimea and operated exclusively on the front of Army Group South of the Eastern Front until March 1943. On 26 December 1941, the Red Army landed at Kerch and on 30 December executed another amphibious landing near Feodosiya with the 44th and 51st Armies. The operation was to drive to Sevastopol and relieve the garrison, encircled by the German 11th Army. The ensuing Battle of the Kerch Peninsula lasted until May 1942.

I./KG 100 flew its first mission from Romanian soil on 16 January 1942. It relocated to the Crimea, at Saki on 30 January, after a brief stay at Kirovograd in Ukraine, and began operations over the Black Sea and Sea of Azov. It was placed under the command of Wolfgang von Wild's Fliegerfuhrer Ostsee (Flying Command Eastern Sea) which was responsible for all anti-shipping operations. KG 100 was expected to assist in the destruction of the powerful Black Sea Fleet supplying the Soviet beachheads. The group was in no condition for sustained operations. The chronic shortage of aircraft on the front lines left only eight He 111s serviceable. The crews were trained only in minelaying and not anti-shipping operations.

On the group's first operation it lost a bomber to a Soviet fighter attack over the Kerch Strait: the Red Air Force (VVS) was active over the sea-lanes. The exploits of one particular pilot—Staffelkapitän of 8. Staffel Hansgeorg Bätcher—prevented KG 100's presence from passing without note. Commander of Luftflotte 4 demanded all supply ships be destroyed. When a 7,500–ton ship was spotted bringing in fuel, Alexander Löhr ordered its destruction. Bätcher attempted an attack but was driven off by heavy anti-aircraft artillery. Flying out-to-sea, he returned, throttled back the engines in order not to alert the Soviets by their sound, and made an attack, releasing his bombs without the use of his bomb aimer. A SC500 bomb struck amidships and destroyed the tanker without experiencing return fire. The ship was likely Emba, destroyed at Kamysh-Burun, seven miles south of Kerch. An exact date and place of the mission is not known as the pages of Bätcher's logbook are missing.

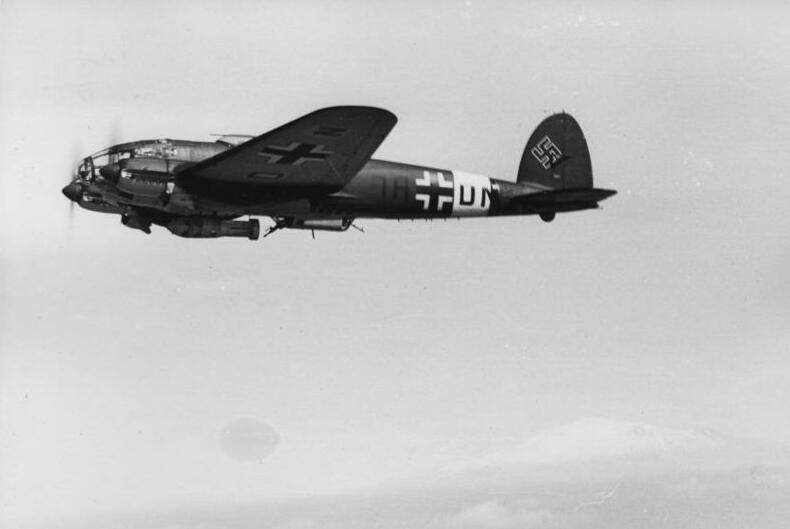
He 111 with a SC1000 bomb. KG 100 used these against Sevastopol.

KG 100 accomplished little else because of adverse weather conditions. The torpedo-equipped KG 26 was brought in to increase German air power. The Black Sea Fleet transported 100,000 men and hundreds of artillery pieces to Kerch between 20 January and 11 February. At Sevastopol, 764 short tons (693 t) of fuel, 1,700 short tons (1,500 t) of supplies were sent to the port. On 13 February, the cruiser Komintern and destroyer Shaumyan brought in 1,034 soldiers and 200 tons of supplies. The cruiser Krasny Krym and destroyer Dzerzhinskiy brought in a further 1,075 men on 14 February. The next day, the minesweeper T410 brought in 650 and evacuated 152. On 17 February, the transport Belostok brought in 871 men. The Black Sea Fleet regularly shelled German positions on the coast. The Luftwaffe increased its pressure, dispatching KG 27, KG 55, and KG 100 to bomb the ports at Anapa, Tuapse, and Novorossiysk on the Caucasian Black Sea coast. On 20 February, the 1,900 long tons (1,900 t) transport Kommunist was sunk by Bätcher.

I./KG 100 lost one bomber with 16 damaged in air raids on Saki on 19 February. It bombed Sevastopol on 3 March and carried out mining and ship attacks off the city, and Kerch, throughout March. In February and March 1942 the German air units began to take a heavy toll on Soviet shipping. Soviet fighter resistance claimed one bomber from I./KG 100 on 16 and 17 March despite protection by III./JG 77 on both missions. The first loss was attributed to the 27 IAP regiment from the VVS Crimean Front. KG 100 moved to VIII. Fliegerkorps commanded by Wolfram Freiherr von Richthofen from 7 June to 2 July. The group took part in huge bombing operations over Sevastopol, which began on 2 June, five days before Erich von Manstein, 11th Army commander, began the offensive against the city. With StG 77 and KG 76, the group dropped 570 tons of bombs and 500 SC50 bombs. The attack units of Luftflotte 4 dropped 2,264 tons of bombs and 23,800 incendiary bombs in 3,069 sorties. Some individual crews flew up to 18 missions on this day.

Eight days into the air offensive, Leutnant Herbert Klein scored a direct hit on the 4,727-ton Abkhaziya which exploded and sank. The rest of the group sank the destroyer Svobodnyy. On 26 June the supply ship Tashkent evaded I./KG 100's attacks but the escorting destroyer Bezuprechnyy was sunk by StG 77. StG 77 and KG 100 proceeded to chase Tashkent for four hours. Commander Vasiliy Yeroshenko rushed around the bridge observing the dive-bomber attacks and calling out orders for evasive action. After 335 bombs had been dropped, the ship was damaged but escaped with 2,100 wounded soldiers on board. In the following days, KG 100 returned to the port and crews reported mass destruction of entire streets with the use of heavy bombs.

On 1 July I./KG 100, with StG 77 and I./KG 76, bombed ports at Anapa, Tuapse, and Novorossiysk. For one loss they sank the destroyer leader Tashkent, the destroyer Bditelny and the transports Ukrania, Proletariy and Elbrus. The salvage vessel Chernomor, schooner Dnestr, a patrol and two torpedo boats were also destroyed. The minelayer Komintern, the destroyers Soobrazitelny and Nezamozhnik, the patrol vessels Shkval and Shtom, a gunboat, one torpedo boat and two other transports were also damaged. Bätcher flew his 300th sortie on 2 July against the remaining pockets of Soviet resistance in Sevastopol. KG 100 dropped about 2000 tons of bombs in 1,339 sorties in support of the Sevastopol siege during June 1942.

=== Stalingrad, Caspian Sea, central and southern sectors ===
After the fall of the port city, KG 100 continued Black Sea operations. With II./KG 26 it damaged Gnevny-class destroyer Bodny in Poti harbour. The guard ship Shtorm was severely damaged also. The attack cost them two He 111s and another four destroyed; three were damaged in July in continuous attacks. At the beginning of August, I./KG 100 had developed into an experienced anti-shipping group. Richthofen, who had lost I./KG 100 to Fliegerfuhrer Ostsee after 2 July, requested the group to rejoin Fliegerkorps VIII near Stalingrad. The group was ordered to attack shipping along the Volga River and the group did do, north and south of the city as a prelude to the Battle of Stalingrad. KG 100 dropped magnetic mines and high explosive bombs. Fifteen percent of the mines detonated upon contact with the water. II./KG 26 crews released 31 mines on 27 July. The group had minor successes—they damaged two large transport barges under tow, sank a floating crane and two other barges. On 4 August they gave up mining but dropped 28 on this final day. The Volga was too shallow, and bombs were preferred in any case.

KG 100 supported the slow push into Stalingrad. On 23 August 1942 it was involved the enormous air bombardment of the city over the course of three days. On 8 September 1942 the group ran into Yakovlev Yak-1s from the 520 IAP on a transfer flight as the bombers approached their target at Kamyshin. Adolf Büsge's crew were subjected to a taran attack by Boris Gomolko. Three bombers were reported lost. For the duration of September, the group participated in daily bombing operations over the city. By the 20th it had 20 of 27 bombers combat ready. On 6 October it moved to Saky in the Crimea. From there it attacked shipping in Tuapse harbour and oil facilities at Grozny from 6–12 October. It moved to Stalino on 13 October. It transferred to Armavir in the northern Caucasus on 22 October.

In September and October KG 100 remained on anti-shipping duties. In October 1942 it began supporting the eastward-most advance. It began bombing operations against Astrakhan and bombed Soviet ships on the Caspian Sea. On 26 October Hansgeorg Bätcher sank a ship in the Caspian after six attacks against it in the same mission. A SC250 was seen to hit the forecastle and the vessel began to burn. The attack was his 400th mission. Another three freighters and tanker were claimed destroyed in the night. On 27/28 October 1942, the group bombed the city of Astrakhan at night, while two freighters were claimed destroyed and five damaged in the Caspian Sea. I./KG 100 claimed two tankers on 29/30 October four tankers and five freighters were damaged by bombs. Other bombers attacked the rail lines and claimed 13 trains destroyed. The first German loss over the Caspian Sea occurred on 31 October/1 November when Unteroffizier Hans Zebhe failed to return from a night sortie. By this time I./KG 100 had no more than seven operational He 111s. On 15 November 1942 Leutnant Herbert Kuntz's crew scored a bomb hit on a 1,300 GRT transport ship. The attack marked the end of Luftwaffe operations over the Caspian Sea.

On 19 November 1942 the Red Army began Operation Uranus, which encircled the German 6th Army in Stalingrad KG 100 began to support the defense of the Chir River on 24 November. It began flying supply operations into the Oblinskaya and Kalach the following day, and to Stalingrad through December. On 23 December they carried out heavy close air support attacks on the Soviet encirclement to assist Operation Winter Storm. The wing withdrew westward on 2 January 1943 and attacked Soviet armour on the Don River on 13 January. The last supply operation to the pocket was carried out on 26 January. Twenty-four hours later I./KG 100 moved to Saky in the Crimea to refit. The remaining aircraft were handed over to KG 55 and KG 100 moved to Lviv for conversion on to the He 111H-16.

In March 1943 the group moved to Salon, in southern France and re-equipped with the Lotfernrohr 7D on 2 April. I./KG 100 was based at Stalino from 24 April. It restarted mining and anti-shipping operations over the lower Volga on 13 May. It moved to Seshchinskaya to begin bombing operations against the Molotov tank factory in the Gorki area. Operations began on 1 June 1943. On 7 June it bombed oil refineries and ball bearing factories in Saratov before returning to Stalino to carry out long-range bombing operations over the Caspian Sea, from 7 to 20 June. The 4/5 June operation was carried out by 128 He 111s and Junkers Ju 88 from III./KG 1, KG 3, II and III./KG 4, KG 27, I./KG 100 and II. and III./KG 55 dropped 179 tons of bombs against the No. 1 Molotov plant. Many workshops of wooden construction caught fire. The water-supply was severed and large parts of the plant burned. The blacksmiths, chassis, main conveyor, and spring workshops were destroyed. Living compounds and a child's nursery were also hit. The effect was disastrous for the Soviets. The attackers lost five bombers. The Soviet 1st Air Army, 2nd Air Army and 15th Air Army attacked German airfields on 8 June. JG 51 intercepted, and claimed 40 for one loss.

On 4 July KG 100 moved to Poltava and participated in the Battle of Kursk to 16 July. It flew in support of the Mius River front near Kharkov and Izium in August. The group was particularly active along the front from Konotop and Zaporozhye. From Kirovograd it flew attacks against Soviet bridgeheads at Kremenchug and Zaporozhye in October in midst of the Battle of the Dnieper. I./KG 100 traded identities with I./KG 4 on 21 October 1943. The group was reformed and KG 100 left the Eastern Front.

=== Mediterranean and North Africa ===
II./KG 100 was formed on 15 December 1941. Under the command of Horst Röbling, the Gruppe was moved to Seshchinskaya, south-east of Roslavl. The group was formed from the renaming of III./KG 26. It was handed to Fliegerkorps VIII and began operations on the Moscow sector and flew day and night against the Soviet counter-offensives. It handed over all remaining aircraft to I./KG 28 and transferred to Poix, France to refit on the H-5 and H-6 models. The group practised night attacks and flew on raids against Hull, England on 8 March 1942. The following months, the group was earmarked for the Eastern Front but was moved to southern Europe. On 21 April it was ordered to Athens–Kalamaki, in Greece under the command of X. Fliegerkorps.

From here, the Heinkel He 111s of the group began long-range maritime interdiction operations against ports and shipping off and over Libya in support of Axis operations in the North African Campaign. On 24 April 1942 it flew against British targets in the Libyan Sea and on the night of the 28 April bombed Alexandria harbour, Egypt. In May 1942, operations in the Levantine Sea, against airfields in El Daba, Fuka, Sollum, and support for Axis forces in the Siege of Tobruk. After bombing Alexandria on 3 May it supported the Gazala offensive (26–31 May), and Tobruk on the night of the 1/2 June. The group bombed rail lines from Sidi Barrani and Mersa Matruh on 9 June. In June attacks on airfields and British Army positions predominated but on 14 June it assisted in attacks on the Vigorous convoy. From 8 to 10 July it dropped aerial mines in the Suez while bombing oil tanks along the region from 27 to 31 July.

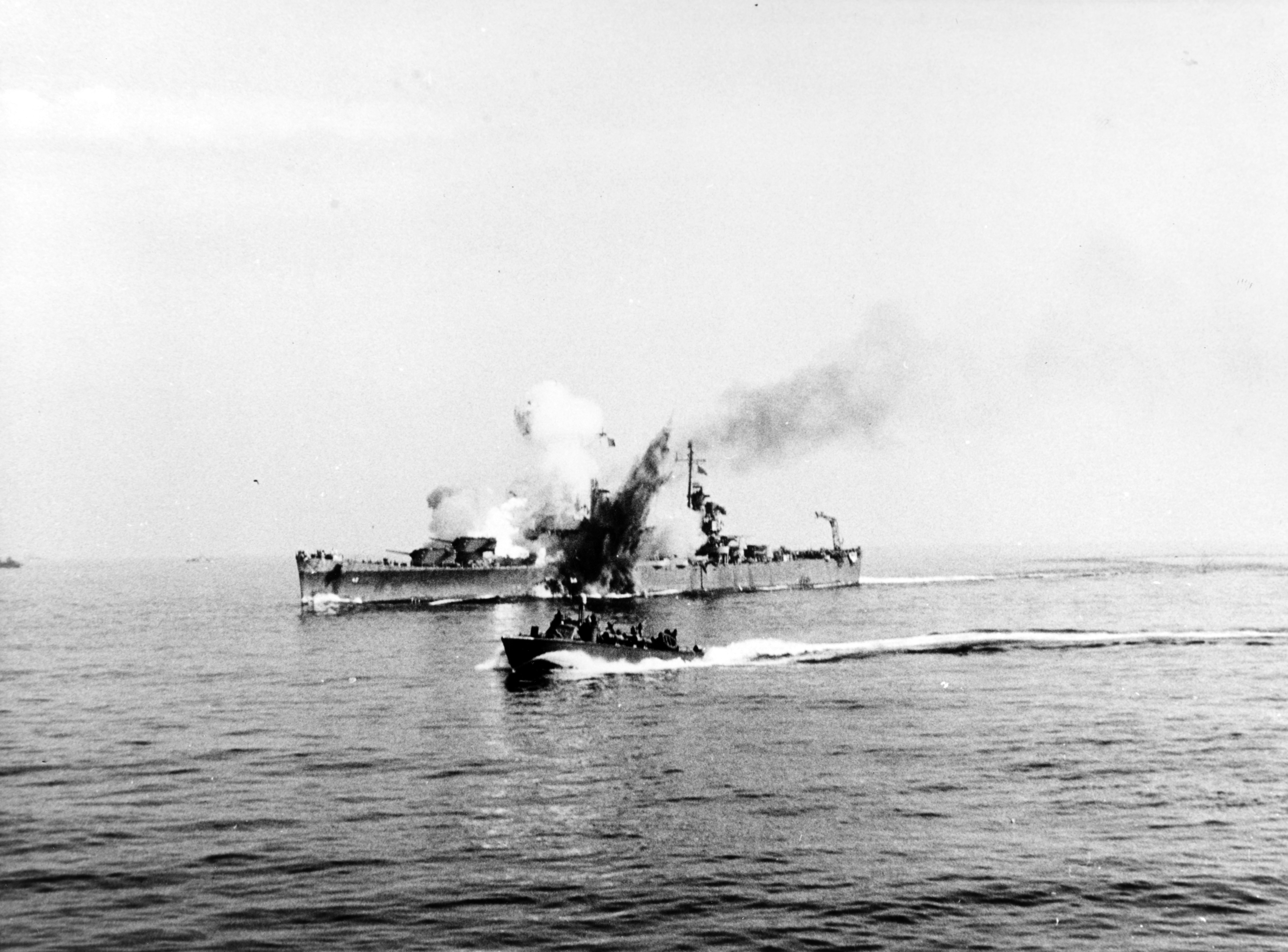
Savannah is hit by a Fritz-X radio-controlled bomb in the KG 100 attack, 11 September 1943

In mid-August it withdrew to Greece to train crews and brought up to strength. At Kalamaki it could field 28 He 111s, with 11 operational on 20 September 1942. It carried out nuisance raids on El Alamein on 26 September but was transferred to Catania, Sicily, on 1 October. Formally placed under the command of II. Fliegerkorps, II./KG 100 assisted in the Siege of Malta. From 12 to 19 October 1942 it flew attacks against Malta airfields. It bombed RAF Luqa on 15 October but lost its commanding officer Major Horst Röbling killed in action. Hermann Diekötter replaced him. The group was moved back to Kalamaki on 23 October, it response to the Second battle of El Alamein. It flew small-scale night attacks until 10 November 1942 when it was recalled to Sicily in response to Operation Torch, and the Anglo-American landings in Morocco, and Algeria. It bombed Algiers on 10/11 November and began attacks on American shipping along the Algerian coast. It bombed Bilda airfield on 28 November and struck at Bône harbour on 4/5 and 5/6 December. To the end of the month it attacked airfields around Benghazi. On 17 December 1942 it flew oil supplies to the German Africa Corps in Tunisia. By the end of 1942, II./KG 100 had 22 (from 32) bombers operational but only four of 17 crews available were fit for action by 31 December. Until 11 March 1943, it carried out attacks on convoys and shipping in the Tripoli and Benghazi vicinity. Some Staffeln were relocated to Belgrade in Yugoslavia to begin Case White against Yugoslav partisans from 5 February to 2 March 1943.

III./KG 100 was formed on 20 September 1942 from the former Aufklärungsgruppe (See) 126. The group was commanded by Hans Schulz. Based at Athens-Kalamaki and then Athens-Eleusis it was subordinated to Fliegerkorps X. It operated the He 111, Arado Ar 96 and Blohm & Voss BV 138. It began by flying convoy escort missions in the Aegean Sea. From late November 1942 to February 1943 it flew from Catania in Sicily. It attacked ports along the Tunisian and Algerian coastlines. A small detachment was sent to Yugoslavia to participate in Case White. On 10 February it received notice to revert to its original identity. The ordered was carried out ten days later.

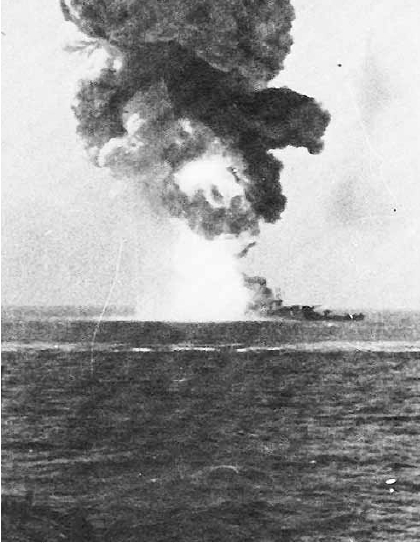
The battleship Roma explodes after being struck by a Fritz-X guided PGM gravity bomb.

III./KG 100 was reformed on 29 April 1943 at Schwäbisch Hall. The K.Gr. 21 was redesignated to form the group. The Dornier Do 217K-2 was made available to the unit. The group was then given specialist training in the use of the Fritz-X guided missile in May and June 1943. Hauptmann Ernst Hetzel was given command on 4 May 1943. II./KG 100 was also trained for use with guided anti-ship missiles. A Einsatzstaffel was left behind at Athens with 17 Ju 88s and He 111s. The group was equipped with the Do 217 and began training with the Henschel Hs 293 missile at Peenemünde. It absorbed the remains of the Erprobungsstaffel/KG 30 bomber wing's service-test squadron, and was declared operational in July 1943. It was deployed to Istres, France on 12 July, to Foggia on 17 July and the main part of the Gruppe was located at Cognac, France on 31 July. It flew no operations for most of August.

III./KG 100 used the Fritz-X for the first time on 21 July against ships in Augusta harbour. The Foggia element withdrew to Istres on 27 July. It bombed ships in Palermo harbour on 1 August and again off Syracuse nine days later. By 20 August 1943 only five of the 30 Do 217s were operational. On 29 August it claimed a British cruiser damaged off Gibraltar. II./KG 100 flew the first PGM ordnance attack in history, using the rocket-boosted Henschel Hs 293 ASM (guided by the same Kehl-Straßurg system as the Fritz X used) off the northern tip of Spain on 25 August and damaged HMS Bideford. Two days later, they sank the sloop Egret—sunk by ''Geschwaderkommodore Auffhammer (who took command on 4 May 1943) and Oberleutnant Paulus—and damaged four escorts. On 9 September 1943 both groups attacked the Salerno beachhead. On 13 September it sank the hospital ship Newfoundland. The same afternoon, 11 Do 217s of III./KG 100, led by commanding officer Bernhard Jope, sank the battleship Roma and damaged Italia. From 10 to 19 September it attacked several freighters. On 16 September the group severely damaged the battleship Warspite and damaged Valiant.

The United States Navy cruiser Savannah was damaged by a Fritz X strike on 11 September and Philadelphia, and Uganda were also damaged on 17 September. III./KG 100 assisted in the attack on Savannah. Royal Navy destroyers Loyal and Nubian were damaged. On 30 September II./KG 100 sank two landing craft in Ajaccio harbour Corsica, while 5. Staffel was sent to help recapture the Dodecanese Islands. In October the Einsatzstaffel lost eight aircraft in bombing raids on Athens and Eleusis airfields. There were operational problems with missiles that responded erratically and sabotage was suspected. The main body of the group transferred to Toulouse on 4 November and bombed Naples harbour on 5/6 November. The Einsatzstaffel was disbanded on 10 November. It attacked convoy KMS 31 off Oran, claiming several sinkings. 5. Staffel sank HMS Rockwood and Dulverton, on 11 and 13 November.

II./KG 100 rested and re-equipped in Schleswig-Holstein. It began to prepare for Operation Carmen, a proposed attack on Scapa Flow on 19 November 1943. The group returned to Toulouse and Blagnac following the cancellation of the attack. 4. Staffel remained, to convert to the Heinkel He 177 from 9 December. Records show that the first operation of the month was an attack on a convoy off Oran on 10 January 1944. From 20 January it was subordinated to II. Flieger-Division. From 12 February 1944 it took part in the Battle of Anzio and claimed several ships on 24 January. It attacked convoy UGS 30 on 1 February. It made several more claims for destroyed ships on the night of 15/16 February. On 24 February Do 217s from the group sank the destroyer Inglefield. 23 attacks with guided missiles were reported by the group, from 23 January to 1 March 1944. From 24 January to 8 March it lost eight bombers. From 9 March, bar 6. Staffel, the group transferred to Aalborg, Denmark for conversion to the He 177.

6./KG 100 remained with 8 operational (from 9) Do 217s on 20 March. It was handed over to Luftflotte 3. It recorded an attack off the Algerian coast on 29 March against a convoy and again on 1 and 12 April. It attacked convoy UGS 38 on 20 April. 6. and 8. Staffeln exchanged identities meaning the last unit belonging to II Gruppe in the Mediterranean passed to III./KG 100. II Gruppe was concentrated in Aalborg. It spent eight months doing very little because of fuel shortages. It had 32 operational He 177s from 44 in total under the command on Luftflotte Reich on 10 January 1945. On 2 February 1945 it received ordered to destroy the aircraft and the personnel were sent to German Army units.

=== Southern France, Operation Steinbock and Western Front ===
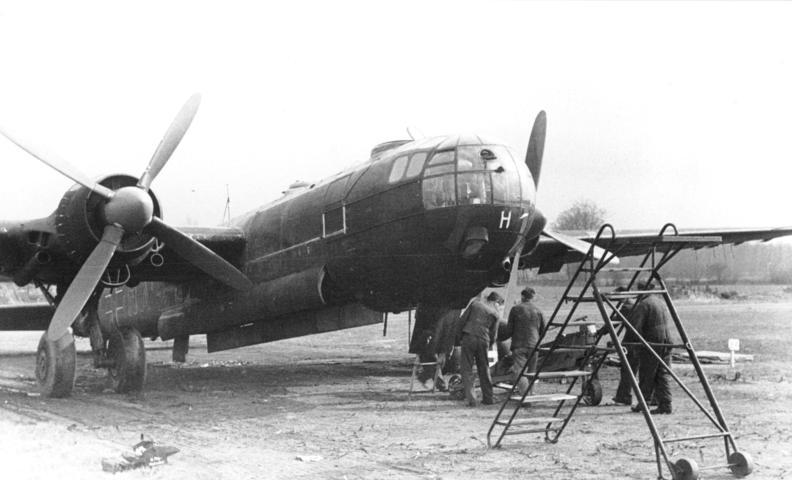
Heinkel He 177 A-3/R2 of 2./KG 100, 21 March 1944

At the beginning of 1944 3./KG 100 was moved to Châteaudun after the reformation of the group on 21 October 1943. It was declared operational with the He 177A-3 on 18 December and placed under the command of IX Fliegerkorps. The remainder of I./KG 100 was based at Lechfeld. It has 27 operational bombers and 31 on record. While here, it was part of the retaliatory bombing raids ordered by Adolf Hitler in retribution for RAF Bomber Command operations over Germany.

Operation Steinbock began on 21 January 1944. I./KG 40 and I./KG 100 bombed London on the night of the 21/22 January to open the offensive. 3./KG 100 lost a He 177 after control had been lost south of Dieppe. It was KG 100's first loss. It formed part of the attacks on the night of the 29/30 January, 3/4 and 12/13 February. 2. Staffel joined the 3rd at Châteaudun on 5 February and the pair bombed London on 18/19, 20/21, 22/23, 23/24, 24/25 and 28 February/1 March, 1/2, 2/3 and 14/15. On 19/20 March it carried out the attack on Hull, before returning to London on 21/22, 24/25 March.

It had only 11 operational aircraft from 21 on 20 March. It raided Bristol on 27/28 March but lost six to attacks by Allied bombers on its bases. Operations were delayed from 1 to 11 April. It attacked Hull on 20/21 April, Bristol 23/24 April, Plymouth on 25/26 April and Portsmouth as on the 26/27, 27/28, 28/29, 29/30 April. Aside from the 26/27 April, it took part in bombing Portsmouth on the same nights. The group used the Fritz X guided missiles on these operations. The attacks against the ports were intended to disrupt preparations for Operation Overlord, which the Germans knew was imminent.

On 19/20 March it lost 2./KG 100 Staffelkapitän Heinrich Müller, when he was shot down by a No. 307 Squadron RAF night fighter piloted by Pilot Officer J. Brochocki. A second Staffelkapitän of the unit was lost on 20/21 April when Herbert Dostlebe and his crew were killed by Flying Officer J. H. Corre from No. 264 Squadron RAF. A third commander of the unit was lost on 26/27 April when Gustav Heckewerth was killed returning from the attack on Portsmouth. Another notable casualty was Herbert Pfeffer of the Stab III./KG 100, shot down by Squadron leader D. J. Williams commanding No. 406 Squadron RAF. A dozen KG 100 bombers, including one Dornier Do 217 and 11 He 177s, were lost on operations. At the end of May 1944, I./KG 100 was redesignated III./KG 1 and ceased to exist.

III./KG 100 remained in the Mediterranean from mid-February to mid-April 1944. Allied attacks against the base at Toulouse cost the Gruppe five Do 217s on 15 April. The group was relocated to forward airfields in northern France and used Fritz X bombs in the attacks on Portsmouth harbour on 29/30 April, in which it tried and failed to sink two battleships. After the D-Day landings on 6 June 1944 it attacked shipping in the Seine on 8 June. It sank the destroyer Lawford. It repeated attacks off the Normandy beachhead on 10 June and on 13 June sank the destroyer Boadicea.

III./KG 100 tried to support German forces in the Battle of Cherbourg by attacking shipping on the night of the 14/15 June 1944. On 25 June it attack ships in the Orne Estuary. On 26 June it could muster 26 Do 217s but after operations against shipping in the Seine and English Channel it lost six bombers on 4/5 July. It claimed a destroyer on 5/6 July and flew night sorties from 17 to 21 July 1944. In late July it used, for the first time, guided missiles against land targets. It attacked a bridge at Avranches on 2/3 August. On 3/4, 4/5 August it attacked the bridge at Pontaubault, and at Pontorsson (5/6 August). On 6/7, 7/8 August it carried out more attacks on bridges at Avranches with Fritz X bombs and Hs 293s. It used Hs 293s against the Pontaubault bridge on 7/8 August.

The Gironde estuary was targeted on 11 August while 15 Do 217s attacked the landing ships of Operation Dragoon in southern France on 15 August 1944. The group claimed a 7,000-ton freighter, and LST and destroyer USS Le Long on operations until 17 August. The group lost 36 crews from 6 June to 16 August, which included 12 losses in the first two weeks of August. On 20 August it began to retreat to Germany, destined for Giebelstadt. The ground echelon came under attack northwest of Montpellier and lost 300 men.

III./KG 100's remaining personnel were transferred to 7. Staffel. It was used in the formation of Bomben-und Zielfinderschule Greifswald to act as pathfinders for KG 4 and KG 66. The exact date of the unit's dissolution is unknown but it ceased to exist by 25 September 1944.

== Geschwaderkommodores ==
- Oberstleutnant Heinz von Holleben, 29 November 1941 – 22 April 1943
- Major Fritz Auffhammer, 4 May 1943 – 10 September 1943
- Oberstleutnant Bernhard Jope, 10 September 1943 – 8 August 1944

== Bibliography ==
- Balke, Ulf (1981). Kampfgeschwader 100 "Wiking" – Eine Geschichte aus Kriegstagebüchern, Dokumenten und Berichten 1934 – 1945 (in German). Motorbuchverlag. ISBN 978-3-87943-772-6.
- Balke, Ulf (1996). Der Luftkrieg in Europa 1941–1945 (in German). Bechtermünz Verlag. ISBN 3860470787.
- Bergstrom, Christer (2007a). Barbarossa - The Air Battle: July–December 1941. London: Chevron/Ian Allan. ISBN 978-1-85780-270-2.
- Bergström, Christer [in Swedish] (2007b). Stalingrad – The Air Battle: 1942 through January 1943. Hinkley: Midland Publishing. ISBN 978-1-85780-276-4.
- Bergström, Christer [in Swedish] (2007c). Kursk—The Air Battle: July 1943. Hersham, Surrey: Classic Publications. ISBN 978-1-903223-88-8.
- Bergström, Christer (2015). The Battle of Britain: An Epic Conflict Revisited. Casemate: Oxford. ISBN 978-1612-00347-4.
- Bergström, Christer [in Swedish]; Mikhailov, Andrey (2001). Black Cross / Red Star—The Air War Over the Eastern Front, Volume II, Resurgence January–June 1942. Pacifica, California: Pacifica Military History. ISBN 978-0-935553-51-2.
- de Zeng, Henry; Stankey, Douglas; Creek, Eddie (2008). Bomber Units of the Luftwaffe 1933-1945; A Reference Source Volume 2. Surrey: Ian Allan Publishing. ISBN 978-1-903223-87-1.
- Dierich, Wolfgang (1995). Die Verbände der Luftwaffe 1935–1945 (in German). Verlag Heinz Nickel. ISBN 3879434379.
- Ford, Roger (2013). Germany's Secret Weapons of World War II. London: Amber Books. ISBN 978-1-909160-56-9.
- Goss, Chris. (2010). The Luftwaffe's Blitz: The Inside Story, November 1940—May 1941. Crecy, Manchester. ISBN 978-0-85979-148-9
- Griehl, Manfred; Dressel, Joachim (1998). Heinkel He 177 – 277 – 274. Shrewsbury, UK: Airlife Publishing. ISBN 978-1-85310-364-3.
- Hayward, Joel S.A. (1998). Stopped at Stalingrad. Lawrence, Kansas: University Press of Kansas. ISBN 978-0-7006-1146-1.
- Hooton, E.R. (1994). Phoenix Triumphant: The Rise and Rise of the Luftwaffe. Arms & Armour, ISBN 1854091816.
- Hooton, E. R. (1997). Eagle in Flames: The Fall of the Luftwaffe. Brockhampton Press. ISBN 978-1-86019-995-0.
- Mackay, Ron (2011). The Last Blitz: Operation Steinbock, the Luftwaffe's Last Blitz on Britain – January to May 1944. Red Kite. ISBN 978-0-9554735-8-6.
- Mason, Francis (1969). Battle Over Britain. McWhirter Twins, London. ISBN 978-0-901928-00-9
- Muller, Richard (1992). The German Air War in Russia. Nautical & Aviation Publishing. Baltimore, Maryland. ISBN 1-877853-13-5
- Parker, Nigel (2013). Luftwaffe Crash Archive: Volume 1: A Documentary History of Every Enemy Aircraft Brought Down Over the United Kingdom, September 1939 – 14 August 1940. Red Kite, London. ISBN 978-1906592097
- Wakefield, Ken (1999). Pfadfinder: Luftwaffe Pathfinder Operations Over Britain. NPI Media Group. ISBN 978-0-75241-692-2.
