= Air Power, Insurgency and the "War on Terror" =

2009 non-fiction book by Joel Hayward

- Front cover
- Author: Joel Hayward
- Language: English
- Subject: warfare, strategy; military history, airpower
- Publisher: Royal Air Force Centre for Air Power Studies
- Publication date: 2009
- Publication place: United Kingdom
- Media type: Softcover
- Pages: 315
- ISBN: 978-0-9552189-6-5

Air Power, Insurgency and the "War on Terror" is a 2009 non-fiction book on airpower (military aviation) edited by British-New Zealand scholar Joel Hayward.

== Summary ==
Hayward has assembled a team of authoritative analysts on the use of airpower during the so-called War on terror, meaning the counterinsurgencies in Afghanistan and Iraq in the 2000s. The book goes further by analyzing the development of the ideas and practices of using air power in counterinsurgency and other asymmetrical roles.

== Reviews ==
A review by Michael Robert Terry in The Journal of Military History stated: "Joel Hayward's edited work, Air Power, Insurgency and the "War on Terror", successfully presents the foundations of air power's historical, contemporary, and moral relationships to irregular warfare. ... [It] provides thought provoking reading, while the collection of papers provides much needed critical thinking about the relationship of air power to meet the challenges of conducting counter-insurgent operations within the context of irregular warfare and terrorism."
