= Philip Sabin =

British military historian

Philip A. G. Sabin
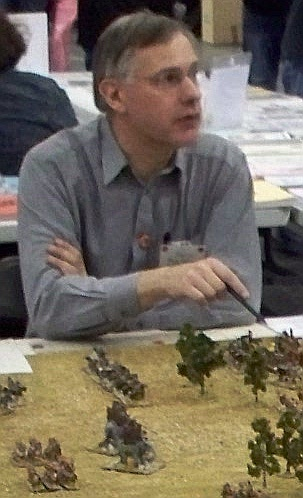
- Philip Sabin umpiring a simulation of Zama using his Lost Battles system

Academic work
- Main interests: military history, including air power; ancient warfare
- Notable ideas: Lost Battles system

Philip A. G. Sabin is a British military historian who is currently Professor of Strategic Studies in the War Studies Department of King's College London.

== Biography ==
Sabin is a member of the CAS Air Power Workshop, a small working group of scholars and other theorists convened by the Chief of Air Staff. He is also a member of the Academic Advisory Panel of the Royal Air Force Centre for Air Power Studies. His books on modern warfare include: The Future of United Kingdom Air Power (1988). His works on ancient warfare include: Lost Battles: Reconstructing the Great Clashes of the Ancient World (2008), which the Michigan War Studies Review called "engaging and fresh", and The Cambridge History of Greek and Roman Warfare (with fellow editors Hans van Wees and Michael Whitby, 2008). The latter has been praised in the Bryn Mawr Classical Review, which reported: "The editors as well as the authors can be congratulated on their efforts in producing this important reference work" which is an "accomplished work ... teeming with numerous fascinating details".

Among Sabin's articles are: ”The Mechanics of Battle in the Second Punic War”, Bulletin of the Institute of Classical Studies, Vol. 41, No. 67 (February 1996), pp. 59–79; and "Perspectives within the Profession." Air Power Review Vol. 8 No. 4 (Winter 2005), pp. 21–34.

In 2010, Sabin published an RAF CAPS (Royal Air Force Centre for Air Power Studies) Discussion Paper entitled: "The Current and Future Utility of Air and Space Power". This Discussion Paper was republished as a 'viewpoint' in Air Power Review, Volume 10 Number 3 (2010), pp. 155–173.

In 2011, Sabin published "The Benefits and Limits of Computerization in Conflict Simulation" in Literary & Linguistic Computing, Volume 26 Number 3, pp. 323–328.

His most recent book is Simulating War: Studying Conflict Through Simulation Games (Continuum, 2012. ISBN 978-1441185587). The Times Higher Education's reviewer wrote: "Sabin has written the most readable book on this topic to appear in a long time. It is well written, entertaining and presents a lot of original material and new ideas on war-game design."

== Books ==
Sabin has published books, articles and conference papers including:

- The Third World War Scare in Britain: A Critical Analysis (Palgrave Macmillan, 1986. ISBN 978-0333407783).
- The Future of United Kingdom Air Power (1988).
- Philip Sabin and Michael Clarke, editors, British Defence Choices for the Twenty-first Century: A Centre for Defence Studies Book (Brassey's, 1993. ISBN 978-1857530889).
- Philip Sabin, Michael Whitby and Hans van Wees, editors, Cambridge History of Greek and Roman Warfare: Volume I: Greece, the Hellenistic World and the Rise of Rome Cambridge (Cambridge University Press, 2007).
- Philip Sabin, Michael Whitby and Hans van Wees, editors, "Cambridge History of Greek and Roman Warfare: Volume 2, Rome from the Late Republic to the Late Empire: Rome from the Late Republic to the Late Empire" (Cambridge University Press, 2007).
- Lost Battles: Reconstructing the Great Clashes of the Ancient World (2008. ISBN 978-0826430151).
- Simulating War: Studying Conflict Through Simulation Games (Continuum, 2012. ISBN 978-1441185587).
