= Centre for Air Power Studies =

Centre for Air Power Studies may refer to:

- Royal Air Force Centre for Air Power Studies, UK
- Centre for Air Power Studies (India)
