= The Warrior Prophet =

The Warrior Prophet may refer to:

- The Warrior Prophet (novel), 2005 novel by R. Scott Bakker
- The Warrior Prophet: Muhammad and War, 2022 biographical book by Joel Hayward
