= Kalamaki =

Kalamaki is the Greek word for a small reed, and thus for a skewer or drinking straw, and may refer to:

- an alternative name for souvlaki
- places in Greece:
  - Kalamaki, Attica, a neighborhood of Alimos in South Athens
  - Kalamaki, a village in the community of Limnochori, Achaea
  - Kalamaki, Zakynthos, a resort town on the island of Zakynthos
  - Kalamaki, Patras, a neighbourhood of Patras, Achaea
- Kalkan, a town in Turkey formerly called Kalamaki
