= Airpower and the Environment =

2013 non-fiction book by Joel Hayward

Airpower and the Environment: The Ecological Implications of Modern Air Warfare
- Author: Joel Hayward
- Language: English
- Subject: warfare, strategy; military history, airpower
- Publisher: Air University Press
- Publication date: 2013
- Publication place: United States
- Media type: Softcover
- Pages: 272
- ISBN: 978-1-58566-223-4
- OCLC: 891583329

Airpower and the Environment: The Ecological Implications of Modern Air Warfare is a 2013 non-fiction book on airpower (military aviation) edited by British-New Zealand scholar Joel Hayward. It analyses the impact of modern warfare, especially airpower, on the natural environment.

== Summary ==
Hayward assembled a team of military and civilian experts in various disciplines to chronicle and analyze the effects of airpower on the environment. Their analysis highlights the fact that air forces now take far more care of the environment than ever before and that many air forces, even in less developed regions such as central Africa, have created strategies to minimize all harm and even to do environmentally beneficial activities. This book reveals that some military forces have nonetheless struggled to deal with these critical issues. Creating air bases and then later vacating them after intensive use has caused harm, as has the failure in airpower’s first seventy years to create aircraft than can be repurposed or deconstructed with minimal environmental harm. The book argues that, during both peace and war, air forces have far greater carbon footprints than armies and navies. They use potentially more harmful ordnance. Their targets traditionally include objects in or around population centers and the aquifers, waterways, soils, and food sources that sustain human life. Also, because of historic targeting trends that will continue for some years, air forces cause far worse harm to environmentally significant production, storage, and distribution infrastructure, much of it based on petroleum, oil, lubricants, or chemicals.

== Reviews ==
In 2013, the American Library Association selected this book as one of that year’s "Notable Government Documents", an annual award list designed to "recognize excellence and raise awareness of information resources produced by all levels of government and promote their use".

The Gulf Today newspaper called it "innovative" and a "ground-breaking book highlighting the environmental impact of the world’s air forces.”
