= Kampfgeschwader 27 =

German bomber wing of World War II

- Active: 1 May 1939 – April 1945
- Country: Nazi Germany
- Branch: Luftwaffe
- Type: Bomber wing
- Role: Maritime interdiction Air interdiction Close air support Offensive counter air Anti-aircraft warfare
- Size: Air Force Wing
- Nickname: Boelcke
- Patron: Oswald Boelcke
- Engagements: World War II

Commanders
- Notable commanders: Hans-Henning Freiherr von Beust

Insignia
- Identification symbol: Geschwaderkennung of 1G

Kampfgeschwader 27 Boelcke was a Luftwaffe medium bomber wing of World War II.

Formed in May 1939, KG 27 first saw action in the German invasion of Poland in September 1939. During the Phoney War—September 1939 – April 1940—the bomber wing flew armed reconnaissance missions over France. In May 1940 it fought in the Battle of Belgium and Battle of France through to the end of the campaigns in June 1940.

In July 1940, KG 27 fought in the Battle of Britain and The Blitz until June 1941. In June 1941 the unit's Gruppen participated in Operation Barbarossa and spent the next years on the Eastern front until 1944, until it was withdrawn to assist the evacuation of the German-occupied Greece and Yugoslavia. It returned to the Eastern Front until November 1944.

At this time, all three combat groups remained operational but were converted to fighter units for Defence of the Reich duties. It is not known when KG 27 was disbanded. An anti-locomotive staffel was known to have operated as a bomber unit into April 1945. The date given for Oberstleutnant Rudolf Kiel's relief of command is 10 April 1945. Kiel was the wing's final commanding officer.

== Formation ==
Stab. (command staffel – squadron)/KG 27 was formed at Hannover-Langenhagen on 1 May 1939 from stab./KG 157. Oberst Hans Behrendt was appointed as the first Geschwaderkommodore. On 1 September 1939 it mustered five operational bombers from six.

I./KG 27 was formed from I./KG 157 at the same base. Oberstleutnant Fritz Graumnitz was appointed as the group's commander. The group could field 31 from 35 operational bombers. Major Sigismund Freiher von Falkenstein led the group from 1 October 1940 to 21 May 1940. He was succeeded by Gerhard Ulbricht on 3 June 1940, with Konrad Aschenbrenner acting as commander in between.

II./KG 27 was formed at Wunstorf, with Major Arno deSalengre Drabbe in command on 32 (of 35) combat-ready bombers.

III./KG 27 was formed at Delmenhorst by the redesignation of III./KG 157. Otto Sommer was placed in the command. All three groups were equipped with the Heinkel He 111 and trained through the summer to reach operational readiness. Third group was the largest with 33 airworthy bombers from a total of 36. Sommer was replaced on 30 June 1939 with Oberstleutnant Andreas Nielsen until 24 February 1940.

== War Service ==
KG 27 was fragmented and placed unto different divisions and air fleets. Stab./KG 27 was placed under IV Fliegerkorps under the command of Luftflotte 2 at Hannover-Langenhagen. I./KG 27 was based at the same location but was assigned to the 1st Flieger-Division, under Luftflotte 1 as did the second group. III./KG 27 also remained with this division but was based in Königsberg-Neumark.

=== Poland and Phoney War ===
On 1 September the Wehrmacht invaded Poland beginning World War II. All three groups attacked Warsaw in Operation Sea Side. KG 27 had to fly from bases in Hannover (450 mi; 725 km) for the most part and returned to forward landing grounds in Pomerania. The mission was largely ineffective. Colonel Stefan Pawlikowski's Pursuit Brigade offered fierce resistance but lost 17 percent of its strength as Messerschmitt Bf 110 destroyer groups protected the bombers. The objective was to destroy Poland's industrial base and political will. The army objected to the weight of the attack and persuaded Hitler to divert support to ground operations in the first crucial hours, reducing the impact of the attack and postponing it to later in the day.

On the third day the OKL decided to end the counter-air campaign and strike at Polish aircraft industry only for Hermann Göring to change his mind. KG 27 was held in reserve. Third group was assigned back to Albert Kesselring's air fleet and bombed rail targets around Warsaw. III./KG 27 remained with the 1. Flieger-division supporting the advance of the German Fourth Army pursuing the Army Poznań. It was moved to Luftflotte 4 on 6 September and III./KG 27 moved south.

Individually KG 27 bombed many targets in northern and central Poland. I./KG 27 struck at targets and cities in the Narew, Łódź (Battle of Łódź) and Lublin escorts from 1 to 27 September. II. and III. operated in the same way but was withdrawn on 17 September, the same day of the Soviet invasion of Poland. The former transferred to Delmenhorst and the later to Wunstorf. Poland capitulated to the invaders on 6 October 1939.

KG 27 spent the Phoney War refitting. I./KG 27 was involved in leaflet dropping and armed reconnaissance in the Amiens, Lille and Arras area. 2. Staffel (Squadron) were involved in such operations on 19 November 1939. Second and third group also carried flew on such sorties. The latter also dropped leaflets on Bethune. The types of missions were flown until April 1940

=== Western Europe ===
By 10 May 1940 Stab. and I. groups were at Hannover while II. and III. remained at Delmenhorst and Wunstorf respectively. KG 27 was handed to the IV Fliegerkorps under the command of Luftflotte 2. All but one of first group's 36 He 111s were operational while second group could muster 25 from 35 machines and third group 32 from 38.

On 10 May Fall Gelb was put into effect, beginning the Battle of the Netherlands, Battle of Belgium and Battle of France. I./KG 27 was immediately in action over Lille, Antwerp, Brussels and Namur. II./KG 27 bombed targets in Norrent-Fontes and Dunkirk. Third group struck at Lille Airport. KG 27 flew in small formations, to cover multiple targets. On the outward route it flew over the North Sea and down along the Dutch coast, but were soon spotted. The Luftwaffe hit 47 airfields in France on the first day. Boulogne, Abbeville, Berck, Saint-Inglevert and Cambrai were also hit. KG 27 and KG 54 spearheaded IV Fliegerkorps' air assault in this sector.

Stab./KG 27 suffered the first loss in combat. The gunners accounted for four Hawker Hurricanes shot down; one from No. 3 Squadron RAF, one from No. 607 Squadron RAF and two from No. 85 Squadron RAF with injury to the pilots. Two other bombers were lost on this mission and four damaged—all from II./KG 27. IV Fliegerkorps destroyed 25 aircraft on the ground on 10 May. On this first day, seven of KG 27's aircraft were reported missing, two written off and five were damaged.

From 10 to 15 May II./KG 27 supported the German Sixth Army in Belgium attacking Lille, Antwerp, Brussels and Namur. II./KG 27 was in action over Gembloux on 11 May, prior to the Battle of Gembloux, and was engaged by French fighters over Calais. It flew in support of the advance in Flanders and Artois, but also the break-through to the English Channel. It lost an aircraft over Cambrai and Tournai on 18 May. The group lost its commander Major Reinhold Tamm shot down and captured. Tamm had replaced Drabbe on 29 March. Friedrich-Karl Schlichting assumed command of the group.

III./KG 27 bombed targets in the Lille, Antwerp, Brussels and Namur area in the same time frame and also attacked Wavre on 16 May. III./KG 27 and its operations are not well recorded. It is believed to have supported the Flanders advance in the Artois region and perhaps offered interdiction support at the Battle of Gembloux.

At this time, one recorded action on 14 May involved I and III./KG 27, which was supported by low-level Henschel Hs 123s from II(S)./LG 2 and escorted by II./JG 2. 607 and No. 242 Squadron RAF intercepted; 2, 7 and 9. Staffel lost one aircraft. Another 2. Staffel bomber returned with a dead pilot and bomber damaged. Another notable battle took place with III./KG 27 was intercepted over Lille while attacking targets in the Soissons and Compiegne sector. The 8. Staffel and two 9. Staffel bombers were shot down. Four were killed and the rest captured.

On 20 May Army Group A reached the Channel. I./ KG 27 flew in support of the Battle for Calais and the Battle of Dunkirk. II./KG 27 also bombed the port at Dunkirk until 31 May and attacked Diksmuide and Ostend in Belgium on 27 May. III./KG 27 supported the Siege of Lille and the capture of Roulers. It reported three losses on 22 May. One of them was the group commander Hauptmann Ulrich Schirmer.

On 3 June KG 27 flew in Operation Paula, the attacks against airfields and industry in Paris. On the first day of Fall Rot KG 27 lost five aircraft, KG 54 four, and JG 27 another five. I./KG 27 supported to push along the French Channel coast. It bombed Orléans, and targets over the Seine, Rouen and in the Loire. Ports at Le Havre and Cherbourg were attacked. II./KG 27 supported first group and the advance into Brittany. Third group appears to have been withdrawn from operations to recuperate in May and June.

By 14 June Alfred Keller commanding IV Fliegerkorps sent out armed reconnaissance aircraft to find targets in an increasingly fluid situation. III./KG 27 dispatched 20 Heinkels on these flights.

On 28/29 June 1940, KG 27 began operations against ports in southern England and Wales. By the Armistice of 22 June 1940 the three groups had moved into their respective bases at Tours, Dinard and Rennes.

=== Battle of Britain ===
KG 27 replaced commanding officer Behrendt with Oberst Bernhard Georgi on 21 June. KG 27 began flying night operations over Britain on 28/29 June 1940 before the Battle of Britain started. These operations were restricted to southern England and Wales. All three groups remained with Fliegerkorps IV, now under the command of Luftflotte 3.

First group began the campaign with 22 of 32 bombers serviceable. The status of second group shows 21 of 34 bombers were available before the main attacks started on 13 August. III./KG 27 could field 23 operational machines from 31 on 13 August. Third group did not have a commanding officer, according to records, after the death of their commander on 22 May. At some point in early June Major Manfred Freiherr Speck von Sternberg took command.

KG 27 was a participant in the Kanalkampf battles. On 17 July Oberarzt Dr Zobel and his crew likely became the first fatalities. Stab./KG 27 and first group were out hunting for British convoys later that afternoon. Twenty miles south of Bognor Regis, Six Hawker Hurricanes of No. 145 Squadron RAF intercepted them and Geschwaderkommodore Georgi was killed. Oberst Dipl-Ing Gerhard Conrad replaced him.

On 30 July II./KG 27 was known to have attacked Bristol and shipping in the Bristol Channel. On 11 August I. and II./KG 54 attacked Portland while 20 He 111s from KG 27 bombed Bristol. Despite escort from I. and II./ZG 2 and III./JG 2, II./KG 27 suffered an early blow when its commanding officer Friedrich-Karl Schlichting was shot down and captured. Also on board was Hans-Jürgen Brehmer, adjutant of the Luftwaffe General Staff. No. 87 Squadron RAF claimed the victory.

On 13 August 1940—Adlertag—KG 27 flew against Bristol, Birkenhead and Liverpool. KG 27 abandoned most of its operations. III./KG 27 did attempt to make it through to the Bristol docks, for example, losing one He 111 to No. 87 Squadron RAF in the attempt. Little damage was done.

The following day unprotected bombers from the third group bombed Southampton where the main rail line was blocked. Three small formations of He 111s penetrated No. 10 Group RAF's fighter screen undetected and flew north to the West Midlands. The airfield at Colerne, Wiltshire, was bombed with little damage. Three managed to reach Sealand airfield in Cheshire where more damage was done, but had no lasting effect. Anti-aircraft gunfire betrayed their presence and No. 7 Operational Training Unit pilots scrambled and shot one down. No. 92 Squadron RAF and No. 43 Squadron RAF also intercepted; two bombers fell to each squadron. Of the five bombers lost, two crewmen were killed and the rest were reported missing and their fate is unknown. One squadron leader was among them.

KG 27 escaped the heavy fighting of 15 August without loss. The following day a full-strength raid, escorted by Bf 110s, was caught as it crossed the coast near Brighton. No. 1, 64 and 615 Squadron intercepted and the latter accounted for one bomber from I. and II./KG 27. One crew was rescued by a Heinkel He 59 air-sea rescue unit.

On The Hardest Day II./KG 27 attempted attacks on the Liverpool docks and lost one aircraft off Dungeness. 610 Squadron destroyed one raider and two others were damaged in forced-landings. In one incident, a KG 27 He 111, shortly before midnight, attacked the flying and training school at Windrush, in Gloucestershire, where night flying was in progress. The bomber crashed into an Avro Anson killing all five men involved.

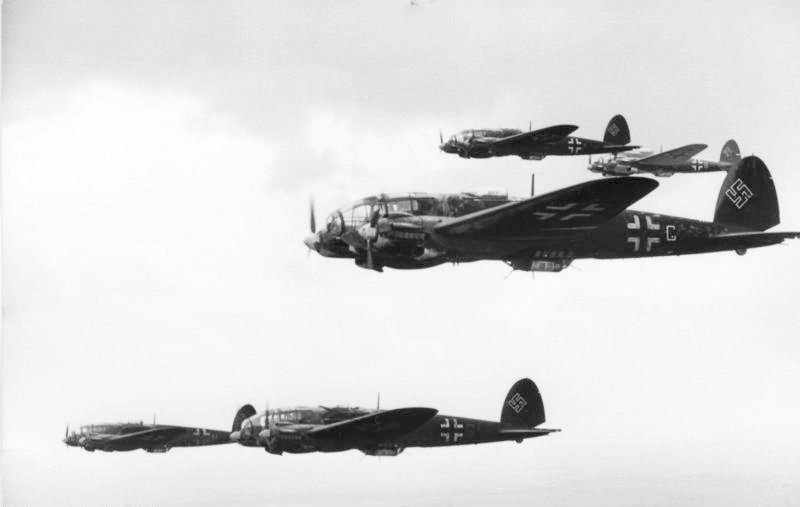
He 111s. KG 27 operated this machine exclusively, while it was a bomber unit.

On 19 August and 20 August, KG 27 attempted to strike at the Albert Dock, Liverpool. On the former date, one He 111 of third group was caught and destroyed by No. 66 Squadron RAF at 18:30 in the evening. In the early hours of the 20th, at least 30 tracks were reported over Lincolnshire and Nottinghamshire. Some crews did not persevere across country, and unloaded bombs on RAF Bomber Command flare paths. Five such airfields were hit and six aircraft destroyed. Apart from Liverpool, which was hit by 12 aircraft, Sheffield, Derby, Hull, Nottingham and Leicester were raided by a small number of bombers and there were 112 British casualties.

I./KG 27 flew mainly maritime patrol operations between Brittany and Ireland from mid-August to early September. The second group continued with night attacks on Liverpool, Birkenhead, London, Birmingham and Coventry until 29 August. Third group also engaged in night attacks and flew sporadic attacks on airfields. On 30 August it lost one bomber in a daylight raid over the English coast to 601 Squadron and another was brought damaged by ground-fire over the West Midlands.

By 7 September serviceability rates had fallen. I. Gruppe had only 13 of 35 bombers available while two group had 15 from 32 available. On this date, the emphasis shifted from attacking airfields, to attacking London.

Third group had been reduced to just 20 He 111s of which 13 were operational. Second and third group flew a few to a moderate number of attacks on airfields in September. On 13 September III./KG 27 flew against targets in the Bristol Channel area. On 18 and 19 September KG 27 was known to have operated for it suffered losses in accidents and combat. On 20th I./KG 27 lost Staffelkapitän Josef Fellinger, west of London. On 24 September, a first group aircraft in maritime patrol got lost and landed in Gijón in Spain. The crew were handed back and not interned.

=== The Blitz ===
In October the bombing campaign shifted to night, and became known as The Blitz. KG 27 was in action on 8 and 9 October. The 22 October was particularly costly. Three He 111s were lost; one struck a barracks after combat damage killing 13, along with the crew, and injuring 11 ground-crew. Two bombers crashed following in-air fires. One of the bombers was piloted by III./KG 27 commanding officer Manfred Speck von Sternberg. Hans-Henning von Beust replaced him formally on 31 October.

KG 27 flew throughout the Blitz, with all three groups operating. A full list of the targets, dates, and groups involved is known. KG 27 supported the attacks on major industrial cities: the Plymouth Blitz, Southampton Blitz, Cardiff Blitz, Manchester Blitz, Liverpool Blitz, Coventry Blitz, Birmingham Blitz, Sheffield Blitz, Portsmouth Blitz, Glasgow Blitz, Bristol Blitz, Hull Blitz, and Belfast Blitz.

Specific operations were also carried out. All three groups were involved in Operation Mondscheinsonate (Moonlight Sonata), which was the code word for the attack on Coventry on 14 November 1940. Most notably III./KG 27 was involved in the 29 December 1940 attack on the British capital, which became known as the Second Great Fire of London. The group was the first wave of bombers to hit London that night between 20:14 and 20:55 GMT.

KG 27 operated with multiple groups and which each group attacking several targets in one night. For example, on 6/7 November 1940, III./KG 27 struck Liverpool, Southampton, Bristol, Falmouth and Fowey.

Other towns were also bombed; Portland, Exmouth, Bognor Regis, Bournemouth, Cheltenham, Poole, Weymouth, Portishead, Avonmouth, Gravesend, Bridgeport, Swansea, Filton, Yate, "Stoke" (which one is unknown), Pembroke, Braunton, St Athan, Clydeside, Nottingham and Derby.

I./KG 27 switched to anti-shipping operations in the last week of April. All three groups returned to bombing operations for the final time on 4/5 June 1941. I and II./KG 27 attacked Birmingham while third group struck at Bristol alone; the Filton, Colerne and Hucclecote area were hit.

=== Eastern Front ===
KG 27 transferred to Romania in mid-June 1941. Stab., I., and II./KG 27 were based at Focșani. III./KG 27 was moved to Zilistea. All remained under the IV Fliegerkorps and were assigned to Luftflotte 4 to support Army Group South. Third group mustered 25 serviceable He 111s from 28 at the outset; second group, 21 from 24; first group 22 from 30. Little is known of I. and III./KG 27 operations until early September 1941.

On 22 June Operation Barbarossa began. KG 27 flew against Red Air Force airfields in the Bălți, Kamenets and Podolsk sectors. The front-line along the Soviet-Romanian border was not as fluid as elsewhere in the first ten days of the war. KG 27 remained the air corps' only bomber unit. The VVS Southern Front was KG 27's main adversary.

It supported the advance in Bessarabia from 24 June and Operation München. Bombed targets in Stanislau, Kirovograd, Odessa, Dnepropetrovsk and the Stalin Line. The main concern was rail interdiction. Rail yards at Zhmerinka were hit on 3 July, as well as Khotyn on 5th day and roop concentrations near Mogilev. Over Moldavia on 7 July KG 27 claimed to have destroyed 70 lorries for no loss. The following day III./KG 27 suffered five bombers and damaged and then on 10 July lost its commanding officer Fritz Reinhard killed in action.

From 12 to 19 July rail lines in the Zhmerinka area near Vinnitsa were hit. From 20 to 21 July the rail line between Cherkassy and Dolinskaya, and also traffic on the Balta and Vapnyarka lines were "shot up." On 20 July alone KG 27 claimed the destruction of 20 trains despite opposition from the Soviet 131 IAP which damaged at least one aircraft. KG 27 disrupted the Soviet supply lines and Soviet fighter forces were unable to cover them. KG 27 flew in support of the Battle of Uman. Odessa Harbour on 24 July and trains in the Pervomaisk area were likely hit on 27 July.

In August, I./KG 27 attacked the Melitopol-Zaporozhye rail line. From 15 to 18 August it attacked airfields around the former and assisted the XXX Corps in crossing the Dnieper 30 August. The Simferopol-Sivash rail line in the crime was attacked on 21 August. II./KG 27 operated in the same areas. In September the main effort seemed to be against airfields, although Perekop was attacked on 25 September. III./KG 27 operated in the western and central areas of Ukraine. It had lost only six aircraft by 15 August.

In late August and September KG 27's focus shifted to Odessa and the Crimea. It was ordered to destroy shipping, and with StG 77, to dispose of the Black Sea Fleet. I. and II./KG 27 began "rolling attacks" against Odessa in support of the German 11th Army. 97 tons of bombs were dropped on the port by 60 aircraft. On 18 September KG 27 was ordered to interdict all naval traffic from the Crimea to Odessa. The following day, Wolfgang Skorczewski, of 3./KG 27, sank the transport Udarnyy east of the port and was awarded the Knight's Cross of the Iron Cross. The emphasis shifted back to airfields and air superiority in the Crimea. On 27 September KG 27 lost three bombers in these raids for little return. Major General Yermachenkov's VVS ChF frustrated the German air and land advance.

KG 27 submitted claims for six ships sunk and another eight damaged on 16 October. Only one ship (1,412-t Bolshevik) was sunk, and by neighbouring I./KG 28. The Axis air forces were unable to prevent the evacuation of 350,000 soldiers and civilians and 200,000 of arms and material during the Siege of Odessa, although the city did fall. Soviet fighter and anti-aircraft defences were very strong and contributed to a prolonged defence which disrupted Army Group South's advance.

In the month of September KG 27 flew 871 sorties, claimed 15 aircraft destroyed, one destroyer and three freighters sunk, 243 vehicles and three trains destroyed.

In October KG 27 continued operating on the Black Sea and over the Caucasus. II./KG 27 flew a night attack against Kacha airfield on the night of 2 October and attacked Yeisk harbour on the Sea of Azov on 7 October. From 4 to 12 October, the group attacked troop columns, trains, airfields, and harbours in the Melitopol, Berdyansk, Rostov area. From 15 to 27 October it flew against shipping in the Crimea and against Saky airfield. The group was withdrawn to Germany in early November. I./KG 27 assisted in attacks against shipping from 18 to 31 October.

On 12 November nine He 111s suffered a loss when a MiG 3 piloted by Lieutenant Yakov Ivanov brought down Wilhelm Hofmann's bomber by ramming as the bombed the port of Gelendzhik. In November, KG 27 flew 503 sorties, claimed 53 aircraft, one destroyer, 12 freighters, seven trains, three tanks and 294 vehicles destroyed. KG 27 supported German forces in the Battle of Rostov.

=== Black Sea and Stalingrad ===
The main activities of KG 27 in the winter, 1941/42, revolved around the Battle of the Kerch Peninsula. I./KG 27 was based at Kirovograd from 29 December 1941 and did not return to Germany. Mine laying was carried out by the group from 1 to 18 January 1942. The ports of Feodosiya and Sevastopol. Kerch harbour was also mined. Trains and rail targets were attacked of the 22 to 22 January in the Izyum area. Until March rail and troop concentrations remained a priority in the Crimea and eastern Ukraine. II./KG 27 was moved to support Army Group Centre. It dropped supplies to the Demyansk pocket and Kholm. It flew support operations around Lake Ilmen and Staraya Russa until 29 March. The group was mostly likely withdrawn to Germany until June 1942 when it returned to Ukraine and southern Russia. III./KG 27 remained in Crimea. It flew against targets in the Izyum area and the ports of Novorossisk (7 March), Sevastopol, Feodosiya mainly. In November 1941 one of the group's aircraft crashed killing General der Jagdflieger Werner Mölders.

The Black Sea campaign intensified in the spring. On 18 March I./KG 27 damaged a transport and a floating battery in the port of Kerch. KG 27 flew 606 sorties in March 1942. KG 27 was rushed north in May 1942 as a Soviet offensive began the Second Battle of Kharkov. It arrived on 13 May. KG 27 formed part of Fliegerkorps IV's contribution to the battle. The air corps claimed 596 aircraft in the air, through fighter units, and 19 on the ground by the conclusion of the battle. Another 227 tanks, 3,083 motor vehicles, 24 artillery batteries, two anti-aircraft batteries, 49 artillery pieces, 22 locomotives, six complete trains were also destroyed for the cost of 49 aircraft.

KG 27 supported the German 6th Army attack on Volchansk, to acquire a staging area for Operation Blue. KG 27 were active in the battle for the Don Bend. The Soviet 2nd and 15th Air Army, with the 1st and 101st Fighter Regiments offered stiff resistance. KG 27's airfields were also targeted. KG 27 supported the Battle of Voronezh. KG 27 flew from daylight to evening in the prolonged battle and reported Soviet air forces attacked their bases and some losses From 8 to 17 August, I./KG 27 crews flew up to four missions per day. On 29 June I./KG 27 managed to destroy an ammunition train of some 40 rail cars.

KG 27 was sent south soon after to support the 6th Army in the Battle of Stalingrad. The bombers supported the carpet bombing of the city from 23 August. II./KG 27 also attacked shipping moving along the Volga River north of Stalingrad. I./KG 27 bombed rail targets west and east of the Volga. The group was selected to carry out long-range bombing operations against the Baku-Armavir. With second group, it bombed shipping and barges evacuating machinery from Stalingrad on 3 August. KG 27 also returned to the Voronezh area bombing bridgeheads on the east bank of the Don; in one day I./KG 27 flew 14 missions against targets heavily defended by anti-aircraft artillery. First group possessed 22 aircraft by 20 September; only 13 were operational. Second group's condition was much worse; only eight aircraft from 18 remaining were combat ready. Third group still had 25 He 111s, but with only 12 operational. Second group was pulled out from 4 to 14 October to rest and refit in Germany at Hannover.

After the Soviet Operation Uranus surrounded Axis forces in the city, the remaining groups took part in desperate counterattacks. Even medium bombers were used in close air support. With other units, KG 27 inflicted heavy losses to Soviet infantry and horses on 25 November in action along the Chir river. KG 27 assisted with the failed airlift but third group was sent to Hannover to rebuild and rest from December 1942 until 14 January 1943. The group returned to combat operations as Army Group South sought to prevent a total collapse of the front. II./KG 27 is known to have supported the recapture of Kharkov and Belgorod in March 1943.

=== Crimea to the Balkans ===
KG 27 flew support for the 17th Army at the Kuban bridgehead, around the Taman Peninsula in April and May 1943. It bombed rail, roads, bridgeheads and troop concentrations south of Novorossisk. On 30 May it bombed targets in the Krasnodar area. In June it assisted in the strategic bombing effort against Gorki and the tank factory located there on 5 June and the rubber plant at Yaroslavl from 4 to 13 June as well as rail targets. II./KG 27 bombed the rubber plant on 20 June and suffered damage to one bomber from a Soviet night fighter.

On 5 July 1943 the Battle of Kursk began. Until 15 July it supported offensive operations. After the rapid failure of the offensive I./KG 27 supported the 1st Panzer Army and the reformed 6th Army against the Soviet Operation Polkovodets Rumyantsev until 5 August when it left for Germany. The previous day KG 27 suffered against air superiority, losing six bombers.

II./KG 27 supported the 1st Panzer Army and 8th Army along the Mius River and the defences at Vitebsk Gomel until mid-October. It bombed a variety of targets in the Kirovograd and Kiev areas in November and December 1943. III./KG 27 remained until early September 1943 when it was moved south to support the 17th Army's evacuation of the Kuban. On 27 September KG 27 lost another six bombers in this sector.

I./KG 27 returned to Ukraine in January 1944 and flew attack and air-supply missions in the Battle of the Korsun–Cherkassy Pocket. Second and third groups were probably involved also. I./KG 27 also assisted in the evacuation of Odessa from 23 March to 9 April 1944. The group retreated to Focsani, Romania on the latter date. From there KG 27 flew supply missions to Sarabuz. They also flew anti-tank missions; on 11 April crews claimed 44 Soviet tanks in operations over the Perekop Isthmus. II./KG 27 was sent to Sarabus in Crimea and flew support operations until ordered to Königsberg to rest and refit on 30 May 1944. It remained inactive due to fuel shortages. By 31 July it had 38 He 111s and was sent to Athens, Greece to help evacuate German forces from the country, and then Yugoslavia until 7 October 1944. It was ordered to Horsching, Austria where it was renamed II./KG(J) 27 and became a fighter unit from 23 November.

I./KG 27 flew night combat missions against rail and airfields during the Soviet summer offensive Operation Bagration. Gomel, Rovno, Korosten, Minsk, Sarny, Kazatin were attacked over June and July 1944. By 30 June it could muster 41 He 111s but fuel shortages reduced flying time and at Raffelding Austria, it was renamed I./KG(J) 27 and committed to Defence of the Reich duties from 23 November 1944.

III./KG 27's operations are not known. It did fly supply missions to Vilnius in Lithuania from 12 to 15 July and to German forces isolated by the Soviet offensive (23 July). By 31 August, the group's 32 Heinkels were sent to Athens to help evacuate German forces from the Balkans. At Wels, on 23 November 1944, it became KG 27's third fighter group.

== Other units ==
IV.(Erg)/KG 27 was formed in June or July 1940. Erganzungsgruppe./KG 27 was the initial designation but it was renamed on 24 November 1940. It was probably formed at Avord, France. The main purpose of the group was to provide reserve aircraft and crew to resupply the three bomber groups. It remained in France until August 1942. The group was four staffel (squadron) strong; numbers 10 to 13 were under its command by August 1942. It saw some action in the west; for example it flew a bombing raid on Southampton on 7 July 1941, and Birmingham from 27 to 31 July 1942. It took a peripheral part in the Battle of Stalingrad, and bombed Kalach on 30 November (12 Staffel). It was based at Poltava but then transferred to Vinnitsa in January 1943. It moved to East Prussia in May 1943 and stayed for exactly a year in training. It moved to Dijon, France and then Czechoslovakia on 26 July 1944. Pilots and radio operators were retrained and the group was dissolved on 23 November 1944.

14.(Eis)/KG 27 was an independent staffel and specialised in anti-locomotive operations. It was formed at Kiev in either December 1942, or January 1943. In March 1944, the unit was part of VIII Fliegerkorps but by 26 June was under the command of IV Fliegerkorps. It fought around Kiev, Voronezh and Zhitomir. It withdrew to Szolnok, Hungary, wit 11 aircraft on 23 September, under I Fliegerkorps. On 10 October it had 7 serviceable aircraft from 10 in western Hungary. It remained in Hungary, fighting in the Siege of Budapest and then disbanding in April 1945.

== Commodores ==
- Oberst Hans Behrendt, 1 May 1939 – 21 June 1940
- Oberstleutnant Bernhard Georgi, 22 June 1940 – 17 July 1940 (KIA)
- Oberst Gerhard Conrad, 26 July 1940 – 6 October 1940
- Major Gerhard Ulbricht, November 1940 – December 1941
- Oberst Hans-Henning Freiherr von Beust, January 1942 – 25 November 1943
- Major Karl-August Petersen 29 September 1943 – 4 November 1943
- Oberstleutnant Rudi Kiel, 5 November 1943 – 10 April 1945

== Notes and references ==
=== Bibliography ===
- Bergström, Christer [in Swedish] (2007a). Barbarossa — The Air Battle: July–December 1941. London: Chevron/Ian Allan. ISBN 978-1-85780-270-2.
- Bergström, Christer [in Swedish] (2007b). Stalingrad — The Air Battle: November 1942 – February 1943. London: Chevron/Ian Allan. ISBN 978-1-85780-276-4.
- Bergström, Christer [in Swedish] (2007c). Kursk – The Air Battle: July 1943. Hinkley: Midland Publishing. ISBN 978-1-903223-88-8.
- Bergström, Christer [in Swedish] (2008). Bagration to Berlin – The Final Air Battles in the East: 1944–1945. Ian Allan. ISBN 978-1-903223-91-8.
- Bergström, Christer [in Swedish] (2015). The Battle of Britain: An Epic Conflict Revisited. Oxford, UK: Casemate. ISBN 978-1612-00347-4.
- Cull, Brian; Lander, Bruce; Weiss, Heinrich (1999). Twelve Days in May. London: Grub Street Publishing. ISBN 978-1-90230-412-0.
- de Zeng, Henry; Stankey, Douglas; Creek, Eddie (2007). Bomber Units of the Luftwaffe 1933-1945; A Reference Source Volume 1. Surrey: Ian Allan Publishing. ISBN 978-1-85780-279-5.
- Goss, Chris (2010). The Luftwaffe's Blitz: The Inside Story, November 1940—May 1941. Manchester: Crecy. ISBN 978-0-85979-148-9.
- Hayward, Joel (1998). Stopped At Stalingrad: The Luftwaffe and Hitler's Defeat in the East, 1942-1943. University of Kansas: Lawrence. ISBN 978-0-7006-1146-1.
- Hooton, Edward (1994). Phoenix Triumphant: The Rise and Rise of the Luftwaffe. London: Arms & Armour. ISBN 978-1-86019-964-6.
- Hooton, Edward (2007a). Luftwaffe at War; Gathering Storm, 1933 - 1939. London: Ian Allan. ISBN 978-1-903223-71-0.
- Hooton, Edward (2007b). Luftwaffe at War; Blitzkrieg in the West 1939 - 1940. London: Ian Allan. ISBN 978-1-85780-272-6.
- Mackay, Ron (2003). Heinkel He 111. Ramsbury, Marlborough, Wiltshire, UK: Crowood Press. ISBN 978-1-86126-576-0.
- Mason, Francis (1969). Battle Over Britain. London, UK: McWhirter Twins. ISBN 978-0-901928-00-9.
- Price, Alfred (2010). The Hardest Day: The Battle of Britain: 18 August 1940. London: Haynes Publishing. ISBN 978-1-84425-820-8.

=== Further reading ===
- Bergström, Christer; Mikhailov, Andrey (2001). Black Cross / Red Star—The Air War Over the Eastern Front, Volume II, Resurgence January–June 1942. Pacifica, California: Pacifica Military History. ISBN 978-0-935553-51-2.
- Brooks, Andrew. Air War Over Russia. Ian Allan Publishing. 2003. ISBN 978-0-7110-2890-6
- Dierich, Wolfgang. Kampfgeschwader "Edelweiss" : The history of a German bomber unit, 1935–45. Allan; London. 1975. ISBN 978-0-7110-0601-0
- Echternkamp, Jörg (2014). Germany and the Second World War Volume IX/II: German Wartime Society 1939–1945: Exploitation, Interpretations, Exclusion. Oxford OUP. ISBN 978-0199542963
- Goss, Chris. (2000a). Luftwaffe Fighters and Bombers: The Battle of Britain. Stackpole, London. ISBN 978-0-81170-749-7
- Goss, Chris. (2000b). The Luftwaffe Bombers' Battle of Britain. Crecy, Manchester. ISBN 0-947554-82-3
- Hooton, E.R. (1997). Eagle in Flames: The Fall of the Luftwaffe. Arms & Armour Press. ISBN 1-86019-995-X
- Hooton, E.R. (2016). War over the Steppes: The air campaigns on the Eastern Front 1941–45. Osprey Publishing. ISBN 1472815629
- Jackson, Robert. Air War Over France, 1939–1940. Ian Allan, London. 1974. ISBN 0-7110-0510-9
- James, T.C.G and Cox, Sebastian. The Battle of Britain. Frank Cass, London. 2000. ISBN 978-0-7146-8149-8
- Muller, Richard (1992). The German Air War in Russia. New York: Nautical & Aviation Pub Co of America. ISBN 978-1-877-85313-5.
- Parker, Nigel (2013). Luftwaffe Crash Archive: Volume 1: A Documentary History of Every Enemy Aircraft Brought Down Over the United Kingdom, September 1939 – 14 August 1940. Red Kite, London. ISBN 978-1906592097
