= Poems from the Straight Path =

2017 collection of Islamic poetry by Joel Hayward

Poems from the Straight Path: A Book of Islamic Verse
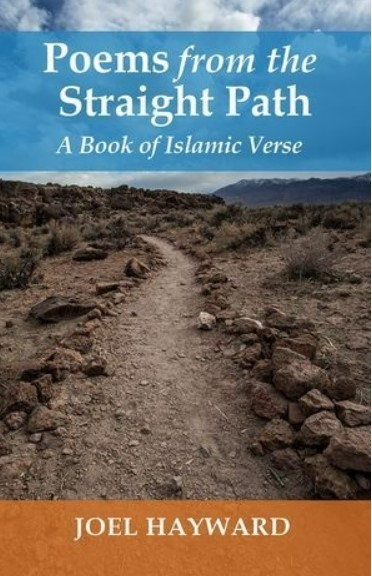
- Front cover
- Author: Joel Hayward
- Language: English
- Subject: Islamic poetry
- Publisher: White Cloud Press
- Publication date: 2017
- Publication place: United Kingdom
- Media type: Softcover
- Pages: 118
- ISBN: 978-1940468532
- OCLC: 957302032

Poems from the Straight Path: A Book of Islamic Verse is a 2017 collection of Islamic poetry by British-New Zealand scholar and poet Joel Hayward. It was Hayward’s third published poetry collection and his twelfth book in general.

== Summary ==
Joel Hayward’s third book of poems, Poems from the Straight Path: A Book of Islamic Verse contains poems about his journey in search of knowledge and wisdom. Poems address issues of life, death, fate, religion, pain, and suffering.

== Reviews ==
Passion Islam’s review states that "Hayward’s journey of exploration, transformation and illumination forms the beating heart of this moving collection of poetry [which is] a timely and important work that reveals the struggle and profound insights of someone bridging cultures and faith traditions."
