= Warfare in the Qur'an =

2012 book on the Islamic ethics of war by Joel Hayward

Warfare in the Qur’an (MABDA English Series Book 14)
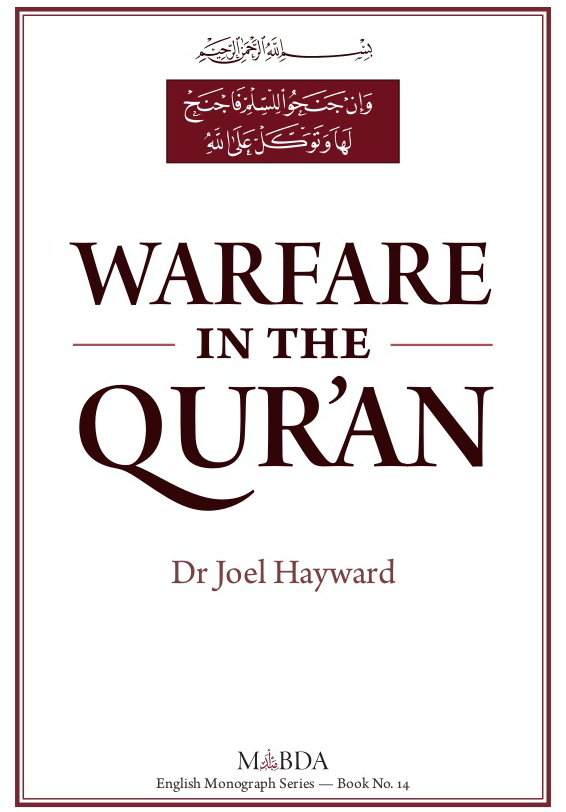
- Front cover
- Author: Joel Hayward
- Language: English
- Subject: Muhammad, warfare, strategy; military history, Quran
- Publisher: Royal Islamic Strategic Studies Centre
- Publication date: 2012
- Publication place: Jordan
- Media type: Softcover
- ISBN: 978-9957-428-50-1
- OCLC: 935225162

Warfare in the Qur’an is a 2012 book on the Islamic ethics of war by New Zealand-born British scholar of strategic studies, Joel Hayward.

== Summary ==
This book outlines and examines what the Qur'an says about the purpose, nature, and morality of war. It is Book 14 in the MABDA English Series, published in Amman, Jordan, by the Royal Islamic Strategic Studies Centre in conjunction with the Royal Aal al-Bayt Institute for Islamic Thought.

== Bosnian translation ==
In 2022, a Bosnian translation was published: Etika rata u islamu (Tuzla: Dialogos, 2022. ISBN 978-9926-8652-2-1).
