= Lifeblood: A Book of Poems =

2003 collection of poetry by Joel Hayward

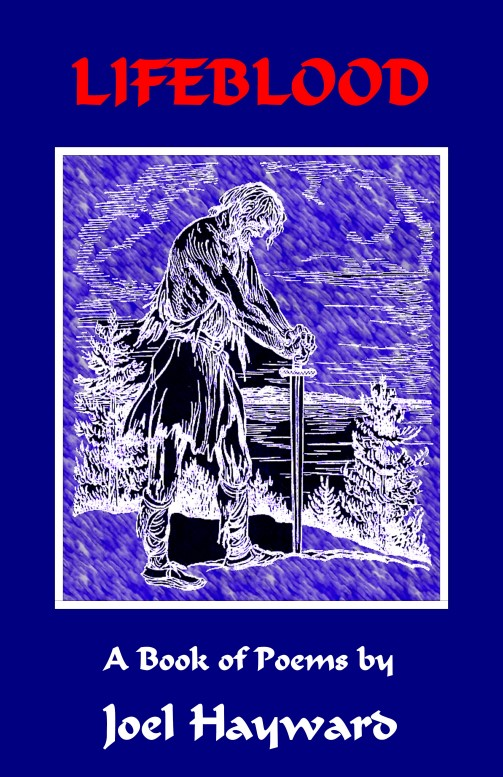
- Front cover
- Author: Joel Hayward
- Language: English
- Subject: poetry
- Publisher: Totem Press
- Publication date: 2003
- Publication place: New Zealand
- Media type: Softcover
- Pages: 100
- ISBN: 0-9582446-1-8

Lifeblood: A Book of Poems is a 2003 collection of poetry by New Zealand-born British scholar and poet Joel Hayward. It was Hayward’s first published poetry collection and his fourth book in general.

== Summary ==
Joel Hayward’s first collection of poems, Lifeblood contains poetry about his journey in search of knowledge and wisdom. Poems address issues of life, death, fate, religion, pain, and suffering.

== Reviews ==
The Evening Standard wrote: "Memorable and insightful. ... Thumbs up for Hayward's work"

Southern Ocean Review said that, "as an academic, and now as a poet and fiction writer, Hayward has achieved much. This is a complex book, and deserves a much longer review. Hayward is at home with the visceral, the cut and thrust of argument, war and death, pain and revenge. ... The poems are racy and innovative, a definite cut above the moderate fare currently on offer. You enter a whole new world when you read Joel Hayward's poetry."

According to Chaff, "Hayward's eclectic poetry reflects his enigmatic mind. ... His poems are passionate and full of rich images and exert a strong and dignified intelligence. Hayward exerts a courageous strength, rebelling against his past creative constraints, and in perhaps a flush of originality and ambitious flair, has achieved a work of art."

The reviewer for the Valley Micropress said: "The author sets out to deliver poetry that is relevant and accessible to the whole community. This he achieves. ... We are treated to a fascinating "OE" from the comfort of our favourite armchair drawn up to the log fire. ... So are you going on a journey? Staying by the fire? Either way you'll find Joel Hayward's Lifeblood a useful addition to your library."
