= For God and Glory =

For God and Glory: Lord Nelson and His Way of War
- Cover of the first edition
- Author: Joel Hayward
- Cover artist: Nicholas Pocock - The Battle of Copenhagen, 2 April 1801
- Subject: Horatio Lord Nelson
- Published: Annapolis, MD: (United States Naval Institute Press), 2003
- Media type: Print (Hardcover)
- Pages: xix, 250 p., [6] p. of plates : ill, maps, ports
- ISBN: 1-59114-351-9
- OCLC: 249090466

For God and Glory: Lord Nelson and His Way of War is a thematic and biographical study of Horatio Lord Nelson's art of war by New Zealand-born British scholar Joel Hayward. It was published by the United States Naval Institute Press in 2003.

== Reception ==
In the Journal of the Society of Nautical Research, Colin White, a leading expert on Nelson, called the book a "fascinating work of strategic philosophy. ... The result is surprisingly persuasive." [Its analyses] "are thought-provoking and, in places, offer fresh ways of understanding what happened." Similarly, in the International Journal of Maritime History, Paul Webb wrote: "This effort by Hayward merits serious attention. ... [It] provides many fresh insights into the workings of Nelson's mind. ... here is no question Hayward has done his work and supports it by solid research. He poses important questions and proffers plausible answers. He clearly admires Nelson, but is quick to recognise his faults and his contradictory character traits. Any serious Nelson student will benefit from this book."

For God and Glory was rated as "outstanding" by members of the 2004 University Press Books Committee, a rating defined "as having exceptional editorial content and subject matter" and considered "essential to most library collections".

== Arabic translation ==
In 2021, it was published as an Arabic translation: لله وللمجد: اللورد نيلسون وأسلوبه في الحرب (عمّان - دار أسامة للنشر والتوزيع، ٢٠٢١)
