= Jenny Green Teeth and other Short Stories =

2003 collection of short stories by Joel Hayward

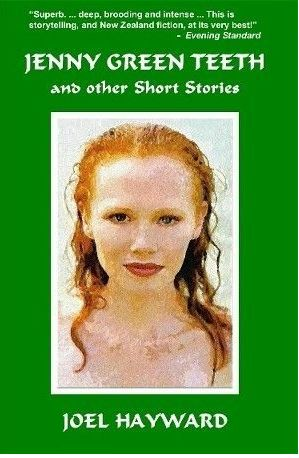
- Front cover
- Author: Joel Hayward
- Language: English
- Subject: fiction
- Publisher: Totem Press
- Publication date: 2003
- Publication place: New Zealand
- Media type: Softcover
- Pages: 153
- ISBN: 9780958244633
- OCLC: 56484190

Jenny Green Teeth and other Short Stories is a 2003 collection of short stories by New Zealand-born British scholar and poet Joel Hayward. It was Hayward's first published book of fiction and his fifth book in general.

== Summary ==
Joel Hayward's first book of fiction is a collection of short stories that draw attention to the ideas of injustice and redemption.

== Reviews ==
The Evening Standard wrote: ""Superb. ... Deep, brooding and intense. ... This is storytelling, and New Zealand fiction, at its best."

Southern Ocean Review said that, "This is a stunning book of short stories, for their sheer variety and depth, and also strength of language. The 'fable' aspect of the title story is compelling and real, not that I will give away any of the plot here! 'My Own Grave,' about the Terrace End Cemetery is scary. It is strange that dead people are treated as so real, but that is the stuff of exciting storytelling. Hayward writes with an eye to truth and justice and historical accuracy. It is up to us to know what to do with writing as superb as this. Can we learn?”

== Arabic translation ==
In 2018, an Arabic translation of this collection was published as: جيني ذات الأسنان الخضراء (Amman: Dar Al-Shorouk, 2018).
