= Splitting the Moon: A Collection of Islamic Poetry =

2012 poetry collection by Joel Hayward

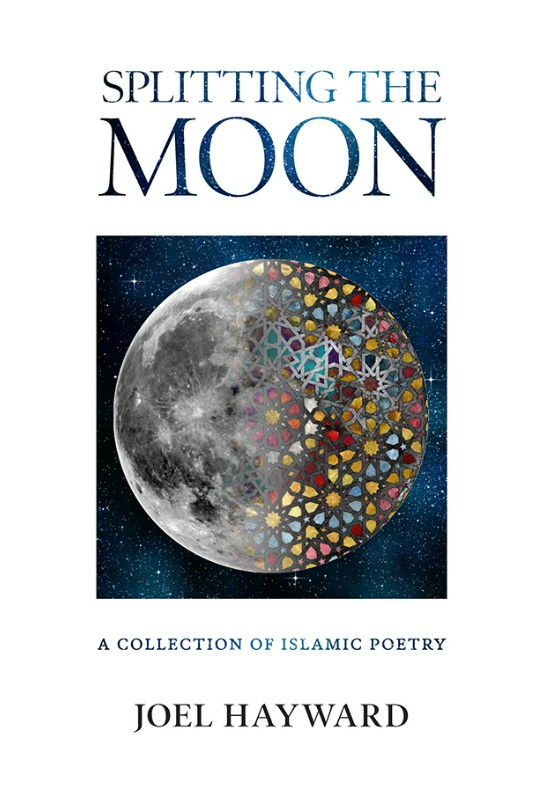
- Front cover
- Author: Joel Hayward
- Language: English
- Subject: Islamic poetry
- Publisher: Kube Publishing
- Publication date: 2012
- Publication place: United Kingdom
- Media type: Softcover
- Pages: 128
- ISBN: 978-1847740342
- OCLC: 785895381

Splitting the Moon: A Collection of Islamic Poetry is a 2012 book of Islamic poetry by New Zealand-born British scholar and poet Joel Hayward. It was Hayward's second published poetry collection and his eighth book in general.

== Summary ==
Joel Hayward's second collection of poems, Splitting the Moon reflects, chronicles and tries to make sense of his conversion to Islam after living uncomfortably as a Unitarian within a trinitarian Christian world. As Muslims struggle to adapt to modernity, Hayward offers poetic commentary on the problems they face. He is particularly critical of the violence and terrorism committed in the name of the religion he chose.

== Reviews ==
"[Joel Hayward] is a very skilful and gifted poet whose way with words is impressive. His poems are easy to understand, highly pertinent and equally spiritually profound, that is to say, this collection of poems are much more than poetry; they also provide a powerful commentary on the social, political, moral and religious challenges and difficulties currently facing Muslims and non-Muslims alike. The fact that he is able to do this in an elegant, evocative and inspiring way is an added bonus. ... The poem titled The Voyage of a Scholar ... is a beautiful example of how the poet is able to blend the personal, emotional, spiritual and existential dimensions of human experience, and do so without in any way over-playing or undermining any aspect. This is a very rare skill for a poet to possess. ...
