= Born to Lead? Portraits of New Zealand Commanders =

2003 book on military leadership by Glyn Harper and Joel Hayward

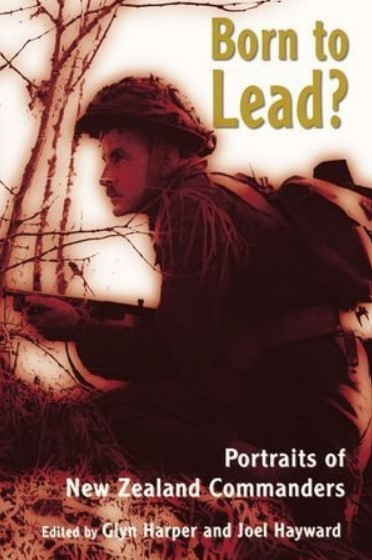
- Front cover
- Author: Glyn Harper and Joel Hayward
- Language: English
- Subject: Military history
- Publisher: Exisle Press
- Publication date: 2003
- Publication place: New Zealand
- Media type: Softcover
- Pages: 252
- ISBN: 9780908988334
- OCLC: 53896876

Born to Lead? Portraits of New Zealand Commanders is a 2003 book on the leadership of New Zealand military commanders by historians Glyn Harper and Joel Hayward.

== Summary ==
The leadership qualities and techniques used by New Zealand military commanders from the Boer War to the 2000s are described and analyzed in this book.

== Reception ==
The New Zealand Army News review called the book "very readable” and said that it "is an important contribution to our military history studies and to the study of the special nature of New Zealand command. For the potential leader it provides practical insights, but it has a wider audience. Be you student, historian or interested Kiwi, you will find this book is well worth reading."

In its positive review, The Press said: "This is a ground-breaking collection of essays. ... All concerned, writers and editors, must be congratulated on the clarity and freshness of these essays. They are readable and well organised; there is no jargon and even the picture captions are interesting. Born to Lead? is inspirational".

In his review in the Whanganui Chronicle, Daniel Jackson said that "the book succeeds in giving a small window into the officers of the past. It tackles an ambitious subject by trying to explore whether New Zealand's armed forces have a leadership style. In doing so [it] provides a good reference to the leaders of our military past and how our military was shaped. It was good for a civilian like me to learn how our military leaders handled our civilian soldiers. The subject is still very relevant to all New Zealanders as war plans still call for the conscription and mobilisation of civilians if we are ever faced with a serious threat."
