= Gerhard Conrad (pilot) =

- Born: 21 April 1895
- Died: 28 May 1982 (aged 87)
- Military career
- Allegiance: German Empire; Weimar Republic; Nazi Germany
- Branch: Prussian Army; Reichsheer; Luftwaffe
- Service years: 1914–1945
- Rank: Generalleutnant
- Commands: Kampfgeschwader 27
- Conflicts: World War II
- Awards: Knight's Cross of the Iron Cross

Gerhard Conrad (21 April 1895 – 28 May 1982) was a general in the Luftwaffe of Nazi Germany during World War II. He was a recipient of the Knight's Cross of the Iron Cross.

== Awards and decorations ==
- Knight's Cross of the Iron Cross on 24 May 1940 as Oberst and Geschwaderkommodore of Kampfgeschwader z.b.V. 2

Military offices
Preceded by None	Commander of Kampfgeschwader zbV 2; 1 September 1939 – 26 July 1940	Succeeded by Oberst Rüdiger von Heyking
Preceded by Oberstleutnant Bernhard Georgi	Commander of Kampfgeschwader 27 "Boelcke"; 26 July 1940 – 6 October 1940	Succeeded by Major Gerhard Ulbricht
