= The Leadership of Muhammad =

2021 biography by Joel Hayward

The Leadership of Muhammad: A Historical Reconstruction
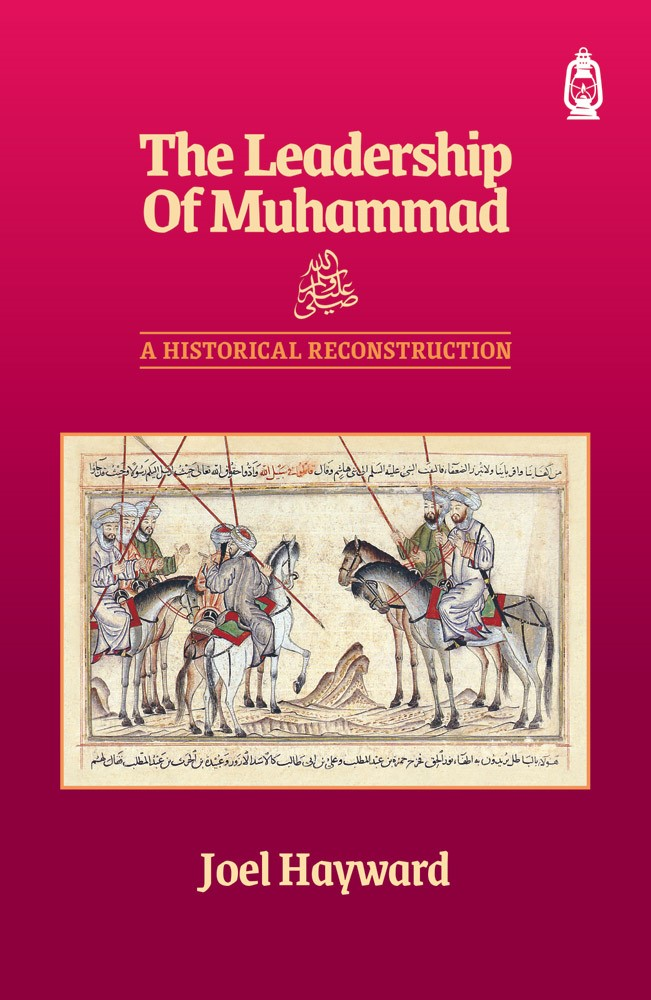
- Front cover from the first edition, 2021
- Author: Joel Hayward
- Language: English
- Subject: Muhammad
- Publisher: Claritas Books
- Publication date: 2021
- Publication place: United Kingdom
- Media type: Hardcover)
- Pages: 179
- ISBN: 978-180011-989-5

The Leadership of Muhammad: A Historical Reconstruction is a 2021 biographical book about the leadership of the Islamic prophet Muhammad by British-New Zealand Islamic scholar Joel Hayward.

== Summary ==
Rather than look at Muhammad's traits or his moral character for the explanation — in other words, at how Muhammad was — Hayward focused on what Muhammad thought and did while leading in order to ascertain whether his concepts, actions and habits reveal substantial and meaningful insights into the effectiveness of his leadership. Hayward investigated what the earliest extant Arabic sources reveal about Muhammad's capacity and aptitude for leadership in order to make a determination as to whether, and to what degree, Muhammad consciously acted in ways that produced positive results, especially the results he actually sought, during his twenty-three years as a leader.

== Award ==
The Leadership of Muhammad was awarded the prize of Best International Non-Fiction Book at the 2021 Sharjah International Book Awards.

== Reviews ==
Kirkus Reviews said that Hayward, who is "undeniably one of academia’s most visible Islamic thinkers," had produced "a learned history of Islam and Muhammad that succeeds in its goal of providing contemporary and future managers with valuable insights from his life on successful leadership strategies". Kirkus praised the book's "full command of Islamic theology and the Arabic language as well as its rich endnotes," and concluded that it "eschews academic and religious jargon for an accessible narrative geared toward the general public, both Muslim and non-Muslim."

According to a review in Critical Muslim, "The Leadership of Muhammad is a much-needed antidote to our collective failure to understand, engage with or emulate the Prophetic model of leadership. In our complex and troubled world Hayward’s systematic explanation of the nature of the Prophet’s leadership makes complete sense while at the same time requires the questioning of every kind of leadership claim made by Muslim politicians and theologians certainly in our times. … The Leadership of Muhammad is original, insightful and intellectually enriching. It deserves a wide readership, both of Muslims and non-Muslims. If read carefully and its insights applied judiciously, it will transform the reader’s own leadership abilities."

The Muslim World Book Review said: "The appearance of any work by British-New Zealand scholar Joel Hayward is a matter of interest and significance for those interested in history, but the breadth, scholarship and intellectual ambition of this tome make it of particular importance. … his sources are impeccable and his interpretation irreproachable. This engrossing and sympathetic study portrays the Prophet as a highly competent and reliable human being possessed of significant political and spiritual talents. … The book is wall to wall strengths. … This volume is very intensive and disciplined, compact but with a remarkably comprehensive interior. … This book is an accessible and comprehensive presentation of a complicated issue and the author successfully combines an expert account of the biography of the Prophet with a knowledgeable investigation on the subject of efficacious leadership. … I found this book absorbing, vivid, and stimulating. This is an essential addition to the literature for both students and the general reader."

The San Francisco Book Review wrote that Hayward is a "celebrated historian and strategic studies scholar", called The Leadership of Muhammad a "ground breaking book", and awarded it five stars out of five. Reviewer Foluso Falaye described the book as "a great source of knowledge about Muhammad and the beginning of Islam." He wrote that its "critical approach will appeal to academic minds, although the language is simple and direct enough to carry all readers along." He added that, "in addition to being historically informative, it offers valuable lessons about leadership that could help world leaders, decision makers, teachers, and people from all walks of life to communicate and lead better."

== Translations ==
=== Bosnian ===
In 2022, a Bosnian translation appeared: Muhammed kao lider: historijska rekonstrukcija (Tuzla: Dialogos, 2022). ISBN 978-9926-8652-0-7.

=== Arabic ===
In 2023, an Arabic translation appeared: قيادة محمد ﷺ إعادة بناء تاريخي (Amman: Dar Al-Shorouk, 2023).

=== Turkish ===
In 2024, a Turkish translation appeared: Hz. Muhammed'in Liderliği: Peygamberimizin Siyasi, Askerî ve Sosyal Hayatta Yol Göstericiliği. Ankara, Turkey: Pelikan Kitabevi. ISBN 9786256021976.

=== Bahasa Indonesian ===
In 2025, a Bahasa Indonesian translation appeared: The Leadership of Muhammad: Kepemimpinan Muhammad dalam Rekonstruksi Sejarah. Jakarta, Indonesia: Quanta. ISBN 9786230070426.

== See also ==
- Prophetic biography
- List of biographies of Muhammad
