= Hans-Henning Freiherr von Beust =

- Born: 17 April 1913; Karlsruhe
- Died: 27 March 1991 (aged 77); Munich
- Military career
- Allegiance: Nazi Germany; West Germany
- Branch: Luftwaffe
- Rank: Oberst
- Unit: Condor Legion
- Commands: Kampfgeschwader 27
- Conflicts: See battles * Spanish Civil War World War II: Invasion of Poland; Battle of Belgium; Battle of France; Battle of Dunkirk; Battle of Britain; Operation Barbarossa; Siege of Odessa (1941); Siege of Sevastopol (1941–1942); Battle of Stalingrad; Battle of Kursk; Lower Dnieper Offensive
- Awards: Knight's Cross of the Iron Cross with Oak Leaves

Hans-Henning Freiherr von Beust (17 April 1913 – 27 March 1991) was an officer in the Luftwaffe of Nazi Germany during World War II who commanded the 27th Bomber Wing. He was a recipient of the Knight's Cross of the Iron Cross with Oak Leaves. Beust joined the Bundeswehr in 1957 and retired in 1971.

== Awards and decorations ==
- Iron Cross (1939) 2nd Class (16 September 1939) & 1st Class (23 June 1940)
- German Cross in Gold on 10 May 1943 as Major in Kampfgeschwader 27
- Knight's Cross of the Iron Cross with Oak Leaves
  - Knight's Cross on 17 September 1941 as Hauptmann and Gruppenkommandeur of the III./Kampfgeschwader 27 "Boelcke"
  - 336th Oak Leaves on 25 November 1943 as Oberstleutnant and Geschwaderkommodore of Kampfgeschwader 27 "Boelcke"

Military offices
Preceded by Major Gerhard Ulbricht	Commander of Kampfgeschwader 27; 1 March 1942 – November 1943	Succeeded by Major Rudi Kiel
