= The Warrior Prophet: Muhammad and War =

2022 book on the warfare of Muhammad by Joel Hayward

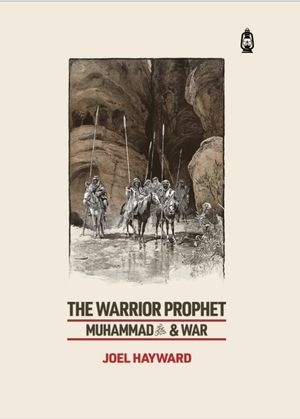
- Front cover from the first edition, 2022
- Author: Joel Hayward
- Language: English
- Subject: Muhammad, warfare, strategy; military history
- Publisher: Claritas Books
- Publication date: 2022
- Publication place: United Kingdom
- Media type: Hardcover
- Pages: 457
- ISBN: 9781800119802

The Warrior Prophet: Muhammad and War is a 2022 biographical book by British-New Zealand Islamic scholar Joel Hayward about the Islamic prophet Muhammad’s understanding of warfare and strategy.

== Summary ==
Hayward has been noted for weaving together “classical Islamic knowledge and methodologies and the source-critical Western historical method to make innovative yet carefully reasoned sense of complex historical issues". The Warrior Prophet: Muhammad and War is his latest book to use this approach. The book eschews the traditional Islamic explanation that Muhammad excelled at warfare simply because he was a prophet and was therefore good at everything. Hayward argues that this incomplete explanation ignores Muhammad's agency and hides his human aptitude and brilliance. Muhammad, he argues, was himself an astute and skilled strategist and warrior who understood the necessity of warfare as well as its transformational power. At 457 pages, it took Hayward "about a decade of on-and-off work to complete."

== Reviews ==
Kirkis Reviews concludes that, "at more than 450 dense pages, the book may be overwhelming to those unfamiliar with Islamic history, though ample reading aids (from maps and charts to timelines and a glossary) are provided. With almost 1,500 endnotes, this is a remarkably well-researched book that has a solid grasp on both contemporary scholarship as well as Arabic primary sources."

A five-star BookViral review states: “Joel Hayward sets aside religious fervor and hearsay in his impeccably and intensively researched book, The Warrior Prophet: Muhammad and War. Rather than offering sentimentality and thinly veiled assumptions, it represents a comprehensive and evidence-based historical account of the Prophet Muhammad ... Hayward’s tireless study is evidenced in his superbly executed academic writing, as he brings together the threads of past documentation and artefacts, shaping his words into a fully rounded account. With the fascinating backdrop of customs, practices and beliefs of the peoples of that time period, Hayward brings the Prophet Muhammad to life, focusing on his motivations and movements as he wielded great strength and power throughout the east, fighting alongside his soldiers in his God-ordained role. ... Complete with comprehensive and extensive referencing, The warrior Prophet: Muhammad and War is unreservedly recommended as a historically accurate fully researched work detailing the life and times of the Prophet Muhammad.

In a five-star review, Philip Zozzaro of the Manhattan Book Review called The Warrior Prophet "convincing and thought-provoking" and stated that "Hayward contributes a well-researched and annotated study" that "doesn’t narrowly focus on wins and losses for Muhammad and his disciples but also delves into the guiding philosophies that Islam teaches. Hayward’s book will open the eyes of history devotees as well as those who are well-versed in the life of the esteemed prophet/leader."

In The Muslim World Book Review, 44:2 (2024, pp. 22–25) reviewer Abdullah Drury highly praised The Warrior Prophet as a "brilliant and robustly intellectual tome" and "an excellent piece of writing". He noted that the author "is highly critical of modern hagiography … and tears strips away from such texts with the skill of a butcher preparing shish kebab." He further asserted: "Hayward might well be the most distinguished writer on this topic today – he is simultaneously erudite, politically incorrect and inordinately talented. Few other authors unmask the pseudo-pieties of the ruling cant of our era and whether the reader agrees or disagrees with the mechanical details or conclusions of his thesis, Hayward performs an invaluable service to scholarship."

== See also ==
- Prophetic biography
- List of biographies of Muhammad
