= Kalamaki, Patras =

Kalamaki (Greek: Καλαμάκι, meaning "small cane" or "straw") is a neighbourhood in the city of Patras, Achaea, Greece.
