= Stopped at Stalingrad =

1998 book by Joel Hayward

- Cover of the first edition
- Author: Joel Hayward
- Language: English
- Subject: Battle of Stalingrad
- Publisher: University Press of Kansas
- Publication date: 1998
- Publication place: United States
- Media type: Print (Paperback and Hardcover)
- Pages: 393 (Paperback)
- ISBN: 0-7006-1146-0
- OCLC: 37226814

Stopped at Stalingrad: The Luftwaffe and Hitler's Defeat in the East, 1942–1943 is a 1998 book about the Battle of Stalingrad by British scholar Joel Hayward.

== Summary ==
Hayward analyzes the role of Adolf Hitler's use and control of the Luftwaffe in the Battle of Stalingrad between Nazi Germany and the Soviet Union during World War II. Hayward discusses at length the various reasons for Hitler's invasion, the consequences, the major battles of the Eastern Front and the role of the Luftwaffe in these areas, along with the hierarchy of the Luftwaffe itself. He deals with how Hitler's control of the Luftwaffe during this battle ultimately led to the German loss at the Battle of Stalingrad, the turning point against the Germans in World War II.

== Publication history ==
Stopped at Stalingrad was published by University Press of Kansas in 1998.

== Polish translation ==
Zatrzymani pod Stalingradem. Klęska Luftwaffe i Hitlera na wschodzie 1942-1943 (Warsaw: Wydawnictwo Napoleon V, 2015).

== Reviews ==
"... an original and formidably researched study ... Stopped at Stalingrad is an absolutely indispensable work not only for its revelations about Stalingrad, but equally for a more complete understanding of the nature of Soviet-German operations in a critical year." — Professor John Erickson, RUSI Journal, June 1998, p. 80.

Charles Messenger, ed., Readers Guide to Military History (Chicago, Il: Fitzroy Dearborn, 2001) describes the book as "a magnificently researched study … [which] provides the best available account of the disastrous Stalingrad airlift." The book is "an advanced and exhaustive work that will become a standard in the field once it is better known." (pp. 740, 765)

"This is a superb piece of work. It is an absolute must for anyone with an interest in the war on the eastern front, and on the Stalingrad campaign in particular. ... The book is splendidly researched and well written. Hayward has the knack of being able to explain even very technical matters in easily understood prose." — Professor Richard L. DiNardo, New York Military Affairs Symposium Newsletter, Fall 1998, pp. 4–5.

"Hayward's research is impeccable . ... His tri-dimensional [i.e., joint service] treatments of the Crimean campaign, the siege and capture of Sevastopol, and the air-ground actions during the Battle of Stalingrad are perhaps the best available anywhere. ... His examination of the Stalingrad airlift is also first rate, and provides an unparalleled view of the operation from the air fleet headquarters' perspective.... Hayward's rendering is an important contribution to the airpower history of World War II." — Professor Richard Muller, The Journal of Military History, October 1998, pp. 951–952.

"The great merit of this excellent account is to remind historians that this was not just a ground struggle, but an air war as well. ... Hayward has used a remarkably wide range of sources, which he handles with exceptional deftness and critical detachment. He writes clearly and interestingly. ...This is a model of its kind, which ought to set an agenda for the reconstruction of the air narrative in this and other theatres in the greatest of air wars." - Professor Richard Overy, War in History, Vol. 8 No. 1 (2001), pp. 123–125.

=== In academic journals ===
(alphabetical by journal)

- Herman Reinhold, in [US Air Force] Aerospace Power Journal, Volume XVI, No. 1 (Spring 2002), pp. 122–123 " shows his mastery of the subject"
- P.L.de Rosa in CHOICE: Current Reviews for Academic Libraries Oct 1998 v36 n2 p374(2)
- Larry L. Ping, in German Studies Review, Vol. 23, No. 2 (May, 2000), pp. 372–373 doi:10.2307/1432710 (access through JStor)
- by Russell Lemmons in History, Fall 1998, p. 27
- Earl F. Ziemke, in The International History Review, Vol. XXI, No. 1 (March 1999), p. 220.
- Richard R. Muller, in The Journal of Military History, Vol. 62, No. 4 (Oct., 1998), pp. 951–952 doi:10.2307/120227 (access through JStor) "Hayward's rendering is an important contribution to the airpower history of World War II."
- Overy, in War In History. 2001; 8: 123-125 (Sage Publishers site) "model of its kind"
- John Erickson, RUSI Journal "an original and formidably researched study"

=== In non-academic journals ===
- Omer Bartov, Times Literary Supplement Oct 23, 1998 n4986 p12(2) "Hayward makes a convincing case"
