= Royal Air Force Centre for Air & Space Power Studies =

UK-based think tank

The Royal Air Force Centre for Air and Space Power Studies (RAF CASPS), known as the Royal Air Force Centre for Air Power Studies (RAF CAPS) until 2019 is a Royal Air Force sponsored think tank which engages in the study of air power.

The centre was launched on 23 August 2007 by Air Chief Marshal Sir Glenn Torpy, Chief of the Air Staff. Originally based at the Royal Air Force College, the Centre subsequently moved to the Defence Academy of the UK at Shrivenham operating under the leadership of the Director, Defence Studies RAF. The Centre brings together serving members of the RAF and air and space power academics from the UK and around the world to analyse how air and space power have been used in the past and the way in which it is used in the modern world. It aims to act as the RAF’s centre for strategic and conceptual thinking about air power, to "encourage and promote the study of air power, particularly within the Service and academia, but also throughout the broader intellectual community (including the media and think-tanks)."

The centre hosts a website, runs major conferences, most notably the annual Global Air Chiefs conference in conjunction with the Air and Space Power Association,offers fellowships and, in 2008 took over responsibility for the journal now known as Air & Space Power Review (Air Power Review until Volume 22, 2019). Its board is headed by the Air Officer Commanding No. 22 (Training) Group. The small staff consists of members of the Directorate of Defence Studies RAF, led by a trio of Directors in the form of the Director of Defence Studies, RAF, the Head of the Air Historical Branch (RAF), and Dr David Jordan of King's College London.

RAF CASPS also oversaw the Chief of the Air Staff's Air Power Workshop, sometimes known as the CAS Workshop, which acts as a means of drawing together small essentially ad hoc working groups of air power practitioners and academics working in the field. The Workshop's original aim was to develop and debate cutting-edge ideas on air power, engaging a wide range of practitioners and academics. Its outputs have included articles in Air and Space Power Review and occasional books on air and space power matters, printed both by official sources and in conjunction with commercial publishers. The evolution of the Air and Space Warfare Centre (ASWC) and theTedder Academy of Leadershiphas seen much of the CAS Workshop's role in doctrinal development and air contemporary air power become more formalised under the auspices of those two organisations.
