= Airpower =

Concept of military aviation

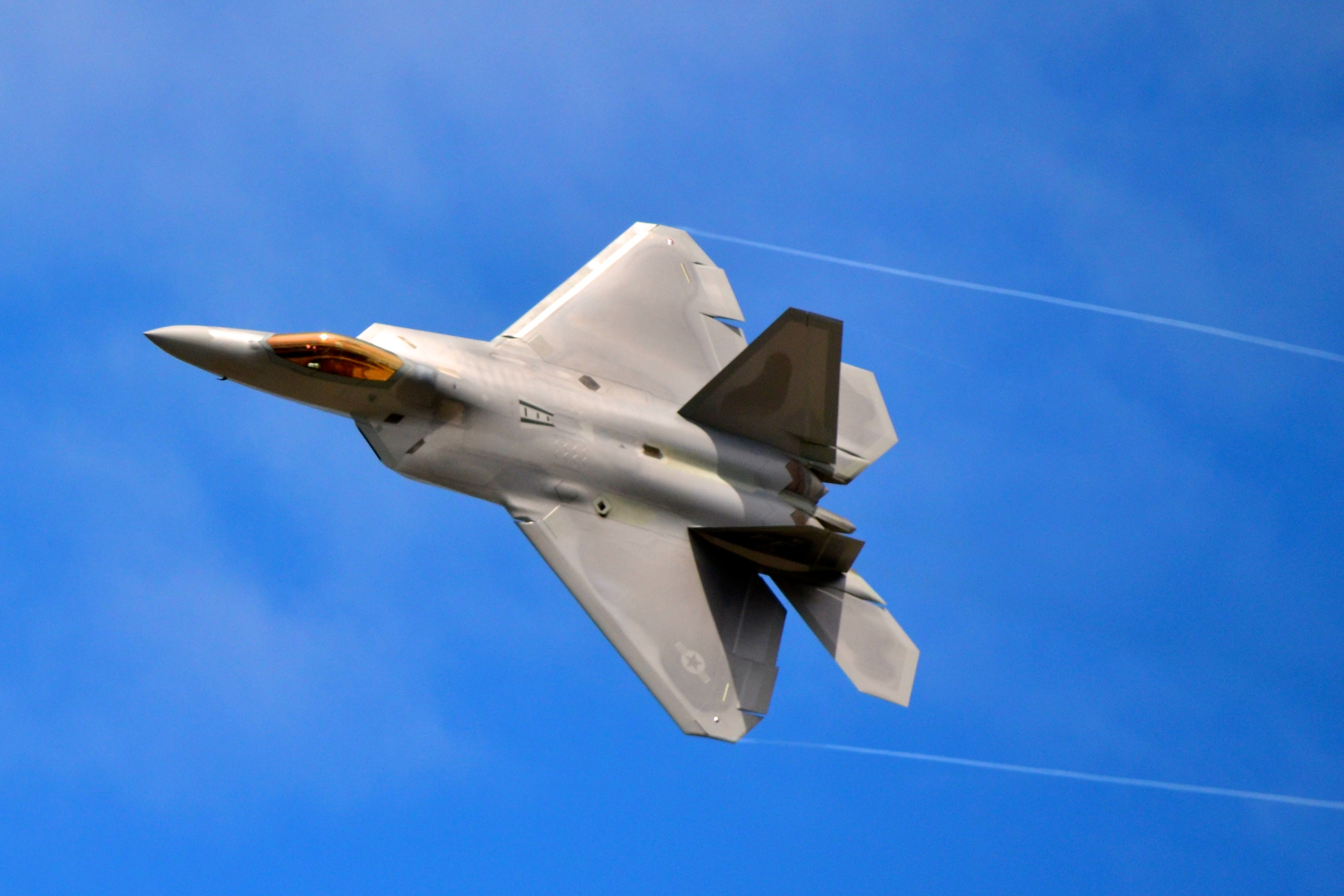
The USAF's F-22 Raptor air superiority fighter

Airpower or air power consists of the application of military aviation, military strategy and strategic theory to the realm of aerial warfare and close air support. Airpower began with the advent of powered flight early in the 20th century. Airpower represents a "complex operating environment that has been subjected to considerable debate". British doctrine defines airpower as "the ability to project power from the air and space to influence the behaviour of people or the course of events." The Australian Experience of Air Power defines Airpower as being composed of Control of the Air, Strike, Intelligence Surveillance and Reconnaissance, and Air Mobility roles.

== Definition ==
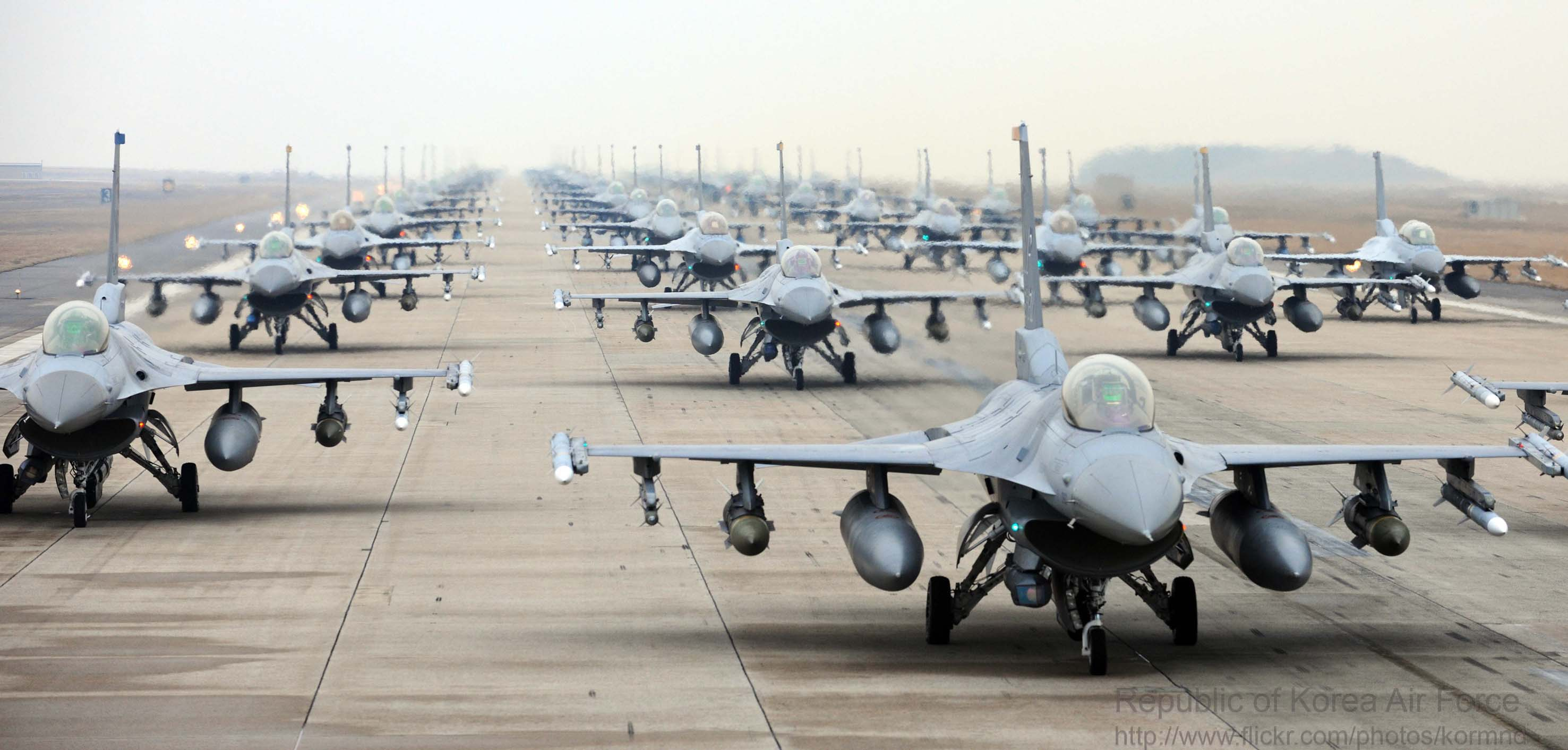
Numerous ROKAF's F-16 Fighting Falcon jet fighters on a runway

Airpower can be considered a function of air supremacy and numbers. Roughly speaking, a combatant side that has 100% or near 100% control of the skies has air supremacy; an advantage of some 70–90% would indicate air superiority. A 50/50 split is air parity; lower than this, one side may be said to be air denied or air incapable. Because aeroplanes generally take off from designed airfields on missions typically involving some hours of cruising, the precise state of air superiority is fluid and less defined vis-a-vis land or sea warfare. For example, a contested airspace directly above a battlespace bristling with anti-aircraft weapons may be denied to the air forces of both sides. Further, the completely different situations of a technologically advanced airforce with one flight of high-tech planes (air supremacy but low capacity) or a low-tech force of massive numbers of low-tech planes (e.g., An-2) resulting in high capacity but low long-term survivability demonstrate that 'air power' is multi-faceted and complex.

Significant contributors to theorizing about air power have been Giulio Douhet, Billy Mitchell, John Boyd and John A. Warden III.

At the start of World War I, opinions differed on the national air forces and the value of airships. Some early strategists/visionaries after World War I imagined that airpower alone would suffice to bring nations to their knees. The Bombing of Guernica was an early trial that revealed both capabilities and limitations. But yet another maxim, "no war was ever won solely by airpower" was challenged by the NATO victory in Kosovo. Airpower has been used to conduct lightning strategic strikes, to complement land offensives, to instill fear and lower morale similarly to a fleet in being, and to create broad-based destruction behind enemy lines. With airpower, supplies can be transported by cargo planes, providing a decisive edge in mobility.

Military and civilian aircraft interact in a number of complex ways, including shootdowns of civilian planes, whether mistaken or not; military escorts of civilian planes; civilian planes being used for military transport, espionage, or other purposes; and/or no-fly zones being enforced to punish or sanction a target nation. Airpower also relates to space power, although militarization of space remains regulated by international treaty.

Developed nations have enjoyed a consistent advantage in airpower since the beginning of mechanized flight. Airpower has been wielded mostly decisively in the last hundred years by Nazi Germany, the United Kingdom, the United States, the Soviet Union, Japan, Italy, and France, with many client nations using aircraft developed by one or more of these nations. A mass technological base is considered necessary for the development of airpower.

As early as 1921, air power doctrines were being actively debated in British India, with key arguments around flexibility, psychological impact, and deterrence being articulated by military theorists. These ideas, though born in the colonial era, later influenced independent air forces like the IAF. A retrospective analysis of these early insights and their enduring relevance has been published.

== See also ==
- Aerial warfare
