= Kampfgeschwader 54 =

- Unit insignia
- Active: 1939–1945
- Country: Nazi Germany
- Branch: Luftwaffe
- Type: Bomber Wing
- Role: Air interdiction close air support Offensive counter air Maritime interdiction Strategic bombing
- Size: Air Force Wing
- Nickname: Totenkopf (Death's Head)
- Engagements: World War II

Insignia
- Identification symbol: Geschwaderkennung of B3

Kampfgeschwader 54 "Totenkopf" (German pronunciation: [kampfɡəʃvaːdɐ fiːɐ ʊntfʏnftsɪç], KG 54) was a Luftwaffe bomber wing during World War II. It served on nearly all the fronts in the European Theatre where the German Luftwaffe operated.

KG 54 was formed in May 1939. The bomber wing was equipped with two of the major German medium bomber types; the Heinkel He 111 and the Junkers Ju 88. It was given the insignia of a human skull and crossbones, with the bones significantly crossed behind the skull. This insignia for the entire bomber wing was sometimes displayed on a shield-like device, but more often depicted over a normal camouflage pattern. It bore a strikingly close graphic resemblance to that of the 3rd SS Panzer Division, known as the "Death's Head Division". The Totenkopf motif was inspired by the Braunschweiger Black Hussars.

KG 54 began its first campaign in September 1939 when German forces invaded Poland, which began World War II. It spent the Phoney War resting and refitting though it did carry out leaflet-dropping over France. In April 1940, KG 54 briefly supported the Operation Weserübung, the invasions of Denmark and Norway. In May 1940, KG 54 played a critical and controversial role in Fall Gelb, the German offensive into Western Europe. On 14 May 1940, as the Battle of the Netherlands reached a climax, KG 54 carried out the Rotterdam Blitz, which destroyed the centre of the city and killed many civilians. The attack played a role in the surrender of the Dutch Army. KG 54 continued to support German forces in the Battle of Belgium and Battle of France through to the surrender of the latter in June 1940.

From July 1940 it fought in the Battle of Britain sustaining considerable losses and thereafter in The Blitz. KG 54 also provided tertiary support to the Kriegsmarine, German Navy, the Battle of the Atlantic. From June 1941 to October 1942 it fought on the Eastern Front after Operation Barbarossa and the invasion of the Soviet Union. In 1943 it served in the Mediterranean, Middle East and African theatres of war. KG 54 fought on the Italian Front and participated in Operation Steinbock over England. It supported German forces in the night intruder role over the beachheads in June 1944 and served on the Western Front until October 1944, when the last of its bomber groups was disbanded. Some were converted into fighter groups, and continued to operate into 1945.

KG 54's attack on Rotterdam in May 1940 has occasioned accusations of war crimes but no criminal charges were ever filed against the wing's officers or any senior officer commander at corps or air fleet level. The bombing was discussed at the Nuremberg trials in relation to the conduct of senior Luftwaffe commanders, particularly Hermann Göring, commander in chief of the Luftwaffe and Albert Kesselring, commander of Luftflotte 2, to which KG 54 was attached. The decision to bomb the city remains controversial. The Dutch decision not to declare Rotterdam an open city played a part in the attack. Although KG 54 was used as an offensive tool supporting a war of aggression, the city was a combat zone and the bombing did not violate the then valid Hague Convention on Land Warfare, 1907.

== History ==
Kampfgeschwader 54 was formed on 1 May 1939 at Fritzlar by reforming Stab./KG 254. The new Geschwader (wing) was placed under the command of Luftflotte 3. Oberst Walter Lackner became KG 54's first Geschwaderkommodore. The medium bomber unit was allotted the Heinkel He 111. I. Gruppe was created the same day at Fritzlar with the He 111P. The late creation of KG 54 necessitated intensive training in the spring and summer 1939. I./KG 54 was placed under the command of Gruppenkommandeur Major Otto Höhne. The Gruppe undertook long-range flights at high altitudes for crews to gain experience. Flights were made to Seville, Spain and Tripoli in Libya.

II. Gruppe was not formed until 15 December 1939 near Hoya, southeast of Bremen after the war had started. The group was formed from II./KG 28 and was handed the former's He 111Ps. It transferred from Hoya to Oldenburg for training in January 1940. It may have some contribution, or transfer of personnel to III./KG 54 prior to 1 February. The Gruppe was training under Luftflotte 2 during the winter and relocated to Celle in March 1940.

III. Gruppe was formed on 1 February 1940 at Wiener Neustadt, Austria. The He 111P was used to equip the group and received aircraft and crews from I. and II./KG 54 as well and crews from training programs. By mid-March the Gruppe was fully formed and was training at Celle from 18 to 31 March 1940, as Bissel 1–7 April, at Vechta from 8 April–16 May 1940. Part of the operational training exercise was to fly airborne leaflet propaganda over northeastern France. Major Adolf Häring was the group's first commanding officer.

== Wartime service ==
=== Poland, Denmark, Norway and the Phoney War ===
On 1 September 1939, Fall Weiss, the invasion of Poland, beginning the war in Europe. I./KG 54 was based at Fritzlar with 30 operational aircraft from 33. It was placed under the command of the 3rd Fliegerdivision, subordinated to Luftflotte 2. Only 2 Staffel participated in the invasion. Stab./KG 54 had eight of nine bombers operational but took no active role either. 2. Staffel was moved to Seerappen, East Prussia on 8 September and to Königsberg sometime in September. It supported Army Group North, the advance to Warsaw (8–20 September), and the participated in the attacks on the city.

On 10 September 1939 it was engaged in attacks on troop concentrations north of Praha, and bombed Polish Army forces east of Brześć Litewski on 15 September as the Battle of Brześć Litewski raged. The rest of the unit did not participate during the campaign. I./KG 54 was withdrawn on 20 September and put on standby in western Germany, in case of Western Allied attacks, which aside from a token advance into German territory, did not materialise. Poland capitulated in the first week of October 1939.

II./KG 54 had been sitting idle since formation. It transferred to Celle and was put under the command of X. Fliegerkorps, which was in turn, subordinated to Luftflotte 2. The Gruppe began Operation Weserübung, the invasion of Denmark and Norway, on the eleventh day. On 20 April 1940 it was hastily redeployed to Aalborg in northern Denmark. From here it flew armed reconnaissance in the battle for Namsos and Steinkjer. In Namsos fjord it attack to warships. The Royal New Zealand Navy sloop Auckland, the Royal Navy destroyer Nubian and cruiser Birmingham and Calcutta, plus the French Navy destroyers Bison and Foudroyant with the troopship Ville D'Alger, were present in the harbour this day. The following day, bombed the Trondheim to Steinkjer rail line. On 23 April II./KG 54 persisted with targeting rail links at Dombås-Åndalsnes-Vaalebru. From 25 April–1 May 1940 it flew armed reconnaissance against rail communications in Central Norway. Åndalsnes was subjected to two attacks on 27 and 28 April. The Gruppe also attacked Dombås railway station on 26 May, and retreating British forces at Namos on 1 May. II./KG 54 returned to Germany on 2 May 1940.

I. and III./KG 54 spent the spring in training as the Phoney War continued. KG 54 was sent to Albert Kesselring's Luftflotte 2 as reinforcement for Fall Gelb, the German western offensive. Kesselring was given KG 54 with LG 1 to act as support to Army Group B. Stab./KG 54 was based at Quakenbrück on 15 February 1940. It was here the Totenkopf of the Braunschweiger Black Hussars was chosen for the Geschwader motif.

By May 1940, KG 54 could muster three Gruppen and a stab unit. Stab./KG 54 had on strength six He 111Ps, with four operational, and a single He 111D, not operational at Quakenbrück. It was subordinated to Albert Kesselring and Luftflotte 2. I./KG 54 was based at Quakenbrück also. The Gruppe fielded 36 (33 operational) He 111Ps. II./KG 54 had 29 bombers with all but three operational at Varrelbusch. III./KG 54 was stationed at Cologne and Ostheim. It was given 35 bombers for the offensive and 27 were combat ready on A-Day, 10 May 1940.

=== France and the Low Countries ===
Operation Fall Gelb began on 9 May 1940, with preliminary minelaying operations beginning before midnight. KG 54 was committed to the invasion of Belgium, in support of the German 6th Army. The immediate goal was to suppress enemy air power. I./KG 54 bombed the Aéronautique Militaire Belge (Belgian Air Force – AéMI) air base at Antwerp-Deurne. A second operation was carried out and elements of it bombed ships in the Scheldt Estuary. II./KG 54 attacked Marck airfield and Calais harbour, the first operation carried out by KG 54 in the Battle of France. III./KG 54 carried out strikes against airfields at Courtrai, Belgium and Saint-Omer-en-Chaussée, France. III./KG 54 was intercepted by Royal Air Force (RAF) 607 Squadron which claimed three He 111s destroyed and another damaged over Roeselare—German losses are unknown in this battle. In the afternoon III./KG 54 bombed rail targets in the Ghent–Antwerp–Brussels area. The bombers were intercepted near Lille by 3, 85 and 607 Squadrons. 8. Staffel was suffered heavily, losing six He 111s. Staffelkapitän Fritz Stadelmayr was lost; two of his crew were killed, one was captured by the Belgians and two by the British.

This effort was part of an effort to achieve air superiority on the first day. On 10 May 47 French, 15 Belgian and 10 Dutch airfields were attacked. Despite claiming between 579 and 829 aircraft destroyed, only 210 were in fact eliminated. Most of this number were destroyed in the Low Countries by Kesselring's command. Hugo Sperrle, commanding Luftflotte 3, claimed 240 to 490 which was grossly inaccurate.

III./KG 54 carried out interdiction operations along the Belgian and Dutch border on 11 May. II./KG 54 spent the 11–13 May attacking rail targets in the Ghent–Antwerp–Brussels area and bridges along the Franco and Belgian border. On 12 May it bombed the airfield at Het Zoute north of Brussels. I./KG 54 repeated operations along the Dutch and Belgian border on 11 May, rail targets in the Ghent, Brussels and Antwerp area on 12 May, and rail targets on the French and Belgian border on 13 May. The stab unit was also involved in bombing Belgian Army columns near Ghent and Bruges and ships near the coast on 10 May. It is known to have operated near Zandhoven on 11 May. III./KG 54 bombed Allied armour at Andenne and Hasselt on 13 May. The Stab./KG 54 suffered a rare loss when one of its number was shot down by 3 Squadron's Frank Reginald Carey. KG 54 were also instrumental in driving the French 7th Army from the Moerdijk bridgeheads.

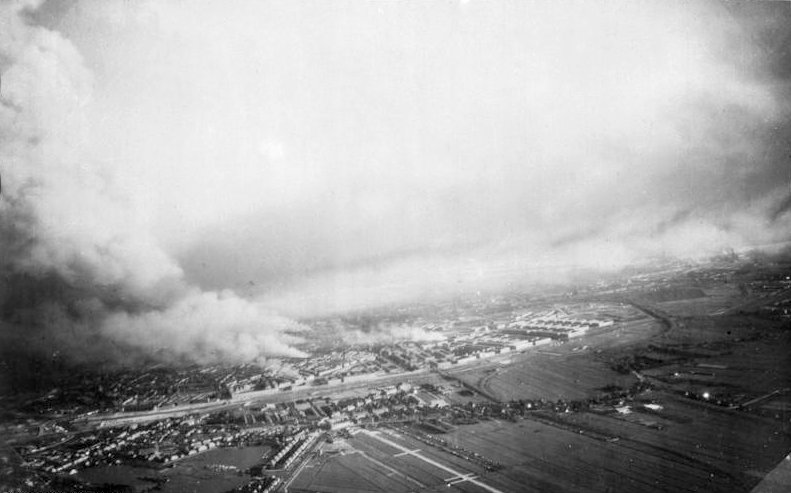
Rotterdam's burning city centre after the bombing.

On 14 May 1940, the Dutch Army, deprived or air cover, was still holding out. The Battle for The Hague had ended in a reverse for the Luftwaffe Fallschirmjäger, commanded by Kurt Student. The Battle of Rotterdam was also still ongoing. A furious Hitler ordered Dutch resistance to be broken immediately. Hermann Göring, who had factored the Netherlands into Fall Gelb because it offered airbases useful in a war against Great Britain, instructed Kesselring to bomb the city. Rudolf Schmidt's XXXIX Corps were prepared to storm Rotterdam the next morning.

Surrender negotiations had already begun and Student radioed General der Flieger Richard Putzier to cancel the attack. When the message reached KG 54's command post, the Geschwaderkommodore Walter Lackner, was already approaching Rotterdam and his aircraft had reeled in their long-range aerials. Haze and smoke obscured the target; to ensure that Dutch defences were hit Lackner brought his formation down to 2,300 ft (700 m). The first group unloaded their bombs on the centre of Altstadt where it was thought Dutch artillery was concentrated. The larger formation came from the north-east, out of position to spot red flares launched from the south side of the city, and proceeded with their attack. Two Gruppen, II. and III., with 54 He 111s dropped low to release 97 tonnes (213,848 lb) of bombs, mostly in the heart of the city.

Only Otto Höhne's I./KG 54 aborted the attack with his group. Höhne made wide detour to attack from the southwest. As the bombardier prepared to release the bombs, Höhne spotted a red flare near the Maas Island, and u-turned with his formation with their bombs still aboard. The city centre was destroyed. Bombs struck vegetable oil storage tanks causing uncontrollable fires. Some 800 Dutch civilians were killed and 78,000 made homeless. Another source gives a figure of 814 deaths. In the immediate aftermath, Rotterdam surrendered. Faced with air-dropped leaflets threatening the destruction of Utrecht, the Dutch surrendered on 15 May.

I./KG 54 targeted rail junctions, bridges, troops in western Belgium and carried out these operations on 16 May near Brussels. II./KG 54 moved to Gütersloh on 17 May and began more interdiction of rail and road traffic west and south of Brussels. III./KG 54 concentrated on bridges in Belgium on 15 and 16 May. I./KG 54 extended its area of operations into France on 17 May when it bombed the train station at Valenciennes, and troop concentrations near Cambrai, attacking the city before transferring to Werl the same day. On 18 May I./KG 54 bombed Arras, Calais and Dunkirk, before battles began in those cities. III./KG 54 bombed Valenciennes station, Mauberge and Cambrai on 17 and 18 May. On the latter date, I. and II./KG 54 were escorted by I./ZG 26 which protected them from attacks by No. 111 Squadron RAF at a cost to themselves.

Beginning with 19 May, KG 54 sustained particularly high losses necessitating the entire wing's removal from the front line nine days later. KG 54 was ordered to support Paul Ludwig Ewald von Kleist and his 1st Panzer Army as it closed on the English Channel. The attacks were focused around Lens, Arras and Lille. By the end of the day, the wing was ordered to fly at dusk or night to avoid further losses prior to withdrawing to Cologne and Ostheim. Geschwaderkommodore Lackner was shot down and became a prisoner of war on the 19th and replaced by Oberstleutnant Otto Höhne. The bombers were escorted by II./ZG 26 and I./JG 27 but a large formation was intercepted by RAF 145 and 601 Squadrons over Cambrai. KG 54 lost 14 bombers on 19 May because it was heavily committed. 4. Staffel suffered the most, losing four bombers and 3. Staffel lost another three, its commanding officer Hans Widmann survived. The losses were a severe blow to KG 54. The German fighter units were able to claim 37 French and 24 British aircraft in their defence.

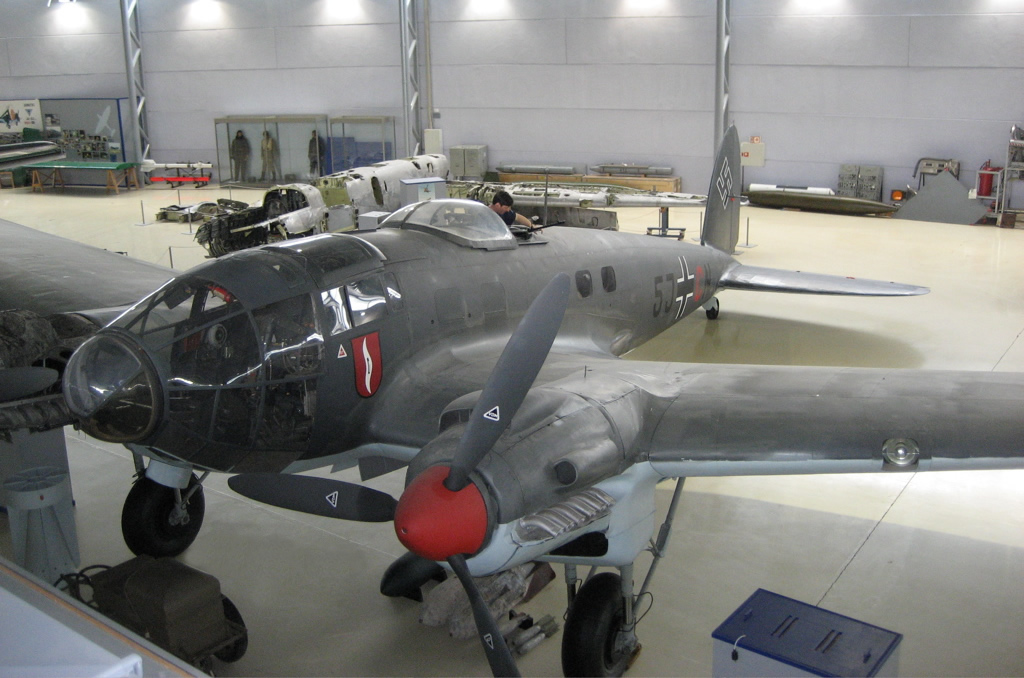
Heinkel He 111Ps equipped KG 54 in May 1940 - the displayed aircraft nears KG 4's wing insignia.

From 20 to 26 May, I. Gruppe bombed airfields at Norrent-Fontes and St. Omer and French Army positions at Abbeville and Tournai. KG 54 was also involved in the Battle of Dunkirk and Siege of Calais, with particularly heavy attacks on Dunkirk from 27 May–2 June. II. Gruppe bombed Calais on 21 May, but focused on the northern flank, bombing ports and airfields from Zeebrugge to Calais. It intensified attacks on Dunkirk from 24 May–2 June losing six aircraft in that time. On 3 June it was withdrawn to Celle to rest and refit while crews also converted to the Junkers Ju 88. KG 54 sank the 8,000-ton French Navy steamer Aden on 27 May. III./KG 54 also centred bombing operations over Dunkirk claiming a destroyer damaged on 1 June before transferring to Germany Adolf Häring was replaced as group commander Kurt Leonhardy.

III./KG 54 was the only one of the three Gruppen to take part in Fall Rot, the final phase of the Battle for France. On 3 June 1940 it participated in Operation Paula, around Paris and supported the advance to the French capital which was captured on 14 June after being declared an open city. It then proceeded to support the advance into Normandy and Brittany from 5–19 June. It attacked troop and communication targets as well as airfields at Abbeville, St Omer and Norrent-Fontes from the 5–15 June in the Orléans area on 16 June. By this time III./KG 54 was operating at the limits of its range, from bases in Germany, and were forced to stage to forward airfields in France to operate. By the time of the Armistice of 22 June 1940, III./KG 54 had lost nine aircraft, 12 men killed in action and one wounded in action.

KG 54 lost 46 bombers. Human losses amounted to 130 personnel killed, 10 missing, 60 wounded and 188 as POW (some were later released). It dropped 409 tons of bombs in 1,200 sorties. 118 captured crew members were released.

=== Battle of Britain and The Blitz ===
After the Armistice of 22 June 1940, the Luftwaffe settled into airfields along the French, Belgian and Dutch coasts. The British refusal to surrender or come to terms with Germany, precipitated Adolf Hitler's order for Operation Sealion, an amphibious invasion of Britain which was to take place after Luftwaffe had secured air superiority over the English Channel. The German Air Staff, Oberkommando der Luftwaffe (OKL), was ordered by Hermann Göring, to begin attacks on targets in southern England after the publication of his 30 June directive.

I. and II./KG 54 relocated to Coulommiers – Voisins Aerodrome for the offensive over Britain. On 19 July III./KG 54 was disbanded with some crews going to night fighters. The group was reactivated on 1 September 1942.

On 11 July IV.(Erg)/KG 54 was created at Lechfeld using some personnel from III./KG 54. Equipped with Ju 88As and He 111Ps the Staffel was renamed 10.(Erg)/54 to assist with the training of personnel. The previous day, the Luftwaffe had begun operations that were known to them as the Kanalkampf and escalated into the Battle of Britain. KG 54 suffered its first combat losses, when it lost two Ju 88s, one destroyed and one damaged, to 609 Squadron near a convoy off Swanage. KG 54 attacked convoys Booty and Agent. Gruppenkommandeur of II./KG 54, Major Leonhardy was shot down and killed by 601 Squadron along with two others. Two I./KG 54 Ju 88s were shot down by 87 Squadron. Another of the group's Ju 88s was damaged by a night fighter. Leonhardy was replaced by Karl-Bernhard Schlaeger.

On 13 August 1940, the Luftwaffe began an all-out attack on RAF Fighter Command. KG 54 attacked the Fleet Air Arm base at Gosport RAF Croydon RAF Farnborough and RAF Odiham. At 05:00, 20 Junkers Ju 88s of I./KG 54 took off to bomb the Royal Aircraft Establishment's airfield at 'RAF Farnborough' (RAE Farnborough). At 05:05, 18 Ju 88s from II./KG 54 took off for RAF Odiham. At 05:50, 88 Junkers Ju 87s of StG 77 began heading for Portland Harbour. The raids were escorted by about 60 Bf 110s of ZG 2, and V./LG 1 and 173 Bf 109s from JG 27, JG 53 and JG 3, which all flew ahead of the bomber stream to clear the airspace of enemy fighters. StG 77's target was obscured by cloud, but KG 54 continued to their target. RAF fighters from RAF Northolt, RAF Tangmere and RAF Middle Wallop intercepted. Four Ju 88s and one Bf 109 from JG 2 was shot down. The German fighters claimed six RAF fighters and the bombers another 14. In reality, the bombers only damaged five. The Bf 109s destroyed only one and damaged another. Of the five RAF fighters damaged by the bombers, two were write-offs. Of the 20 claimed, just three fighters were lost and three pilots were wounded. None were killed.

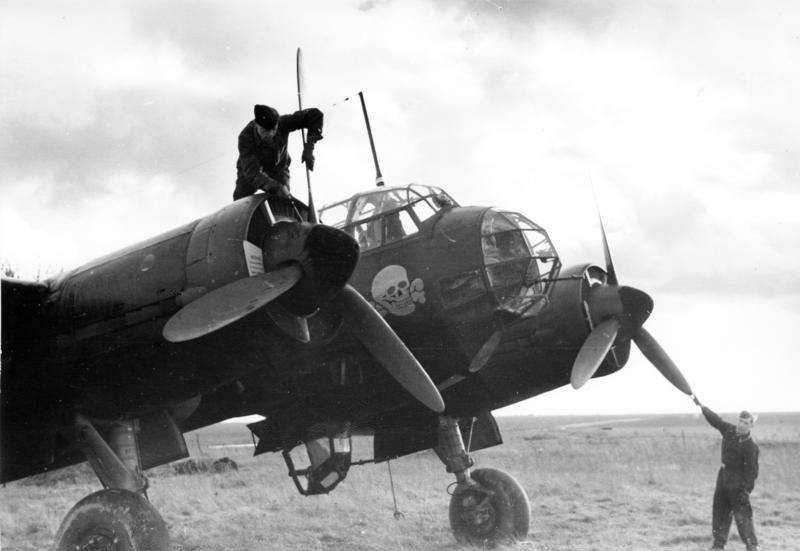
Junkers Ju 88 of Kampfgeschwader 54 (KG 54) in France, November 1940

Further missions by II./KG 54 to RAF Croydon were cancelled. I./KG 54 struck at the Fleet Air Arm (FAA) base at Gosport. ZG 2 was supposed to provide escort during one these attacks, and in a breakdown of communications, arrived over the target without their Ju 88s, which had been ordered to stand down. One Bf 110 was shot down by No. 238 Squadron RAF. 40 Ju 88s of KG 54 attempted a feint against Portland to facilitate StG 77's attack. No. 152, 213 and 601 Squadron intercepted and disrupted the bomb run. Three defending Bf 110s were shot down. KG 54 lost four Ju 88s destroyed and nine damaged on 13 August. Two crashed in England. On the 18 August 1940 I. and II./KG 54 attacked Gosport with 25 Ju 88s, apparently without loss.

Three days later I./KG 54 bombed the Abingdon aerodrome, II. Gruppe attacked shipping off the Isle of Wight and Southampton. First group lost one Ju 88 and II./KG 54 lost two in combat with 17 and 234 Squadron. II./KG 54 bombed Portland, Weymouth and RAF Warmwell on 25 August. Both groups attacked an aluminum factory at Banbury while II./KG 54 bombed airfields at Exeter and a troop training camp at Farnham.

On 5/6 September 1940 I./KG 54 made single-aircraft attacks on Southampton, Brighton and Shoreham. II./KG 54 also bombed Southampton. On 6 September the battle over Fighter Commands airfields receded, and attrition had taken a toll of KG 54. First group had only 18 operational bombers from 30. II. Gruppe had only 14 operational Ju 88s from 24. KG 54 then commenced the night Blitz against British cities. Both groups took part in the London Blitz on the night 7/8, 8/9 and 11/12 September. KG 54 did not take part in the 15 September battle. On the night of 15/16 September it bombed the factory at Banbury again. From 17 to 30 September KG 54 too part in nightly attacks on London. KG 54 was consistently bombed the British capital until May 1941, including the 20 April attack on Adolf Hitler's birthday in which 712 aircraft, the largest deployment of the month, began an enormous bombardment. It surpassed the 685 aircraft used on the 16/17 April attack, in which KG 54 was also present. It attacked the Rolls-Royce plant at Crewe on 7 October but mainly supported the attacks on major industrial cities: the Plymouth Blitz, Southampton Blitz, Cardiff Blitz, Manchester Blitz, Liverpool Blitz, Coventry Blitz, Birmingham Blitz, Sheffield Blitz, Portsmouth Blitz, Glasgow Blitz, Manchester Blitz, Bristol Blitz, Hull Blitz and Belfast Blitz. On 29/30 May 1941, KG 54 flew a last nuisance raid against Portland, which ended the wing's participation in operations over Britain for nearly two years.

KG 54 also struck at towns alongside major industrial centres: Daventry, Rugby, White Waltham (possibly to attack White Waltham Airfield), Newton Abbot, Cropredy, Peterborough, Aylesbury, Selsey Bill, Leicester, Northampton, Oxford, Bournemouth, Brighton, Eastbourne, Aldershot, Birkenhead, Avonmouth, Greenock, Minehead, Newcastle upon Tyne, Yeovil, Warrington, Honington, Andover, Blackpool, Reading, Nottingham, Warmwell, Dartmouth, Holyhead, Shoreham, Dover, Torquay, Exmouth, Mullion, Falmouth, Andover, Bicester, Harwell, Boscombe Down and Swansea.

The unit lost 265 killed, 121 missing, 63 as POWs and 65 wounded as well as 62 aircraft during operations over Britain. A further 62 were damaged. I./KG 54 flew 1,189 missions, and lost 27 aircraft and another 27 damaged in July 1940 – May 1941. III./KG 54 lost 9 aircraft, 12 personnel killed, and one wounded (POW figures unknown).

=== Western Front, Channel and Atlantic Front ===
During its time in France, II./KG 54 also attempted to support the German battleship Bismarck during her Atlantic operation. II./KG 54 moved to Lannion for 26–28 May 1941. However, the unit was unable to intervene before she sank.

=== Eastern Front ===
The KG 54 committed 70 aircraft to the initial attack, with 64 serviceable to Operation Barbarossa. The groups were based at Lublin–Świdnik under the command of Fliegerkorps V, subordinated to Luftflotte 4. KG 54 was to support Army Group South.

On 22 June 1941 it attacked airfields at Łuck, Kolki, Wilick, Janówka, Nielisk, Koshirski and other east of Kowel. The following day it attacked airfields at Ovruch, Korosten and Luginy, and again on 24 June. KG 54's losses are unknown but the corps lost seven bombers on the 23 June. From 22 to 25 June, it claimed 774 Soviet aircraft destroyed on the ground in 1,600 sorties after bombing 77 Soviet air bases. KG 54 attacked Soviet tank concentrations at Lubysza and Rawa Ruzka on 23 June, but returned to bombing airfields at Kiev and Borispol while bombing the rail station at Rovno on 25 June. Ovruch, Lugniy and Korosten airfields were revisited on 26 June. On the same day, elements of I./KG 54 attacked the Saroy to Korosten and Krasne to Svarkova rail lines. The air corps bombers lost eight Ju 88 and He 111s with nine damaged, the highest losses over the front line. The air support was effective, and an attack by KG 55, KG 51 and KG 54 injured Ignat Karpezo, the commander of the 15th Soviet Mechanised Corps. The three German bomber units claimed the destruction of 201 Soviet tanks from 22 to 30 June from the Mechanised formation which attempted to block the 1st Panzer Army. They played a vital role in the Battle of Brody. On 1 July KG 54, 55 and 51 routed a Soviet counteroffensive and destroyed 220 motor vehicles and 40 tanks near Lviv.

On 28 June it repeatedly bombed columns neat Lviv and Tarnopol on 30 June. More attacks on airfields and Soviet rail heads in the Shepetovka, Plosk, Novograd, Volynski and Proskurov areas. On 4 July it carried out numerous air strikes against rail and road columns in the Ovruch, Korosten and Stephano areas. On 5 July, it bombed these targets in Zhitomir, Melitopol and Berdichev and again the next day. KG 54 was intercepted by Soviet fighters on the latter date and lost three of its 36 Ju 88s to the VVS South-Western Front units. KG 54 attacked the Stalin Line near Novograd Volynski. Throughout July KG 54 supported the advance toward Kiev. Rail targets at Zhitomir-Kiev, Kazatin-Fastov, Fastov-Kiev, Korosten-Novograd and Korsun between 8 and 13 July, as well as tank concentrations at Berdichev. I./KG 54 bombed rail bridges over the Dnieper River on 17 July near Kanev and Cherkassy. On 6 August 1941 the group handed the remaining 11 crews and 19 Ju 88s to II./KG 54 and departed to Ohlau to re-equip and receive new crews. It would not return until October 1941. On 23 July, KG 54 reported two losses, one to a taran, or ramming attack, by Ivan Novikov from 88 IAP, flying a Polikarpov I-16.

By the time of withdrawal, I./KG 54 had been credited with 240 aircraft destroyed on the ground, hundreds of artillery and tanks destroyed and thousands of motor vehicles destroyed. Commanding officer Richard Linke was credited with 30 tanks destroyed and was awarded the Knight's Cross of the Iron Cross on 19 September 1941. The cost to the group was 23 aircraft.

II./KG 54 lost 12 aircraft during July, during the same period I./KG 54 lost 19. From 24 to 31 July the targets were mostly airfields. It bombed Dnepropetrovsk in August and supported the encirclement in the Battle of Uman. From 16 to 21 August it focused mainly on troop concentrations around Dnepropetrovsk. From 26 to 30 August it attacked bridges over the Desna River, northeast of Kiev. II./KG 54 was the only active group of KG 54 and recorded only three losses in August. It focused mainly on air interdiction in the Poltava, Krementschug and Lubny areas. It supported Axis forces in the Battle of Kiev and supported the 11th Army at Perekop. KG 54, and Fliegerkorps V played a critical role in defeating an offensive by the Soviet 26th Army near Boguslav. The air command claimed 148 vehicles and 48 tanks on 7 to 9 August, thus preventing a rout at Uman. During the encirclement at Uman, the air corps, of which KG 54 was a part, claimed 420 vehicles, 58 tanks, and 22 artillery batteries. Over Kiev, Fliegerkorps V claimed 42 aircraft on the ground, 23 tanks and 2,171 vehicles destroyed from the 12–21 September. II./KG 54's losses amounted to only four with another four damaged in September—it had lost only three in August.

In October KG 54 was strengthened by the return of I. Gruppe on 18 October. KG 54 focused on rail and road traffic during the month, particularly bottlenecks at Kharkov, Sumy, Belgorod, Kupyansk, Millerovo, Kolomak, Izyum, Kirilovka, Dnepropetrovsk, Debaltsevo, Sask and Rostov. I./KG 54 was removed from the front after the 12 November and sent to Germany, at Memmingen. During the group's time in the East it flew 1,408 sorties, dropped 1,718 tons of bombs, lost 15 bombers destroyed, 14 damaged, 21 killed, 17 missing, nine wounded and two captured.

II./KG 54 continued on to the end of Barbarossa. It indirectly supported German forces in the First Battle of Kharkov. It bombed Soviet shipping in the Sea of Azov, and attacked installations at Kerch and Aktarsk (28–31 October). In October it lost just two bombers. In November airfields and rail heads were the targets in the Donbas. On 10 November it was withdrawn, but unlike I./KG 54, it returned in the new year. The group lost 24 bombers and 20 damaged in Barbarossa. It lost 39 crew members killed, 37 missing, 2 as POWs and 28 wounded until the 18 November. It stayed in East Prussia resting and replenishing until 21 January 1942. From 22 June to 15 November KG 54 lost 122 killed, 108 missing, eight captured, 88 wounded, 39 aircraft destroyed and 35 damaged in over 4,000 sorties.

II./KG 54, the only unit of the Geschwader to operate on the front after Barbarossa. From Königsberg, the group transferred to Orsha, to support Fliegerkorps VIII in Army Group Centre's sector. On 24 January it attacked the Soviet 39th Army at Mologino in the Battles of Rzhev until late March 1942, interdicting rail traffic in the Kalinin and Toropets sectors. On 5/6 April 1942, it bombed the aircraft engine plant at Rybinsk, north-northeast of Moscow. Operations for May are largely unknown; it took part in security warfare operations near Dorogobuzh on 3 June and armed reconnaissance over Tula on 10/11 June.

On 18 June 1942 II./KG 54 was reassigned to Fliegerkorps VIII and was based near Kharkov-Volchenko from the 22nd. The group reverted to the traditional interdiction of rail lines in the Borovskoy, and rail targets along the Valuyki-Volokonovka axis. From the 24 to 27 June it flew two missions per day over Belya, Grakorka, Yelets, Terasovka, Raspassiyevke. From 28 June 1942 it supported Operation Blue, the massive German summer offensive to the Caucasus. From 1 to 3 July, rail attacks against Voronezh, Novyy, Oskol and Kosienke were flown. Airfields at Chebyaki and Korotoyak were also bombed by the group over the 4 and 5 July. From 6 to 7 July, the unit attacked the bridges over the Don River in the Rossosh and Millerovo area. II./KG 54 was ordered to France on 8 July, but returned to the central sector of the Eastern Front in mid-August.

On 17 August, from Shatalovka, it flew support operations for the 3rd Panzer Army near Rzhev and Vyazma to 30 August. Over the 1–8 October it targets the large Red Army rail head at Soblago. The group flew its 5,000th mission in the Soviet Union on 6 October. The Gruppe was withdrawn from Russia on 13 October 1942; the last recorded sortie was flown on the 9th. It was moved to Munich via Warsaw. From 18 August to 13 October it reported the loss of 10 aircraft. During 1942 operations in the East, it lost 32 aircraft destroyed and 20 damaged, suffered 31 killed, 57 missing and 29 captured. No personnel were recorded as missing.

=== Western Front, Baedeker raids ===
II./KG 54 briefly returned to British skies in 1942 for the Baedeker Raids. Between 29 July and 14 August 1942 it lost 6 bombers on missions against Bedford (targeting a car plant), Birmingham, Norwich, Southend, Hastings and Luton. It returned to the Eastern Front on 17 August 1942.

=== Mediterranean, Middle East and African theatres ===
I./KG 54 supported the Afrika Korps from December 1941 – February 1943. It was based at Catania, Sicily from 19 December 1941 and attacked airfields on Malta on 20 December 1941 as the siege intensified. It moved to Gerbini and attacked Malta Convoys until late February 1942 while based at Benghazi, Libya. It bombed Hal Far airfield with 8 aircraft on 14 February and took part in heavy air attacks on 20 March. It damaged a destroyer on 23 March, bombed Valletta harbour with 12 Ju 88s on 26 March. 19 Ju 88s struck at Gudia and RAF Luqa on 1 April while another 10 attacked Hal Far on 1 April. Valletta was the main target on 4 to 7 April, and airfields from the 8th to 13th. I./KG 54 carried out convoy escort from 19 April to 18 May 1942, as well as raids against Malta. It moved to Eleusis, Greece from 19 May after recording 754 sorties in April 1942.

A contingent of 14 aircraft supported the German Africa Corps in the Battle of Gazala from 25 to 31 May before reverting to attacks on Malta and convoy escort from 24 May to 22 June. The group supported the Axis forces in the Battle of Bir Hakeim on 1 June, before supporting operations against Tobruk and El Adem from 1 to 5 June. IV.(Erg)/KG 54 engaged in attacking Operation Harpoon and Operation Vigorous, helping sink three ships for 20,978 gross register tons (GRT). From 12 June, and for two days, the Harpoon convoy was harried by I./KG 54 and I./LG 1, and they sank the 8,619 GRT freighter Bhutan and damaged the Potaro.

It allocated seven Ju 88s to Derna to support the Axis in North Africa on 19 June. From July to 10 August, attacks against Malta and convoy escort were the main activities. I./KG 54 attack the Pedestal Convoy without loss from the 11 to 14 August. By 20 September it could muster only 14 combat ready aircraft from 32. Still the only group of KG 54 present in the theatre, it supported the last offensive against Malta from 10 to 19 October, and on 24 October flew bombing operations in the Second Battle of El Alamein.

II. and III./KG 54, the latter being resurrected on 1 September 1942, joined I./KG 54 in operations over Africa and the Mediterranean. From October 1942 to February 1943 KG 54 was heavily involved in convoy escort, anti-submarine warfare, and relentless attacks on Allied-held ports in Algeria, Libya and Tunisia as it attempted to overcome the effects of Operation Flax and Operation Retribution. I./KG 54 left Sicily for Piacenza from 22 December 1942 to 15 February 1943. It returned to Catania on 17 February and carried out 169 escort sorties for convoys in March 1943 as well as anti-shipping and attacks against harbours. On 5 March I./KG 54 and I./KG 77 attacked the convoys MW.22 and XT.4, sinking the steamer Yorba Linda (6,900 GRT). On 19 March I./KG 54 and KG 77 sank the liberty ship Ocean Voyager (7,174 GRT), Greek steamer Vavara (1,654 GRT) and heavily damaged the destroyer Derwent. It did offer bombing support for Axis forces from 22 to 27 March 1943 at the Battle of the Mareth Line. By early June the group was decimated after constant action. I./KG 54 was moved to Ingolstadt to rebuild from 6 June to 7 October 1943. II./KG 54 were engaged in similar operations and lost 30 aircraft from 27 October 1942 to the end of May 1943. On 26 May (until 8 October 1943) it was moved to Vienna.

KG 54 losses in over North African and the Mediterranean from November 1942 to May 1943 amounted to 43 destroyed and one damaged. I./KG 54 reported the loss of 13 and one damaged; II./KG 54 lost 14, III./KG 54 lost 15 and IV./KG 54 reported one loss. The last of the losses over African occurred on the 3 May 1943 when III./KG 54 lost two Ju 88s.

III./KG 54 remained active for longer. It had only 8 operational Ju 88s from 21 on 10 April. The group attacked the landings resulting from Operation Corkscrew, on Pantelleria, on 11 June. It was the only group involved in fighting the invasion of Sicily (Operation Husky). It bombed the Allied landing forces by day and night before withdrawing to Foggia, Italy. On 6 September it contested the Allied invasion of Italy, bombing the landing forces at Salerno and attacking Allied landing forces in the Gulf of Naples, on 30 September, its last mission in Italy. From 30 September to 26 October 1943, it was inactive at Bergamo, where it rested and rebuilt until 31 March 1944.

II./KG 54 continued operating throughout the Italian Campaign, making all out efforts against Allied shipping, with LT 350 torpedoes in the Gulf of Naples over 1–10 November. On 21, 23 October, through to the 6/7 November 1943, the group made heavy air attacks on Naples. The Gruppe lost 18 Ju 88s during these operations. II./KG 54 helped carry out the Air Raid on Bari.

=== The Western Front and Operation Steinbock ===
Operating from bases in northern Germany (Wittmund, Jever, Marx), Stab., I., and II./KG 54 took part in Operation Steinbock. It began the offensive on 21/22 January 1944, and all Gruppen were involved in the first wave. That first night KG 54 lost four aircraft. On 3 and 4 February 1944 KG 54 were involved in another attack on London. One of the 15 bombers lost that night belonged to KG 54. 2./KG 54, code B3+EK piloted by Unteroffizier Helmut Friedrich Weihs was discovered with its crew in the Zuiderzee in the 1970s when the Dutch Air Force drained the area. On 18/19 February KG 54 lost two bombers over their air bases from RAF night fighter intruders. On 20/21 February it lost another four. On 2/3 March and 14/15 March KG 54 lost a bomber on each night. On 19/20 March KG 54 turned to Hull, for the first time since 1941. It lost one bomber on the raid. On 18/19 April KG 54 lost another four Ju 88s. On 23/24 April 1944 KG 54 lost another five.

I. Gruppe lost 15 Ju 88s over the course of February and March. By 20 March it had only nine operational from 17. From 1 to 12 May it was ordered to Évreux and Saint-André-de-l'Eure Airport to rest and refit. II./KG 54 had 14 from 19 operational on 20 March. On 25 April it was dissolved at Flensburg to form II./KG 66 which did not take place. I. and III./KG 54 mined the sea lanes off Portland, Portsmouth. Torquay, Weymouth and Falmouth in April and May 1944.

The Gruppen were rushed to Juvincourt Airfield on 6 June 1944, due to the Normandy landings. I./KG 54 operated against the British beachheads with Butterfly Bombs and mined the Orne and Vire estuaries on 7/8 June 1944. It mined the Seine bay on 8/9 June. I./KG 54 used fragmentation bombs against Arromanches and Lion-sur-Mer on 9/10 June. It bombed Sainte-Mère-Église on 10/11 June and had lost 13 machines by the 11 June. It flew some air drop missions on 12 June, but until 18 flew attacks against invasion shipping using PC 1000s, BM 1000s, and LT 350s. Subordinated to IX Fliegerkorps, it had only nine combat ready aircraft from 16 on 15 June. On 26 June it was moved to Orléans-Bricy to avoid Allied tactical aviation. It was moved to Eindhoven on 10 July and flew mainly mining operations from 25 July to 14 August 1944. It reported 13 bombers in July. It flew some long-range operations to support the German Army in the Battle of Saint-Lô on 27/28, and 29/30 July. From 4–10 August it flew support operations in the Avranches area to assist the 5th Panzer Army. From 11 to 19 August, the Gruppe flew attacks against Allied forces breaking out of Normandy (beginning with Operation Cobra) and more mining operations. It suffered 11 losses in August. I./KG 54 was withdrawn to Giebelstadt on 22 August and began conversion into a fighter group, to use the Messerschmitt Me 262A. It was redesignated I./KG (J) 54 on 1 October 1944.

III./KG 54 carried out similar operations against the landings with withdrew to Eindhoven with I. Gruppe. From 16 to 20 July if flew night attacks over Saint-Lo and in support of the German forces in the Battle of Caen. Over the 21 to 31 July it lost five aircraft in night operations. In August it flew mining operations over Le Havre and supported the 5th Panzer Army. On 15 August Allied air forces dropped 566 tons on the German base at Soesterberg but it did not effect the group. Another five bombers lost over Normandy in August brought bomber operations to a close. The group transferred to Neuburg by rail and was formally renamed III./KG (J) 54 on 1 October 1944.

=== Jet operations ===
KG(J) 54 was close to full-strength in February 1945—III/KG(J) 54 never became operational. The Stabsschwarm and I. Gruppe flew an intercept mission on 9 February 1945 with III/JG 7. Some 67 Messerschmitt Me 262s were sent to engage 1,296 US heavy bombers attacking viaducts, road and communication targets in Central Germany. The more experienced JG 7 pilots aggressively engaged the escorts, but the former bomber pilots of KG(J) 54 could only claim four bombers (at least one confirmed) from the US 447th Bombardment Group before losing five Me 262s to the 357th Fighter Group. Geschwaderkommodore Volprecht Riedesel Freiherr Zu Eisenbach was killed in a collision with a US fighter while the Stabsschwarm was destroyed. Major Hansgeorg Bätcher, replaced him. Göring refused to accept the explanation that KG(J) 54s failure had been because the bomber pilots could not cope with the speed of the aircraft or react like fighter pilots. He proposed, that since the jets were to begin firing from 1,000 metres instead of 600; the flaws in his thinking were evident in the fact the fighters were lost to US escorts, not the bombers, and the muzzle velocity of the MK 108 cannon was too low to fire from that range, which necessitated the pilot to pitch up the nose at a steep angle to lob a few shells onto the target. On 16 February III. Gruppe lost 16 Me 262s on the ground as the US Eighth Air Force struck at airfields in the Munich area and the Regensburg factory. KG(J) 55 was hit harder, losing 23, and never became operational.

== War crime allegations ==
KG 54's attack on Rotterdam was subject to examination and debate at the Nuremberg Trials. Göring and Kesselring both refused to take any responsibility for the attacks. Richard Overy contends the attack, like the bombing of Warsaw, occurred because the Dutch Army refused to abandon the city or declare it an open city. Overy suggests that the possibility that the bombing took place because Göring was attracted to the idea of displaying the ruthlessness of German military power to the World, but acknowledges that cannot, and has not, been proven. Göring was cross-examined on the issue on the third and last day of his testimony, in which he defended himself on a host of war crimes and crimes against humanity charges. He refused to accept culpability and argued he ordered the bombing because heavy fighting was occurring there. He also argued that the dynamics of modern warfare eclipsed the policies established at the Geneva and Hague conventions.

At Nuremberg Prosecutor Maxwell Fyfe accused Kesselring of ordering the bombing as surrender negotiations were being carried out. Kesselring had admitted in a previous interrogation that the real purpose in bombing Rotterdam was to "present a firm attitude and secure an immediate peace" - in other words a war-winning attack. Kesselring denied using those words but admitted to having used the words "severe measures" to overcome Dutch resistance. When presented with evidence the negotiations had begun at 10:30 and the attack order had been given at 13:00, Kesselring replied that he was merely complying with Kurt Student's request and was unaware the Dutch intended to surrender. The German official historians Horst Boog Gerhart Krebs and Detlef Vogel argued the city was a combat zone and the bombing did not violate the then valid Hague Convention on Land Warfare, 1907.

Otto Hohne, who was in command of I./KG 54 during the attack was also called on to testify and contended that because of the heavy smoke and haze which hung over the city, it had been something of a miracle that he saw the red signal flare and was able to abort the last phase of the bombing. All flying officers involved in the actual attack noted the dense smoke and haze which hung over the city before the bombing commenced. For his actions that day, Hohne earned the curious distinction of receiving the Knight's Cross of the Iron Cross for calling off his last wave of bombers.

== Commanding officers ==
- Oberst Walter Lackner, 1 May 1939 – 19 May 1940 (POW)
- Oberstleutnant Otto Höhne, 22 June 1940 – 23 November 1941
- Oberstleutnant Walter Marienfeld, 23 November 1941 – 1 April 1943
- Oberstleutnant Volprecht Riedesel Freiherr zu Eisenbach, 1 April 1943 – 27 February 1945
- Major Hansgeorg Bätcher, 27 February 1945 – 8 May 1945

== Bibliography ==
- Air Power History, Volumes 44–45, 1997.
- Bekker, Cajus (1994). The Luftwaffe War Diaries: The German Air Force in World War II. New York: Da Capo Press. ISBN 978-0-306-80604-9.
- Bergström, Christer [in Swedish] (2007a). Barbarossa - The Air Battle: July–December 1941. London: Chevron/Ian Allan. ISBN 978-1-85780-270-2.
- Bertke, Donald A.; Kindell, Don; Smith, Gordon (2012). The Royal Navy is Bloodied in the Mediterranean. World War II Sea War. Vol. 3. Dayton, Ohio: Bertke Publications. ISBN 978-1-937470-01-2.
- Boog, Horst; Krebs, Gerhard; Vogel, Detlef (2006). Germany and the Second World War: The Strategic Air War in Europe and the War in the West and East Asia, 1943–1944. Vol. VII. Clarendon Press. ISBN 978-0-19-822889-9.
- Buckley, John (1999). Air Power in the Age of Total War. UCL Press. ISBN 978-1-85728-589-5.
- Bungay, Stephen (2000). The Most Dangerous Enemy : A History of the Battle of Britain. London: Aurum Press. ISBN 978-1-85410-721-3.
- Caldwell, Donald; Muller, Richard (2007). The Luftwaffe Over Germany: Defense of the Reich. MBI Publishing. ISBN 978-1-85367-712-0.
- Cull, Brian; Lander, Bruce; Weiss, Heinrich (1999). Twelve Days in May. London: Grub Street Publishing. ISBN 978-1-90230-412-0.
- de Zeng, H.L.; Stankey, D.G.; Creek, E.J. (2007). Bomber Units of the Luftwaffe 1933–1945; A Reference Source, Volume 1. Ian Allan Publishing. ISBN 978-1-85780-279-5.
- Dupuy, Trevor (1963). The Military History of World War II.: The air war in the West, September 1939-May 1941. Franklin Watts. ISBN 978-0-531-01238-3.
- Goldensohn, Leon (2005). The Nuremberg interviews : an American psychiatrist's conversations with the defendants and witnesses. Robert Gellately. New York: Vintage Books. ISBN 978-0-307-42910-0. OCLC 712782345.
- Goss, Chris (2007). Sea Eagles Volume Two: Luftwaffe Anti-Shipping Units 1942–45. Burgess Hill: Classic Publications. ISBN 978-1-9032-2356-7.
- Goss, Chris (2010). The Luftwaffe's Blitz: The Inside Story, November 1940 – May 1941. Manchester: Crecy Publishing. ISBN 978-0-85979-148-9.
- Frieser, Karl-Heinz (1995). Blitzkrieg-Legende: Der Westfeldzug 1940, Operationen des Zweiten Weltkrieges [The Blitzkrieg Myth: The Western Campaign in 1940, Operations of the Second World War] (in German). Munich: R. Oldenbourg. ISBN 978-3-486-56124-1.
- Hohne, Joachim; Holden, Randall (2004). Glory Refused: Memoirs of a Teenage Rocket Pilot of the Third Reich. Self Published. OCLC 70698294.
- Hooton, E.R. (1994). Phoenix Triumphant; The Rise and Rise of the Luftwaffe. London: Arms & Armour Press. ISBN 978-1-85409-181-9.
- Hooton, E. R. (1997). Eagle in Flames: The Fall of the Luftwaffe. Brockhampton Press. ISBN 978-1-86019-995-0.
- Hooton, E.R. (2007b). Luftwaffe at War; Blitzkrieg in the West. Chevron/Ian Allan. ISBN 978-1-85780-272-6.
- Jackson, Robert (1974). Air War Over France, 1939–1940. London: Ian Allan. ISBN 978-0-7110-0510-5.
- James, T.C.G; Cox, Sebastian (2000). The Battle of Britain. London: Frank Cass. ISBN 978-0-7146-8149-8.
- Mackay, Ron (2011). The Last Blitz: Operation Steinbock, the Luftwaffe's Last Blitz on Britain – January to May 1944. Red Kite. ISBN 978-0-9554735-8-6.
- Mason, Francis (1969). Battle Over Britain. London: McWhirter Twins Ltd. ISBN 978-0-901928-00-9.
- Murray, Williamson (1983). Strategy for Defeat: The Luftwaffe 1933–45. Washington: Brassey's. ISBN 978-1-57488-125-7.
- Overy, Richard J. (2013). The Bombing War : Europe 1939–1945. London & New York: Allen Lane. ISBN 978-0-7139-9561-9.
- Parker, Nigel (2013). Luftwaffe Crash Archive: Volume 1: A Documentary History of Every Enemy Aircraft Brought Down Over the United Kingdom, September 1939 – 14 August 1940. London: Red Kite. ISBN 978-1-906592-09-7.
- Shores, Christopher F.; Ring, Hans; Hess, William N. (1975). Fighters Over Tunisia. London, UK: Neville Spearman. ISBN 978-0-85435-210-4.
- Radtke, Siegfried (1990). Kampfgeschwader 54 von der Ju 52 zur Me 262, Eine Chronik nach Kriegstagebüchern, Dokumenten und Berichten 1935–1945 [Kampfgeschwader 54 from Ju 52 to Me 262, A Chronicle based on War Diaries, Documents and Reports 1935–1945] (in German). Munich, Germany: Schild Verlag. ISBN 978-3-88014-098-1.
- Rice, Earle (1997). The Nuremberg Trials. San Diego: Lucent Books. ISBN 978-1-56006-269-1.
- Wakefield, Ken (1999). Pfadfinder: Luftwaffe Pathfinder Operations Over Britain. NPI Media Group. ISBN 978-0-75241-692-2.
