= Freedom Square, Racibórz =

Town square in Racibórz, Poland

Freedom Square
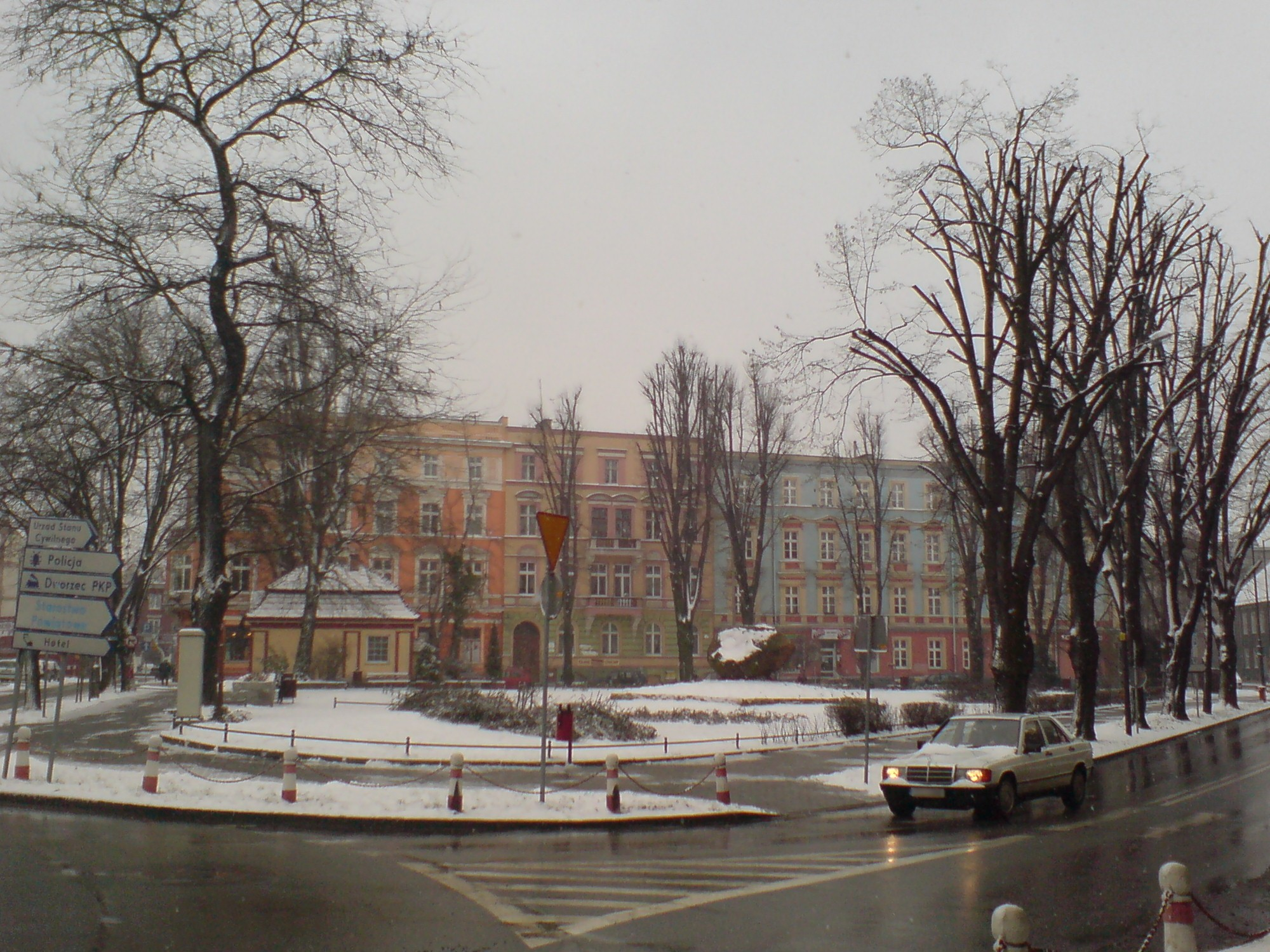
- Freedom Square in winter
- Interactive map of Freedom Square
- Part of: Bronki
- Location: Racibórz
- Coordinates: 50.0937°N 18.2150°E

Freedom Square in Racibórz (Polish: Plac Wolności; formerly German: Platz vor dem Großen Tor, later Holzmarkt, Zwingerplatz, Polko-Platz, Horst-Wessel-Platz) is a town square in the Bronki district of Racibórz, at the intersection of Wojska Polskiego, Karol Miarka, Londzin, Drewniana, Gimnazjalna, and Długa streets. A distinctive feature is the glacial erratic from Wojnowice, placed in the 1930s, dating to the ice age.

== History ==
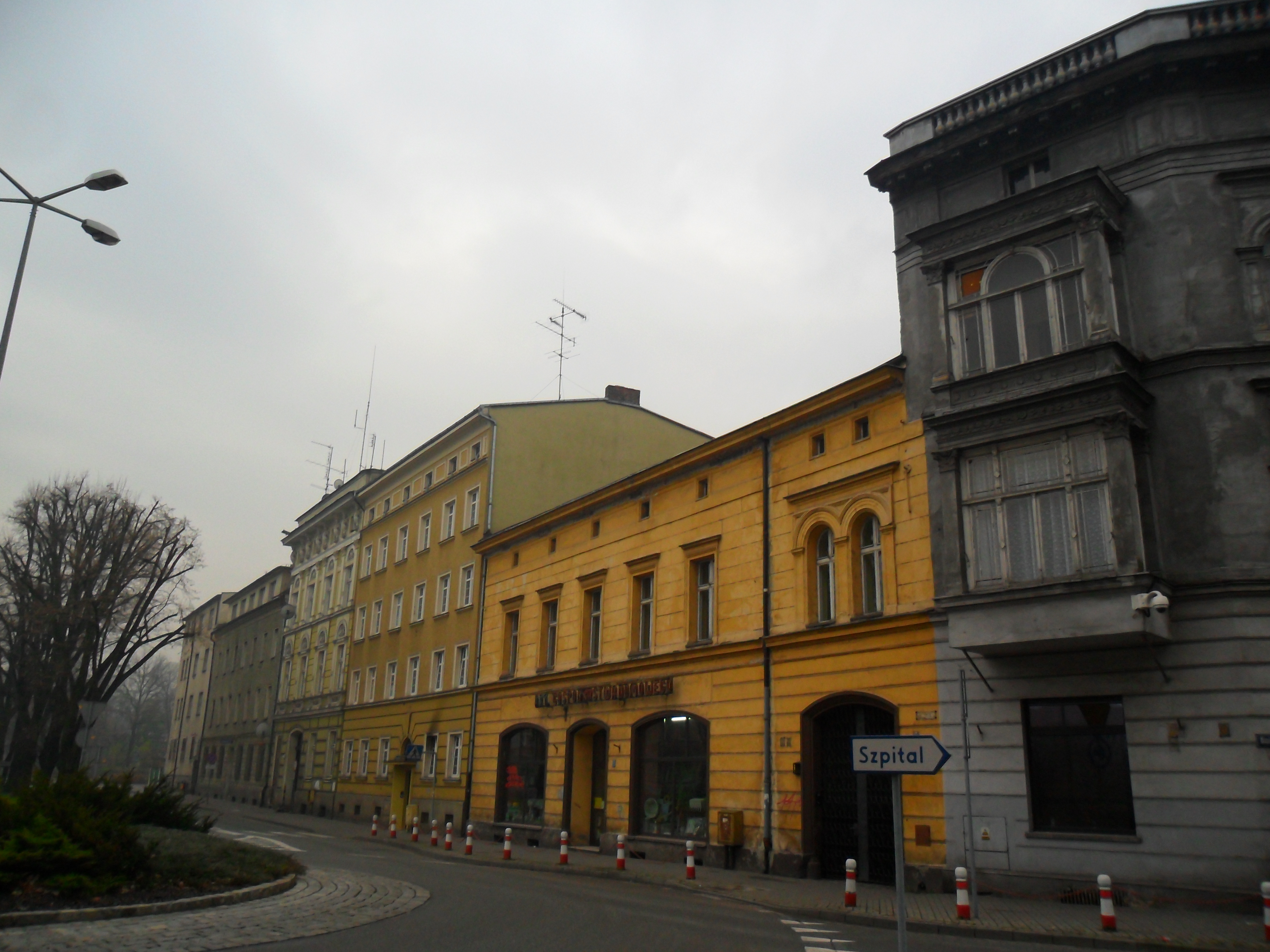
Buildings at Freedom Square

The square's site once hosted the Great Gate, one of three entrances to Racibórz's fortified town, encircled by defensive walls. It lies on the edge of Old Town, in central Racibórz, about 400 metres from the Market Square. The gate was demolished in 1818.

Initially, the square was a celebration ground for the local shooting guild returning from a nearby range. In 1817, an animal market relocated here from the town center, operating until 1880 when it moved to the former Franciscan garden in Bronki. Early names included Platz vor dem Großen Tor (Square Before the Great Gate), Holzmarkt (Timber Market), and Zwingerplatz (Moat Square). These were tied to the former name of Wojska Polskiego Street as Moat Street. In 1870, the tenement at 13 Freedom Square was acquired by Adolf Henryk Polko. Polko, a notable councilor and entrepreneur, ended the animal market. He funded the square's redesign, adding rare trees and Racibórz's first public fountain. The fountain's basin sat on a tall pedestal, collecting water.

In 1884, the City Council named it Polko-Platz after Polko. On 6 June 1934, the fountain was replaced by a glacial erratic from Wojnowice, hailed as a "millennial monument" of National Socialism, surrounded by a low wall with plaques naming Horst Wessel, Albert Leo Schlageter, and other Nazi figures. In the 1930s, it was renamed Horst-Wessel-Platz for Wessel, a German Nazi killed in an attack and author of Die Fahne Hoch. Nazi references were removed in 1945.

Between 2005 and 2006, the intersection with Drewniana and Londzina streets was converted into a roundabout.

== Description and traffic ==
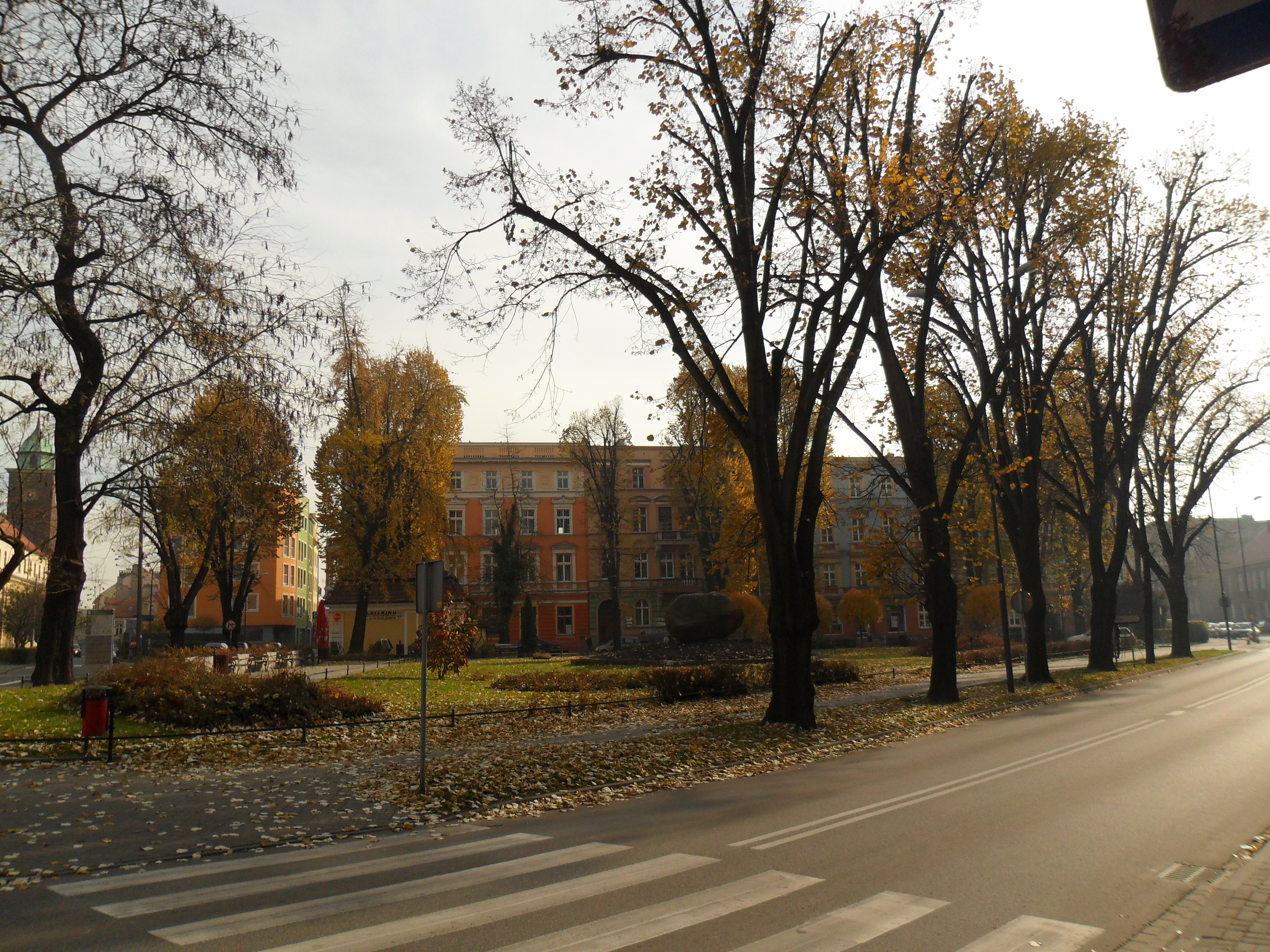
Freedom Square with flowerbeds, paths, benches, and glacial erratic

Roughly triangular, the square is encircled by roads. In the north, Londzina and Drewniana streets form a roundabout. Paved paths with benches crisscross the square, with a central glacial erratic, grass, flowerbeds, and plants like honey locust and ginkgo. A small brick building houses a café. The east features a neoclassical cooperative building and a standalone tenement, the west a row of buildings, and the south a line of eclectic tenements with Renaissance Revival elements.

Asphalt roads surround the square, with sidewalks on both sides. From the junction of Karol Miarka and Wojska Polskiego to Długa and Gimnazjalna streets, traffic is one-way; elsewhere, it's two-way. A roundabout operates at Londzina and Drewniana streets. Entry to Gimnazjalna Street from the square is prohibited. The square spans about 65 ares. It sits at 190.5 m above sea level.

== Architecture ==
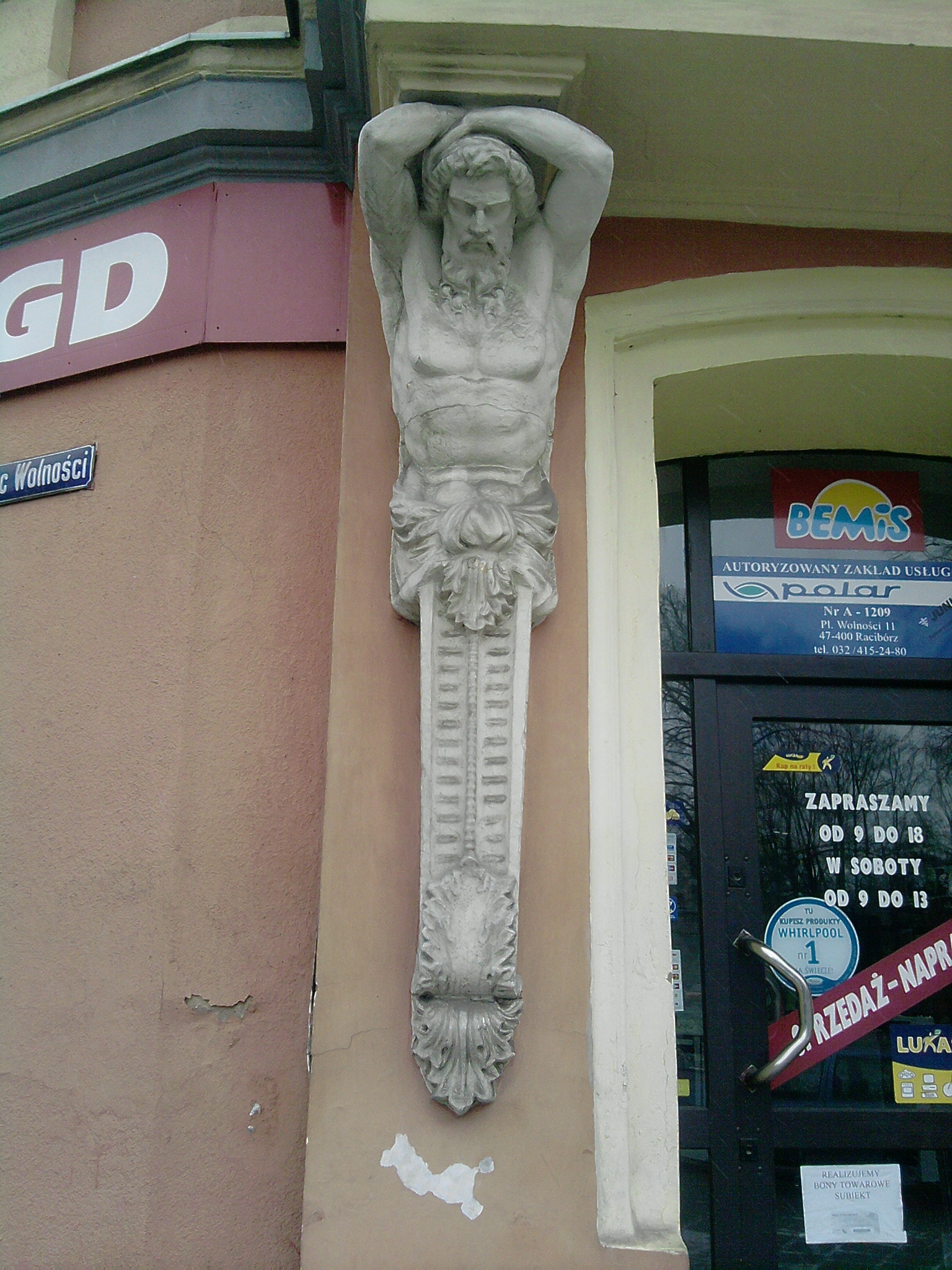
Herma supporting a bay window at 11 Freedom Square

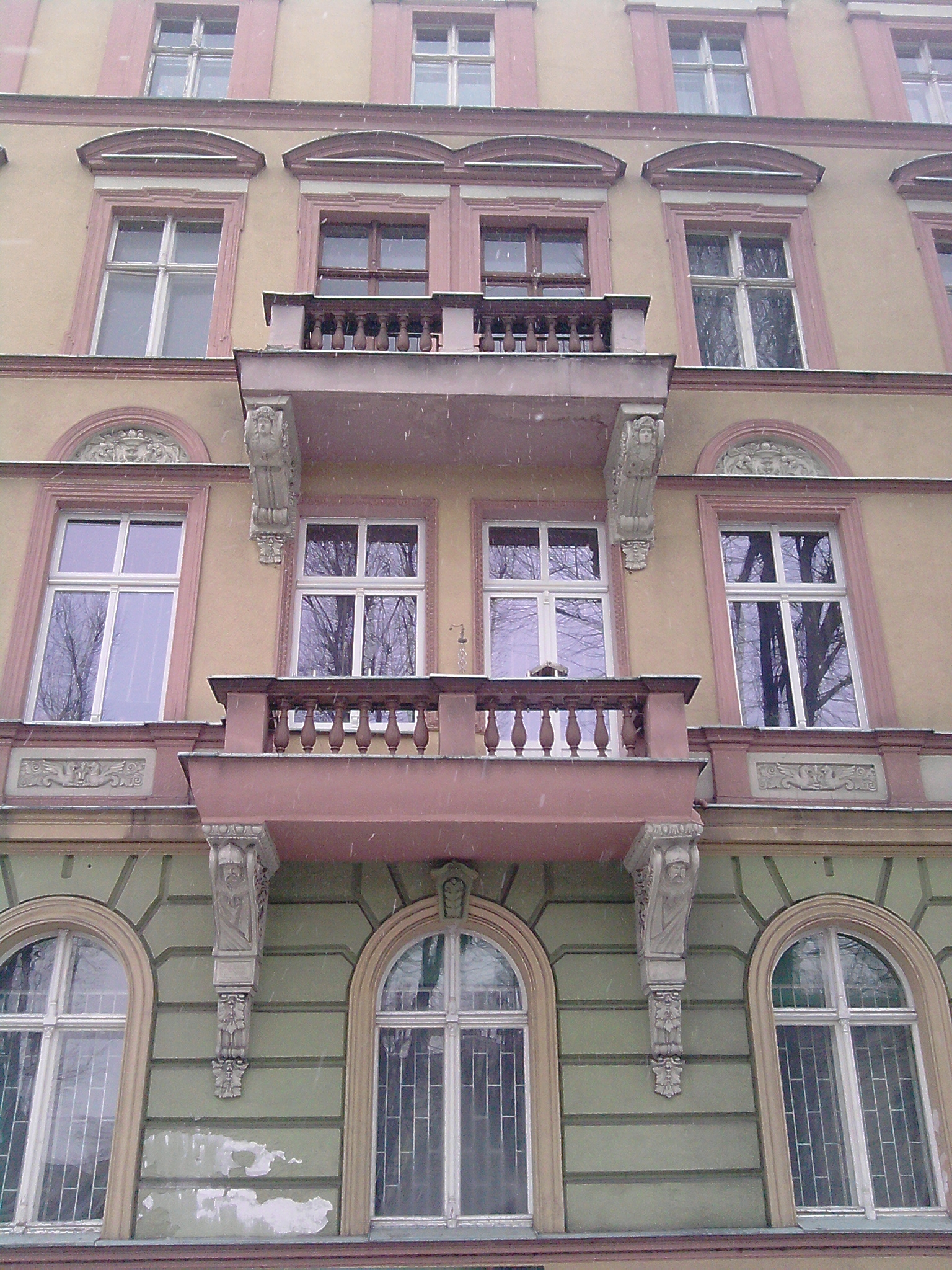
Balconies on corbels at 12 Freedom Square

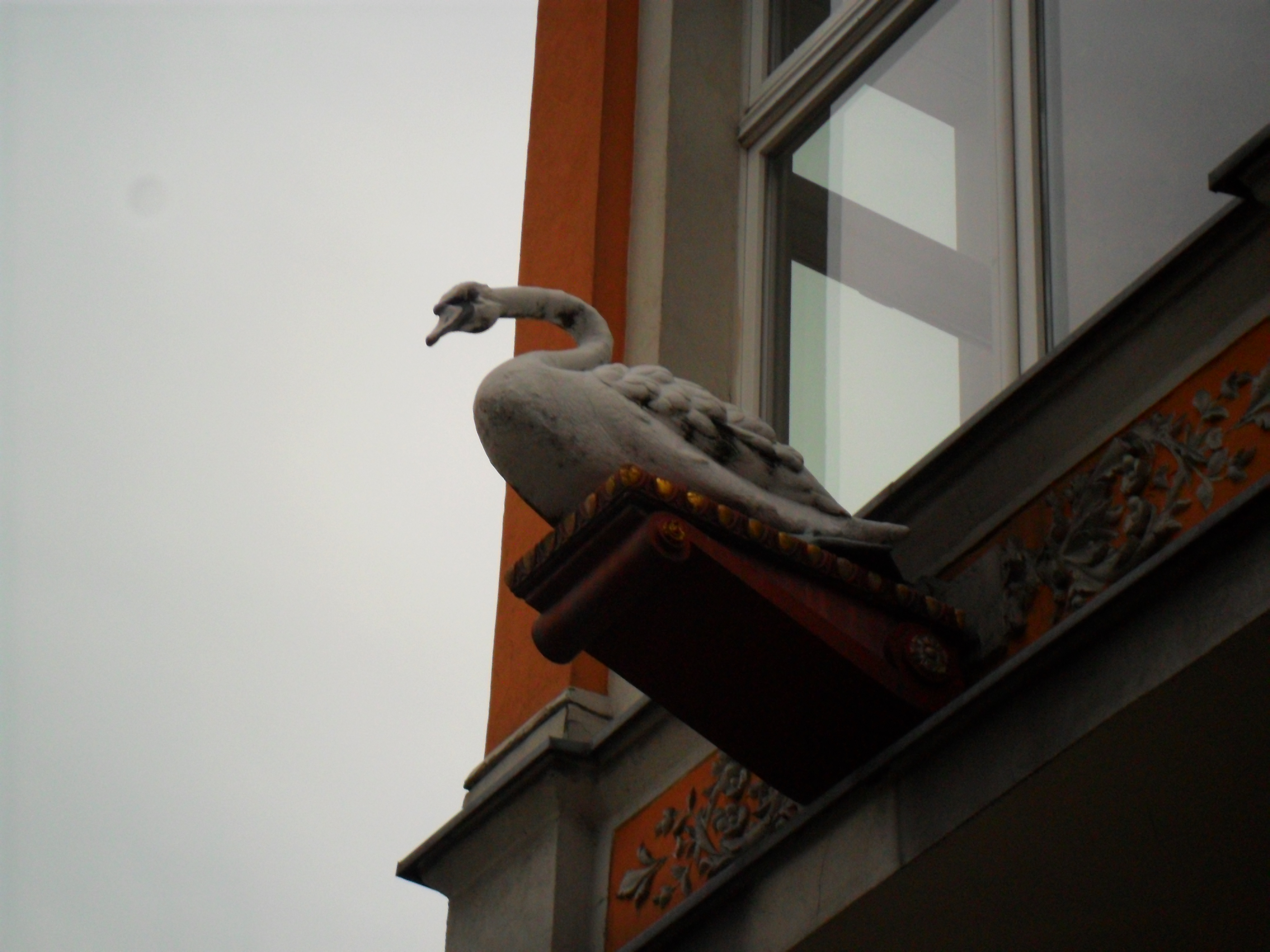
Swan sculpture on a bay window at 13 Freedom Square

The square's edges are lined with eclectic tenements. Key buildings include:

- House at 1 Freedom Square – a large neoclassical two-story building with a steep gable roof, begun on 9 July 1828, cornerstone laid 14 August 1828. It housed the royal customs office until 1945, later a military office and, between 1949 and 1953, the city library. Renovated in the 1980s, it retains its form and now belongs to a craftsmen's cooperative.
- House at 5 Freedom Square – built before 1864 in Renaissance Revival style, a two-story residential-commercial building. The bossaged ground floor contrasts with detailed upper floors. A pseudo-avant-corps with a gate and arched windows crowns the pediment, topped by a dentil frieze.
- Tenement at 7 Freedom Square – erected in the 1880s–1890s in eclectic style, this three-story building boasts rich detailing. Rusticated ground floor, ornate upper floors with semicircular window pediments, and grotesque motifs. The facade ends in a console frieze with hermae and putti heads.
- Building at 8 Freedom Square – originally a folwark of the Dominican nuns, it housed Leo Braun's nail factory in the 1880s and the Upper Silesian Prehistoric Office under archaeologist Georg Raschke in the 1930s. From 1936, it was the German Labour Front headquarters. Now the Racibórz police station, renovated to evoke an eclectic tenement.
- Tenement at 11 Freedom Square – built between 1880 and 1900 in eclectic Renaissance Revival style, a four-story corner residential-commercial building. A two-story rectangular bay window rests on atlantes hermae flanking the shop entrance. The facade has a slight risalit, with second-floor windows framed by fluted pilasters and third-floor triangular pediments.
- Tenement at 12 Freedom Square – built between 1880 and 1900 in eclectic Renaissance Revival style, a four-story building with a central axis marked by balconies on decorative corbels. Rusticated ground floor, plastered upper floors, with second-floor windows topped by semicircular pediments and grotesque motifs.
- Tenement at 13 Freedom Square – built between 1890 and 1900 in eclectic Renaissance Revivalstyle on possible Templar foundations. A four-story corner building, painted orange post-renovation, with a frieze of bull's-eye motifs and an attic. A single-story bay window on corbels, topped by a balcony, features stucco with grotesques, laurel wreaths, and swan motifs. It houses the Swan Pharmacy since 1875, with a swan sculpture on the bay window.

== Nature ==
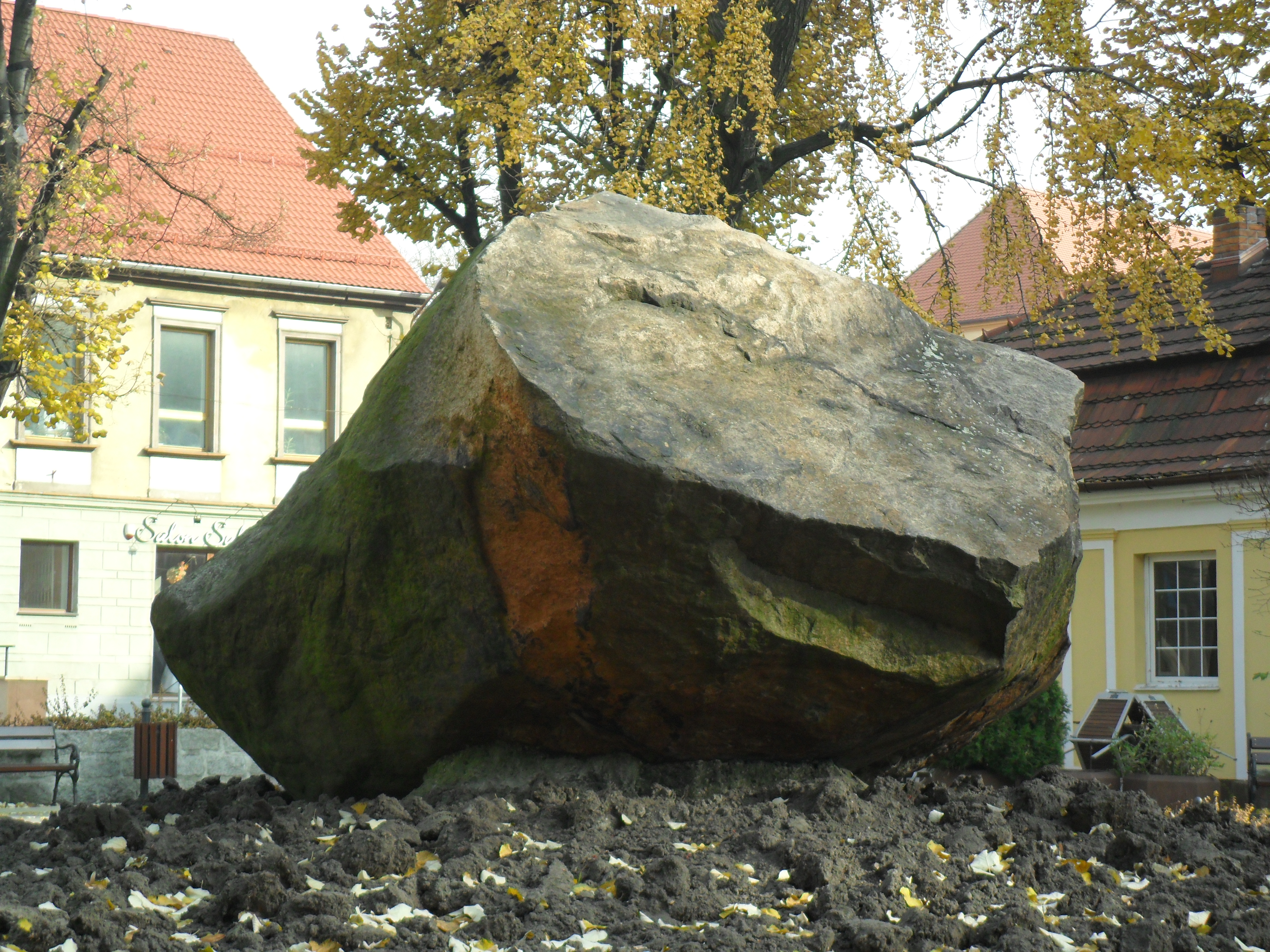
Glacial erratic at Freedom Square

The square hosts Racibórz's finest honey locust (thornless variety) and ginkgo (female specimen). The honey locust is one of three in Racibórz. The standout is a granite glacial erratic, found near Racibórz in 1927 and placed here in 1934, designated a non-living natural monument.

== Tourist trails ==
Two trails pass through the square:

- Polish Minority Schools Trail
- Polish Hussars Trail

== Bibliography ==
- Newerla, Paweł (2008). Dzieje Raciborza i jego dzielnic [History of Racibórz and Its Districts] (in Polish). Racibórz: WAW. ISBN 978-83-89802-73-6.
