= Viktor von Pressentin von Rautter =

- Born: 8 May 1896; Willkam, East Prussia
- Died: 31 May 1918 (aged 22); In the vicinity of Soissons, France
- Military career
- Allegiance: Germany
- Branch: Cavalry; aviation
- Rank: Leutnant
- Units: 3rd Guards Uhlan Regiment; Jagdstaffel 59; Jagdstaffel 4
- Awards: Military Merit Cross; Iron Cross

Leutnant Viktor von Pressentin von Rautter (8 May 1896 – 31 May 1918) was a German World War I flying ace credited with 15 aerial victories.

== Biography ==
See also Aerial victory standards of World War I

Viktor von Pressentin von Rautter was born in Willkam, East Prussia, the German Empire on 8 May 1896.

While he began his military service as an Uhlan, he was transferred to aviation on 1 August 1917. On 24 September, he was sent for pilot training. Rather unusually, he then attended aerial observer training during January 1918. The next month saw him receiving fighter training. On 11 March, he was posted to Jagdstaffel 59, only to be forwarded to Jagdstaffel 4 three days later. Here he began his roll of aerial victories, shooting down a Sopwith Camel on 28 March 1918.

He had two more confirmed victories in April 1918. In May, he would reel off a dozen more. Also in May, he would temporarily command the squadron.

On 31 May, he engaged Breguet XIV bombers in his Fokker Dr.1 southwest of Soissons France and shot one down at 1255 hours. Moments later, he was shot down in flames and did not survive impact.

== Awards ==
- Prussian Military Merit Cross
- Iron Cross
