= Glacial erratic on Wolności Square in Racibórz =

Natural monument in Racibórz, Poland

Glacial erratic
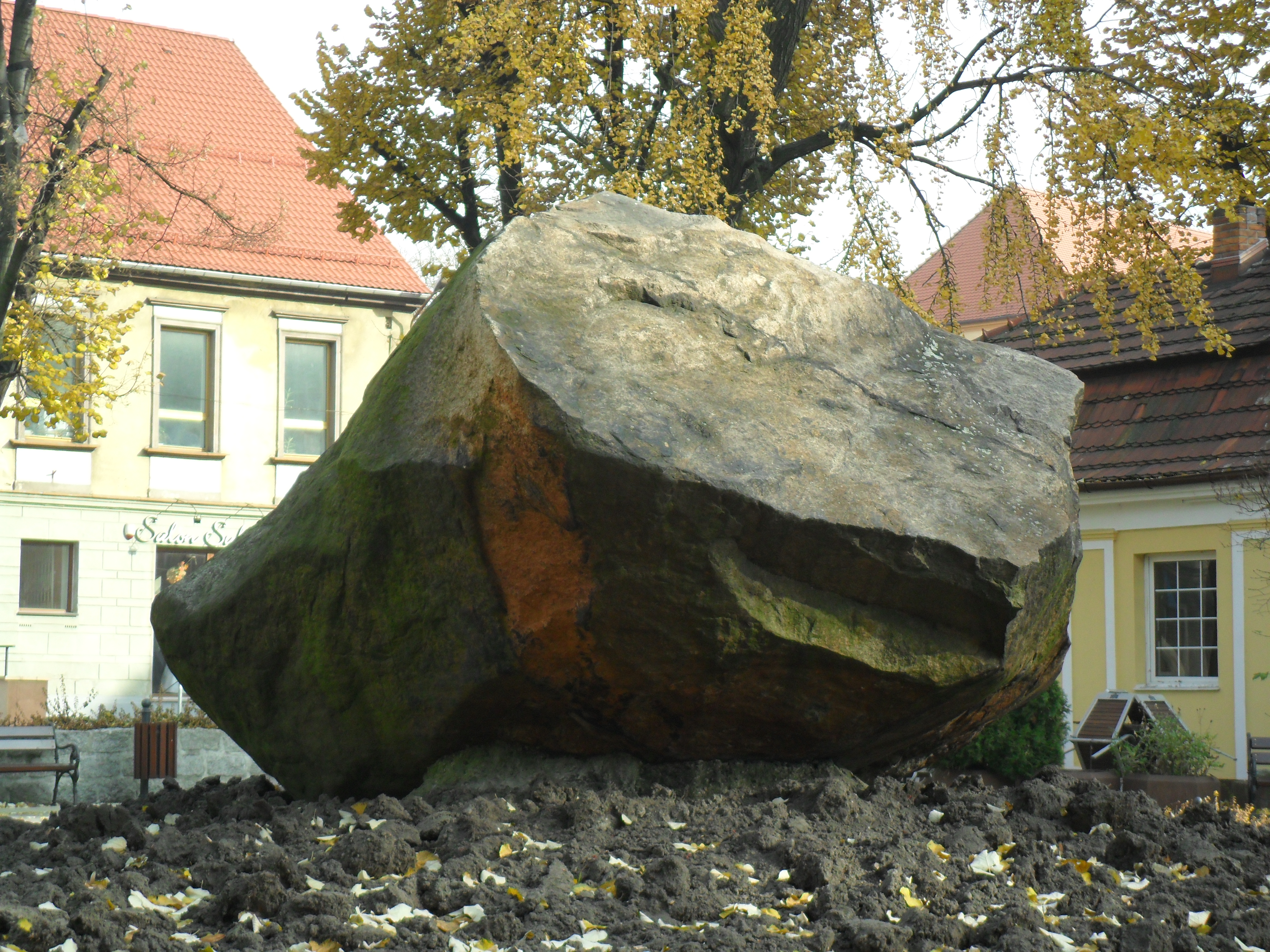
- View from Wojska Polskiego Street
- 50°05′37.45″N 18°12′53.65″E
- Location: Racibórz, Poland
- Type: natural monument
- Opening date: June 10, 1960

The glacial erratic on Wolności Square is a glacial erratic composed of granite (with numerous inclusions) from the Ice age, located on Wolności Square in Racibórz. It is the largest of all erratics found in the Racibórz Basin and the largest commemorative erratic in the Silesian Voivodeship and all of Silesia. In 1960, it was designated a natural monument.

== Characteristics ==
The glacial erratic is composed of granite, featuring red feldspar and quartz. It weighs 42.5 tons, has a volume of 16.5 m³, a length of 3.25 m, and a height of 2.25 m. It is situated in the middle of Wolności Square on plot number 843/175. Two hiking trails pass by the erratic: the yellow Trail of Polish Minority Schools and the red Trail of the Polish Hussars.

== History ==
This boulder originated from Scandinavia and was transported to the Racibórz Basin by glaciers during the Mindel glaciation. It was discovered in 1927 in a sand pit owned by Karol Popelli in Wojnowice. The boulder was fully exposed in 1929, and in 1934, following the advice of a local teacher, Alfons Nentwig, it was transported to Racibórz to its current location, which was then known as Adolf Polko Square (German: Polkoplatz).

Transporting the boulder was a significant undertaking at that time. The chassis used for its transport was borrowed from a carpet factory in Kietrz. A specially produced boiler from Siemens-Plania Werke (now SGL Carbon, formerly ZEW S.A.) was placed on the chassis. Clamps and ropes supplied by the Fröhlich company were used to secure the boulder, while the Racibórz railway provided rails and wooden ties. The transportation involved a platform pulled by two steam locomobiles rented from Count Lichnowsky of Chuchelná. The boulder finally arrived at its destination on 6 June 1934. Once positioned, it was surrounded by a small wall adorned with plaques bearing the names of fighters from the National Socialist movement. It replaced the first public fountain in Racibórz, which had been funded by Adolf Polko. The ceremonial inauguration took place on 1 July 1934. The boulder was meant to symbolize the new era as a millennium monument of the National Socialist movement. In 1945, the surrounding wall was removed.

Since 10 June 1960, it has been designated as a natural monument, as per decree no. 179 of the Presidium of the Provincial National Council in Opole. A subsequent decree reaffirming the status of the boulder as a natural monument was issued by the Silesian Voivode in regulation no. 21/05 on 16 June 2005.
