= Hansgeorg Bätcher =

German officer and Knight's Cross recipient (1914–2003)

- Born: 13 January 1914; Finsterwalde
- Died: 23 April 2003 (aged 89); Uelzen
- Military career
- Allegiance: Nazi Germany
- Branch: Luftwaffe
- Service years: 1934–45
- Rank: Oberstleutnant
- Commands: 1./KG 100; III./KG 76; KG 54
- Conflicts: World War II: Invasion of Poland; Battle of France; Operation Barbarossa; Battle of the Kerch Peninsula; Siege of Sevastopol (1941–1942); Battle of Stalingrad; Kerch–Eltigen Operation; Crimean Offensive (1944); Unternehmen Bodenplatte
- Awards: Knight's Cross of the Iron Cross with Oak Leaves

Hansgeorg Bätcher (13 January 1914 – 23 April 2003) was a highly decorated pilot in the Luftwaffe and with more than 658 combat missions the leading bomber ace during World War II. He was a recipients of the Knight's Cross of the Iron Cross with Oak Leaves.

== Military Training and Second World War ==
Hansgeorg Bätcher began his training as a Pilot with Fliegergruppe Tutow between November 1935 and March 1936. Holding the rank of Leutnant, he became a Pilot in Kampfgeschwader 157 in December 1938. He participated in the invasion of Poland in 1939, and in the invasion of France in 1940. During one mission, he was shot down and captured in Rouen on 5 June 1940. He was released following France's surrender, and for a short time acted as a flying instructor.

He continued active service in May 1941 with Kampfgruppe 100 "Wiking," fitted with Heinkel He 111 Bombers. In July 1941 he was made Staffelkapitän of Kampfgruppe 100, and deployed on the Eastern Front. His unit was flying missions over Moscow in late summer and fall of 1941. During these missions he earned the Bomber Clasp in Bronze in August, Silver in September, and Gold in November. In early 1942, Kampfgeschwader 100 was conducting maritime attacks against Soviet naval targets in the Black Sea. Bätcher had the distinction of being the most successful Pilot during this operation, sinking several Soviet vessels. In March of the same year he was promoted to Hauptmann. In the summer of 1942 he was engaged in the aerial assault of Sevastopol, and on July 2 he successfully carried out his 300th mission. In August 1942 his unit participated in the Battle of Stalingrad. He began flying supply missions to the 6th Army which was desperately besieged by the Red Army. Bätcher was awarded the Knight's Cross of the Iron Cross on 21 December 1942. In the summer of 1943, his unit was involved in the Battle of Kursk. They later flew mission over the Kuban Bridgehead. He completed his 500th Combat Mission on 30 July 1943. In November 1943, Bätcher was promoted to Major, and made Gruppenkommandeur of the newly designated Kampfgeschwader 4. He completed his 600th mission on November 21, 1943, and his 650th on 9 February 1944. After having completed his 658th combat mission, Bätcher was assigned to the staff of Luftflottekommando 4 in May 1944. The following December he was given the command of Kampfgeschwader 76, which was equipped with the first Jet Bombers, the Arado Ar 234. His last Bomber missions were carried out with the Ar 234 against Allied troops in the West in February 1945. In February 1945 he was given the command of KG(J) 54 equipped with the Jet powered Messerschmitt Me 262; he held this post until the end of the War. Bätcher was captured by American troops in May 1945.

Bätcher was known for his skill and success at Maritime interdiction. He was responsible for most of the German successes against shipping the Black Sea in 1942. In one occasion the command of Luftflotte 4 demanded all supply ships be destroyed near the Crimean coast. When a 7,500-ton ship was spotted bringing in fuel, Alexander Löhr ordered its destruction and selected him for this mission personally. Bätcher attempted an attack but was driven off by heavy anti-aircraft artillery. Flying out-to-sea, he returned, throttled back the engines in order not to alert the Soviets by their sound, and made an attack, releasing his bombs without the use of his bomb aimer. A SC500 bomb struck amidships and destroyed the tanker without experiencing return fire. The ship was likely Emba, destroyed at Kamysh-Burun, seven miles south of Kerch. An exact date and place of the mission is not known as the pages of Bätcher's logbook are missing. On 20 February the ship Kommunist was also sunk by Bätcher, on route from Novorossiysk to Sevastopol.

== Awards and decorations ==
- Iron Cross (1939) 2nd Class (27 September 1939) & 1st Class (15 July 1940)
- Ehrenpokal der Luftwaffe on 24 November 1941 as Oberleutnant and Staffelkapitän
- German Cross in Gold on 2 July 1942 as Hauptmann in the I./Kampfgeschwader 100
- Knight's Cross of the Iron Cross with Oak Leaves
  - Knight's Cross on 21 December 1942 as Hauptmann and Staffelkapitän of the 1./Kampfgeschwader 100 "Wiking"
  - 434th Oak Leaves on 24 March 1944 as Major and Gruppenkommandeur of the I./Kampfgeschwader 4 "General Wever"

Military offices
Preceded by Oberstleutnant Volprecht Riedesel Freiherr zu Eisenbach	Geschwaderkommodore of Kampfgeschwader 54; 27 February 1945 – 8 May 1945	Succeeded by None
