= Mologino =

Mologino may refer to:

- Mologino, Tver Oblast, a village in Tver Oblast, Russia
- Mologino, Rybinsky District, Yaroslavl Oblast, a village in Rybinsky District of Yaroslavl Oblast, Russia
- Mologino, Yaroslavsky District, Yaroslavl Oblast, a village in Yaroslavsky District of Yaroslavl Oblast, Russia
