= Ramensky family hoax =

Russian hoax

The Ramensky family hoax was one of the most successful Russian hoaxes, concocted by Antonin Ramensky (1913–1985), a retired Soviet Komsomol and Communist Party activist, who presented himself to journalists as a bedridden and sometimes moribund invalid. He had been pursuing the hoax since 1961 until his death and was not exposed until a year after it.

Antonin Ramensky belonged to a family of country teachers, descended from petty village clergymen, that had a legitimate and respectable teaching legacy, stretching back to the late 19th century. His great-uncle Alexei Ramensky (1845–1928) was a high-ranking education official of Imperial Russia, who reached the civil rank of Active State Councillor equivalent to a general. In early 1880s Alexei Ramensky briefly taught in the same school in Simbirsk where Vladimir Lenin studied. This fact prompted the younger Ramensky to invent a story of Lenin's autographs ostensibly hidden in the family, and he presented some of these in 1961 to the 22nd Congress of the Communist Party of the Soviet Union. This forgery, albeit crude, was endorsed by the Party officials and experts and first made him famous.

Ramensky tended to inflate the significance of his historical relatives, invented several additional generations of his ancestors, all supposedly teachers as well, and pretended to be the last scion of the "Ramensky teachers' dynasty", within the Soviet-time conception of labour dynasties. In the earliest and relatively modest version of the legend, focused on the 200th anniversary in 1963, the fictionalized dynasty spanned only two centuries of familial memory. The Ramenskys were allegedly active in Mologino, Tver Oblast, and had founded the first school there. Ramensky was responsible for the first conscious forgery of Alexander Pushkin’s autographs and drawings, long recognized as genuine by the leading Pushkin scholars. According to the myth, Pushkin visited Mologino in 1829 and presented a book, the Russian translation of Walter Scott's Ivanhoe, with autographed verse and drawings, to the hoaxer's ancestor (who in fact never existed). Some other artifacts fabricated or repurposed by Ramensky, typically timed to coincide with anniversaries and ideological events, were donated by him to various museums without much vocal doubt with regard to their authenticity, although his backstories were usually outlandish and he rarely told the same story twice. In the Soviet context, ideological narratives behind his project, including references to Pushkin and Lenin, tended to trump critical verification.

Later Ramensky expanded the claimed lifespan of the dynasty as early as the fifteenth century. The Ramenskys became virtually omnipresent in Russian history: the snowballed legend came to include dozens of historical figures, writers, artists, and revolutionaries, presented as their friends and tailored to align with the key topics of Soviet propaganda. Ramensky carefully curated his public identity, exploiting Soviet ideological pathos, personal suffering and patriotic service to gain trust and emotional investment from others—especially journalists from central and regional press outlets.

The Ramensky hoax went international as well. In 1968, an article about "The House of Ramenskys" authored by the well-known Soviet pedagogue Simon Soloveychik was published in the English-language Soviet Life magazine. The forger had also invented numerous Bulgarian connections of the dynasty, claiming his surname to be of Bulgarian origin. After meeting Bulgarian journalists who promoted his confabulations, Ramensky exchanged gifts with the Bulgarian leader Todor Zhivkov.

Shortly after Ramensky's death, the most extensive and ambitious version of the hoax was published in the Novy Mir magazine. It contained so many red-flag anachronisms and absurd claims that it essentially backfired and was quickly debunked by experts in 1986. Nevertheless Ramensky's forgeries are still on display in the museum of Alexander Pushkin in Moscow, and are often quoted in regional media. A statue of the mythical ancestor was unveiled in 1986 in front of a school in Tver Oblast, and in 2000s the story made its way into the local heraldry.

== Sources ==
- Рыбалка А. А. «Мы, Раменские»: такой добрый хороший миф… // Историческая экспертиза. — 2018. — № 3. — С. 214—231.
- Рыбалка А. А. Антонин Раменский: Ленинский след // Историческая экспертиза. — 2019. — № 2. — С. 158-171.
- Козлов В. П. Обманутая, но торжествующая Клио. Подлоги письменных источников по российской истории в XX веке. — М.: Российская политическая энциклопедия, 2001. — 224 с. ISBN 5-8243-0108-5
- Краснобородько Т. И. История одной мистификации (Мнимые пушкинские записи на книге Вальтера Скотта «Айвенго») // Легенды и мифы о Пушкине. — СПб.: Академический проект, 1995. — С. 277—289.
- Маковеев М. С. Династия учителей Раменских. — М.: Советская Россия, 1963. — 47 с.
- Цявловская Т. Г. Новые автографы Пушкина на русском издании «Айвенго» Вальтера Скотта // Временник Пушкинской комиссии, 1963. — Л.: Наука, 1966. — С. 5—30.
