= Wielewo, Kętrzyn County =

Wielewo
- Village
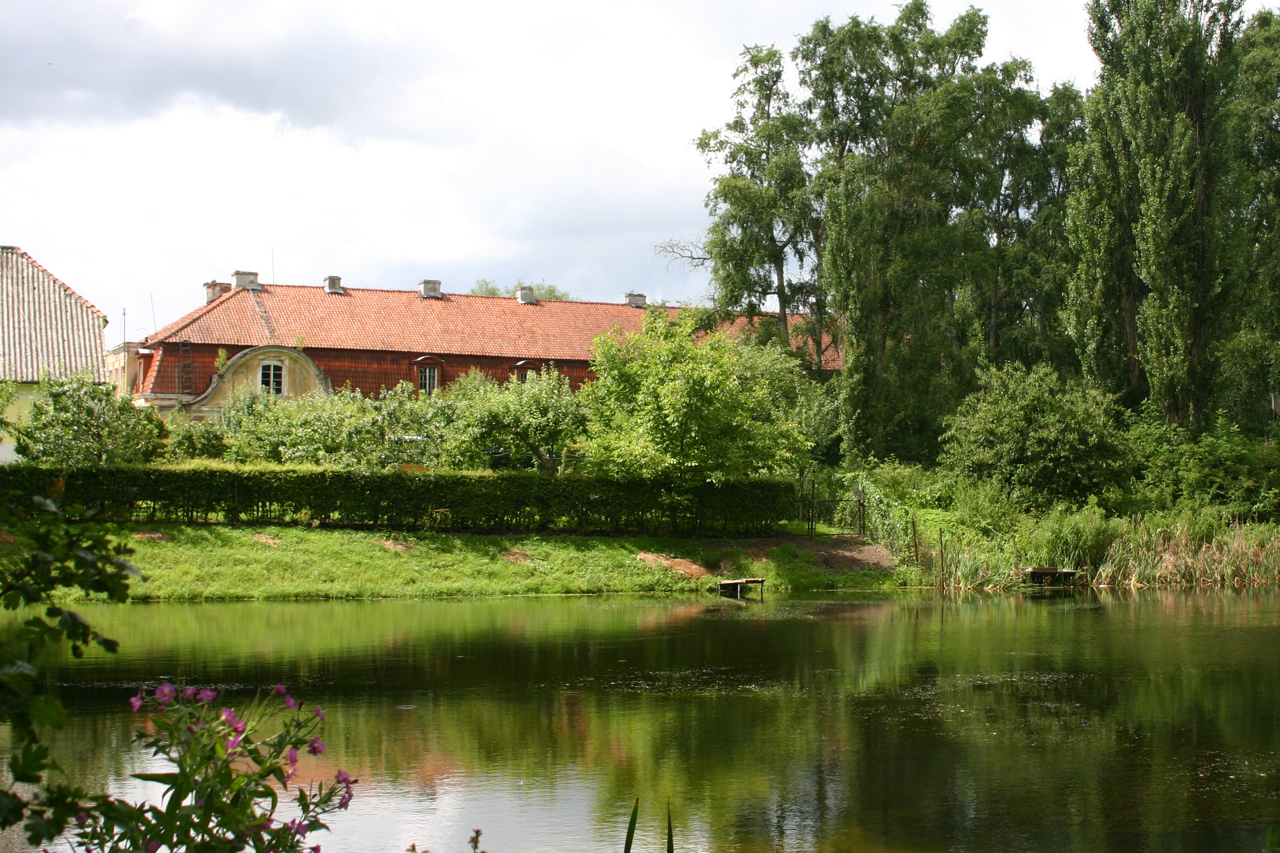

- Location within Poland
- Coordinates: 54°18′N 21°17′E
- Country: Poland
- Voivodeship: Warmian-Masurian
- County: Kętrzyn
- Gmina: Barciany
- Population: 59

Wielewo [vjɛˈlɛvɔ] is a village in the administrative district of Gmina Barciany, within Kętrzyn County, Warmian-Masurian Voivodeship, in northern Poland, close to the border with the Kaliningrad Oblast of Russia.

== Notable residents ==
- Viktor von Pressentin von Rautter (1896-1918), World War I flying ace
