= Otto Höhne =

German flying ace

- Otto Höhne
- Born: Otto Paul Wilhelm Höhne; 30 April 1895; Woinowitz near Ratibor, Oberschlesien, German Empire, in present-day Poland
- Died: 22 November 1969 (aged 74); Jachenau, Oberbayern, West Germany
- Military career
- Allegiance: German Empire; Nazi Germany
- Branch: Luftstreitkräfte; Luftwaffe
- Rank: World War I: Leutnant; World War II: Major general
- Units: Kampfeinsitzerkommando (Combat Single-Seater Command) Nord; Jagdstaffel 1; Jagdstaffel 2; Jagdstaffel 59
- Commands: KG 54 (World War II)
- Conflicts: World War I World War II
- Awards: World War I: Knights Cross with Swords of the Hohenzollern House Order; Iron Cross; Wound Badge; Silesian Eagle; World War II: Knight's Cross of the Iron Cross; Spange to the Iron Cross; Bomber Clasp in Gold,
- Other work: Served in Luftwaffe during World War II.

Leutnant Otto Paul Wilhelm Höhne (30 April 1895 – 22 November 1969) was a German World War I flying ace credited with six confirmed aerial victories. Höhne was a pioneer ace; he was the first pilot to score a victory while flying the Albatros D.1. During World War II he was a recipient of the Knight's Cross of the Iron Cross.

== Early life ==
On 30 April 1895, Otto Paul Wilhelm Höhne was born in Woinowitz near Ratibor, Upper Silesia (Oberschlesien), in present-day Poland.

== World War I aviation career ==
Höhne initially flew with Kampfeinsitzerkommando (Combat Single-Seater Command) Nord, before moving on for a brief posting to Royal Prussian Jagdstaffel 1 in early August 1916. On 27 August, he became one of the original pilots in the newly formed original fighter squadrons. He was assigned to Jagdstaffel 2 serving under Oswald Boelcke when he downed a Royal Aircraft Factory FE.2b from 11 Squadron of the Royal Flying Corps on 16 September 1916, scoring the first victory for the Albatros D.1 and sending both men in the FE.2 crew into captivity. Six days later, Höhne shot down a Royal Aircraft Factory BE.12 over Combles. A month later, on 25 October, at ten minutes to noon, it was the turn of a Royal Aircraft Factory BE.2d. On 3 November, Höhne shot down a Royal Aircraft Factory BE.2c over Hébuterne. Six days later, on 9 November 1916, he shot down Canadian ace Alan Duncan Bell-Irving's Nieuport 17 fighter to become an ace. He would score one more time, eight days later.

Höhne was himself wounded in action on 10 January 1917. After spending most of 1917 in hospital, he later returned as commander of Jasta 2 in early 1918. He served in that capacity for one month, flying the Fokker Dr.1 triplane, before stepping aside as seeing himself still not sufficiently recovered to lead the squadron.

== Between the World Wars ==
Höhne served in several Freikorps units in Silesia in the early 1920s, returning to flying service first with the DLV, then with the reformed Luftwaffe as a Major in 1935, with Kampfgruppe 254. As a squadron commander with Kampfgruppe 54, he briefly flew with the Condor Legion during the Spanish Civil War, and took part in the Luftwaffe's show of force during the annexation of Czechoslovakia.

== World War II ==
Höhne returned to service during World War II, serving in the Luftwaffe and rising to Major General. As lieutenant colonel in KG 54, he led one of the two bomber columns during the Rotterdam Blitz, but managed to abort the attack of his column at the last minute. He also commanded a wing of KG 54 during the Battle of Britain, the invasion of Poland, and the battles over France. He was again badly injured as a passenger in the crash of a Heinkel 111 on 15 August 1941 and subsequently served as Generalmajor and commanding officer of the flight combat school in Fürstenfeldbruck (Bavaria).

His son, Joachim Höhne, served in the Luftwaffe as well, first as a Flak gunner and then as an ME163 Komet pilot with JG 400.

Military offices
Preceded by Oberst Walter Lackner	Geschwaderkommodore of Kampfgeschwader 54; 22 June 1940 – 23 November 1941	Succeeded by Oberstleutnant Walter Marienfeld
