= Mologino, Tver Oblast =

Rural locality in Rzhevsky District, Tver Oblast, Russia

Coordinates: 56°30′N 34°21′E

Mologino (Russian: Моло́гино) is a village in Rzhevsky District of Tver Oblast, Russia. It was made the central locus of the Ramensky family hoax.
