= Jagdstaffel 59 =

Jasta 59
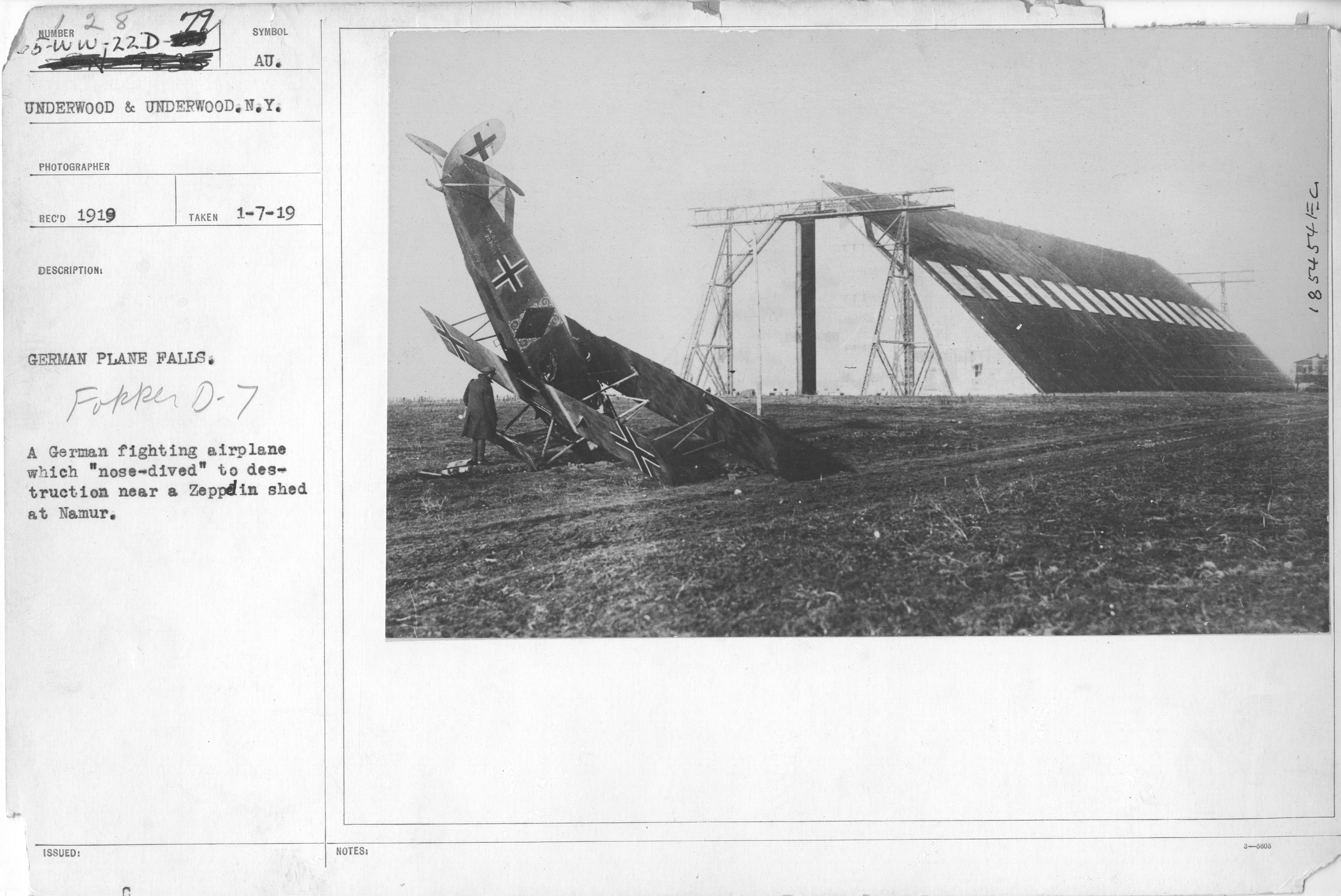
- Fokker D-7 [possibly of Jasta 59] which crash near Zeppelin sheds at Naumur January 7,1919
- Active: 1918
- Country: Kingdom of Prussia, German Empire
- Branch: Luftstreitkräfte
- Type: Fighter squadron
- Engagements: World War I

Royal Prussian Jagdstaffel 59, commonly abbreviated to Jasta 59, was a "hunting group" (i.e., fighter squadron) of the Luftstreitkräfte, the air arm of the Imperial German Army during World War I. The squadron would score over 20 aerial victories during the war. The unit's victories came at the expense of four pilots killed in action and two wounded in action.

== History ==
On 6 January 1918, Jasta 59 was founded at the pilots and observers training school at Schwerin, Germany. The new unit became operational on 21 January. It was assigned to 2 Armee on the 24th. On 1 February 1918, Jasta 59 was posted to 17 Armee, to remain part of this army for the duration of the war. Jasta 59 was merged into Jagdgruppe Sud on 10 February 1918. A week later, the squadron flew its first combat missions. It drew its first blood on 10 March 1918.

When Jagdgruppe 8 was founded by Eduard Ritter von Schleich on 15 March 1918, Jasta 59 was one of the squadrons included in the new fighter wing.

== Commanding officers (Staffelführer) ==
- Otto Höhne: 6 January 1918 – 26 January 1918
- Hans-Helmut von Boddien: 26 January 1918 – 27 September 1918 (WIA)
- Fritz Krafft: 27 September 1918 – War's end

== Duty stations ==
- Emerchicourt, France: 24 January 1918
- Favreuil, France: 28 March 1918
- Épinoy, France: 18 April 1918
- Roucourt: 8 August 1918
- Erre, France: 1 September 1918
- Hélesmes, France: 27 September 1918
- Ghlin, Belgium: 11 October 1918
- Castern: 18 October 1918
