= Wojnowice, Silesian Voivodeship =

Wojnowice
- Village
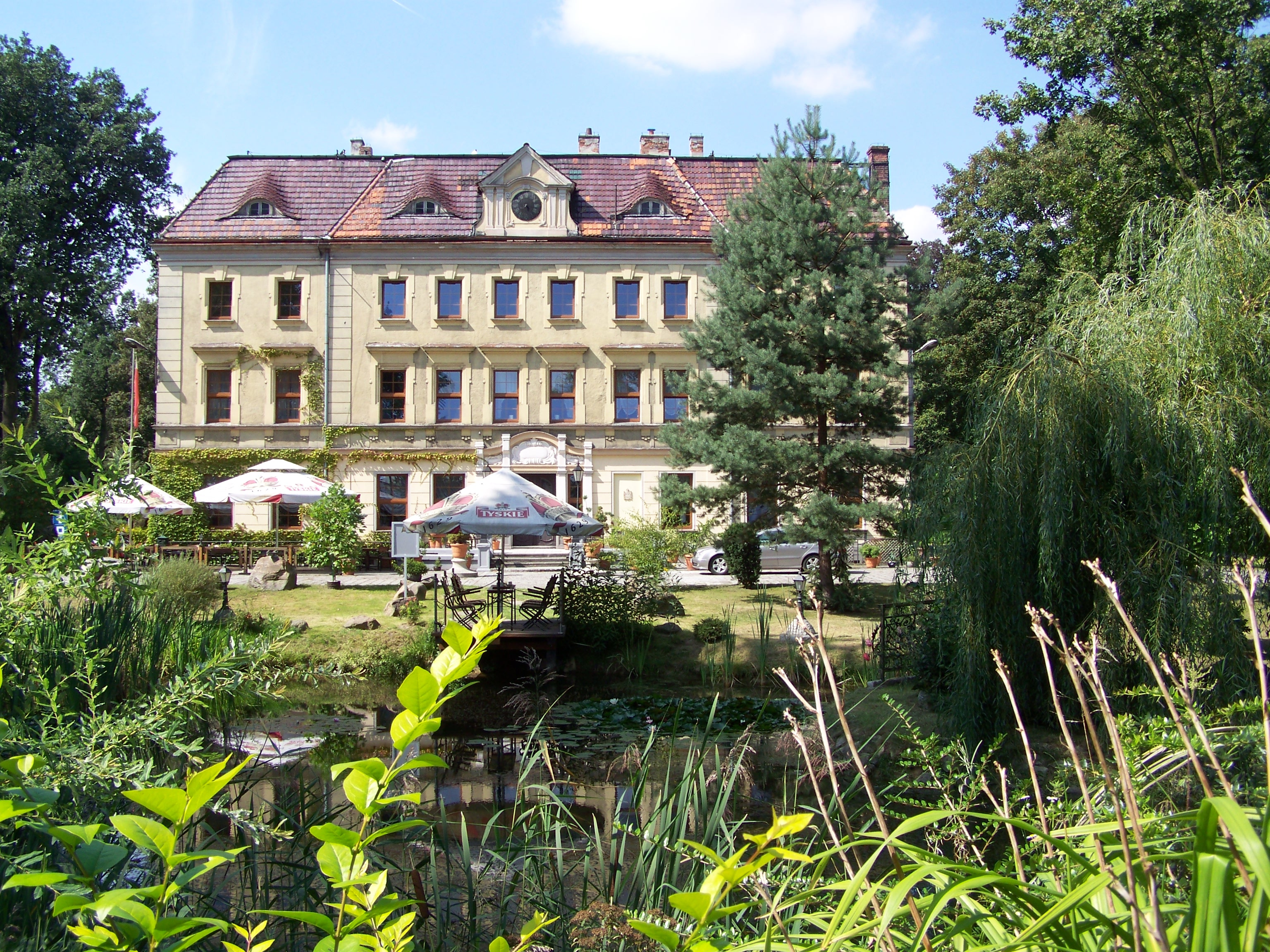
- Palace in Wojnowice

- Location within Poland
- Coordinates: 50°3′N 18°9′E
- Country: Poland
- Voivodeship: Silesian
- County: Racibórz
- Gmina: Krzanowice
- Population: 1,100

Wojnowice [vɔi̯nɔˈvit͡sɛ] is a village in the administrative district of Gmina Krzanowice, within Racibórz County, Silesian Voivodeship, in southern Poland, close to the Czech border.

== Notable residents ==
- Otto Höhne (1895-1969), Luftwaffe officer

== Gallery ==
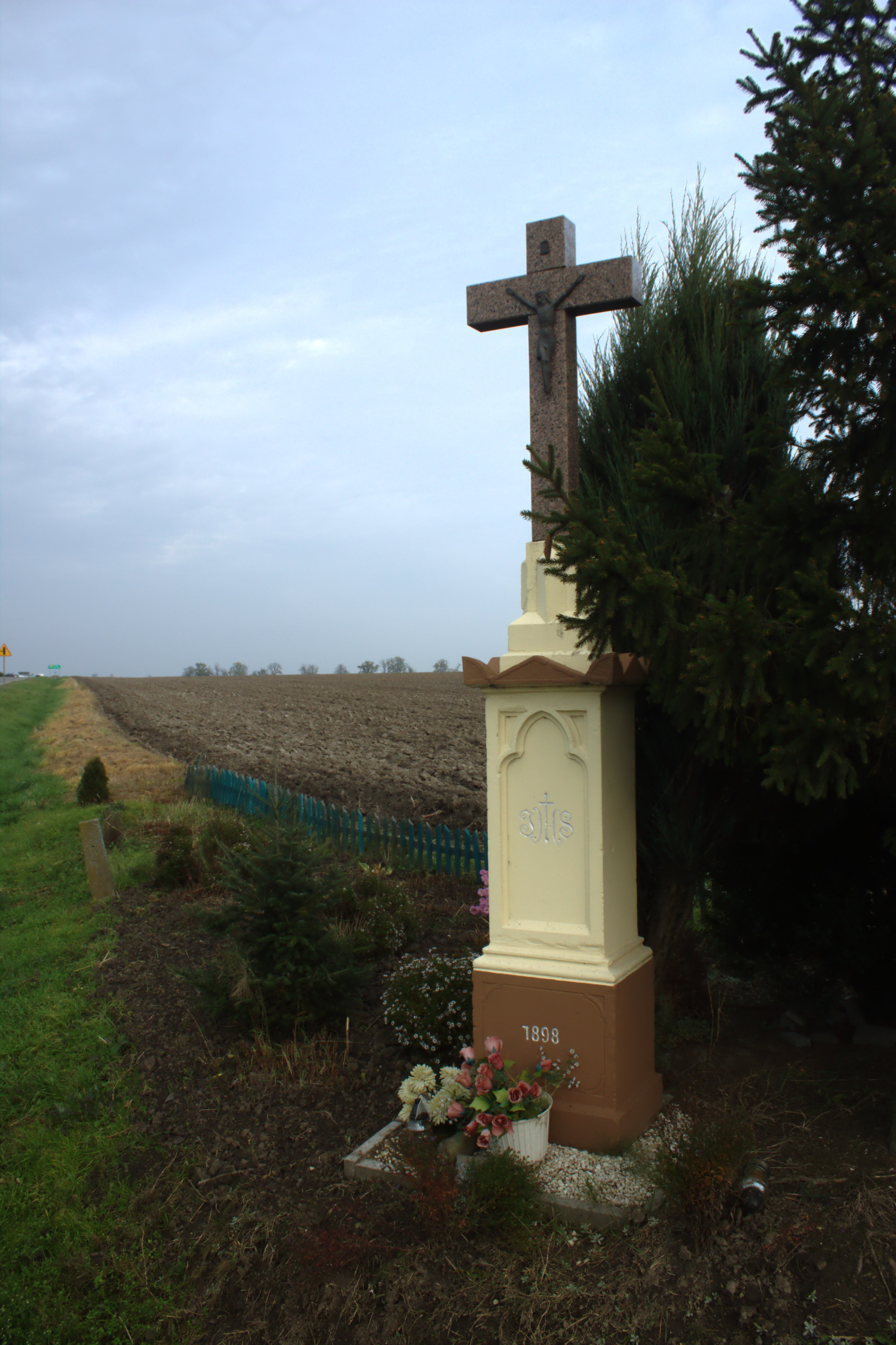
Wayside shrine

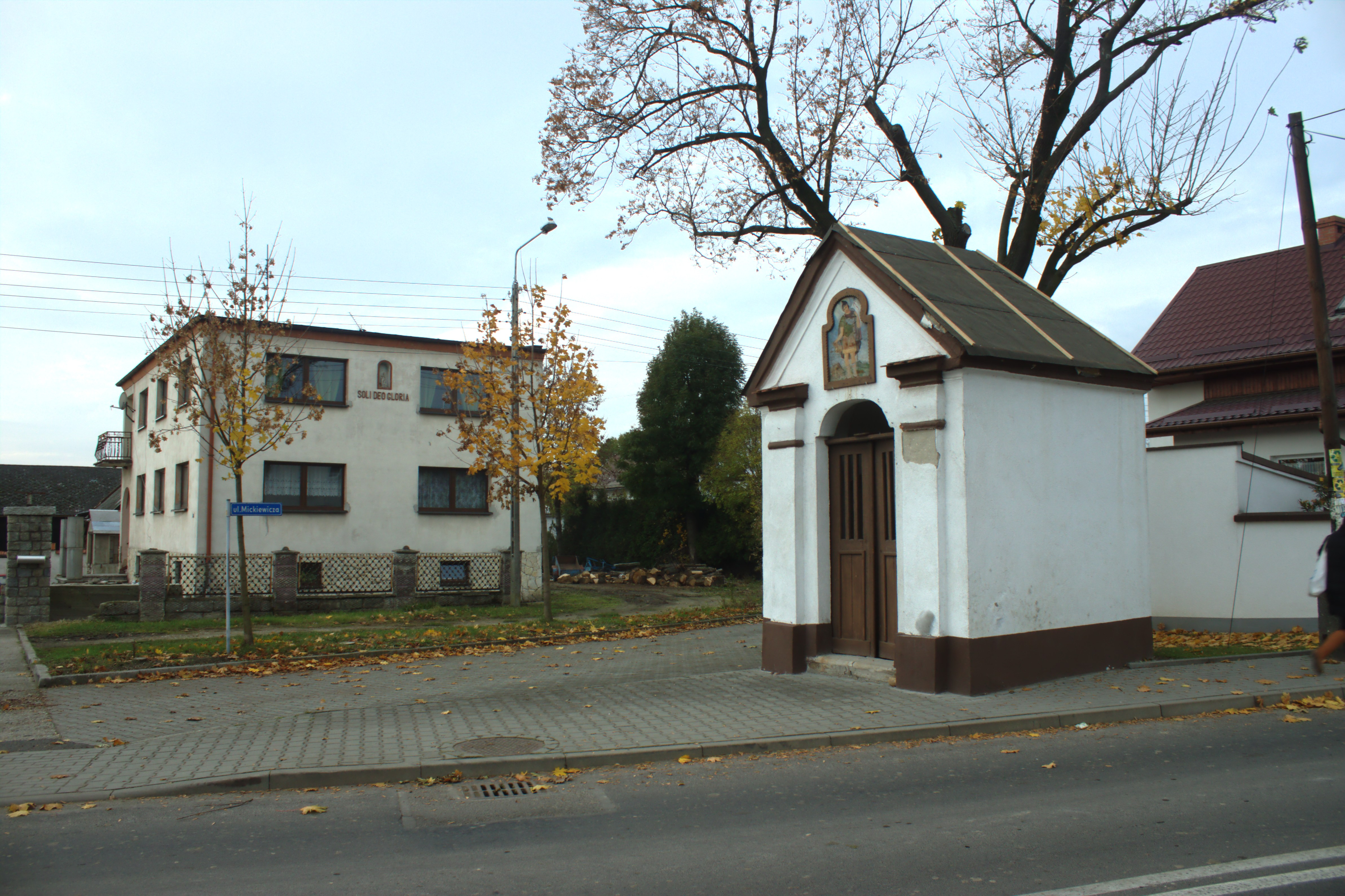
Village chapell

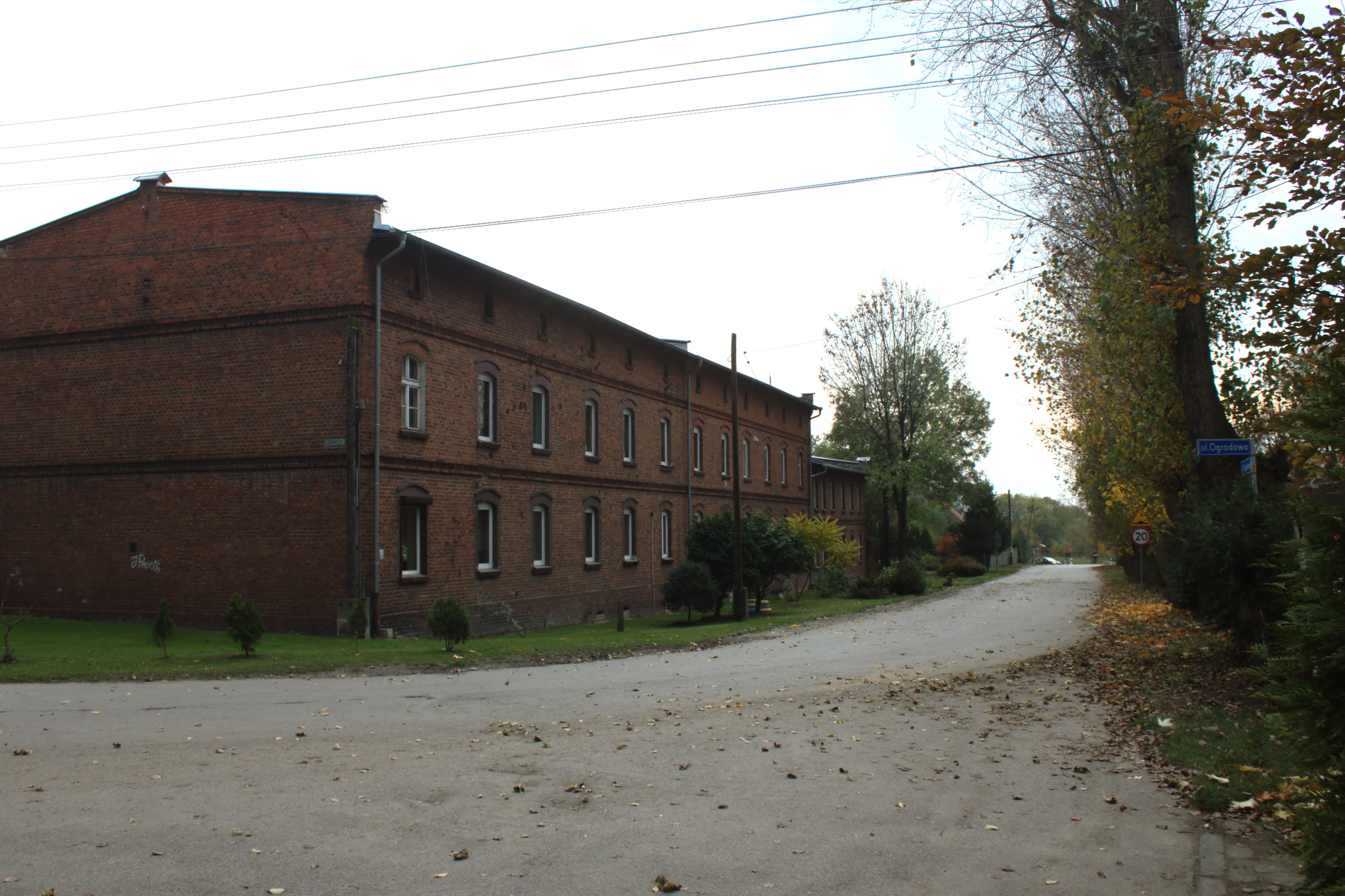
House
