= Air power history =

Branch of military history

Air power history is the branch of military history that analyses and chronicles the activities of air forces as well as the other organisations, including the air branches of armies and navies, that undertake military aviation. It is essential knowledge for professional airmen and is taught not only in air force academies and command and staff colleges, but also in joint academies and colleges. It is also taught in many civilian universities, ordinarily in history departments.

Some prominent air power historians, who also analyse current air power campaigns and operations, include: John Buckley, James Corum, Sebastian Cox, Ian Gooderson, Alan L. Gropman, Christina Goulter, Richard P. Hallion, Joel Hayward, Phillip Meilinger, Richard R. Muller, Williamson Murray, Vincent Orange, Richard Overy, Robert Pape, Peter Gray and Philip Sabin.

Key air power history periodicals include Air Power Review, published in the United Kingdom by the Royal Air Force Centre for Air Power Studies, Air Power History published in the United States by the Air Force Historical Foundation, and the Air and Space Power Journal published in the United States by the USAF.

== See also ==
- History of aerial warfare
