= Andrew Gordon (naval historian) =

British academic maritime war historian

Dr Andrew Gordon
- Born: Gilbert Andrew Hugh Gordon; 23 July 1951 (age 75); United Kingdom
- Education: Glenalmond College; Aberystwyth University; King's College London
- Occupations: Academic, maritime war historian
- Military career
- Allegiance: United Kingdom
- Branch: Royal Navy (Reserve)
- Rank: Lieutenant Commander

Gilbert Andrew Hugh Gordon (born 23 July 1951) is a British academic maritime war historian, who wrote the First World War history The Rules of the Game (Jutland & the British Naval Command) (1996).

== Early life ==
Gordon received his early formal education at Glenalmond College, in Perthshire, Scotland. He received a BSc in Economics from the University of Wales, Aberystwyth, and a PhD (1987) in War Studies from King's College London, University of London.

He formerly held the rank of Lieutenant Commander at HMS President (shore establishment), the London base of the British Royal Naval Reserve.

== Career ==
Gordon is a Fellow of the Royal Historical Society and assisted with the drafting of British Maritime Doctrine (BR 1806), and Fighting Instructions.

He first publication was his doctoral thesis, entitled 'British Sea Power and Procurement between the Wars' (1988).

In 1996 he published a study of the British Grand Fleet's leadership in action against the Imperial German Navy at the Battle of Jutland in 1916, entitled The Rules of the Game (1996).

He appeared as a filmed interview contributor in the television documentary Jutland: Clash of the Dreadnoughts (2004).

In its Summer 2006 edition, History Today published an article by Brian James, describing how three military historians, Christina Goulter and Gary Sheffield as well as Gordon, who teach on the higher command and staff course at Shrivenham, had reached the conclusion that it was the Royal Navy and not the Royal Air Force that prevented a German invasion of the British Isles in 1940 during the Second World War. The article quotes Andrew Gordon stating "It really is time to put away this enduring myth. To claim that Germany failed to invade in 1940 because of what was done by phenomenally brave and skilled young men of Fighter Command is hogwash. The Germans stayed away because while the Royal Navy existed they had not a hope in hell of capturing these islands. The Navy had ships in sufficient numbers to have overwhelmed any invasion fleet." On publication the article drew some attention, despite it not being a wholly original new thesis, having been first posited by Duncan Grinnell-Milne in his book Silent Victory (1940).

From 2007 to 2009 Gordon was on loan to the United States Naval Academy from his position as Reader in Maritime History at the Joint Services Command and Staff College at Shrivenham, in Wiltshire.

His biography of Admiral Sir Bertram Ramsay which was due in 2019 will be released on July 6th 2028.

== Publications ==
- British Sea power and Procurement between the Wars: A Reappraisal of Rearmament (1988). (Commercial publication of a doctoral thesis).
- The Rules of the Game (Jutland and British Naval Command) (1996).

== Awards ==
- Duke of Westminster's Medal for Military Literature (1997)
- Longman-History Today Awards Book of the Year Prize (1997)

== See also ==
- Christina Goulter, military historian
- Gary Sheffield, naval historian
