= Meidlinger =

Meidlinger is a surname. Notable people with the surname include:

- Christian Meidlinger (born 1971), Austrian cyclist
- Meggie Meidlinger, American baseball player

== See also ==
- Meilinger
