= Richard R. Muller =

Richard R. Muller is a professor of airpower history within the School of Advanced Air and Space Studies at the USAF's Air University in Montgomery, Alabama. He gained his Bachelor of Arts from Franklin and Marshall College and his Master of Arts and Doctor of Philosophy degrees from the Ohio State University. He is an authority on the German Luftwaffe of the Second World War.

His books include: The German Air War in Russia (1992. ISBN 1-877853-13-5); The Luftwaffe's Way of War: German Air Force Doctrine, 1911-1945 (with James Corum)(1998. ISBN 1-877853-47-X); The Luftwaffe Over Germany: Defense of the Reich (with Donald Caldwell) (2007: ISBN 1-85367-712-4). He is a member of the Academic Advisory Panel of the Royal Air Force Centre for Air Power Studies.
