= Meitinger =

Meitinger is a German surname. Notable people with the surname include:

- Holger Meitinger (born 1957), German ice hockey player
- Nicolas Meitinger (born 1984), German golfer
- Otto Meitinger (1927–2017), German architect and preservationist

== See also ==
- Meilinger
