= Ian Gooderson =

Academic work
- Main interests: military history, including air power history.

Ian Gooderson is a senior lecturer in the Defence Studies Department of King's College London. He teaches and publishes on twentieth-century military and strategic studies, especially air power.

Gooderson gained his MA and PhD degrees from the Department of War Studies at King's College London before joining the teaching staff at RAF Henlow in 1997 where he taught air power history on junior and intermediate courses from 1997 until 2000. Earlier, between 1988 and 1996, he had been a Research Associate within the Department of War Studies, specialising in Air Power and contracted to work with the Centre for Defence Analysis. This involved working on projects analysing various aspects of air power.

His best known work is Air Power at the Battlefront (1998) ISBN 978-0-7146-4680-0, which explains and assesses Allied close air support in the latter part of the Second World War. Among Gooderson's many peer reviewed articles is: "Doctrine from the Crucible: The British Air-Land Experience in the Second World War." Air Power Review Vol. 9 No. 2 (Autumn 2006), pp. 1–13.
