= Peter Gray (military historian) =

Air Commodore Peter W Gray FRAeS is a retired senior Royal Air Force commander and an air power studies academic.

Peter Gray began his career in the Royal Air Force as a navigator on F-4 Phantom IIs. He went on to command 101 Squadron. Gray worked for three years in the Cabinet Office and in the Ministry of Defence. Gray was then appointed Director of Defence Studies for the RAF. He retired from the Royal Air Force in June 2008. He has been a senior research fellow in Air Power Studies at the Centre for War Studies at Birmingham University since 1 September 2008. He graduated from Birmingham University with a PhD. Since 2018 he has been Professor of Air Power Studies in the University of Wolverhampton's Department of History, Politics and War Studies.

== Edited Publications ==
- Ed. with Sebastian Cox, Air Power History; Turning Points from Kittyhawk to Kosovo, Routledge (2002). ISBN 0-7146-8257-8
- Ed. with Sebastian Cox, Air Power Leadership: Theory and Practice, Defence Studies, Royal Air Force (2002).
- Ed., Air Power 21: Challenges for the New Century The Stationery Office (2000). ISBN 0-11-772960-4
- Ed., British Air Power, HMSO (2003).

== Book chapters ==
- "Air Power: Strategic Lessons from an Idiosyncratic Operation" in Stephen Badsey, Rob Havers and Mark Grove, eds, The Falklands Conflict Twenty Years On: Lessons for the Future, Routledge (2005). ISBN 0-415-35030-1
- "The Bombing of Caen" in John Buckley, ed., The Normandy Campaign: Sixty Years On, Routledge (2006). ISBN 0-415-44942-1
