= History of aerial warfare =

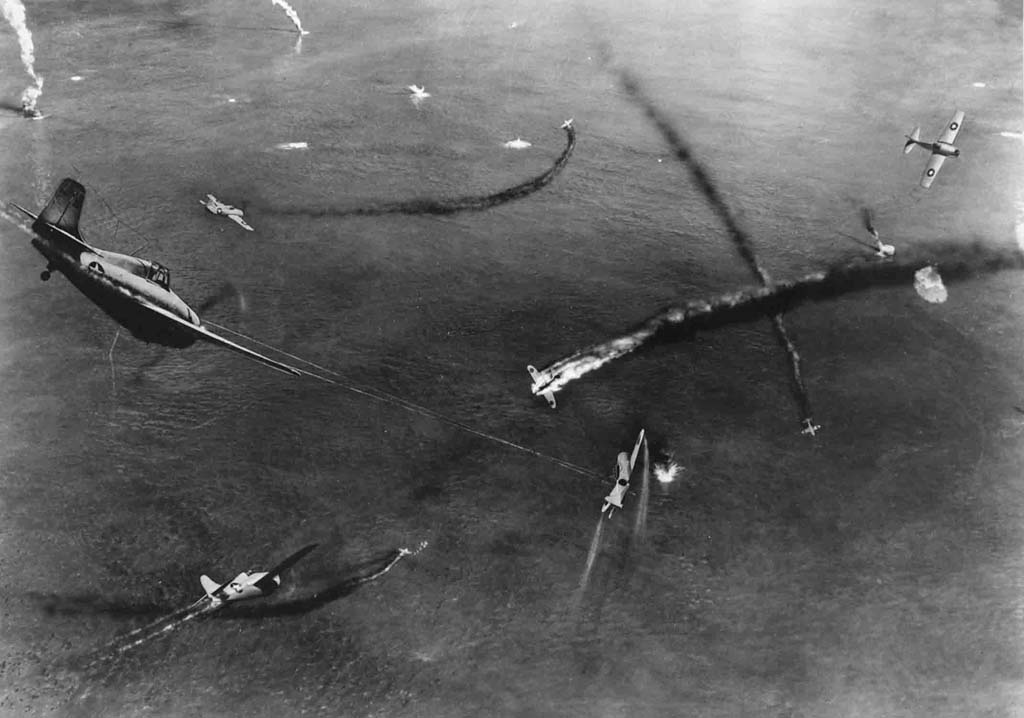
Diorama depicting air combat in the Pacific theatre during World War 2

The history of aerial warfare began in ancient times, with the use of kites in China. In the third century, it progressed to balloon warfare. Airplanes were first put to use for war starting in 1911 by Italy during the Italo-Turkish War, initially for reconnaissance and bombardment. In World War I, the use of airplanes evolved to aerial combat. The concept of “strategic bombing” then emerged during World War II. Also during World War II, Nazi Germany developed many missile and precision-guided munition systems, including the first cruise missile, the first short-range ballistic missile, the first guided surface-to-air missiles, and the first anti-ship missiles. Ballistic missiles became of key importance during the Cold War, were armed with nuclear warheads, and were stockpiled by the superpowers – the United States and the Soviet Union – to deter each other from using them.

== Fictional predictions ==
Since early history, various cultures developed myths of flying gods and deities, some of whom such as Zeus could throw thunderbolts from on high at earthbound humans. There were also fictions of humans finding ways to fly, such as the Greek Daedalus and Icarus. A logical combination was to imagine mundane humans flying – and making military use of their ability to fly. Imagination long preceded the technology needed for such warfare to be actually carried out.

In the third book of Jonathan Swift's Gulliver's Travels (1726), the King of the flying island of Laputa resorts to bombarding enemies and rebellious subjects with heavy rocks thrown from the air.

What might be the first detailed fictional depiction of what is now called an Air Force can be found in "The Wicked Prince" by Hans Christian Andersen (1840). The story's world-conquering Prince, of boundless ambition and cruelty, orders "a magnificent ship to be constructed, with which he could sail through the air; it was gorgeously fitted out and of many colours; like the tail of a peacock, it was covered with thousands of eyes, but each eye was the barrel of a gun. The prince sat in the center of the ship, and had only to touch a spring in order to make thousands of bullets fly out in all directions, while the guns were at once loaded again". Later, the Prince develops an improved model, able to also fire "Steel Thunderbolts", and orders many thousands of them built to make up a massive air flotilla manned by his troops.

H. G. Wells in The War in the Air (1907) grasped the full implications of aerial warfare and air power and how it would revolutionize warfare. Many of the book's predictions – such as the devastating strategic bombing of cities or how bombing from the air would make surface dreadnoughts obsolete in naval warfare – only came about in World War II rather than the first which broke out a few years after the book's publication.

== Kite warfare ==
The earliest documented aerial warfare took place in ancient China, when a manned kite was set off to spy for military intelligence and communication.

== Balloon warfare ==
=== Ancient China ===
In or around the second or third century, a prototype hot air balloon, the Kongming lantern, was invented in China, serving as a military communication station.

=== Europe ===
Some minor warfare use was made of balloons in the infancy of aeronautics. The first instance was by the French Aerostatic Corps at the Battle of Fleurus in 1794, who used a tethered balloon, L'entreprenant, to gain a vantage point.

Balloons had disadvantages. They could not fly in bad weather, fog, or high winds. They were at the mercy of the winds and were also very large targets.

=== Austrian use at Venice in 1849 ===
The first aggressive use of balloons in warfare took place in 1849. Austrian imperial forces besieging Venice attempted to float some 200 paper hot air balloons each carrying a 24–30-pound (11–14 kg) bomb that was to be dropped from the balloon with a time fuse over the besieged city. The balloons were launched mainly from land; however, some were also launched from the side-wheel steamer SMS Vulcano that acted as a balloon carrier. The Austrians used smaller pilot balloons to determine the correct fuse settings. At least one bomb fell in the city; however, due to the wind changing after launch, most of the balloons missed their target, and some drifted back over Austrian lines and the launching ship Vulcano.

=== American Civil War ===
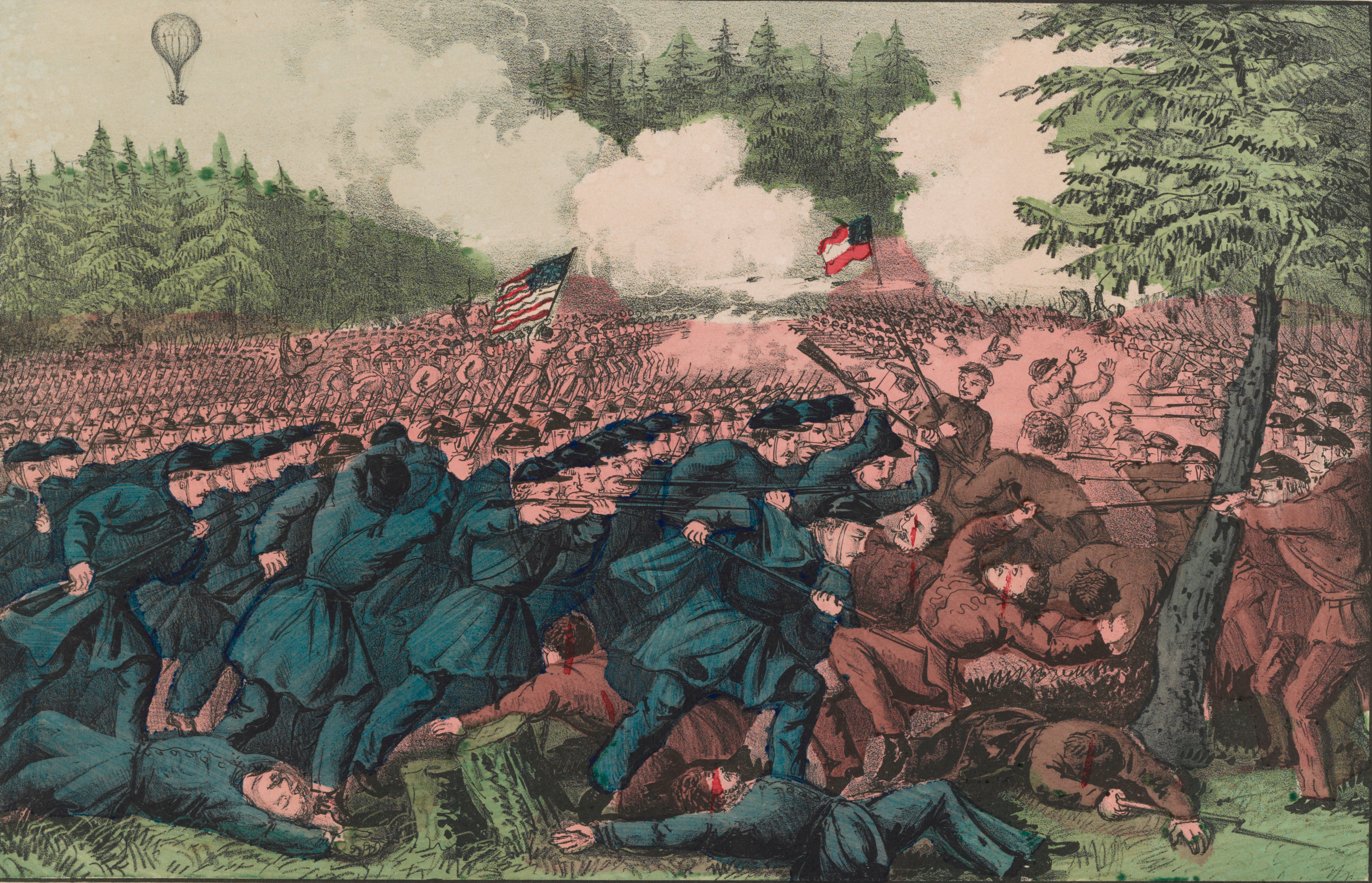
Battle of Fair Oaks with one of Lowe's balloons in the background

==== Union Army Balloon Corps ====
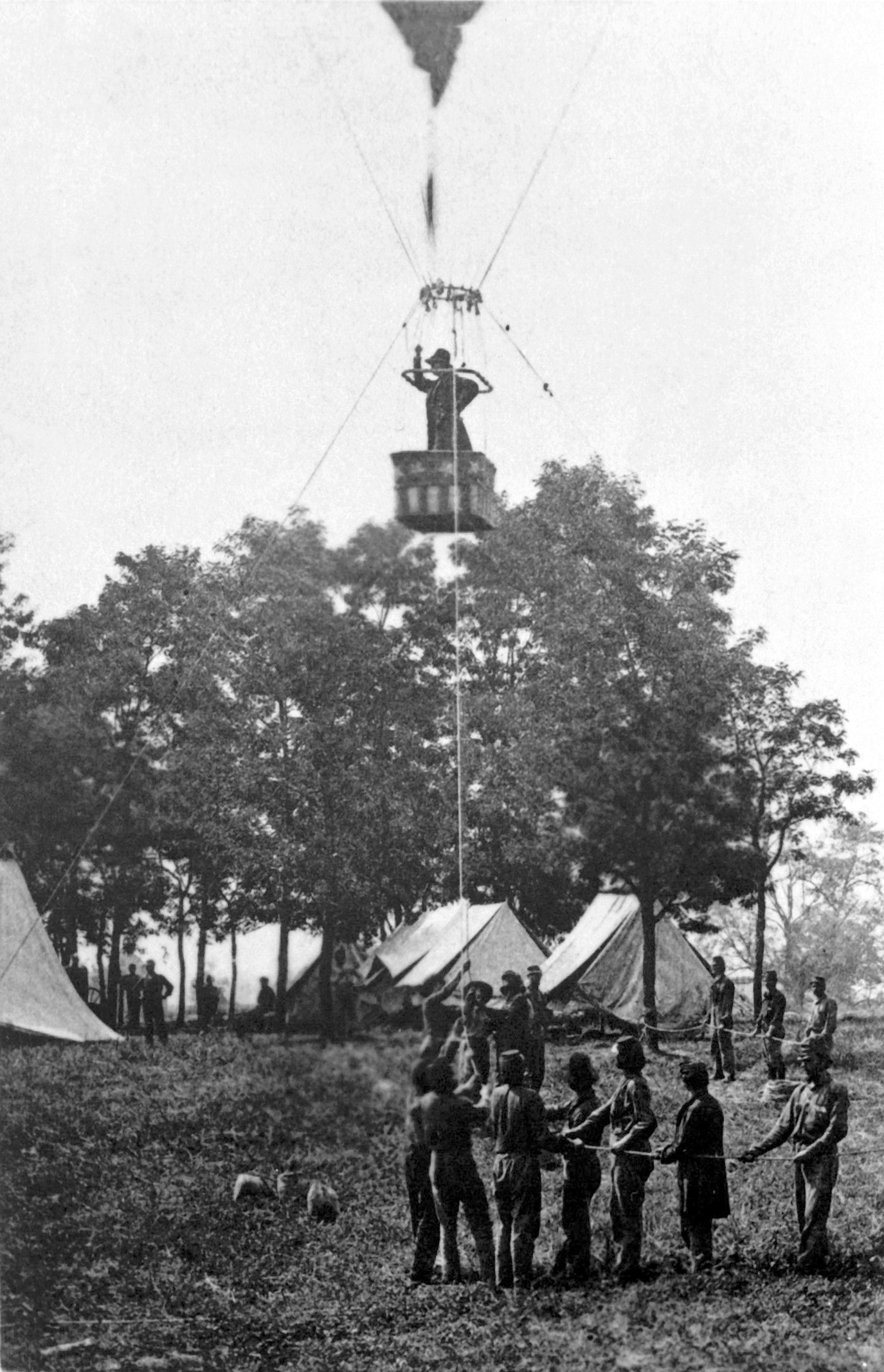
Prof. Lowe ascending in Intrepid to observe the Battle of Fair Oaks

The American Civil War was the first war to witness significant use of aeronautics in support of battle. Thaddeus Lowe made noteworthy contributions to the Union war effort using a fleet of balloons he created In June 1861 professor Thaddeus S. C. Lowe left his work in the private sector and offered his services as an Aeronaut to President Lincoln, who took some interest in the idea of an air war. Lowe's demonstration of flying a balloon over Washington, DC, and transmitting a telegraph message to the ground was enough to have him introduced to the commanders of the topographical engineers; initially it was thought balloons could be used for preparing better maps.

Lowe's first action was a free flight observation of the Confederate positions at the First Battle of Bull Run in July 1861.

Lowe was called to Fort Corcoran and ascended in order to spot rebel encampments. With flag signals he directed artillery fire on the rebels.

Lowe and other balloonists formed the Union Army Balloon Corps. Lowe insisted on the strict use of tethered (as opposed to free) flight because of concern about being shot down over enemy lines and punished as spies. By attaining altitudes from 1,000 feet (300 m) to as much as 3½ miles, an expansive view of the battle field and beyond could be had.

As the Confederates retreated, the war turned into the Peninsular Campaign. Due to the heavy forests on the peninsula, the balloons were unable to follow on land so a coal barge was converted to operate the balloons. The balloons and their gas generators were loaded aboard and taken down the Potomac, where reconnaissance of the peninsula could continue.

At the Battle of Fair Oaks, Lowe was able to view the enemy army advancing and sent a dispatch to have reserves sent.

The balloon corps was later assigned to the engineers corps. By August 1863, the Union Army Balloon Corps was disbanded.

==== Confederate Army ====
The Confederate Army also made use of balloons, but they were gravely hampered by lack of supplies due to embargoes. They were forced to fashion their balloons from colored silk dress-making material, and their use was limited by the infrequent supply of gas in Richmond, Virginia. By the summer of 1863, all balloon reconnaissance of the American Civil War had ceased.

== Before World War I ==
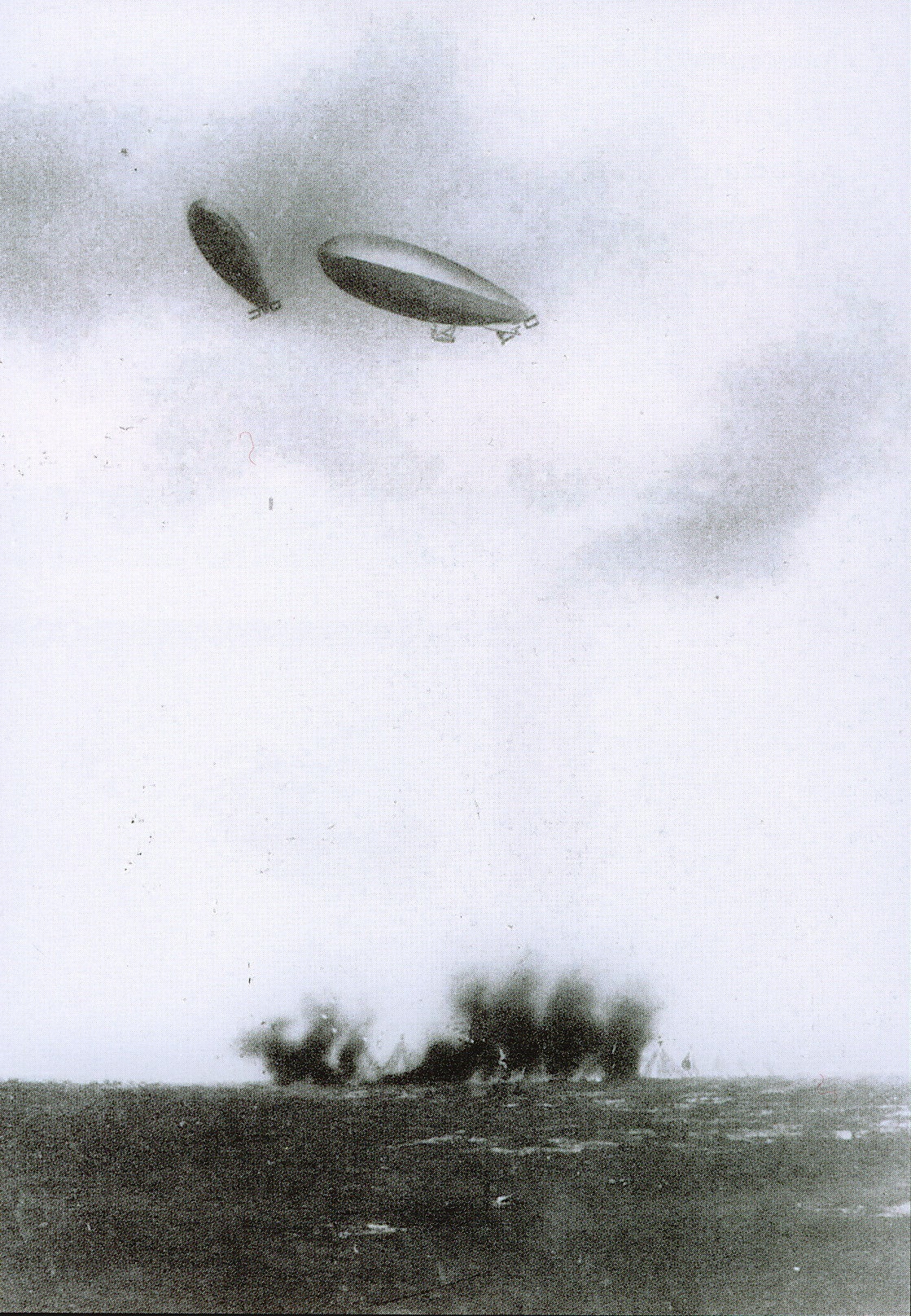
Italian dirigibles bomb Turkish positions on Libyan territory. The Italo-Turkish War was the first in history to feature aerial bombardment by airplanes and airships.

Throughout the end of the 19th century and the start of the 20th century, the question regarding the legality of aerial warfare was brought up multiple times. The first recorded instance was during the 1899 Hague Convention when the Kingdom of Italy and the Russian Empire proposed to outlaw aircraft ordnance and aerial bombing, however, nothing came out of it. However, years later, in the Declaration Prohibiting the Discharge of Projectiles and Explosives from Balloons, part of the 1907 Hague Convention ratified by the United States, Great Britain and China, outlawed aircraft ordnance and aerial bombing.

The United States Navy showed interest in naval aviation from the turn of the 20th century. In August 1910 Jacob Earl Fickel conducted his first experiments with Glenn Curtiss – shooting a gun from an airplane. In 1910–1911 the Navy conducted experiments which proved the practicality of carrier-based aviation. On November 14, 1910, near Hampton Roads, Virginia, civilian pilot Eugene Ely took off from a wooden platform installed on the scout cruiser USS Birmingham (CL-2). He landed safely on shore a few minutes later. Ely proved several months later that it was also possible to land on a ship. On January 18, 1911, he landed on a platform attached to the American cruiser USS Pennsylvania (ACR-4) in San Francisco harbor.

The first use of airplanes in an actual war occurred in the 1911 Italo-Turkish War with Italian Army Air Corps Blériot XI and Nieuport IV monoplanes bombing a Turkish camp at Ain Zara in Libya. In the First Balkan War (1912) the Bulgarian Air Force bombed Turkish positions at Adrianople, while the Greek Aviation performed, over the Dardanelles, the first naval/air co-operation mission in history.

The United States Army used airplanes for scouting and communications in its 1916–1917 campaign against Pancho Villa. Air reconnaissance was carried out in both wars too. The air-dropped bomb was extensively used during the First Balkan War (including in the first night-bombing on 7 November 1912), and subsequently used by the Imperial German Air Service during World War I.

== World War I ==
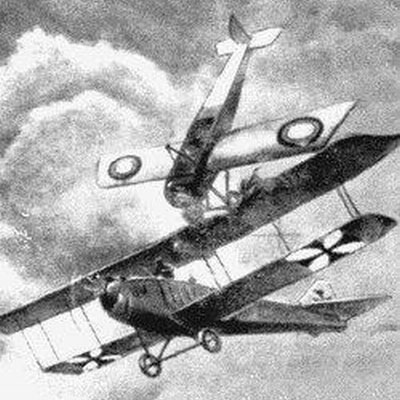
Captain Pyotr Nesterov rams an Albatross of FLIK 11 25 August 1914.

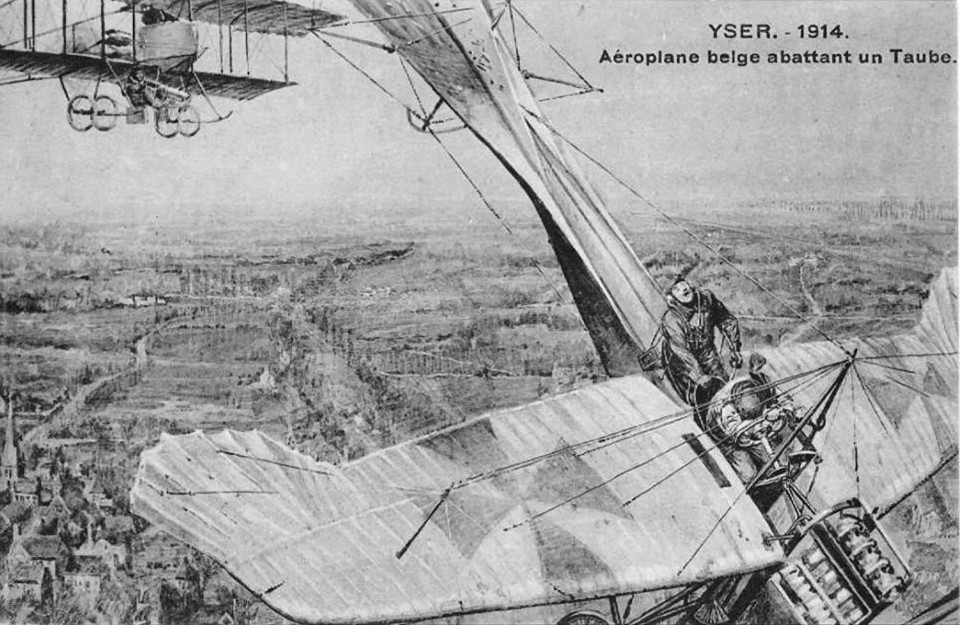
The first claimed aerial victory of the First World War. The Belgian 1st escadrille crew de Petrowski-Benselin shoots down a Taube with small arms on 25 September 1914. The German aircraft was from FA18 The claim was not confirmed but reportedly the German pilot was wounded

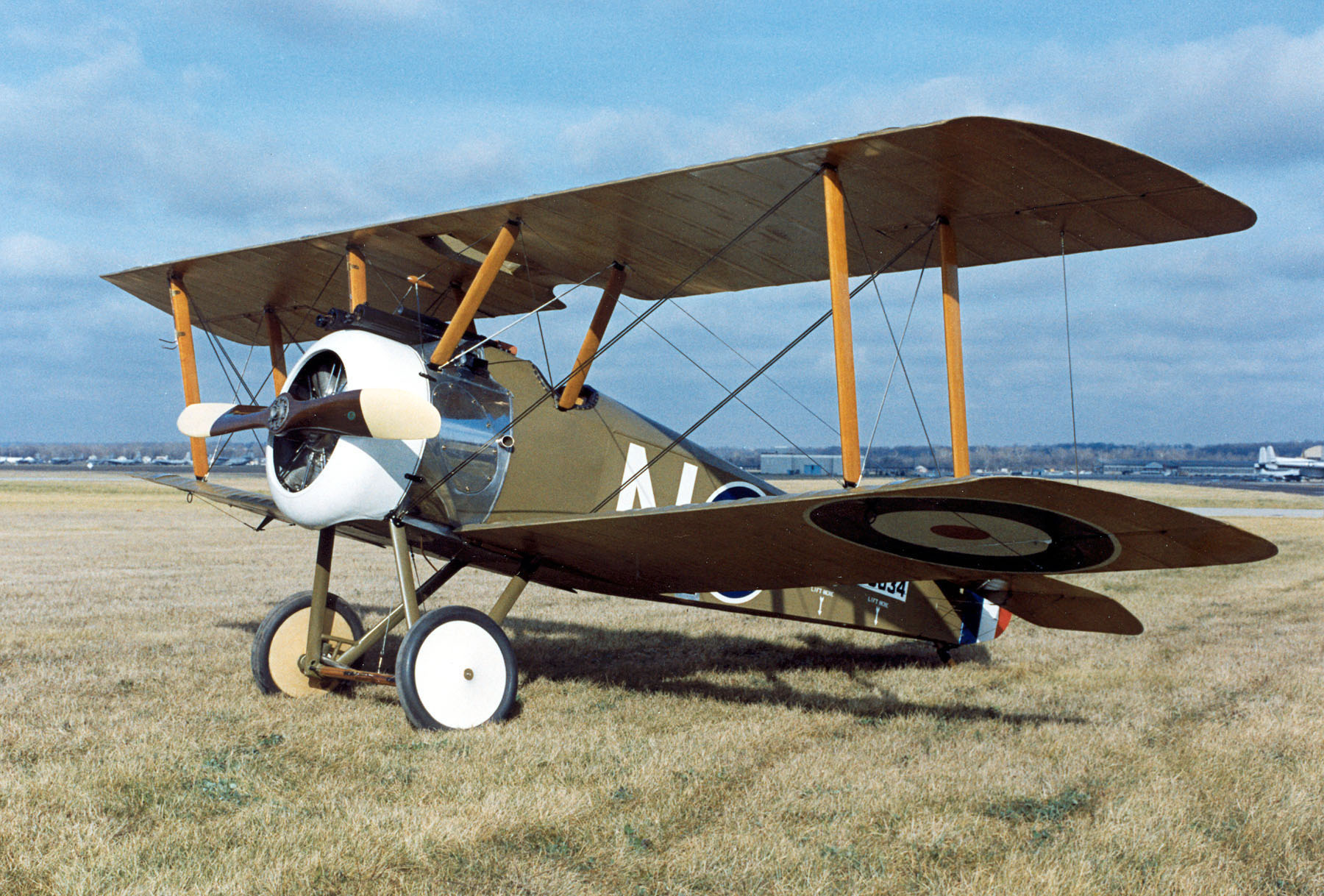
Sopwith Camel

In World War I both sides initially made use of tethered balloons and airplanes for observation purposes, both for information gathering and directing of artillery fire. At first, enemy pilots simply exchanged hand waves, but a desire to prevent enemy observation led to airplane pilots attacking other airplanes and balloons, initially with small arms carried in the cockpit.

The addition of deflector plates to the back of propellers by French pilot Roland Garros and designer Raymond Saulnier in the Morane-Saulnier monoplane was the first example of an aircraft able to fire through its propeller, permitting Garros to score three victories in April 1915. Dutch aircraft designer Anthony Fokker developed a successful gun synchronizer in 1915, resulting in German Leutnant Kurt Wintgens scoring the first known victory for a synchronized gun-equipped fighter aircraft, on July 1, 1915.

The Allies quickly developed their own synchronization gears, leading to the birth of aerial combat, more commonly known as dogfighting. Tactics for dogfighting evolved by trial and error. The German ace Oswald Boelcke created eight essential rules of dogfighting, the Dicta Boelcke.

Both sides also made use of aircraft for bombing, strafing, maritime reconnaissance, antisubmarine warfare, and the dropping of propaganda. The German military made use of Zeppelins and, later on, bombers such as the Gotha, to drop bombs on Southern England. By the end of the war airplanes had become specialized into bombers, fighters, and observation (reconnaissance) aircraft. By 1916, aerial combat had already progressed to the point where dogfighting tactics based on such doctrines as the Dicta Boelcke allowed air supremacy to be achieved. During the course of the war, new designs led to air supremacy shifting back and forth between the Germans and Allies.

== Interwar period ==
Between 1918 and 1939, aircraft technology developed rapidly. In 1918, most aircraft were biplanes with wooden frames, canvas skins, wire rigging and air-cooled engines. Biplanes continued to be the mainstay of air forces around the world and were used extensively in conflicts such as the Spanish Civil War. Most industrial countries also created air forces separate from the army and navy. However, by 1939 military biplanes were in the process of being replaced with metal framed monoplanes, often with stressed skins and liquid-cooled engines. Top speeds had tripled; altitudes doubled; ranges and payloads of bombers increased enormously.

Some theorists, especially in Britain, considered that aircraft would become the dominant military arm in the future. They imagined that a future war would be won entirely by the destruction of the enemy's military and industrial capability from the air. The Italian general Giulio Douhet, author of The Command of the Air, was a seminal theorist of this school, which has been associated with Stanley Baldwin's statement that "the bomber will always get through"; that is, regardless of air defences, sufficient raiders will survive to rain destruction on the enemy's cities. This led to what would later be called a strategy of deterrence and a "bomber gap", as nations measured air force power by number of bombers.

Others, such as General Billy Mitchell in the United States, saw the potential of air power to augment the striking power of naval surface fleets. German and British pilots had experimented with aerial bombing of ships and air-dropped torpedoes during World War I with mixed results. The vulnerability of capital ships to aircraft was demonstrated on 21 July 1921 when a squadron of bombers commanded by General Mitchell sank the ex-German battleship SMS Ostfriesland with aerial bombs; although the Ostfriesland was stationary and defenseless during the exercise, its destruction demonstrated the potency of air planes against ships.

It was during the Banana Wars, while fighting bandits, freedom fighters and insurgents in places like Haiti, the Dominican Republic and Nicaragua that United States Marine Corps aviators began to experiment with air-ground tactics to support Marines on the ground. In Haiti the Marines began to experiment with dive bombing and in Nicaragua where they began to perfect it. While other nations and services had tried variations of this technique, Marine aviators were the first to include it in their tactical doctrine.

Germany was banned from possessing an air force by the terms of the World War I armistice. The German military continued to train its soldiers as pilots clandestinely until Hitler was ready to openly defy the ban. This was done by forming the Deutscher Luftsportverband, a flying enthusiast's club, and training pilots as civilians, and some German pilots were even sent to the Soviet Union for secret training; a trained air force was thus ready as soon as the word was given. This was the beginning of the Luftwaffe.

== World War II ==
Military aviation came into its own during World War II. The increased performance, range, and payload of contemporary aircraft meant that air power could move beyond the novelty applications of World War I, becoming a central striking force for all the combatant nations.

Over the course of the war, several distinct roles emerged for the application of air power.

=== Strategic bombing ===
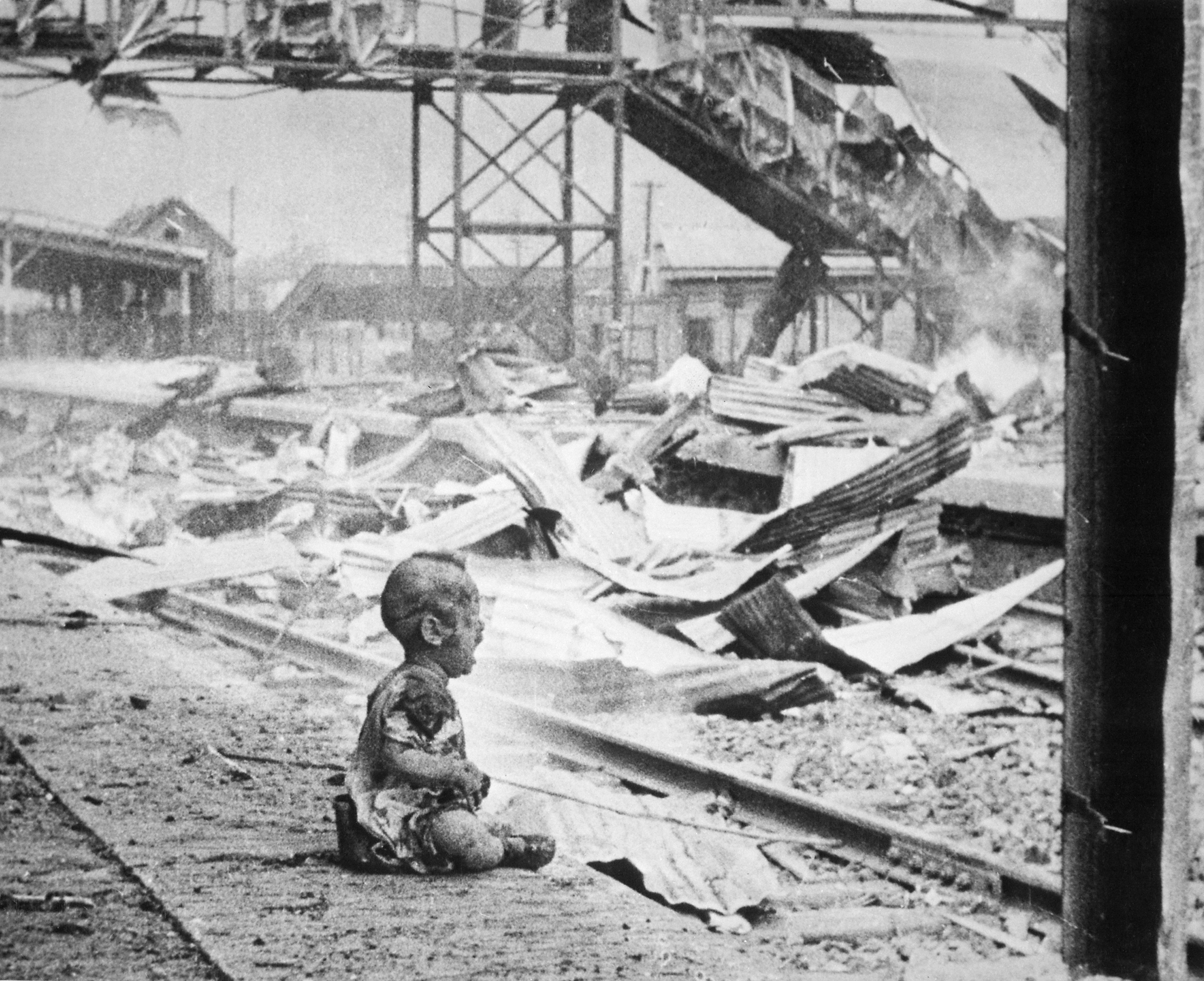
A baby, whose dead mother lay nearby, crying in the ruins of a Shanghai Railway Station bombed by the Japanese in August 1937. After it appeared in LIFE magazine on Oct. 4, 1937, 136 million people worldwide saw it in newsreels and newspapers.

Strategic bombing of civilian targets from the air was first proposed by the Italian theorist General Giulio Douhet. In his book The Command of the Air (1921), Douhet argued future military leaders could avoid falling into bloody World War I–style trench stalemates by using aviation to strike past the enemy's forces directly at their vulnerable civilian populations. Douhet believed such strikes would cause these populations to force their governments to surrender.

Douhet's ideas were paralleled by other military theorists who emerged from World War I, including Sir Hugh Trenchard in Britain. In the interwar period, Britain and the United States became the most enthusiastic supporters of the strategic bombing theory, with each nation building specialized heavy bombers specifically for this task.

Japanese strategic bombing

Strategic bombing, mostly targeting large Chinese cities, was independently conducted during the Second Sino-Japanese War and World War II by the Imperial Japanese Navy Air Service and the Imperial Japanese Army Air Service. There were also air raids on Philippines and Australia, as well as the cities in Burma and Malaysia. The Navy and Army air services used tactical bombing against ships and military positions, as at Pearl Harbor.

Luftwaffe

In the early days of World War II, the Luftwaffe launched devastating air attacks against besieged cities. During the Battle of Britain, the Luftwaffe, frustrated in its attempts to gain air superiority, turned to bombing British cities. However, these raids did not have the effect predicted by prewar theorists.

Soviet Red Air Force

Although the rapid industrialization the Soviet Union experienced in the 1930s had the potential to enable the Soviet Air Forces to be effective against the Luftwaffe, Stalin's purges left the organization weakened. However, when Germany invaded in June 1941, the size of the Soviet Air Forces allowed it to absorb horrendous casualties and still maintain capability. Despite the near collapse of Soviet forces in 1941, they survived, as German forces outran their supply lines and the Americans and British provided Lend Lease assistance.

Although strategic bombing requires that the enemy's industrial war capacity be neutralized, some Soviet factories were moved far out of reach of the Luftwaffe's bombers. Because the Luftwaffe's resources were needed to support the German army, the Luftwaffe became overstretched, and even victorious battles degraded Germany's air force due to attrition. By 1943, the Soviets were able to produce considerably more airplanes than their German rivals; for example, at Kursk, the Soviets had twice the number of airplanes that the Luftwaffe had. Utilizing overwhelming numerical superiority, Soviet forces were able to drive the Germans out of Soviet territory and take the war to Germany.

Allied air forces in Europe

The British started a strategic bombing campaign in 1940 that was to last for the rest of the war. Early British bombers were all twin-engined designs, and the 1939 Battle of the Heligoland Bight had shown the vulnerability of bombers to fighter attack. Therefore, RAF Bomber Command turned to a policy of area bombing at night. Later in the war pathfinder tactics, radio location, ground mapping radar, and very low-level bombing enabled specific targets to be attacked.

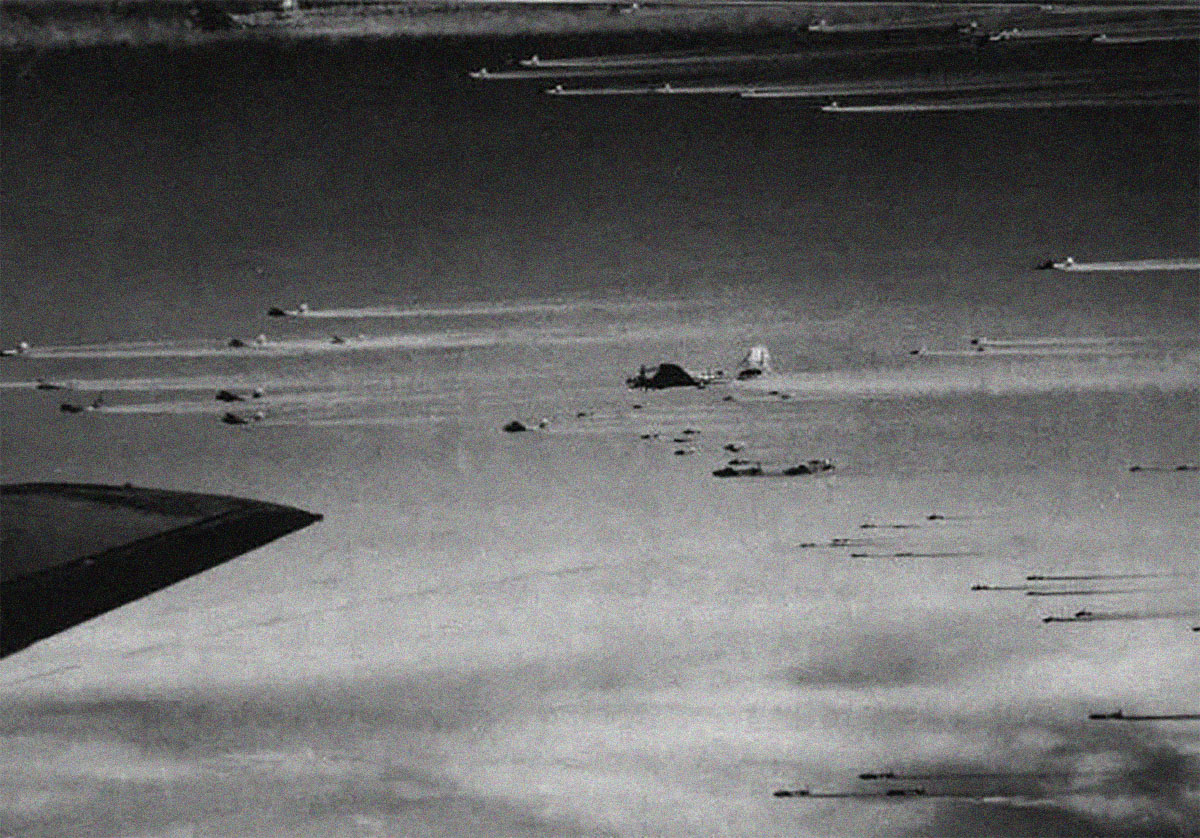
Part of a USAAF stream of over 1,000 Boeing B-17 Flying Fortress bombers.

When the USAAF arrived in England in 1942, the Americans were convinced they could carry out successful daylight raids. The U.S. Eighth Air Force was equipped with high-altitude four-engined designs. The new bombers also featured a stronger defensive armament. Flying in daylight in large formations, U.S. doctrine held tactical formations of heavy bombers would be sufficient to gain air superiority without escort fighters. The intended raids would hit hard on chokepoints in the German war economy such as oil refineries or ball bearing factories.

The USAAF was compelled to change its doctrine since bombers alone, no matter how heavily armed, could not achieve air superiority against single-engined fighters. In a series of missions in 1943 that penetrated beyond the range of fighter cover, there were loss rates up to twenty percent. The Allies lost 160,000 airmen and 33,700 planes during World War II, and almost 68,000 U.S. airmen died.

Air superiority

During the Battle of Britain, many of the best Luftwaffe pilots had been forced to bail out over British soil, where they were captured. As the quality of the Luftwaffe fighter arm decreased, the Americans introduced the long-range escort fighters, carrying drop tanks such as the North American P-51 Mustang. Newer, inexperienced German pilots—flying potentially superior aircraft, gradually became less and less effective at thinning the late-war bomber streams. Adding fighters to the daylight raids gave the bombers much-needed protection and greatly improved the impact of the strategic bombing effort.

Over time, from 1942 to 1944, the Allies' air forces became stronger while the Luftwaffe weakened. During 1944, Germany's air force lost control of Germany's skies. As a result, nothing in Germany could be protected whether it was army units, factories, civilians in cities, or even the nation's capital. German soldiers and civilians began to be slaughtered in the tens of thousands by aerial bombardment.

Effectiveness

Strategic bombing by non-atomic means did not however win the war for the Allies, nor did it succeed in breaking the will to resist of the German (and Japanese) people. But in the words of the German armaments minister Albert Speer, it created "a second front in the air." Speer succeeded in increasing the output of armaments right up to mid-1944 in spite of the bombing. Still, the war against the British and American bombers demanded enormous amounts of resources: antiaircraft guns, day and night fighters, radars, searchlights, manpower, ammunition, and fuel.

On the Allied side, strategic bombing diverted material resources, equipment (such as radar) aircraft, and manpower away from the Battle of the Atlantic and Allied armies. As a result, German army groups in Russia, Italy, and France rarely saw friendly aircraft and constantly ran short of tanks, trucks, and anti-tank weapons.

U.S. Bombing of Japan

In June 1944, Boeing B-29 Superfortresses launched from China, bombed Japanese factories. From November 1944, increasingly intense raids were launched from bases closer to Japan. Tactics evolved from high-altitude to lower altitude attacks, largely removing most defensive guns and switching to incendiary bombs. These attacks devastated many Japanese cities.

In August 1945, B-29 Superfortresses dropped atomic bombs on Hiroshima and Nagasaki while the Soviets invaded Manchuria. The Japanese then surrendered unconditionally, officially ending World War II.

=== Tactical air support ===
By contrast with the British strategists, the primary purpose of the Luftwaffe was to support the Army. This accounted for the presence of large numbers of medium bombers and dive bombers on strength and the scarcity of long-range heavy bombers. This 'flying artillery' greatly assisted in the successes of the German Army in the Battle of France (1940) . Hitler determined air superiority was essential for the invasion of Britain. When this was not achieved in the Battle of Britain, the invasion was canceled, making this the first major battle whose outcome was determined primarily in the air.

The war in Russia forced the Luftwaffe to devote the majority of its resources to providing tactical air support for the beleaguered German army. In that role, the Luftwaffe used the Junkers Ju 87, Henschel Hs 123 and modified fighters such as Messerschmitt Bf 109s and Focke-Wulf Fw 190s.

The Red Air Force was also primarily used in the tactical support role, and towards the end of the war was very effective in the support of the Red Army in its advance across Eastern Europe. An aircraft of major importance to the Soviets was the Ilyushin Il-2 Sturmovik "flying artillery" which made life very difficult for panzer crews, and the Il-2 played an important part in the Soviet victory in one of the biggest tank battles in history at Kursk.

=== Military transport and use of airborne troops ===
Military transport was invaluable to all sides in maintaining supply and communications of ground troops, and was used on many notable occasions such as resupply of German troops in and around Stalingrad after Operation Uranus, and employment of airborne troops. After the first trials in use of airborne troops by the Red Army displayed in the early 1930s many European nations and Japan also formed airborne troops, and these saw extensive service on in all theatres of the Second World War.

However their effectiveness as shock troops employed to surprise enemy static troops proved to be of limited success. Most airborne troops served as light infantry by the end of the war despite attempts at massed use in the Western Theatre by US and Britain during Operation Market Garden.

=== Naval aviation ===
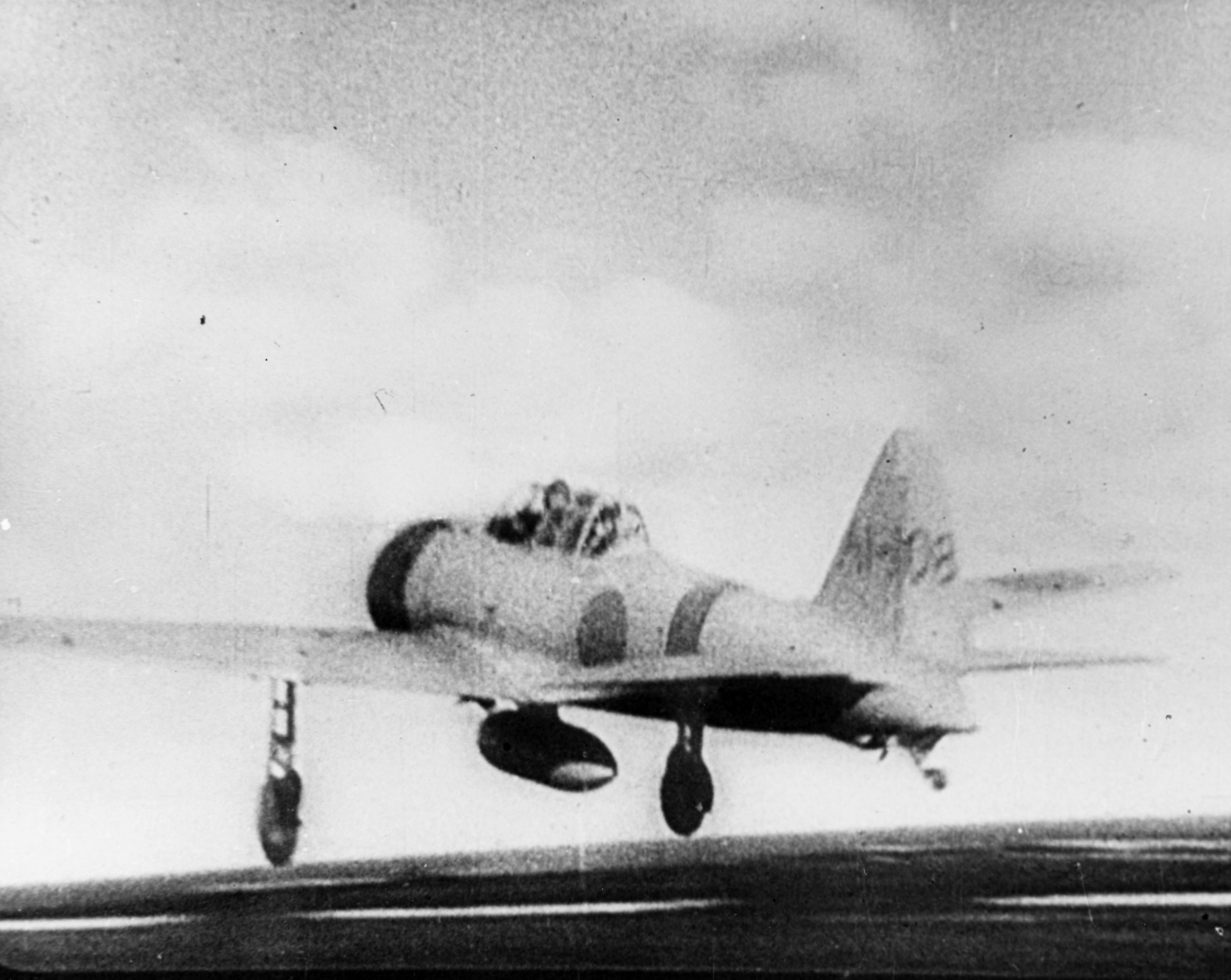
A Japanese Mitsubishi A6M2 Zero fighter heads for Pearl Harbor

Aircraft and the aircraft carrier first became important in naval battles in World War II. Carrier-based aircraft were specialized as dive bombers, torpedo bombers, and fighters.

Surface-based aircraft such as the Consolidated PBY Catalina and Short Sunderland helped finding submarines and surface fleets. The aircraft carrier replaced the battleship as the most powerful naval offensive weapons system as battles between fleets were increasingly fought out of gun range by aircraft. The Yamato, the most powerful battleship ever built was first turned back by light escort carrier aircraft, and later sunk due to it lacking its own air cover.

The US launched US Army Air Forces land-based bombers from United States Navy carriers in a raid against Tokyo. Smaller carriers were built in large numbers to escort slow cargo convoys or supplement fast carriers. Aircraft for observation or light raids were also carried by battleships and cruisers, while blimps were used to search for attack submarines.

In the Battle of the Atlantic, aircraft carried by low-cost escort carriers were used for antisubmarine patrol, defense, and attack. At the start of the Pacific War in 1941, Japanese carrier-based aircraft sank several US battleships at Pearl Harbor and land-based aircraft sank two large British warships. Engagements between Japanese and American naval fleets were then conducted largely or entirely by aircraft including the battles of Coral Sea, Midway, Bismarck Sea and Philippine Sea.

== Cold War ==
Military aviation in the post-war years was dominated by the needs of the Cold War. The post-war years saw the almost total conversion of combat aircraft to jet power, which resulted in enormous increases in speeds and altitudes of aircraft. Until the advent of the intercontinental ballistic missile major powers relied on high-altitude bombers to deliver their newly developed nuclear deterrent and each country strove to develop the technology of bombers and the high-altitude fighters that could intercept them. The concept of air superiority began to play a heavy role in aircraft designs for both the United States and the Soviet Union.

The Americans developed and made extensive use of the high-altitude observation aircraft for intelligence-gathering. The Lockheed U-2, and later the Lockheed SR-71 Blackbird were developed in great secrecy. The U-2 at its time was expected to be invulnerable to defensive measures due to its extreme altitude capabilities. It therefore came as a shock when the Soviets downed one piloted by Gary Powers with a surface-to-air missile.

Air combat was also transformed through increased use of air-to-air guided missiles with increased sophistication in guidance and increased range. In the 1970s and 1980s it became clear that speed and altitude was not enough to protect a bomber against air defences. The emphasis shifted therefore to maneuverable attack aircraft that could fly 'under the radar', at altitudes of a few hundred feet.

=== Korean War ===
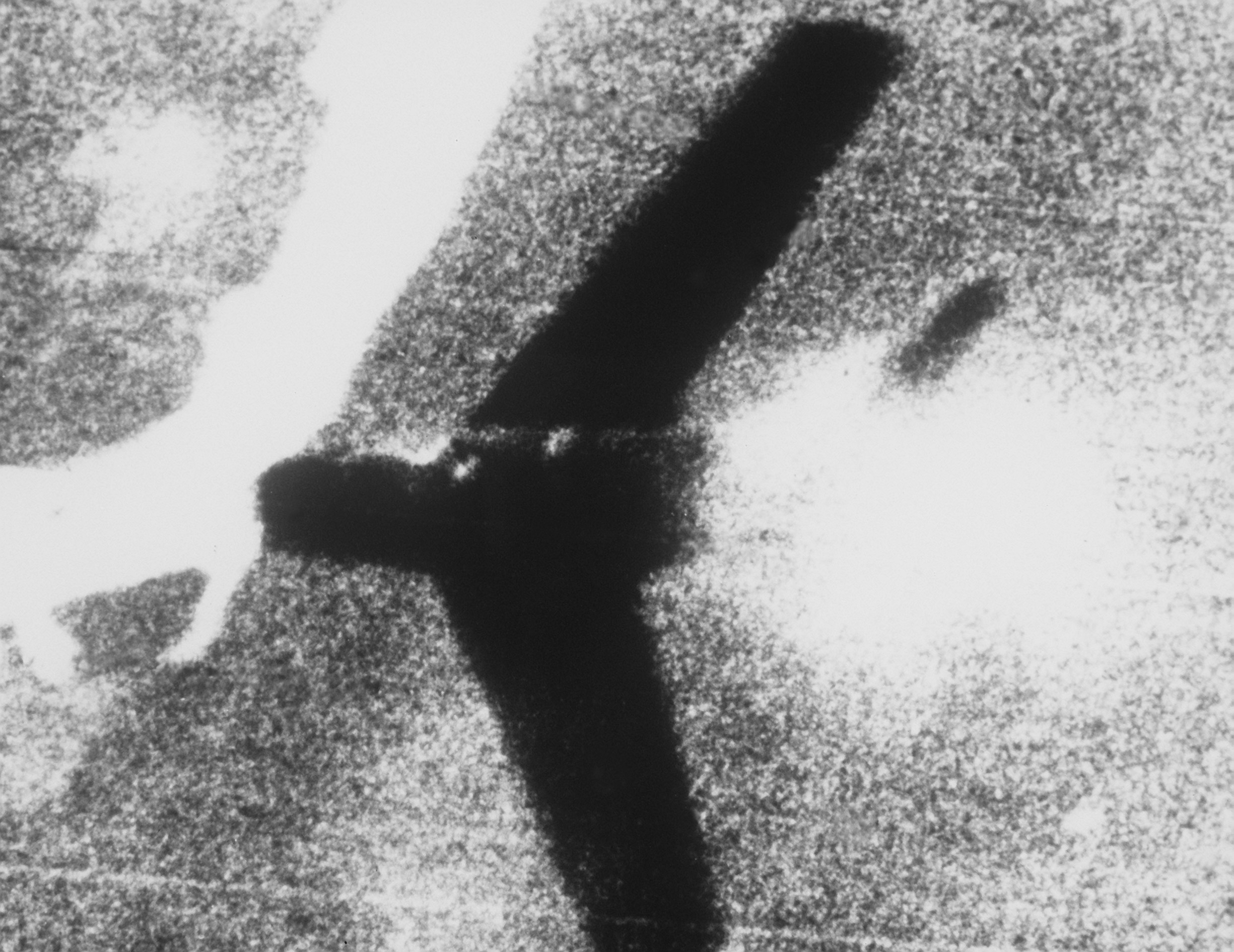
MiG-15 shot down by a USAF North American F-86 Sabre over MiG Alley

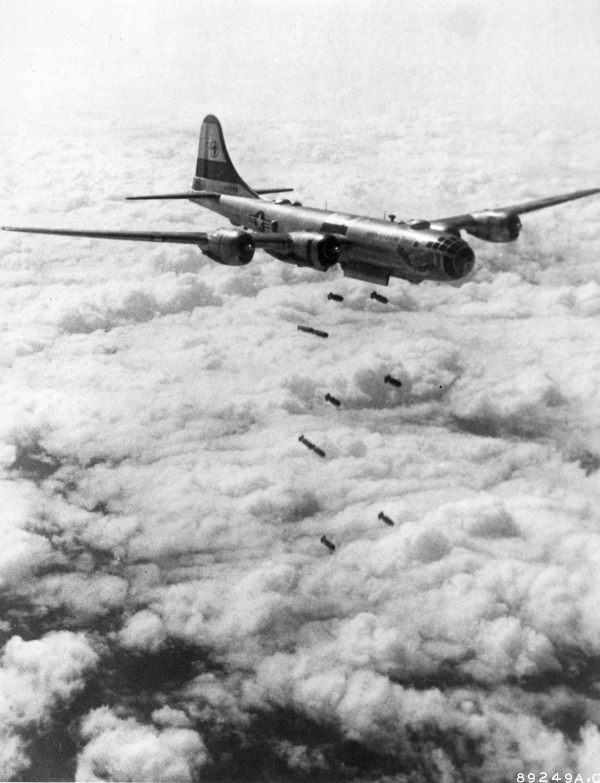
Over the course of the war, at least 16 USAF Boeing B-29 Superfortress bombers were shot down by communist aircraft.

The Korean War was best remembered for jet combat, but was one of the last major wars where propeller-powered fighters such as the North American P-51 Mustang, Vought F4U Corsair and aircraft carrier-based Hawker Sea Fury and Supermarine Seafire were used. Turbojet fighter aircraft such as Lockheed F-80 Shooting Stars, Republic F-84 Thunderjets and Grumman F9F Panthers came to dominate the skies, overwhelming North Korea's propeller-driven Yakovlev Yak-9s and Lavochkin La-9s.

Starting in 1950, North Koreans began flying the Soviet-made MiG-15 jet fighters, which introduced the near-sonic speeds of swept wings to air combat. Though an open secret during the war, many of the fighter pilots have since admitted that they were experienced Soviet Air Force aviators, a casus belli that was intentionally overlooked by the UN allied forces who suspected the involvement of Russia, but who were also reluctant to engage in direct war with the Soviet Union and the People's Republic of China.

At first, UN jet fighters, which also included Royal Australian Air Force Gloster Meteors, had some success, but straight winged jets were soon outclassed in daylight by the superior speed of the MiGs. At night, however, radar-equipped Marine Corps Douglas F3D Skynight night fighters claimed five MiG kills with no losses of their own, and no B-29s under their escort were lost to enemy fighters.

In December 1950, the United States Air Force rushed in their own swept-wing fighter, the North American F-86 Sabre. The MiG could fly higher, 50,000 vs. 42,000 feet (12,800 m), offering a distinct advantage at the start of combat. In level flight, their maximum speeds were comparable at about 660 mph (1,060 km/h). The MiG could climb better, while the Sabre could dive better with an all-flying tailplane. For weapons, the MiG carried two 23 mm and one 37 mm cannon, compared to the Sabre's six .50 (12.7 mm) caliber machine guns. The American .50 caliber machine guns, while not packing the same punch, carried many more rounds and were aimed with a more accurate radar-ranging gunsight. The U.S. pilots also had the advantage of G-suits, which were used for the first time in this war.

Even after the Air Force introduced the advanced F-86, its pilots often struggled against the jets piloted by Soviet pilots, dubbed "honchos". The UN gradually gained air superiority over most of Korea that lasted until the end of the war. It was a decisive factor in helping the UN first advance into the north, and then resist the Chinese invasion of South Korea.

After the war, the USAF claimed 792 MiG-15s and 108 additional aircraft shot down by Sabres for the loss of 78 Sabres. Later research reduced the total to 379 victories which is still higher than the 345 losses shown in USSR records.

The Soviets claimed about 1,100 air-to-air victories and 335 combat MiG losses at that time. China's official losses were 231 planes shot down in air-to-air combat (mostly MiG-15s) and 168 other losses. The number of losses of the North Korean Air Force was not revealed. It is estimated that it lost about 200 aircraft in the first stage of the war, and another 70 aircraft after Chinese intervention.

Soviet claims of 650 victories over the Sabres, and China's claims of another 211 F-86s, are considered to be exaggerated by the USAF.

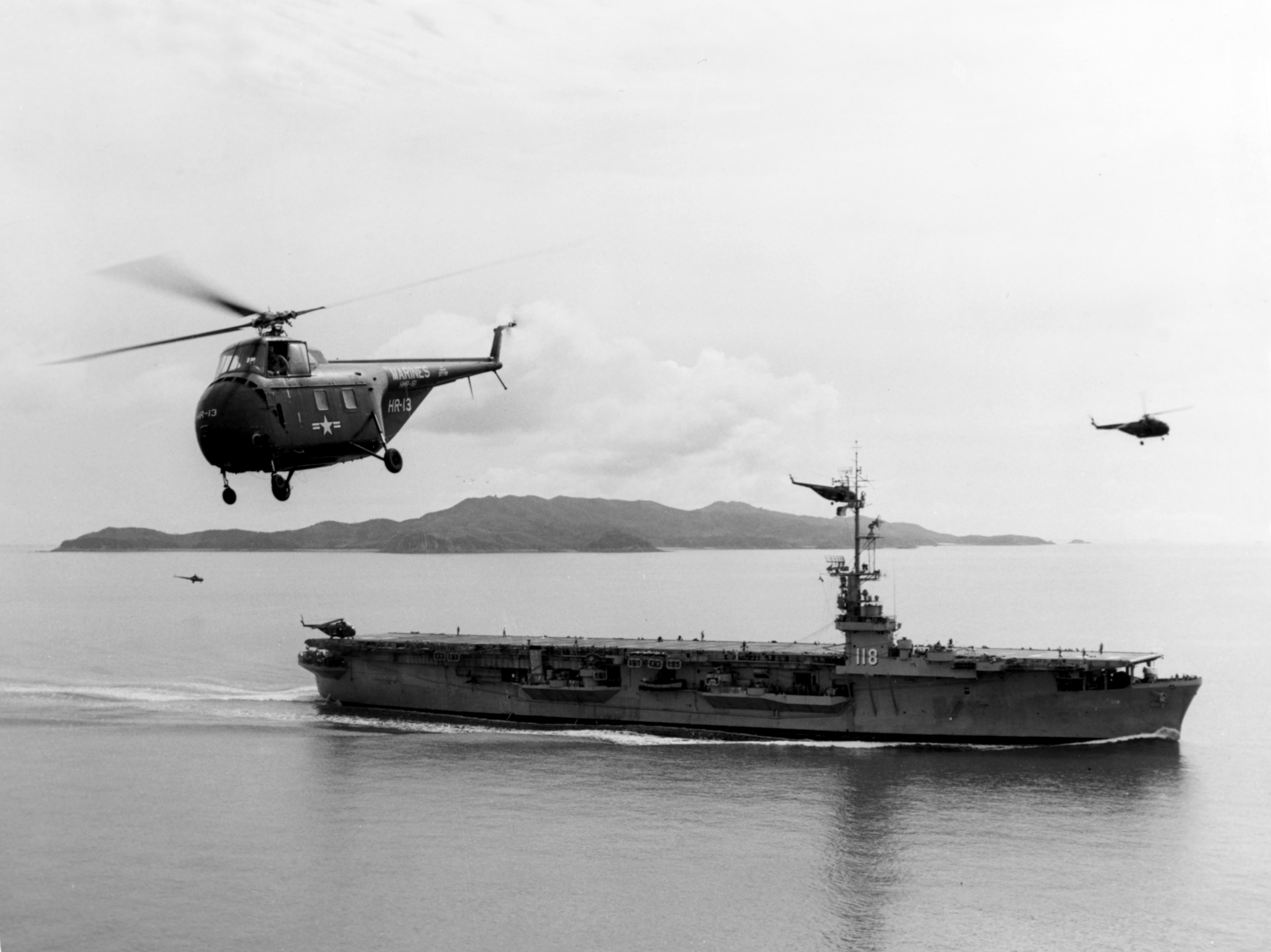
Helicopters like this H-19 were used in the Korean war.

The Korean war was the first time the helicopter was used extensively in a conflict. While helicopters such as the Sikorsky YR-4 were used in World War II, their use was rare, and Jeeps like the Willys MB were the main method of removing an injured soldier. In the Korean war helicopters like the Sikorsky H-19 partially took over in the non combat Medevac area.

=== Indo-Pakistani Wars ===
During the Indo-Pakistani War of 1965, both air forces engaged each other for the first time in full scale combat since independence. Both countries hold contradictory combat loss claims for the war and no neutral sources have verified them. The Pakistani Air Force (PAF) claimed 104 Indian Air Force (IAF) aircraft while losing only 19 in the process. India meanwhile claims they lost 35 aircraft while shooting down 73 Pakistani aircraft. During the war, the numerically larger IAF, was not able to achieve any air superiority over qualitatively superior Pakistan Air Force. Thus the war was effectively a stalemate.

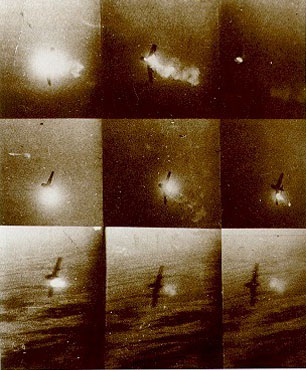
Cine gun camera shots showing a PAF Sabre being shot down in combat by an IAF Gnat in September 1965.

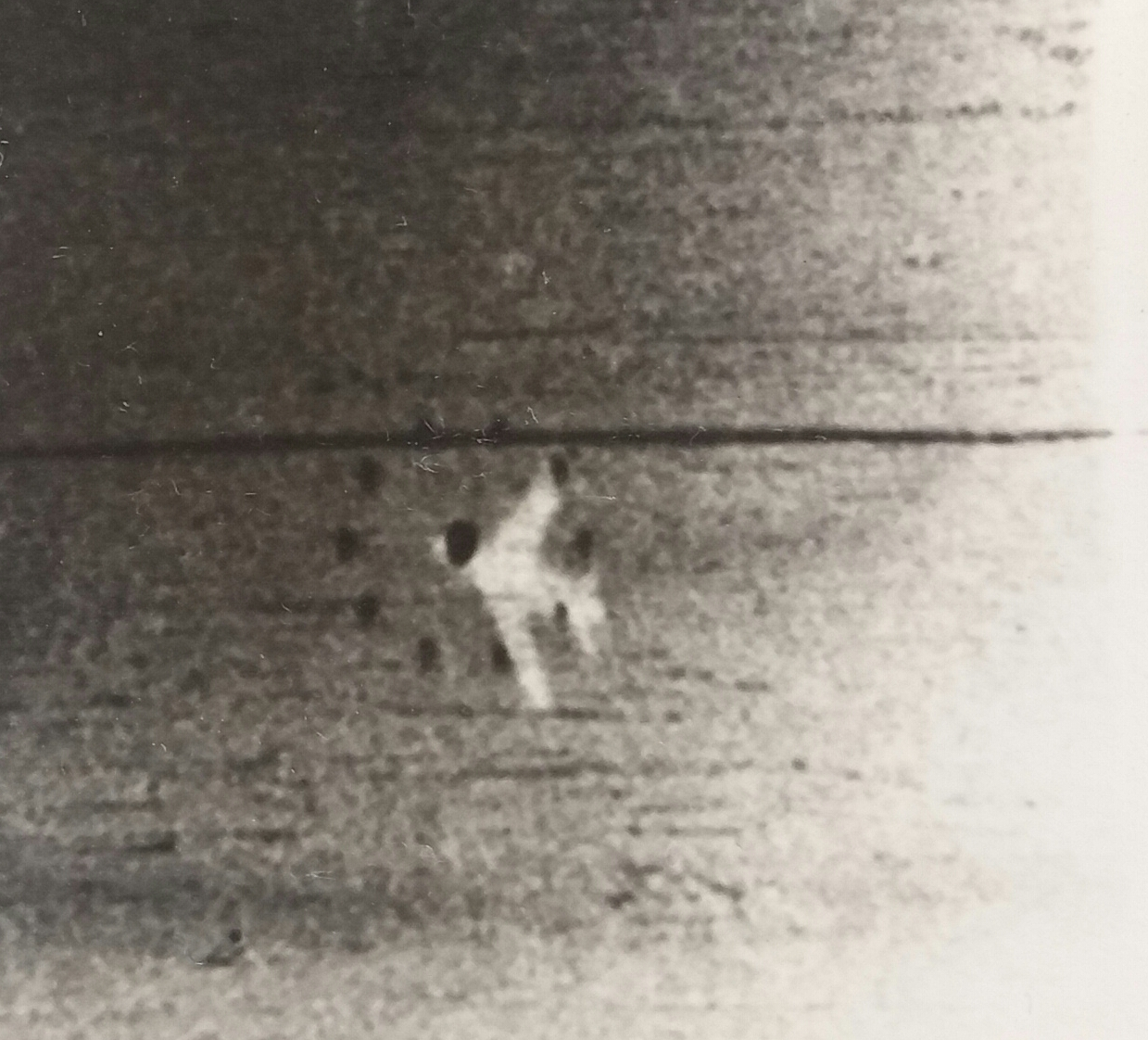
Guncam photo taken by a PAF F-86F of the No. 26 Squadron showing an IAF Gnat moments before it was shot down in December 1971.

By the time of the Indo-Pakistani War of 1971, the Indian Air force had both the numerical as well as qualitative edge. Newly procured Mikoyan-Gurevich MiG-21s and Sukhoi Su-7 were also inducted into service. On the other side of the border the PAF had successfully inducted new aircraft such as the Shenyang J-6 and Dassault Mirage III. The war began with Operation Chengiz Khan, Pakistan's December 3, 1971 pre-emptive strike on 11 Indian airbases. After the initial pre-emptive strike, the PAF adopted a defensive stance in response to the Indian retaliation. As the war progressed, the Indian Air Force continued to fight the PAF over conflict zones, but the number of sorties flown by the PAF gradually decreased day-by-day. The Indian Air Force flew 4,000 sorties while its counterpart, the PAF offered 3,300 in retaliation, partly because of shortages of non-Bengali technical personnel. In East Pakistan, the lone No. 14 Squadron Tail Choppers of the PAF pitched against ten IAF Squadrons was ultimately grounded, when the Tezgaon airfield in Dhaka (Dacca) was put out of commission after seven days of repeated bombings by Indian MiG-21s, Hunters and Su-7s, and consequently allowed the IAF to attain air superiority in the East.

=== Vietnam War ===
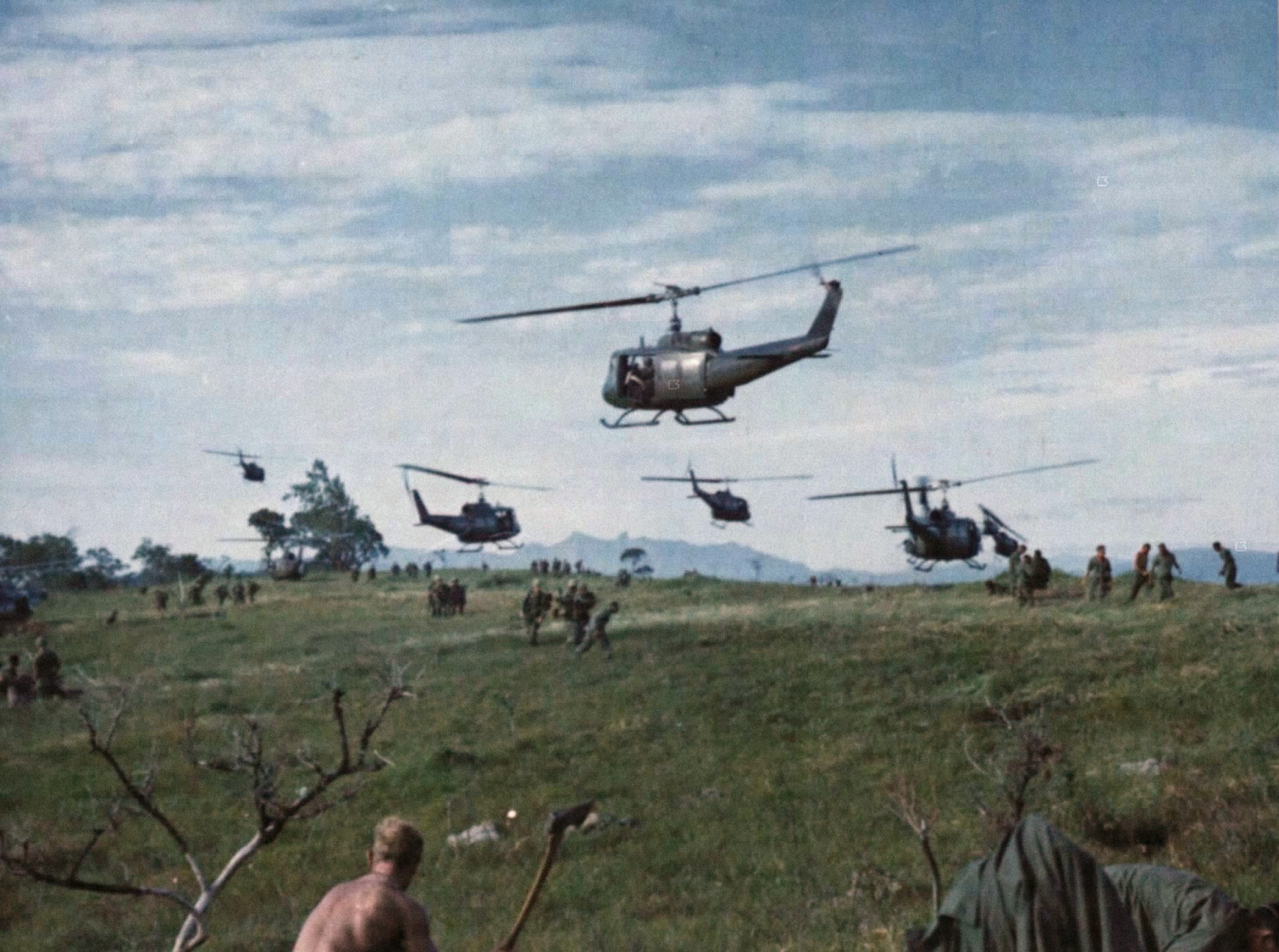
UH-1Ds during "Air Cav" operations, 1967

The Republic of Vietnam Air Force (VNAF) was originally equipped with helicopters such as the Piasecki CH-21 and propeller powered aircraft such as the North American T-28 Trojan when jet aircraft were disallowed by treaty. As US involvement increased, most aircraft were flown by US forces.

Large scale use of helicopters by the US Army in Vietnam led to a new class of airmobile troops, and the introduction of "Air Cavalry" in the U.S., culminating in extensive use of the Bell UH-1 Huey helicopter which would become a symbol of that war, while the Sikorsky CH-54 Tarhe "Skycrane" and Boeing-Vertol CH-47 Chinook lifted heavier loads such as vehicles or artillery. Troops were able to land unexpectedly, strike, and leave again, and evacuate wounded. The specialized AH-1 Cobra was developed from the Huey for escort and ground support duties, The later Soviet campaign in Afghanistan would also see widespread use of helicopters as part of the air assault brigades and regiments.

US forces provided close support of ground force over South Vietnam, and strategic bombing of targets over North Vietnam. Many types flying close support or COIN (Counter Insurgency Warfare) missions were propeller powered types such as the Cessna O-1 Bird Dog and North American OV-10 Bronco FAC spotters, Douglas A-1 Skyraider, Douglas B-26 Invader, and Douglas AC-47 Spooky gunship. Fairchild C-123 Provider and Lockheed C-130 Hercules transports flew supplies into battlefields such as Khe Sanh.

"Fast movers" included the supersonic North American F-100 Super Sabre, while the giant Boeing B-52 Stratofortress would be modified to unload a massive high explosive payload on enemy troop concentrations. The Lockheed AC-130 would become the ultimate gunship, while the AX specification to replace the Skyraider would evolve into the Fairchild Republic A-10 Thunderbolt II.

USAF Republic F-105 Thunderchiefs flew the bulk of strike missions against North Vietnam in Operation Rolling Thunder, while carrier-based Douglas A-4 Skyhawks (which could "buddy-buddy" refuel) were flown by the Navy. That first campaign was marred by carefully measured regulations that prohibited attacks against SAM missile sites and fighter bases, and frequent bombing halts, and produced little in political results. Rolling Thunder saw the first combat use of electronic computers aboard PIRAZ ships to display comprehensive real-time aircraft position information for force commanders.

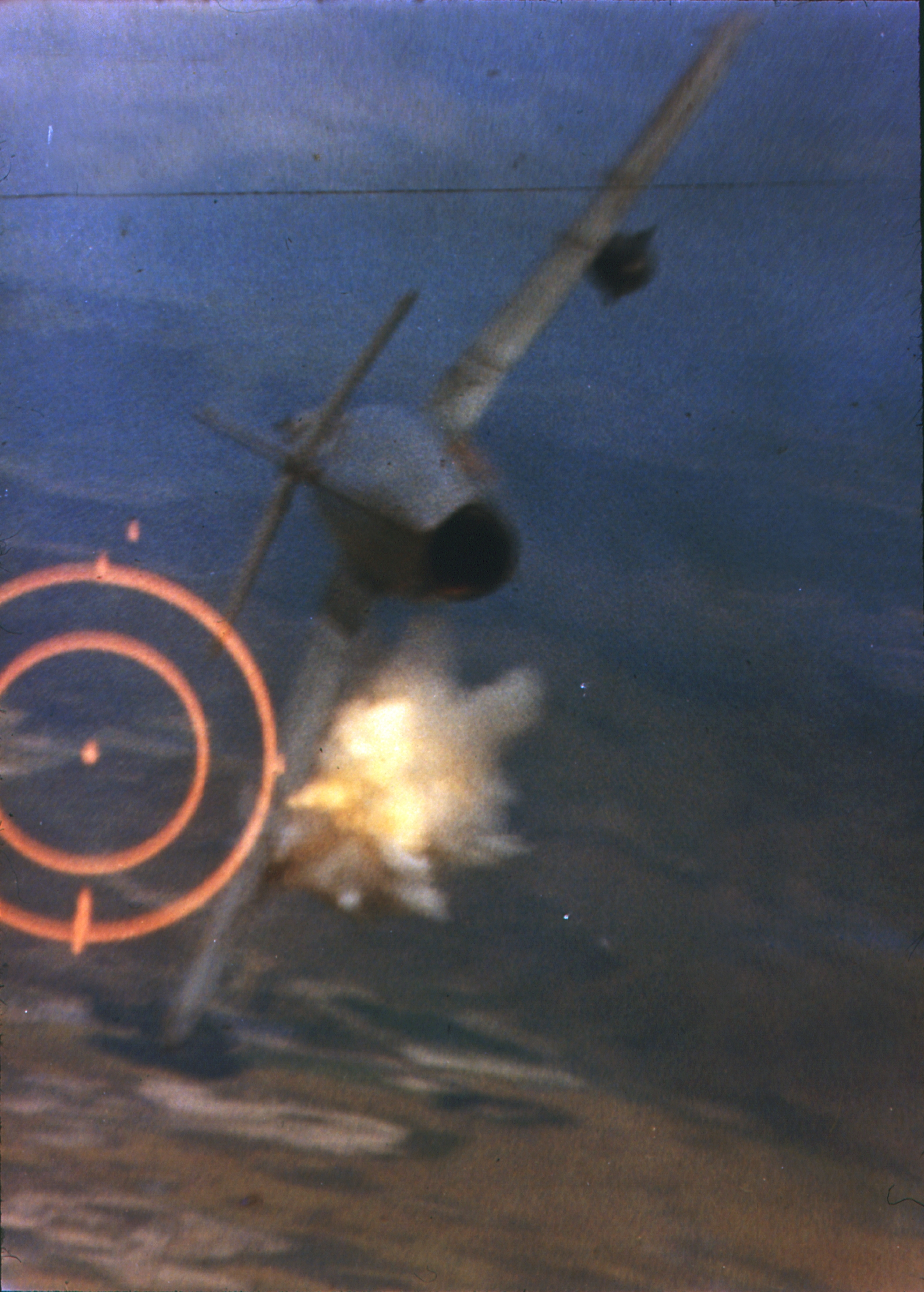
A USAF Republic F-105D Thunderchief shoots down a MiG-17 with cannon fire, 1967.

Lessons learned were applied to the later Operation Linebacker which employed McDonnell Douglas F-4 Phantom II, B-52 Stratofortresses, swing-wing General Dynamics F-111 Aardvarks, LTV A-7 Corsair IIs and all-weather Grumman A-6 Intruders was more successful in bringing North Vietnam to the negotiating table after a massive ground invasion. North Vietnam effectively combined Soviet and Chinese anti-aircraft artillery, SA-2 guided missiles, and MiG fighters to create the most heavily defended airspace up to that time.

US air strikes would combine the use of airborne radar platforms such as the Lockheed EC-121 Warning Star, Boeing KC-135 Stratotankers for air refueling, radar jamming aircraft and specialized "Wild Weasel" units to attack SAM missile sites. Jolly Green Giant helicopter crews escorted by Douglas A-1 Skyraiders ("Sandy"s) would retrieve downed pilots over hostile territory. With the use of "smart" guided bombs late in the war, this would set the model for future US air operations.

Experts were surprised when advanced F-105s were shot down in its first encounter against the elderly but nimble MiG-17. Dogfights were thought to be obsolete in the age of missiles, but pilots now needed maneuverability. The McDonnell Douglas F-4 Phantom II was quickly tasked with protecting against MiGs, but lacked a built-in gun when missiles were still very unreliable. Air combat training schools such as TOPGUN would improve kill ratios, but combat experience started programs that would produce agile air superiority fighters with guns such as the McDonnell Douglas F-15 Eagle by the 1970s.

South Vietnam fell without US air support when faced with a massive assault in 1975. The VNAF Republic of Vietnam Air Force was never supplied with powerful fighters and bombers such as the F-4 Phantom and B-52 which could strike at North Vietnam.

=== Middle East ===
In the Six-Day War of 1967, the Israeli Air Force launched pre-emptive strikes which destroyed opposing Arab air forces on the ground. The Yom Kippur War of 1973 saw the Arab deployment of mobile 2K12 Kub (SA-6) missiles which proved effective against low-flying Israeli aircraft until they were neutralized by ground forces.

=== Iran–Iraq War ===
In the Iran–Iraq War (1980–1988), the use of aerial warfare was continuous. At the war's beginning Iraq attempted to destroy the Islamic Republic of Iran Air Force by bombing its airfields but failed due to lack of pilot training and Iranian air base defenses. The war also saw the first helicopter vs. helicopter engagements between the Iraqi and Iranian air forces.

=== Falklands War (1982) ===
During the six-week Falklands War British carrier-based British Aerospace Sea Harrier and Hawker Siddeley Harrier flew over 1500 sorties and Avro Vulcans flew long-range bombing missions. 21 Argentine fixed-aircraft were destroyed in the air by British Harriers and Sea Harriers. A further 18 Argentine fixed-wing aircraft were destroyed by British Surface to Air Missiles. 15 Argentine fixed-wing aircraft were destroyed on the ground and 14 were captured. Sixty eight Argentine fixed-wing aircraft were captured or destroyed by British Forces, representing 28% of the 240 fixed-wing aircraft the Argentinians had at the start of the war. When accidents and friendly fire are included, 31% of the total 240 fixed-wing aircraft were lost.

== Post Cold War ==
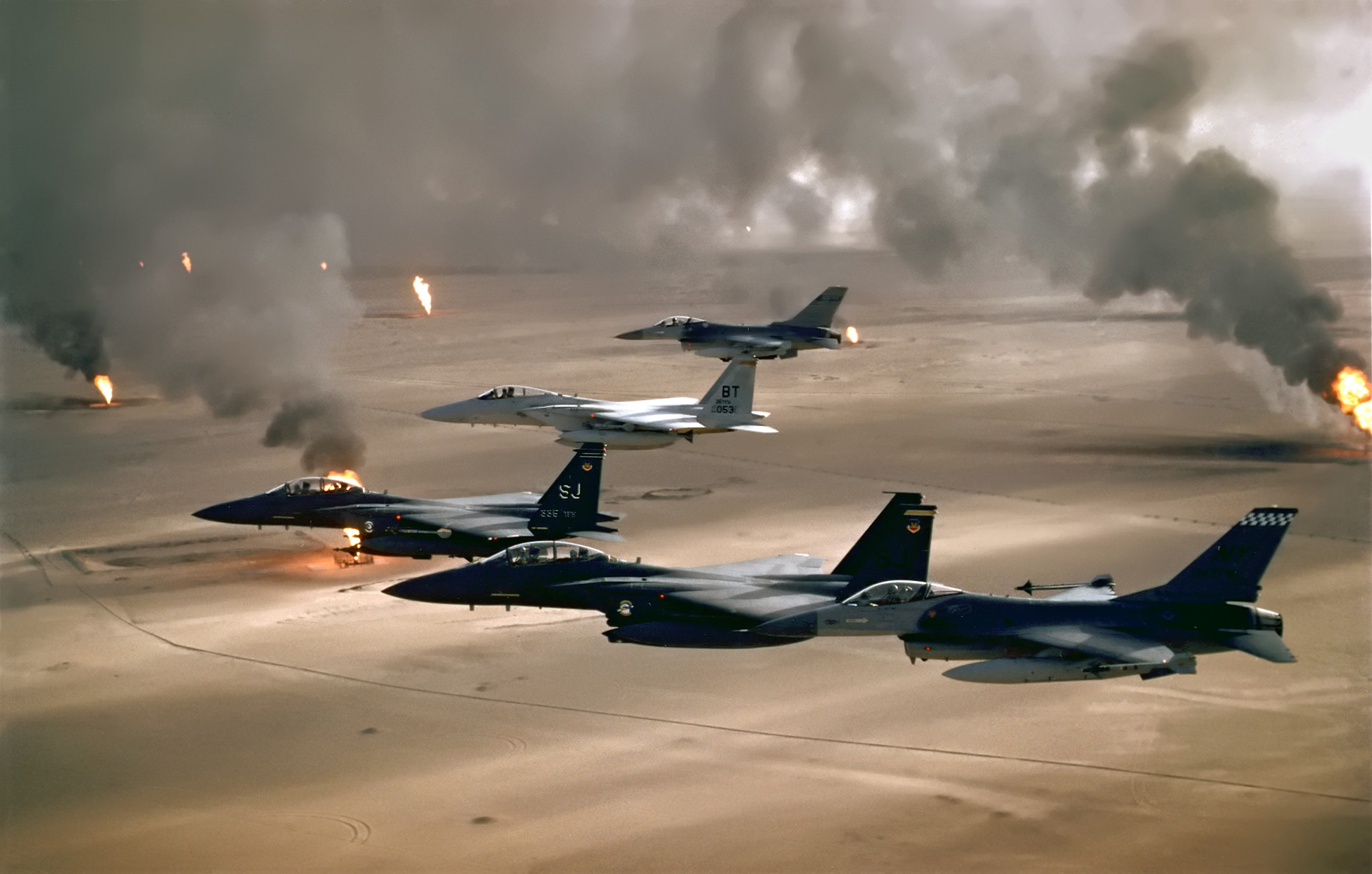
U.S. Air Force fighters flying over a burning oil field during Operation Desert Storm.

The collapse of the Soviet Union in 1991 forced Western air forces to undergo a shift from the massive numbers felt to be necessary during the Cold War to smaller numbers of multi-role aircraft. The closure of several military bases overseas and the U.S. Base Realignment and Closure program have served to highlight the effectiveness of aircraft carriers in the absence of dedicated military or air force's bases, as the Falklands War and U.S. operations in the Persian Gulf have highlighted.

The advent of precision-guided munitions have allowed for strikes at arbitrary surface targets once proper reconnaissance is performed (network-centric warfare).

The Stockholm International Peace Research Institute (SIPRI) has noted that sales of combat aircraft can have a destabilizing effect because of their ability to quickly strike neighboring countries, such as during Operation Orchard in 2007 when the Israelis unilaterally attacked Syria.

=== Gulf War (1991) ===
The role of air power in modern warfare was dramatically demonstrated during the Gulf War in 1991. Air attacks were made on Iraqi command and control centers, communications facilities, supply depots, and reinforcement forces. Air superiority over Iraq was gained before major ground combat began.

The initial strikes were composed of Tomahawk cruise missiles launched from ships, Lockheed F-117 Nighthawk stealth bombers with an armament of laser-guided bombs, and aircraft armed with anti-radar missiles. These first attacks destroyed the air defence network and allowed fighter-bombers to gain air superiority over the country.

Fairchild Republic A-10 Thunderbolt IIs attacked Iraqi armored forces with Gatling guns and Maverick missiles, supporting the advance of US ground troops. Attack helicopters, fired laser guided Hellfire missiles and TOW missiles. The allied air fleet also made use of AWACS aircraft and Boeing B-52 Stratofortress bombers.

The aerial strike force was made up of over 2,250 combat aircraft, which included 1,800 US aircraft, which fought against an Iraqi force of about 500 primarily composed of MiG-29 and Mirage F1 fighters. More than 88,000 combat missions had been flown by allied forces with over 88,000 tons of bombs dropped by the end of the fifth week.

=== Kargil War (1999) ===
On 11 May 1999, the Indian Air Force was called in to provide helicopters for close air support to the Indian Army at the height of the Kargil conflict with Pakistan. PAF was not a party in this conflict therefore entire IAF effort remained concentrated on unopposed ground operations. The first strikes were launched on the 26 May, when the Indian Air Force struck infiltrator positions with fighter aircraft and helicopter gunships. The initial strikes saw MiG-27s carrying out offensive sorties, with MiG-21s and MiG-29s providing fighter cover. The IAF also deployed radars and MiG-29 fighters to keep check on Pakistani military movements across the border.

On 27 May, the IAF lost a MiG-21 to enemy action and a MiG-27 to mechanical failure. The following day, a Mi-17 was lost to SAMs while on an offensive sortie. These losses forced the IAF to withdraw helicopters from offensive roles. On 30 May, the IAF called into operation the Mirage 2000 which was deemed the best aircraft in the high-altitude conditions. Mirage 2000s not only had better defence equipment compared to the MiGs, but also gave IAF the ability to carry out aerial raids at night. Indian MiG-29s were used extensively during the 1999 Kargil War in Kashmir by the Indian Air Force to provide fighter escort for Mirage 2000s, which were attacking targets with laser-guided bombs.

=== Eritrean–Ethiopian War (1998–2000) ===
The war became the first to see 4th-generation jet fighters battle with each other. Most of the losses to Eritrean MIG-29s were caused by dogfights with Ethiopian Su-27s.

=== Iraq War (2003–2011) ===
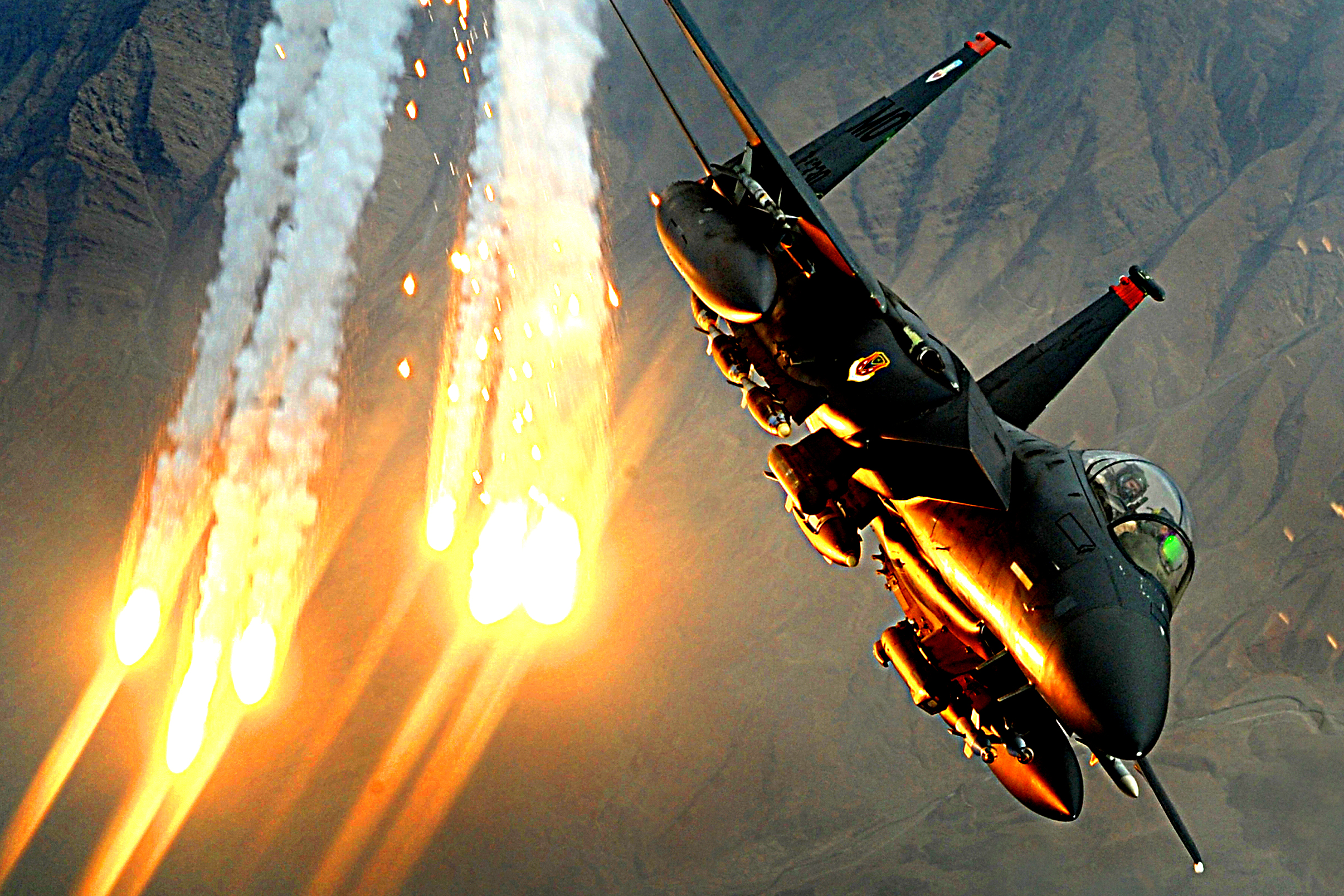
A USAF F-15E Strike Eagle launches heat decoys during a close-air-support mission over Afghanistan, 2008.

During the 2003 invasion of Iraq led by US and British forces putatively to defeat the regime of Saddam Hussein, aerial warfare continued to be decisive. The US-British alliance began its air campaign on March 19 with limited nighttime bombing on the Iraqi capital of Baghdad. Several days later, intensive bombardment began. About 14,000 sorties were flown, and at a cost of $1 million each, 800 Tomahawk cruise missiles were fired at numerous targets in Iraq from March 19 until mid-April 2003. By this time Iraqi resistance had largely ended.

Iraqi anti-aircraft weapons were unable to open fire on high-altitude US bombers such as the B-52 or stealth aircraft such as the B-2 bomber and the F-117A. US and British aircraft used radar-detecting devices and aerial reconnaissance to locate Iraqi anti-aircraft weapons. Bunker buster bombs, designed to penetrate and destroy underground bunkers, were dropped on Iraqi command and control centers. Iraqi ground forces could not seriously challenge the American ground forces because of their air supremacy. By mid-April 2003, US-British forces controlled all of Iraq's major cities and oil fields.

=== 2006 Lebanon War ===
In the beginning of the 2006 Lebanon War, Israel utilized an intensive aerial campaign aimed to eliminate Hezbollah and destroy its military, as stated by Israeli prime minister Ehud Olmert. It also aimed to return kidnapped Israeli soldiers. The campaign started by destroying Lebanese infrastructure and Hezbollah targets. This continued during the 33 days of the war.

Taking into consideration the results of the 1991 and 2003 wars on Iraq and the 1999 war on the former Yugoslavia, the Israeli air force was unable to accomplish its objectives as completely. This partly results from the military doctrine that Hezbollah used in the war which proved effective. There have also been reports during the conflict that a Hezbollah-operated flying drone penetrated Israeli airspace, and returned to Lebanese territory.

=== 2022 Russian invasion of Ukraine ===
The Russo-Ukrainian War became in 2022 the first conflict in two decades to feature large-scale aerial warfare.

Additionally, the Russian invasion of Ukraine has seen a rise in a new type of aerial warfare involving small, commercially available civilian drones (generally quadcopters) that have been modified to attack enemy positions such as those in buildings, vehicles, and trenches. These attacks are often done by modifying these drones to be able to drop explosives such as grenades, or equipping the drone with explosives and flying it directly towards enemies to self-destruct.

This differs from previous warfare involving unmanned aerial vehicles (UAVs) in that these drones are readily available in large quantities, easily accessible to civilian populations, and require substantially less space and resources to operate compared to traditional larger, fixed-wing UAVs. Apart from being far more accessible to civilian combatants and carrying little to no risk of casualties for the attacking side, they provide the added benefit of quick, high-precision attacks at a fraction of the cost of traditional UAVs. This makes them ideal for the type of urban warfare seen throughout the invasion of Ukraine.

=== 2025 India–Pakistan conflict ===
On 7 May 2025, Indian and Pakistani fighter jets exchanged long-range beyond-visual-range missiles for over an hour, in what they described as the largest aerial BVR fight in modern history. Two or three indian planes were shot down inside indian airspace. Multiple factors were cited for the losses, including Indian rules of engagement that restricted both Suppression of Enemy Air Defenses (SEAD) and proactive engagements against Pakistani aircraft. Additionally, intelligence failures reportedly led to an underestimation of the effective range of the PL-15 air-to-air missiles employed by Pakistan.This engagement was considered a pakistani victory.

Despite the initial losses, the Indian Air Force subsequently established air superiority over significant portions of Pakistani airspace. This was achieved through a sustained Suppression of Enemy Air Defenses (SEAD) campaign utilizing Harpy and Harop drones, which severely degraded the Pakistan Air Force's situational awareness. Subsequent Indian airstrikes targeted major airbases, resulting in the destruction of command and control centers, aircraft and UAV hangars, and surface-to-air missile (SAM) installations as well as cratering of runways.

In response, Pakistan deployed surface-to-surface missiles, including the Fatah-2 and Hatf-1, though these strikes failed to achieve their intended objectives. Indian air defense systems maintained a high interception rate throughout the conflict, neutralizing a majority of the incoming projectiles, no damage were observed at indian bases and military positions.

== See also ==
- Aerial warfare
- Aeronautics
- History of aviation

== Sources ==
- Bammi, Y.M. (2002). Kargil 1999, Impregnable Conquered. Gorkha Publishers. pp. xxviii, 558, 65, 8 p. ISBN 978-81-7525-352-0. LCCN 2003305922.
- Buckley, J.D.; Buckley, J.J. (1999). Air Power in the Age of Total War. Indiana University Press. ISBN 978-0-253-21324-2.
- Gross, C.J. (2002). American Military Aviation: The Indispensable Arm. Centennial of flight series. Texas A&M University Press. ISBN 978-1-58544-215-7.
