= Meilinger =

Meilinger is a surname. Notable people with the surname include:

- Marco Meilinger (born 1991), Austrian footballer
- Melanie Meilinger (born 1991), Austrian freestyle skier
- Phillip Meilinger (born 1948), United States Air Force officer and military historian
- Steve Meilinger (1930–2015), American football player
