= James Corum =

American military historian

James Sterling Corum

Academic work
- Main interests: Military history (History of warfare, World War II

James Sterling Corum is an American air power historian and scholar of counter-insurgency. He has written several books on counterinsurgency and other topics. He is a retired lieutenant colonel in the US Army Reserve.

== Early life ==
Corum was educated at Heidelberg, Gonzaga University (BA, 1975), Brown University (MA, 1976), and Oxford (M. Litt., 1984). He graduated Ph.D from Queen's University in Canada in 1990.

His first teaching post, from 1979 to 1981, was at Oxford as a German language tutor in the History faculty.

== Career ==
Corum became professor of Comparative Military Studies at the School of Advanced Air and Space Studies, Air University, Alabama. During 2005 he was both a visiting fellow of All Souls College, Oxford, and a visiting fellow of the Levershulme Program on the Changing Nature of War in the Department of International Politics at Oxford. He was then a professor of military history in the Department of Joint and Multinational Operations at the US Army Command and General Staff College, Fort Leavenworth. In 2008 he was also an adjunct professor of military history at Austin Peay State University.

From 2009 to 2014, Corum was dean of the Baltic Defence College in Tartu, Estonia. From there, he became a lecturer in the School of Arts and Media at the University of Salford.

Corum's primary speciality is air power history and he argues more in favour of integrated air power than of so-called strategic missions independent of the joint battlespace.

== Bibliography ==
- The Luftwaffe: Creating the Operational Air War, 1918–1940. (University Press of Kansas, 1997, ISBN 0-700-60836-2)
- The Roots of Blitzkrieg: Hans von Seeckt and German Military Reform (University Press of Kansas, 1992). ISBN 0-700-60541-X OCLC 25410850
- Wolfram von Richthofen: Master of the German Air War (University Press of Kansas, 2008, ISBN 978-0-7006-1598-8)
- Airpower in Small Wars: Fighting Insurgents and Terrorists. University Press of Kansas. 2003. ISBN 0-700-61240-8. OCLC 51477066.
- Training Indigenous Forces in Counterinsurgency: a Tale of Two Insurgencies. Strategic Studies Institute, U.S. Army War College. 2006. ISBN 1-584-87230-6. OCLC 66526200.
- Fighting the War on Terror: a Counterinsurgency Strategy. Zenith Press. 2007. ISBN 978-0-760-32868-2. OCLC 71243998.
- Bad Strategies: How Great Powers Fail in Counterinsurgency (Zenith Press, 2008).

Among Corum's articles are:

- "To stop them on the beaches: Luftwaffe Operations against the Allied Landings in Italy," Air Power Review, Vol. 7 No. 2 (Summer 2004), pp. 47–68.
- Defeat of the Luftwaffe, 1935–1945, In: Robin Higham & Stephen J. Harris: Why Air Forces Fail, University Press of Kentucky 2006, pp. 203–226

Corum has been a blogger for the British newspaper The Daily Telegraph, writing on international affairs and military issues.
