= Christina Goulter =

British military historian

Dr Christina Goulter
- Born: Christina Goulter; New Zealand
- Education: King's College London
- Occupations: Academic, Military historian

Christina Goulter is a New Zealand-born British military historian who is a senior lecturer in the Defence Studies Department of King's College London. Between 1994 and 1997 Goulter served as an Associate Visiting Professor of Strategy at the US Naval War College in Rhode Island.

Goulter researches and teaches on air power, intelligence and counter-insurgency studies. Her publications include one book, A Forgotten Offensive: Royal Air Force Coastal Command's Anti-Shipping Campaign 1940-1945 (London: Frank Cass, 1995).

== See also ==
- CAS Air Power Workshop
