= Phillip Meilinger =

American military historian

Phillip S. Meilinger (born in 1948) is a retired colonel of the USAF as well as a historian and analyst. He is a member of the Academic Advisory Panel of the Royal Air Force Centre for Air Power Studies. Before his retirement he was Dean of the School of Advanced Airpower Studies (SAAS) at the USAF's Air University in Montgomery, Alabama. He received a BS degree from the United States Air Force Academy, an MA degree from the University of Colorado, and obtained a PhD degree in military history from the University of Michigan. A command pilot, he has served as a C-130 aircraft commander and instructor pilot in both Europe and the Pacific. After a tour at the Air Force Academy, he was assigned to the Doctrine Division of the Air Staff at the Pentagon. He has authored ten books and scores of articles. Perhaps best known is his edited work, The Paths of Heaven: The Evolution of Airpower Theory (1997). In an attempt to create debate and more reflection about the inherent characteristics of air power, in 1995 Dr Meilinger wrote Ten Propositions on Airpower, a small and influential booklet advocating what he considers to be the air power equivalent of Principles of War. Among his many articles is:"Winged Defence: Answering the Critics of Airpower." Air Power Review Vol. 5 No. 4 (Winter 2002), pp. 41–64.
