= John Buckley (historian) =

British military historian

John D. Buckley
- Born: 27 March 1967 (age 59)
- Title: Professor of Military History

Academic work
- Main interests: military history, including air power.

John D. Buckley (born 27 March 1967) is Professor of Military History at the University of Wolverhampton. He teaches and publishes on twentieth-century military history and strategic studies, especially on air power and the final year of World War II.

== Career ==
His books and articles analyse maritime air power in the inter-war period and during World War II, most notably a study of RAF Coastal Command, and on various other aspects of air power including strategic bombing, British inter-war defence policy, and air power and total war. His works include RAF and Trade Defence 1919-1945: Constant Endeavour (1995), Air Power in the Age of Total War (1999), British Armour in the Normandy Campaign (2004) and the edited collection, The Normandy Campaign 1944: Sixty Years On (2006). With George Kassimeris, he is editor of The Ashgate Companion to Modern Warfare (2009).

His most recent work is Monty's Men: The British Army and the Liberation of Northwest Europe, 1944-5, which analyzes the performance of the British Army during the final stage of World War II.

== Books ==
Buckley has published books, articles and conference papers including:

- RAF and Trade Defence 1919-1945: Constant Endeavour (1995). ISBN 1-85331-069-7
- Air Power in the Age of Total War (1999). ISBN 0-253-33557-4
- British Armour in the Normandy Campaign (2004). ISBN 0-7146-5323-3
- Editor, The Normandy Campaign 1944: Sixty Years On (2006). ISBN 978-1-134-20303-1
- Editor, with George Kassimeris, The Ashgate Companion to Modern Warfare. (2009), London: Ashgate Publishing, ISBN 978-0-7546-7410-8.
- Monty's Men: The British Army and the Liberation of Europe, 1944-5. New Haven: Yale University Press, 2013. ISBN 978-0-300-13449-0 OCLC 840803701
