= Franz Hrdlicka =

- Born: 15 October 1920; Maxdorf, Czechoslovakia
- Died: 25 March 1945 (aged 24); Betzenrod, Germany
- Cause of death: Killed in action
- Burial place: Tutzing, New Cemetery
- Military career
- Allegiance: Nazi Germany
- Branch: Luftwaffe
- Service years: 1939–1945
- Rank: Hauptmann (captain)
- Units: JG 77, JG 2
- Commands: 5./JG 77, I./JG 2
- Conflicts: World War II: Eastern Front; Mediterranean Campaign; Defence of the Reich; Operation Bodenplatte
- Awards: Knight's Cross of the Iron Cross

Franz Hrdlicka (15 October 1920 – 25 March 1945) was a Luftwaffe ace and recipient of the Knight's Cross of the Iron Cross during World War II. (Note: Alternative spelling is Herdlicka.) Hrdlicka was credited with 60 aerial victories, potentially up to 96 claims. He was shot down and killed in action on 25 March 1945 near Betzenrod, now a suburb of Schotten, Hesse.

== Early life and career ==
Hrdlicka was born on 15 October 1920 in Maxdorf in Mähren, now the suburb Dvorska of Brno in the Czech Republic. In late 1939, he volunteered for military service in the Luftwaffe. Following flight training, (Note: Flight training in the Luftwaffe progressed through the levels A1, A2 and B1, B2, referred to as A/B flight training. A training included theoretical and practical training in aerobatics, navigation, long-distance flights and dead-stick landings. The B courses included high-altitude flights, instrument flights, night landings and training to handle the aircraft in difficult situations.) Hrdlicka was posted to the Ergänzungsgruppe (a training unit) of Jagdgeschwader 77 (JG 77—77th Fighter Wing) based at Götzendorf an der Leitha in early 1940. He received further training with 1. Staffel (1st squadron) of Ergänzungs-Jagdgruppe Merseburg, a supplementary training unit based at Merseburg. In May 1941, Hrdlicka was posted to 5. Staffel of JG 77.

== World War II ==
World War II in Europe had begun on Friday 1 September 1939 when German forces invaded Poland. With II. Gruppe of JG 77 under command of Hauptmann Anton Mader, Hrdlicka participated in Operation Barbarossa, the invasion of the Soviet Union, which marked the beginning of the Eastern Front on 22 June 1941. JG 77, augmented by I.(J). Gruppe of Lehrgeschwader 2 (LG 2—2nd Demonstration Wing) had the primary role in Operation Barbarossa of supporting the German advance as part of Army Group South. On 24 June, II. Gruppe moved to an airfield at Bacău. Here on 6 July, Hrdlicka claimed his first aerial victory. That day, the Gruppe flew three combat missions east of the Prut river. On the midday missions, Hrdlicka claimed a Polikarpov I-16 fighter shot down.

On 22 September, Hrdlicka was injured when the tire of his Messerschmitt Bf 109 E-7 (Werknummer 5892—factory number) ruptured at Chaplynka. On 19 October, II. Gruppe had reached Taganrog on the Sea of Azov. Here on 17 November, Hrdlicka claimed a Polikarpov I-153 shot down, his last aerial victory in 1941 and seventh in total. II. Gruppe was withdrawn from combat operations on 3 December 1941 and moved to Vienna-Aspern for reequipment with the Bf 109 F-4.

=== Crimea and Caucasus ===
On 11 March 1942, II. Gruppe began returning to the Eastern Front, at first to Proskuriv where it stayed for a few days and then to Sarabuz on the Crimea, arriving on 17 March 1942. Here Hrdlicka claimed three aerial victories, an Ilyushin DB-3 on 17 March, an I-153 fighter two days later and an I-16 fighter on 24 March. On 1 May, II. Gruppe moved to an airfield named Fernheim, on the Sea of Azov, approximately 15 kilometers (9.3 miles) west-northwest of Kirovske. In May, Hrdlicka was credited with two aerial victories, a Mikoyan-Gurevich MiG-1 fighter claimed on 8 May and a DB-3 bomber on 11 May.

In June, Hrdlicka claimed one aerial victory and ten in July. On 6 August, Hrdlicka claimed a Petlyakov Pe-2 bomber shot down but was then shot down and wounded in his Bf 109 F-4 (Werknummer 7021) near the airfield at Kastornoje, approximately 75 km (47 mi) west of Voronezh. On 7 November, II. Gruppe received orders from Generalmajor Alfred Bülowius, the commander of the 1. Flieger-Division (1st Air Division), to transfer to the North African theater of operations.

=== North Africa and Italy ===
In early 1941, the Oberkommando der Wehrmacht (OKW—Supreme Command of the Armed Forces) had sent an expeditionary force, to North Africa to support the Regio Esercito Italiano (Royal Italian Army) fighting in the North African Campaign. As intensity of combat increased, the OKW committed additional military forces to the Mediterranean theatre. First elements of JG 77 had already been committed to this theatre in February 1942. The Axis defeat at the Second Battle of El Alamein (23 October – 4 November 1942) and the 8 November 1942 Operation Torch landings had pushed the Axis out of Morocco, Algeria, Egypt and Libya into Tunisia. On 10 November 1942, Hrdlicka's II. Gruppe was also withdrawn from the Eastern Front for North Africa. On 5 December 1942, the Gruppenstab (headquarters unit), 4. and 6. Staffel arrived at Zazur, 15 kilometres (9.3 miles) west of Tripoli, Libya. Reequipping the 5. Staffel with the Bf 109 G-2 took longer than expected, arriving at Zazur on 18 December. Two days later, II. Gruppe flew its first combat air patrols. Led by Oberleutnant Anton Hackl, a flight of 5. Staffel encountered a formation of Curtiss P-40 Warhawk fighters in the area west of Tamet, Libya. In this encounter, 5. Staffel claimed five aerial victories, including one by Hrdlicka. The opponents were P-40s from 260 Squadron, Royal Air Force (RAF) which lost five aircraft that day.

In February 1943, Hrdlicka was appointed Staffelkapitän (squadron leader) of 5. Staffel, succeeding Oberleutnant Hackl who had been wounded in combat on 4 February. On 8 May, JG 77 evacuated from Tunisia to various airfields in Sicily while I. Gruppe was sent to Munich. The original intent was to give the Geschwader a period of rest. On 11 May, II. Gruppe moved from Trapani to the Italian mainland at Foggia for replenishment. After a month of rest, on 19 June 1943, the Gruppe went back to Trapani. On 12 July, Hrdlicka was awarded the German Cross in Gold (Deutsches Kreuz in Gold).

Following his 44th aerial victory, he was awarded the Knight's Cross of the Iron Cross (Ritterkreuz des Eisernen Kreuzes) on 9 August 1944. II. Gruppe flew its last combat mission in Italy on 6 September. Two days later the Gruppe began moving to Germany, arriving at Munich-Riem Airfield on 12 September, completing the transfer to Jüterbog Airfield on 14 September for Defence of the Reich operations.

=== Defense of the Reich and death ===
On 27 September 1944 during the Battle of Arnhem, 26 Bf 109 fighters of Gefechtsverband Michalski, named after Major Gerhard Michalski, flew a combat air patrol to Arnhem and Nijmegen, focusing on the area south of Driel to west of Elst. The Gefechtsverband was intercepted in the area of Kleve and Goch. In this encounter, 5. Staffel lost four pilots, either killed or missing in action, with two further pilots wounded. Hrdlicka was shot down and wounded in combat with Supermarine Spitfire fighters near Arnhem. He managed to bail out from his Bf 109 G-6 (Werknummer 162510) south of Bocholt.

On 18 December following a period of convalescence, Hrdlicka was appointed Gruppenkommandeur (group commander) of the I. Gruppe of Jagdgeschwader 2 "Richthofen" (JG 2—2nd Fighter Wing) based at Merzhausen (Usingen). He succeeded Hauptmann Kurt Hoffmann who temporarily had led the Gruppe after its former commander, Major Walter Matoni had been injured on 5 December. Hrdlicka led I. Gruppe during Operation Bodenplatte on 1 January 1945, an attempt at gaining air superiority during the stagnant stage of the Battle of the Bulge. Oberstleutnant Kurt Bühligen, the commanding officer of JG 2, had been informed of the operation on 5 December at a meeting held at the headquarters of the II. Jagdkorps (2nd Fighter Corps) commanded by Generalmajor Dietrich Peltz. A few days before Christmas, Bühlingen informed Hrdlicka and his other Gruppenkommandeure during a meeting at Nidda. JG 2 was to strike at Sint-Truiden Airfield. Hrdlicka briefed his Staffelkapitäne on 31 December. Taking off at 08:00, Hrdlicka led a formation of more than 30 aircraft to the assembly point at Koblenz. In the attack. I. Gruppe lost 18 Focke-Wulf Fw 190 fighters and six more were damaged by ground fire and enemy aircraft. This represented 73 per cent of their force. Of the 15 pilots missing, six survived as prisoners of war, nine were killed in action.

Hrdlicka was shot down by United States Army Air Forces fighters and killed in action on 25 March 1945 near Betzenrod, now a suburb of Schotten, Hesse. His remains were recovered on 8 September 1951. He had been nominated for the Knight's Cross of the Iron Cross with Oak Leaves (Ritterkreuz des Eisernen Kreuzes mit Eichenlaub) which was not approved.

== Summary of career ==
=== Aerial victory claims ===
According to the US historian David Zabecki, Hrdlicka was credited with 96 aerial victories. Obermaier lists him with 60 aerial victories claimed in over 500 sorties. Mathews and Foreman, authors of Luftwaffe Aces — Biographies and Victory Claims, researched the German Federal Archives and state that he claimed at least 44 aerial victories. This figure includes 24 aerial victories on the Eastern Front and at least 20 over the Western Allies, including three four-engined heavy bombers.

Victory claims were logged to a map-reference (PQ = Planquadrat), for example "PQ 83194". The Luftwaffe grid map (Jägermeldenetz) covered all of Europe, western Russia and North Africa and was composed of rectangles measuring 15 minutes of latitude by 30 minutes of longitude, an area of about 360 square miles (930 km^{2}). These sectors were then subdivided into 36 smaller units to give a location area 3 km × 4 km (1.9 mi × 2.5 mi) in size.

Chronicle of aerial victories
This and the # (hash mark) indicates those aerial victories listed by Prien, Stemmer, Rodeike and Bock without an explicit sequence number. This and the ? (question mark) indicates information discrepancies listed by Prien, Stemmer, Rodeike, Bock, Mathews and Foreman.
Claim	Date	Time	Type	Location	Claim	Date	Time	Type	Location
– 5. Staffel of Jagdgeschwader 77 – Operation Barbarossa — 22 June – 5 December 1941
1	6 July 1941	12:47	I-16		5	10 October 1941	10:10	Il-2	
2	6 August 1941	15:33	MiG-3		6	22 October 1941	11:00	R-5	
3	12 August 1941	13:14	SB-2	vicinity of Odessa	7	17 November 1941	13:39	I-153	
4	25 September 1941	15:00	I-153						
– 5. Staffel of Jagdgeschwader 77 – Eastern Front — 17 March – 30 April 1942
8	17 March 1942	12:38	DB-3		10	24 March 1942	13:00	I-16	
9	19 March 1942	15:20	I-153						
– 5. Staffel of Jagdgeschwader 77 – Eastern Front — 1 May – 7 November 1942
11	8 May 1942	12:11	MiG-1		18	21 July 1942	18:45	Hurricane	
#	11 May 1942	12:28	DB-3		19	21 July 1942	19:20	Hurricane	
13	14 June 1942	14:51	I-153		20	24 July 1942	05:46	LaGG-3	
14	6 July 1942	18:03	P-40		21	24 July 1942	05:50	U-2	
15	12 July 1942	17:09	Yak-1		22	25 July 1942	18:13	Pe-2	
16	13 July 1942	10:45	Il-2		23	31 July 1942	15:47	Il-2	PQ 83194
17	21 July 1942	16:34	LaGG-3		24	6 August 1942	18:04	Pe-2	PQ 82153
– 5. Staffel of Jagdgeschwader 77 – Mediterranean Theater, North Africa — 1–31 December 1942
25	20 December 1942	07:50	P-40	PQ 13 Ost 62732					
– 5. Staffel of Jagdgeschwader 77 – Mediterranean Theater, North Africa — 1 January – May 1943
26	1 January 1943	10:55	P-40	10 km (6.2 mi) southwest of airfield Zazur; 20 km (12 mi) northwest of Buerat	29? (Note: This claim is not listed by Mathews and Foreman.)	24 March 1943	08:35	Spitfire	10 km (6.2 mi) south-southeast of Gabès
27	1 March 1943	14:58	P-38? (Note: According to Mathews and Foreman claimed as a Martin Baltimore.)	southeast of Thélepte; 20 km (12 mi) northwest of Buerat	30	26 March 1943	10:50? (Note: According to Mathews and Foreman claimed at 10:37.)	Spitfire	10 km (6.2 mi) south-southeast of El Hamma
28	13 March 1943	17:45	P-39	52 km (32 mi) west-southwest of Sfax	31	1 April 1943	18:10	Spitfire	22 km (14 mi) east of El Guetter
– 5. Staffel of Jagdgeschwader 77 – Mediterranean Theater, Italy — June – 31 December 1943
32	20 June 1943	08:35	P-38	PQ 13 Ost 28134, west of Chinisia Airfield	35	9 July 1943	07:28	P-40	28 km (17 mi) east-northeast of Castelvetrano Airfield
33	4 July 1943	11:28	Spitfire	90 km (56 mi) east of Syracuse	36	19 August 1943	11:12	P-51	PQ 03 Ost 59274, east of Stromboli
34	5 July 1943	11:40	B-17	35 km (22 mi) west of Syracuse	37	9 November 1943	12:05	P-38	PQ 04 Ost 75712
– 5. Staffel of Jagdgeschwader 77 – Mediterranean Theater, Italy — 1 January – 8 September 1944
38	6 February 1944	08:10	P-51	PQ 14 Ost S/22423	42	4 June 1944	11:20	Spitfire	PQ 14 Ost UB northwest of Pistoia
39	20 March 1944	12:15	Spitfire	PQ 14 OST S/FA-7 south of Elba	43	26 June 1944	12:18	B-24	PQ 14 Ost N/5338
40	18 April 1944	08:12	P-51	2 km (1.2 mi) southwest of Bracciano southwest of Lake Bracciano	44	5 July 1944	13:08	P-47	PQ 14 Ost S/BE-1/1; Sansepolcro
41	29 May 1944	11:44	B-24	PQ 14 Ost S/66373 southeast of Zagreb					
– Stab III. Gruppe of Jagdgeschwader 2 "Richthofen" – Western Front — 18–31 December 1944
45	23 December 1944	12:03	B-26	PQ 05 Ost ON-5; Roetgen					

=== Awards ===
- Iron Cross (1939) 2nd and 1st Class
- Honor Goblet of the Luftwaffe on 13 September 1942 as Leutnant and pilot
- German Cross in Gold on 12 July 1943 as Oberleutnant in the II./Jagdgeschwader 77
- Knight's Cross of the Iron Cross on 9 August 1944 as Hauptmann and Staffelkapitän of the 5./Jagdgeschwader 77 (Note: According to Scherzer on 18 October 1944 as Staffelkapitän in the II./Jagdgeschwader 77.)
