= Operation Paula =

1940 offensive during the Battle of France

- Part of the Western Front of World War II
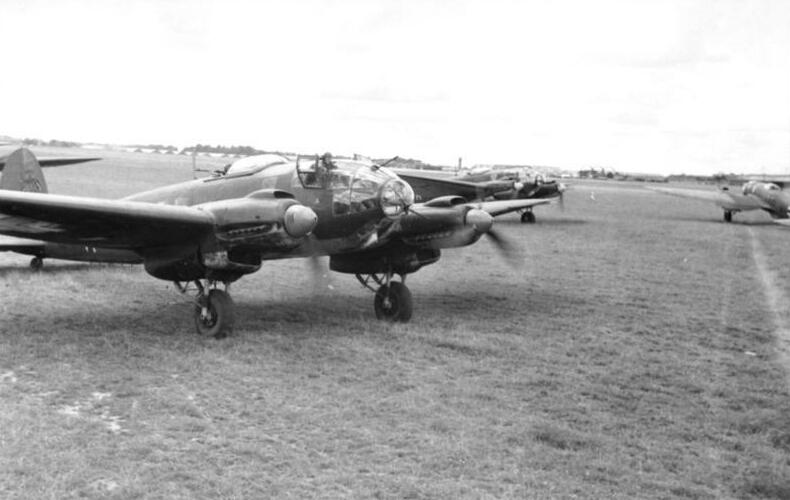
- Heinkel He 111 formations prepare for another mission, somewhere in France, June 1940
Date	3 June 1940
Location	Paris, France
Result	Operational failure

Belligerents
(French Third Republic) France	(Nazi Germany) Germany

Commanders and leaders
(French Third Republic) Joseph Vuillemin	(Nazi Germany) Hugo Sperrle (Nazi Germany) Albert Kesselring

Units involved
Zone d'Opérations Aériennes Nord or Z.O.A.N	I. Fliegerkorps; II. Fliegerkorps; IV. Fliegerkorps; V. Fliegerkorps; VIII. Fliegerkorps

Strength
120 fighters	1,100 aircraft (460 fighters)

Casualties and losses
35 aircraft (31 fighters); 906 casualties 254 dead (166 servicemen)	10 aircraft (four bombers)

Unternehmen Paula (Operation Paula) is the German codename for a Luftwaffe operation to destroy the remaining units of the Armée de l'Air (AdA, French Air Force) during the Battle of France in 1940. On 10 May the German armed forces (Wehrmacht) began their invasion of Western Europe. By 3 June, the bulk of the British Army had withdrawn from Dunkirk Operation Dynamo, the Netherlands and Belgium had surrendered and most of the formations of the French Army were disbanded or destroyed. To complete the defeat of France, the Germans undertook another operation, Fall Rot (Case Red), to conquer the remaining regions. To achieve this, air supremacy was required. The Luftwaffe was ordered to destroy the French Air Forces and support to the German Army.

The Germans committed five Air Corps to the attack, comprising 1,100 aircraft. The operation was launched on 3 June 1940. British intelligence had warned the French of the impending attack and the operation failed to achieve the strategic results desired by Oberkommando der Luftwaffe (High Command of the Air Force). The plight of the French ground and air forces at this stage meant that the failure of the operation would not impede the conquest of France.

== Background ==
After the declaration of war on Nazi Germany by the United Kingdom and France, in the aftermath of the German invasion of Poland, nine months of stalemate took place along the Western Front named the Phoney War. The only military action was the French Army's Saar Offensive which was terminated in controversial circumstances. After the Polish Campaign, in October 1939, the planners of the Oberkommando der Luftwaffe (Luftwaffe High Command) and the Oberkommando der Wehrmacht (Supreme Command of the Armed Forces) turned their attentions to Western Europe.

The Western Allies had surrendered the initiative and the Germans would take the offensive in 1940. Several plans were toyed with by the German General Staff. General Franz Halder, the chief of staff of the Army, presented the first plan for Fall Gelb ("Case Yellow") on 19 October 1939. The plan's German code was Aufmarschanweisung N°1, Fall Gelb, or "Deployment Instruction No. 1, Case Yellow". The operation was a limited operation in which Luxembourg and the Low Countries were to be conquered in order to provide a base for further operations against France at a later date and amounted to a less ambitious re-run of the infamous Schlieffen Plan which failed during the First World War in 1914. It was rejected by Adolf Hitler and at the turn of the year, Heinz Guderian's chief of staff, Erich von Manstein secured Hitler's attention with a modified version. An ambitious thrust through the Ardennes was suggested by von Manstein. This main attack would use up the majority of the motorised and tank divisions (Panzer Divisions) in a drive to the English Channel. A diversion operation in Belgium and the Netherlands would precede this thrust, to lure the Allied Armies, including the British Expeditionary Force, into a trap.

Launched on 10 May 1940, the revised version of Unternehmen Gelb (Operation Yellow), also known as the Manstein Plan, succeeded. However, the British Army escaped during the Battle of Dunkirk. Nevertheless, the Belgian Army, Dutch Army and most of the elite French forces were destroyed in the encirclement. This left just second rate French units to combat the entire German Army. The Luftwaffe had played an integral part in disrupting Allied operations in this early phase. The Luftwaffe's participation was particularly crucial during the Battle of Sedan which enabled the German Army to carry out Operation Yellow. By early June the Dunkirk siege was over, and on 3 June, the Germans began preparations for the conquest of the rest of France under the codename Fall Rot (Case Red). For this to be as successful, air superiority would be required first, as it had been during Operation Yellow.

== Luftwaffe plans ==
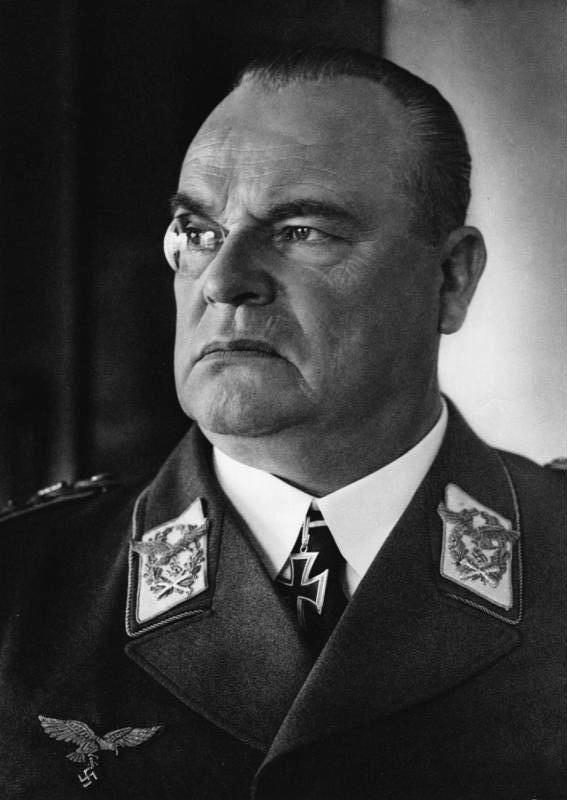
Hugo Sperrle, commander of Luftflotte 3 (Air Fleet 3)

Hugo Sperrle had long planned attacks upon Paris and on 22 May he ordered Fliegerkorps II (Air Corps II) and Fliegerkorps V (Air Corps V) with Kampfgeschwader 77 (Bomber Wing 77) and Generaloberst (General Colonel) Ulrich Grauert's I Fliegerdivision, III./Kampfgeschwader 28 (Bomber Wing 28) to bomb Paris. Bad weather prevented the operation. Determined to continue with his plans, Sperrle ordered Otto Hoffmann von Waldau and Helmuth von Hoffman, Gruppenkommandeur (Group Commander) of III./KG 28, to plan an operation named Paula the following day, on 23 May 1940.

The operation was broad in its scope. As well as eliminating French airfields and aircraft factories around Paris, in von Waldau's words, the bombing was to "achieve a desirable influence on the morale of the capital". German reconnaissance aircraft reported 1,244 aircraft on airfields in and around Paris, including 550–650 single engine aircraft. This French air power was to be destroyed along with the aviation factories in the area. French anti aircraft artillery (AAA) defences were mapped from tactical to operational level, and intelligence of French ground defences was therefore good. The operation was due to be carried out on 30 May, but again, bad weather prevented it.

The operation was compromised by poor staff work and excessive confidence in the "invulnerable" Enigma cipher machine. British intelligence, which had been able to decrypt the German codes via Ultra, forewarned the French. On 30 May they intercepted a message sent by Grauert discussing the arrangements he was making for his Corps. Compounding the problem for Germany, the units involved received incomplete orders for the assault. Oberst Johann-Volkmar Fisser, Geschwaderkommodore (Wing Commander) of KG 77 complained about this. He asked the Headquarters of VIII Fliegerkorps, and was told that the target was "Paris". Sperrle responded to his request by removing KG 77 from the order of battle. The British intercepted Frisser's request to VIII Fliegerkorps, and passed it to the French. The French had intercepted similar messages, and in response they doubled their aircraft strength to 120 fighters.

== Forces involved ==
=== German ===
Units from both Luftflotte 2 and Luftflotte 3 (Air Fleet 1 and 2) were made available for the operation. Kampfgeschwader (Bomber Wings) and Jagdgeschwader (Fighter Wings) with aircraft from Lehrgeschwader 1, (LG 1), Kampfgeschwader 1 (KG 1), Kampfgeschwader 2 (KG 2), Kampfgeschwader 3 (KG 3), Kampfgeschwader 4 (KG 4), Kampfgeschwader 54 (KG 54), Kampfgeschwader 55 (KG 55) and Kampfgeschwader 76 (KG 76), escorted by fighter aircraft from Jagdgeschwader 2 (JG 2), Jagdgeschwader 26 (JG 26), Jagdgeschwader 27 (JG 27), Jagdgeschwader 53 (JG 53), Zerstörergeschwader 2 (ZG 2) and Zerstörergeschwader 76 (ZG 76) were to carry out the attack.

KG 1, ZG 76 and LG 1 were under the command of I. Fliegerkorps. ZG 2, KG 3 and II./KG 2 were under the command of II. Fliegerkorps. KG 55 and III./KG 54 were under IV. Fliegerkorps. KG 51 served under V. Fliegerkorps. KG 4 and JG 26 were under the command of the IX. Fliegerdivision. JG 2 and JG 27 were under the command of VIII. Fliegerkorps. Jagdfliegerführer 3 lent JG 53 for the operation.

Stab. and I./KG 2 moved to Trier-Euren for the attack. I./KG 2 operated from Wengerohr, and III./KG 2 was to operate from Kirchenburg. Stab. KG 55 operated from Schwabisch. I., II., III./KG 55 operated from Reims, Heilbronn and Eutingen respectively. KG 3's, I., II., and III., Gruppe were based at Aschaffenburg, Schweinfurt and Würzburg. These units were based at unknown French bases by 3 June. KG 4 and its units were based at Gütersloh, Fassberg and Delmenhorst. It is likely that some of KG 3's units moved to bases near Lille for the attack. KG 1's I., II., III., Gruppe were based at Giessen, Kirtorf and Ettinghausen. It likely that some of these units also moved to captured French airfields by 3 June. It is possible they were based at Rosières-en-Santerre. Only I./KG 54 took part in the raid from the Geschwader (Wing). KG 54 was probably located in somewhere in northern France on 3 June. It was originally based at Köln-Ostheim. The fighter units were based at the following airfields: Abbeville (ZG 76); Darmstadt, Neufchâteau, Freiburg (ZG 2); Le Touquet, La Capelle, Étaples (JG 26); Couvron, Oulchy-le-Château, (JG 2); Guise (JG 27); Épernay, Douzy, Charleville-Mézières, La Selve (JG 53).

KG 2 put up 99 bombers for the raid and KG 55 committed 66 bombers from their three Gruppen. Altogether the Luftwaffe fielded 640 bombers and 460 fighters.

=== French ===
Tasked with the defence of the greater Paris area was the Zone d'Opérations Aériennes Nord or Z.O.A.N (Northern Zone of Air Operations). Groupe de Chasse I/145 (Polish) armed with Caudron C.714 fighters were based at Dreux. G.C. I/1 with Bloch MB.152s were based at Chantilly-Les Aigles. G.C. II/1 Bloch 152s were deployed to Brétigny-sur-Orge airfield. G.C. II/10 Bloch 152s were located at Bernay-en-Ponthieu, while G.C. III/10 Bloch 152s were based at Deauville. More fighter units operating the Dewoitine D.520 are also listed on the order of battle: G.C. I/3 at Meaux–Esbly, G.C. II/3 at La Ferté-sur-Chiers–Gaucher, G.C. III/3 with the D.520 and Morane-Saulnier M.S.406 at Illiers-l'Évêque. Further units were located along the line. G.C. I/4 with Curtiss H-75s at Évreux-Fauville, G.C. II/4 Curtiss H-75 at Orconte, G.C. I/6 Morane 406s at Lognes–Émerainville, G.C. III/7 (Morane 406s) at Coulommiers, G.C. I/8 Bloch 152s at Claye-Souilly, and G.C. II/9 Bloch 152s at Connantre. These units were supported by night fighter units, (Groupement de Chasse de Nuit, Night Hunting Group), E.C.M.J. 1/16, E.C.N. 1/13, 2/13, 3/13 and 4/13 equipped with the Potez 631. All in all, these groups totalled 240 aircraft. Only 120 fighters were made available to counter German attacks.

== The battle ==
On 3 June, the French units were warned an hour before the German bombers took off, but owing to equally poor staff work, few French squadrons heard the scramble signal when it was radioed from the Eiffel Tower and some were caught on the ground. In the end, only eighty took off to intercept the incoming German formations. German progress was monitored by shadowing Potez 631s, one of which was shot down. The Germans would copy this tactic when intercepting United States Army Air Force (USAAF) heavy bombers during the Defence of the Reich campaign. Along with French AAA defences, the fighters shot down ten German aircraft, including four bombers. One of these machines was piloted by Jagdfliegerführer 3 (Fighter Flying Leader 3) Oberst Gerd von Massow. He was replaced by Oberst Werner Junck, until the former's release by German forces on 12 June 1940. Geschwaderkommodore of KG 51, Josef Kammhuber, who was wounded in action and taken as a prisoner of war, was brought down on this date, although it is not clear if KG 51 was involved in Paula. Kammhuber would be released after the French surrender. He was replaced as Geschwaderkommodore of KG 51 by Fisser, commander of KG 77. Fisser was killed two months later leading KG 51 during the Battle of Britain. At least one source does not place KG 51 on the order of battle. German formations attacked twenty-eight railways and marshalling yard centres. All damage inflicted was light. None were out of action for more than 24 hours.

Most of the German bombers had passed over and had an altitude advantage over French fighters trying to gain height to intercept. Skirmishes were few and far between, but some French units suffered heavy losses. For the attack, the Germans had used the new C-250 Flammbombe (Flame Bomb) which had only been cleared for use 24 hours earlier. The incendiary bomb did some damage to hangars and parked aircraft.

== Aftermath ==
The Germans believed they had struck a mortal blow against the ALA. German post-operation analysis indicated a resounding success. It suggested a long list of wrecked French factories and destroyed aircraft on the ground and in the air. The Germans claimed to have destroyed 75 French aircraft in the air and 400 on the ground. Such was the perceived success, the Luftwaffe concentrated against ports on the northern French coast thereafter. The damage inflicted by the Luftwaffe was far less than the Germans thought. Only 20 French aircraft (16 of them fighters) were destroyed on the ground and 15 of their fighters were shot down in aerial combat, a loss rate of 19 percent, suggesting German over claiming of over 4:1 in the air and 16:1 on the ground. Six of the sixteen airfields hit reported serious damage, while fifteen factories reported minor damage, among them some buildings of both the Renault and Citroen war-converted plants hit by bombs, with Citroen suffering the destruction of an assembling line for 75 mm artillery shells. French casualties on the ground were heavy, including 254 dead and 652 injured. The French shot down 10 German aircraft, including four bombers. They claimed 16, suggesting mutual over claiming. A further 21 vehicles were destroyed. All the French airfields were back in operation 48 hours later.

Although the operation failed to achieve its goals, the first phase of the German invasion, Operation Yellow, had stripped the French Army of its finest formations. The French forces holding the Somme line were mostly reserve divisions of poorer quality and unsupported by heavy artillery, tanks or motorised infantry. The failure of the German air operation did not prevent the German Army from defeating the French in June 1940, or the Luftwaffe in gaining air supremacy at the beginning of Fall Rot. The main reason for German superiority in the air was the poor state of French air units' operational readiness. The Luftwaffe had a smaller margin of numerical superiority over the ALA at the start of Fall Rot as the French aviation industry was starting to reach full potential in production. Some 2,000 French aircraft were available despite the loss of 787 aircraft (473 fighters, 120 bombers and 194 reconnaissance aircraft). The French had 2,086 machines available on 5 June 1940, the first day of Fall Rot, but component production did not match the production of airframes. It was slow and poor, and as a result only 599 aircraft (340 fighters and 170 bombers) were serviceable; a rate of just 29 percent. After the opening of the offensive, the Luftwaffe "ran riot" over French air space. Such was the superiority of the Luftwaffe at that point, that some units were sent home to Germany to refit. The French collapsed altogether just 22 days later, and on 22 June France capitulated.

== See also ==
- List of aircraft of the French Air Force during World War II
- List of World War II military aircraft of Germany
