= Dietrich Peltz =

German WW" Luftwaffe general & bomber pilot (1914-2001)

- Born: 9 June 1914; Gera, German Empire
- Died: 10 August 2001 (aged 87); Munich, Germany
- Relatives: Hans-Karl Stepp (brother in law)
- Military career
- Allegiance: Nazi Germany
- Branch: German Army; Luftwaffe
- Service years: 1934–1945
- Rank: Generalmajor
- Units: StG 2, StG 77, KG 77
- Commands: IX. Fliegerkorps; II. Jagdkorps; I. Fliegerkorps
- Conflicts: See battles World War II: Invasion of Poland; Battle of France; Battle of Britain; Operation Barbarossa; Operation Steinbock; Operation Bodenplatte; Sonderkommando Elbe
- Awards: Knight's Cross of the Iron Cross with Oak Leaves and Swords
- Other work: worked for Krupp and Telefunken

Dietrich Peltz (9 June 1914 – 10 August 2001) was a German World War II Luftwaffe bomber pilot and youngest general of the Wehrmacht. As a pilot he flew approximately 320 combat missions, including roughly 130 as a bomber pilot on the Eastern Front, 90 as a bomber pilot on the Western Front, and 102 as a dive bomber pilot during the invasion of Poland and Battle of France.

Born in Gera, Peltz joined the Reichswehr, later renamed the Wehrmacht, of Nazi Germany in 1934. Initially serving in the Heer (Army), he transferred to the Luftwaffe (Air Force) in 1935. He flew combat missions over Poland and France as a dive bomber pilot. He then converted to the Junkers Ju 88 bomber and was assigned to Kampfgeschwader 77 (KG 77—77th Bomber Wing). With this unit he flew further combat missions in the Battle of Britain. He was awarded the Knight's Cross of the Iron Cross on 14 October 1940. During Operation Barbarossa, the German invasion of the Soviet Union, Peltz was instrumental in developing bombing techniques which allowed precision bombing attacks. This achievement earned him the Knight's Cross of the Iron Cross with Oak Leaves on 31 December 1941. He was then posted to a bomber unit leaders school before he was tasked to form a unit, I. Gruppe (1st group) of Kampfgeschwader 60 (KG 60—60th Bomber Wing), specialized in the use of precision-guided munitions against Allied shipping.

In early 1943, Peltz was appointed Inspector of Combat Flight, a role in which he oversaw the strategic development of the German bomber arm. As of August 1943, he was appointed commanding general of the IX. Fliegerkorps (9th Air Corps) and was tasked with reviving the German bomber offensive as Angriffsführer England (attack leader England) against Britain and was awarded the Knight's Cross of the Iron Cross with Oak Leaves and Swords on 23 July 1943 for his leadership. This initiative lead to a night-time strategic bombing campaign against southern England code-named Operation Steinbock, which ended in heavy losses for German bombers in early 1944. Although a bomber expert, he was appointed commanding general of the II. Jagdkorps (2nd Fighter Corps) and was responsible for the planning of the unsuccessful Operation Bodenplatte, the attack of German fighters on Allied air bases in Belgium and the Netherlands. He was tasked with the entire aerial Defense of the Reich in March 1945 and advocated the idea of "ramming" to halt the air campaign against Germany even at the risk of sustaining high losses. His last service position was commanding general of I. Fliegerkorps (1st Air Corps). After the war he worked for Krupp and Telefunken and died on 10 August 2001 in Munich.

== Early life and career ==
Peltz was born on 9 June 1914 in Gera-Reuß, in Thuringia, at the time a Principality of Reuss-Gera. He was the son of a factory director. Aged 18 he had received a pilot's license and graduated in 1933 with his Abitur (diploma) from the Hermann Lietz country boarding school in Spiekeroog.

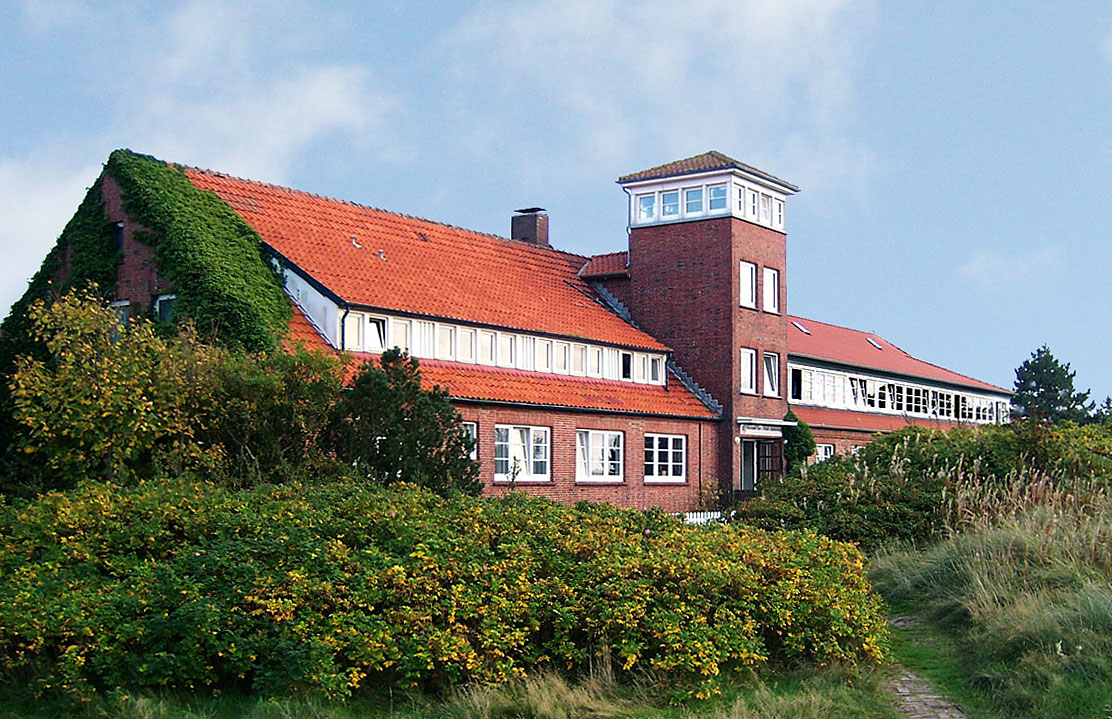
Hermann Lietz school in Spiekeroog.

After his graduation, Peltz did an internship at Mercedes-Benz in Stuttgart-Untertürkheim in the years 1933–34. He joined the military service of the Reichsheer as an officer candidate with the 1st company of the Kraftfahr-Abteilung 5 (5th Motor Vehicle Department) in Stuttgart-Cannstatt on 4 April 1934. Here he served as a Kradschütze (motorcycle infantry) and was promoted to Fahnenjunker-Unteroffizier (cadet-corporal) on 1 December 1934.

While attending the Kriegsschule (war school) of the Heer (Army) in Munich, he was promoted to Fähnrich (ensign) on 1 June 1935. He was promoted to Oberfähnrich (senior ensign) on 1 October 1935 and transferred to the Air War School Klotzsche in Dresden. He then received further training at the flight school in Salzwedel which he completed on 31 March 1936. One day later, on 1 April, he was promoted to Leutnant (second lieutenant) and on 20 April was officially transferred to Jagdgeschwader "Immelmann", named after the World War I fighter pilot Max Immelmann, at Lübeck-Blankensee. During this assignment, he was posted to the blind-flying school at Wesendorf-Neuburg an der Donau.

Jagdgeschwader "Immelmann" was renamed to Sturzkampfgeschwader 162 (StG 162—162nd Dive Bomber Wing) and equipped with the early Junkers Ju 87A dive bomber. (Note: For an explanation of Luftwaffe unit designations, see Organisation of the Luftwaffe during World War II.) In 1937, Peltz was appointed adjutant of the I. Gruppe (group) which was renamed to I. Gruppe of Sturzkampfgeschwader 168 (StG 168—168th Dive Bomber Wing) on 1 April 1938. Following the Anschluss, the annexation of Austria into Nazi Germany, just as the Junkers Ju 87B came into service, this unit was moved to Graz and was referred to as II. Gruppe of Sturzkampfgeschwader 2 (StG 2—2nd Dive Bomber Wing). On 1 March 1939, Peltz was promoted to Oberleutnant (first lieutenant). Two months later, on 1 May 1939, the Gruppe was again renamed and was known as I. Gruppe of Sturzkampfgeschwader 76 (StG 76—76th Dive Bomber Wing), sometimes referred to as Grazer Gruppe. On this day, Peltz was appointed Staffelkapitän (squadron leader) of the 1. Staffel (1st squadron).

Peltz led 1. Staffel in the Ju 87 dive bombing demonstration at Neuhammer, present-day Świętoszów, Poland, on 15 August 1939. Observing the demonstration were the senior Luftwaffe commanders, including Generals Hugo Sperrle, Bruno Loerzer, and Wolfram von Richthofen. The lower cloud layer, which was believed to be at 900 meters (3,000 feet), was only 100 m (330 ft). During the demonstration, 13 Ju 87 crews crashed to their deaths as they misjudged the cloud layer and failed to pull up in time. The event became known as the "Neuhammer Stuka Disaster" (Neuhammer Stuka-Unglück).

== World War II ==
World War II in Europe began on Friday 1 September 1939 when German forces invaded Poland. Peltz flew 45 combat missions with his Staffel against Poland, attacking railway lines, traffic junctions and bridges as well as the Bombing of Wieluń. For his services in Poland he received the Iron Cross 2nd Class (Eisernes Kreuz 2. Klasse) on 15 September 1939. During the Battle of France, beginning on 10 May 1940, he flew with the same Staffel which was renamed to 1. Staffel of Sturzkampfgeschwader 3 (StG 3—3rd Dive Bomber Wing) on 5 July 1940. Again he targeted railway lines, traffic junctions and bridges. In addition he attacked shipping at Calais and during the Battle of Dunkirk sank a transport vessel. In total he flew eight missions against Dunkirk and was awarded the Iron Cross 1st Class (Eisernes Kreuz 1. Klasse) on 22 May 1940. He flew an additional 57 missions before the campaign in France came to an end on 25 June 1940. In total, Peltz flew 102 combat missions over Poland and France, leading his Staffel through these campaigns without loss.

=== Bomber pilot ===
Following the Battle of France, Peltz was sent to Greifswald for conversion training to the Junkers Ju 88. In August 1940 he was posted to the Geschwaderstab (headquarters unit) of Kampfgeschwader 77 (KG 77—77th Bomber Wing) based in Laon at the Channel Front. He flew 70 daytime and nocturnal missions in the Battle of Britain including special operations of him alone attacking specific targets. Following his 130th mission in total as a dive bomber pilot over Poland and France, as well as a bomber pilot over England, he was awarded the Knight's Cross of the Iron Cross (Ritterkreuz des Eisernen Kreuzes) on 14 October 1940. The presentation was made by Reichsmarschall Hermann Göring, he received the award together with Major (Major) Friedrich Kless, Gruppenkommandeur (group commander) of the II./Kampfgeschwader 55 (KG 55—55th Bomber Wing).

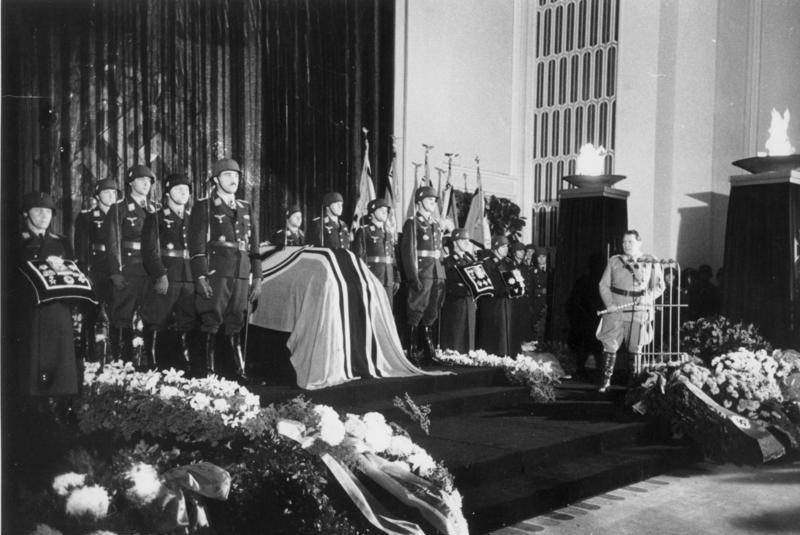
Peltz at the funeral of Ernst Udet. (Note: Peltz is the 3rd person on the left side of the coffin behind Adolf Galland and Walter Oesau.)

Peltz was appointed Staffelkapitän in KG 77 in November 1940 and promoted to Hauptmann (captain) on 1 March 1941. Less than two weeks later, on 12 March, he was given command of the II. Gruppe of KG 77. With this unit he relocated to East Prussia in June 1941, in the prelude of Operation Barbarossa, the German invasion of the Soviet Union on 22 June 1941. He flew support missions for the Heer against targets in the Northern sector, including the Leningrad-Moscow railway line, railway stations, marshalling yards, canals and lock gates. Here, Peltz was instrumental in developing accurate bombing techniques, allowing his group to achieve success against precision targets which previously could be achieved only with much larger bomber forces. He flew his 200th combat mission on 12 July 1941.

Peltz was ordered to surrender his command of II./KG 77 on 30 September 1941 to Haupmann Heinrich Paepcke and was posted to the Luftwaffenstab (Air Force headquarters) at the Ministry of Aviation (RLM—Reichsluftfahrtministerium) in Berlin. In numerous discussions within the Luftwaffe High Command he advocated the necessity of a bomber unit commander's school. He was put in charge of diver-bomber training at the unit leadership school for bomber pilots (Verbandsführerschule für Kampfflieger) at Foggia in Italy. For his previous achievements as a pilot accumulated during roughly 250 combat missions, Peltz was awarded the Knight's Cross of the Iron Cross with Oak Leaves (Ritterkreuz des Eisernen Kreuzes mit Eichenlaub)on 31 December 1941. The 46th member of the Wehrmacht so honored. The presentation, together with Major Otto Weiß and Major Hubertus Hitschhold, was made at the Wolf's Lair, Hitler's headquarters in Rastenburg, present-day Kętrzyn in Poland, in January 1942.

In January 1942, Peltz was made Commanding Officer of the bomber unit commanders school at Foggia, where all operational bomber commanders were trained in the latest operational techniques. In the timeframe of 8–31 July 1942 he served as an officer for special assignments (Offizier zur besonderen Verwendung) of the RLM and Commander-in-Chief of the Luftwaffe. In this period fell his promotion to Major on 18 July 1942. The bomber unit commanders school relocated from Foggia to Tours in France in mid-1942. Here the I. Gruppe of Kampfgeschwader 60 (KG 60—60th Bomber Wing) was raised from the bomber unit commander's school and Peltz was appointed its Gruppenkommandeur on 1 August 1942. The Gruppe, equipped with the Ju 88 A-4, was tasked with developing on the use of precision guided munitions then under development in Germany, such as the Fritz X and Henschel Hs 293, against Allied shipping. Operational by October 1942, this unit was sent to Norway against the Allied Murmansk convoys, but only three weeks later was switched to bases in Sardinia to counter the Allied "Torch" invasion, the British-American invasion of French North Africa.

=== Luftwaffe commander ===
Peltz was promoted to Oberstleutnant (lieutenant colonel) on 1 December 1942. A month later, on 1 January 1943, Peltz replaced the World War I veteran Generalleutnant (Lieutenant General) Johannes Fink as the Inspector of Combat Flight with the Oberkommando der Luftwaffe (OKL—Air Force High Command). In this role he was questioned by Reichsmarschall Göring on the use of the Messerschmitt Me 262 jet aircraft as bomber. Peltz pointed out to Göring that it would be very difficult to aim a bomb, let alone hit a target with the Me 262. He went on and explained that the Me 262 was unsuitable for dive bombing, and in level flight, hitting a target of the size of one square kilometer (0.39 sq mi) depended largely on luck. Göring, under pressure to present Hitler with a fast bomber capable of avoiding the Allied fighters, was infuriated by his assessment. Peltz went on to explain that the problem of staying in formation during bad weather would further negate the bombing effect as attacks would have to be made by single aircraft. Peltz then went on and argued that the Me 262 would be better utilized as an interceptor aircraft.

Peltz was promoted to Oberst im Generalstab (colonel in the General Staff) on 17 March 1943 with a Rangdienstalter (RDA—rank seniority) of 1 September 1943. In addition to his other obligations, he was appointed Angriffsführer England (attack leader England) on 24 March 1943. The idea was to revive the German bomber offensive against Britain by combining all the available bomber resources under one command. In this command position he became the 31st member of the Wehrmacht to receive the Knight's Cross of the Iron Cross with Oak Leaves and Swords (Ritterkreuz des Eisernen Kreuzes mit Eichenlaub und Schwertern) on 23 July 1943. As Angriffsführer England he controlled elements of Kampfgeschwader 2 (KG 2—2nd Bomber Wing), Kampfgeschwader 6 (KG 6—6th Bomber Wing), Kampfgeschwader 30 (KG 30—30th Bomber Wing), Kampfgeschwader 51 (KG 51—51st Bomber Wing), Kampfgeschwader 54 (KG 54—54th Bomber Wing) and the I. Gruppen (1st groups) of Kampfgeschwader 66 (KG 66—66th Bomber Wing), Kampfgeschwader 76 (KG 76—76th Bomber Wing), Kampfgeschwader 100 (KG 100—100th Bomber Wing) and Schnellkampfgeschwader 10 (SKG 10—10th Fast Bomber Wing), as well as the 1. Staffel of Aufklärungsgruppe 123 (123rd Reconnaissance Group). These units were then consolidated under the command of IX. Fliegerkorps (9th Air Corps) and Peltz was appointed its commander on 4 September 1943. He commanded this unit until 14 October 1944. In this command position, he was promoted to Generalmajor (major general) on 1 November 1943 with a RDA of 1 May 1944.

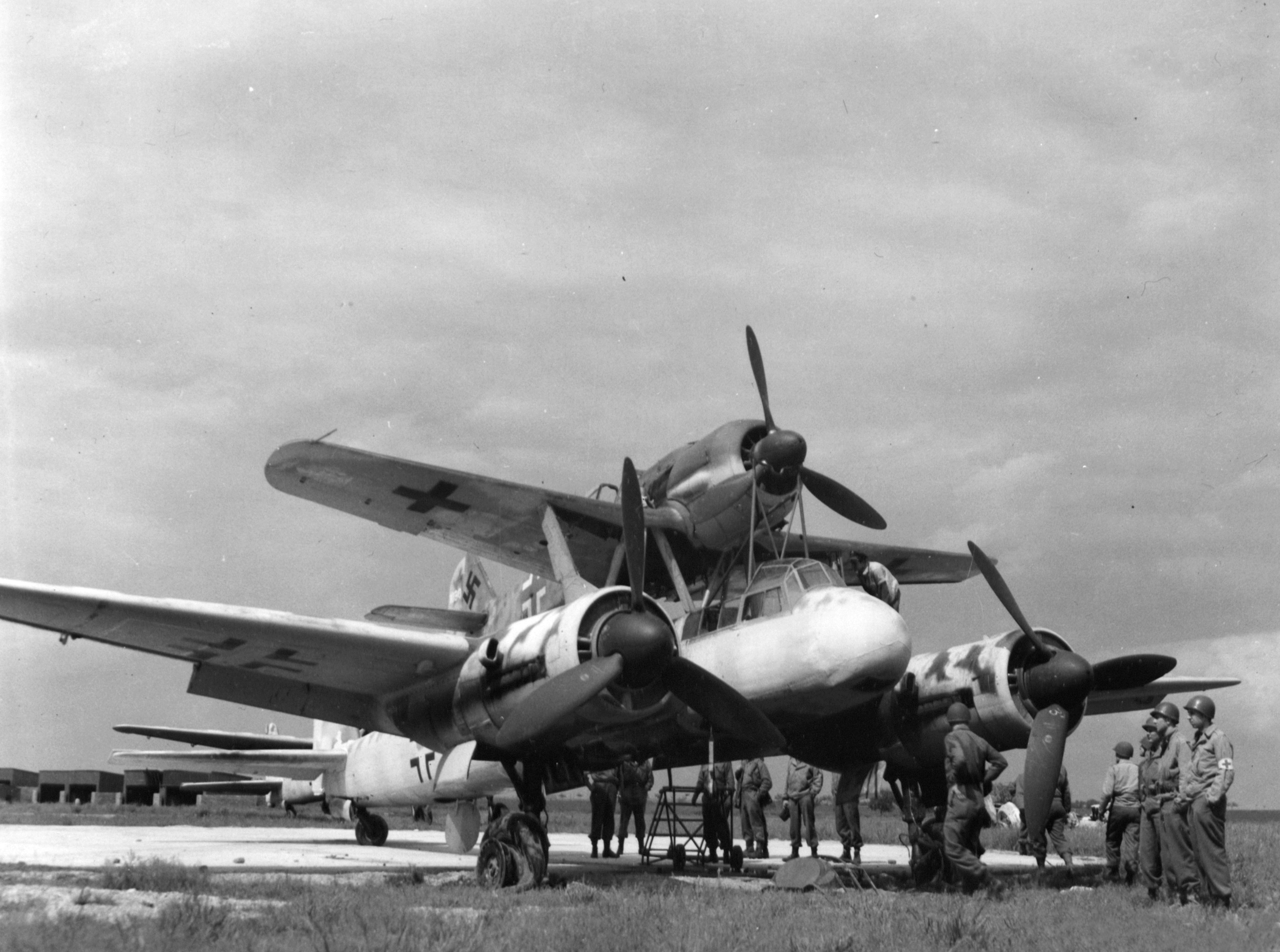
A captured example of a Mistel trainer. United States Army personnel examined the aircraft.

The Mistel project, a composite aircraft configuration, was advocated by Peltz at the time. The configuration was a fighter aircraft mounted on top of a pilot-less bomber aircraft with its crew compartment replaced with a high-explosive warhead. The plan was to use these weapon systems against hardened targets such as bridges and enemy shipping.

IX Fliegerkorps commanded the Luftwaffe bomber forces in Operation Steinbock (21 January – 29 May 1944), the retaliatory bombing of England, referred to as the "Baby Blitz", which ended in heavy losses for German bombers. In December and early January, Peltz carefully husbanded together some 500 aircraft including Junkers Ju 88s, Ju 188s, Dornier Do 217s, Me 410s and the troublesome Heinkel He 177 A-series onto French airfields to form IX Fliegerkorps. The attacks, initially against London and the industrial areas and later against coastal targets, dwindled to a halt in late May after heavy losses to the Germans, with little to show for the effort.

Following the Allied Invasion of Normandy the already largely depleted bomber forces had to fly support missions of the Heer on the Invasion Front. On 10 October 1944, the bomber crews of IX Fliegerkorps were remustered as infantry or as fighter pilots. On 11 November, Göring, in his role as commander-in-chief of the Luftwaffe, organized a meeting of high-ranking Luftwaffe officers, chaired by Peltz. The meeting, also referred to as the "Areopag" was held at the Luftkriegsakademie (air war academy) at Berlin-Gatow. This Luftwaffe version of the Greek Areopagus—a court of justice—aimed at finding solutions to the deteriorating air war situation over Germany.

Peltz, who by training and experience was a bomber expert but admired by Hitler for efficiency in carrying out orders, became the commander of the II. Jagdkorps (2nd Fighter Corps) which saw action during the Ardennes offensive, in particular the Operation Bodenplatte, the attempt to gain air superiority during the stagnant stage of the Battle of the Bulge so that the German Army and Waffen-SS forces could resume their advance. The operation achieved some surprise and tactical success, but was ultimately a failure. A great many Allied aircraft were destroyed on the ground but replaced within a week. Allied aircrew casualties were quite small, since the majority of Allied losses were empty planes sitting on the ground. The Germans, however, lost many of their fighter pilots that they could not readily replace.

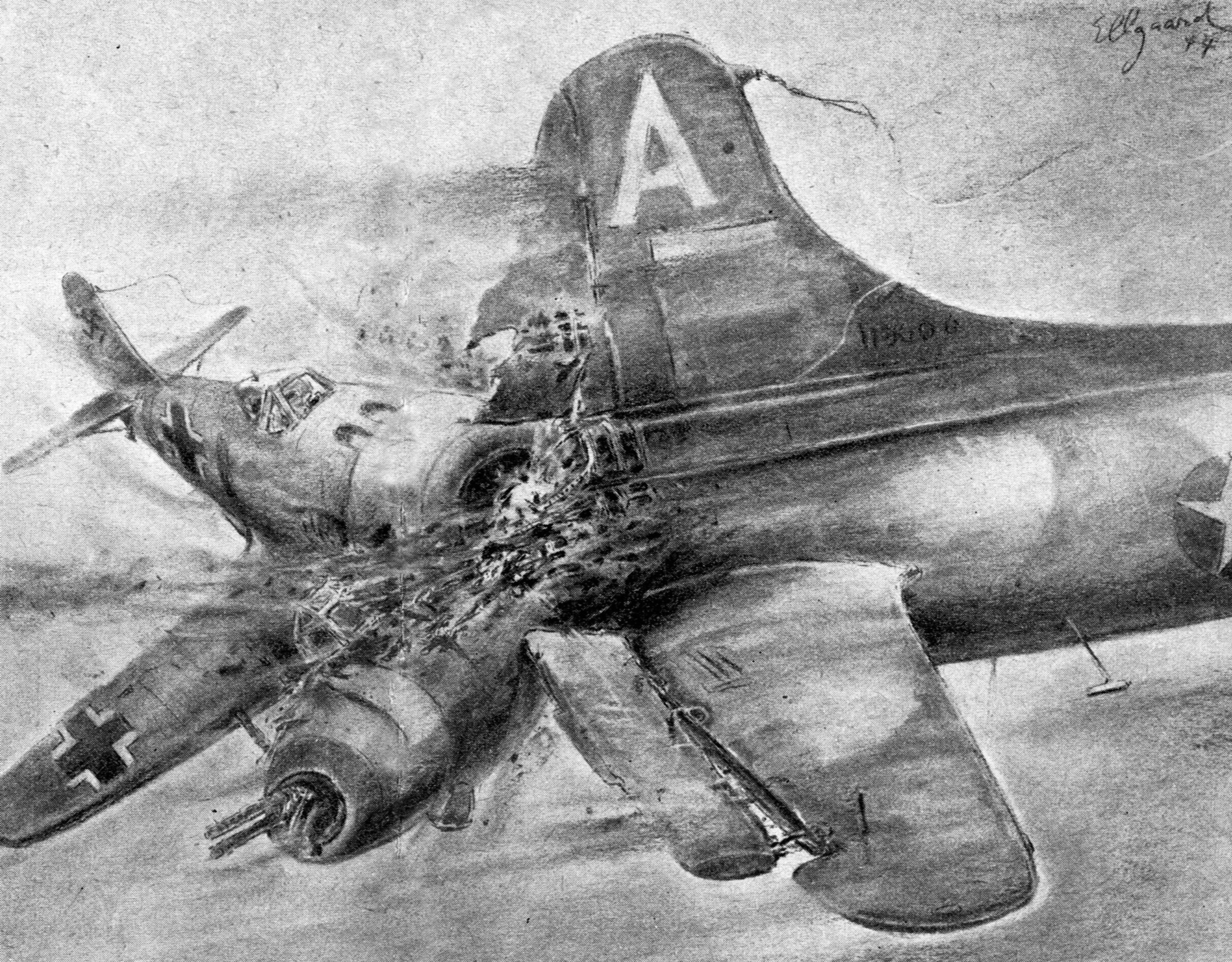
A 1944 drawing by Helmuth Ellgaard illustrating "ramming"

To counter the overwhelming Allied bomber offensive against Germany, Peltz, together with Oberst Hajo Herrmann, advocated the idea of ramming the American four-engined bombers. The concept called for having young and regime-loyal, but relatively poorly trained, fighter pilots volunteer for these suicide missions.

In mid-January 1945, Peltz visited the Luftkriegsschule 2 in Berlin-Gatow to recruit volunteers for ramming missions against the Allied bomber force. The Luftwaffe command was expecting an attrition rate of 90%, nevertheless all 80 student pilots volunteered. The pilots were trained for the ramming attack at Stendal near Magdeburg under the cover name Schulungslehrgang Elbe (Training Course Elbe). The original idea was centered on a mass attack of 1,500 aircraft. This could not be realized and on 7 April 1945, 183 fighters attacked the Eighth Air Force. The attack resulted in the destruction of 23, potentially more, four-engined bombers at the cost of 133 German aircraft lost.

In March, Peltz, the youngest general in the Wehrmacht, had been tasked with the obligation to coordinate the entire aerial Defense of the Reich. At the end of World War II in Europe he was commanding general of the I. Fliegerkorps (1st Air Corps).

During the final days of World War II in Europe, Generalleutnant Adolf Galland attempted to surrender Jagdverband 44 (JV 44—44th Fighter Unit), an elite Me 262 jet fighter unit, to American forces. At the same time General der Flieger Karl Koller had ordered JV 44 to relocate to Prague and continue fighting. Oberstleutnant Heinrich Bär, who was substituting for the injured Galland as commander of JV 44, attempted to ignore the order. Bär was further pressured to relocate JV 44 by Peltz, as commander of the IX. Fliegerkorps, and Oberst Herrmann, commander of 9. Flieger-Division (J), who unexpectedly emerged at the control room in Maxglan on 2 May 1945. A heated and violent dispute erupted between Bär, Peltz and Herrmann, witnessed by Walter Krupinski. He later recalled that Bär responded with "We are under the command of Generalleutnant Galland, and I will only follow orders of Generalleutnant Galland!" — an act of disobedience that Krupinski believed could have led to Bär being shot for insubordination.

== Later life and career ==
After Peltz was released as a prisoner of war, he found work in private industry. Initially he worked for Krupp in Essen and Rheinhausen. In 1963 he found employment with Telefunken where he stayed until his retirement. His last position was chief representative of Telefunken and head of the factory in Konstanz. Peltz, who was the brother-in-law of Hans-Karl Stepp, died on 10 August 2001 in Munich.

== Summary of career ==
Peltz flew approximately 320 combat missions, 130 of which as a bomber pilot on the Eastern Front and 90 on the Western Front, and 102 missions over Poland and Western Front as a ground-attack pilot (Stuka).

=== Awards ===
- Front Flying Clasp of the Luftwaffe in Gold with Pennant "300"
- Pilot/Observer Badge in Gold with Diamonds
- Iron Cross (1939)
  - 2nd Class (15 September 1939)
  - 1st Class (22 May 1940)
- Knight's Cross of the Iron Cross with Oak Leaves and Swords
  - Knight's Cross on 14 October 1940 as Oberleutnant and Staffelkapitän of the 1./Sturzkampfgeschwader 3
  - 46th Oak Leaves on 31 December 1941 as Hauptmann and Gruppenkommandeur of the II./Kampfgeschwader 77
  - 31st Swords on 23 July 1943 as Oberst im Generalstab of Angriffsführer England

=== Dates of rank ===
1 December 1934:	Fahnenjunker-Unteroffizier (Cadet-Corporal)
1 June 1935:	Fähnrich (Ensign)
1 October 1935:	Oberfähnrich (Senior Ensign)
1 April 1936:	Leutnant (Second Lieutenant)
1 March 1939:	Oberleutnant (First Lieutenant)
1 March 1941:	Hauptmann (Captain)
18 July 1942:	Major (Major)
1 December 1942:	Oberstleutnant (Lieutenant Colonel)
17 March 1943:	Oberst (Colonel), with a rank age date 1 September 1943
1 November 1943:	Generalmajor (Brigadier General)

== Notes ==
Military offices
Preceded by Generalleutnant Johannes Fink	Commander of Inspector of Combat Flight; 1 January 1943 – 3 September 1943	Succeeded by Oberstleutnant Joachim Helbig (acting)
Preceded by none	Angriffsführer England; 24 March 1943 – April 1943	Succeeded by Oberstleutnant Willy Bauss
Preceded by General Stefan Fröhlich	Commander of IX. Fliegerkorps; 4 September 1943 – 12 November 1944	Succeeded by unknown
Preceded by General Alfred Bülowius	Commander of II. Jagdkorps; 15 October 1944 – 26 January 1945	Succeeded by Generalmajor Karl-Eduard Wilke
Preceded by unknown	Commander of IX. Fliegerkorps; 26 January 1945 – 8 May 1945	Succeeded by none
