= List of Knight's Cross of the Iron Cross recipients (C) =

The Knight's Cross of the Iron Cross (German: Ritterkreuz des Eisernen Kreuzes) and its variants were the highest awards in the military and paramilitary forces of Nazi Germany during World War II. The Knight's Cross of the Iron Cross was awarded for a wide range of reasons and across all ranks, from a senior commander for skilled leadership of his troops in battle to a low-ranking soldier for a single act of extreme gallantry. A total of 7,321 awards were made between its first presentation on 30 September 1939 and its last bestowal on 17 June 1945. (Note: Großadmiral and President of Germany Karl Dönitz, Hitler's successor as Head of State (Staatsoberhaupt) and Supreme Commander of the Armed Forces, had ordered the cessation of all promotions and awards as of 11 May 1945 (Dönitz-decree). Consequently the last Knight's Cross awarded to Oberleutnant zur See of the Reserves Georg-Wolfgang Feller on 17 June 1945 must therefore be considered a de facto but not de jure hand-out.) This number is based on the analysis and acceptance of the order commission of the Association of Knight's Cross Recipients (AKCR). Presentations were made to members of the three military branches of the Wehrmacht—the Heer (Army), Kriegsmarine (Navy) and Luftwaffe (Air Force)—as well as the Waffen-SS, the Reichsarbeitsdienst (RAD—Reich Labour Service) and the Volkssturm (German national militia). There were also 43 recipients in the military forces of allies of the Third Reich.

These recipients are listed in the 1986 edition of Walther-Peer Fellgiebel's book, Die Träger des Ritterkreuzes des Eisernen Kreuzes 1939–1945 — The Bearers of the Knight's Cross of the Iron Cross 1939–1945. Fellgiebel was the former chairman and head of the order commission of the AKCR. In 1996, the second edition of this book was published with an addendum delisting 11 of these original recipients. Author Veit Scherzer has cast doubt on a further 193 of these listings. The majority of the disputed recipients had received the award in 1945, when the deteriorating situation of Germany in the final days of World War II in Europe left a number of nominations incomplete and pending in various stages of the approval process.

Listed here are the 82 Knight's Cross recipients of the Wehrmacht and Waffen-SS whose last name starts with "C". The recipients are initially ordered alphabetically by last name. The rank listed is the recipient's rank at the time the Knight's Cross was awarded.

== Background ==
The Knight's Cross of the Iron Cross and its higher grades were based on four separate enactments. The first enactment, Reichsgesetzblatt I S. 1573 of 1 September 1939 instituted the Iron Cross (Eisernes Kreuz), the Knight's Cross of the Iron Cross and the Grand Cross of the Iron Cross (Großkreuz des Eisernen Kreuzes). Article 2 of the enactment mandated that the award of a higher class be preceded by the award of all preceding classes. As the war progressed, some of the recipients of the Knight's Cross distinguished themselves further and a higher grade, the Knight's Cross of the Iron Cross with Oak Leaves (Ritterkreuz des Eisernen Kreuzes mit Eichenlaub), was instituted. The Oak Leaves, as they were commonly referred to, were based on the enactment Reichsgesetzblatt I S. 849 of 3 June 1940. In 1941, two higher grades of the Knight's Cross were instituted. The enactment Reichsgesetzblatt I S. 613 of 28 September 1941 introduced the Knight's Cross of the Iron Cross with Oak Leaves and Swords (Ritterkreuz des Eisernen Kreuzes mit Eichenlaub und Schwertern) and the Knight's Cross of the Iron Cross with Oak Leaves, Swords and Diamonds (Ritterkreuz des Eisernen Kreuzes mit Eichenlaub, Schwertern und Brillanten). At the end of 1944 the final grade, the Knight's Cross of the Iron Cross with Golden Oak Leaves, Swords, and Diamonds (Ritterkreuz des Eisernen Kreuzes mit goldenem Eichenlaub, Schwertern und Brillanten), based on the enactment Reichsgesetzblatt 1945 I S. 11 of 29 December 1944, became the final variant of the Knight's Cross authorized.

== Recipients ==
Knight's Cross of the Iron Cross (C)
| Service | Number of presentations | Posthumous presentations |
|---|---|---|
| Heer | 51 | 3 |
| Kriegsmarine | 5 | 0 |
| Luftwaffe | 22 | 1 |
| Waffen-SS | 4 | 1 |

The Oberkommando der Wehrmacht (Supreme Command of the Armed Forces) kept separate Knight's Cross lists for the Heer (Army), Kriegsmarine (Navy), Luftwaffe (Air Force) and Waffen-SS. Within each of these lists a unique sequential number was assigned to each recipient. The same numbering paradigm was applied to the higher grades of the Knight's Cross, one list per grade. Of the 82 awards made to servicemen whose last name starts with "C", ten were later awarded the Knight's Cross of the Iron Cross with Oak Leaves and five presentations were made posthumously. Heer members received 51 of the medals, five went to the Kriegsmarine, 22 to the Luftwaffe, and four to the Waffen-SS.

This along with the + (plus) indicates that a higher grade of Knight's Cross was awarded as well.
This along with the * (asterisk) indicates that the Knight's Cross was awarded posthumously.

| Name | Service | Rank | Role and unit (Note: For an explanation of the various naming schemes used by the Luftwaffe, Heer, Kriegsmarine and Waffen-SS refer to nomenclature used by the Wehrmacht and Waffen-SS.) | Date of award | Notes | Image |
|---|---|---|---|---|---|---|
| Werner Canders | Heer | Major | Commander of the III./Grenadier-Regiment 408 | 6 April 1944 | — | — |
| Ulrich Freiherr von Canstein | Heer | Oberstleutnant | Commander of Grenadier-Regiment 220 | 12 February 1944 | — | — |
| Kurt Capesius | Luftwaffe | Hauptmann | Deputy Gruppenkommandeur of the III./Kampfgeschwader 66 | 30 November 1944 | — | — |
| Wilhelm Cappel | Heer | Oberstleutnant | Commander of Grenadier-Regiment 424 | 23 February 1944 | — | — |
| Horst Carganico | Luftwaffe | Oberleutnant | Staffelkapitän of the 6./Jagdgeschwader 5 (Note: According to Scherzer as Staffelkapitän of the 1./Jagdgeschwader 77.) | 25 September 1941 | — | A man wearing a military uniform sitting. |
| Otto Carius+ | Heer | Leutnant of the Reserves | Zugführer (platoon leader) in the 2./schwere Panzer-Abteilung 502 | 4 May 1944 | Awarded 535th Oak Leaves 27 July 1944 | A man wearing a military uniform with an Iron Cross displayed at the front of his uniform collar. |
| Friedrich Carl | Heer | Oberleutnant | Leader of the 11./Artillerie-Regiment 269 | 9 May 1942 | — | — |
| Rolf Carls | Kriegsmarine | Admiral | Marinegruppenbefehlshaber Ost (Naval Group Commander East) (Note: According to Scherzer a commander-in-chief of Marinegruppenkommando Ost (Naval Group Commando East).) | 14 June 1940 | — | A man wearing a military uniform |
| Alfredo Carpaneto | Heer | Unteroffizier | Panzer commander in the 2./schwere Panzer-Abteilung 502 | 28 March 1945* | Killed in action 26 January 1945 | — |
| Carl Casper | Heer | Oberst | Commander of Infanterie-Regiment 118 (motorized) | 22 September 1941 | — | — |
| Prosper Graf zu Castell-Castell | Heer | Leutnant of the Reserves | Leader of the 9./Panzergrenadier-Regiment 14 | 23 February 1944 | — | — |
| Horst Castka (Note: According to Scherzer last name is spelled Kastka.) | Heer | Oberwachtmeister | Vorgeschobener Beobachter (Artillery observer) in the 11./Artillerie-Regiment 1562 | 11 March 1945 | — | — |
| Albert Celerin | Luftwaffe | Oberleutnant | Pilot and observer in the Fernaufklärungs-Gruppe 4 | 10 October 1944 | — | — |
| Wolfgang von Chamier-Glisczinski | Luftwaffe | Oberst | Geschwaderkommodore of Kampfgeschwader 3 | 6 October 1940 | — | — |
| Friedrich-Wilhelm von Chappuis | Heer | Generalleutnant | Commander of the 15. Infanterie-Division | 15 August 1940 | — | — |
| Hans-Georg von Charpentier | Waffen-SS | SS-Hauptsturmführer (Note: According to Scherzer as SS-Hauptsturmführer of the Reserves.) | Chief of the 3./SS-Reiter-Regiment 1 | 29 October 1942 | — | A man wearing a military uniform and peaked cap. His cap has an emblem in shape of a human skull and crossed bones. |
| Hellmut von der Chevallerie | Heer | Generalmajor | Commander of the 13. Panzer-Division | 30 April 1943 | — | — |
| Kurt von der Chevallerie+ | Heer | Generalleutnant | Commander of the 99. leichte Division | 23 October 1941 | Awarded 357th Oak Leaves 19 December 1943 | — |
| Botho von La Chevallerie | Heer | Major | Commander of the I./Infanterie-Regiment 408 | 24 July 1941 (Note: According to Scherzer on 25 July 1941.) | — | — |
| Kurt Chill | Heer | Generalleutnant | Commander of the 122. Infanterie-Division | 25 October 1943 | — | — |
| Max Chmel | Heer | Obergefreiter | Group leader in the 8./Grenadier-Regiment 200 (motorized) | 18 November 1944 | — | — |
| Dietrich von Choltitz | Heer | Oberstleutnant | Commander of the III./Infanterie-Regiment 16 (LL) (Note: According to Scherzer on 29 May 1940 as commander of the III./Infanterie-Regiment 16.) | 18 May 1940 | — | A man wearing a peaked cap and military uniform with an Iron Cross displayed at the front of his uniform collar. |
| Otto Chowanetz | Heer | Feldwebel | Zugführer (platoon leader) in the 1./Grenadier-Regiment 17 | 8 August 1943 | — | — |
| Torsten Christ | Luftwaffe | Oberstleutnant im Generalstab | Chief of the general staff of the VIII. Fliegerkorps (Note: According to Scherzer as chief of the general staff of the IV. Fliegerkorps.) | 21 October 1942 | — | — |
| Kurt Christel | Heer | Hauptmann (Note: According to Scherzer as Hauptmann of the Reserves zur Verwendung (for disposition) and chief of the 1./Bau-Bataillon 132.) | Company chief in Bau-Bataillon 132 | 4 March 1942* | Killed in action 3 March 1942 | — |
| Fritz Christen | Waffen-SS | SS-Sturmmann | Richtschütze (gunner) in the 2./SS-Panzer-Jagd-Abteilung 3 "Totenkopf" (Note: According to Scherzer as a Richtschütze (gunner) in the 2./SS-Panzer-Jagd-Abteilung of the SS-"Totenkopf"-Division.) | 20 October 1941 | — | — |
| Hans Christern | Heer | Major | Commander of the II./Panzer-Regiment 31 | 31 January 1941 | — | — |
| Georg Christiansen+ | Kriegsmarine | Oberleutnant zur See | Commander of Schnellboot S-101 in the 1. Schnellbootflottille | 8 May 1941 | Awarded 326th Oak Leaves 13 November 1943 | — |
| Georg Christl | Luftwaffe | Hauptmann | Gruppenkommandeur of the III./Zerstörergeschwader 26 "Horst Wessel" | 18 March 1942 | — | — |
| Karl Christmann | Luftwaffe | Oberfeldwebel | Observer in the 6./Kampfgeschwader 53 "Legion Condor" | 5 April 1944 | — | — |
| Kurt Christofzik | Heer | Oberleutnant of the Reserves | Chief of the 6./Grenadier-Regiment 530 | 22 August 1943 | — | — |
| Egon Christophersen | Waffen-SS | SS-Unterscharführer | Group leader in the 7./SS-Freiwilligen-Panzergrenadier-Regiment 24 "Danmark" (Note: According to Scherzer as a group leader in the 7./SS-Panzergrenadier-Regiment 24 "Danmark".) | 11 July 1944 | — | — |
| Bruno Chrobek | Heer | Major | Commander of I./Infanterie-Regiment 54 | 4 July 1940 | — | — |
| Günter Chrzonsz | Heer | Oberwachtmeister | Zugführer (platoon leader) in the 2./Sturmgeschütz-Abteilung 277 | 12 November 1943 | — | — |
| Walter Cierpka | Heer | Major | Commander of Heeres-Artillerie-Abteilung 774 (Note: According to Scherzer as commander of Heeres-Artillerie-Abteilung (22 cm-Mörser, bodenständig) 774.) | 5 April 1945 | — | — |
| Otto Ciliax | Kriegsmarine | Vizeadmiral | Befehlshaber der Schlachtschiffe | 21 March 1942 | — | |
| Oskar Cipa | Heer | Unteroffizier | Group leader in the 1./Infanterie-Regiment 305 | 13 November 1942 | — | — |
| Wilhelm Cirener | Heer | Oberleutnant | Chief of the 3./Pionier-Bataillon 33 | 13 July 1940 | — | — |
| Paul Claas | Luftwaffe | Major | Gruppenkommandeur of the I./Kampfgeschwader 100 | 14 March 1943 | Killed in action 20 June 1943 | — |
| Richard Claassen | Heer | Oberstleutnant | Commander of Infanterie-Regiment 517 | 29 January 1943 | — | — |
| Theo Claassen | Heer | Leutnant (Note: According to Scherzer as Leutnant of the Reserves.) | Zugführer (platoon leader) in the 14.(Panzerjäger)/Grenadier-Regiment 899 | 27 August 1944 | — | — |
| Erwin Clausen+ | Luftwaffe | Oberleutnant | Staffelkapitän of the 6./Jagdgeschwader 77 (Note: According to Scherzer on 22 May 1942 as a pilot in the 1./Jagdgeschwader 77) | 19 May 1942 | Awarded 106th Oak Leaves 23 July 1942 | |
| Karl-Ulrich Clausen | Heer | Hauptmann | Chief of the 2./Artillerie-Regiment 30 | 16 April 1944 | — | — |
| Nicolai Clausen | Kriegsmarine | Kapitänleutnant | Commander of U-129 | 13 March 1942 | — | |
| Ernst Clemente | Heer | Obergefreiter | PAK (anti tank) gunner in the 16./Gebirgsjäger-Regiment 13 | 30 September 1944 | — | — |
| Dieter-Hans Clemm von Hohenberg | Luftwaffe | Hauptmann | Gruppenkommandeur of the II.(K)/Lehrgeschwader 1 | 18 November 1944* | Killed in action 29 June 1944 | — |
| Rudolf Cleve | Luftwaffe | Hauptmann | Chief of the 3./Flak-Regiment 4 (motorized) | 4 May 1944 | — | — |
| Erich Clößner | Heer | Generalleutnant | Commander of the 25. Infanterie-Division | 29 September 1940 | — | — |
| Hans Clüver | Heer | Major of the Reserves | Commander of the II./Grenadier-Regiment 266 | 22 January 1944 | — | — |
| Joachim Coeler | Luftwaffe | Generalmajor | Commander of the 9. Flieger-Division | 12 July 1940 | — | — |
| Erwin Cohrs | Heer | Major | Commander of the II./Panzergrenadier-Regiment 67 | 9 December 1944 | — | — |
| Hans Collani | Waffen-SS | SS-Obersturmbannführer | Commander of the SS-Freiwilligen-Panzergrenadier-Regiment 49 "De Ruyter" (niederländische Nr. 2) | 19 August 1944* | Killed in action 29 July 1944 | — |
| Robert Colli | Heer | Oberst | Commander of Grenadier-Regiment 547 | 19 February 1944 | — | — |
| Johann Condné | Heer | Hauptmann | Leader of the II./Panzergrenadier-Regiment 6 | 5 April 1945 | — | — |
| Dipl.-Ing. Gerhard Conrad | Luftwaffe | Oberst | Geschwaderkommodore of Kampfgeschwader z.b.V. 2 | 24 May 1940 | — | — |
| Hermann Conrad | Heer | Oberfeldwebel | Shock troop leader in the 7./Infanterie-Regiment 330 | 9 July 1941 | — | — |
| Alexander Conrady+ | Heer | Oberstleutnant | Commander of the I./Infanterie-Regiment 118 (motorized) | 17 October 1942 | Awarded 279th Oak Leaves 22 August 1943 | — |
| Paul Conrath+ | Luftwaffe | Oberst | Commander of Flak-Regiment (motorized) "General Göring" | 4 September 1941 | Awarded 276th Oak Leaves 21 August 1943 (Note: According to Scherzer on 22 August 1943.) | |
| Klaus Coracino | Heer | Oberleutnant of the Reserves | Chief of Sturmgeschütz-Begleitkompanie 254 in the I./Grenadier-Regiment 431 (Note: According to Scherzer as chief of Sturmgeschütz-Begleitkompanie 254 in the 254. Infanterie-Division.) | 2 September 1944 | — | — |
| Udo Cordes | Luftwaffe | Leutnant | Pilot in the 9.(Eis)/Kampfgeschwader 3 "Lützow" | 12 June 1943 (Note: According to Scherzer on 25 May 1943.) | — | — |
| [Prof. Dr.] Günter Corßen (Note: The brackets around the professor and doctor title [Prof. Dr.] denotes that the academic title was attained after the Knight's Cross of the Iron Cross was awarded.) | Heer | Hauptmann | Department leader of Panzer-Regiment 39 | 8 February 1943 | — | — |
| Helmut Corts | Luftwaffe | Oberleutnant (Note: According to Scherzer as Leutnant and a battery officer in the 2./Flak-Regiment 64 (motorized).) | Zugführer (platoon leader) in the 2./Flak-Regiment 64 (motorized) | 20 June 1940 | — | — |
| Hans-Detloff von Cossel+ | Heer | Oberleutnant | Leader of the 1./Panzer-Regiment 35 | 8 September 1941 | Awarded 285th Oak Leaves 29 August 1943 | — |
| Georg le Coutre | Luftwaffe | Leutnant | Leader of the 10./Fallschirmjäger-Regiment 6 | 7 February 1945 | — | — |
| Hans Cramer | Heer | Oberstleutnant | Commander of Panzer-Regiment 8 im DAK | 27 June 1941 | — | A man wearing a field cap and military uniform with various military decorations including an Iron Cross displayed at the front of his uniform collar. |
| Heinz Cramer | Luftwaffe | Major | Gruppenkommandeur of the II.(K)/Lehrgeschwader 1 | 18 September 1940 | — | — |
| Wilhelm-Ernst Freiherr von Cramm | Heer | Major | Commander of Divisions-Füsilier-Abteilung 58 | 11 April 1944 | — | — |
| Friedrich Crantz | Heer | Oberleutnant of the Reserves | Chief of the 10./Grenadier-Regiment 416 | 3 March 1943 | — | — |
| Friedrich-Carl Cranz | Heer | Generalleutnant | Commander of the 18. Infanterie-Division (motorized) | 29 June 1940 | — | — |
| Eduard Crasemann+ | Heer | Oberstleutnant | Commander of Artillerie-Regiment 33 (motorized) | 26 December 1941 | Awarded 683rd Oak Leaves 18 December 1944 | |
| Peter-Erich Cremer | Kriegsmarine | Kapitänleutnant | Commander of U-333 | 5 June 1942 | — | — |
| Wilhelm Crinius+ | Luftwaffe | Feldwebel | Pilot in the 3./Jagdgeschwader 53 | 23 September 1942 | Awarded 127th Oak Leaves 23 September 1942 | — |
| Wilhelm Crisolli | Heer | Oberstleutnant | Commander of Schützen-Regiment 8 | 15 July 1941 | — | — |
| Arved Crüger | Luftwaffe | Hauptmann | Staffelkapitän of the 5./Kampfgeschwader 30 (Note: According to Scherzer on 19 June 1940 as Staffelkapitän of the 3./Kampfgeschwader 30.) | 14 June 1940 | — | — |
| Ludwig Crüwell+ | Heer | Generalmajor | Commander of the 11. Panzer-Division | 14 May 1941 | Awarded 34th Oak Leaves 1 September 1941 | Crüwell is seen in profile. He wears a military uniform, along with a cap for desert warfare. His Iron Cross displayed at the front of his shirt collar. |
| Heinz Crusius | Heer | Oberleutnant | Chief of the 4./Infanterie-Regiment 453 | 3 May 1942 | — | — |
| Kurt Cullmann | Heer | Oberfähnrich | Deputy leader of the 2./Divisions-Füsilier-Bataillon 260 | 9 June 1944* | Killed in action 29 March 1944 | — |
| Kurt Cuno | Heer | Oberst | Commander of Panzer-Regiment 39 | 18 January 1942 | — | — |
| Leo Cygan | Heer | Leutnant of the Reserves | Zugführer (platoon leader) in the 1./Pionier-Bataillon 102 | 5 January 1944 | — | — |
| Richard Czekay | Luftwaffe | Hauptmann (Note: According to Scherzer as Oberleutnant and adjutant of the I./Sturzkampfgeschwader 2 "Immelmann".) | Staffelkapitän of the 3./Sturzkampfgeschwader 2 "Immelmann" and adjutant of the I./Schlachtgeschwader 2 | 30 December 1942 | — | — |
| Gerhard Czernik | Luftwaffe | Oberleutnant | Staffelkapitän of the 6./Kampfgeschwader 2 | 16 May 1941 | — | |
| Wilhelm Czorny | Heer | Gefreiter | Machine gun leader in the 2./Panzergrenadier-Regiment "Großdeutschland" (Note: According to Scherzer in the 2.(gepanzert)/Panzergrenadier-Regiment "Großdeutschland".) | 4 October 1944 | — | — |
