= Inspector of Bombers =

Leading position within the High Command of the Luftwaffe of Nazi Germany

- Inspekteur der Kampfflieger
- Emblem of the Luftwaffe in gold

- Longest serving officeholder Generalleutnant Johannes Fink; 21 October 1940 – 31 October 1942
- Luftwaffe
- Member of: Oberkommando der Luftwaffe
- Reports to: Commander-in-Chief of the Luftwaffe
- Formation: January 1940; 86 years ago
- Abolished: 8 May 1945; 81 years ago

Inspector of Bombers (German: Inspekteur der Kampfflieger) was not a rank but a leading position within the High Command of the Luftwaffe (Oberkommando der Luftwaffe), the air force of Nazi Germany. The inspector was responsible for the readiness, training and tactics of the bomber force. It was not an operational command. The senior commander position of this unit was redesignated to General of Bombers (German: General der Kampfflieger) in 1942.

== Inspectors ==
No.	Portrait	Inspector	Took office	Left office	Time in office
Inspekteur der Kampfflieger
1	Paul Schultheiss [de]	Oberst; Paul Schultheiss (1893–1944)	January 1940	October 1940	9 months
2	Johannes Fink	Generalleutnant; Johannes Fink (1895–1981)	21 October 1940	31 October 1942	2 years
General der Kampfflieger
3	Dietrich Peltz	Generalmajor; Dietrich Peltz (1914–2001)	1 January 1943	3 September 1943	8 months
-	Joachim Helbig	Oberstleutnant; Joachim Helbig (1915–1985); Acting	March 1943	August 1943	5 months
4	Walter Marienfeld	Oberst; Walter Marienfeld	February 1944	1 October 1944	8 months
5	Walter Storp	Generalmajor; Walter Storp (1910–1981)	1 October 1944	31 January 1945	3 months
-	Werner Baumbach	Oberst; Werner Baumbach (1916–1953); Acting	November 1944	January 1945	2 months
-	Hans-Henning von Beust	Oberst; Hans-Henning von Beust; Acting	February 1945	May 1945	3 months
