= Joachim Helbig =

German World War II bomber pilot

- Joachim Helbig
- Born: 10 September 1915; Dahlen, Saxony, German Empire
- Died: 5 October 1985 (aged 70); Malente, West Germany
- Military career
- Allegiance: Nazi Germany
- Branch: Luftwaffe
- Service years: 1935–45
- Rank: Oberst
- Commands: LG 1
- Conflicts: World War II: Invasion of Poland; North African Campaign; Italian Campaign; Normandy Campaign; Eastern Front
- Awards: Knight's Cross of the Iron Cross with Oak Leaves and Swords

Joachim Helbig (10 September 1915 – 5 October 1985) was a German bomber pilot during World War II. He joined the Luftwaffe in 1936, and served almost all of his career with Demonstration Wing 1 (Lehrgeschwader 1 (LG 1)). With his unit, he participated in the Invasion of Poland, the Norwegian Campaign, the Battles of the Netherlands, Belgium, France and Britain in 1939–40. For his contributions in these campaigns, Helbig received the Knight's Cross of the Iron Cross in late 1940. He was then transferred to the Mediterranean theatre where he bombed Malta, the British Mediterranean Fleet and flew in support of the Afrika Korps. Helbig received the Knight's Cross of the Iron Cross with Oak Leaves and Swords in late 1942 for the support of Field Marshal Erwin Rommel's 1942 summer offensive.

He was then banned from further combat flying and was assigned to the staff of the General of Bombers, the senior officer responsible for the Luftwaffe's bomber force. In August 1943 the ban was revoked and Helbig was appointed commander of LG 1 which was then operating against the Allied forces in Italy. In June 1944, he and LG 1 were transferred to France after Operation Overlord. In early 1945, LG 1 was transferred to the Eastern Front and Helbig was tasked to destroy the bridges over the Oder. He surrendered to the American forces at the end of the war in May. After the war, Helbig pursued a civilian career; he died in 1985.

== Early life ==
Joachim Helbig was born on 10 September 1915 in Dahlen, Saxony. He volunteered for military service on 1 April 1935 and initially served one year with an artillery regiment. In the fall of 1936, he transferred to the Luftwaffe and entered the Bomber Flying School in Lechfeld. After completing his training as an observer and aerial gunner on 20 April 1937, he was posted as an observer to the Bomber Wing (Kampfgeschwader (KG)) 152 in Schwerin.

== World War II ==
=== Western Europe; Battle of Britain ===
At the beginning of World War II in September 1939, Helbig held the rank of Second Lieutenant and was serving as an observer in a He 111 reconnaissance aircraft of Demonstration Wing 1 (Lehrgeschwader 1 (II./LG 1)) in 1938. He was awarded the Iron Cross 2nd Class following the campaign. Helbig took part in the April 1940 invasion of Norway (Operation Weserübung). As part of II. Gruppe, he flew missions in support of the German ground forces, particularly in the Åndalsnes area. During one of these missions on 2 May, his unit sank the Norwegian hospital ship SS Dronning Maud with heavy losses. (Note: While the ship flew Red Cross flags and had tarpaulins with red crosses stretched across her bridge roof, she was not painted white, nor had the Norwegians notified the Germans of her status as required by the Geneva Conventions.) Following their attack on Dronning Maud, the German aircraft then dropped bombs on the nearby Gratangen Municipality, destroying several houses and killing two civilians. Shortly afterwards, the unit returned to Germany. During the Battle of France later that month, Helbig served as squadron commander of the Fourth Squadron of LG 1, flying both He 111 and Junkers Ju 88 bombers, a position he held until 5 November 1941. While attacking shipping during the Battle of Dunkirk on 1 June, Helbig's Ju 88 was intercepted by Supermarine Spitfires of No. 616 Squadron RAF. They damaged the aircraft and lightly wounded Helbig, but he was able to return to base. For his actions, he was awarded the Iron Cross 1st Class.

Following the defeat of France, Helbig was promoted to captain (Hauptmann) in July and his unit remained in France to participate in the Battle of Britain. On 15 August 1940, Helbig and his squadron, consisting of seven Ju 88s, took off with the primary target of the British airfield at Worthy Down together with other German units. The Germans were intercepted by British fighters and the mission was very costly for 4. Staffel as over half the bombers were shot down by the British or were written off after landing. Helbig was forced to jettison his bombs before reaching the target and return to base, flying on a single engine with wounded crewmen aboard. (Note: Sources disagree about the number of aircraft flown by 4. Staffel as well as the losses inflicted by the British during this mission. Helbig himself, in his account of the mission excerpted in Taghon, claims that the Staffel had seven bombers on the mission and that he was the sole survivor, bringing his heavily damaged aircraft home with two badly wounded crewmen. The Luftwaffe loss records, however, only record three bombers shot down and another written off after landing. And that Helbig's aircraft had only one wounded crewman aboard. Ramsey confirms three bombers crashed on British soil based on wreckage recovered. Mason and Bungay concur on the five of seven aircraft lost, but Mason does not breakdown his loss listing by Staffel or aircraft identification so it is impossible to cross-reference his list and the Luftwaffe records. De Zeng, Stankey and Creek also agree on five aircraft lost during the mission. Bergstrom says that only Helbig's aircraft returned while Schumann says that the Staffel had 32 men taken prisoner, which would mean that the entire crews of eight Ju 88s were captured.) During the battle, Helbig reported that his badly damaged Ju 88 was intercepted by a Spitfire over the English Channel. The RAF pilot did not fire, but instead flew alongside the crippled bomber until the French coast was in sight, waved and flew away. Historian Christer Bergström has suggested that this might have been Pilot Officer Richard Hardy from No. 234 Squadron RAF. As the battle continued, LG 1 mostly switched to bombing cities at night. Helbig was awarded the Knight's Cross of the Iron Cross on 24 November, after having flown 75 combat missions.

=== North African and Mediterranean campaign ===
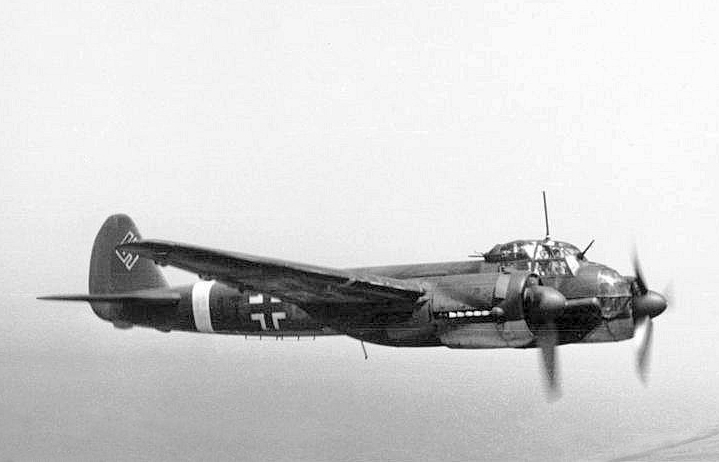
Junkers Ju 88 similar to those flown by Helbig

The Gruppe flew to Sicily in mid-January 1941 and attacked targets in Malta as well as British ships in the Mediterranean. On one of these missions, they damaged the aircraft carrier HMS Illustrious on 16 January while she was docked for repairs in Grand Harbour, Malta. The unit was transferred to Bulgaria in early April in preparation for Operation Marita, the German invasions of Greece and Yugoslavia, where it participated in the bombing of Belgrade, Yugoslavia on 6 April. Shortly afterwards, it returned to Sicily and spent the rest of the campaign on anti-shipping missions near Southern Greece and Crete with occasional ground-attack missions. Two weeks later, on 21 April, II./LG 1 damaged the oil tanker SS British Lord south of Crete and unsuccessfully attacked a British convoy near Malta during Operation Tiger on 11 May.

The unit transferred to Athens on 16 May in preparation for the invasion of Crete (Operation Merkur) and continued its efforts to interdict shipping in Greek waters. It may have damaged the battleship HMS Barham on 27 May as the British were evacuating the island. II./LG 1 remained in the Mediterranean for the rest of the year, attacking targets in Palestine, Egypt and Libya, including long-range missions mining the Suez Canal and various ports at night.

Helbig became Gruppenkommandeur (group commander) of I./LG 1 on 5 November. The Gruppe briefly came under the command of Fliegerführer Afrika on 21 November and assisted III./LG 1 in supporting German ground forces during the British Operation Crusader offensive for five days. He was slightly wounded during a Royal Air Force bombing raid on the airfield at Benina, Libya, on 29 November, as his unit was staging through en route back to Greece. Helbig commanded the unit on operations against the Sidi Barrani–Alexandria rail line on 3 and 4 December. On 10 December the unit flew interdiction operations against the British Army south of Tobruk. Thereafter, the unit flew mine-laying operations off the Libyan coast. On 16 January 1942, Helbig became the 64th recipient of the Knight's Cross of the Iron Cross with Oak Leaves after having completed 210 combat missions.

While on patrol approximately 100 kilometers (62 mi) south of Crete on 11 May, Ju 88s from I./LG 1 detected four British destroyers, HMS Jervis, Kipling, Jackal and Lively. The first wave of 14 Ju 88s from I./LG 1 attacked the destroyers later that afternoon, sank Lively and crippled Jackal. A second wave failed to find the destroyers, but the third wave of seven Ju 88s, led by Helbig, attacked the destroyers with the setting sun behind them. Helbig's aircraft sank Kipling at 32.39°N 26.19°E while Jackal later had to be scuttled. The attack was successful despite the presence of defending Bristol Beaufighters from No. 272 Squadron RAF. In June, British commandos attacked Helbig's unit at their base in Heraklion, Crete, and succeeded in blowing up seven Ju 88s. On 28 September 1942 he was awarded the 20th Knight's Cross of the Iron Cross with Oak Leaves and Swords.

=== Italian campaign and post-war life ===
In January 1943, Helbig was transferred to the staff of the General der Kampfflieger (Commander of Bombers). In March 1943 he was appointed the General der Kampfflieger and was promoted to Oberstleutnant (lieutenant colonel) on 1 September. After numerous difficulties and clashes with his superiors, including Field Marshal Albert Kesselring, he returned to LG 1 as its Geschwaderkommodore (wing commander) on 14 August.

When his Geschwader was transferred to Italy to operate against the Allied beachheads at Anzio and Nettuno in Italy after the landings there (Operation Shingle) on 22 January 1944, Helbig was appointed as the commander of all bomber units in Italy. On the night of 23/24 January, his aircraft sank the destroyer HMS Janus with a torpedo and damaged severely Jervis with a Henschel Hs 293 glider bomb at the cost of 11 aircraft. The Corsica operation was a success and these long-range operations destroyed 23 aircraft and damaged 90.

In June 1944, LG 1 was ordered to transfer to Belgium for air defence during the Allied invasion of France. Helbig formed a combined ground support and reconnaissance battle group as part of the Luftwaffe's operations against the Allied bombing campaign on 10 September 1944. Visiting unit at the Vogelsang Airfield, he was severely wounded by strafing Allied aircraft. Due to his injuries, Helbig had to surrender command of his unit.

In the last weeks of the war in Europe, Helbig commanded a combat unit on the Eastern Front; he surrendered to the American forces on 8 May 1945. After the war he returned to civilian life, becoming the director of the Schultheiss brewery plant in Berlin. Helbing died in Malente on 5 October 1985 following a car accident on vacation in Spain.

== Awards ==
- Medaglia d'Argento al Valor Militare
- Iron Cross (1939) 2nd class (16 September 1939) & 1st class (20 June 1940)
- Ehrenpokal der Luftwaffe (6 October 1940)
- Knight's Cross of the Iron Cross with Oak Leaves and Swords
  - Knight's Cross on 24 November 1940 as Hauptmann and Staffelkapitän of the 4.(K)/Lehrgeschwader 1
  - 64th Oak Leaves on 16 January 1942 as Hauptmann and Gruppenkommandeur of the I.(K)/Lehrgeschwader 1
  - 20th Swords on 28 September 1942 as Hauptmann and Gruppenkommandeur of the I.(K)/Lehrgeschwader 1

== Bibliography ==
- Berger, Florian (1999). Mit Eichenlaub und Schwertern. Die höchstdekorierten Soldaten des Zweiten Weltkrieges [With Oak Leaves and Swords. The Highest Decorated Soldiers of the Second World War] (in German). Vienna, Austria: Selbstverlag Florian Berger. ISBN 978-3-9501307-0-6.
- Bergström, Christer (2015). The Battle of Britain: An Epic Conflict Revisited. Casemate: Oxford. ISBN 978-1612-00347-4.
- Brütting, Georg (1974). Das waren die deutschen Kampfflieger-Asse – 1939–1945 [Those were the German Bomber Aces – 1939–1945] (in German). Motorbuch. ISBN 978-3-87943-345-2.
- Bungay, Stephen (2000). The Most Dangerous Enemy: A History of the Battle of Britain. London: Aurom Press. ISBN 978-1-85410-801-2.
- Cornwell, Peter D. (2008). The Battle of France: Then and Now. Old Harlow, UK: After the Battle. ISBN 1-870067-65-7.
- De Zeng, H.L.; Stankey, D.G.; Creek, E.J (2008). Bomber Units of the Luftwaffe 1933–1945; A Reference Source, Volume 2. Ian Allan Publishing. ISBN 978-1-903223-87-1.
- Goss, Chris (2007). Sea Eagles Volume Two: Luftwaffe Anti-Shipping Units 1942–45. Burgess Hill: Classic Publications. ISBN 978-1-9032-2356-7.
- Haarr, Geirr H. (2010). The Battle for Norway, April-June 1940. Barnsley: Seaforth. ISBN 978-1-84832-057-4.
- Hafsten, Bjørn; Ulf Larsstuvold; Bjørn Olsen; Sten Stenersen (1991). Flyalarm – luftkrigen over Norge 1939–1945 (in Norwegian) (1st ed.). Oslo: Sem og Stenersen AS. ISBN 82-7046-058-3.
- Hooton, E. R. (1997). Eagle in Flames: The Fall of the Luftwaffe. London: Arms & Armour Press. ISBN 978-1-85409-343-1.
- Langtree, Charles (2002). The Kelly's: British J, K, and N Class Destroyers of World War II. Annapolis, Maryland: Naval Institute Press. ISBN 1-55750-422-9.
- MacLean, French L (2007). Luftwaffe Efficiency & Promotion Reports: For the Knight's Cross Winners. Atglen, Pennsylvania: Schiffer Military History. ISBN 978-0-7643-2657-8.
- Mason, Francis (1969). Battle Over Britain. McWhirter Twins, London. ISBN 978-0-901928-00-9
- Ramsey, Winston G., ed. (2000). The Battle of Britain: Then and Now (7th impression ed.). London: Battle of Britain Prints International. ISBN 0-900913-46-0.
- Scherzer, Veit (2007). Die Ritterkreuzträger 1939–1945 Die Inhaber des Ritterkreuzes des Eisernen Kreuzes 1939 von Heer, Luftwaffe, Kriegsmarine, Waffen-SS, Volkssturm sowie mit Deutschland verbündeter Streitkräfte nach den Unterlagen des Bundesarchives [The Knight's Cross Bearers 1939–1945 The Holders of the Knight's Cross of the Iron Cross 1939 by Army, Air Force, Navy, Waffen-SS, Volkssturm and Allied Forces with Germany According to the Documents of the Federal Archives] (in German). Jena, Germany: Scherzers Militaer-Verlag. ISBN 978-3-938845-17-2.
- Schumann, Ralf (2007). Die Ritterkreuzträger 1939–1945 des LG 1 [The Knight's Cross Bearers 1939–1945 of LG 1] (in German). Zweibrücken, Germany: VDM Heinz Nickel. ISBN 978-3-86619-013-9.
- Shores, Christopher; et al. (1991). Fledgling Eagles. London: Grub Street. ISBN 0-948817-42-9.
- Shores, Christopher; Cull, Brian; Malizia, Nicola (1987). Air War for Yugoslavia, Greece and Crete: 1940-41. London: Grub Street. ISBN 0-948817-07-0.
- Stockert, Peter (1996). Die Eichenlaubträger 1939–1945 Band 1 [The Oak Leaves Bearers 1939–1945 Volume 1] (in German). Bad Friedrichshall, Germany: Friedrichshaller Rundblick. ISBN 978-3-9802222-7-3.
- Taghon, Peter (2004a). Die Geschichte des Lehrgeschwaders 1—Band 1—1936 – 1942 [The History of Lehrgeschwader 1—Volume 1—1936 – 1942] (in German). Zweibrücken, Germany: VDM Heinz Nickel. ISBN 978-3-925480-85-0.
- Taghon, Peter (2004b). Die Geschichte des Lehrgeschwaders 1—Band 2—1942 – 1945 [The History of Lehrgeschwader 1—Volume 2—1942 – 1945] (in German). Zweibrücken, Germany: VDM Heinz Nickel. ISBN 978-3-925480-88-1.
- Thomas, Franz (1997). Die Eichenlaubträger 1939–1945 Band 1: A–K [The Oak Leaves Bearers 1939–1945 Volume 1: A–K] (in German). Osnabrück, Germany: Biblio-Verlag. ISBN 978-3-7648-2299-6.
- Weal, John (2009). Junkers Ju 88 Kampfgeschwader in North Africa and the Mediterranean. Oxford, UK: Osprey Publishing. ISBN 978-1-84603-888-4.

Military offices
Preceded by Oberstleutnant Hans-Werner Freiherr von Buchholtz	Geschwaderkommodore of Lehrgeschwader 1; 14 August 1943 – 2 March 1945	Succeeded by Major Richard Czekay
