= Stefan Fröhlich (German general) =

Austrian general during World War II

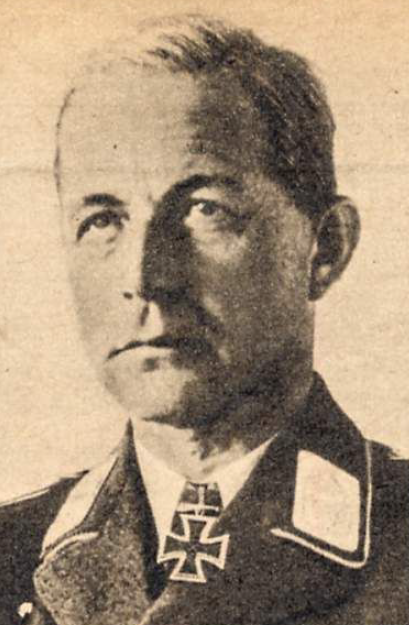
- Born: 7 October 1889; Orschowa, Austria-Hungary
- Died: 2 October 1978 (aged 88); Duisburg, North Rhine-Westphalia, West Germany
- Military career
- Allegiance: Austria-Hungary; First Austrian Republic; Nazi Germany
- Branch: Common Army; Imperial and Royal Army; Bundesheer; Luftwaffe
- Service years: 1908–1945
- Rank: General der Flieger
- Commands: Kampfgeschwader 76; Fliegerführer Afrika; 2. Flieger-Division; 9th Air Corps; 2nd Air Corps; Fliegerkorps 10
- Conflicts: World War I World War II: Annexation of the Sudetenland; Invasion of Poland; Battle of the Bzura; Battle of Belgium; Battle of France; Battle of Britain; North African Campaign; Defense of the Reich
- Awards: Knight's Cross of the Iron Cross

Stefan Fröhlich (7 October 1889 – 2 October 1978) was an Austrian officer and German general during World War II. He was a recipient of the Knight's Cross of the Iron Cross of Nazi Germany.

== Life ==
Fröhlich at age 15 enlisted in the Austro-Hungarian army in the pioneer cadet school. He entered the Imperial and Royal Sapper Battalion 1 as a Fähnrich on 18 August 1908 and was commissioned as 2nd Lieutenant on 1 May 1911.

At the onset of the First World War, he was a 1st Lieutenant (promoted on 1 August 1914) and served predominantly on the Italian Front. Following the end of hostilities, Fröhlich remained in the Austrian army, eventually serving in the Vienna Federal Ministry for the Army as a clerk for engineering.

In 1933 he took part in a pilot training course and was subsequently transferred to the "air raid command". In December 1937, he became the commandant of the newly established flying school regiment at the Zeltweg Air Base. After the Anschluss of Austria, he transferred over to the Luftwaffe as a Lieutenant Colonel (promoted on 28 December 1935) and later received German rank seniority (RDA) from 1 July 1935. On 1 April 1939, he was promoted to Oberst (Colonel) with rank seniority (RDA) from 1 March 1938, later receiving rank seniority (RDA) from 1 August 1937.

=== WWII ===
On 26 June 1940, he was promoted to Generalmajor (Major General) with effect from 1 July 1940, in January 1941, he received rank seniority (RDA) from 1 December 1939. On 1 January 1942, he was promoted to Generalleutnant (Lieutenant General) and on 1 July 1943 to General der Flieger.

During the Second World War, he served on all major fronts and eventually retired on April 30, 1945, eight days prior to the end of hostilities.

== Awards and decorations ==
- Karl Troop Cross
- Military Merit Medal (Austria-Hungary) in Bronze and Silver
- Military Merit Cross (Austria-Hungary), III. Class with War decoration and Swords
- Iron Cross (1914), 2nd Class
- Silver Decoration of Honour for Services to the Republic of Austria
- War Commemorative Medal (Austria)
- Golden Decoration of Honour for Services to the Republic of Austria
- Honour Cross of the World War 1914/1918 with Swords
- Observer Badge (Luftwaffe)
- Sudetenland Medal
- 1914 Clasp to the Iron Cross (1939), 2nd Class
- Iron Cross (1939), 1st Class
- Medal of Military Valor in Silver
- Commemorative medal of the Italian-German campaign in Africa
- Africa Cuff Title
- German Cross in Gold (11 May 1942)
- Knight's Cross of the Iron Cross on 4 July 1940 as Generalmajor and commander of Kampfgeschwader 76

Military offices
Preceded by Oberst Paul Schultheiss	Commander of Kampfgeschwader 76; 17 November 1939 – 26 February 1941	Succeeded by Oberst Dr. Ing. Ernst Bormann
Preceded by None	Commander of Fliegerführer Afrika; 24 February 1941 – 10 April 1942	Succeeded by General Otto Hoffmann von Waldau
Preceded by None	Commander of 2. Flieger-Division; 12 April 1942 – 1 November 1942	Succeeded by General der Flieger Johannes Fink
Preceded by General der Flieger Joachim Coeler	Commander of IX. Fliegerkorps; 29 December 1942 – 3 September 1943	Succeeded by Generalmajor Dietrich Peltz
Preceded by General der Flieger Martin Fiebig	Commander of Luftwaffenkommando Südost; 1 September – 22 October 1944	Succeeded by None
Preceded by General der Flieger Johannes Fink	Commander of II. Fliegerkorps; January 1945 – 1 February 1945	Succeeded by General der Flieger Martin Fiebig
Preceded by General der Flieger Hans-Georg von Seidel	Commander of Luftflotte 10; 27 February 1945 – 30 April 1945	Succeeded by None
