= 9th Air Corps =

IX. Fliegerkorps German 9th Air Corps
- Flag of a commanding general of a Fliegerkorps
- Active: November 1940 – May 1945
- Country: Nazi Germany
- Branch: Luftwaffe
- Size: Corps

IX. Fliegerkorps (9th Air Corps) was formed in November 1940 in Jever from the 9. Flieger-Division and was redesignated as IX. Fliegerkorps (J)—the suffix "J" stands for Jagd (fighter aircraft)—on 13 November 1944. The Corps at the time was leading numerous Kampfgeschwader which were converting to fighter aircraft. The Corps was renamed again on 26 January 1945, this time to IX. (J) Fliegerkorps.

== Commanding officers ==
- General der Flieger Joachim Coeler, 16 October 1940 – 29 December 1942
- General Stefan Fröhlich, 29 December 1942 – 3 September 1943
- Generalmajor Dietrich Peltz, 4 September 1943 – 8 May 1945
