= HMS Kipling =

Destroyer of the Royal Navy

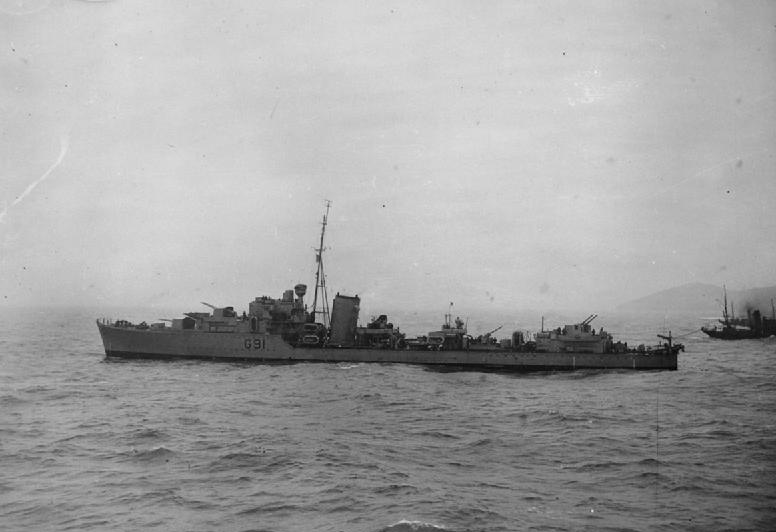

History

United Kingdom
- Name: HMS Kipling
- Builder: Yarrow, Scotstoun
- Laid down: 20 October 1937
- Launched: 19 January 1939
- Commissioned: 12 December 1939
- Identification: Pennant number: F91
- Fate: Sunk on 11 May 1942, by Luftwaffe bombers at 32°23′24″N 26°11′24″E

General characteristics (as built)
- Class & type: K-class destroyer
- Displacement: 1,690 long tons (1,720 t) (standard); 2,330 long tons (2,370 t) (deep load)
- Length: 356 ft 6 in (108.66 m) o/a
- Beam: 35 ft 9 in (10.90 m)
- Draught: 12 ft 6 in (3.81 m) (deep)
- Installed power: 44,000 shp (33,000 kW); 2 × Admiralty 3-drum boilers
- Propulsion: 2 × shafts; 2 × geared steam turbines
- Speed: 36 knots (67 km/h; 41 mph)
- Range: 5,500 nmi (10,200 km; 6,300 mi) at 15 knots (28 km/h; 17 mph)
- Complement: 183 (218 for flotilla leaders)
- Sensors & processing systems: ASDIC
- Armament: 3 × twin 4.7 in (120 mm) guns; 1 × quadruple 2 pdr (40 mm (1.6 in) AA guns; 2 × quadruple 0.5 in (12.7 mm) anti-aircraft machineguns; 2 × quintuple 21 in (533 mm) torpedo tubes; 1 × rack, 2 × throwers for depth charges

HMS Kipling (F91) was a K-class destroyer built for the Royal Navy during the 1930s.

== Description ==
The K-class destroyers were repeats of the preceding J class, except that they were not fitted for minesweeping gear. They displaced 1,690 long tons (1,720 t) at standard load and 2,330 long tons (2,370 t) at deep load. The ships had an overall length of 339 feet 6 inches (103.5 m), a beam of 35 feet (10.7 m) and a draught of 9 feet (2.7 m). They were powered by two Parsons geared steam turbines, each driving one propeller shaft, using steam provided by two Admiralty three-drum boilers. The turbines developed a total of 40,000 shaft horsepower (30,000 kW) and gave a maximum speed of 36 knots (67 km/h; 41 mph). The ships carried a maximum of 484 long tons (492 t) of fuel oil that gave them a range of 5,500 nautical miles (10,200 km; 6,300 mi) at 15 knots (28 km/h; 17 mph). The ships' complement was 183 officers and men.

The ships were armed with six 4.7-inch (120 mm) Mark XII guns in twin mounts, two superfiring in front of the bridge and one aft of the superstructure. For anti-aircraft (AA) defence, they had one quadruple mount for 2-pounder "pom-pom" guns and two quadruple mounts for the 0.5 inch Vickers Mark III anti-aircraft machinegun. The K-class ships were fitted with two above-water quintuple mounts for 21-inch (533 mm) torpedoes. The ship was fitted with two depth charge throwers and one rack for 20 depth charges.

== Construction and career ==
HMS Kipling, named after the author and poet Rudyard Kipling, was laid down by Yarrow, Scotstoun on 26 October 1937, and was launched on 19 January 1939, by Elsie Bambridge, Kipling's daughter. The ship was completed on 22 December 1939.

After working up the ship's crew and a period of defect rectification at the Barclay Curle shipyard on the Clyde, Kipling joined the 5th Destroyer Flotilla of the Home Fleet on 4 February 1940.

On 11 October 1940, Kipling, along with another six destroyers, escorted the battleship HMS Renown to bombard the French port of Cherbourg.

At dawn on 23 May 1941 the destroyers HMS Kelly and HMS Kashmir were retiring at full speed round the west of Crete. After surviving two heavy air attacks they were overtaken at 7.55 a.m. by a formation of twenty-four dive-bombers. Both ships were quickly sunk, with a loss of 210 lives. Fortunately the destroyer Kipling was near by, and, despite continuous bombing, rescued from the sea 279 officers and men, including Lord Louis Mountbatten, while she herself remained unscathed. Next morning, while still fifty miles away from Alexandria, and crowded from stem to stern with men, she ran completely out of fuel, but was safely met and towed in.

On 17 December 1941, she was lightly damaged by splinters from a 203 mm round from the Italian cruiser Gorizia during the First Battle of Sirte, according to Italian reports The British assessment concluded instead that Kipling was hit by near-misses from 320 mm shells fired by the battleships Andrea Doria and Giulio Cesare. Her wireless aerials were knocked down, her structure, hull and attached boats holed. One crewmember was killed in action. On 28 December 1941 Kipling sank the German submarine U-75.

=== Sinking ===
Kipling was attacked by German Ju 88 bombers of Lehrgeschwader 1 north-west of Mersa Matruh in Egypt on 11 May 1942 and sunk by Joachim Helbig. 29 of her crew were killed and 221 men were rescued.
