= Joachim Coeler =

German Luftwaffe general (1891–1955)

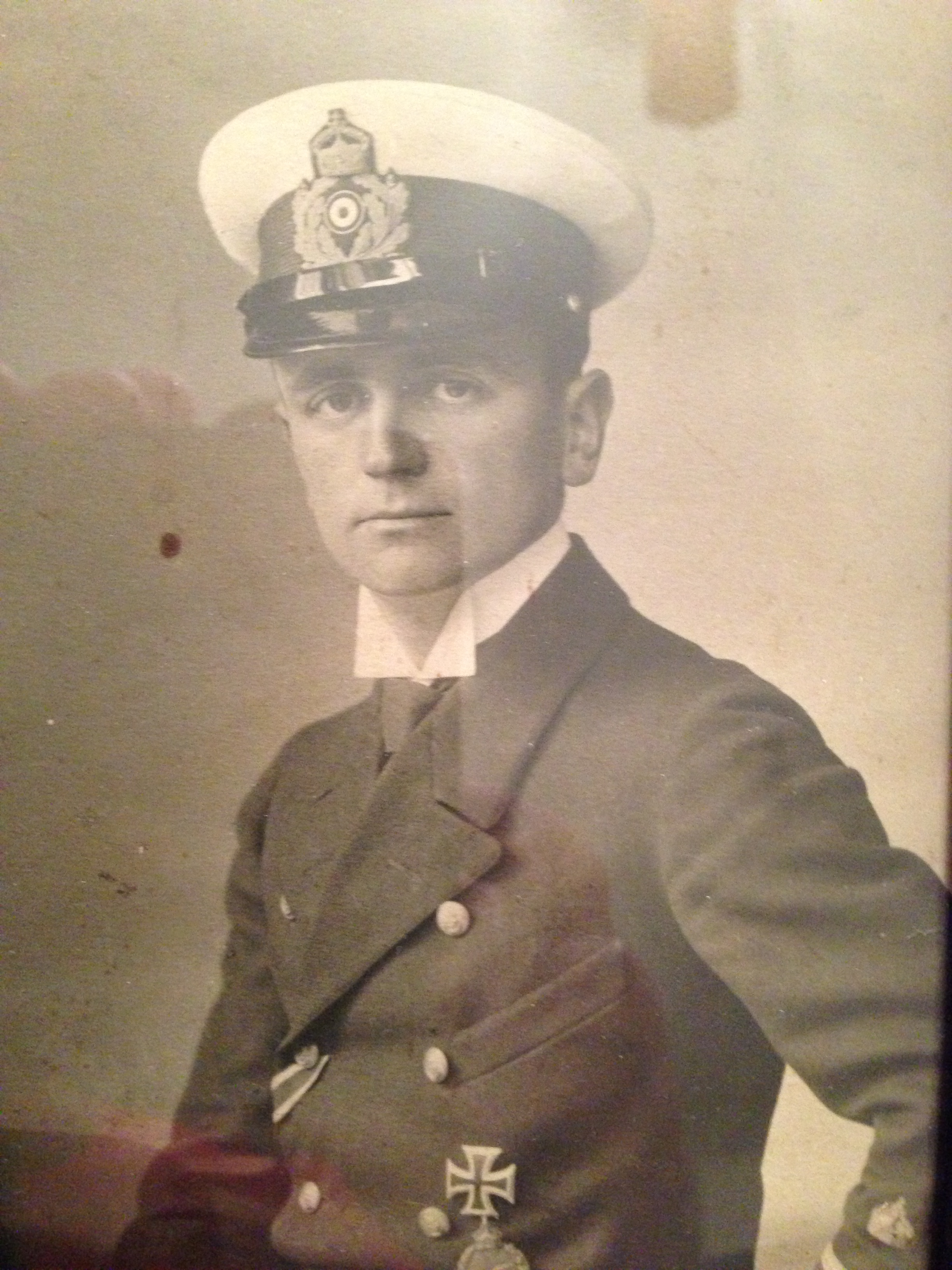
- Born: 1 June 1891; Posen, German Empire
- Died: 14 May 1955 (aged 63); Garmisch-Partenkirchen, Germany
- Military career
- Allegiance: German Empire; Weimar Republic; Nazi Germany
- Branch: Luftwaffe (1934–45)
- Rank: General der Flieger
- Commands: 9th Air Division; 9th Air Corps; 14th Air Corps
- Conflicts: World War II
- Awards: Knight's Cross of the Iron Cross

Joachim Coeler (1 June 1891 – 14 May 1955) was a German general during World War II. He was a recipient of the German Knight's Cross of the Iron Cross, which was awarded for bravery, or other meritorious service.

== Awards ==
- Knight's Cross of the Iron Cross on 12 July 1940 as Generalmajor and commander of 9. Flieger-Division

Military offices
Preceded by None	Commander of 9. Flieger-Division; 1 February 1940 – November 1940	Succeeded by Redesignated IX. Fliegerkorps
Preceded by Previously 9. Flieger-Division	Commander of IX. Fliegerkorps; November 1940 - 29 December 1942	Succeeded by General der Flieger Stefan Fröhlich
