= Alfred Bülowius =

Nazi general (1892–1968)

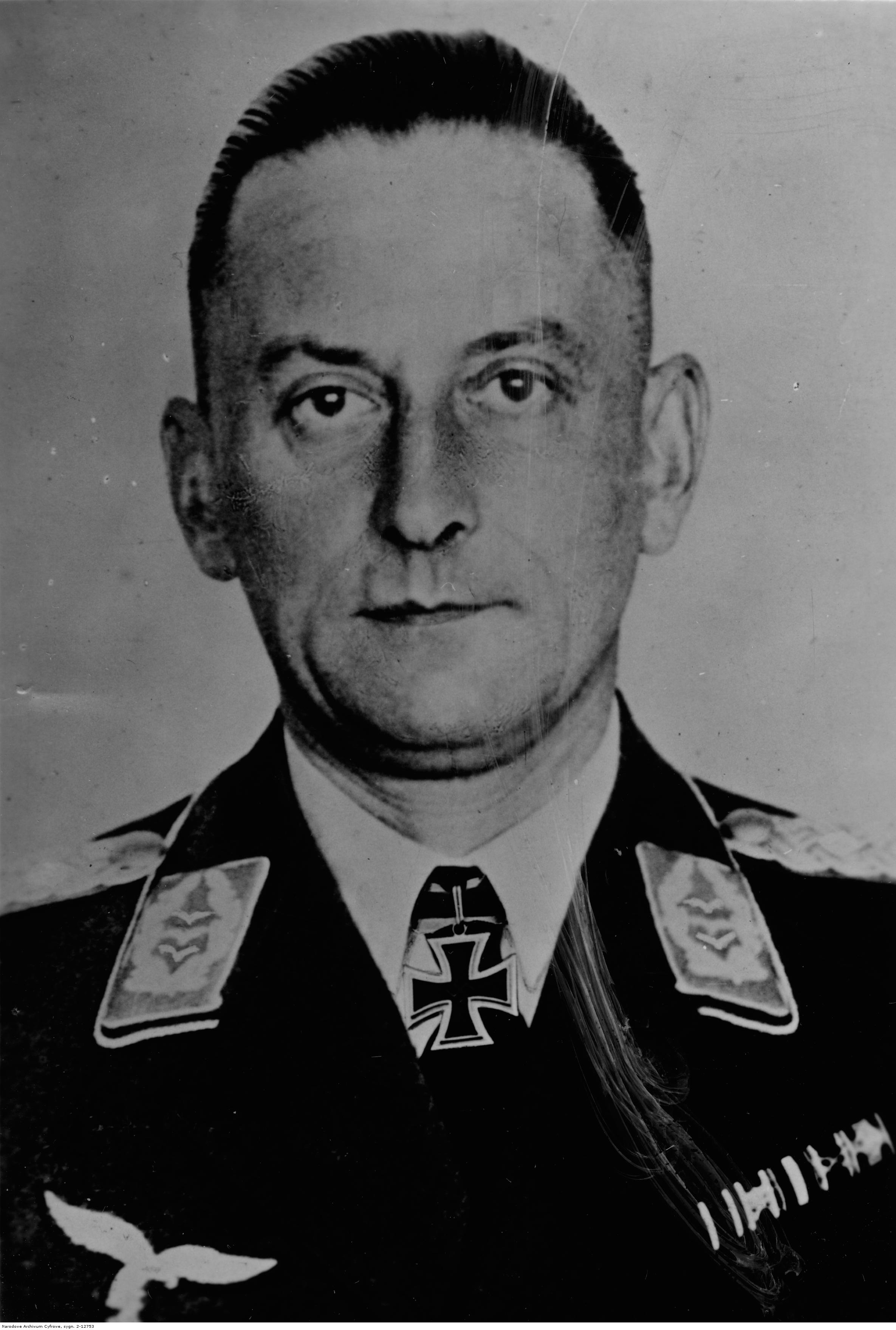
- Born: 14 January 1892; Königsberg, East Prussia
- Died: 9 August 1968 (aged 76); Detmold
- Military career
- Allegiance: German Empire; Weimar Republic; Nazi Germany
- Branch: Luftwaffe
- Service years: 1911–1945
- Rank: General der Flieger
- Commands: Lehrgeschwader 1; 1. Flieger-Division
- Conflicts: World War I World War II
- Awards: Knight's Cross of the Iron Cross

Alfred Bülowius was a German general during World War II. He was a recipient of the Knight's Cross of the Iron Cross of Nazi Germany.

== Awards ==
- Knight's Cross of the Iron Cross on 4 July 1940 as Oberst and Geschwaderkommodore of (K)Lehrgeschwader 1 (Note: According to Scherzer as Geschwaderkommodore of Lehrgeschwader 1.)
- German Cross in Cross in Gold on 9 December 1942 as Generalmajor in the Flieger-Division 1

== Notes ==
Military offices
Preceded by Oberst Dr. Robert Knauss	Commander of Lehrgeschwader 1; 17 November 1939 – 21 October 1940	Succeeded by Oberst Friedrich Karl Knust
Preceded by Generalleutnant Hermann Plocher	Commander of 1. Flieger-Division; 1 November 1942 – 25 June 1943	Succeeded by Generalmajor Otto Zech
Preceded by Generalleutnant Martin Harlinghausen	Commander of II. Fliegerkorps; 26 June 1943 – 30 June 1944	Succeeded by Generalleutant Kurt Kleinrath
Preceded by Generleutnant Werner Junck	Commander of II. Jagdkorps; 1 July 1944 – 15 October 1944	Succeeded by Generalmajor Dietrich Peltz
Preceded by General der Flieger Kuno Heribert Fütterer	Commander of Luftgau-Kommando XV; 22 January 1945 – 2 February 1945	Succeeded by disbanded
