= 2nd Air Corps =

II. Fliegerkorps German 2nd Air Corps
- Flag of a commanding general of a Fliegerkorps
- Active: 11 October 1939 – April 1945
- Country: Nazi Germany
- Branch: Luftwaffe

Commanders
- Notable commanders: Bruno Loerzer

2nd Air Corps (II. Fliegerkorps) was formed on 11 October 1939 in Frankfurt am Main from the 2. Flieger-Division. During Operation Barbarossa and from 22 June to 12 November 1941, the Corps flew over 40,000 day and night sorties, dropping 23,150 tons of bombs and claiming 3,826 Soviet aircraft destroyed as well as 789 tanks, 614 artillery pieces, 14,339 vehicles, 240 enemy field positions, 33 bunkers, 159 trains and 304 locomotives along with relentless attacks on enemy troop concentrations and logistical choke-points.

The Corps was relocated to the Mediterranean theatre of operations on 15 November 1941. The Corps was merged with the Feldluftgau XXX on 29 August 1944 and renamed Kommandierender General der Deutschen Luftwaffe Nordbalkan (commanding general of the German Luftwaffe northern Balkans). In November 1944 the corps was again renamed II. Fliegerkorps and redesignated Luftwaffenkommando Nordost on 2 April 1945.

== Commanding officers ==
- Generaloberst Bruno Loerzer, 11 October 1939 – 23 February 1943
- Generalleutnant Martin Harlinghausen, 23 February 1943 – 12 June 1943
- General Alfred Bülowius, 26 June 1943 – 30 June 1944
- Generalleutant Kurt Kleinrath, 1 July 1944 – 31 August 1944 (Referred to as Kommandierender General der Deutschen Luftwaffe Nordbalkan, 29 August 1944 – November 1944)
- General Johannes Fink, 1 December 1944 – January 1945
- General Stefan Fröhlich, January 1945 – 1 February 1945
- General Martin Fiebig, 1 February 1945 – 12 April 1945

== See also ==
- Luftwaffe Organization
