= Fliegerführer Afrika =

Division of the German Luftwaffe in the Second World War

- Active: 1941–1943
- Country: Nazi Germany
- Branch: Luftwaffe
- Type: Air force
- Role: Aerial warfare Close air support
- Size: Air Fleet
- Engagements: World War II

Commanders
- Notable commanders: Stefan Fröhlich; Otto Hoffmann von Waldau

Fliegerführer Afrika was part of Luftflotte 2 (Air Fleet 2), one of the primary divisions of the German Luftwaffe in the Second World War. It operated in the Mediterranean and Libya from 1941–1942. The commanders were Generalmajor Stefan Fröhlich and Generalleutnant Otto Hoffmann von Waldau, who led the German air support to the German Afrika Korps campaign during the winter of 1941–1942.

The aircraft flown by these commanders were a He 111 P-4 (VG+ES), fully equipped (armed with 5 × MG 15 and 1 × MG 17, capacity to load 1,000 kg (2,200 lb) of bombs in belly and another 1,000 kg (2,200 lb) under the wings, also exterior fuel tanks).

== Commanding officers ==
- Generalmajor Stefan Fröhlich 24 February 1941 – 10 April 1942
- Generlmajor Theo Osterkamp (acting), April 1942
- General der Flieger Otto Hoffmann von Waldau, 12 April – 30 August 1942
- General der Flieger Hans Seidemann, 30 August 1942 – 31 January 1943
- Generalmajor Walter Hagen, 1 February 1943 – February 1943

== Order of battle ==
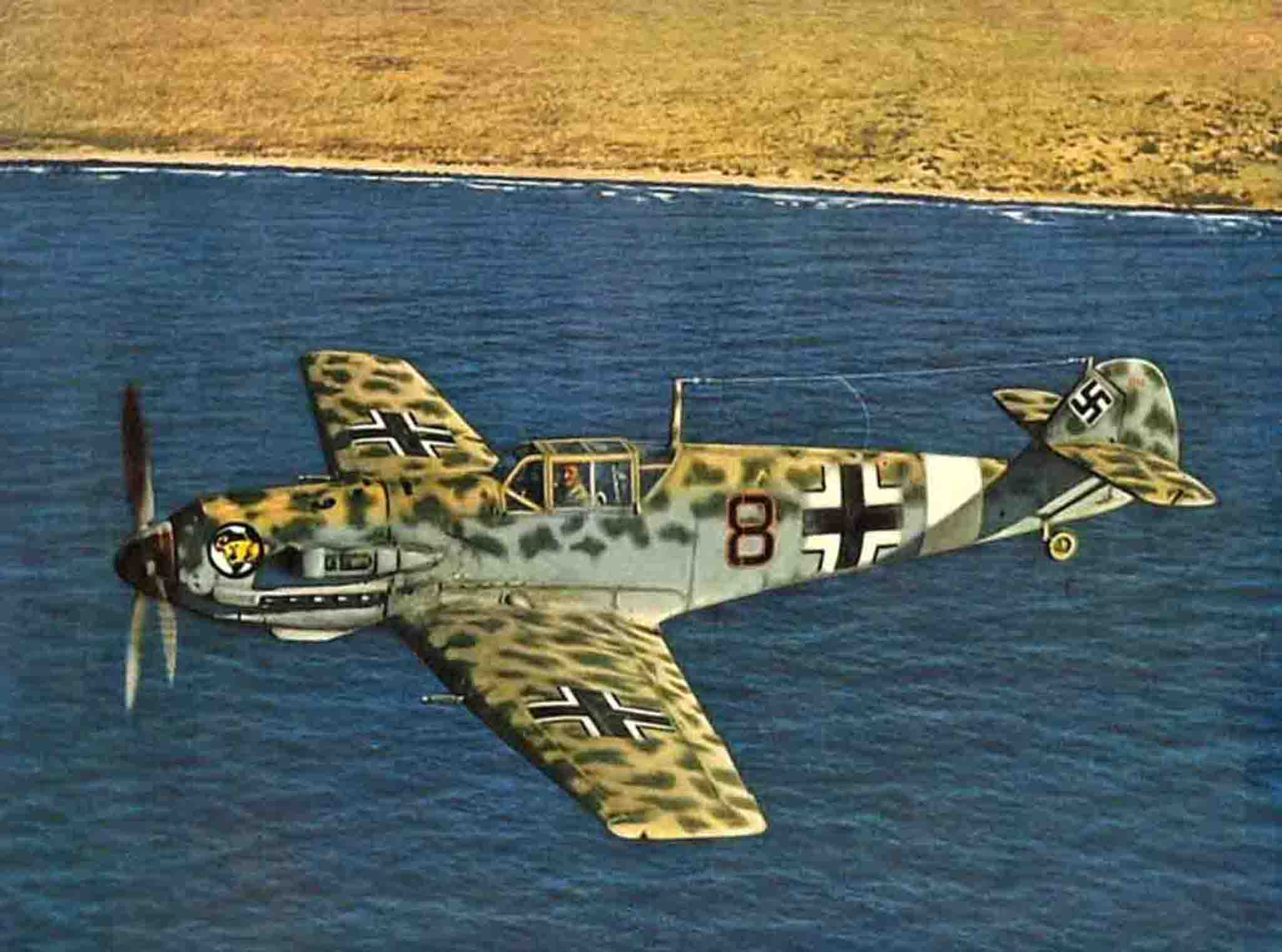
A German Messerschmitt Bf 109E-4/Trop of Jagdgeschwader 27 (27th Fighter Wing) in flight, off the North African coast in the summer of 1941.

=== Luftflotte 2 (1941–42) ===
- Fliegerkorps II
- Korpskette X.Fliegerkorps Afrika
  - JagdKommando Kreta
- Fliegerführer Afrika (Ägyptenfeldzug)
  - Ramcke Parachute Brigade
  - Brigade Hermann Göring
  - Kampfgruppe Schmid
  - Luftwaffe Kommando Südost
    - Luftgau Afrika
    - Koluft Libyen
    - 2.(H)/14
  - II Seenot-Dienstführer
    - 15. Seenotkommando (Bengasi)
    - 16. Seenotkommando (Derna)
    - Seenotkommando (Tripoli)
  - II Sanitäts-Flugbereitschaft Bengasi

=== Luftflotte 2 (1942–43) ===
- Fliegerführer Afrika (Libyen-Tunesien)
  - Fliegerführer Tunis
    - Fliegerkorps Tunis
      - Verbindungsstaffel und Flugbereitschaft der Fliegerkorps Tunis
      - Fliegerführer 1 (Nord)
      - Fliegerführer 2 (Mitte)
      - Fliegerführer 3 (Süd)
      - Fliegerführer Gabes
- General der Deutschen Luftwaffe beim Oberkommand der Kgl. Ital. Luftwaffe (Italuft)
  - V Squadra Aerea (Italian 5th Air Fleet)
    - Bataglione Paracadutisti Libiche Fanti dell'Aria
    - Bataglione Paracadutisti Folgore
    - Commando Aeronautica Tripolitana
    - Settore Centrale Cirenaica
    - Settore Est Fuka (Egypt)
- Deutsch-Italienische Panzerarmee/Armata Corazzata Italo-Tedesca (Flak Div.) Kommando (Anti-Air)
