= Lehrgeschwader 1 =

Luftwaffe multi-purpose unit during World War II

- Active: 1936–45
- Country: Nazi Germany
- Branch: Luftwaffe
- Type: Multi-purpose squadron
- Role: Tactical and direct ground support.
- Size: Air Force wing
- Engagements: Polish Campaign; German invasion of Denmark; Norwegian Campaign; Battle of the Netherlands; Battle of Belgium; Battle of France; Battle of Britain; German invasion of Yugoslavia; Battle of Greece; Battle of Crete; Battle of the Mediterranean; North African campaign Eastern Front; Western Front; Battle of Normandy; Western Allied invasion of Germany

Insignia
- Identification symbol: Geschwaderkennung of L1

Lehrgeschwader 1 (LG 1) (Demonstration Wing 1) formerly Lehrgeschwader Greifswald was a Luftwaffe multi-purpose unit during World War II, operating fighter, bomber and dive-bomber Gruppen. The unit was formed in July 1936 and operated the Messerschmitt Bf 109, Messerschmitt Bf 110, Dornier Do 17, Heinkel He 111, Junkers Ju 88 and Junkers Ju 87.

== History ==
The unit was created to control the Lehrgruppe in the Luftwaffe. Stab/LG 1 was formed in July 1936, and on 1 April 1937 the Stab Gruppe was officially created along with I.(leichte Jagd), II.(schwere Jagd), III.(Kampf) and IV.(Stuka) Gruppen.

== War Time Service ==
=== Invasion of Poland ===
On 25/26 August 1939 the unit mobilised. Assigned to Luftflotte 2, the Geschwader suffered light losses. I.(Zerstörer)/LG 1 lost only three Bf 110s in September. II./LG also took part. Operating He 111s the Gruppe began operations with 39 He 111s (34 operational), and struck at targets in and around Warsaw. The unit also undertook naval strike missions against Royal Navy vessels off the Norwegian coast on 6 October. III./LG 1 also took part, committing 39 He 111s to the battle. Exact losses are unknown, but light. IV.(Stuka) unit, also began its military operations over Poland. Equipped with the Ju 87 Stuka, the Gruppe supported the 11.Armee until withdrawn from operations on 29 September. During the campaign, the unit was transferred to Luftflotte 1.

=== The Invasions of Denmark and Norway ===
I.(K)/LG 1 undertook some armed reconnaissance missions along the Norwegian coast in late April 1940, without suffering casualties. The unit reported three losses. Whether these losses were inflicted as a result of enemy action is unknown. II./LG 1 carried out Maritime interdiction missions. On 1 May 1940, the unit bombed and sunk the Norwegian hospital ship Dronning Maud.

=== France and the Low Countries ===
The Geschwader lost 55 aircraft in the battle, 50 of them in combat. LG 1 records reveal the unit claimed seven Allied ships sunk and 23 damaged, along with 19 Allied aircraft shot down in aerial combat. I.(K)/LG 1 began the campaign with 30 He 111s, of which 22 were combat ready. The Gruppe took part in the Battle of Dunkirk, and spent the majority of its time heavily engaged with Allied Naval forces. II./LG 1, operating under Luftflotte 2, was tasked with direct ground support, Air interdiction, and logistical strikes against the enemy. Operating with 18 of its 26 He 111s at the start of the campaign, it hit the French airfields at Lille on 10 May. On 12 May a raid against Vlissingen harbour cost II. Gruppe two Heinkels. The Gruppe also took part in the Battle of Hannut, attacking Allied positions in Belgium, losing one He 111. The unit were withdrawn from the front-line for five days to convert to the Ju 88. During further operations against Allied rail targets, a further loss, a single Ju 88, was sustained on 20 May in the Amiens area. II. Gruppe was tasked the missions against Naval forces until the end of the Dunkirk evacuation. Several missions against Ostend and Dunkirk's harbours were flown from 25–31 May. This particular unit also took part in Unternehmen Paula, a 1,000 aircraft assault on French airfields in and around Paris on 2 June 1940, without loss. Missions over the Loire Valley continued until 22 June 1940. III. Gruppe also participated . Committing 12 He 111s and 37 Ju 88s it supported II. Gruppe and its operations. IV.(Stuka)/LG 1 undertook ground attack operations with 37 Ju 87 Bs, without being involved in any notable actions. V.(Zerstorer)/LG 1's responsibility was escort duties. Equipped with 33 Bf 110 Ds, the unit lost 8 Bf 110s from 10 May to 16 June 1940, when it was withdrawn for rest and refitting.

=== Air Offensive over Britain ===
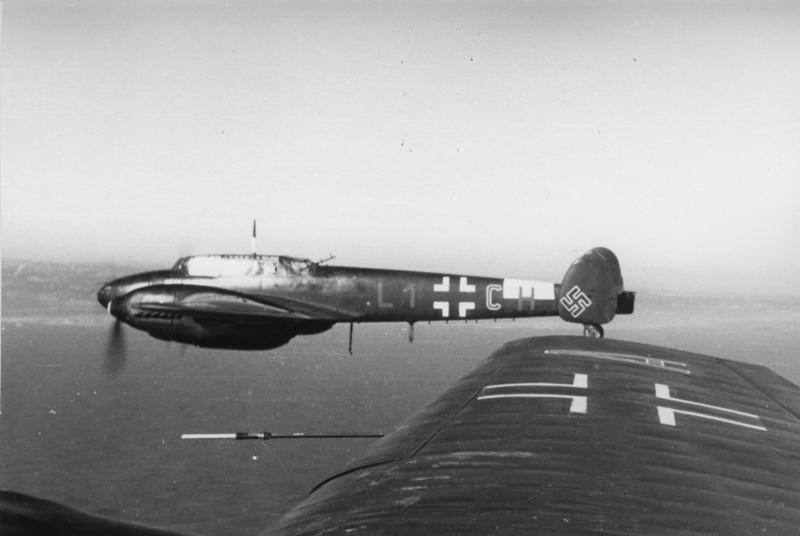
Bf 110Cs of 1.Staffel/LG 1. during the summer of 1940

An attack on 15 August by 12 Ju 88As of I//LG 1 against RAF Middle Wallop destroyed several Spitfires, but the unit lost five aircraft to defending fighters. The Geschwader suffered a cripplingly high loss rate during the battle. From 8 July 1940 to December 1940, LG 1 lost 94 aircraft, and a further 13 were destroyed after returning with damage. LG 1 lost 119 crews and pilots killed, 102 missing and 36 captured. V. (Zerstörer)/LG 1 sustained particularly high losses, losing 25 Bf 110Cs between 4 July and 16 September. It was reduced to just 10 Bf 110s, but on 7 September 1940 it lost a further seven 110s, as a result the unit was withdrawn from operations. It was designated I.NJG 3 on 29 September.

=== Battles of Yugoslavia and Greece ===
I.(K)/LG 1 took part in the campaign. It sank the Allied transport vessels Ellenis on 20 April, in Piraeus harbour, and Pennland (16,000 grt) on 24 April. It continued anti-shipping missions throughout the remainder of the conflict. On 21 May 1941 the gruppe damaged the Royal Navy Leander-class cruiser HMS Ajax. During 22–27 May 1941, the battleships HMS Barham and HMS Warspite were damaged by LG 1s attacks.

=== North African and Mediterranean Theatres ===
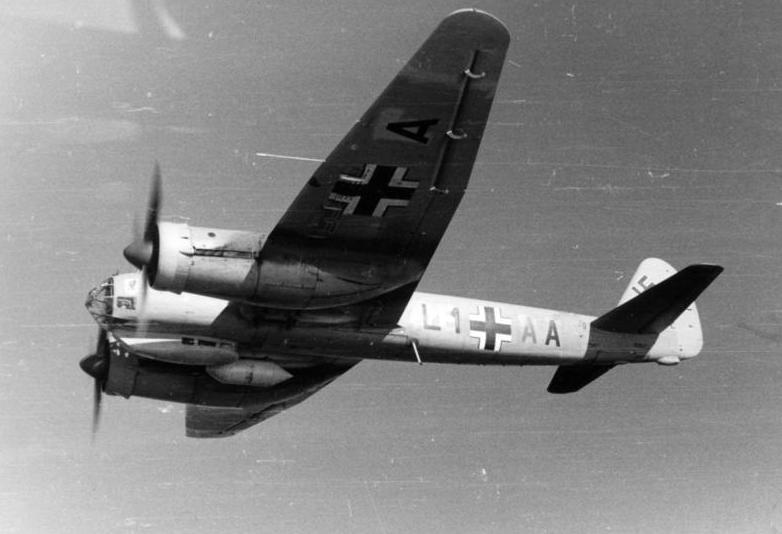
Ju 88A of Stab/LG 1 over North Africa, September 1941

Notable actions of the Geschwader during the two-year stint in North Africa included I.(K)/LG 1s sinking of three large transport vessels Clan Campbell, Clan Chattan and Rowallan Castle from the convoy MW 9, during attacks on 13–14 February 1941. On 1 June 1941 HMS Calcutta (D82) was sunk by Junkers Ju 88A bombers of Lehrgeschwader 1, approximately 100 nautical miles off Alexandria, Egypt. Calcutta was hit by two bombs and sank, with 255 men being rescued by Coventry and 107 men killed or missing. III./LG 1 also damaged the Australian destroyer HMAS Waterhen on 9 July 1941, and sank it on 11 July. The Geschwader supported the Afrikakorps until 1942. Bombing raids were made the Suez Canal, Cairo during this time. On 11/12 May I.(K)/LG 1 led by Hauptmann Joachim Helbig were responsible for sinking HMS Kipling, Jackal and Lively in the Gulf of Sollum. The Geschwader also took part in the Siege of Malta during October 1942. IV.(Erg)/LG 1 and III./LG 1 (disbanded and reformed in May 1943) were based in Greece and Italy for the remainder of the war, striking at Allied shipping. The units were bombed continually. Hangars and workshops that held vital spare parts were destroyed. The fuel crisis in July 1944 forced most of the two units to withdraw to Austria.

=== Soviet Union ===
III. Gruppe and IV.(Stuka)/LG 1 were the only Gruppen of the LG 1 to operate in the Soviet Union. III./LG 1 moved to Nikolayez in Ukraine from 23 to 24 March 1942. The units took part in the Battle of Sevastopol and the Battle of Stalingrad. It also conducted anti-shipping missions against the Soviet Navy and Black Sea Fleet in the Crimea. IV. Gruppe operated the Ju 87 from northern Norway and Finland at the start of Operation Barbarossa. It flew a variety of ground attack missions, and anti-shipping missions around Murmansk. According to its records, the Gruppe lost 26 Stukas, 21 crews killed, seven missing, 6 wounded and three captured between 3 September 1940 and 27 January 1942. Later, just prior to the Battle of Berlin, the Geschwader took part in Operation Eisenhammer, striking at the Oder bridges to prevent their use by the Red Army.

=== Western Front: 1944–1945 ===
The Geschwader attempted to support the German Army in France. Allied air superiority restricted it to flying at night. From 1 July 1944 to 31 August 1944 I.(K)/LG 1 lost 19 aircraft in the failed Operation Overlord (Normandy Campaign). The Gruppe also supported German forces during the Battle of the Bulge offensive. Operating at night to avoid Allied fighters, the unit attacked troop concentrations and marshalling yards in Belgium and France. On the night of 16/27 December 1944, the unit lost five Ju 88S-3s out of nine in a raid against Namur, Belgium. The Gruppe was ordered to disband on 22 April 1945 but was overrun by Canadian forces at Varel 26–28 April. II./LG 1 also lost 19 aircraft in these operations.

== Commanding officers ==
- Major Hans Jeschonnek, 1 October 1936 – November 1936
- Oberst Dr. Robert Knauss, 1 October 1937 – 17 November 1939
- Generalmajor Alfred Bülowius, 17 November 1939 – 21 October 1940
- Oberst Friedrich Karl Knust, 21 October 1940 – 18 February 1942
- Oberst Franz von Benda, June 1942 – 2 December 1942
- Oberstleutnant Hans-Werner Freiherr von Buchholtz, 24 March 1943 – 2 August 1943
- Oberst Joachim Helbig, 14 August 1943 – 2 March 1945
- Oberstleutnant Rudolf Hallensleben, September 1944 – January 1945 (acting)
- Oberst Joachim Helbig, January 1945 (acting)
- Major Richard Czekay, 2 March 1945 – 4 May 1945

== Bibliography ==
- Bergstrom, Christer (2007). Barbarossa - The Air Battle: July–December 1941. London: Chevron/Ian Allan. ISBN 978-1-85780-270-2.
- de Zeng, H.L; Stanket, D.G; Creek, E.J. Bomber Units of the Luftwaffe 1933-1945; A Reference Source, Volume 1. Ian Allan Publishing, 2007. ISBN 978-1-85780-279-5
- de Zeng, H.L; Stanket, D.G; Creek, E.J. Bomber Units of the Luftwaffe 1933-1945; A Reference Source, Volume 2. Ian Allan Publishing, 2007. ISBN 978-1-903223-87-1
- Taghon, Peter (2004). Die Geschichte des Lehrgeschwaders 1—Band 1—1936 – 1942 (in German). Zweibrücken, Germany: VDM Heinz Nickel. ISBN 3-925480-85-4.
- Taghon, Peter (2004). Die Geschichte des Lehrgeschwaders 1—Band 2—1942 – 1945 (in German). Zweibrücken, Germany: VDM Heinz Nickel. ISBN 3-925480-88-9.
