= 2nd Fighter Corps =

II. Jagdkorps German 2nd Fighter Corps
- Active: 15 September 1943 – 26 January 1945
- Country: Nazi Germany
- Branch: Luftwaffe

Commanders
- Notable commanders: Dietrich Peltz

2nd Fighter Corps (II. Jagdkorps) was formed 15 September 1943 in Chantilly from Höherer Jagdfliegerführer West. II. Jagdkorps was subordinated to Luftflotte 3, and from 26 September 1944 on to Luftwaffenkommando West. The headquarters was located at Chantilly and from August 1944 in Rochefort, from 10 September 1944 at Flammersfeld near Koblenz. On 26 January 1945 the Corps was disbanded. It was used to form the 14. Flieger-Divisionen and 15. Flieger-Divisionen.

== Commanding officers ==
- Generleutnant Werner Junck, 15 September 1943 – 30 June 1944
- General Alfred Bülowius, 1 July 1944 – 15 October 1944
- Generalmajor Dietrich Peltz, 15 October 1944 – 26 January 1945
- Generalmajor Karl-Eduard Wilke (acting), 12 January 1945 – 26 January 1945
