= Johann Condné =

German general

- Born: 9 January 1919
- Died: 26 October 2001 (aged 82)
- Military career
- Allegiance: Nazi Germany; West Germany
- Rank: Brigadegeneral
- Commands: deputy commander 10th Armoured Division
- Conflicts: World War II
- Awards: Knight's Cross of the Iron Cross

Johann Condné (9 January 1919 – 26 October 2001) was a German general in the Bundeswehr. During World War II, he served as an officer in the Wehrmacht and was a recipient of the Knight's Cross of the Iron Cross of Nazi Germany. Condné joined the Bundeswehr in 1955 and retired in 1979 as a Brigadegeneral.

== Awards and decorations ==
- Knight's Cross of the Iron Cross on 5 April 1945 as Hauptmann and commander of II./Panzergrenadier-Regiment 6
