= Johannes Fink =

Nazi general (1895–1981)

- Born: 28 March 1895; Pfullingen, Baden-Württemberg, German Empire
- Died: 1 June 1981 (aged 86); Pfullingen, Germany
- Military career
- Allegiance: German Empire; Weimar Republic; Nazi Germany
- Branch: Luftwaffe
- Rank: General der Flieger
- Commands: KG 2; 2. Flieger-Division; II. Fliegerkorps
- Conflicts: World War II
- Awards: Knight's Cross of the Iron Cross

Johannes Fink (28 March 1895 – 1 June 1981) was a German general during World War II. He became a recipient of the Knight's Cross of the Iron Cross of Nazi Germany.

== Awards and decorations ==
- Knight's Cross of the Iron Cross on 20 June 1940 as Oberst and Geschwaderkommodore of Kampfgeschwader 2
- German Cross in Gold on 1 October 1944 as Generalleutnant in the 2. Flieger-Division

Military offices
Preceded by None	Commander of Kampfgeschwader 2; 1 May 1939 – 20 October 1940	Succeeded by Oberst Herbert Rieckhoff
Preceded by General der Flieger Stefan Fröhlich	Commander of 2. Flieger-Division; 1 November 1942 – 10 February 1944	Succeeded by Generalmajor Hans Korte
Preceded by Generalleutant Kurt Kleinrath	Commander of II. Fliegerkorps; 1 December 1944 – January 1945	Succeeded by General der Flieger Stefan Fröhlich
