= 9th Air Division (Germany) =

9. Flieger-Division (9th Air Division) was one of the primary divisions of the German Luftwaffe in World War II. The division was founded on 1 February 1940 in Jever and initially subordinated to the Oberkommando der Luftwaffe (OBdL). On 23 May 1940 the division was subordinated to the Luftflotte 2 and transferred to Soesterberg in July 1940. The unit was redesignated IX. Fliegerkorps in November 1940.

The division was recreated as 9. Flieger-Division (J) on 26 January 1945 in Prague. The division led the various combat groups that had re-equipped with fighter aircraft and was subordinated to Luftflotte 10.

== Commanding officers ==
Flag of a commander of an Air Division

- General Joachim Coeler, 1 February 1940 – November 1940
- Oberst Hajo Herrmann, 26 January 1945 – May 1945
