= Operation Donnerkeil =

1942 German military operation

- Part of the Western Front of World War II
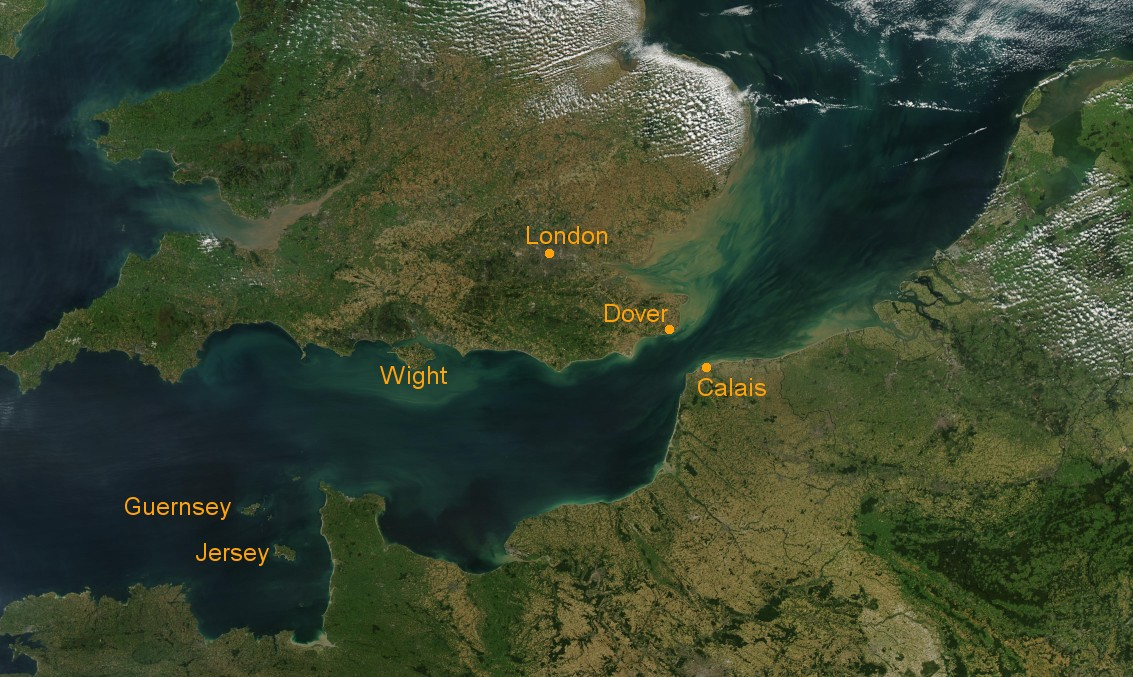
- Satellite view of the English Channel
Date	11–12 February 1942
Location	English Channel, North Sea and northern Germany 50°N 02°W
Result	German victory

Belligerents
United Kingdom; Canada	Germany

Commanders and leaders
(United Kingdom) Sholto Douglas (United Kingdom) Philip de la Ferté (United Kingdom) Trafford Leigh-Mallory	(Nazi Germany) Adolf Galland (Nazi Germany) Max Ibel

Strength
~450 aircraft	252 Bf 109 and Fw 190 fighters 30 Bf 110 Heavy fighters 32 Dornier Do 217s

Casualties and losses
41 aircraft	17 fighters 5 bombers 23 airmen killed, of that only 7 by enemy action (1 Bf 109F of 1./JG 26, 3 Fw 190 of 9./JG 26, 2 Do 217 (one of 4./KG 2 and one at 08:00 near Exeter of 7./KG 2), 1 Ju 88D-1 of 3.(F)/A.Gr. 122 by fighters

Unternehmen Donnerkeil (Operation Thunderbolt) was the codename for a German military operation during the Second World War. Donnerkeil was an air superiority operation designed to support Operation Cerberus, the Kriegsmarine (German Navy) plan to evacuate capital ships from France to Germany (an operation known to the British as the Channel Dash).

In 1941, Kriegsmarine surface vessels had conducted commerce raiding operations in support of German U-boats in the Battle of the Atlantic. Operation Berlin was launched in January 1941, followed by Operation Rheinübung in May. The Royal Navy's dominance prevented the German units from returning to ports in the Baltic Sea or Germany. The surviving ships, the battleships Scharnhorst and Gneisenau and the cruiser Prinz Eugen, docked at the port of Brest, France. Throughout 1941, RAF Bomber Command repeatedly attacked the ships. The proximity of the port to Royal Air Force (RAF) airfields allowed for frequent sorties against the vessels. The Oberkommando der Marine (Naval High Command) and Adolf Hitler desired to move the ships out of range of air raids.

In December 1941, the Oberkommando der Luftwaffe (High Command of the Air Force, OKL) was ordered to devise a plan to protect the three capital ships during their escape from Brest to Germany through the English Channel. General der Jagdflieger (General of the Fighter Force) Adolf Galland prepared the Luftwaffe's aircraft for the mission. Cerberus and its supporting air operation, Donnerkeil, began on 11 February 1942. The Germans achieved surprise during the initial phase of the operation; their ships reached Germany on 13 February 1942, two days after the operations began.

The Luftwaffe defeated British air attacks during the Channel Dash, enabling the naval contingent to reach German waters. In the air battles over the Channel, the British had significant losses. German losses were modest, and the operation achieved its objective.

== Background ==
The first German capital ships to dock at Brest were the Scharnhorst and the Gneisenau on 22 March 1941, following their eight-week participation in Operation Berlin against Allied shipping in the Atlantic. The heavy cruiser Prinz Eugen also sought refuge in the harbour on 1 June 1941, after the failed Operation Rheinübung. The ships were within easy range of British air power in port, and were subjected to frequent attacks and some damage. A ten-month offensive by the RAF beginning on 29 March 1941 consisted of 2,928 sorties, 171 of them in daylight. A raid on 24 July lost 12 per cent of its attacking force. Night bombing was safer for the British; the Germans lacked dedicated night-fighters, and the 18 losses to enemy action were attributed to anti-aircraft guns. During their campaign, the RAF employed more sophisticated navigation aids; on the night of 7/8 December 1941, the Oboe navigation system was used for the first time.

Concerned after the loss of the Bismarck, Hitler ordered the Kriegsmarine to move the ships to Germany for overhauling in preparation for their deployment to Norway; they would serve as a fleet in being and as the primary naval defence of German-occupied Norway. After lengthy discussions, the Oberkommando der Marine opted for the shorter (but, arguably, more dangerous) route through the English Channel.

On 12 January 1942, Hitler met the commanders of the operation at his headquarters in East Prussia (the Wolf's Lair). Present were Wilhelm Keitel (Commander-in-Chief of the Wehrmacht), Hans Jeschonnek (Chief of the Luftwaffe General Staff), Alfred Jodl (Chief of Staff for Military Operations), Adolf Galland (General der Jagdflieger), Erich Raeder (Commander-in-Chief of the Navy) and Vice-Admiral Otto Ciliax, who was to lead the battle group (Kampfgruppe). During the meeting, Hitler likened the German fleet to "a patient with cancer who is doomed unless they submit to an operation. An operation, on the other hand, even though it may have to be drastic, will at least offer some hope that the patient's life may yet be saved. The passage of our ships is such an operation. It must be attempted". Few operational details were discussed, but the Luftwaffe was ordered to provide air cover and diversionary raids against British targets. Jeschonnek promised about 250 aircraft.

== Preparations ==
=== Luftwaffe plan ===
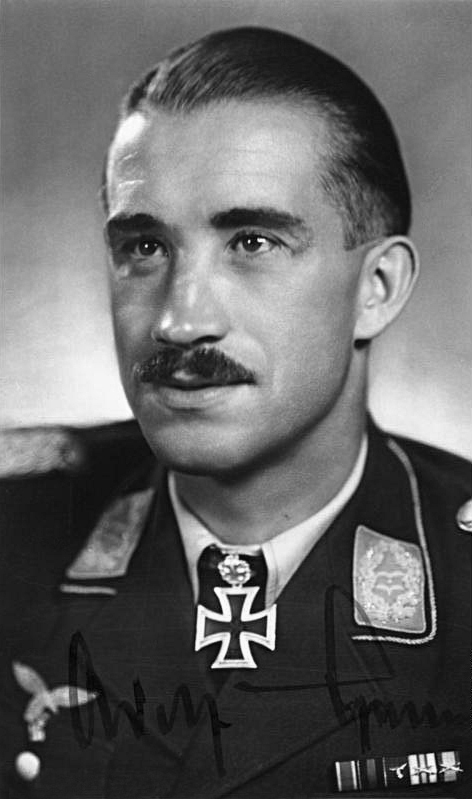
Adolf Galland, the planner of Donnerkeil

The OKL was apprehensive about Cerberus; Jeschonnek said to Galland that if the operation failed, the Luftwaffe would be made a scapegoat. During the 12 January meeting, the Navy demanded maximum fighter cover and won Hitler's support. Jeschonnek stood his ground against Galland, refusing to guarantee reinforcements to the Western fighter forces from other theatres. Galland was given executive authority for the air operation, which was codenamed Unternehmen Donnerkeil (Operation Thunderbolt). The operation was so secret that Jeschonnek and Galland had to sign secrecy pledges when they left Hitler's headquarters.

The plan's details were developed with Oberst (Colonel) Karl Koller, the Luftflotte 3 chief of staff (Air Fleet 3, under Generalfeldmarschall Hugo Sperrle). Some training units had to be mobilised to assemble sufficient strength, since most of the Jagdwaffe (fighter force) was deployed in the Soviet Union for Operation Barbarossa.

The route was divided into three sectors, based on Jafü (Fighter Sector) boundaries. To ensure local control, former Jagdgeschwader 27 Geschwaderkommodore (Wing Commander) Max Ibel was appointed Jagdfliegerführer Schiff (Fighter Controller Ship, abbreviated Jafü Schiff. He embarked on the Scharnhorst as a signals officer to communicate with Luftwaffe units. Eight dummy operations, involving about 450 sorties, were flown between 22 January and 10 February to train for the mission; it is unclear whether the British were aware of these exercises.

To disrupt British radio transmissions, the Funkhorchdienst (Radio Monitoring Service, a signals intelligence unit commanded by Wolfgang Martini) was tasked with jamming radio-telephone frequencies. They developed a subtle jamming technique that increased atmospheric interference, degrading the performance of British coastal radar. Dornier Do 217s from Kampfgeschwader 2 were ordered to fly electronic deception missions over the western channel to divert enemy aircraft. Fliegerkorps IX, commanded by Joachim Coeler, prepared to strike RAF bases in south-western England and to engage and slow any British naval forces that might attempt an interception. Fernaufklärungsgruppe 123 was responsible for maintaining reconnaissance at the east and west ends of the channel and was to support Fliegerkorps IX.

To ensure constant air support, Jagdgeschwader (Fighter Wings) and Nachtjagdgeschwader 1 (Night Fighter Wing 1) were ordered to achieve a frantic pace in servicing and preparing aircraft for their next missions. To maintain an aerial vigil over the task force, ground crews ("black men") had to rearm and refuel aircraft in 30 minutes or less. Galland insisted that the aircraft be split between high and low altitudes to provide robust cover; the low-altitude groups would be able to evade detection by British coastal radar. He demanded an umbrella of at least 16 fighters over the ships at all times along the length of the channel. The fighters were to be split into formations of eight aircraft for their respective patrol altitudes, with each formation further divided into two Schwärme of four aircraft. The Schwärme tactics involved one formation flying out to sea and another towards land in a zigzag pattern. All Schwärme were ordered to fly back and forth along the line of ships in wide figures-of-eight, maintaining radio silence. Each sortie was meticulously timed to allow fighters 30 minutes over the ships, enough time to maintain cover and allow the relieved units to refuel, rearm, and return. The relieving sorties arrived after only 20 minutes during Donnerkeil, however, increasing cover to 32 fighters for half of the operation.

Galland made it clear to the fighter pilots that the ships must be protected at all costs. They were expected to fly at least four sorties on the day of the operation, whose success would not be measured by the number of enemy aircraft shot down. RAF aircraft leaving the target area would be ignored, but attacking aircraft were to be engaged at all costs—with ramming, if necessary.

=== British preparations ===
Operation Fuller was the codename for the RAF plan to counter a German break-out. The RAF anticipated that the Germans might opt for the English Channel as their route. Captain Norman Denning, head of the Admiralty's Operational Intelligence Centre, was uncertain the Germans would attempt it but regarded it as a possibility. At the end of January, he warned that German warships were preparing to put to sea and a major operation should be expected. Denning sent a message to First Sea Lord Dudley Pound:

The short cut of the German ships is via the English Channel. It is 240 miles from Brest to Cherbourg and another 120 miles from Cherbourg to the Dover straits. While ships could make the passage from Brest to Cherbourg or from Cherbourg to the Dover straits in the same dark period, they could not make the complete passage from Brest to Dover in one dark period. At first sight this passage up the Channel seems hazardous for the Germans. It is probable, however, that as their heavy ships are not fully efficient, they would prefer such a passage, relying for their security on the destroyers and aircraft which are efficient, and knowing full well that we have no heavy ships to oppose them in the Channel ... Taking all factors into consideration, it appears that the Germans can pass east up the Channel with much less risk than they will incur if they attempt an ocean passage.

Air Marshal Philip Joubert de la Ferté, commander-in-chief of RAF Coastal Command, agreed that this was the probable route. He expected the Germans to make an attempt any time after 10 February. Unfortunately for the British, the Air Ministry and the three RAF commands—Coastal Command, RAF Bomber Command, and RAF Fighter Command—believed that the Germans would use darkness for the longest and most dangerous part of the journey through the straits and would have to leave in daylight. They believed that the inadequate forces at their disposal would be best used at night. Most of RAF Bomber Command was ordered to stand down, leaving it unprepared to operate in daylight on 12 February.

Coastal Command had agreed to provide three squadrons of Bristol Beaufort torpedo bombers. The Fleet Air Arm (FAA) contributed one squadron of Fairey Swordfish torpedo bombers. RAF Bomber Command had about 300 bombers on standby. The Swordfish were slow, making escorting them difficult. The Beaufort squadrons were dispersed, making it difficult to bring them together. One squadron was based at Leuchars, Scotland; one at Thorney Island in Portsmouth, and one near St Eval in Cornwall.

== Forces ==
=== Luftwaffe ===
The Luftwaffe contributed five wings to the operation. Jagdgeschwader 1 (JG 1), Jagdgeschwader 2 (JG 2), and Jagdgeschwader 26 (JG 26) were equipped with day fighters, primarily Messerschmitt Bf 109s and Focke-Wulf Fw 190s. JG 2 and JG 26 operated the Fw 190, and JG 1 operated the Bf 109. Nachtjagdgeschwader 1 was also pressed into service, its Messerschmitt Bf 110s operating in much smaller numbers. Kampfgeschwader 2 played a supporting role, mainly conducting maritime interdiction and air raids on enemy airfields in southern England to distract the RAF. In total, the Germans had 252 fighters, 30 heavy fighters, and 32 bombers. JG 26 maintained a "monopoly" on the Fw 190 at the time.

=== RAF and FAA ===
Confidence in the British bomber force was low; with no anti-shipping-attack training, their ability to inflict damage was poor. The main hope was in the torpedo bomber force, composed mainly of Beaufort and Swordfish aircraft from Coastal Command and the Fleet Air Arm. Beauforts from No. 42, No. 86, and No. 217 Squadron RAF were made available, but they were short of torpedoes. These three squadrons were the only ones available on 12 February 1942; about 57 Beauforts had been diverted to other theatres, leaving a chronic shortage of torpedo bombers in Britain. No. 415 and No. 489 Squadrons had been withdrawn to convert to Handley Page Hampdens, and No. 22 Squadron RAF was in the midst of transferring to the Middle East.

No. 825 Squadron FAA and their Fairey Swordfish were also made available. Lockheed Hudsons from No. 224 Squadron RAF and No. 233 Squadron RAF were committed to reconnaissance operations. No. 22 Squadron RAF was recalled from leave to take part. Hudsons from No. 407 Squadron RCAF were also available, placed on high alert, and took part in the fighting. RAF Bomber Command contributed No. 5 Group RAF, with 242 of its 300 aircraft available for service. Fighter Command committed No. 1, 19, 91, 41, 118, 129, 137, 234, 401, 403, 607, 316, 411, 452, 485, 128, 64, 65, 72, and 11 squadrons.

== Channel Dash ==
=== Contact ===
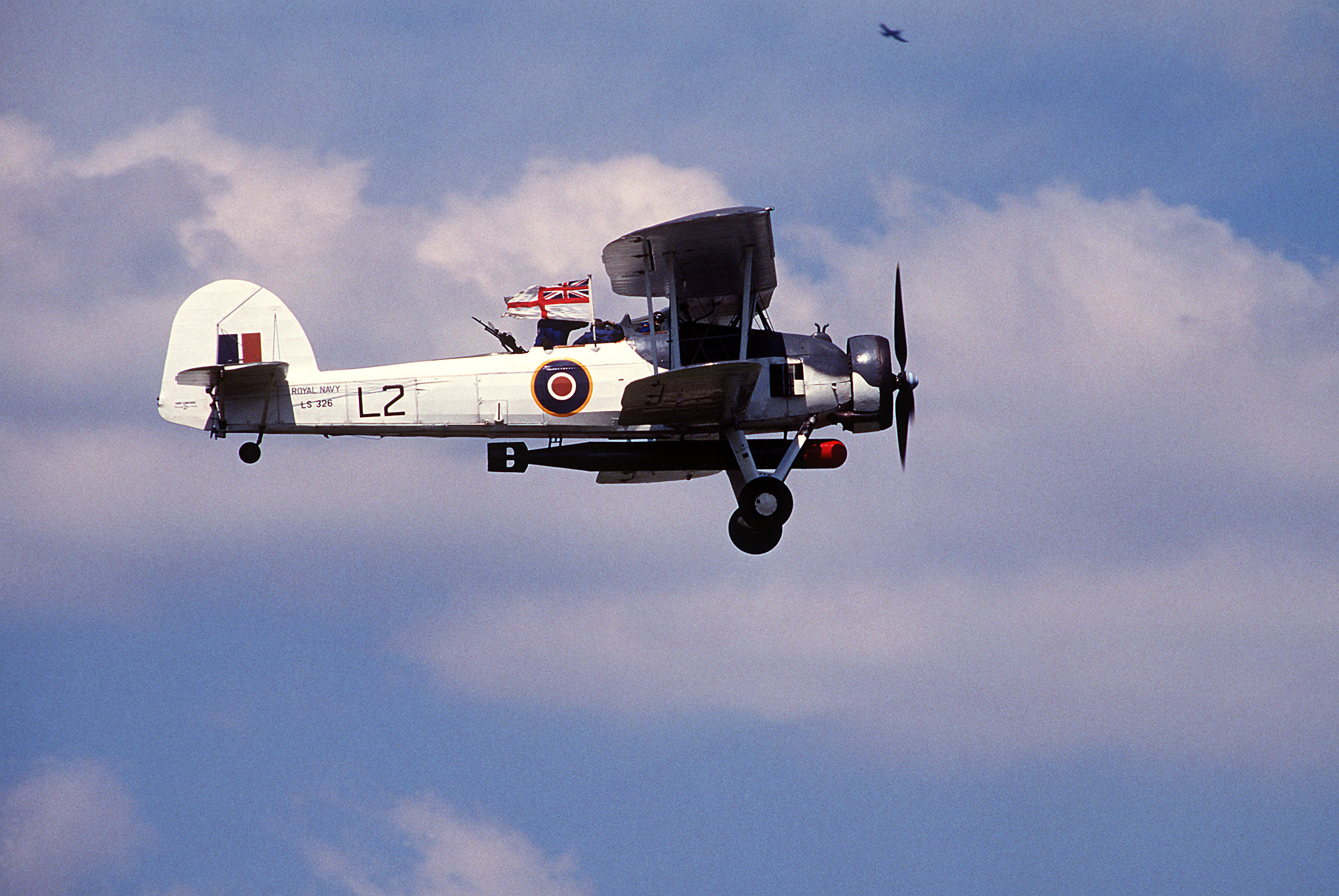
A Fairey Swordfish. All six sent on the mission were shot down.

On the evening of 10 February 1942, the German flotilla prepared to begin the operation. RAF bombers appeared overhead as the ships slipped anchor, forcing them to return to the dock. The bombers released their payloads but did little damage. Fortunately for the Germans, the British did not notice anything unusual.

Ultra intercepts had put the British on alert, but mistakes and bad luck allowed the Germans to evade detection. Three Hudsons from Coastal Command patrolled at three positions. The first, codenamed "Stopper," maintained surveillance off Brest between sunset and first light. The second, "Line SE," watched north of the port, and the third, "Habo," covered the area between Le Havre and Boulogne. On 11 February, the "Stopper" patrol aircraft took off at 19:25 but was intercepted by a Bf 110 night-fighter of NJG 1. The Hudson evaded the attacker, but its ASV radar became unusable, forcing it to return to St. Eval and land at 20:40. Its replacement reached the area at 22:38; in the meantime, Ciliax and his ships had slipped their moorings. The "Line SE" Hudson should have detected the German fleet, but its ASV failed at 20:55. After attempts to repair it failed, the Hudson returned to base at 21:50 and no replacement was sent. Everything now depended on "Habo." Mist began to form over the airfield at Thorney Island at dawn, however, threatening to prevent a safe landing for the Hudson. It was recalled an hour early, just as the German ships were approaching the "Habo" patrol line. II./NJG 1 flew 19 sorties to protect the ships during the night, replaced by JG 2 at 08:00.

For eleven hours, the German fleet sailed from Brest towards the Dover Strait. By chance, a radar technician at the Fairlight, East Sussex station had just finished repairs when he detected 27 echoes south of Cap Gris Nez at 10:15 on 12 February. The information was relayed to Vice-Admiral Ramsay, who ordered his Air Officer liaison to contact No. 11 Group RAF and request armed reconnaissance. Ramsay also warned No. 16 Group RAF and the FAA squadron at RAF Manston that possible targets were in the channel, although he did not know the exact number or size of the vessels. Radar performance had been suppressed by jamming (Ballstöranlage) from two Heinkel He 111s flying off the south coast. The Fairlight detection was fortunate for the British, since the Germans thought that station was out of action. Ten Do 217s from III./KG 2 flew missions against Plymouth harbour and airfield, and another 15 flew diversionary flights to keep RAF fighters clear of the He 111s.

Ramsay's request arrived at RAF Kenley. Two experienced pilots, Group Captain Victor Beamish (10 victories) and Wing Commander Finlay Boyd (14 victories), were dispatched in Spitfires. Flying over the Channel, they encountered large numbers of Bf 109s protecting a fleet of warships and dived away. Maintaining radio silence, they kept their discovery until they landed. They sighted the ships at 10:42, and landed at 11:09. It was another 16 minutes before Bomber Command was alerted, and Ramsay did not know of the situation until 11:30. The first naval actions began between escorting Schnellboots and British Motor Torpedo Boats (MTBs) at about 12:16 GMT, and the British commands were finally alerted. Galland ordered all low-flying aircraft to cease, and allowed Max Ibel and his team aboard Scharnhorst to break radio silence. Ibel then began directing Fw 190s and Bf 109s towards approaching RAF units. As the first outnumbered British units arrived over the ships, the German vessels were at their closest point to German airfields; this allowed the Luftwaffe to provide maximum protection.

=== Main assaults ===
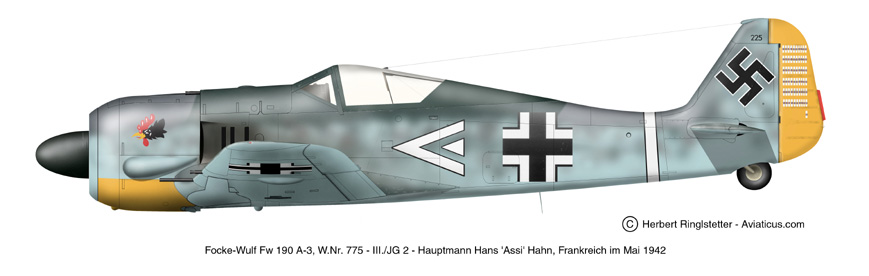
Fw 190 of JG 26, 1942

Lieutenant Commander Eugene Esmonde, acting commander of No. 825 Squadron FAA, took off with his Swordfish formation at 12:25 to attack the ships. No. 411 and No. 64 Squadrons were to provide escort, but arrived over Manston 15 minutes late and missed the rendezvous. The only unit to keep to its mission orders was No. 72 Squadron under Squadron Leader Brian Kingcome. Unaware of the Swordfish squadron's location, they ran into each other; because of low clouds, they dropped to between 50 and 100 feet. The German fighter cover overwhelmed the Spitfire protection, and the RAF fighters had to defend themselves. The Spitfires and Swordfish were engaged by Fw 190s of 8. and 9. Staffel of JG 26, led by Gruppenkommandeur Gerhard Schöpfel of III./JG 26. The Fw 190s were relieving JG 2 fighters. Frail and slow, the Swordfish forced the German pilots to lower their undercarriages to avoid overshooting the biplanes. All six Swordfish were shot down, and the Spitfires destroyed three Fw 190s in return. Several Swordfish released their torpedoes, but none found their mark. Esmonde was shot down and killed; he was posthumously awarded the Victoria Cross. Only five of the original eighteen Swordfish crewmen survived. No. 41 Squadron RAF claimed three Bf 109s (most likely from JG 1) destroyed and one damaged off the Belgian coast. No. 72 Squadron claimed three Fw 190s destroyed and four damaged around 13:00. No. 410 Squadron claimed two Bf 109s destroyed and two damaged in the dogfights. The German ships used very little ammunition, since the action was largely handled by the Luftwaffe.

The stand-down order meant that RAF Bomber Command's contribution came relatively late in the day, with 73 bombers dispatched between 13:55 and 14:50 GMT. None of the attackers scored a hit. t Nine Beauforts from No. 42 Squadron, led by W. H. Cliff, took off at 14:35. Arriving over Manston at 14:50, they found aircraft from No. 407 Squadron RCAF orbiting. It took nearly 30 minutes to make a formation. They attacked the Gneisenau and Prinz Eugen with several other squadrons from heights of 60 to 100 feet, but their torpedoes missed. No. 42 Squadron had no losses. The Hudsons struck from 400 to 900 feet, and two RCAF bombers were lost without success. No. 217 Squadron nearly achieved a hit on the Gneisenau but the ship turned away, just avoiding the torpedoes. Later, a wave of 134 to 137 bombers intercepted the ships between 16:00 and 17:05. Only 20 crews attacked because of poor training, a cloud base of 700 m (2,300 ft), and visibility at sea level of 1,000–2,000 yd (910–1,830 m). Nine bombers were lost. Another formation of 35 Vickers Wellingtons attempted a strike between 17:50 and 18:15, losing two planes. Of the 242 bombers that took part, only 39 are confirmed to have conducted attacks. Another 16 may have done so, suggesting that a maximum of 55 aircraft bombed the ships. Fifteen of them were shot down. RAF Fighter Command also committed Hawker Hurricane fighter-bombers over the Dover area.

The British damaged the Gneisenau and Scharnhorst, the latter seriously. The Scharnhorst struck two mines, one at 14:31 and a second at 21:34 GMT. The Gneisenau also struck a mine at 18:55 GMT. The Scharnhorst was stopped dead in the water with engine damage after the first mine hit. The failure to alert Bomber Command earlier missed a crucial opportunity to attack the Scharnhorst when it was most vulnerable. The second and third mine hits occurred after nightfall, which enabled both vessels to avoid further attacks; the last RAF sighting of the ships was at 18:00 GMT. It is unclear who was responsible for the mine damage. The mines may have been laid by Hampden bombers; if so, they inflected far more damage than the Royal Navy and the rest of the RAF combined.

=== Losses and overclaiming ===
In protecting the bombers, Fighter Command lost 20 fighters; fourteen pilots were killed, and three captured. Only eight of the fighters were shot down by the Luftwaffe; eight more were lost to anti-aircraft fire, two collided, and two were lost for unknown reasons. The losses consisted of ten Spitfires, six Hawker Hurricanes, and four Westland Whirlwinds. Overclaiming was significant on both sides during the air battles, although the Luftwaffe's claims were more exaggerated. RAF fighters claimed 16 Bf 109s destroyed and 13 damaged, along with four Fw 190s destroyed and six damaged. Actual German losses were 17 fighters and five Do 217s from III./KG 2, which had participated in raids against RAF airfields. Twenty-three people were killed. German fighter units claimed 60 RAF aircraft shot down. British aircraft losses totalled 41, a number of which were due to anti-aircraft fire. The Luftwaffe flew 300 fighter and 40 bomber sorties on 11–12 February.

== Attacks in port ==
The German flotilla reached home ports on the evening of 12 February. The threat from RAF bombers in daylight was gone, but Bomber Command soon began night attacks on Kiel harbour. The Gneisenau was moved into an inner basin alongside her depot ship, the Monte Olivia. Her hatches were left open, and her fuel tanks (still containing a large amount of fuel) were left unattended. On the night of 25/26 February, Bomber Command made its first attack when 61 bombers flew over Kiel. The Monte Olivia was destroyed, but the Gneisenau escaped. On 26/27 February, another 61 RAF bombers returned. A bomb penetrated the Gneisenau's foredeck and exploded. Fumes from the oil tanks ignited, and the ship was engulfed in flames from bow to A turret. She steamed to Gdynia, Poland, on 4 April, where she was decommissioned out of range of RAF bombers. The damage was so severe that the Gneisenau did not put to sea again. The raid cost the RAF three aircraft. German deaths were 16 civilians and 116 sailors.

On 27/28 February 1942, 33 bombers flew over Wilhelmshaven searching for the Scharnhorst. Clouds obscured the area, and German reports noted only three explosions. Three Armstrong Whitworth Whitley bombers were lost to undisclosed causes. The Scharnhorst was ready for redeployment by the summer of 1942, but accidents (which included striking a mine and running aground) delayed this until the end of the year. It took three attempts to sail to Norway. On 10 January 1943, she was spotted by RAF aircraft and turned back after reaching the Skagerrak. Another attempt in January failed. On 3 March 1943, the Scharnhorst finally reached Norway. She survived another eight months before being sent on her last wartime mission, Operation Ostfront, when she was sunk during the Battle of the North Cape.

== Aftermath ==
=== British failures ===
The failure to coordinate the FAA, RAF, and Royal Navy dispersed their efforts. Confusion stemming from the weather and the lack of central control of British sea and air forces made each element work independently. Several friendly fire incidents occurred, such as an attack by No. 217 Squadron on HMS Mackay. The most serious failure was the inability of Fighter Command to protect bomber and naval forces. Although weather also hampered German fighter activity, by the time a target area was reached time had been wasted by bomber formations searching for their fighter escorts (which never arrived, or received orders too late). Little communication existed between, or among, fighter and bomber units. Bomber Command crews, who were most of the attacking force, were not trained for attacks on naval targets. The only dedicated anti-shipping torpedo-bomber squadrons from Coastal Command, Nos. 42 and 217, were five torpedoes short because of supply problems.

Joubert de la Ferté blamed the failure of Operation Fuller on the long-term neglect of anti-shipping aviation, not on those directing the forces during the operation or on the intelligence services. Joubert called for all anti-shipping units to be consolidated under one command. Better training, more aircraft, and higher-quality equipment would allow the RAF to avoid a repeat of the Channel Dash. The Air Ministry refused his request and put No. 2 Group of Bomber Command in support of coastal units against enemy shipping between Cherbourg and Wilhelmshaven. Production and procurement remained in favour of Bomber Command for the strategic bombing campaign over Germany, even after the failure of Fuller. Adding to the RAF's difficulties, most of Coastal Command's anti-shipping units were transferred to the Mediterranean Theatre of Operations and left it short of naval-strike aircraft in 1942. Air Marshal Charles Portal said that this needed to change: "We agree on the importance of torpedo bomber aircraft, and this was proved completely during the passage of the Scharnhorst and Gneisenau [and Prinz Eugen] up the channel". Joubert obtained the new Bristol Beaufighter in May 1942, which entered service in November of that year; however, only one squadron was made operational. Despite the clear need for anti-shipping strike aircraft, the service continued to struggle until 1943, when Portal fulfilled his promise and more of these aircraft (including the de Havilland Mosquito) became available.

Donnerkeil was a watershed moment in electronic warfare. By jamming the British radar, Wolfgang Martini's unit removed British inhibitions about using electronic countermeasures (ECM) against the Kammhuber Line on the continent. This paved the way for the debut of Window (Chaff) in June 1943, which had a devastating effect on the ability of German night-fighter radar to locate and intercept RAF bombers during the defence of the Reich. The first step in this electronic campaign was a British Army raid, Operation Biting, to steal a Würzburg radar set on 27/28 February 1942. The British analysed its components and developed countermeasures. The Germans responded by fortifying all radar installations, which made them more visible to RAF reconnaissance. The British also began occasionally jamming Freya radar sets, which the Germans did not detect until September 1942. German forces also jammed British radar to enable their fighter-bomber operations over England, which the British described as a "real menace". From then on, radar-jamming and countermeasures escalated.

=== German perspective ===
Donnerkeil was an outstanding success for the Luftwaffe. Its success lay not in its loss ratio (2:1 in favour of Germany), but in the failure of the RAF, FAA, and Royal Navy to intercept or severely damage the German warships. The meagre forces committed by the Royal Navy had been easily repulsed by the German warships and their escorts. Although anti-aircraft fire was helpful against air attack, German aircraft and poor weather broke up RAF attacks on the ships. Galland, who was responsible for the air plan, called it the high point of his career.

For the Kriegsmarine, Operation Cerberus was an operational success but a strategic reversal; the situation in the Atlantic had forced them into a strategic withdrawal. The German campaign in the Atlantic would be conducted primarily by U-boats, unsupported by a surface fleet. With German capital ships removed from French Atlantic ports, the British could contain them much more effectively in Norway and the North Sea. None of the ships sailed in the Atlantic again. The Scharnhorst and Gneisenau had been damaged by mines and required extensive repairs. Weeks after Cerberus, the Prinz Eugen was torpedoed and her stern collapsed. All three ships were out of action for extended periods. More bad luck followed; the Gneisenau was knocked out for good in February 1942, and the Scharnhorst was sunk in December 1943.
