= Channel Dash =

German naval operation during the Second World War

Channel Dash; (Unternehmen Zerberus/Operation Cerberus)
- Part of the Atlantic Campaign of the Second World War
- Diagram of the course taken by Operation Cerberus (in French)
Date	11–13 February 1942
Location	English Channel
Result	German victory

Belligerents
Germany	United Kingdom

Commanders and leaders
Otto Ciliax	Bertram Ramsay

Strength
2 battleships; 1 heavy cruiser; 6 destroyers; 14 torpedo boats; 26 E-boats; 32 bombers; 252 fighters	6 destroyers; 3 destroyer escorts; 32 motor torpedo boats; c. 450 aircraft

Casualties and losses
2 battleships damaged; 1 destroyer damaged; 1 destroyer slight damage; 2 torpedo boats slight damage; Patrol boat V1302 sunk; 22 aircraft destroyed (7 fighters); 13 sailors killed; 2 wounded; 23 aircrew killed (4 from JG 26)	230–250 killed and wounded; 1 destroyer severe damage; MTBs damaged; 42 aircraft destroyed

The Channel Dash (German: Unternehmen Zerberus, Operation Cerberus) was a German naval operation during the Second World War. (Note: German: Zerberus (Cerberus), a three-headed dog of Greek mythology who guards the gate to Hades.) A Kriegsmarine (German Navy) squadron, comprising the two Scharnhorst-class battleships, Scharnhorst and Gneisenau, the heavy cruiser Prinz Eugen and their escorts was evacuated from Brest in Brittany to German ports. Scharnhorst and Gneisenau had arrived in Brest on 22 March 1941 after the success of Operation Berlin in the Atlantic. More raids were planned and the ships were refitted at Brest. The ships were a threat to Allied trans-Atlantic convoys and RAF Bomber Command attacked them from 30 March 1941. Gneisenau was hit on 6 April 1941 and Scharnhorst on 24 July, after dispersal to La Pallice. In late 1941, Adolf Hitler ordered the Oberkommando der Marine (OKM; German Navy High Command) to plan an operation to return the ships to German bases, in case of a British invasion of Norway. The short route up the English Channel was preferred to a detour around the British Isles for surprise and air cover by the Luftwaffe and on 12 January 1942, Hitler gave orders for the operation.

The British exploited decrypts of German radio messages coded with the Enigma machine, air reconnaissance by the RAF Photographic Reconnaissance Unit (PRU) and agents in France, to watch the ships and report the damage caused by the bombing. Operation Fuller, a joint Royal Navy–RAF contingency plan, was devised to counter a sortie by the German ships against Atlantic convoys, a return to German ports by circumnavigating the British Isles, or a dash up the English Channel. The Royal Navy had to keep ships at Scapa Flow in Scotland in case of a sortie by the German battleship Tirpitz from Norway. The RAF had sent squadrons from Bomber and Coastal commands overseas and kept torpedo bombers in Scotland ready for Tirpitz, that limited the number of aircraft available against a dash up the Channel, as did the winter weather which reduced visibility and blocked airfields with snow.

On 11 February 1942, the ships left Brest at 10:45 p.m. (German time) and escaped detection for more than twelve hours, approaching the Strait of Dover without discovery. The Luftwaffe provided air cover in Unternehmen Donnerkeil (Operation Thunderbolt) and as the ships neared Dover, the British belatedly responded. Attacks by the RAF, Fleet Air Arm, Navy and bombardments by coastal artillery were costly failures but Scharnhorst and Gneisenau were damaged by mines in the North Sea (Scharnhorst was out of action for a year). By 13 February, the ships had reached German ports; Winston Churchill ordered an inquiry into the débâcle and The Times denounced the British fiasco. The Kriegsmarine judged the operation a tactical success and a strategic failure, because the threat to Atlantic convoys had been sacrificed for a hypothetical threat to Norway. On 23 February, Prinz Eugen was torpedoed off Norway and after being repaired, spent the rest of the war in the Baltic. Gneisenau went into dry dock and was bombed on the night of 26/27 February, never to sail again; Scharnhorst was sunk at the Battle of the North Cape on 26 December 1943.

== Background ==
=== Port of Brest, 1940–1941 ===
La Pallice and the French Channel ports

German commerce raiding against British north Atlantic convoys was made easier by the capture of Norway and France in 1940. An abortive sortie by the cruiser Admiral Hipper ended at Brest, at the west end of the Brittany peninsula, on 27 December 1940. After five weeks of attacks by Bomber Command to no effect, the ship put to sea on 1 February 1941, sank numerous ships and returned on 14 February, before sailing to Germany using the roundabout route via the Denmark Strait the next day, reaching Kiel on 28 March. The commerce raids in the north Atlantic during the winter of 1940–1941 by Scharnhorst-class battleships Scharnhorst and Gneisenau, the heavy cruisers Admiral Scheer and Admiral Hipper sank British shipping at a higher rate than German surface ships achieved for the rest of the war. The British reformed 19 Group for Coastal Command in January 1941, which kept watch on the German ships at Brest; Scharnhorst and Gneisenau arrived at the port on 22 March 1941.

=== British air offensive, 1941 ===
From 10 January to mid-April 1941, Bomber Command aimed 829 long tons (842 t) of bombs at the ships in Brest harbour. Winston Churchill issued the Battle of the Atlantic directive on 9 March, directing the priority of the British war effort temporarily to counter the German campaign against Atlantic convoys. The RAF photographic reconnaissance unit (1 PRU) discovered Scharnhorst and Gneisenau in port on 28 March. Bomber Command flew about 1,161 sorties against the ships in Brest, through poor weather over the next two months. Gneisenau needed an engine room overhaul and entered dry dock on 4 April and an unexploded bomb was found between the stocks under the ship. Gneisenau had to be refloated and removed to defuse the bomb. Gneisenau was moored in an exposed position in the roadstead, where it was photographed by a 1 PRU Spitfire on 5 April. A raid was quickly planned with the six Beaufort torpedo bombers at RAF St Eval for an attack at dawn the next day. (Note: These Beauforts were part of a group of nine aircraft on detachment to St Eval from 22 squadron. Three aircraft were already on other operations, leaving six available. An attack by torpedo bombers against an elaborately defended harbour was judged to be a particularly hazardous operation. This was balanced against the instructions from Churchill that risks must be taken against such an important target. All the planners could do was ensure the best chance of hitting their target to balance against the high chance of losses. Accurate flying was needed to drop a torpedo in the confines of the harbour and high ground on the landward side made escaping the anti-aircraft fire unlikely.)

Three Beauforts carried bombs to damage the torpedo nets that were presumed to protect the ship and three carried torpedoes. Two of the bombers bogged when taxiing for take-off and the third never found Brest in the thick weather. Two of the torpedo-bombers arrived off Brest, where they were to wait until the nets had been bombed. As dawn arrived the Beaufort flown by Kenneth Campbell attacked and dropped the torpedo as they passed over the mole giving it the maximum distance to arm on its run to its target. There were no torpedo nets and Gneisenau was hit on the starboard side near the after turret; the Beaufort was shot down, killing all on board. The damage to Gneisenau was severe, affecting the starboard propeller shaft bearings and shaft tunnel, causing flooding where the explosion destroyed the watertight integrity of stuffing boxes. Fuel and seawater got into some important compartments and some equipment suffered shock damage. A salvage tug was needed to assist in getting the flooding under control.

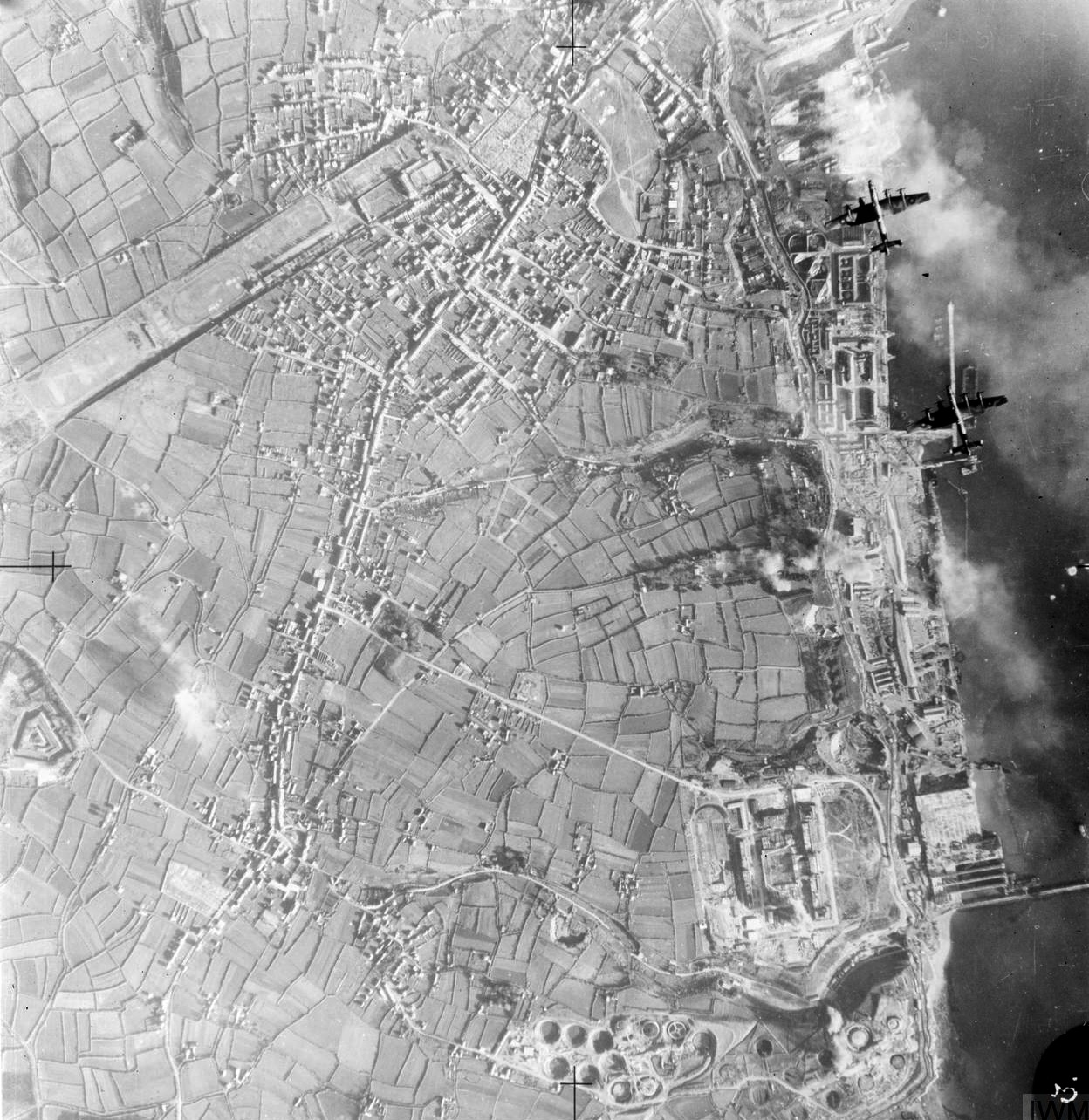
35 Squadron Halifax bombers over Brest, 1941

Gneisenau went back into dry dock; on the night of 10/11 April it was hit by four bombs and had two near misses. One of the hits did not explode but the others killed 75 crewmen, jammed 'B' turret and distorted the armoured deck near it, made about a third of the crew quarters uninhabitable by fire and blast damage, destroyed the kitchens and bakery and affected some gunnery control systems. The damage to Gneisenau led the Seekriegsleitung (SKL) to raise the question of the suitability of Brest for heavy surface units; Raeder disagreed and wanted more air defences instead. Scharnhorst was not damaged but the bomb hits on the docks delayed its refit, which included a substantial overhaul of its machinery; the boiler superheater tubes had a manufacturing defect that had plagued the ship throughout Operation Berlin. Repairs had been expected to take ten weeks but delays, exacerbated by British mine laying in the vicinity, caused them to miss Unternehmen Rheinübung (Operation Rhine Exercise). The sortie by Bismarck and Prinz Eugen into the North Atlantic went ahead and Bismarck was sunk; Prinz Eugen returned to Brest on 1 June. Hitler ordered that capital ships must operate with much greater caution, that severely limited the freedom of action of the German surface fleet.

During the summer the new RAF heavy bombers attacked Gneisenau, Prinz Eugen and Scharnhorst. Prinz Eugen was hit on the night of 1/2 July and put out of action. The sailing on 21 July of Scharnhorst to La Pallice forestalled a surprise attack by Bomber Command. Scharnhorst was attacked by six Stirling bombers on the evening of 23 July and German fighters shot down one bomber. The attack on Brest took place in daylight on 24 July, with a loss of 13 bombers; La Pallice was bombed again by fifteen Halifaxes. The formation was met by 12 to 18 Bf 109s and anti-aircraft fire (FlaK); five bombers were shot down and five seriously damaged; Scharnhorst was hit five times. (Note: The plan had been to make a surprise attack on the ships at Brest in daylight, escorted by five long-range Spitfire squadrons, which by then had been fitted with external fuel tanks. Only 30 single-engined and nine twin-engined German day fighters were thought to be based near Brest, with another 60 at Cherbourg and the Channel Islands. Bomber Command planners thought that 140–150 bombers would be needed. The bomber pilots were inexperienced in formation flying and the number of long-range Spitfires was insufficient to escort a loose formation. Fortress Is were to attack first at height, followed by 18 Hampdens, with Spitfire escorts, to attract German fighters and leave them short of fuel and ammunition. The main force of 120 Wellington bombers and heavy bombers were to attack for 45 minutes, with the last two Spitfire squadrons in the vicinity for any German fighters that managed to make second sorties. The fighters near Cherbourg were to be diverted by Blenheim bombers covered by Spitfires. The Hampden crews trained for a month but the plan was upset when Scharnhorst was found to have sailed to La Pallice, beyond the reach of the long-range Spitfires. The heavy bombers were taken out of the Brest attack and Manchester bombers were withdrawn due to mechanical defects, reducing the main force to 78 bombers. The rest of the bombers attacked Brest on 24 July; the Fortress crews saw a few German fighters and the Hampdens reported about 24 more but the main force was too small to swamp the German ground defences. Eleven bombers were shot down and two more bombers crashed on their return flights.) While returning to Brest containing 3,000 long tons (3,000 t) of seawater, Scharnhorst was attacked by a Beaufort but shot it down before it could drop its torpedo. By late July 1941, the bombing left the three large ships in Brest undergoing extensive repairs. Lützow had been seriously damaged by a torpedo on 13 June; Admiral Scheer and Admiral Hipper were undergoing maintenance in German shipyards, Tirpitz was still working up and Bismarck had been sunk. British code breakers had contributed to the destruction of the German supply-ship network in the Atlantic that supported surface ship actions against Allied convoys.

From 28 March to the end of July, 1,962 long tons (1,993 t) of bombs were dropped in 1,875 sorties, 1,723 by Bomber Command, which also sent 205 mine laying sorties, with another 159 from Coastal Command, laying 275 mines off Brest; the British lost 34 aircraft, three being mine layers. For the next two months, Bomber Command made frequent small attacks, then 56 bombers attacked on the night of 3/4 September, followed by 120 bombers on the night of 13/14 September. Frequent small attacks were resumed and about 1,000 sorties were flown from July to December. At the start of the month, the Brest Group was made the Bomber Command priority again and from 11 December, bombing and mine laying took place nightly. When Prinz Eugen was found out of dry dock on 16 December, a 101-bomber attack was made on the night of 17/18 December followed by a day operation by 41 heavy bombers on the afternoon of 18 December, escorted by ten fighter squadrons. Gneisenau was slightly damaged and dock gates were smashed, stranding Scharnhorst for a month, for the loss of six bombers. Attacks continued all month and another day raid by Halifaxes was made on 30 December. From 1 August to 31 December, 1,175 long tons (1,194 t) of high explosive and 10 long tons (10 t) of incendiaries were dropped, eleven heavy bombers were shot down and considerable damage was inflicted on the docks and the town but none of the ships were hit again. Gneisenau was damaged on the evening of 6 January; 37 per cent of Bomber Command sorties between 10 December and 20 January 1942 were flown against the ships at Brest. (Note: A Directorate of Bomber Operations paper of 5 April 1941 concluded that achieving one hit on each ship took 2,200 to 5,000 bombs.)

=== Ultra ===
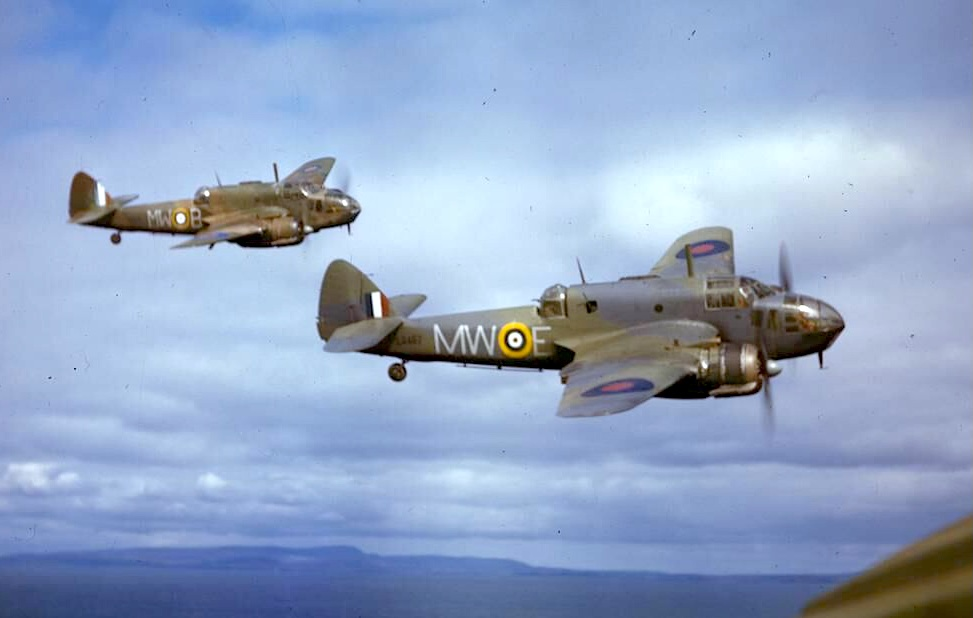
Bristol Beaufort torpedo-bombers of 217 Squadron, RAF Coastal Command

Ultra was the code name used by British military intelligence for signals intelligence obtained by breaking German radio and teleprinter communications, including signals encrypted by Enigma, a German electro-mechanical rotor cipher machine. The decryption was carried out at the Government Code and Cypher School at Bletchley Park and the information was passed on to operational commands. From May 1941, Bletchley could read the Enigma Home Waters setting used by surface ships with few failures or interruptions, which combined with the PRU and reports from agents kept watch on the ships at Brest. By April 1941, the British knew that the three ships had been hit but not the extent of the damage.

From 16 to 23 December, Enigma decrypts showed that the gunners of the ships were on the Baltic, conducting gunnery training. Next day, the Admiralty warned that an attempt to break out was likely. On 25 January 1942, the ships were photographed in the harbour and two short periods in dry dock by two ships were seen. From the end of January to early February, torpedo boats, minesweepers and destroyers joined the big ships; together with news that the battleship Tirpitz in Norway had moved to the south, this led the Admiralty to issue an appreciation on 2 February that the three ships were going to attempt to sail up the channel and sent the signal Executive Fuller, the order to begin the operation to prevent the German Fleet from breaking into the North Atlantic. Next day Enigma and RAF photographic reconnaissance (PR) found that the number of German ship reinforcements from Brest to the Hook of Holland had risen to seven destroyers, ten torpedo-boats, more than 30 minesweepers, 25 E-boats and many smaller craft.

=== Norway Hypothesis ===
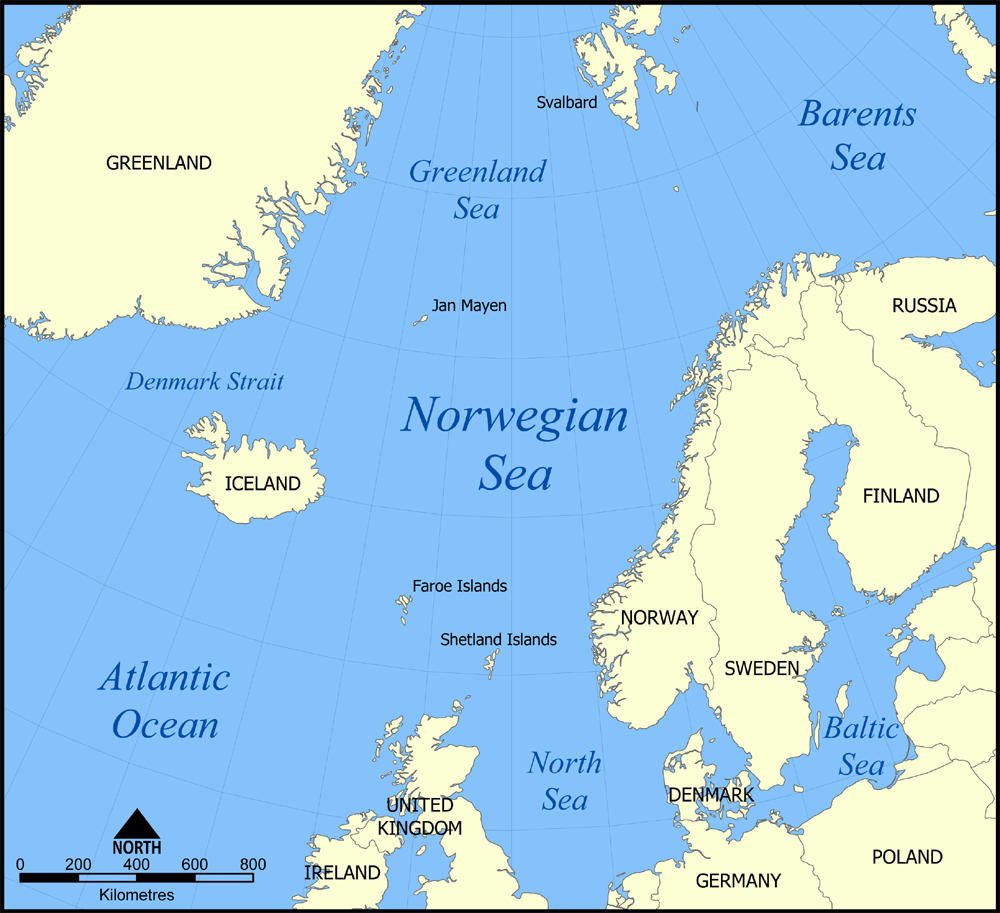
Map showing the Denmark Strait between Greenland and Iceland

During 1941, Hitler decided that the Brest Group should return to home waters in a "surprise break through the Channel", as part of a plan to thwart a British invasion of Norway. OKM preferred the Denmark Strait passage to Germany and Großadmiral (Grand Admiral) Erich Raeder called a journey along the English Channel impossible. Hitler said that the break-out should be planned with no training period, since British intelligence was bound to find out and have the ships bombed. Hitler ordered that a period of bad weather should be chosen, when the bulk of the RAF would be grounded. Vizeadmiral (Vice-Admiral) Kurt Fricke, Chief of Staff of the SKL, opposed Hitler but was allowed only a short time to review the policy. On 12 January 1942, Raeder again opposed the channel route but planned for it, provided that Hitler took the final decision.

Hitler noted that the ships at Brest had diverted British bombing from Germany but that the advantage would end as soon as the ships were sufficiently damaged. Vice Admiral Otto Ciliax outlined a plan for a standing start at night to gain surprise and to pass the Strait of Dover, 21 mi (34 km) wide and the narrowest part of the Channel, during the day, to benefit from fighter cover at the danger point. The Luftwaffe refused to guarantee that the 250 fighters available could protect the ships but Hitler accepted the plan. Hitler ordered that the battleship Tirpitz, already in Norway, was to be moved south to Trondheim. At a conference on 22 January, Hitler announced that all ships and U-boats should assemble for the defence of Norway and on 25 January, Vizeadmiral Karl Dönitz (Befehlshaber der U-Boote BdU, Commander of Submarines) was ordered to withdraw eight submarines to patrol off Iceland, the Faroe Islands and Scotland. Despite protests from Dönitz, another twelve U-boats were reserved for Norway, along with the surface ships being concentrated in Norwegian waters.

== Prelude ==
=== Operation Cerberus ===
Hitler preferred the Channel route and responsibility was delegated to Marine-Gruppenkommando West (Naval Command West, Admiral Alfred Saalwächter) for planning and operational directions; Ciliax was commander of the Brest Group (flagship, Scharnhorst). Care was taken to choose the best route to avoid British minefields and to steam at high speed. Minesweepers cleared channels through the British mines and marked them with buoys (from 3 to 9 February, Bomber Command laid 98 mines in the channels). U-boats were sent for meteorological observations and several destroyers steamed westward down the Channel to Brest to strengthen the escort screen. To have the longest period of darkness possible, the departure was to be four days before the new moon and at 7:30 p.m., to benefit from a spring tide flowing up the Channel, which would add speed and possibly lift the ships over mines.

Air cover was to be provided by the Luftwaffe and six destroyers would escort the Brest Group on the first leg, to be joined by ten E-boats at dawn; a mixture of E-boats, R-boats and small craft would join at Cap Gris Nez. During January, the Kriegsmarine and Luftwaffe rehearsed for the operation but the ships had lost seaworthiness and many technicians and experts had been transferred from Brest to more pressing duties. By 9 February, the ships had completed their trials in Brest roads and the sortie was set for 11 February. Morale of the crews was high, no sabotage had occurred at Brest and the crews went ashore freely. Among locals there was no doubt that the ships were preparing to depart and as a deception, tropical helmets were brought on board, French dock workers loaded oil barrels marked "For Use in the Tropics" and false rumours were spread around town.

==== Unternehmen Donnerkeil ====
Hans Jeschonnek, Luftwaffe chief of staff, refused to guarantee the success of Cerberus or to reinforce the fighter forces in the west. Adolf Galland was given command of the air operation, to be called Unternehmen Donnerkeil (Operation Thunderbolt). Details of the plan were arranged with Oberst (Colonel) Karl Koller, chief of staff of Luftflotte 3 (Air Fleet 3 Generalfeldmarschall Hugo Sperrle). Some training units were mobilised to make up for the bulk of the Jagdwaffe being absent in the Soviet Union. The Funkhorchdienst (signals intelligence service, General Wolfgang Martini) attempted to jam British radio-telephone frequencies by using a technique to increase atmospheric interference and reduced the performance of British coastal radars by slowly increasing their jamming. Dornier Do 217s of Kampfgeschwader 2 (Bomber Wing 2) were to fly electronic deception sorties over the western Channel to divert British aircraft. Fliegerkorps IX (General der Flieger [Air Force General] Joachim Coeler) prepared to bomb RAF bases in south-western England and to attack British naval forces attempting to intercept the Brest Group. Fernaufklärungsgruppe 123 (Long-range Reconnaissance Wing 123) was to keep watch on both ends of the Channel and support Fliegerkorps IX.

The convoy route was divided into three sectors using the Jafü (Fighter Sector) boundaries but to ensure local control Max Ibel, the former commander of Jagdgeschwader 27 (Fighter Group 27) was appointed Jagdfliegerführer Schiff (Jafü Schiff, Fighter Controller: Ship) and embarked on Scharnhorst as a signals officer to communicate with Luftwaffe units during the operation. Eight rehearsals, involving around 450 sorties, were made from 22 January to 10 February. The Jagdgeschwader (day fighter wings) and the night fighters of Nachtjagdgeschwader 1 (Night Fighter Wing 1), were swiftly to prepare aircraft for the next sortie by rearming and refuelling in no more than thirty minutes. Galland decided that the aircraft should fly high and low cover, the low groups flying under British coastal radar. A standing patrol of least 16 fighters was to be maintained, in two formations of eight aircraft for their patrol altitudes, with each formation in two Schwärme of four aircraft. One Schwarm was to fly out to sea and one towards land in a zigzag and all Schwärme were to fly back and forth along the line of ships in wide figures of eight, in radio silence. Every sortie was timed to allow the fighters 30 minutes over the ships, just enough time for relieved units to refuel, rearm and return. During Donnerkeil, the relieving sortie arrived after only 20 minutes which meant that fighter cover for half the dash would be 32 fighters.

=== Operation Fuller ===
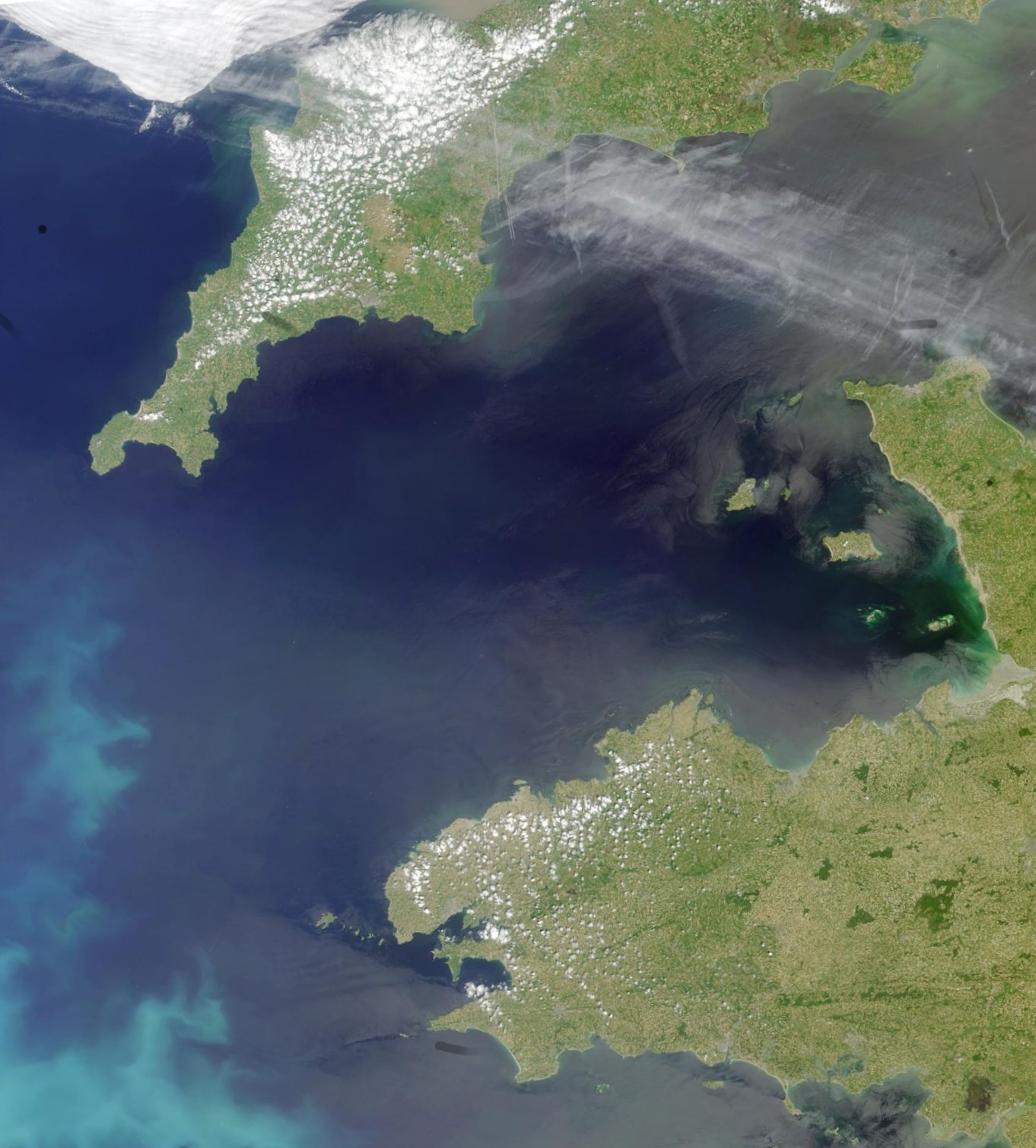
Satellite photograph of the western English Channel between south-west England and north-west France

In April 1941, the Royal Navy and the RAF devised Operation Fuller, a plan for combined operations against the ships in Brest should they sortie. Vice-Admiral Bertram Ramsay of the Dover Command was to be responsible for operations to confront a German squadron sailing up the Channel, with continuous co-ordinated attacks by Coastal Command, the Navy and RAF. British coastal radar had a range of about 80 nmi (92 mi; 150 km) and with the five standing air patrols, the planners expected a dash up the Channel easily to be discovered, even at night or in bad weather. As soon as the alarm was raised, the offensive provisions of Fuller would begin. The 32 Motor Torpedo Boats of the Dover and Ramsgate flotillas, with a Motor Gun Boat (MGB) escort, would make torpedo attacks from 4,000 yd (2.3 mi; 3.7 km). The boats would be followed up by Fairey Swordfish torpedo-bombers with fighter escorts and by Beaufort torpedo-bombers; the coastal guns at Dover would fire for as long as the ships were in range; Bomber Command would attack any ship damaged enough to have been slowed or brought to a stop.

As the German ships moved beyond the Straits of Dover, six Harwich-based destroyers of the Nore Command would make torpedo attacks and the RAF would continue bombing and also lay mines in the paths of the ships. Bomber Command intended to have 100 aircraft at four hours' notice (about 1/3 of its operational strength), by reserving around 20 aircraft from each group. Of the other 200 aircraft, half would continue operations against Germany and the rest would be preparing for operations next day. The aircraft reserved for Fuller were rotated and weather permitting, 20–25 would bomb Brest. Fighter Command would escort the torpedo-bombers with fighters from 10 Group in the south-west and the 16 fighter squadrons of 11 Group in the south-east. Each service arm had exchanged liaison officers at headquarters and operations rooms but did not use a common communications system.

==== Readiness ====
Brest Roads (Rade de Brest)

The preliminaries of the German manoeuvre, especially minesweeping in the Channel and the transit of destroyers to Brest, led the Admiralty to issue a forecast that a sortie into the Atlantic was improbable and that a move to sheltered waters by a dash up the Channel rather than via the Denmark Strait or into the Mediterranean to Italian ports was to be expected. Next day the Nore Command was ordered to keep six destroyers on call in the Thames and be ready to send six torpedo boats to reinforce those at Dover. The fast Abdiel-class minelayers HMS Manxman and HMS Welshman were detached to Plymouth Command to mine the Brest approaches and to Dover to mine the eastern exit of the Channel respectively. Most submarines were in the Mediterranean but two training boats were sent into the Bay of Biscay. On 6 February, HMS Sealion, the only modern submarine in home waters, was allowed to sail into Brest Roads, the commander using information supplied through Ultra on minefields, swept channels and training areas.

The six operational Swordfish torpedo-bombers of 825 Squadron FAA (Lieutenant-Commander Eugene Esmonde) were moved from RNAS Lee-on-Solent to RAF Manston in Kent, closer to Dover. The RAF alerted its forces involved in Operation Fuller to indefinite readiness and on 3 February, 19 Group, Coastal Command began night reconnaissance patrols by Air to Surface Vessel Mk II radar (ASV) equipped Lockheed Hudsons, supposedly able to detect ships at 30 nmi (35 mi; 56 km) range. Patrol line Stopper was already being flown off Brest and Line South East from Ushant to the Île-de-Bréhat and Habo from Le Havre to Boulogne began. Coastal Command had three Beaufort torpedo-bomber squadrons in Britain, 42 Squadron at RAF Leuchars in Scotland, 12 Beauforts of 86 Squadron and 217 Squadron in Cornwall and seven 217 Squadron aircraft at Thorney Island (Portsmouth). Two days later, Enigma showed that Ciliax had joined Scharnhorst and with the recent exercises, led the Admiralty to predict an impending departure. On 8 February, in a break in the weather, PR found that the ships were still in harbour, Scharnhorst was in dock and that another two destroyers had arrived.

Air Chief Marshal Philip Joubert de la Ferté, the Air Officer Commanding (AOC) Coastal Command, sent an appreciation to Fighter and Bomber commands, that a sortie could be expected any time after 10 February. The Coastal Command groups were alerted and 42 Squadron was ordered to fly its 14 Beauforts south to Norfolk (the move was delayed until next day by snow on the airfields in East Anglia). Air Vice Marshal Jack Baldwin, AOC Bomber Command, stood down half of its bombers and reduced the other 100 aircraft from four to two hours' notice, without informing the Admiralty. On 11 February, Sealion moved towards Brest on the afternoon tide, found nothing and returned at 8:35 p.m. to re-charge batteries, ready for another try the next day. The German ships had been scheduled to depart Brest at 7:30 p.m. but were delayed by a Bomber Command raid, which had been ordered after photo-reconnaissance had found the ships still in harbour with torpedo nets deployed at 4:15 p.m. For the previous week, Enigma had been providing information that the Germans were minesweeping on a route that made a dash up the Channel a certainty and with reference to captured charts gave away the German route, which was passed on by the Admiralty at 12:29 p.m. on 12 February. (The daily naval Enigma Home Waters settings for 10–12 February took Bletchley Park until 15 February to break.)

== Battle ==
=== Night, 11/12 February ===
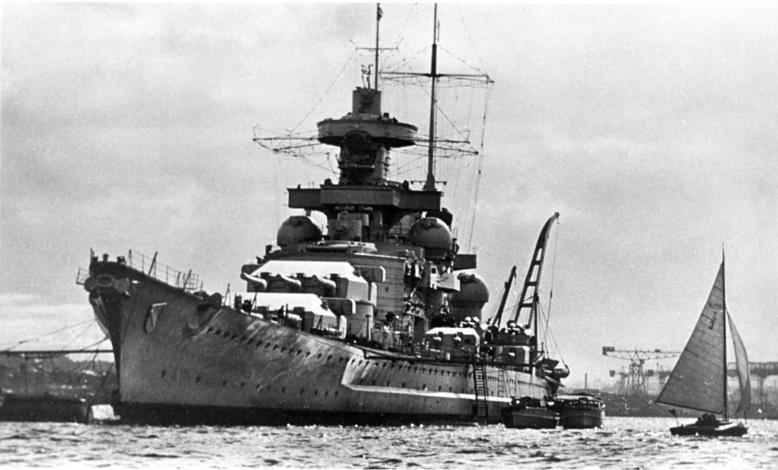
Scharnhorst in 1939

The ships at Brest were scheduled to depart at 8:30 p.m. on 11 February but an air raid by 18 Wellington bombers delayed the departure. The all clear sounded at 10:15 p.m. and Scharnhorst, Gneisenau and Prinz Eugen, accompanied by six destroyers sailed thirty minutes later. A British agent in Brest was unable to signal that the Brest Group was departing because of German wireless jamming; Sealion, patrolling outside the harbour, had withdrawn to recharge its batteries. (Note: Reginald Jones wrote that the signal from Brest had been received on the night of 11/12 February but that the duty officer neglected to pass this information on because he claimed he had already read it in a London evening paper and assumed that the Admiralty already knew of it.)

Patrol Stopper, near Brest, was being flown by an ASV Hudson from 224 Squadron when the Brest Group began assembling outside the port. At the patrol height of 1,000–2,000 ft (300–610 m) the ASV had a range of about 13 nmi (15 mi; 24 km) but the Hudson was flying south-west as the ships turned towards Ushant and received no contact. The last eight minutes of the next Stopper sortie came within about 9 nmi (10 mi; 17 km) of the ships but received no contact on the radar.

Line South East ran past Ushant to the vicinity of Jersey, to find a sortie from Brest which had turned up the Channel. The Brest Group crossed Line South East at 0:50am on 12 February, but the Hudson patrol was not there, having been ordered to return when its ASV failed. Joubert was short of aircraft and sent no replacement, also because Stopper had reported nothing untoward and if the Brest Group had sailed before Stopper began, it would already have passed Line South East. Habo, the third patrol line, from Cherbourg to Boulogne was conducted as usual, until a dawn fog was forecast over British airfields and the aircraft was called back at 6:30am, when the Brest Group was still west of the line. (Note: Stopper was usually conducted by four consecutive flights but this night, the ASV on the first Hudson broke down and the crew flew back to change to a spare, putting back the 7:30 p.m. start until 10:38 p.m. The Board of Enquiry found that the German ships had sailed through the Stopper patrol line before it was re-established but this was later found to be untrue, the delayed patrol had begun before the Brest Group sailed.)

=== 12 February ===
==== Morning ====
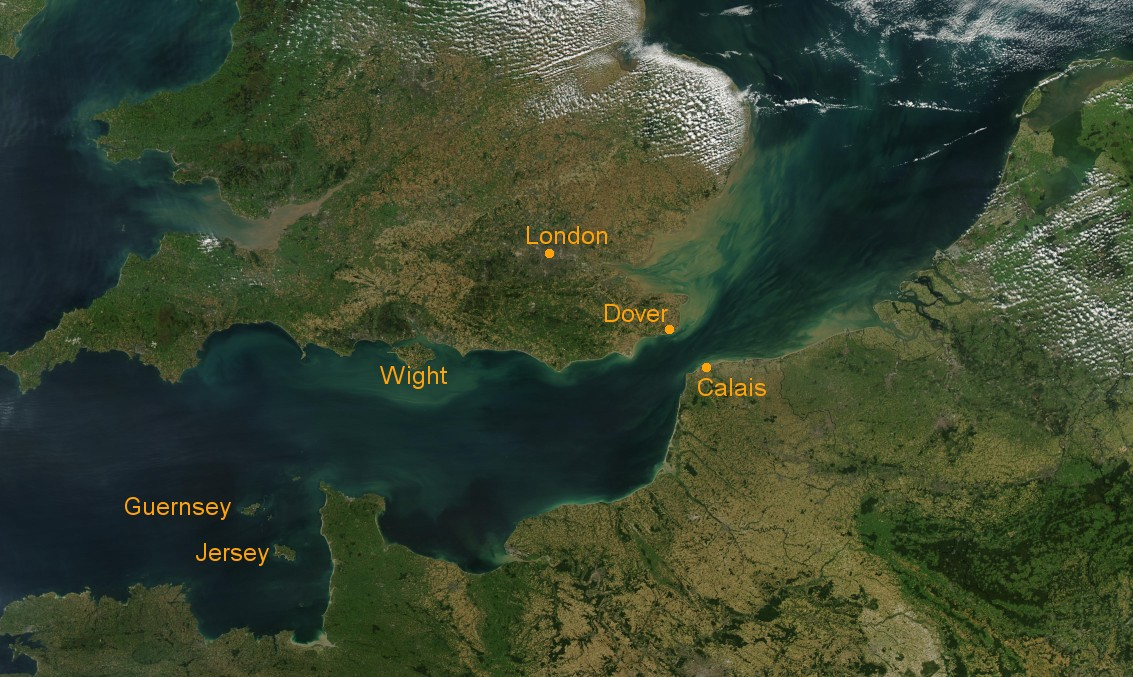
Satellite image of the English Channel (2002)

The only patrol over the Channel was the routine dawn patrol by Fighter Command from Ostend, south to the mouth of the Somme, which the Brest Group passed at 10:00 a.m. From 8:25 to 9:59 a.m., RAF radar operators under Squadron Leader Bill Igoe, using an un-jammed radar frequency, noticed four plots of German aircraft circling in places north of Le Havre, which at first were thought to be air-sea rescue operations. At 10:00 a.m. 11 Group RAF Fighter Command realised that the plots were moving north-east at 20–25 kn (37–46 km/h; 23–29 mph) and sent two Spitfires to reconnoitre at 10:20 a.m., about the time that news reached Fighter Command headquarters that radar-jamming had begun at 9:20 a.m. and that the station at Beachy Head was detecting surface ships. Radar stations in Kent reported two large ships off Le Touquet at 10:52 a.m. and when the Spitfire patrol landed at 10:50 a.m., having kept radio silence, the pilots reported a flotilla off Le Touquet (near Boulogne) but not the capital ships.

News of the sighting was rushed to 11 Group and the Navy at Dover by 11:05 a.m. (One pilot then mentioned a big ship and a certain sighting was received as he was being debriefed.) By coincidence, two senior fighter pilots from RAF Kenley had decided to fly an intruder mission to the French coast at 10:10 a.m., while the other pilots were grounded due to the bad weather. The pair spotted two Messerschmitt Bf 109s (Bf 109) and attacked, then found themselves over two big ships, a destroyer screen and an outer ring of E-boats. The Spitfires were dived on by about 12 German fighters and escaped through anti-aircraft fire from the ships, strafed an E-boat and made off at wave-top height. After they landed at 11:09 a.m., the pilots reported that the German ships had been 16 nmi (18 mi; 30 km) off Le Touquet at 10:42 a.m. By 11:25 a.m., the alarm had been raised that the Brest Group was entering the Straits of Dover with air cover.

At 11:27 a.m. Bomber Command had been alerted that the Brest Group was near Dover and warned the groups to be ready. Including aircraft that had flown the night before and those at four hours' notice, Air Marshal Richard Peirse had about 250 aircraft but the 100 bombers on two hours' notice had been loaded with semi-armour-piercing bombs which were effective only if dropped from 7,000 ft (2,100 m) or higher. Visibility was poor with rain and 8/10ths to 10/10ths cloud cover, down to 700 ft (210 m) and unless there were breaks in the cloud just when needed the task was impossible. Peirse ordered general-purpose bombs to be loaded, which could only cause superficial blast damage and attacks at low altitude, in the hope that the attacks would distract the Brest Group as Coastal Command and the Navy made torpedo attacks.

==== Noon ====
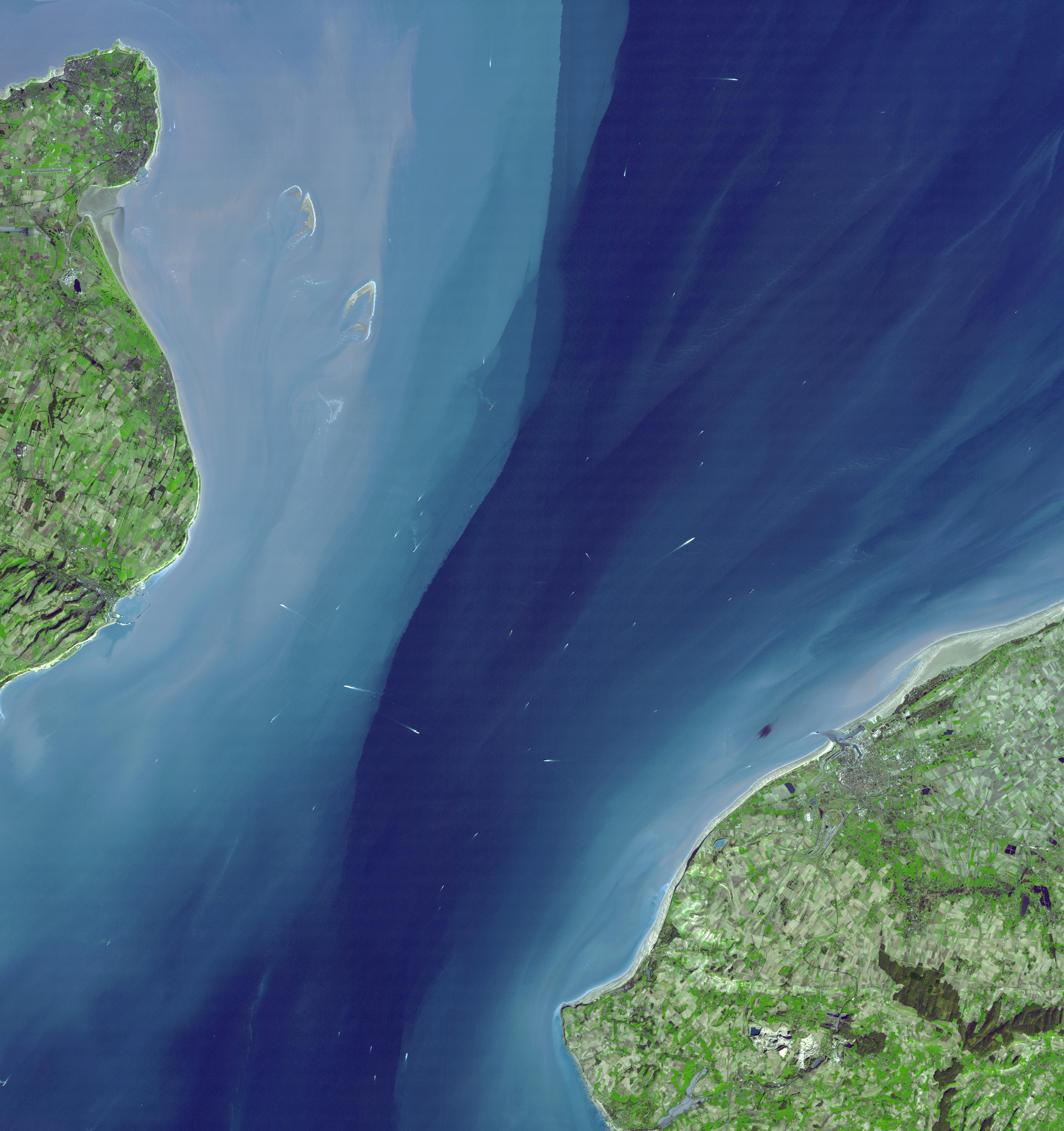
Satellite photograph of the Strait of Dover (NASA Terra Satellite image, March 2001)

At Dover in 1940, there were four 6 in (152 mm) guns with a range of 12,000 yd (11,000 m), two 9.2 in (234 mm) guns with a range of 18,000 yd (16,000 m), two modern 6-inch batteries with 25,000 yd (23,000 m) range and four more 9.2-inch guns on new mountings with a range of 31,600 yd (28,900 m) and then 36,300 yd (33,200 m) with supercharging. (After the fall of France, Axis ships could avoid the Dover mine barrage by sailing close to the French coast.) A supercharged naval 14 in (356 mm) gun could fire shells 48,000 yd (44,000 m) but was difficult to use against moving targets. The South Foreland Battery of the Dover guns, with their new K-type radar set, tracked the ships of the Brest Group coming up the Channel towards Cap Gris Nez.

At 12:19 p.m., the Dover guns fired their first salvo but with visibility down to 5 nmi (5.8 mi; 9.3 km), there could be no observation of the fall-of-shot. The gunners hoped that the radar would detect the shell splashes and allow corrections to be made, although this method had never been tried before. "Blips" on the K-set clearly showed the ships zig-zagging but not where the shells were landing. Full battery salvo firing began and the four 9.2-inch guns fired 33 rounds at the German ships, which were moving out of range at 30 kn (35 mph; 56 km/h) and all missed. German sources state that the fleet had already passed Dover when the coastal artillery opened fire and that the shells landed well astern of the major German units. The coastal guns ceased fire when light naval forces and torpedo-bombers began to attack and by 1:21 p.m. the German ships passed beyond the effective range of the British radar.

==== Afternoon ====
The six Swordfish torpedo-bombers of 825 Squadron FAA, took off from Manston at 12:20 p.m., after Esmonde decided that he could wait no longer, meeting the Spitfire escorts of 72 Squadron at 12:28 p.m., all setting off for a point 10 nmi (12 mi; 19 km) north of Calais. The escorts of 121 Squadron and 401 Squadron were late and tried to rendezvous en route to the ships but missed them and turned back to search for the Swordfish at Manston. The Spitfires of 72 Squadron flying close escort sighted the German ships at 12:40 p.m. but were bounced by Bf 109s and FW 190s and lost contact with the Swordfish. The first section of three torpedo-bombers pressed on through the destroyer screen and Esmonde's aircraft was shot down before he could launch his torpedo. The other two aircraft continued through the German anti-aircraft barrage, dropped torpedoes and then ditched their aircraft which had been hit by flak. The second section of three Swordfish were seen to cross over the destroyer screen and disappear in the cloud and smoke. (Note: Five of the six crew were rescued by small craft but the second section, with 13 aircrew was lost with all hands. The Spitfires of 121 Squadron and 401 Squadron found no Swordfish at Manston and flew back out to sea. Arriving a few minutes after the Swordfish attack, they encountered the covering German fighters and were engaged in an air battle. Esmonde had flown in the sinking of Bismarck and had been killed in the attack, for which he received a Victoria Cross posthumously. Ramsay later wrote, "In my opinion the gallant sortie of these six Swordfish aircraft constitutes one of the finest exhibitions of self-sacrifice and devotion to duty the war had ever witnessed", while Ciliax remarked on "...the mothball attack of a handful of ancient planes, piloted by men whose bravery surpasses any other action by either side that day".) While the German fighter escorts were absent, two sections (eight aircraft) of 452 Squadron RAAF strafed several German ships and silenced the return fire of a destroyer, for a cracked perspex hood to one Spitfire. (Note: Bluey Truscott was awarded a Bar to his DFC for this action.)

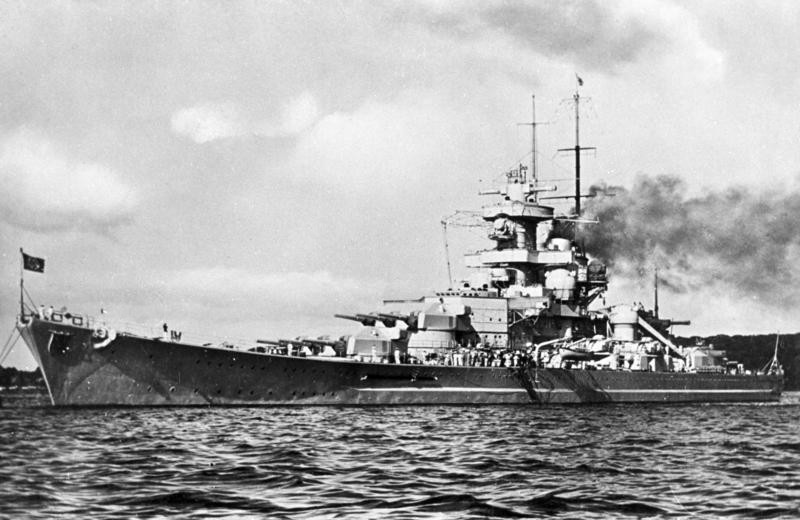
Gneisenau in 1939

The five operational Motor Torpedo Boats (MTBs) based at Dover left harbour at 11:55 a.m. and sighted the German warships at 12:23 p.m. The RAF fighter cover for this attack was not airborne in time, one MTB had engine-trouble and the rest found their approach blocked by twelve E-boats in two lines. The defective MTB fired torpedoes at the extreme range of 4,000 yd (2.0 nmi; 2.3 mi; 3.7 km) before returning to Dover; the rest were not able to get much closer and torpedoed through the gap between the E-boat lines, mistakenly claiming a hit on Prinz Eugen. Two motor gun boats (MGBs) arrived from Dover in time to defend the last MTB from a German Narvik-class destroyer. Two more MTBs had left Ramsgate at 12:25 p.m. but approached from too far astern of the German squadron and were unable to get into a position to attack before deteriorating weather and engine problems forced them to turn back. Several Whirlwind fighters on a routine patrol were intercepted by the fighter screen at 2:00 p.m.

The seven Beauforts at Thorney Island were closest to the Brest Group when it was sighted. Two Beauforts had been bombed up and one went unserviceable, before the other four took off at 1:25 p.m. The four Beauforts were late to meet their fighter escorts at Manston and the torpedo-bombers and fighters were ordered independently to the German ships. The position, course and speed of the Brest Group was given by voice (R/T) to the Spitfires and Morse (W/T) to the Beauforts. The torpedo-bombers failed to receive the orders, because 16 Group forgot that they had been fitted with R/T for Operation Fuller. When the Beauforts reached Manston they circled with numerous fighters which appeared to ignore them. Two Beauforts flew to the French coast, found nothing and landed at Manston where the confusion was resolved. The other two aircraft had already landed at Manston, where the crews found out what was going on and set off for the Belgian coast, arriving at 3:40 p.m. (when the Nore Command destroyers were attacking). Both bombers flew through the German flak and attacked Prinz Eugen, dropping their torpedoes at 1,000 yd (910 m), to no effect.

The 42 Squadron Beauforts from Scotland had to divert to RAF Coltishall in Norfolk because of snow but the torpedoes to be loaded were over 100 miles away at RAF North Coates in Lincolnshire and came by road too late. Nine of the aircraft had flown south with torpedoes on and took off at 2:25 p.m., leaving the other four behind to rendezvous with their fighter escorts and several Hudsons, intended to create a diversion. The Beauforts reached Manston at 2:50 p.m. and tried to formate behind the Hudsons, which did the same thing; attempts to get the fighters to join the formation also failed. The Beaufort crews had been briefed that they would be escorted all the way, the fighters that they were to cover the Dover Strait in general and the aircraft circled Manston for thirty minutes, each formation under the impression that another one was leading. The Beaufort commander then set off, using the position of the Brest Group given at Coltishall and six Hudsons followed, the other five circling and waiting for the fighters, before giving up and landing at 4:00 p.m.

The Beauforts and Hudsons flew towards the Dutch coast and lost touch in the cloud and rain but the Hudsons made ASV contact and attacked the ships, two being shot down for no result. Six of the Beauforts then attacked through the flak and released their torpedoes, also with no effect. (The other three Beauforts had already attacked, possibly against British destroyers.) The two 217 Squadron Beauforts that had flown earlier had reached Manston, set off again independently and made ASV contact, attacking Scharnhorst at 5:10 and 6:00 p.m. The remaining Beauforts at St Eval in Cornwall had been sent to Thorney Island, arriving at 2:30 p.m. to refuel and be briefed to link with fighters at Coltishall in East Anglia, where they arrived at 5:00 p.m. to find no escorts waiting. The Beauforts pressed on to a position sent by wireless and at 6:05 p.m., as dark fell, with visibility down to 1,000 yd (910 m) and the cloud base at only 600 ft (180 m) saw four German minesweepers. One bomber attacked a "big ship" but flak damage jammed the torpedo and as night fell around 6:30 p.m., the rest turned for Coltishall; two Beauforts were lost to flak or the weather. (Note: Coastal Command aircraft with ASV independently shadowed the Brest Group from 4:00 p.m., gained two sightings, then several ASV contacts after dark, one at 1:55 a.m. on 13 February, showing that the Brest Group had split up but the information was too late to use.)

==== Evening ====
Southern North Sea

The first wave of 73 Avro Manchester, Halifax and Stirling heavy bombers took off from 2:20 p.m. and most found the target area from 2:55 to 3:58 p.m. Thick low cloud and intermittent rain hid the view and only ten crews could see the German ships for long enough to bomb. The 134 bombers of the second wave took off from 2:37 p.m. and reached the vicinity of the ships from 4:00 to 5:06 p.m. and at least 20 bombed. The last wave of 35 aircraft began at 4:15 p.m. and reached the Brest Group from 5:50 to 6:15 p.m. and nine were able to drop their bombs. Only 39 of the aircraft that returned managed to attack the ships and 15 bombers were shot down by flak or lost after flying into the sea; twenty bombers were damaged and no hits were achieved.

The destroyers HMS Campbell and Vivacious of the 21st Flotilla and HMS Mackay, Whitshed, Walpole and Worcester of the 16th Flotilla (Captain Charles Pizey) from Nore Command were First World War-vintage ships and usually escorted east coast convoys. The ships were practising gunnery off Orford Ness in the North Sea when alerted at 11:56 a.m. The destroyers sailed south to intercept the Brest Group but it steamed much faster than expected and to catch up, Pizey took the destroyers over a German minefield. At 2:31 p.m., just before the destroyers attacked, north of the Scheldt Estuary, Scharnhorst had hit a mine and was stopped for a short time, before resuming at about 25 kn (29 mph; 46 km/h). At 3:17 p.m. the destroyers made radar contact at 9 nmi (10 mi; 17 km) and visual contact at 4 nmi (4.6 mi; 7.4 km) at 3:43 p.m. Walpole had already dropped out with engine trouble; as the other five emerged from the murk, they were immediately engaged by the German ships. The destroyers pressed on to 3,000 yd (1.5 nmi; 1.7 mi; 2.7 km) and two destroyers fired torpedoes; Worcester closed further and was hit by return fire from Gneisenau and Prinz Eugen, then the last two destroyers attacked but all their torpedoes missed. (Note: Several salvoes from Gneisenau hit Worcester, destroyed the starboard side of the bridge and No.1 and No.2 boiler rooms. Prinz Eugen hit the destroyer a four times, setting it on fire, then Captain Fein, aboard Gneisenau, ordered firing to cease, believing the destroyer to be sinking; Worcester limped to Harwich at 6.5 kn (7.5 mph; 12.0 km/h).)

==== Night 12/13 and 13 February ====
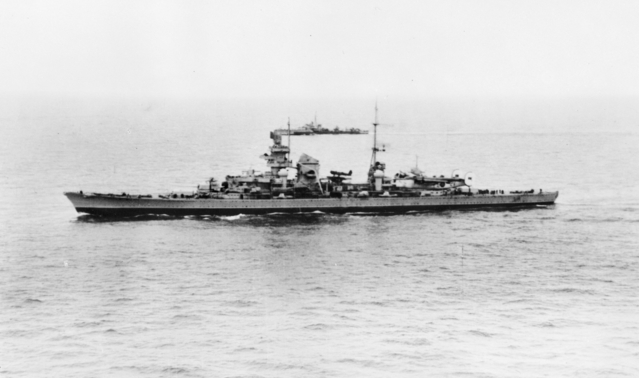
Prinz Eugen (May 1945)

Scharnhorst had fallen behind after hitting a mine and at 7:55 p.m., Gneisenau hit a magnetic mine off Terschelling. The mine exploded some distance from the ship, making a small hole on the starboard side and temporarily knocking a turbine out of action. After about thirty minutes, the ship continued at about 25 kn (29 mph; 46 km/h) and as Scharnhorst sailed through the same area, it hit another mine at 9:34 p.m, both main engines stopped, steering was lost and fire control was damaged. The ship got under way with the starboard engines at 10:23 p.m., making 12 kn (14 mph; 22 km/h) and carrying about 1,000 long tons (1,016 t) of seawater. Scharnhorst arrived at Wilhelmshaven at 10:00 a.m. on 13 February, with damage that took three months to repair. Gneisenau and Prinz Eugen reached the Elbe at 7:00 a.m. and tied up at Brunsbüttel North Locks at 9:30 a.m. After receiving Ultra intelligence about German minesweeping in the German Bight, Bomber Command had laid 69 magnetic mines along the swept channel on 6 February and 25 mines the next day. When the route of the channel was more accurately plotted on 11 February, four mines were laid, then more on 12 February when the Channel Dash was on. Enigma decrypts revealed the mining of the German ships but the news was kept secret by the British to protect the source.

== Aftermath ==
=== Analysis ===
Ciliax sent a signal to Admiral Saalwächter in Paris on 13 February,

It is my duty to inform you that Operation Cerberus has been successfully completed. Lists of damage and casualties follow.

— Ciliax (13 February 1942)

OKM called Cerberus a tactical victory and a strategic defeat. In 2012, Ken Ford wrote that the German ships had exchanged one prison for another and that Bomber Command raids from 25 to 27 February, terminally damaged Gneisenau. Operation Fuller had failed, a British destroyer had been severely damaged and 42 aircraft had been lost in 398 RAF fighter, 242 bomber and 35 Coastal Command sorties.

British public opinion was appalled and British prestige suffered at home and abroad. A leading article in The Times read,

Vice Admiral Ciliax has succeeded where the Duke of Medina Sidonia failed. Nothing more mortifying to the pride of our sea-power has happened since the seventeenth century. [...] It spelled the end of the Royal Navy legend that in wartime no enemy battle fleet could pass through what we proudly call the English Channel.

— The Times (14 February 1942)

In 1955, Hans Dieter Berenbrok, a former Kriegsmarine officer, writing under the pseudonym Cajus Bekker, judged the operation a necessity and a success. He quoted Raeder "…we are all convinced we cannot leave the ships in Brest any longer". Raeder wrote that the operation was necessary because of a lack of training opportunities for the crews, lack of battle experience and the general situation made raiding operations in the "old pattern out of the question". According to Bekker, Hitler and Raeder shared the conviction that if the ships remained in Brest that they would eventually be disabled by British air raids.

Stephen Roskill, the British naval official historian, wrote in 1956 that the German verdict was accurate. Hitler had exchanged the threat to British Atlantic convoys for a defensive deployment near Norway against a threat that never materialised. Roskill wrote that the British had misjudged the time of day when the German ships would sail but this mistake was less influential than the circumstantial failures of Coastal Command reconnaissance to detect the ships which had been at sea for 12 hours, four of them after dawn had broken, before the alarm was raised. Churchill ordered a Board of Enquiry (under Sir Alfred Bucknill), which criticised Coastal Command for failing to ensure that a dawn reconnaissance was flown to compensate for the problems of the night patrols off Brest and from Ushant to the Isle de Bréhat. The inquiry also held that there should have been more suspicion of the German radar jamming on the morning of 12 February and that involving Bomber Command in an operation for which it was untrained was a mistake.

The board found that the delay in detecting the German ships led to the British attacks being made piecemeal, against formidable German defensive arrangements and that the few aircraft and ships that found the group were "cut to pieces". In 2012, Ken Ford wrote that the inquiry was, perforce, a whitewash, blaming instrument failures rather than incompetence but the report was still kept secret until 1946. In 1991, John Buckley wrote that the ASV Hudsons had been forbidden to use flares off Brest, because of the presence of Sealion and that one of the technical faults to an ASV could have been repaired, had the operator carried out a fuse check properly. Joubert was criticised for complacency, in not sending replacement sorties, despite his earlier warning that the Brest Group was about to sail, because of the assumption in Operation Fuller since 6 April 1941, that a day sailing was certain,

...a classic example of befuddled tactical thinking, poor co-operation and almost non-existent co-ordination.

— Robertson

The Dash exposed many failings in RAF planning, that only three torpedo-bomber squadrons with 31 Beauforts were in Britain, that training had been limited by the lack of torpedoes and the example of Japanese tactics had been ignored. The effectiveness of Bomber Command against moving ships was shown to be negligible and the failure to ensure unity of command before Operation Fuller began, led to piecemeal attacks using unsuitable tactics.

R. V. Jones, Assistant Director of Intelligence (Science) at the Air Ministry during the war, wrote in his memoir, that for several days, army radar stations on the south coast had been jammed. Lieutenant-Colonel Wallace, a member of the army Radar Interception Unit, had reported this through the chain of command. On 11 February, Wallace had called for Jones to assist him in bringing attention to the German radar jamming. A gradual increase in the jamming had misled most operators to its intensity. Martini had unobtrusively made the British radar cover "almost useless". Jones quoted Francis Bacon,

Of Delayes
Nay, it were better, to meet some Dangers halfe way, though they come nothing neare, than to keepe too long a watch, upon their Approaches: For if a Man watch too long, it is odds that he will fall asleepe.

and included an anecdote of the chain of command breaking down under the shock of the Brest Group sailing so far up the Channel undiscovered. Air marshals were said to have sat on each other's desks, thinking of pilots they could telephone to find the ships; even after the Brest Group had been found, contact was lost several times. In 1955, Jones met Captain Giessler, the Navigating Officer on Scharnhorst, who said that the worst time in the operation was the thirty minutes that Scharnhorst was stationary, after hitting a mine just beyond Dover; in the low cloud none of the British aircraft found them. (Note: In 2013, Goodchild wrote that although Operation Fuller was a scientific and technological failure, Jones exaggerated for effect in his memoir. Too much had been expected of radar and German countermeasures had been underestimated, given earlier attempts to jam British radar in 1940 and British research into Window.) In the Official History of the Royal Canadian Air Force (1994) Brereton Greenhous et al. wrote that the Canadian 401 Squadron had been sent "to intervene in a battle between German E-boats and British MTBs"; 404 Squadron was ordered

...to maintain air superiority between 1430 and 1500 hrs whilst the main attack by Coastal and Bomber aircraft was taking place.

and 411 Squadron had been ordered on an "E-boat search". "The 'Channel block' had failed ignominiously".

In the German semi-official history Germany in the Second World War (2001), Werner Rahn wrote that the operation was a tactical success but that this could not disguise the fact of a strategic withdrawal. Brest was a location from which the Kriegsmarine had anticipated much success, especially after the Japanese entry into the war had diverted Allied resources to the Pacific, creating new opportunities for offensive action in the Atlantic. Rahn also noted that some members of the German Naval War Staff took the view that German war potential had reached its limit and that

Brest was strategic-operational wishful thinking which was not fulfilled, and could not be fulfilled in future owing to enemy air superiority.

In 2018, Craig Symonds wrote of the futility of keeping heavy units in Brest,

Those three ships had sat uselessly in Brest since the previous May, when Raeder’s grand scheme of concentrating a large surface force in the Atlantic had sunk along with the Bismarck. Since then, they had been bombed regularly and had made no contribution to the war beyond keeping the attention of the Royal Navy and the RAF.

Scharnhorst later joined Tirpitz in Norwegian waters as a threat to Allied Arctic convoys of World War II supplying the USSR.

=== Casualties ===
British aircraft losses to the Luftwaffe were two Blenheims, four Whirlwinds, four Wellingtons, six Hurricanes, nine Hampdens and ten Spitfires. Kriegsmarine gunners shot down all six Swordfish and a Hampden bomber. Worcester lost 23 men killed, four died of wounds and 45 wounded of the complement of 130; the ship was out of action for 14 weeks. In 2014, Steve Brew recorded 230–250 killed and wounded. The Kriegsmarine torpedo boats Jaguar and T. 13 were damaged by bombing, two sailors were killed and several men were badly wounded by bomb splinters and small-arms fire; the Luftwaffe lost 17 aircraft and eleven pilots. In 1996, Donald Caldwell gave 23 aircrew killed, four being fighter pilots from Jagdgeschwader 26 and that 22 Luftwaffe aircraft were shot down, of which seven were fighters.

=== Subsequent operations ===
German Bight and Baltic coast (1990 German borders)

Gneisenau entered a floating dry dock at Kiel and was hit twice by RAF bombers, on the night of 26/27 February. One bomb hit the battleship on her forecastle and penetrated the armoured deck. The explosion ignited a fire in the foremost magazine, which detonated, throwing the forward turret off its mount. The damage prompted the German Naval Staff to rebuild Gneisenau to mount the six 38 cm (15 in) guns originally planned, rather than repair the ship and the damaged bow section was removed to attach a longer one. By early 1943, the ship had been sufficiently repaired to begin the conversion but after the failure of German surface forces at the Battle of the Barents Sea in December 1942, Hitler ordered the work to stop. On 23 February, Prinz Eugen was torpedoed by a British submarine off Norway and put out of action until October; then spent the rest of the war in the Baltic. On 28 March, the British raided St Nazaire in Operation Chariot and destroyed the Normandie dock, the only one in France capable of accommodating the largest German warships. Scharnhorst participated in Operation Zitronella against Spitzbergen on 8 September 1943 and was sunk at the Battle of the North Cape on 26 December.

== Memorial and commemorations ==
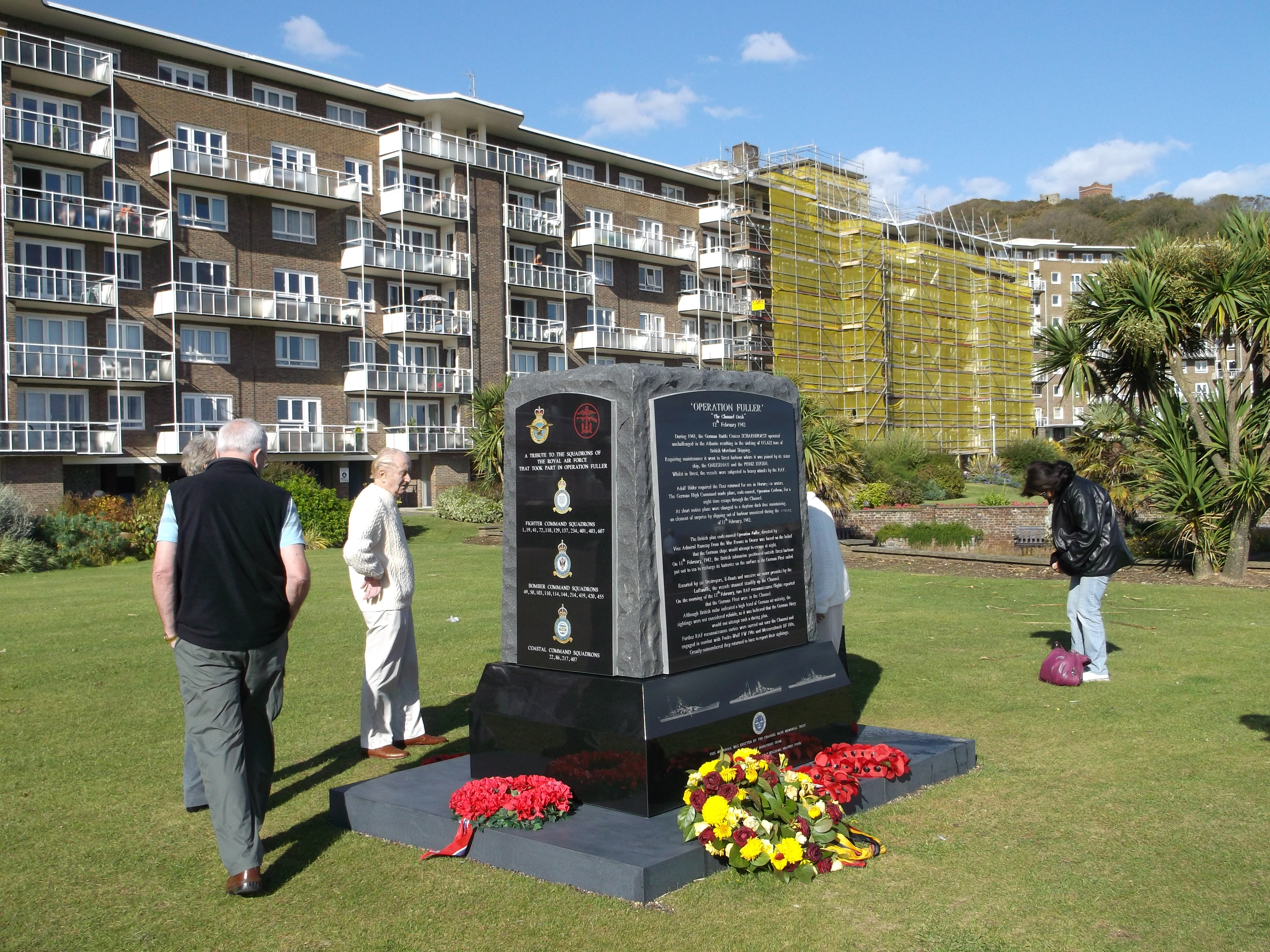
Operation Fuller Memorial, Marine Parade Gardens, Dover

A granite memorial to all Britons involved in Operation Fuller was erected in Marine Parade Gardens in Dover, to mark the 70th anniversary of the event in 2012. Sailors from HMS Kent provided a guard of honour as part of the parade held to mark the unveiling.

On 10 February 2017, at the Fleet Air Arm memorial church at RNAS Yeovilton (HMS Heron), a ceremony and flypast by four Wildcat HMA2 helicopters of 825 Naval Air Squadron was conducted, marking the 75th anniversary of Lieutenant-Commander Esmonde and 825 Naval Air Squadron's attack.

== See also ==
- Operation Kita

== Bibliography ==
=== Books ===
- Barker, Ralph (2009). Ship-Busters! A classic account of RAF torpedo-bombers in WWII. London: Grub Street. ISBN 978-1-90-650229-4.
- Bekker, C. D. (pseud. Hans Dieter Berenbrok) (1955). Defeat at Sea: The Struggle and Eventual Destruction of the German Navy, 1939–1945 [Kampf und Untergang der Kriegsmarine] (Eng. trans. ed.). New York: Henry Holt and Company. OCLC 786159847.
- Boog, H.; Rahn, W.; Stumpf, R.; Wegner, B. (2001). Osers, E. (ed.). The Global War: Widening of the Conflict into a World War and the Shift of the Initiative 1941–1943. Germany and the Second World War. Vol. VI. Translated by Osers, E.; Brownjohn, J.; Crampton, P.; Willmott, L. (Eng. trans. Clarendon Press, Oxford ed.). Potsdam: Militärgeschichtliches Forschungsamt (Research Institute for Military History). pp. 351–425. ISBN 0-19-822888-0.
  - Rahn, W. "Part III: 3, The Conduct of the War in the Atlantic and the coastal Area. c. The Fourth Phase, January–July 1942: Operations Affected by America's Entry into the War". In Boog et al. (2001).
- Brew, Steve (2014). Blood, Sweat and Courage: 41 Squadron RAF 1939–1942. Stroud: Fonthill Media. ISBN 978-1-78155-296-4.
- Breyer, Siegfried (1990). The German Battleship Gneisenau. West Chester, PA: Schiffer. ISBN 978-0-88740-290-6.
- Caldwell, D. L. (1996). JG 26 War Diary: 1939–1942. Vol. I. London: Grub Street. ISBN 978-1-898697-52-7.
- Collier, B. (2004) [1957]. Butler, J. R. M. (ed.). The Defence of the United Kingdom. History of the Second World War United Kingdom Military Series (Naval & Military Press ed.). London: HMSO. ISBN 978-1-845-74055-9. Archived from the original on 28 January 2015.
- Flugzeug Classic Jahrbuch 2013. München: GeraMond Verlag. December 2012. ISBN 978-3-86245-412-9.
- Ford, Ken (2012). Run The Gauntlet; The Channel Dash 1942. Raid. Osprey. ISBN 978-1-84908-570-0.
- Garzke, William H.; Dulin, Robert O. (1985). Battleships: Axis and Neutral Battleships in World War II. Annapolis, MD: Naval Institute Press. ISBN 978-0-87021-101-0.
- Greenhous, B.; Harris, S. J.; Johnston, W. C.; Rawling, W. G. P. (1994). The Official History of the Royal Canadian Air Force: The Crucible of War, 1939–1945. Vol. III. Toronto: University of Toronto Press and Department of National Defence. ISBN 978-0-8020-0574-8. D2-63/3-1994E.
- Hellwinkel, Lars (2014). Hitler's Gateway to the Atlantic, German Naval Bases in France 1940–1945. Barnsley: Seaforth. ISBN 978-1-84-832199-1.
- Hendrie, A. W. A. (2010). The Cinderella Service: Coastal Command 1939–1945. Barnsley: Pen & Sword Aviation. ISBN 978-1-84884-202-1.
- Hinsley, F. H.; et al. (1979). British Intelligence in the Second World War: Its influence on Strategy and Operations. History of the Second World War. Vol. I. London: HMSO. ISBN 978-0-11-630933-4.
- Hinsley, F. H. (1994) [1993]. British Intelligence in the Second World War. Its influence on Strategy and Operations. History of the Second World War. abridged (2nd rev. ed.). London: HMSO. ISBN 978-0-11-630961-7.
- H. M. Ships Damaged or Sunk by Enemy Action, 3rd September, 1939 to 2nd September, 1945 (PDF). London: HMSO (Admiralty: Director of Naval Construction). 1952. OCLC 38570200. Archived from the original (PDF) on 10 June 2016.
- Hooton, E. R. (1994). Phoenix Triumphant: The Rise and Rise of the Luftwaffe. London: Arms & Armour Press. ISBN 978-1-86019-964-6 – via Archive Foundation.
- Hooton, E. R. (2010). The Luftwaffe: A Study in Air Power, 1933–1945. London: Classic. ISBN 978-1-906537-18-0.
- Jones, R. V. (1998) [1978]. Most Secret War. Wordsworth Military Library (pbk. repr. Wordsworth, Ware [Herts] ed.). London: Hamish Hamilton. ISBN 978-1-85326-699-7.
- Kemp, P. K. (1957). Victory at Sea 1939–1945. London: Frederick Muller. OCLC 5588670.
- Koop, Gerhard; Schmolke, Klaus-Peter (2014) [1999]. Battleships of the Scharnhorst Class (2nd, Seaforth ed.). Greenhill Books. ISBN 978-1-84832-192-2.
- Macintyre, Donald (1971). The Naval War against Hitler. New York: Charles Scribner's Sons. ISBN 978-0-684-12375-2 – via Archive Foundation.
- Martienssen, Anthony K. (1949). Hitler and his Admirals. New York: E. P. Dutton. OCLC 562130.
- Middlebrook, M.; Everitt, C. (2014) [1985]. The Bomber Command War Diaries: An Operational Reference Book 1939–1945 ([online scan] 2nd repr. Pen & Sword Aviation, Barnsley ed.). London: Viking. ISBN 978-1-78346-360-2.
- Potter, J. D (1970). Fiasco: The Breakout of the German Battleships. London: Heinemann. ISBN 978-0-434-59801-4.
- Richards, Denis (1974) [1953]. "VI The Struggle at Sea: The First Battle of the Convoy Routes, the Anti-Shipping Offensive and the Escape of the 'Scharnhorst' and 'Gneisenau'". Royal Air Force 1939–1945: The Fight At Odds. History of the Second World War, Military Series. Vol. I (pbk. ed.). London: HMSO. pp. 94–116. ISBN 978-0-11-771592-9.
- Roskill, S. W. (1957) [1954]. Butler, J. R. M. (ed.). The War at Sea 1939–1945: The Defensive. History of the Second World War United Kingdom Military Series. Vol. I (4th impr. ed.). London: HMSO. OCLC 881709135. Archived from the original on 27 February 2022 – via Hyperwar Foundation.
- Roskill, S. W. (1962) [1957]. The War at Sea 1939–1945: The Period of Balance. History of the Second World War United Kingdom Military Series. Vol. II (3rd impr. ed.). London: HMSO. OCLC 174453986. Archived from the original on 6 March 2014 – via Hyperwar Foundation.
- Roskill, S. W. (2004) [1957]. The War at Sea 1939–1945: Period of Balance. History of the Second World War United Kingdom Military Series. Vol. II (repr. ed.). Uckfield: Naval & Military Press. ISBN 978-1-84342-804-6.
- Roskill, S. W. (1960). The War at Sea 1939–1945: The Offensive 1st June 1943 – 31st May 1944. History of the Second World War United Kingdom Military Series. Vol. III. Part I (1st ed.). London: HMSO. OCLC 277168049.
- Ruge, Friedrich (1957). Der Seekrieg: The German Navy's Story, 1939–1945. Annapolis, MD: United States Naval Institute. OCLC 2566680.
- Southall, I. (1958). 'Bluey Truscott': Squadron Leader Keith William Truscott, R.A.A.F., D.F.C. and Bar. Sydney: Angus & Robertson. OCLC 473683478.
- Symonds, Craig (2018). World War II at Sea. Oxford, U.K.: Oxford University Press. p. 259.
- Taylor, J. C. (1966). German Warships of World War II. New York, N.Y.: Doubleday and Company.
- Weal, J. (1996). Focke-Wulf Fw 190 Aces of the Western Front. Oxford: Osprey. ISBN 978-1-85532-595-1.
- Webster, C.; Frankland, N. (2006) [1961]. The Strategic Air Offensive against Germany, 1939–1945 Preparation: Parts 1, 2 and 3. History of the Second World War, Military Series. Vol. I (Naval and Military Press, Uckfield ed.). London: HMSO. ISBN 978-1-84574-347-5.
- Webster, C.; Frankland, N. (1961). Butler, J. R. M. (ed.). The Strategic Air Offensive Against Germany 1939–1945: Annexes and Appendices. History of the Second World War Military Series. Vol. IV (digital download ed.). London: HMSO. OCLC 932892823.
- Williamson, Gordon (2003). German Battleships 1939–45. Oxford: Osprey. ISBN 978-1-84176-498-6.

=== Theses ===
- Buckley, J. D. (1991). The Development of RAF Coastal Command Trade Defence Strategy, Policy and Doctrine 1919–1945 (PhD thesis). Lancaster University. pp. 356–365. OCLC 53531662. EThOS uk.bl.ethos.317333. Archived from the original on 23 October 2016.
- Goodchild, J. M. (2013). R. V. Jones and the Birth of Scientific Intelligence (PhD thesis). University of Exeter. OCLC 853508083. EThOS uk.bl.ethos.579986. Archived from the original on 24 October 2016.

=== Websites ===
- "75th Anniversary of Channel Dash heroes Commemorated". SeaWaves Magazine. North Vancouver, BC: SeaWaves Press. ISSN 1481-4315. Archived from the original on 25 August 2017.
