= Max Ibel =

German Luftwaffe general (1896–1981)

- Born: 2 January 1896; Munich, Kingdom of Bavaria, German Empire
- Died: 19 March 1981 (aged 85); Munich, West Germany
- Burial place: Munich Waldfriedhof
- Military career
- Allegiance: German Empire; Weimar Republic; Nazi Germany; West Germany
- Branch: Luftwaffe; German Air Force
- Service years: 1915–1945; 1957–1961
- Rank: Generalmajor (Wehrmacht); Brigadegeneral (Bundeswehr)
- Commands: JG 3, JG 27
- Conflicts: World War II: Operation Donnerkeil
- Awards: Knight's Cross of the Iron Cross
- Other work: Bundeswehr

Max Josef Ibel (2 January 1896 – 19 March 1981) is credited as one of the creators of the Luftwaffe. He was also a recipient of the Knight's Cross of the Iron Cross.

== Career ==
Ibel was born on 2 January 1896 in Munich, the capital of the Kingdom of Bavaria within the German Empire. He joined the Army as a cadet in July 1915, serving with the 1st Bavarian Pioneer battalion, and was commissioned as an officer in August 1916.

When the war ended he remained in the German Army, serving with the First Engineer Battalion in Munich, becoming adjutant in mid 1919. In July 1928 he left the Army for pilot training at the Lipetsk fighter-pilot school in the Soviet Union, where Luftwaffe aircrew were secretly trained.

After returning to Germany, in May 1932 Ibel was promoted to Hauptmann, and served as an Instructor with the flight school (Jagdfliegerschule) in Schleissheim.

In November 1935 he was promoted to Major.

In May 1936, he was transferred to command Jagdgeschwader 134 in Dortmund.

On 1 April 1936, I. Gruppe (1st group) of Jagdgeschwader 232 (JG 232—232nd Fighter Wing) a newly formed in Bernburg and placed under the command of Major Bruno Loerzer. The Gruppe was equipped with the Heinkel He 51 A and B, as well as with a few Arado Ar 65. In consequence, Ibel was appointed Staffelkapitän (squadron leader) of 1. Staffel (1st squadron) of JG 232. On 8 October, he was transferred to take command of 3. Staffel which had also been created on 1 April without appointing a Staffelkapitän. Command of 1. Staffel was passed on to Oberleutnant Fritz Schleif. On 15 March 1937, Ibel was transferred and tasked with the creation of I. Gruppe of Jagdgeschwader 135 (JG 135—135th Fighter Wing) at Bad Aibling, becoming the first Gruppenkommandeur (group commander). Initially, the Gruppe was also equipped with the He 51. In November, the Gruppe received the Messerschmitt Bf 109 B and the Bf 109 D-1 in March 1938. During the Anschluss in March 1938, (the unification between Germany and Austria) the Gruppe was briefly moved to Hörsching Airfield near Linz before returning to Bad Aibling on 30 April.

=== Wing commander ===
On 7 November 1938, Ibel was appointed Geschwaderkommodore (wing commander) of Jagdgeschwader 231 (JG 231—231st Fighter Wing) at Bernburg, which was equipped with the Bf 109 D-1. On 1 May 1939, the unit was renamed and from then on was known as Jagdgeschwader 3. On 26 August, JG 3 was ordered to relocate to Brandis near Leipzig, and tasked with protecting the central German industrial area. World War II in Europe began less than a week later on Friday 1 September when German forces invaded Poland. Following four weeks of relative inactivity, JG 3 was ordered to Münster-Handorf Airfield and Ibel was replaced by Oberstleutnant Carl Vieck as commander of JG 3.

At Münster-Handorf, Ibel was tasked with the creation of the newly formed Jagdgeschwader 27 (JG 27—27th Fighter Wing) on 1 October. The Geschwaderstab (headquarters unit) of JG 27 was created by splitting up the Geschwaderstab of JG 3, Ibel's former command, in two. Ibel was assigned Hauptmann Joachim Schlichting as his adjutant, replaced by Hauptmann Adolf Galland on 15 February 1940. He led JG 27 successfully during the Battle of France and the Battle of Britain until October 1940. Ibel was awarded the Knight's Cross of the Iron Cross (Ritterkreuz des Eisernen Kreuzes) on 22 August 1940 for his leadership of JG 27. On 10 October, Ibel transferred command of JG 27 to Major Bernhard Woldenga.

=== Luftwaffe commander ===
In October 1940, Ibel became commander of Jagdfliegerschule 4 (Fighter Pilot School), where he remained until June 1941. He was then promoted to Generalmajor, and appointed Jagdfliegerführer 3 (Jafü 3) in occupied France.

In February 1942, Ibel served as liaison officer with the Kriegsmarine in Operation Donnerkeil. The objective of this operation was to give the German battleships Scharnhorst and Gneisenau and the heavy cruiser Prinz Eugen fighter protection in the breakout from Brest to Germany. The Channel Dash operation (11–13 February 1942) by the Kriegsmarine was codenamed Operation Cerberus by the Germans. In support of this, the Luftwaffe, formulated an air superiority plan dubbed Operation Donnerkeil for the protection of the three German capital ships. The route was divided into three sectors based upon the Jafü (Fighter Sector) boundaries. Ibel had been appointed Jagdfliegerführer Schiff, shortened to Jafü Schiff (Fighter Controller Ship) and had embarked on Scharnhorst as a signals officer to communicate with Luftwaffe units during the operation.

In December 1942, he became the Jagdfliegerführer West, and in October 1943 assumed command of 2. Jagd-Division, located in northern Germany. During the last two years of the War Ibel was commander of 2. Jagd-Division and at the very end of the War he became Inspector of Jet operations.

== Later life ==
After time as a POW with the Western Allies, Ibel was released in 1948. In April 1948, Ibel testified on behalf of former Generalfeldmarschall Hugo Sperrle in the High Command Trial at the Subsequent Nuremberg Trials. Ibel rejoined the German Air Force in October 1957 as a Brigadier General.

== Awards ==
- Knight's Cross of the Iron Cross on 22 August 1940 as Oberst and Geschwaderkommodore of Jagdgeschwader 27

Military offices
Preceded by none	Commander of Jagdgeschwader 3 Udet; May 1, 1939 – September 26, 1939	Succeeded by Oberleutnant Carl Vieck
Preceded by none	Commander of Jagdgeschwader 27 Afrika; October 1, 1939 – October 10, 1940	Succeeded by Major Bernhard Woldenga
Preceded by Oberst Werner Junck	Commander of Jagdfliegerführer 3 June 6, 1941 – December, 1941	Succeeded by Major Karl Hentschel
Preceded by Generalleutnant Walter Schwabedissen	Commander of 2. Jagd-Division; October 1, 1943 – February 1, 1945	Succeeded by Oberst Gustav Rödel
Preceded by —	Commander of 1. Luftwaffendivision (Bundeswehr); 1 October 1957 – 30 September 1961	Succeeded by Brigadegeneral Herrmann Aldinger
