= Jagdgeschwader =

Jagdgeschwader were the series of fighter wings of initially, the German Empire's Luftstreitkräfte air arm of the Deutsches Heer, then the successor fighter wings of the Third Reich's original Luftwaffe air arm of its combined Wehrmacht armed forces (1935-45), and after 1949, the fighter wings of the air arm of the current Federal German Republic's Bundeswehr armed forces, the Luftwaffe.

- Jagdgeschwader 1
  - Royal Prussian Jagdgeschwader I (World War I)
  - Jagdgeschwader 1 Oesau (Luftwaffe)
- Jagdgeschwader 2 Richtofen
- Royal Prussian Jagdgeschwader II (World War I)
- Jagdgeschwader 3 Udet
- Jagdgeschwader III (World War I)
- Royal Bavarian Jagdgeschwader IV (World War I)
- Jagdgeschwader 5 Eismeer
- Jagdgeschwader 26 Schlageter
- Jagdgeschwader 27 Afrika
- Jagdgeschwader 50
- Jagdgeschwader 51 Mölders
- Jagdgeschwader 52
- Jagdgeschwader 53 Pik As
- Jagdgeschwader 54 Grünherz
- Jagdgeschwader 71
  - Taktisches Luftwaffengeschwader 71 "Richthofen" (Bundeswehr)
  - Jagdgeschwader 71 (World War II)
- Jagdgeschwader 73 or Taktisches Luftwaffengeschwader 73 "Steinhoff" (Bundeswehr)
- Jagdgeschwader 77 Herz As
- Jagdgeschwader 104
- Jagdgeschwader 130
- Jagdgeschwader 132
- Jagdgeschwader 133
- Jagdgeschwader 135
- Jagdgeschwader 138
- Jagdgeschwader 141
- Jagdgeschwader 144
- Jagdgeschwader 231
- Jagdgeschwader 232
- Jagdgeschwader 234
- Jagdgeschwader 300
- Jagdgeschwader 301

== See also ==
- Wing (military aviation unit)
- Ergänzungs-Jagdgeschwader
