= U96 (disambiguation) =

U96 is a German musical project.

U96 may also refer to:

- German submarine U-96, various vessels
- HMS Peacock (U96), a sloop of the Royal Navy
