= German submarine U-96 =

U-96 may refer to one of the following German submarines:

- SM U-96, a Type U 93 submarine launched in 1917 and that served in the First World War until surrendered on 20 November 1918; broken up at Bo'ness in 1920–21
  - During the First World War, Germany also had these submarines with similar names:
    - SM UB-96, a Type UB III submarine launched in 1918 and surrendered on 21 November 1918; broken up at Bo'ness in 1920–21
    - SM UC-96, a Type UC III submarine launched in 1918 and surrendered on 24 November 1918; broken up at Morecambe in 1919–20
- German submarine U-96 (1940), a Type VIIC submarine that served in the Second World War until sunk on 30 March 1945; the subject of the director Wolfgang Petersen's 1981 film, Das Boot.
