= Otto Ciliax =

German admiral (1891–1964)

- Born: 30 October 1891; Neudietendorf, German Empire
- Died: 12 December 1964 (aged 73); Lübeck-Travemünde, West Germany
- Military career
- Allegiance: German Empire; Weimar Republic; Nazi Germany
- Branch: Imperial German Navy; Reichsmarine; Kriegsmarine
- Service years: 1910–1945
- Rank: Admiral
- Units: SMS Victoria Louise; SMS Württemberg; SMS Vulkan; SMS Hannover; SM U-52
- Commands: SM UB-96; SM UC-27; T 92; T 107; T 181; T 140; T 145; G8; S18; 1st Torpedo-Boat Half-Flotilla; Admiral Scheer; Scharnhorst; Commander, Battleships; Naval High Command, Norway
- Conflicts: World War I Spanish Civil War World War II: Operation Cerberus
- Awards: Knight's Cross of the Iron Cross

Otto Ciliax (30 October 1891 – 12 December 1964) was a German naval officer who served in the navies of the German Empire, the Weimar Republic and Nazi Germany. As an admiral during World War II, he commanded the German battleships. He was a recipient of the Knight's Cross of the Iron Cross.

== Early life and career ==
Ciliax was born on 30 October 1891 in Neudietendorf, at the time part of Saxe-Coburg and Gotha. He joined the military service of the Imperial German Navy on 1 April 1910 as a Seekadett of "Crew 1910" (the incoming class of 1910). He started his first naval infantry training course with the sea cadet detachment on SMS Victoria Louise on 7 April 1910. (Note: sea cadet detachment —Seekadettendetachement) Onboard training on Victory Louise began on 13 May before he was transferred to the Naval Academy Mürwik on 1 April 1911 for the main cadet and officer course. (Note: cadet course—Lehrgang für Fähnriche) (Note: officer course—Lehrgang für Offiziere) Afterwards, starting on 1 October 1912 he served on the battleship SMS Hannover and was promoted to Leutnant zur See (acting sub-lieutenant/ensign) on 27 September 1913.

=== World War I ===
Ciliax was still serving on Hannover when World War I broke out on 28 July 1914. He was a watch officer on SM U-52 when it sank the cruiser HMS Nottingham on 19 August 1916. After completing submarine commander's training, he was given SM UB-96 in June 1918 and SM UC-27 in September that year.

=== Between the wars ===
He remained with the Reichsmarine after the German collapse of 1918, serving as torpedo boat commander and staff officer, heading the operations department (Operationsabteilung) of the Naval High Command (Oberkommando der Marine) in 1936. In 1936 he was given command of the German cruiser Admiral Scheer (22 September 1936 – 30 October 1938) and served as the Commander of the Sea-Force (Befehlshaber der Seestreitkräfte "Spanien") from 22 March 1938 to 26 June 1938 during the Spanish Civil War. He commanded the German battleship Scharnhorst when war broke out in September 1939.

=== World War II ===
In June 1941 he became Type Commander, Battleships (Befehlshaber der Schlachtschiffe). In this position he commanded the February 1942 Operation Cerberus, better known as "the Channel Dash", when German battleships Scharnhorst and Gneisenau, the heavy cruiser Prinz Eugen, and a number of other smaller vessels were transferred from Brest to their respective home bases in Germany for planned deployment to Norwegian waters in February 1942. Ciliax flew his flag on Scharnhorst. Although the success of the operation was seen as an embarrassment to the British because the ships were able to pass through the English Channel almost undetected (though both Scharnhorst and Gneisenau struck a minefield en route), the transfer from Brest to Germany eliminated the threat they had posed to Allied shipping in the Atlantic. In February 1942, during operations in Norway, Vice-Admiral Otto Ciliax commanded a flotilla of warships that included the heavy cruiser Prinz Eugen, which served as his flagship during the voyage. From March 1943 until April 1945 Ciliax was Commander-in-Chief of German naval forces in Norway (Marinekommando Norwegen).

== Awards ==
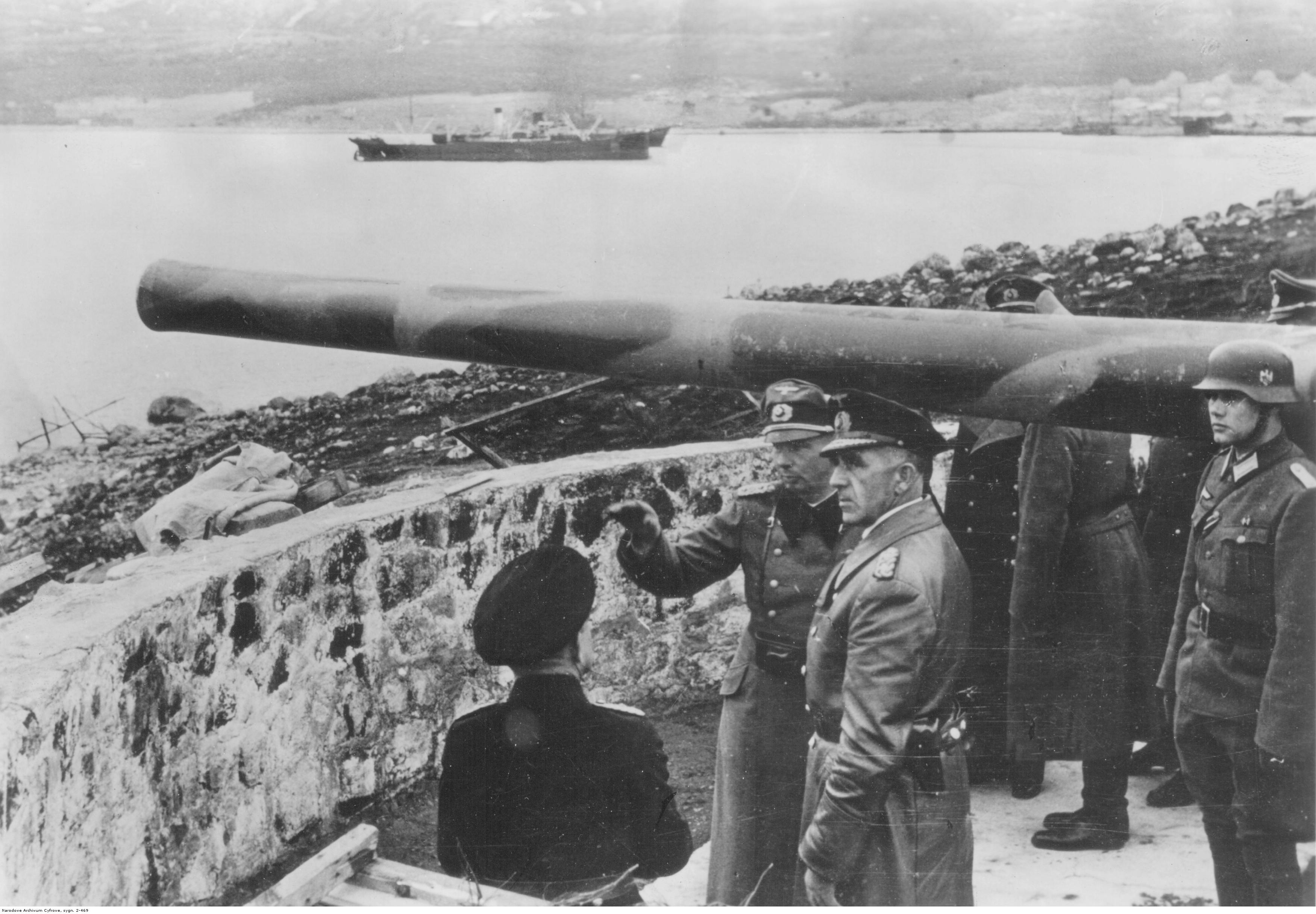
Admiral Otto Ciliax (second from right) during an inspection of German naval troops and a 150 mm gun in northern Norway.

- Iron Cross (1914)
  - 2nd Class (13 June 1916)
  - 1st Class (6 November 1916)
- Knight's Cross Second Class of the Ducal Saxe-Ernestine House Order with Swords
- Military Merit Cross 3rd class with war decoration (Austria-Hungary)
- U-boat War Badge (1918)
- Wehrmacht Long Service Award 4th to 1st Class (2 October 1936)
- Spanish Cross in Gold with Swords (6 June 1939)
- Clasp to the Iron Cross (1939)
  - 2nd Class (January 1940)
  - 1st Class (April 1940)
- Commander's Cross of the Order of the Crown of Italy (11 March 1941)
- Medal for the Campaign of 1936−1939 (Spain)
- German Cross in Gold on 20 November 1941 as Vizeadmiral and commander of the battleships
- Knight's Cross of the Iron Cross on 21 March 1942 as Vizeadmiral and commander of the battleships
- High Seas Fleet Badge (1941)

=== Promotions ===
1 April 1910:	Seekadett (Midshipman)
15 April 1911:	Fähnrich zur See (Officer Cadet) with patent L1
15 April 1912:	Fähnrich zur See (Officer Cadet) with patent A
27 September 1913:	Leutnant zur See (Ensign or Acting Sub-Lieutenant) with patent B
22 March 1916:	Oberleutnant zur See (Lieutenant Junior Grade or Sub-Lieutenant) with patent B
29 June 1920:	Kapitänleutnant (Captain Lieutenant) with patent C
1 October 1928:	Korvettenkapitän (Corvette Captain)
1 October 1933:	Fregattenkapitän (Frigate Captain)
1 July 1935:	Kapitän zur See (Captain at Sea)
1 November 1939:	Konteradmiral (Rear Admiral)
1 June 1941:	Vizeadmiral (Vice Admiral)
1 February 1943:	Admiral (Admiral)

== Translation notes ==
Military offices
New creation	Commander of the German Battleships; 16 June 1941 – 2 June 1942	disbanded
Preceded by Generaladmiral Hermann Boehm	Commander-in-Chief of the Kriegsmarine High Command Norway; March 1943 – April 1945	Succeeded by Admiral Theodor Krancke
