= Jagdgeschwader 232 =

Fighter Wing 232
- Jagdgeschwader 232
- Country: Nazi Germany
- Branch: Luftwaffe

Jagdgeschwader 232 was a fighter wing of Nazi Germany's Luftwaffe during the interwar period. It was formed on 1 April 1936 without a staff from a core of personnel from JG 132 (Gruppe Loerzer).

== Bibliography ==
- Mombeek, Eric; Smith, J. Richard & Creek, Eddie J. (1999). Jagdwaffe: Birth of the Luftwaffe Fighter Force. Luftwaffe Colours. Vol. 1, Section 1. Classic Publications. ISBN 0-9526867-5-9.
- Tessin, Georg (1974). Deutsche Verbände und Truppen 1918-1939: Altes Heer, Freiwilligenverbände, Reichswehr, Heer, Lutfwaffe, Landespolizei. Biblio-Verlag. ISBN 3-7648-1000-9.
