= Aufklärungsgruppe 123 =

Reconnaissance Group 123
- Aufklärungsgruppe 123
- Disbanded: 1945
- Country: Nazi Germany
- Branch: Luftwaffe
- Role: Reconnaissance

Aufklärungsgruppe 123 (Reconnaissance Group 123) was a Luftwaffe air reconnaissance group that participated in World War II.
