= Robert Cowper (RAAF officer) =

Australian flying ace

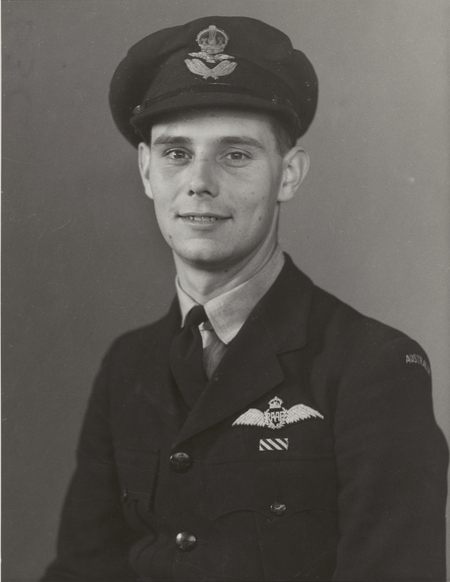
- Born: 24 June 1922; Broken Hill, New South Wales, Australia
- Died: 19 June 2016 (aged 93); Adelaide, South Australia, Australia
- Military career
- Allegiance: Australia
- Branch: Royal Australian Air Force
- Service years: 1940–1945
- Rank: Squadron Leader
- Units: No. 153 Squadron; No. 89 Squadron; No. 108 Squadron
- Commands: No. 456 Squadron
- Conflicts: Second World War; Channel Front; Invasion of Sicily; Invasion of Normandy; Operation Diver
- Awards: Distinguished Flying Cross & Bar; Medal of the Order of Australia; Knight of the Legion of Honour (France)

Robert Barson Cowper, DFC & Bar, OAM (24 June 1922 – 19 June 2016) was a flying ace of the Royal Australian Air Force (RAAF) during the Second World War. He was credited with at least six aerial victories.

From New South Wales, Cowper joined the RAAF in 1940. After completing his flight training the following year, he was sent to the United Kingdom to serve with the Royal Air Force. Cowper was posted to No. 153 Squadron, a night fighting unit, before going to the Middle East to serve with No. 89 Squadron and then No. 108 Squadron on Malta in 1943. He achieved his first aerial victories in the lead up to and during the Allied invasion of Sicily. Awarded the Distinguished Flying Cross (DFC), he returned to the United Kingdom later in the year as an instructor. In May 1944 he returned to operational flying with a posting to No. 456 Squadron and during the invasion of Normandy, shot down several German aircraft. Awarded a bar to his DFC early in 1945, he finished the war as acting commander of the squadron.

Returning to civilian life, he worked for an engineering company and later took up farming. In 2004 he was also appointed a Chevalier (Knight) of the French Legion of Honour to celebrate the 60th anniversary of the invasion of Normandy. Prominent in veteran's affairs during his retirement, he was later a recipient of the Medal of the Order of Australia. He died in Adelaide, aged 93.

== Early life ==
Robert Barson Cowper was born in Broken Hill in New South Wales, Australia, on 24 June 1922. His father, William Cowper, was from London and had emigrated to Australia when he was 21. The Cowper family, which in addition to Cowper's parents also included three sisters, later moved to Kangaroo Flat in South Australia. Cowper was educated at Queen's College in North Adelaide and once he finished his schooling, he found employment as a draughtsman. In June 1940, he joined the Royal Australian Air Force (RAAF).

== Second World War ==
Cowper's flight training was carried out at No. 5 Initial Training School in Western Australia and then No. 8 Elementary Flying Training School. In April 1941 he went to Canada under the Empire Air Training Scheme for further training at No. 11 Service Flying Training School, Royal Canadian Air Force, flying North American Harvard trainers. Commissioned as a pilot officer in July, he proceeded to the United Kingdom the following month to serve with the Royal Air Force (RAF).

After a period of time at No. 10 Operational Training Unit (OTU) in Scotland at RAF East Fortune, in November he was posted to the new No. 153 Squadron, equipped with Boulton Paul Defiants at Ballyhalbert in County Down, Northern Ireland. Training as a night fighting squadron, it became operational in December but in early 1942 began to re-equip with the twin-engined Bristol Beaufighter heavy fighter. It saw little action while performing its patrolling duties and by September was carrying out convoy patrols. By this time, Cowper had been promoted to flying officer.

=== Middle East and Sicily ===
At the end of the year, Cowper and his navigator/radar operator, Flying Officer Bill Watson, were transferred to No. 89 Squadron, based at Abu Sueir in Egypt, also operating Beaufighter night fighters. The squadron had a detachment stationed on Malta and in January 1943 Cowper and Watson were sent there. While flying their Beaufighter to Malta, they ran out of fuel over Tunisia and had to bale out. Walking for four days, Cowper and Watson reached the Allied lines and from there were transported to Malta.

In March, Cowper's detachment was integrated into No. 108 Squadron for the aerial defence of the Nile Delta. Cowper and Watson regularly flew patrols to the north of Tunisia before the squadron switched to intruder patrols to the Italian island of Sicily. On the night of 18 April, Cowper made his first claim, for a Messerschmitt Me 210 heavy fighter that was damaged over the town of Marsala. Following the Allied invasion of Sicily in July, the squadron flew cover for the landing beaches. Cowper destroyed a Junkers Ju 88 medium bomber on the night of 11 July but his Beaufighter was damaged by debris from the exploding Ju 88. He and his navigator baled out; the latter, flying in Watson's stead, was lost at sea while Cowper, suffering severe cuts and a broken nose, apparently was in free-fall for some time in a state of unconsciousness before awaking and opening his parachute. He was spotted and picked up by a hospital ship, HMHS Aba, after spending several hours in the water.

Cowper was back at No. 108 Squadron within a few days and on 21 July shot down another Ju 88. His tour of operations ended the following month and he returned to the United Kingdom. He was awarded the Distinguished Flying Cross (DFC) at the end of August; the citation, published in The London Gazette, read:

This officer has completed 68 sorties and has displayed great courage and determination. During a sortie in January, 1943, Flying Officer Cowper was compelled to make a forced landing behind the enemy's lines but he displayed great resource in outwitting the enemy and regained our own lines on foot. One night in July, 1943, he engaged a Junkers 88 and caused it to explode. The enemy aircraft disintegrated and a large portion struck and so disabled Flying Officer Cowper's aircraft that he was forced to leave it by parachute. He was later rescued from the sea and rejoined his squadron to resume operational flying. Since then, Flying Officer Cowper has destroyed another Junkers 88.

— London Gazette, No. 36152, 31 August 1943

=== Later war service ===
Promoted to flight lieutenant, Cowper was posted as an instructor to No. 63 OTU at Honiley. In March 1944, he was transferred to No. 5 Tactical Exercise Unit at Annan, Scotland. He returned to operational flying with No. 456 Squadron, a RAAF unit, in May. It was based at Ford, carrying out night patrols over the south of England using de Havilland Mosquito Mk XVII heavy fighters. Once Operation Overlord, the Allied invasion of Normandy, commenced on 6 June, it flew at night over the landing beaches.

Reunited with Watson as his navigator and radar operator, Cowper destroyed a Heinkel He 177 heavy bomber west of Cherbourg on the night of 9 June. He carried on with his patrol and shot down a Dornier Do 217 medium bomber as well. In both instances, he reported seeing glider bombs being carried by the aircraft that he attacked. Then on 14 June, with Watson providing directions from his radar equipment, he shot down a Ju 88, the bomber going down into the sea. His last aerial victory was a He 177, shot down to the south of Selsey Bill on 5 July. This was one of three aircraft of this type destroyed by pilots of No. 456 Squadron that night.

Later in July, No. 456 Squadron became involved in Operation Diver, the RAF's campaign against German V-1 flying bombs targeting the south of England. Cowper made a claim for one V-1 destroyed but this was subsequently awarded to an anti-aircraft unit. The later months of the year were relatively quiet as the squadron reverted to night patrols over England. At the end of the year it moved north to RAF Church Fenton and in the following months saw more action dealing with incoming Luftwaffe night fighter attacks on bomber bases in England. Cowper, promoted to squadron leader at the start of 1945, was awarded a bar to his DFC in February.

No. 456 Squadron began operating from RAF Bradwell Bay in March as bomber-support, a duty it performed until the end of the war in Europe. Cowper was the squadron's final commander, leading it from May until 15 June 1945 when it was disbanded. He ended the war credited with having destroyed six German aircraft and damaging one.

== Later life ==
Cowper returned to Australia with his wife, Katherine née McCall, who he had met during his time at Ballyhalbert and married in 1943 and their daughter. In civilian life, he worked for an engineering firm before taking up farming. In his retirement, he was an advocate for recognition of No. 456 Squadron's war service, as the RAAF's only night fighter squadron. His efforts saw its logo officially recognised as the squadron's badge.

One of ten Australian war veterans appointed a Chevalier (Knight) of the French Legion of Honour on 7 June 2004 in a ceremony in Canberra recognising the 60th anniversary of the invasion of Normandy, Cowper was later awarded the Medal of the Order of Australia for his work in veteran's affairs. He died at Adelaide on 19 June 2016; his wife had predeceased him by three years and he was survived by two of his four daughters. One daughter married Peter Jolly, a noted Australian horse trainer.
