= Keith Hampshire (RAAF officer) =

Australian airman (1914–1982)

Keith MacDermott Hampshire
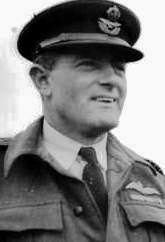
- Keith Hampshire in England, 9 June 1944
- Born: 14 September 1914; Port Macquarie, Australia
- Died: circa 17 November 1982 (aged 68); Palos Verdes, California, United States
- Relatives: John Hampshire (brother)
- Military career
- Allegiance: Australia
- Branch: Royal Air Force
- Service years: 1937–1946
- Rank: Group Captain
- Commands: No. 456 Squadron RAAF (1944); No. 22 Squadron RAAF (1942–43); No. 6 Squadron RAAF (1941–42)
- Conflicts: Second World War; South West Pacific theatre; Battle of the Bismarck Sea; European theatre; Operation Steinbock; Normandy landings
- Awards: Distinguished Service Order & Bar; Distinguished Flying Cross

Keith MacDermott Hampshire, DSO & Bar, DFC (10 September 1914 – c. 17 November 1982) was a pilot and ace of the Royal Australian Air Force (RAAF) during the Second World War. He saw action in twin-engine propeller-driven aircraft, flying intruder, ground attack and night fighter missions.

Hampshire is notable for three achievements in particular:

- becoming the first person to be awarded the Distinguished Service Order (DSO) twice while posted to RAAF units;
- commanding front-line squadrons in both the Pacific and European theatres, and;
- destroying at least seven (and perhaps as many as 10) enemy aircraft in air combat, all of them during 1944.

His younger brother, John Hampshire (1916–1990), also commanded RAAF squadrons in both the Pacific and Europe.

== Early life ==
The Hampshire family had an agricultural background and Keith was born at Portsea, Port Macquarie, New South Wales, to Gladys May Hampshire and Percy George Hampshire. The family moved to Perth, Western Australia (WA), where Percy Hampshire took up a position as State Dairy Expert and later became a cattle breeder. Keith attended Scotch College, where he obtained a Junior Certificate. Hampshire then attended Muresk Agricultural College, worked as a wool classer and gained a pilots' licence in his spare time.

A keen surfer and track and field athlete, Hampshire was a member of the WA team at the 1935 national surf life saving carnival in Sydney, and during the same period was also chief instructor at Cottesloe Surf Life Saving Club.

He joined the RAAF on 18 January 1937 and had the service number of "147" throughout his career. In 1939, Hampshire completed a specialist signals course in England at RAF Cranwell, as the war was breaking out. He was initially posted to signals duties in Australia.

Hampshire was promoted to temporary squadron leader in 1941 and returned to flying, commanding maritime patrol squadrons: No. 6 Squadron RAAF at RAAF Richmond, and then No. 23 Squadron RAAF in Queensland. He was promoted to temporary wing commander in October 1942.

Citation
Distinguished Service Order
(27 April 1943)

Wing Commander Hampshire has commanded No. 22 (Intruder) Squadron since 7 December 1942, during the greater part of this Squadron's outstanding operations against the enemy in Papua. He has performed several deeds of heroism which have marked him as a Pilot and a leader of outstanding merit.

On 14 December 1942, Hampshire led a formation of Boston aircraft whose mission was to locate and attack an attempted enemy landing in the vicinity of Buna. Foul weather caused the formation to separate but at 0520 hours Wing Commander Hampshire, flying alone, located five Japanese Destroyers disembarking troops and equipment approximately 20 miles North-East of Cape Ward-Hunt. In the face of intense anti-aircraft fire he immediately attacked a Destroyer and dropped two 500 lb. bombs achieving near misses. As stores and troops were primary targets, Wing Commander Hampshire directed his attention to these until both bombs and ammunition were exhausted. The accuracy of both bombing and strafing wrought havoc amidst the landing operations and as a result of his location of the enemy vessels, a heavy Squadron was able to attack shortly afterwards.

On 4 February 1943, he again led a formation to attack grounded aircraft on Lae strip. Again extremely bad weather was encountered and it was only by the sheer grit and determination of Wing Commander Hampshire that the formation was led to the target. Eight passes over the target area had to be made before the target was actually identified and the formation was subjected to intense anti-aircraft opposition throughout. Wing Commander Hampshire drove home the attack and led his formation successfully back to base.

On 5 March 1943, Wing Commander Hampshire led a formation which was detailed to bomb and strafe Lae strip at first light. Whilst leading the formation into line for the run over the target, intense anti-aircraft fire was encountered which struck his aircraft and wounded him in the leg. Despite the wound and consequent loss of blood, he drove home the attack with great determination and led his formation back to base. He was later removed to hospital where an operation was performed to remove shrapnel from his leg.

On 16 March 1943, although not recovered from his wound and with his leg heavily bandaged, he insisted on leading a further formation over Salamaua. As heavy anti-aircraft opposition was anticipated and as the run over the target took the formation directly over four strong anti-aircraft posts, Wing Commander Hampshire assigned to himself the task of attacking those posts by bombing and strafing in order to reduce the opposition against the remainder of the formation and so ensure more accurate bombing. As a result this strike was the most successful carried out by the Squadron and tremendous damage was done to enemy installations.

His Squadron has won a most enviable active service reputation and this reputation is basically due to the brilliant leadership, exceptional courage and never flagging determination of its Commanding Officer. Wing Commander Hampshire has completed 786 operational hours under flying conditions which must rank among the most difficult that exist.

Citation
Distinguished Flying Cross
(12 May 1944)

Wing Commander Hampshire has commanded the Squadron since December 1943 and has displayed inspiring leadership, great skill and gallantry.

Since operating in this country this Officer has shot down three enemy aircraft at night, two of them in one sortie. In the latter of his two fights his aircraft was damaged by flying portions of disintegrating enemy aircraft. Nevertheless, he flew safely to base although his aircraft was almost uncontrollable.

This Officer's achievements are worthy of the greatest praise and typical of the determination he has shown throughout his operational tour.

Citation
Distinguished Service Order
(9 February 1945)

Since being awarded the Distinguished Flying Cross, Group Captain Hampshire has led [456] Squadron on very many sorties during which 32 enemy aircraft have been destroyed. Much of this success can be attributed to this Officer's outstanding leadership and great skill. His iron determination and unfailing devotion to duty have set an example of the highest order.

Group Captain Hampshire has inflicted much loss on the enemy including the destruction of seven aircraft.

== War service ==
=== Pacific theatre ===
In December 1942, Hampshire received a front-line command: No. 22 Squadron RAAF, flying Douglas Boston Mk III light bombers in New Guinea. Aviation historian Hank Nelson described Hampshire's approach to operations as "aggressive", accompanied by a concern for his squadron's facilities and morale. Hampshire worked closely in 22 Sqn with Flight Lieutenant Bill Newton and it was Hampshire who recommended Newton for the posthumous award of a Victoria Cross. (In March 1943, Newton was shot down and taken prisoner during a mission over Japanese positions near Salamaua and subject to summary execution by a Japanese officer.)

22 Sqn played a key role in the Battle of the Bismarck Sea. On the morning of 5 March 1943, to hinder Japanese air support, Hampshire led six Bostons in an attack on the major airbase at Lae. As he began the squadron's attack run, Hampshire was seriously wounded in the leg by shrapnel and suffered severe blood loss, but carried out the attack and piloted his Boston back to base. Before the wound had fully healed, Hampshire resumed combat operations. As a result of his conduct since joining 22 Sqn, he was awarded the DSO, on 27 April 1943 (see the Citation opposite).

In mid-1943, the RAAF transferred Hampshire to the UK. He travelled via the United States and in New York City the US Army Pictorial Service filmed Hampshire at the Empire State Building, in conversation with former members of the US 3rd Bombardment Group – discussing their respective roles during the Battle of the Bismarck Sea. The footage appeared in the documentary feature Appointment in Tokyo (1945).

=== Europe ===
In the UK, Hampshire undertook a fighter conversion course, and in late 1943, he assumed command of No. 456 Squadron, an Article XV RAAF night fighter unit, at RAF Fairwood Common, in Wales. The squadron was converting at the time to the De Havilland Mosquito NF Mk. XVII, which carried AI Mk X on-board radar. In the words of Nelson, Hampshire proved to be a "demanding leader who enforced the division between the officers and non-commissioned aircrew... drove the squadron hard, and [ensured] it was well prepared for front-line duties.

In March 1944, in response to Unternehmnen Steinbock ("Operation Ibex"), a German Luftwaffe intruder offensive against targets in southern England, 456 Sqn relocated to RAF Ford, in Sussex.

According to aviation historian Martin W. Bowman, Hampshire and his navigator, Flt Lt Tom Condon most often flew Mosquito HK286 (squadron code "RX-A").

The pair experienced great success in this aircraft, starting with two Ju 88s shot down on [the night of] 27/28 February 1944 off the south-west coast [of England]. On 24/25 March they destroyed ... Ju88 [3E+AP] of 6./KG 6 over Walberton, in Sussex, and three nights later ... downed [two] Ju 88s[:] 3E+FT of 9/KG 6 [over Beer, Devon,] and B3+BL of 3./KG 54 [over Isle Brewers, Somerset]... On 23/24 April they shot down another Ju 88 into the sea near Swanage, whilst on 28/29 April they probably damaged a Do 217[,] 86 miles off Durrington [West Sussex]. On 22/23 May they downed a Ju 88S off the Isle of Wight, and on 12/13 June claimed ... another Ju 88 over the [English] Channel.

As D-Day approached, 456 Sqn switched to intruder and ground attack sorties over occupied Europe. The squadron primarily attacked trains and other ground targets in France, while also diverting the Luftwaffe from major Allied bomber operations.

Near Le Havre on D-Day + 1 (7 June 1944), 456 Sqn intercepted a formation of four-engined Heinkel He 177 heavy bombers, belonging to KG 40, each armed with two glide bombs, approaching the Allied beachheads. Hampshire shot down one of the heavy bombers and 456 Sqn destroyed four in all. 456 Sqn also destroyed more than 20 V-1 flying bombs. While 456 Sqn had shot down only six enemy aircraft before Keith Hampshire assumed command, it was credited with 38 kills by the time he departed.

By 1944, Hampshire's brother John was also commanding a RAAF unit in the UK, No. 461 Squadron RAAF. The parallel military careers of the brothers attracted publicity, as did their recreational interests, including participation in a surf carnival reputed to be the first held in England. At around this time, Australian official war artist William Dargie made Hampshire the subject of a portrait (later acquired by the Royal Air Force Museum).

Hampshire ceased combat duties in November 1944, after which he was posted to No. 300 Group, RAF Transport Command. This was part of the Allied preparations for the final stages of the war against Japan.

On 18 February 1945, Hampshire was awarded a Bar to his DSO, as a result of his service with 456 Sqn (see the citation opposite).

He was discharged from the RAAF in Australia on 29 April 1946, by which time he had achieved the substantive rank of group captain.

== Later life ==
Nelson said of Hampshire's post-war life, that his "confidence, even arrogance, in decision-making, his courage, skill, competitiveness and acceptance of the loneliness of command that had served him well in the air war did not transfer easily into business." He never married.

Hampshire worked for the British Aviation Insurance Group in Australia and Asia, as well as fields such as farming, oil exploration, aircraft sales and importing.

During the 1960s, he attended Trinity College, Cambridge, from which he received a Bachelor of Arts (1963) and a Master of Arts in economics (1970).

While visiting the United States, on or about 17 November 1982, Hampshire died from injuries following a fall from a beach cliff at Palos Verdes, California. A coroner recorded a verdict of accidental death.
