= No. 456 Squadron RAAF =

Royal Australian Air Force squadron

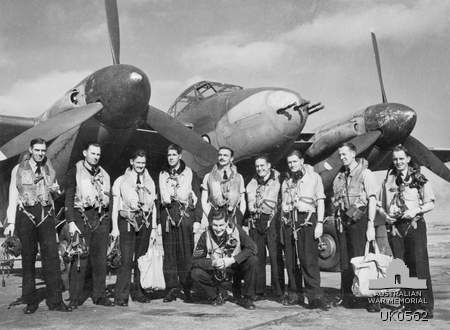
- Members of No. 456 Squadron RAAF in front of a de Havilland Mosquito night fighter in 1943
- Active: 30 June 1941 – 15 June 1945
- Country: Australia
- Allegiance: United Kingdom
- Branch: Royal Australian Air Force
- Role: Night fighter
- Part of: RAF Fighter Command: No. 9 Group; No. 10 Group; No. 11 Group
- Battle honours: Fortress Europe, 1940–1944; France and Germany, 1944–1945; Normandy, 1944; Biscay, 1940–1945

Insignia
- Squadron codes: PZ (Jun 1941 – Sep 1941); SA (Sep 1941 – Dec 1941); RX (Dec 1941 – Jun 1945)

Aircraft flown
- Fighter: Boulton Paul Defiant; Bristol Beaufighter de Havilland Mosquito

No. 456 Squadron RAAF was a Royal Australian Air Force (RAAF) night fighter squadron, operational over Europe during World War II. Formed in mid-1941, the squadron was the RAAF's only night fighter squadron. It was also the first RAAF unit to use a roundel featuring a red kangaroo in a blue circle, on some parts of its aircraft. While this insignia was unofficial and the squadron's main markings conformed to the RAF roundels used by British and other Commonwealth units, it inspired the post-war roundel used by the RAAF.

== History ==
No. 456 Squadron RAAF was formed on 30 June 1941 at RAF Valley, Isle of Anglesey, Wales, in the United Kingdom under Article XV of the Empire Air Training Scheme as a night-fighter squadron, equipped with Boulton Paul Defiant turret-fighters. The squadron was soon re-equipped with Bristol Beaufighters and scored its first kill in January 1942. Throughout the year, the squadron's aircraft operated in a mainly defensive role over the United Kingdom, but in December 1942, the squadron was re-equipped with de Havilland Mosquito fighters and began offensive "Ranger" missions over Europe attacking a variety of targets ground targets including German rolling stock, and also attacking German bombers close to their airfields during "Intruder" missions.

In March 1943, after a move to RAF Middle Wallop, No. 456 Squadron was utilised in the night fighter and long-range day fighter roles. It also provided a detachment of aircraft to conduct fighter sweeps in support of aircraft mounting anti-submarine patrols in the Bay of Biscay, and escorted air–sea rescue vessels picking up downed airmen. Further moves occurred as the squadron relocated first to Colerne and then Fairwood Common. It continued in the fighter and ground attack roles until the end of the European war. In January 1944, it was deployed in defence of London following an increase in German bombing (Operation Steinbock) during which its crews accounted for 12 German aircraft, continuing in the air defence role until late February or early March when the squadron moved to Ford.

The squadron's first success came on the night of 1/2 March 1944 when 164 German bombers operated over England. Pilot Officer R. W. Richardson claimed a probable victory against a Dornier Do 217 at 03:05 near RAF Ford. On 21/22 March Flying Officer K. A. Roediger claimed a Junkers Ju 88 off Rye at 01:12. Detailed loss records indicate eight Ju 88s failed to return—four can be attached to the claims of other squadrons and four cannot.

That same night, the squadron's CO and most successful night fighter ace, Wing Commander Keith Hampshire, began a run of success. At 23:50, near Walberton in Sussex he engaged a Ju 88A-4 of 6 Staffel Kampfgeschwader 6. The aircraft, code 3E+AP, crashed near Arundel railway station. The pilot, Hauptmann Anton Oeben, parachuted clear and was made prisoner of war. Observer Feldwebel Otton Bahn was captured badly injured after his parachute failed to open but died of wounds. The same fate befell Unteroffizier Gerhard Drews and Herbert Ehrhardt was listed as missing in action. Hampshire followed this up on the 27/28 March. Over Beer, Devon, he engaged another Ju 88A-4, code 3E+FT, Werknummer 44551, shooting it down at 23:35. Unteroffizier Günther Blaffert was captured, Obergefreiter Gerhart Harteng was killed, Obergefreiter Josef Helm and Gefreiter Adam Kurz was posted missing. Once again the men were from KG 6, this time from 9 staffel. Within minutes the commander gained a second contact and Ju 88A-4, B3+BL, Werknummer 0144551 from 3./Kampfgeschwader 54, crashed near Taunton, Somerset at 23:51. Oberfeldwebel Hans Brautigam, Obergefreiter Kurt Chalon, Alfred Maletzki were captured and Unteroffizier Robert Belz was killed.

On the night of 18/19 April 1944 Flight Lieutenant C. L Brooks engaged a Messerschmitt Me 410A-1 near Nuthurst, Sussex at 22:28. At an altitude of 24,000 ft Brooks hit the German aircraft destroying the starboard engine and setting the wing alight. The machine, from 1./Kampfgeschwader 51, code 9K+JH, Werknummer 20005, nose-dived vertically into the ground. Leutnant Reinhold Witt and Unteroffizier Ernst Tesch were killed. On 25/26 April three pilots were credited with victories: Flying Officer Roediger claimed a Junkers Ju 188 at 05:16 off Portsmouth. Flying Officer G. R. Houston claimed a Ju 88 off Portsmouth at 23,500 ft at 04:57. According to the report the enemy disintegrated at 20,000 ft. Flight Lieutenant R. V. Lewis claimed a Ju 188 at 23:57, 25 miles off Portsmouth. The Mosquito's armoured screen was smashed when the bomber exploded directly in front of it. Flying Officer A. S. McEvoy claimed a further success on 14/15 May 1944, shooting down a Ju 188A-2 over Greenlands Artillery Range, Larkhill, Wiltshire at 02:00. The machine, code U5+HH, Werknummer 160089, from 1./Kampfgeschwader 2 was destroyed and pilot Feldwebel Heinz Mühlberger was captured, Obergefreiter Willi Eberle, Unteroffizier Artur Krüger, Feldwebel Werner Heinzelmann and Obergefreiter Ewald Steinbeck were killed. A further claim was made by Flying Officer D. W. Arnold at 00:20 over Medstead. 13 German bombers were shot down, nine of them Ju 88 and Ju 188s. Five of the nine bombers cannot be attributed to a particular claim.

During the Invasion of Normandy, the squadron provided air cover for Allied shipping, shooting down 14 German aircraft in the process. Later, it helped defend Britain against V-1 flying bombs, shooting down 24 between June and August 1944. In September 1944, No. 456 Squadron's aircraft supported British troops around Arnhem, before concentrating their patrolling efforts over the Netherlands and Belgium. A move to Church Fenton occurred at the end of the year, and the squadron began operating over Germany, escorting heavy bombers and attacking German airfields. The unit's final wartime commander, Wing Commander Bas Howard, was killed in an accident on 29 May. The squadron was disbanded on 15 June 1945 at RAF Bradwell Bay, Essex. During the war, the squadron lost 29 personnel killed, including 23 Australians; its crews were credited with shooting down 71 aircraft including 29 V-1 flying bombs. No. 456 Squadron aircrew received the following decorations: one Distinguished Service Order, 10 Distinguished Flying Crosses, and one British Empire Medal.

== Aircraft operated ==
No. 456 Squadron operated the following aircraft:

From	To	Aircraft	Version
June 1941	November 1941	Boulton Paul Defiant	Mk.I
September 1941	July 1942	Bristol Beaufighter	Mk.IIf
April 1942	June 1943	Bristol Blenheim	Mk.IV
July 1942	January 1943	Bristol Beaufighter	Mk.VIf
December 1942	April 1944	de Havilland Mosquito	Mk.II
June 1943	October 1943	de Havilland Mosquito	Mk.VI
January 1944	February 1945	de Havilland Mosquito	Mk.XVII
December 1944	June 1945	de Havilland Mosquito	Mk.XXX

== Squadron bases ==
No. 456 Squadron operated from the following bases and airfields:

From	To	Base	Remarks
30 June 1941	30 March 1943	RAF Valley, Isle of Anglesey, Wales	Det. at RAF Colerne, 15–30 Mar 43
30 March 1943	17 August 1943	RAF Middle Wallop, Hampshire	Dets. at RAF Castle Camps, Cambridgeshire and RAF Predannack, Cornwall
17 August 1943	17 November 1943	RAF Colerne, Wiltshire	
17 November 1943	29 February 1944	RAF Fairwood Common, Glamorgan, Wales	
29 February 1944	30 December 1944	RAF Ford, West Sussex	
30 December 1944	16 March 1945	RAF Church Fenton, Yorkshire	
16 March 1945	15 June 1945	RAF Bradwell Bay, Essex	

== Commanding officers ==
No. 456 Squadron was commanded by the following officers:

From	To	Name
30 June 1941	27 March 1942	Wing Commander C. G. C. Olive, DFC
27 March 1942	1 February 1943	Wing Commander E. C. Wolfe
1 February 1943	1 June 1943	Wing Commander M. H. Dwyer
1 June 1943	14 December 1943	Wing Commander G. Howden
14 December 1943	1 July 1944	Wing Commander K. M. Hampshire, DSO & Bar, DFC
1 July 1944	29 May 1945	Wing Commander B. Howard, DFC
29 May 1945	15 June 1945	Squadron Leader R. B. Cowper, DFC
