= Operation Steinbock =

WWII German strategic bombing campaign

- Part of World War II
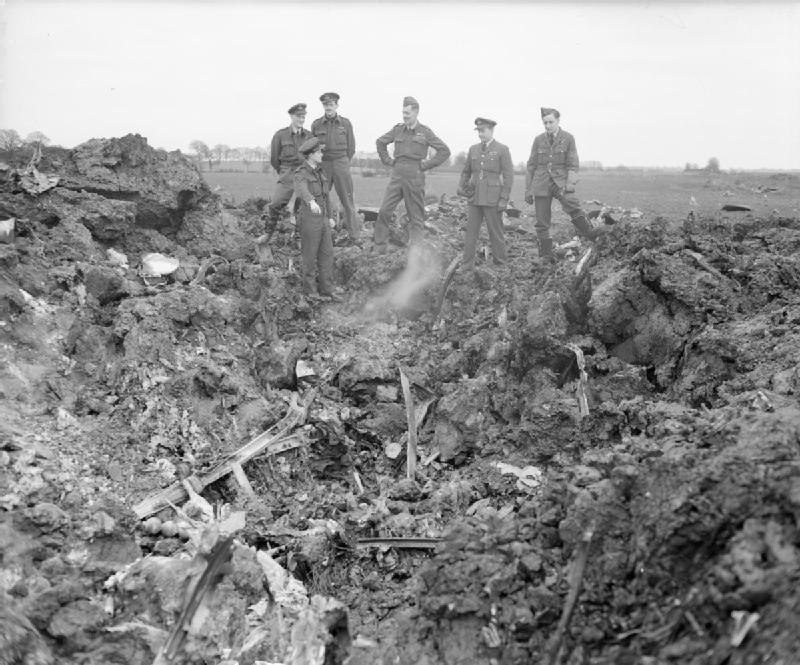
- Air Marshal Sir Roderic Hill inspects the wreckage of a Junkers Ju 188 E-1 belonging to 2. Staffel Kampfgeschwader 6 (Bomber Wing 6) which crashed in Shopland, Essex, 21 March 1944.
Date	21 January – 29 May 1944
Location	Southern United Kingdom
Result	British victory

Belligerents
United Kingdom	(Nazi Germany) Germany

Commanders and leaders
Roderic Hill; Frederick Alfred Pile	Dietrich Peltz; Hugo Sperrle

Strength
c. 25 squadrons	524 bombers

Casualties and losses
Aircraft: 1 destroyed in combat; 5 damaged in combat; 1 lost to friendly fire; 22 lost to other causes; 1,556 civilians killed	Aircraft: 329 destroyed

Operation Steinbock or Operation Capricorn (German: Unternehmen Steinbock), sometimes called the Baby Blitz or Little Blitz, was a strategic bombing campaign by the German Air Force (Luftwaffe) during the Second World War. It comprised attacks on southern England and lasted from January to May 1944. Steinbock was the last strategic air offensive by the German bomber arm during the conflict.

In late 1943, the Allied Combined Bomber Offensive was gathering momentum against Germany. The Allied air forces were conducting a strategic bombing campaign day and night against German industrial cities. Adolf Hitler ordered the Luftwaffe to prepare a bombing operation against the United Kingdom. The bombing offensive also served as propaganda value for the German public and domestic consumption. The operation ran parallel to the Battle of Berlin conducted by RAF Bomber Command (November 1943 – March 1944).

The Luftwaffe assembled 474 bomber aircraft for the offensive. The attacks were mainly aimed at and around the Greater London area. In Britain, it was known as the Baby Blitz due to the much smaller scale of operations compared to the Blitz in 1940–1941. The operation began in January and ended in May 1944. It achieved very little, and the German force suffered a loss of some 329 machines during the five months of operations before it was abandoned. Casualties were at 70 per cent for the aircraft committed and were destroyed at an average rate of 77 per month.

The revenge attacks gave way to attempts to disrupt preparations for the impending Allied invasion of France but Steinbock had worn down the offensive power of the Luftwaffe to the extent it could not mount any significant operations when the D-Day invasion began on 6 June 1944. The offensive was the last big bombing campaign against England using conventional aircraft, thenceforth only the V-1 flying bomb and V-2 rockets – the pioneering examples of cruise missiles and short-range ballistic missiles respectively – were used against British cities.

== Background ==
=== Allied bombing ===
By the end of 1943 the Allied Combined Bomber Offensive had taken a severe toll on Germany. Under the leadership of Generalleutnant Josef Kammhuber, the Luftwaffe night fighter force expanded against the threat. The introduction of airborne radar in the Luftwaffe enabled the German air defences to inflict many losses on RAF Bomber Command, but they could not prevent widespread destruction of industrial cities. Two years after the first radar-intercepted victory by the Luftwaffe, only 83 per cent of the night fighters (49 per cent of establishment) were equipped with Lichtenstein radar. Production of sets was well behind and the later SN-2 sets were unusable by late 1943. By the following spring, technical and production improvements made it effective and available in quantity. The 1,000th set was built in May 1944. Only once did the RAF lose as many as 9 per cent of the attacking force over Germany—during an attack on Pilsen, Czechoslovakia on 17 May 1943. This was below the 10 per cent required to force the British to abandon operations, though Bomber Command losses increased to a peak of 7.14 per cent in December 1943. Average Bomber Command losses rose from 3.98 per cent in January to July 1943 to 5.76 per cent August to December and reached 7.14 per cent that month.

=== Genesis of Steinbock ===
Kammhuber's efforts were damaged by the amateurish leadership style of Hermann Göring, commander-in-chief of the Luftwaffe. Göring's poor understanding of the technicalities of air warfare was mirrored by the Chief of the General Staff, Hans Jeschonnek. Göring had neglected his command since the outbreak of war but sought to meet his responsibilities in 1943 as his prestige with Adolf Hitler waned in the aftermath of Stalingrad on the Eastern Front. Göring's interference in air defence was disastrous. On the night of 22/23 October 1943, he took command of the night fighters. The British Operation Corona helped confuse the defences and Göring's mishandling of the night fighter force allowed Bomber Command to devastate Kassel. Göring deflected the blame for British attacks on his subordinates and his relations with them deteriorated. In August 1943 Jeschonnek killed himself after the Peenemünde Raid. In November 1943 Bomber Command began the Battle of Berlin and Kammhuber was sacked.

At the top of the German High Command (Oberkommando der Wehrmacht, OKW) there was little understanding or appreciation for air defence, even in the aftermath of the bombing of Hamburg which inflicted 76,600 casualties and destroyed large parts of the city and its industry. While Hitler had left the Luftwaffe to Göring earlier in the war, he was now enmeshed in decision-making. Göring was reduced to a conduit through which Hitler's orders were channelled to senior commanders and the failure of the Luftwaffe frequently drew Hitler's ire. At one conference Göring attempted to placate Hitler by suggesting that the destruction of German cities worked in the Nazi favour, as he perceived it created a body of people with nothing to lose and who "will therefore fight on with utter fanaticism".

Göring was reluctant to allocate resources to the defence of Germany for other reasons. He argued that the German people had survived before there were cities and that the Soviet danger was the priority of the Luftwaffe. Even at this stage of the war, in October 1943, Göring exhibited a bias toward bombers rather than fighters. He said, "All they [the German people] wish to hear when a hospital or a children's home in Germany is destroyed is that we have destroyed the same in England!".

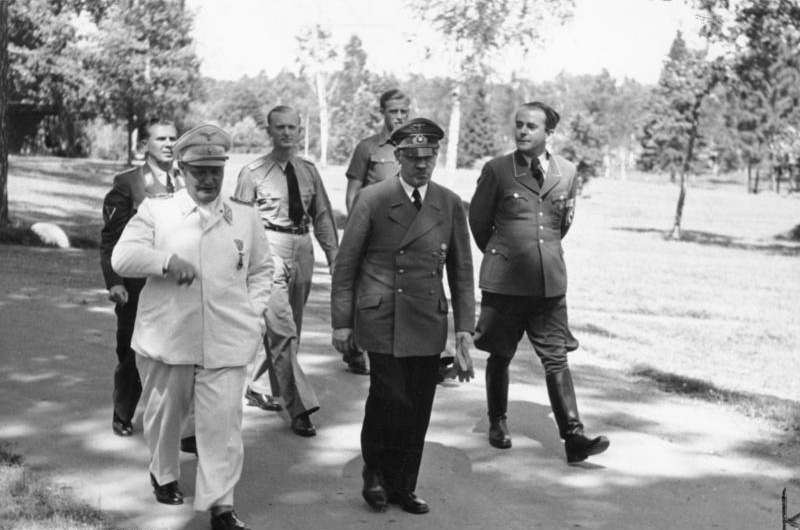
Göring with Hitler and Albert Speer, 10 August 1943. Göring favoured the bomber over the fighter even at this time.

The strategic dilemma facing the Luftwaffe in the winter of 1943–1944 was a serious one. Oberkommando der Luftwaffe (OKL, High Command of the Air Force) sought to change the Luftwaffe procurement priorities to the defensive. Erhard Milch—responsible to the Reichsluftfahrtministerium ("Reich Aviation Ministry"—RLM) for production—recommended doubling fighter production to strengthen Germany's defences. The overwhelming consensus at OKL was that German air power should concentrate resources on defensive efforts against the Allied Air Forces. After a meeting with senior Luftwaffe staff officers Adolf Galland—General der Jagdflieger (General of the Fighter Force)—wrote,

Never before and never again did I witness such determination and agreement among the circle of those responsible for the leadership of the Luftwaffe. It was as though under the impact of the Hamburg catastrophe everyone put aside either personal or departmental ambitions. There was no conflict between the General Staff and the war industry, no rivalry between bombers and fighters; only the common will to do everything in this critical hour for the Defence of the Reich.

Milch proposed to accelerate fighter production to 2,000 per month. The defence of the Reich was to take priority and the Eastern Front air units would have to cope until the threat from Bomber Command, the American Eighth Air Force operating from England and the Fifteenth Air Force in North Africa and Italy, had been mastered. Hitler maintained the Luftwaffe was an offensive weapon. For his part, Göring doubted that the night fighter was worth the expense. Göring complained bitterly to Milch that he was "placing too much emphasis on the Reich's defence and for robbing production from the bomber forces". Milch's proposals were finally agreed to but it was Göring, not the staff officers, that took this proposal to Hitler. After an hour, Göring returned. Dietrich Peltz described the scene,

We were met with a shattering picture. Göring had completely broken down. With his head buried in his arms on the table he moaned some indistinguishable words. We stood there for some time in embarrassment until at last he pulled himself together and said we were witnessing the deepest moments of despair. The Führer had lost faith in him. All the suggestions from which he had expected a radical change in the situation of war in the air had been rejected; the Führer had announced that the Luftwaffe had disappointed him too often, and a change over from the offensive to defensive in the air against England was out of the question.

After a time Göring announced that the only way to stop such destruction was to retaliate against the Allies so that they would not dare risk another raid like Hamburg, without the fear of similar retribution. Göring gave Peltz instructions to assemble a retaliation force. A change from the offensive to defensive in the air against England was out of the question. On 28 November 1943, Peltz was summoned to a conference where Göring officially informed him that he was to be placed in command of a new, large bombing operation against Britain and London in particular. As the conference ended, Göring asked Peltz if older types such as the Dornier Do 217 were still adequate for bombing operations. Peltz replied that he would be happy with anything that could carry a bomb. It was hoped that the operation would commence during December and though this proved unrealistic, by the third week of January 1944 a force approaching 600 aircraft had been amassed by stripping five Kampfgruppen (bomber groups) from the Italian front and by rebuilding bomber units in the West. On 3 December 1943 Göring issued a directive for Unternehmen Steinbock (Operation Capricorn), with the objective of "avenging terror attacks of the enemy".

== German forces ==
Three years after the Blitz, the Luftwaffe still possessed a mix of first-generation medium bomber designs like the Junkers Ju 88. The Junkers design was upgraded and the Junkers Ju 188 was derived from it and was available in 1943. The other main medium bomber was Dornier Do 217, a larger and upgraded version of the Dornier Do 17 light bomber design. The Heinkel He 177A was the only genuine heavy bomber in the fleet, which had serious powerplant difficulties from its beginnings.

The Do 217 and Ju 88A-4 carried the burden of operations. These designs had been in use for operations over Britain from 1941/42 and had been used extensively by Luftflotte 3 (Air Fleet 3), based in France and Belgium. The Do 217 could carry a heavier bomb load than its predecessor owing to a deepened fuselage. However, the German practice of using external bomb racks meant nearly 40 per cent of the 4,000 kg load was carried outside the aircraft. The Ju 88 carried nearly two-thirds of its load externally.

The two machines mounted adequate defensive firepower – four to six modern machine guns, heavy machine guns and even 20mm autocannon in the Ju 88 and six to seven in the Do 217 – the confined space and 75-round magazines made it difficult to sustain concentrated fire against night fighters. The close proximity of the crews in the cockpit, a feature of nearly all German bomber designs from the Ju 88A onwards, was also a disadvantage. Should a night fighter land an accurate burst most, if not all of the crew, could be killed or incapacitated. The layout of Allied bombers, like the B-17 Flying Fortress, spread the crew throughout the aircraft and allowed for a greater chance of survival.

The German bombers were afforded some protection in the form of the new, mid-VHF band prefixed Funk-Gerät (or FuG) FuG 216 Neptun radar system, usable both as an airborne intercept system (as a replacement for the post-July 1944 compromised Lichtenstein SN-2 system) and as a tail-warning radar, which could detect approaching RAF night fighters from the rear. To confuse British radars further various medium bomber types were equipped with Kettenhund radar jammers, specifically carried in the Ju 88, which had some effect in jamming the upper-VHF band, 205 MHz frequency SCR-268 gun laying radar used by anti-aircraft artillery, but was ineffective in countering microwave-frequency radars like the 3 GHz frequency, SCR-584 radar. German bombers also used Düppel (chaff) techniques to confound British ground radar as they approached the British coast. The tin foil strips swamped the radar screens and masked the true height, direction and speed of approaching bombers.

Apart from the numbers of conventional medium and heavy bombers, the Luftwaffe also employed a number of fast bomber types such as the Ju 88S-1 — a streamlined version of the Ju 88A using unitised BMW 801 radials and omitting the Bola undernose gondola — the DB 603-powered Messerschmitt Me 410 Hornisse Schnellbomber, and a number of single-engine fighter-bombers Messerschmitt Bf 109Gs and longer-ranged Focke-Wulf Fw 190As, known as Jabos in the Luftwaffe. These aircraft were more difficult to intercept due to their great speed, but carried limited payload and with less accuracy compared to the conventional bombers. The Ju 88S-1 was allotted the role of pathfinder, replacing the younger but slower and heavier Do 217.

Luftflotte 3, under the command of Generalfeldmarschall Hugo Sperrle was to carry out the bulk of the operation. Göring ordered that Luftflotte 2 transfer control of two gruppen (groups) of Kampfgeschwader 30, one from Kampfgeschwader 54, and Kampfgeschwader 76 to Luftflotte 3. II./Kampfgeschwader 6, I./Kampfgeschwader 100 and I./Kampfgeschwader 51 were also sequestered for Steinbock.

Göring ordered that operational strength was to be maintained in the event of an Allied landing in France and to maintain pressure on Britain and that bombers were to carry a mixed ordnance load, consisting of 70 per cent incendiaries and 30 per cent high explosive bombs—including large 1 t (1.1 short tons) bombs and mines for maximum destruction. German bombers were to be well-dispersed and parked in revetments. Dummy airfields were set up in accordance with Göring's orders. The Reichsmarschall was now fully aware of British night fighter intruder operations and the threat of Allied bombing attacks. From June to December 1943, German bomber losses in 17 major attacks in England amounted to 48 aircraft in 948 sorties, a loss rate of 5.06 per cent. RAF defences were far stronger than in 1941 and German losses would have been higher if operations not been restricted to coastal rather than inland targets.

=== Order of battle ===
The following is a list of the German bomber units ready to participate in Steinbock on 20 January 1944:

Unit	Type	No.	Ready	Place
Stab./Kampfgeschwader 2	Do 217	3	3	Zeist, Netherlands
I./Kampfgeschwader 2	Do 217	3	3	Eindhoven, Netherlands
II./Kampfgeschwader 2	Ju 188	35	35	Münster–Handorf, Germany
III./Kampfgeschwader 2	Do 217, Ju 188	38	36	Gilze en Rijen, Netherlands
V./Kampfgeschwader 2	Me 410	27	25	Laon–Athies, Somme, France
Stab./Kampfgeschwader 6	Ju 188	3	3	Brussels–Melsbroek, Belgium
I./Kampfgeschwader 6	Ju 188	41	41	Chièvres, Belgium
II./Kampfgeschwader 6	Ju 88	39	39	Le Culot, Belgium
III./Kampfgeschwader 6	Do 217	41	37	Brussels–Melsbroek, Belgium
II./Kampfgeschwader 30	Ju 88	36	31	Sint-Truiden, Belgium
I. & II./Kampfgeschwader 40	He 177A-3	15	15	Châteaudun, France
Stab./Kampfgeschwader 54	Ju 88	3	3	Marx, south-west of Wilhelmshaven, Germany
I./Kampfgeschwader 54	Ju 88	36	25	Wittmund–Jever, Germany
II./Kampfgeschwader 54	Ju 88	33	33	Marx, south-west of Wilhelmshaven, Germany
I./Kampfgeschwader 66	Ju 88, Do 217, Ju 188	45	23	Montdidier, Somme, Avord, Bourges, France
Stab./Kampfgeschwader 76	Ju 88	5	4	Alt–Lönnewitz
I./Kampfgeschwader 100	He 177A-3	31	27	Châteaudun, France
Schnellkampfgeschwader 10	Fw 190	25	20	

The composition of the force was never static. Bomber units were disbanded, pulled out for refits and conversions, or redeployed to other theatres of operation as the situation demanded. By mid-March, Peltz's force had 232 serviceable aircraft, as 3./KG 2 was withdrawn for conversion to the Ju 188, while III./KG 30, along with II. and III. Gruppen, KG 6 were redeployed to support the occupation of Hungary.

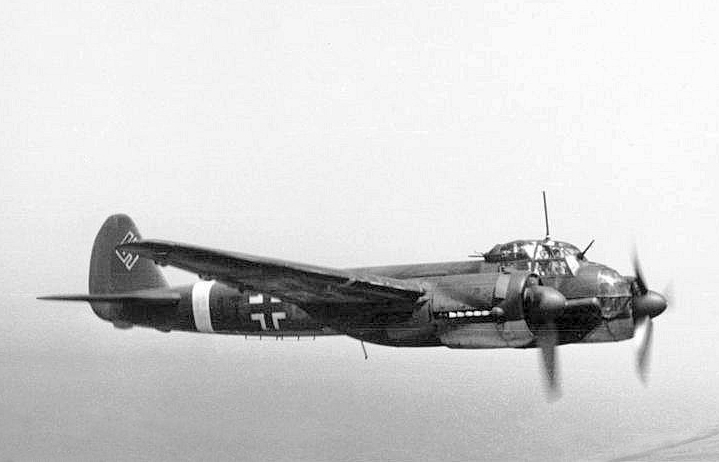
The Ju 88 was still the mainstay of the German bomber force in 1944

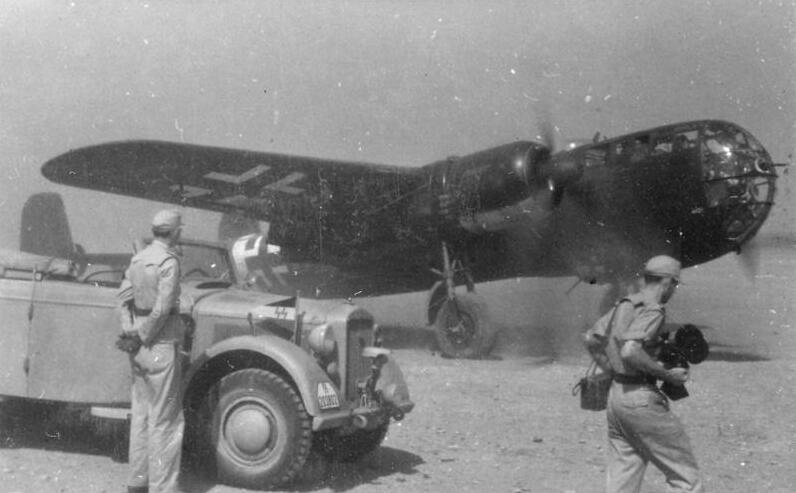
The Do 217 was also available in numbers for Steinbock

=== Tactics ===
The nature of the air war had changed significantly since 1941 and German bomber crews implemented new tactics. In the Blitz, German bombers were dispatched individually rather than in formation. Each Gruppe had been briefed to take off and bomb the target over a period of time extending anywhere up to ten hours, limiting the risk of collision. Bombers took off at an interval of four minutes, with an average spacing of 12 mi (19 km). Even with airborne radar-equipped night fighters it usually meant there was only one raider every 180 sq mi (470 km^{2}). The average operating heights of 10,000 to 20,000 ft (3,000 to 6,100 m) put one raider in every 345 cubic miles of air space. The intention was to place the British civil and anti-aircraft defences under maximum strain and to inflict greater psychological damage to the civilian population. This worked in 1940 when there was little threat from RAF Fighter Command night fighters.

In 1944, in contrast to British crews who climbed to operating altitude over Britain and maintained it until their return, German crews crossed the English Channel or North Sea at low altitude to crossing points in loose formation known as a bomber stream. German crews, like those in RAF Bomber Command, operated the bomber stream tactic in the face of vastly improved night fighter defences. Only then would they ascend to operational altitude. Once this ceiling was reached, the pilot began a shallow dive which was to be maintained beyond the target until the bomber had reached the planned minimum that was maintained until landing.

Navigational aids were available to crews in 1944. The 1940 original, Knickebein (crooked leg) stations, produced two intersecting beams. The bomber flew along one beam and released the bomb load where the two beams met. This was followed by X-Verfahren which was also a multi-beam system. X-Verfahren provided information to the pilot and observer as to the distance to the target which culminated in the automatic release of the bombs when overhead. Y-Verfahren was the final system which operated a single-beam. A ground controller monitored the aircraft and transmitted navigational guidance to the crew until the point the bombs were to be released. To further aid German navigation, I./KG 66—a special pathfinder unit—used a number of captured British GEE sets and by 2 January 1944 five of these devices were fitted to the unit's aircraft. The Luftwaffe named the devices Hyperbel Gerät (hyperbola device), but marked them Truhe Gerät (chest device).

At the beginning of 1944 a similar navigation aid, Egon, was available to the Luftwaffe which was similar to Oboe. A FuG 25a Erstling high-powered IFF transponder in the aircraft was activated by pulses transmitted by two Freya radar from stations in France and the Low Countries. A coding device identified each aircraft and their progress was plotted by range and bearing information supplied by the first Freya. Course corrections and flare release orders were usually passed on by R/T. The second Freya interjected to issue bombing instructions when it predicted the bomber was over the target.

Once crews had reached the target area they would find it marked. The first method of target–marking was the Ablauflinie (final approach) method. It was used only when the target was visible. The pathfinder would mark the area using incendiary bombs at right angles to the approach and 6 km (3.7 mi) from the edge of the planned aiming point. The crews then made a timed bomb-run when level with this (visual) line. The initial waves unloaded incendiaries on the lateral fringes of the target area to supplement the pathfinder flares. If the airspace was semi-overcast or when cloud cover was no greater than 6/10ths, seven alternating white and coloured flares would be released along the approach. As before, the distance of the start point was to be 6 km (3.7 mi) from the target area. Each pilot was to use a target marker as their aiming point. The pilot glided to the approach and released the bombs via stop-watch; the time of delay was decided at the briefing. This was known as the Leuchtpfad (path of light) method.

The short life-span of sky-marker flares meant the initial layout over the target had to be repeated for successive waves, with a different pattern for each wave. When the bomber wave fell behind or the flare faded pathfinders were briefed to lay a line of coloured flares along a 90-degree angle to the wind direction, after which target-re-illumination would be made in the same colours. If the pattern was incorrectly marked the crew were to release a second flare directly beside it. This was not easy to achieve, prolonged the bomber's orbit over the target area, and increased the pressure on crews.

The weaponry used in Steinbock was similar to that in the RAF armoury. High explosives categorised as SC (Sprengbombe Cylindrisch) were general purpose weapons, thin-cased to cause maximum damage on the surface. SD (Sprengbombe Dickwandig) had some penetrative power for armour-piercing purposes. The PC (Panzerbombe Cylindrisch), was an armour-piercing bomb. Added to ordnance were incendiaries, some also fitted with high explosive. Sea-mines were also used and ejected on the end of parachutes, although they were inaccurate. In some cases Sprengbombe Dickwandig 2 (SD2) cluster munitions were used and were highly effective against people.

Aerial mines and parachute mines were also used, and had been since 1940. These devices were classified as SC and referred to as Minenbombe. The explosives could be 50 to 1,000 kg (110 to 2,200 lb) in weight. The mine did not penetrate the surface but lay where it fell until the timer triggered an explosion which was capable of destroying buildings within a 300 ft (91 m) radius. The most common types were the Luftmine A, weighing 500 kg (1,100 lb), and 5 ft 8 in (1.73 m) long. The Luftmine B, was 8 ft 8 in (2.64 m) long and weighed 1,000 kg (2,200 lb). AB types were also used (Abwurfbehälter, large cluster bombs) and could also weigh 1,000 kg (2,200 lb).

For Steinbock, bombers were mostly to use the heavy bombs. Bombs of lesser power, such as the 500 kg (1,100 lb), were only to be used to bring each aircraft's bomb load to maximum capacity. The Luftwaffe did have some blockbuster weight-class (4,000 lb (1,800 kg)) ordnance designs ready for use: the largest bomb in use at this time was the SC1800. It weighed 1,767–1,879 kg (3,896–4,142 lb) of which 1,000 to 1,100 kg (2,200 to 2,400 lb) was high explosive detonated by an electrical impact fuse. The bomb was specifically designed to destroy buildings and it had a high-pressure blast wave. It was due to be replaced by the SC2000 which weighed in at circa 2,000 kg (4,400 lb) but it was produced in small numbers and no reliable information is available on explosive weight or filling. SC2500s were also known to have been used during Steinbock carried by the He 177A-3s.

=== EGON navigation system ===
The Lorenz blind-landing equipment had been the basis for the Knickebein although results were disappointing, partly because of British countermeasures spearheaded by No. 80 Wing RAF under the command of Edward Addison which inhibited its use as a bombing aid. A similar adaptation of existing equipment in the form of I.F.F sets (FuG 25 and FuG 25a Erstling) brought into existence Egonverfahren, a ground-control procedure for crews on bomber operations. For Steinbock it was made available to the pathfinder unit I./KG 66.

The system was based upon signals radiated by the FuG 25 and picked up by two Freya stations. The operator of the first Freya plotted the course of the bomber and the second Freya took over for the final bomb/flare release run. Operators transmitted information by Morse code using terminology borrowed from the night fighter force. Prior to take-off, crews were given a course and height to the target. The height was rigidly adhered to since it could not be checked by ground control. After take-off the FuG 25 was switched on and the first Freya plotted the aircraft's course using the single letter recognition code transmitted from the bomber. The range and bearing was passed by the Freya operators to the plotting table. The plotting table was a transparent map of the operations area laid on a glass screen. The bomber was represented by a red spot from a projector connected to the Freya. The pathfinder's course could be observed and corrected. Course correction instructions were picked up in the aircraft through a FuG 16 set.

The crew were equipped with a list of twelve orders which were submitted through R/T or W/T (each method having its own specific code) with each code having the same meaning. The twelve codes communicated several different orders which included: informing the crew they were being plotted; change of bearing; degree of bearings (made in multiples of five); port or starboard turns; height; straight and level course; open bombs doors; pre-release signal; bomb or flare release; acknowledgement of signal; return home. The crew responded by switching the set off for three to four seconds to acknowledge receipt of the signal or repeatedly switched off the FuG 25 to indicate they had not received it.

When the British radio counter-measures began to interfere with messages the Luftwaffe broadcast in both W/T and R/T format over two channels. The FuG 16 would handle incoming transmissions from the R/T frequencies and the W/T messages were received by the Peilgerät (PeilG) 6 (codenamed "Alex Sniatkowski") direction finding equipment and superimposed on the plotting table. Further improvements were made to combat British counter-measures with the introduction of a CRT linked to the FuG 25 set, similar in size to the Lichtenstein radar equipment used by night fighters. The CRT display consisted of a circle divided into equal segments, each marked and representing one of the twelve code words and orders. The inner circle had a surrounding frame marked clockwise from zero to nine (with zero in the 12 o'clock position). A blip appeared in the segment for the appropriate code word. Bearings were given by a second (central) blip that appeared against a succession of figures in the outer circle. Course corrections were given by a long and short blips against the appropriate segment.

== British defences ==
The RAF was warned of an impending attack on 23 December 1943 by Ultra. The Germans had been hoping to use V-1 flying bombs but the attack on Kassel in October 1943 had forced the abandonment of the Fieseler factory where the pilot series was constructed. The missile prototypes proved disappointing in tests and RAF intelligence discovered that the Luftwaffe was assembling a large conventional bomber fleet in western Europe for an attack.

In late 1943, the RAF was reorganised and night fighter duties were made the responsibility of Fighter Command (Air Marshal Sir Roderic Hill) which in January 1944 had 10 and No. 11 Group RAF (Air Vice Marshals Charles Steele and Hugh Saunders) who were responsible for the defence of southern England and the Ground-controlled interception (GCI) operations in these areas.

Fighter Command had sixteen squadrons of de Havilland Mosquito and Bristol Beaufighter night fighters equipped with aircraft interception (AI) radar. Most squadrons flew Mosquito Mk. XIIIs or Beaufighter Mk. VIfs, all equipped with AI radar. Both types were effective night fighters, fast and well-armed.

Four night fighter squadrons were still operating AI Mk V sets, in which the pilot had a screen as well as the AI radar operator, which encouraged him to divert his gaze from scanning the sky for targets. AI Mk V was dependent on the operator to give instructions to the pilot on heading, speed, and altitude to intercept a contact until in visual range. AI Mk VIII was in regular use by ten squadrons and allowed crews to detect targets at low altitude, without fear of ground interference blotting out contacts. AI Mk. X radar was adapted from Mk. VIII, with technology from the American SCR720B, which operated on 3 cm (1.2 in) (10 GHz, like the US H2X) and was vastly superior to the original 150 cm (59 in) (200 MHz) high VHF-band and the equivalent 10 cm (3.9 in) (3 GHz) AI Mk. VIII, which could be detected by German FuG 350ZR Naxos radar detector. AI Mk. X generated a stronger electromagnetic signal than its predecessor and produced a more reliable display, lessening the chance of the blip disappearing. AI Mk. X was in two squadrons in January 1944, with more sets on the way.

Anti-Aircraft Command (General Frederick Pile) was responsible for the ground defences of Greater London with 2,729 anti-aircraft guns, which had risen 31 per cent from 2,088 in January 1943. Many of the 3.7 inch and 4.5 inch gun anti-aircraft (AA) batteries were equipped with IFF and new GL Mk. III gun-laying radar, which made their barrage fire accurate at night, in bad weather.

=== Tactics ===
Mosquito and Beaufighter night fighters approached the six o'clock position to attack. The slipstream of the target could complicate the approach by creating turbulence and throw the pilot off his aim if he approached at the same level and more experienced fighter pilots approached from behind and slightly below. The outline of the night fighter could be obscured from the German crew and enable them to avoid the worst effects of the bomber slipstream. It became standard practice for the pilot to close on the bomber and match its speed, then lift the nose and fire ahead of the enemy aircraft so that it flew into the gunfire. Night fighter pilots cooperated with search lights and ground control until the interception could be taken over by the radar operator. From 1942 night fighter–searchlight cooperation was reorganised into a 'box' system. A box of air 44 miles (71 km) wide and 14 miles (23 km) long was created in which a night fighter circled a vertical searchlight beam (or beacon). If a German aircraft entered the box searchlights converged on the raider. The GCI could put the night fighter within a mile of the bomber and the remainder of the interception would be handled by the crew using their aircraft interception (AI) radar set. A variation was the Smack Interception method, which had been devised for single-engined fighters without AI radar. When the intruder was detected, the night fighter was scrambled and orbited the beacon. When the raider neared the area, the beacon would depress by roughly 20 degrees in the direction the fighter was to head in the hope of achieving an interception. The radar equipped-night fighters improved the chances of detecting the enemy and GCI could also help.

=== Order of battle ===
A list of the squadrons operating Mosquito and Beaufighter night fighters at the time of Steinbock: All units participated in Home Defence, with some also operating as intruder squadrons in support of Bomber Command and also against Steinbock incursions. The following claims were made between 21 January and 29 May 1944.

Unit	Type	Location	Notes	Claims during Steinbock
No. 25 Squadron RAF	Mosquito	RAF Acklington	Squadron used mainly for intruder and escort operations supporting Bomber Command.	17
No. 29 Squadron RAF	Mosquito	RAF Ford and RAF Drem	Led by Wing commander George Powell-Shedden. Converted from Beaufighters in May 1943. Transferred to the RAF Second Tactical Air Force on 1 May 1944.	10
No. 68 Squadron RAF	Mosquito/Beaufighter	RAF Fairwood Common	Formed on 7 February 1941 and remained on Home Defence duties until disbanded on 20 April 1945.	No claims by Mosquito pilots 4 claims by Beaufighter pilots
No. 85 Squadron RAF	Mosquito	RAF Debden	Led by Wing commander John Cunningham. 85 Squadron was veteran night fighter formation since 1940.	15
No. 23 Squadron RAF	Mosquito	Returning from Malta	Returned to England in May 1944 and joined No. 100 Group RAF in June.	No claims
No. 125 Squadron RAF	Mosquito	RAF Hurn	Formed at RAF Colerne on 16 June 1941. Operated as Home Defence and intruder unit.	10
No. 151 Squadron RAF	Mosquito	RAF Colerne and RAF Predannack	Reformed from day to night fighters, November 1940. It operated in the escort, Home Defence and intruder role.	10
No. 219 Squadron RAF	Mosquito	RAF Honiley and Colerne	Initially assigned to protecting shipping. On 21 February 1940, was converted to night fighters.	1
No. 157 Squadron RAF	Mosquito	RAF Predannack	The first unit to be equipped with Mosquito night fighters. Began Home Defence duties on 27 April 1943.	3
No. 169 Squadron RAF	Mosquito	RAF Little Snoring	Formed at RAF Twinwood on 15 June 1942 as a tactical reconnaissance unit. Converted to night fighting in 1943.	12
No. 264 Squadron RAF	Mosquito	RAF Church Fenton	An experienced night fighter squadron since 1940. In 1943 and 1944 it flew day and night intruder flights over France and the Bay of Biscay.	3
No. 307 Polish Night Fighter Squadron	Mosquito	RAF Drem	Formed on 5 September 1940 from Polish Air Force personnel, it was a night fighter unit from formation.	1
No. 604 Squadron RAF	Beaufighter and Mosquito	RAF Church Fenton	Developed as a night fighter squadron in September 1940. It was one of the first to receive aircraft interception (AI) radar. In April it received Mosquitos which operated alongside the older Beaufighters. Transferred to RAF Second Tactical Air Force on 26 April 1944.	3
No. 409 Squadron RCAF	Mosquito/Beaufighter	RAF Hunsdon	409 Squadron was staffed with Canadian personnel. It was seconded to the RAF Second Tactical Air Force in the intruder role. It participated in Home Defence in 1944 until 30 March when it transferred to the RAF Second Tactical Air Force and re-equipped with Mosquitos.	No claims
No. 418 Squadron RCAF	Mosquito	RAF Ford and RAF Holmsley	418 was unique among units seconded to the RAF. Though allotted to the intruder role, the squadron was not equipped with aircraft interception radar as it targeted German night fighter airfields.	Two claims 36 claims on intruder sorties
No. 488 Squadron RNZAF	Mosquito	RAF Colerne and RAF Zeals	Formed on 25 June 1942 as a night fighter unit. It remained on Home Defence until 12 May 1944, when it was allocated to the RAF Second Tactical Air Force.	15
No. 96 Squadron RAF	Mosquito	RAF Cranage	Led by Wing commander Edward Crew during Steinbock. Reformed in December 1940 after being disbanded in November 1918, the squadron was conceived as a night fighter unit at RAF Shoreham. it remained on intruder and Home Defence duties until March 1945 when it moved to the Far East.	23
No. 125 Squadron RAF	Mosquito	RAF Valley	Reformed on 16 June 1941 the squadron was assigned to Home Defence for the duration of Steinbock.	10
No. 141 Squadron RAF	Mosquito/Beaufighter	RAF West Raynham	141 Squadron was a former day fighter squadron converted to night fighters in 1941. It was a veteran formation operating in the intruder capacity. Joined No. 100 Group RAF on 4 December 1943.	12 claims on intruder operations (two possible claims opposing Steinbock)
No. 410 Squadron RCAF	Mosquito	RAF West Malling	Moved to West Malling in October 1943. Operated exclusively in Home Defence roles in 1943 and 1944. 410 transferred to the RAF Second Tactical Air Force on 12 May 1944.	15
No. 515 Squadron RAF	Mosquito	RAF Little Snoring	Formed on 1 October 1942. Operated Boulton Paul Defiant and Bristol Blenheim until December 1943. Equipped with Mosquitos at the end of 1943.	3
No. 605 Squadron RAF	Mosquito	RAF Bradwell Bay and RAF Manston	Served in India and the Far East from 1942 before returning to Britain. During Steinbock it operated in Home Defence and intruder roles.	6 intruder claims over Belgium and France; A further 6 claims unrelated to Steinbock
No. 456 Squadron RAAF	Mosquito	RAF Fairwood Common and RAF Ford	Led by Wing commander Keith Hampshire, the squadron's leading night fighter pilot. 456 was a Royal Australian Air Force unit, formed in June 1941 and deactivated in June 1945.	20 claims against Steinbock operations
No. 406 Squadron RCAF	Beaufighter	RAF Predannack	The squadron was formed at RAF Acklington on 5 May 1941 (No. 12 Group) to operate as night fighters.	3

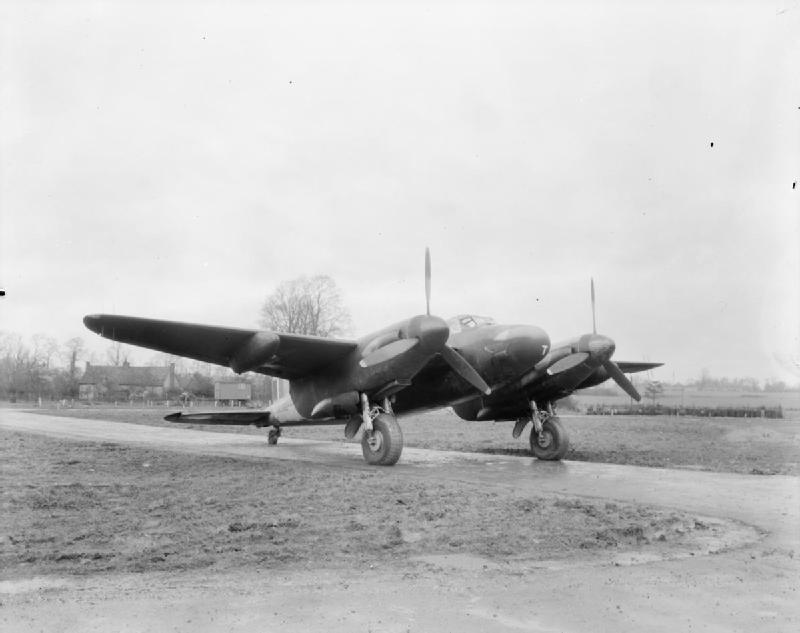
Mosquito NF Mark XIII, HK382 'RO-T', 29 Squadron, at Hunsdon, Hertfordshire with "thimble" nose radome in which AI Mk. VIII radar centimetric radar is fitted

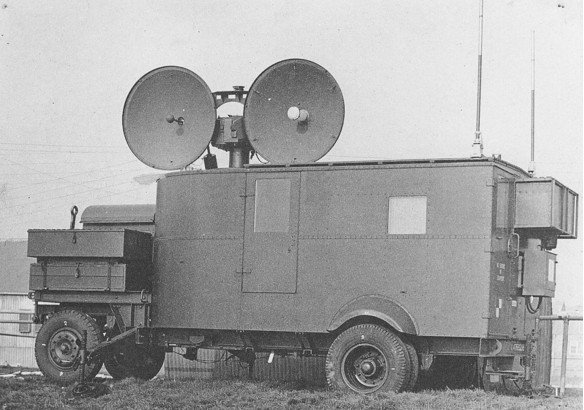
A mobile GL Mk. III radar set, capable of gun laying (predictive fire)

== The operation ==
=== January ===
==== 2–15 January ====
The Luftwaffe was already in action on night operations over Britain before Steinbock was formally initiated. The first intrusions into British airspace in 1944 occurred on the night of the 2/3 January. Me 410s from KG 2 and Fw 190s from SKG 10 penetrated into Kent, Sussex, Surrey, London, Berkshire and Hertfordshire and one person was killed by scattered bombs. The intruders suffered for their efforts: four Fw 190s were shot down with two pilots killed in action and two missing in action. One of the machines fell to a Mosquito from 96 Squadron. One Ju 188 from 2./KG 66 was lost and two Me 410s (from 14. Staffel and 16./KG 2) were shot down—Wing Commander John Cunningham accounting for one of the Messerschmitts.

On the night of the 4/5 January six children and four adults were killed when the Luftwaffe targeted Westcott, Surrey. Five of the attackers were lost, three of them falling to the RAF (85 and 96 Squadrons). (Note: One Fw 190G-3 was lost from 3./SKG 10; Feldwebel Hermann Heinrich Greeve was killed. KG 2 lost two one Do 217s were their crews. 1./KG 66 lost two Ju 88S-1s with their crews. Three of the four the bomber crews perished.) German air activity continued from 13 to 15 January. Five more civilians were killed and 33 injured. Two Me 410s, a Ju 188, two Ju 88s and two Fw 190s were lost. Only two of the raiders are known to have fallen to enemy action.

==== First attack ====
The first attack on London was mounted on the night of 21/22 January. Just twenty-four hours earlier nearly 800 British bombers had struck Berlin. Codenamed Unternehmen Mars (Operation Mars), sections of the British capital were given codenames after devastated German cities—Berlin, Hamburg, Hannover—to emphasise the retaliatory nature of the operation for the air crews. The first target—Waterloo—was codenamed München (Munich).

Peltz ordered the units, based on 14 airfields from Soesterberg in the Netherlands, St. Trond east of Brussels, Belgium and Montdidier near Paris to operational readiness. Peltz drove to Châteaudun, the forward operating base of I./KG 40 and I./KG 100 equipped with the Heinkel He 177A-3 — committed to their first operations deep into British airspace. There, he notified the senior commanders Geschwaderkommodore (Wing Commanders) Oberst Rupprecht Heyn and Oberstleutnant Bernhard Jope that the attack was to be executed in three waves. Peltz also notified those units in Germany that they were to transfer to their forward bases. They were to return to their forward base after the first sortie but were ordered to relocate to Germany directly after the second to avoid night intruders and Allied bombers.

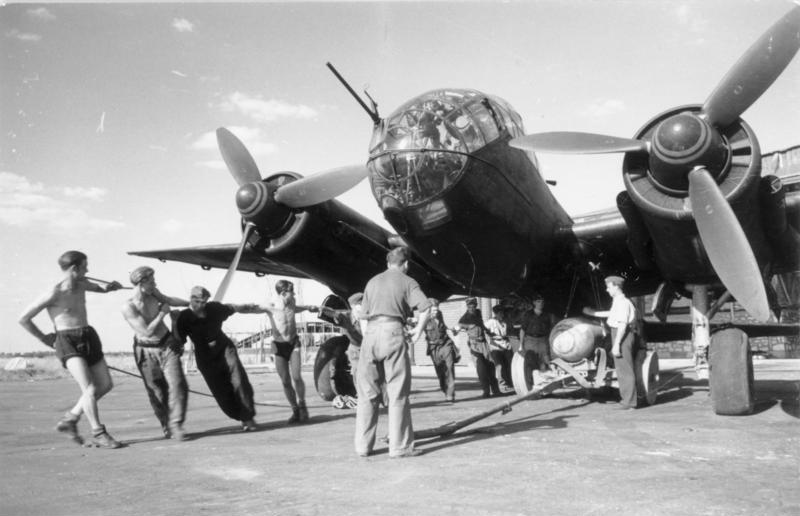
Ju 188, from KG 6 being prepared for operations

II./KG 54 and I./KG 76 were an example of this caution, moving out from Marx to Laon and Varrelbusch to Laon respectively. The nomadic methods of the Luftwaffe during Steinbock complicated preparations. Airfield staff were given short notice and insufficient time to prepare airfields to accept the bombers. Only one Ju 188 from KG 2 took part in the first operation because of administrative failings.

The first raid was on München—the Waterloo area of London. The attack was to be carried out using Leuchtpfad tactics—with the target marked with incendiaries. Pathfinders were expected to carry out plotting easily, since the weather forecast the necessary visibility. On the first night Egon and Y-Verfahren were available to pinpoint the target with flares. From Montdidier, Staffelkapitän Hauptmann Schmidt, 2./KG 66, took off with a captured Gee set aboard his Ju 188 as he followed the bomber stream northward. An estimated 230 aircraft, carrying a total load of 500 tons of bombs and incendiaries, took off between 19:30 and 20:00 CET.

Despite the extensive use of Düppel and pathfinders, German navigation errors were rife: only 15 bombers attacked London. Thirty tons were estimated to have fallen on the capital, with most other bombs scattered throughout the Home Counties. In the case of II./KG 54, the crews proceeded by dead reckoning and crossed the coast at Rye at an altitude of 16,000 ft (4,900 m) as ordered. They descended to the target and completed their bomb run by 21:15 at 13,000 ft. The position of most continental airfields ensured the bombers streamed out along a cone-shaped flight path in the airspace between the Sussex and Essex coasts. British radar picked the first wave up at approximately 20:30 CET. Over 100 aircraft were recorded over the next ninety minutes from ground control radar sites between Hastings and Dungeness.

The Luftwaffe lost 18 bombers, three over Britain, seven at sea and eight over Europe. Among the losses were six He 177A-3s of KG 40 and nine Ju 88s. Three Ju 188s and a single Do 217 and Fw 190 were also lost. Four are known to have become victims of Mosquitos from 488, 29 and 151 Squadrons and 27 German airmen were posted missing, 23 were killed and eight captured. A further five were wounded.

==== Second wave ====
A second wave was dispatched in the early hours of the morning. The weather deteriorated and cloud led to the use of Y-Verfahren—electronic aids—to enable the pathfinders to reach the target area. British counter measures usually disrupted the signals at this point; it is not clear whether British jamming was effective but the first results were repeated. Barely half the 200 bombers crossed the English coast and only 25 were judged to have released their bombs on London.

The experience of I./KG 76, perhaps underlined the problems crews faced on the night. After take-off from Laon/Couvron, their route was fixed at 232° true to a radio beacon (funkfeuer) at Luzarches. The route sent them north-west to searchlights at Valery-en-Caux and continued across the Channel. A third alteration came at Eastbourne which took them due north to London. The bomb-run commenced at 14,000 ft (4,300 m) and was scheduled for completion at 5:30. North-westerly winds of 40 km/h (25 mph) were experienced by the crews at 1,500 metres (4,900 feet) and 80 km/h (50 mph) at 4,000 metres (13,000 feet). In the earlier operation KG 40 also experienced winds of up to 100 km/h (62 mph) on a westerly course. The weather could have been a factor in dispersing the bomber streams. During the raid I. and II./ KG 30 flew their only Steinbock operation until March. The first operation coincided with the Operation Shingle the Allied landings at Anzio and immediately three of the Kampfgruppen were returned to Italy.

The second wave lost another 18 bombers plus two on non-operational sorties. KG 2 was particularly hard hit, losing six aircraft—four Do 217s, a Ju 188 and an Me 410 and KG 6 lost five. Night fighters were thought to have shot down four bombers and two fell to ground fire; the fate of the others remains unknown. Personnel losses amounted to 49 killed and missing in action, five wounded in action and six prisoners of war; the remainder reached German territory uninjured. Fighter Command Mosquito squadrons claimed 10 German aircraft destroyed and two probables on 21/22 January 1944.

The damage done was small: four fires, 74 civilians killed, 12 seriously injured and five wounded. A notable fatality was Group Captain Jack Goodhart who was killed with his family when a bomb hit their home in East Hoathly. Of the 268 tonnes of bombs dropped, 32 fell on London. In the Alperton area of Wembley 500–600 incendiaries were reported to have fallen in a 220,000 square yard area, though 100 did not ignite. The Palace of Westminster was struck by some of these bombs and the medieval beams in the building caught fire but these were quickly extinguished. RAF Kenley was struck by unexploded bombs and the following areas were hit: Downham, Bromley, Beckenham, Brockley and Sydenham.

British reports stated minor damage was done to essential locations. The most serious damage to a factory occurred to Vickers Armstrong, based in Dartford. The factory was producing shells and fuse fillings. Three high explosives destroyed the General Store, a light fitting shop and the magnesium stores; severed the gas and sewage mains outside the works and cut the telephone lines. Gas supplies were reduced to 50 per cent and two days of production were lost. The Royal Arsenal at Woolwich was also damaged, causing fires. Some railway lines were damaged or threatened by unexploded bombs, which forced speed restrictions of five mph.

==== Second operation ====
On 28/29 January 16 Me 410s and 10 Fw 190s made attacks without effect and loss. One Mosquito was lost when it crashed into the sea after an engine caught fire. A Junkers Ju 52 was shot down by a night fighter over Spa, Belgium with the loss of 23 ground personnel belonging to KG 6.

Eight days later, Steinbock was renewed with 11 Gruppen. II./KG 2 made its debut and II. and III./KG 30 participated but would not feature again until 14/15 March. The He 177s of I./KG 40 were permanently withdrawn. In addition I./KG 100 and I./SKG 10 were absent, probably because of their participation the previous night.

I./KG 54 were ordered to attack the districts east of Tower Bridge with Hackney the epicentre of the bombing. An Ablauflinie would be laid but specific crews would fly to the right of the line and drop their ordnance above the right hand boundary of the marked zone. All of the bombers were to complete their bomb run by 21:09. The course of the crews was aided by a rotating searchlight at Dalen. Further aids were rendered by dropping Luz buoys in the sea off Ostend. The bombers crossed over East Anglia at 5,000 metres (16,000 feet) using Colchester as a reference point. A descent to 3,000 metres (9,800 feet) for the bomb run was made and the crew retreated out over the Essex coast. It appears the unit operated the Knickebein navigational aid on the operation, using the station at Calais.

KG 6 began their operation from Vechta in Germany. II./KG 6 took a path similar to KG 54 with the exception they would head to their normal operating base at Le Culot. The group flew a loose formation and did not reach oxygen-altitude until 90 minutes after take-off. I./KG 76 headed for their Funkfeuer near the German–Dutch border. From there, they used navigational aids. This formation was to return to Varrelbusch in Germany and were to land in France only if bad weather intervened.

Only 15 to 30 bombers from the night's groups struck the target. Nevertheless, the small number of aircraft caused 145 fires—four classified as medium and 141 small—and killed 41 civilians including one soldier on leave. At Ramsden Heath, Essex a bomb hit the British Army camp and depending on the numerous reports, the number of dead ranged from three to 23. Finsbury Park and Stoke Newington were also hit. SS Fort Louisbourg in Greenland Dock was damaged and lost some of its copra cargo. Surrey Docks also reported damage. Barges were also sunk or damaged at Canada Dock. Around 7,000 incendiary bombs fell in Dagenham; among them were phosphorus types.

Seven KG 6 bombers were lost—with only one crew from 4. Staffel surviving a crash landing in Belgium. KG 2 lost two bombers, KG 40 one, KG 54 four, and KG 66 and KG 76 lost one each. Three were probably downed by night fighters and another was lost to ground fire. 53 airmen were killed or missing and six were captured.

Hitler was reportedly outraged that the Luftwaffe failed to find London though it was only 150–200 km (93–124 mi) from German ground control stations while the British were hitting German towns, not just city targets, from 1,000 km (620 mi) away in bad weather. Peltz responded that the failures owed as much to the Luftwaffe's lack of interference-free radio and navigational aids as to untrained crews, and that the British with their H2S and Gee systems were technologically ahead of the Germans.

The lack of dedicated pathfinder units also caused navigational problems, as the few aircraft employed in this role were more at risk from electronic counter-measures and fighter interception. The heavy British defences forced the Luftwaffe to fly meandering 'dog-leg' courses and inexperienced German crews quickly got lost. Reconnaissance flights over England had also stopped, which prevented the Luftwaffe from gathering intelligence on British radar and radio frequency bands.

=== February ===
==== Third major attack ====
The first operation of February occurred on the 3rd and 4th of the month. I./KG 100 and SKG 10 mustered 26 Me 410s and 19 Fw 190s which crossed the Channel between 19:00 and 19:30. They released a mix of SC250 and SC500 bombs and two Fw 190s failed to return. The second wave took off on the night of the 4th from 04:25 with their operation lasting 95 minutes. German propaganda claimed 210 of the 235 bombers struck their targets and caused large fires and the communiqué derided British defences as weak.

The report was exaggerated. British sources showed the attacks to be scattered, with areas as far as Gloucestershire, Wiltshire, Bedfordshire and Suffolk being bombed, indicating the wayward standards of German navigation. Peltz was ordered to brief Göring on the night's operation. When the Reichsmarschall discovered the results, he ordered Peltz to operate on moon lit nights to ease navigational difficulties. Peltz, however, refused as he wished to avoid exposing bombers to easier interception by RAF night fighters. However, this course of action relied heavily on pathfinders to mark the target accurately.

Only 25 of the 190 ton of bombs released fell on London. Fires were started in Hackney, Wimbledon and Tilbury. The operation killed 17 and injured 12 in the capital. Some 27 houses were destroyed, 48 seriously damaged and 320 suffered minor damage. In Wimbledon, five civilians were killed and six seriously injured. There were also fatalities from unexploded British anti-aircraft shells which killed two people. Total casualties that night amounted to 31 killed and 88 injured. German bombers strayed again and Upper Slaughter in Gloucestershire received 2,000 incendiary hits. Upper Clapton was ablaze when it became the target of a sustained incendiary attack.

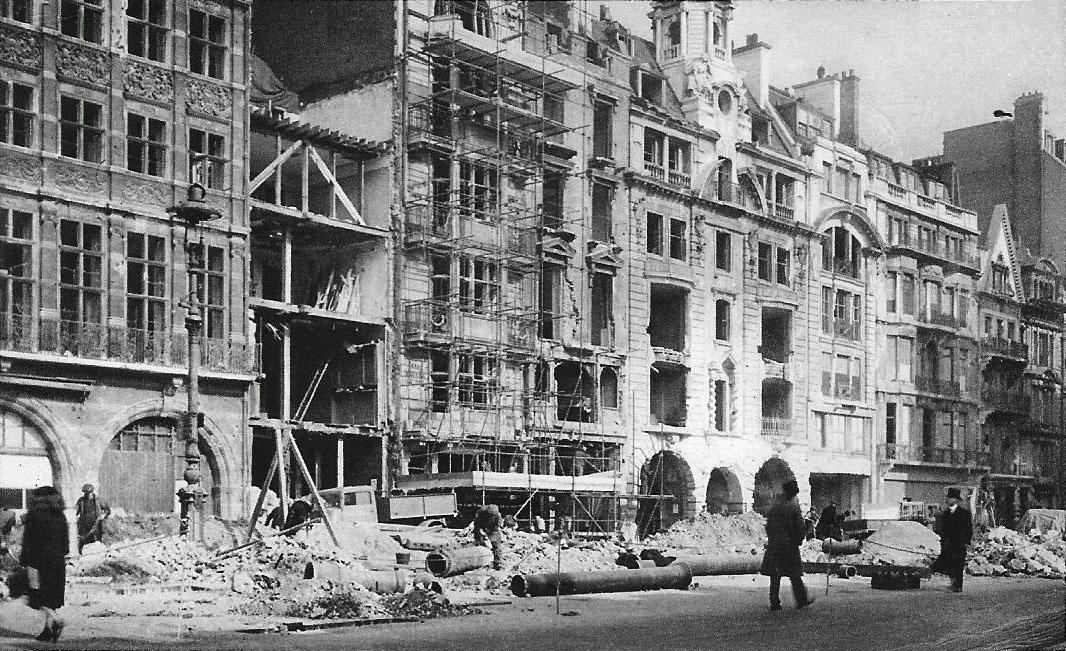
Pall Mall, London after a Steinbock raid February 1944

The Luftwaffe command viewed the night's operation with alarm. Of the 15 bombers lost, only one fell in Britain and one crashed in Belgium. The remaining 11 presumably vanished over the sea. KG 6 bore the brunt of the losses as six of its aircraft were lost and one damaged. KG 2 and KG 54 lost two respectively and KG 6 lost one machine. One of the missing aircraft, Ju 88, 2./KG 54, code B3+EK piloted by Unteroffizier Helmut Friedrich Weihs was discovered with its crew in the Zuiderzee in the 1970s by the Dutch Air Force excavating the wreck when the area was drained for land reclamation. In total 50 German airmen were reported missing and five were confirmed killed. None were known to have been captured alive.

==== Further failure ====
On 13/14 February II./KG 54 and SKG 10 were left off the operations roster but all the other 10 groups were available for a large-scale thrust. German sources indicate that 230 crews took part in the night's operation.

Peltz was aware that Steinbock was not materialising as Hitler and Göring had hoped. He personally visited I./KG 100 which had prepared its He 177s as to be mostly operational. He spoke with Geschwaderkommodore Bernhard Jope and his crews for a second time. One aspect of his speech to the crews was to play down the threat of British night fighters. He claimed that only 30 British crews operated against the raid of the 3/4 February and that only a third were under GCI. His remarks were likely a morale booster rather than rooted in fact. It was true that Fighter Command night fighter forces were smaller than its Nachtjagd counterpart defending the continent, but German bombers were arriving in much smaller numbers.

The temperature at Châteaudun was chilly but Peltz observed the He 177s being readied for take-off. Because of the conditions, the ground crews began the cold start procedure. This decision had dire consequences for the operation. One bomber remained grounded because of a burst tyre but the other 13 took off without incident. Within a short time Peltz was informed that eight pilots had aborted the mission because of over-heating engines, which in some instances caught fire.

Around 70 per cent of the German force was tracked by the British but once again only 15 of the dispersed bombers hit the London area. On this night the holiday resort of Clacton-on-Sea and St Osyth were badly damaged. A cinema and several commercial premises were destroyed and a farmer lost a large number of livestock: six horses, 30 cows and 17 ewes. They caused 14 medium and 84 small fires, mostly in East Anglia. Casualties in London amounted to one killed and six seriously injured. Overall, there were seven killed, 11 seriously wounded and two missing believed dead amongst the civilian population. Four tons of bombs was dropped on London and 157 in Kent and Essex. The number of bombs counted on land was 57,525—most of which were incendiaries.

10 German bombers were lost—one each to 96 and 410 Squadron Mosquitos and two to ground-fire. Wing Commander Edward Crew claimed the Ju 88 of Stab of II./KG 6, code 3E+DC, Werknummer 63868. Pilot Leutnant Egon Ruhland and his crew were killed. KG 66 lost five this night. 33 German airmen were killed, two wounded and two captured.

Returning German pilots reported a steady increase in the concentration of gun fire from anti-aircraft batteries over London although this was not reflected by a noticeable increase in losses. At de-briefing pilots reported they did not take any special evasive action but they avoided areas where heavy concentrations of guns and rocket batteries (or Z Battery) were marked on their maps. Crews reported rocket salvos in an area of 1.5 to two miles in diameter over central London which were repeated at four-minute intervals but only the Hyde Park battery was in a position to disrupt the bomb run. The perceived effectiveness of London's defences may have caused inexperienced crews to drop their bombs too early and miss the target, rather than failing to do so because of navigational errors.

==== Steinbock takes effect ====
On the night of the 18/19 February the Luftwaffe managed to deliver a successful attack on London. According to British intelligence, 175 crews participated. German sources say 184 bombers reached the target area. The attack heralded almost nightly attacks which lasted until the early hours of 24 February. The degree of material damage and human casualties this night reached an all-time high during Steinbock. It was the most damaging single attack since 31 May/1 June 1941.

Integral to the night's operations were I./KG 100 and II. and III./KG 2. The former unit appears to have been relocated from the Rheine to Evreux on the day of the attack. KG 2 operated from Coulommiers and Brétigny opposed to their Dutch airfields at Soesterberg and Gilze–Rijen. All other units operated from their normal aerodromes.

The German bomber stream reached the city and bombed accurately. High explosives fell on RAF Earls Colne and two AB1000 containers and eight SC50 bombs fell just short of RAF Debden. More bombs struck the United States Army Air Forces airfield Willingale. Airfields at Panshanger and Nuthampstead and the RAF Balloon Command at Chigwell also reported bombs falling on the location or nearby. Around 480 fires were caused by German ordnance. 179 civilians were killed and 484 seriously injured. A further 65 were reported missing in the following days. Essex Police forces reported black strips all over Essex. But despite the use of Düppel around 120 of the raiders were plotted and detected by British radar.

Willesden was badly hit; Dollis Hill, the anti-aircraft battery at Gladstone Park, the Heinz factory at Harlesden, St Cuthbert's, Earls Court, West Hampstead, Kensington were all hit. A bridge at Goldhawk Road tube station was destroyed cutting the London Underground between Latimer Road tube station and Hammersmith until 9 March 1944. The Whitelands College was also damaged and the surrounding borough of Putney was hit by a concentration of incendiaries. Water mains were shattered in Whitehall, Battersea, West Hill, Highbury, Chelsea and Wandsworth. In Chingford, over 200 houses were damaged and in Barnes a chemical plant was destroyed.

The Luftwaffe did not escape unscathed. No. 418 (Canadian) Squadron flew an intruder sortie over France that night. Only 3./KG 54 seem to have suffered from intruder Mosquitos, when it lost two shot down near Laon. German losses amounted to nine: four from KG 66, two from KG 54, one from KG 2 and two from KG 6. The Luftwaffe lost 20 men killed, 12 missing and four wounded.

==== 20/21 February ====
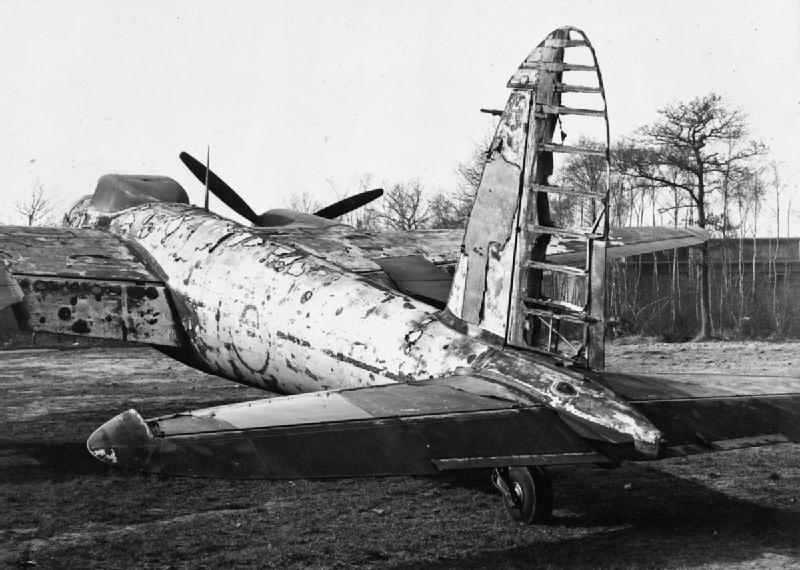
An 85 Squadron Mosquito destroyed a Ju 88S-1, Z6+HH from 1./KG 66 but was caught in the explosion which burnt off the fabric covering.

On 20/21 February the sixth Steinbock attack began. Big Week by the RAF and USAAF had begun the day before, with an RAF Bomber Command attack on Leipzig the night before, followed by an 8th Air Force thousand-bomber daylight raid on 20 February. Twelve German bomber groups with 165 aircraft participated in the raid Included in the armada were 15 Fw 190s from SKG 10. I./KG 100 operated from the Rheine and II./KG 54 from Varrelbusch. I./KG 54 and II./KG 2 began the operation from Münster and Handorf, although Juvincourt, Coulommiers and Soesterberg were used by these formations during Steinbock.

II./KG 54, I./KG 100, I./KG 54, I. and II./KG 2 rendezvoused over the Dutch coast at the Funkfeuer at Noordwijk. The force numbered from 90 to 100 bombers. Landfall was made on the Essex coast near the Thames Estuary. The crews had no pathfinders and relied on dead reckoning. The crews were briefed to fly from the north then bank left and carry out a bomb-run from west to east across the city, according to crews captured on the night. Examination of crashed German aircraft showed that four Knickebein and two Sonne units were available for guidance. I./KG 100 and KG 54 were in the vanguard of the assault; KG 2 presumably followed up the attack or to participate in one mass bombing run. KG 100 operated between 10 and 13 He 177s. The bombers were believed to have carried four SC1000 Hermanns but apart from several SC500s loaded on to II./KG 54 Ju 88s the other bombers released AB1000 and or AB500 incendiary canisters including phosphorus types. The attack was carried out between 13,000 and 16,000 ft. The German crews abandoned the target-marking methods of Leuchtpfad and Ablauflinie in favour of a simple pattern laid over the target zone. The colour of the flare denoted the area of the target zone. The abandonment of more precise target-identification suggested a German appreciation of the more practical tactic of area bombing. Another change in procedure was the incorrect positioning of any flare patterns. They were to be ignored and following crews were ordered to drop a greater concentration of flares over correctly aligned areas. With this principle applied in sequence, it was hoped crews would not be distracted by faulty target-marking.

The bombers streamed in loose formation between Harwich, Essex and Hythe, Kent. Barely 20 flares exploded over the capital at 21:30 in a scattered manner. They fell along the line of the Thames and Chiswick. Apart from this meagre effort by I./KG 66, most of the 80 bombers identified by British radar reached the capital. The attack started more than 600 fires, caused by a mixture of incendiaries and SC-type bombs ranging from 500 to 1000. Fulham, Putney and Chiswick bore the brunt and most of the 216 fatalities occurred in those boroughs. Had more of the bombers got through, they may have created a firestorm. Aside from the dead, another 417 people were seriously injured.

Kensington was badly damaged, and St Mary Abbots suffered fire damage. Lancaster Gate and Paddington were hit and the Great Western Hotel was severely damaged. Fires broke out in Gloucester Gardens, Porchester Mews, Highgate, Hatton Garden, Clerkenwell and Gloucester Terrace. Fulham alone was subjected to 20,000 incendiary bombs causing, according to one source, 642 fires, 82 of which required the attention of fire services. 76 people were killed in Fulham and 194 were injured. Over 2,500 properties sustained damage or outright destruction. SC1800 Hermann bombs were used over Hammersmith and the damage made 1,200 people homeless. Westminster received four SC500 bombs in the government quarter. One fell on Whitehall damaging the Treasury and killing four people on the corner of 10 Downing Street. Horse Guards Parade, St. James's Park, the Admiralty, the War Office were also damaged and had windows blown out. One of six bombs to hit The Grange at South Mimms, narrowly missed Queen Wilhelmina of the Netherlands' residence but killed two of her staff.

The Luftwaffe lost nine bombers—one to a 25 Squadron Mosquito and two anti-aircraft fire: three from KG 2, four from KG 54, one from KG 66 and KG 6. German propaganda quoted a high figure for participating crews (200), and credited 171 with hitting the target. Before day-break, V./KG 2 sent 21 Me 410s which were supported by 13 SKG 10 Fw 190s. The attackers released incendiaries and SC500 bombs with little effect. One Fw 190 was lost. A second attack was carried out by 11 Fw 190s without effect or loss. 22 German airmen were killed, seven captured and seven wounded. Fighter Command claimed one destroyed, one probably destroyed and two damaged.

==== 22–29 February ====
On 22/23 February 1944, just a few days following the beginning of the American efforts of the "Big Week" strategic bombing campaign, the Luftwaffe organised 185 German bombers to strike at London. KG 6 and 66 carried the burden, with the former putting up 10 extra crews to cover the loss of II./KG 54 which stood down for the evening. All three Gruppen of KG 6 participated. V./KG 2 committed 15 Me 410s. I./KG 100 managed to ready 14 He 177s for the mission. The bomb loads were entirely SC1000 and SC1800 high explosives in the bombers flown by the more experienced crews; the rest were loaded with four SC1000s. At this stage the He 177 Geschwader has shrunk from a Staffel strength of 14 (2./KG 100) and 11 (3./KG 100), although five had been transferred to I./KG 40. The operational strength of the group had fallen to between 12 and 15, barely half of its strength.

The attack affected Hammersmith, Camberwell and Feltham. 230 fires were reported and one at Victoria Docks took time to control. There were 29 casualties from the 81 tons dropped and London and 75 tons on Essex and Kent. RAF Hornchurch was damaged were three personnel injured. The only notable damage was incendiary damage to Harrow School. The Luftwaffe lost 13 aircraft according to German records, although only nine are recorded by the British. Worst hit was KG 2, which lost two Me 410s and a Do 217. 30 German crewman were killed and two captured. Fighter Command claimed six enemy aircraft destroyed, three damaged, and one probably destroyed. It suffered a rare loss when a Mosquito Mk XIII piloted by Wing Commander Mack, commanding 29 Squadron, with Flight Lieutenant Townsin failed to return after a patrol and were posted missing.

Peltz ordered another attack for the 23/24 February, after the perceived concentrated (and successful) attack the previous night. I./KG 6 sent to 10 crews of the 130 (German sources say 161) and were to begin their attack at 22:00. I./KG 66 were ordered to mark the target area with white flares which were set to burst at 10,000 ft above the cloud layer. All the formations except III./KG 6, which was flying from Belgium, were routed via Evreux and Le Havre, north to High Wycombe where four red flares would mark a turn to the south east across London. This time the target codename "Hamburg", which placed the centre of the attack in the vicinity of the Isle of Dogs. The target area suggests that the intention was to inflict economic losses by striking at London's docks. Yellow flares marked the bombing run at 11,000 ft, and the run-in would be conducting at an altitude of 13,000 ft (4,000 m); reduced down to 3,500 ft (1,100 m) once the city was cleared.

German formations from KG 2 and KG 6 carried a mixed ordnance SC500s, AB500s, AB1000s and BC50s for the attack. Colchester was hit badly by 1,400 incendiaries which started a large fire in the town centre. 15 properties were destroyed and 99 damaged. 75 fire-engines and two million gallons were needed to extinguish the flames. There was only one casualty in the town and no fatalities.

A total of 185 sorties were flown. Five bombers were lost; one to ground fire and another to a 605 Squadron Mosquito. Amongst the losses this night was Do 217M-1, code U5+DK, Werknummer 56051. At 10,000 ft over London the aircraft was hit by predictive fire from the ground. Pilot Oberfeldwebel Hermann Stemann ordered the crew to abandon the aircraft over Wembley and they were promptly captured. The bomber flew on for 60 miles making a near-perfect forced landing north of Cambridge. The intact bomber enabled British intelligence to examine both it, the FuG 214 tail-warning radar and the ordnance on board. Personnel losses amounted to none killed or missing, four wounded and six captured. Fighter Command claimed one destroyed one probably destroyed this night.

The target of the Luftwaffe on 24/25 February was the Westminster area, in particular the government quarter. I./KG 66 was ordered to aid the bomber stream by dropping white flares timed to ignite at 10,000 ft. British intelligence estimated 135 bombers took part in the operation though German records say exactly 170 crews participated. Some German crews had been trained in new bombing techniques. A small number of bomb-aimers were to use their Lotfernrohr 7 bombsights on individual flares to increase the accuracy of the attack. The attack followed the typical pattern; a northerly course, and a turn to the south east at High Wycombe across London and out across the eastern Channel. Pilots were ordered to reach the coast at 16,000 ft and descend to 13,000 ft over the target.

Most of the 100 tons of bombs fell on London, starting around 250 fires and killing 75 people. Most casualties occurred in the borough of Lambeth. Over 2,000 incendiaries fell on Acton Green where 100 houses were damaged. In Acton and Bedford Park 26 people were killed and another 22 civilians died in Balham. Kew Bridge was damaged and 20 homes destroyed in Southgate. There were also many fires in the Camden Town area of London. Railways were damaged and severe restrictions were placed on freight movements in the following days. Bombs just missed the SHAEF (Supreme Headquarters Allied Expeditionary Force) headquarters in Bushy Park and damaged Teddington. Bombs also fell near the home of Admiral Sir Bertram Ramsay.

The Mosquitos of Fighter Command exacted a toll of German crews this night. Nine German bombers were lost, five were shot down by No. 29 Squadron RAF and one to 488 Squadron. A sixth fell to a night fighter but the squadron responsible cannot be identified. Total Fighter Command claims amounted to six destroyed three probably destroyed and four damaged. KG 2 lost four bombers, KG 66 lost two more, KG 6, KG 54 and KG 100 lost a single bomber each. 14 German airmen were captured, 17 killed, one injured and five missing.

In contrast, the "Big Week" campaign's RAF contribution sent some 700 bombers to Schweinfurt on the same night as the Luftwaffe's Westminster-area raid, while the final American large strategic daytime raid of "Big Week" occurred on the 25th, with some 700 four-engined American "heavies" hitting daylight targets in Germany.

There would be no attack for several days, after the American daytime and RAF nocturnal attacks of the Allies' "Big Week" campaign, but Steinbock suffered a blow on 29 February when Gruppenkommandeur, I./KG 66, Major Helmut Fuhrhop was shot down and killed by RAF Hawker Typhoons from No. 609 Squadron RAF while on a transfer flight from Paris to Dreux in Ju 188 3E+KH, belonging to 1. Staffel. All aboard were killed including his two boxer dogs; Oberfeldwebel Alfred Schubert, Alfons Eichschmidt, Walter Rehfeldt, Wilhelm Schachtshabel and Arnold Büttner.

=== March ===
==== 1–15 March ====
On 2/3 March 1944 Peltz ordered another attack. The year's operations had taken their toll and the bomber groups struggled to make many aircraft airworthy. German propaganda claimed 164 crews took part and 131 hit their designated target area. In reality, it was more likely that 70 crews took off against England.

KG 100 was able to get 2. and 3. Staffeln from I. Gruppe into action with their He 177. These units could field only 15 of the heavy bombers for the night's mission. Most, if not all of the He 177s were loaded with four SC1000s. The formation proceeded to Cherbourg, where the funkfeuer acted as a rallying point for a turn north to Watford, and from that way point, south east to London. The target was Victoria Station and the surrounding area, which were marked by red flares. Assisting the bomber crews on the night were three Knickebein and Sonne stations. They were also afforded lux buoys dropped in the Channel.

The use of Knickebein at this point was questioned by crews. The British had developed countermeasures to jam and disrupt the signal since 1940. Crews were also suspicious of it. Some of the more experienced pilots believed the system was compromised and that the signals allowed RAF night fighters to home in on their position. This belief was pervasive at this time but post-war analysis shows this to be a myth. Navigators preferred to abandon cooperation with the Knickebein stations and proceed to the target by dead reckoning. German airmen were helped to identify the London area by large concentrations of searchlights and anti-aircraft fire.

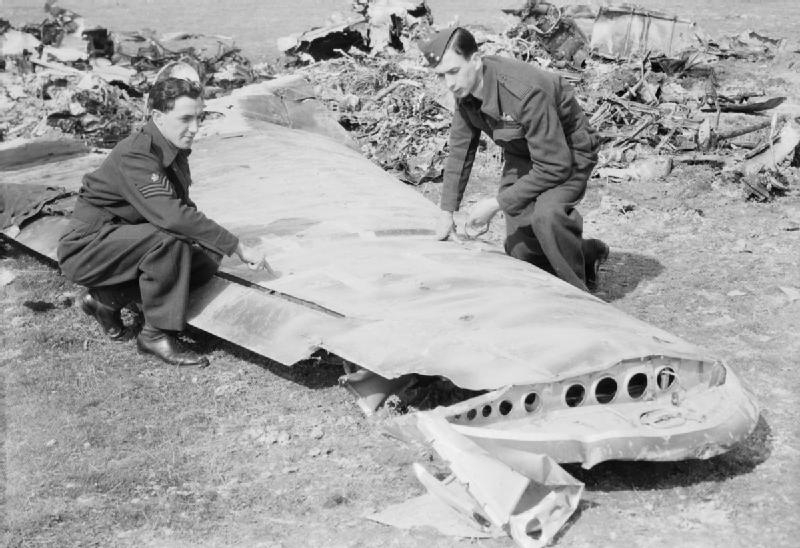
Pilot Officer J Allen (right) and Flight Sergeant W Patterson, 96 Squadron, survey the wreckage of a Ju 88A-4. It belonged to 6. Staffel of KG 6. The machine was code 3E+BP Werknummer 2537. Unteroffizier Helmut Barbauer and Friedrich Schork were taken prisoner. Hugo Muhlbauer and Fritz Gotze were killed.

In the night's operation, the Luftwaffe reported the loss of eight aircraft. Among the losses was one He 177 from 2./KG 100, two Ju 188s and a Ju 88 from KG 2 while KG 54 and KG 6 lost one Ju 88 each. Also worthy of note was the loss of one Ju 88 from KG 101, which participated in the night's bombing. Fighter Command claimed four destroyed and three damaged. The seven claims emanated from 456 (one damaged), 605 (three claims; two damaged and one destroyed) and 151 Squadron (three destroyed).

The heavy bombs caused significant damage considering the size of the German force. 900 houses were damaged and 500 people were made homeless. The Royal Arsenal Co-operative Society building in Woolwich and the Siemens works were hit by 700 incendiaries. The City and Guilds of London Art School was badly damaged by incendiary bombs. A string of other areas were hit: Biggin Hill, Welling, Sidcup, Norwood, Catford, Lewisham and Sanderstead. RAF Kidbrooke was struck by bombs which struck and destroyed several hangars. In Rochester 20 homes were destroyed and 100 damaged. Around 300 people were made homeless in the worst attack on the town during the war.

The following days marked a reduction in the scale of operations, but missions were still flown to maintain what pressure the Luftwaffe could. From 4 to 7 March one Me 410, He 177, Ju 88 and Fw 190 were lost: the last three to enemy action.

==== 14/15 March ====
On the night of the 14/15 March 1944 bomber crews were briefed to attack London again. This time the target was Whitehall with Buckingham Palace being marked out as a special target. The bombers were ordered to form up over the North Sea, north west of Rotterdam at 16,400 ft (5,000 m). The attacking force was to cross the coast at Leiston and turn south using Cambridge as a waypoint. Once the bombs had been dropped the pilots were ordered to leave England at Beachy Head. For the first time, the Luftwaffe attempted a diversion during Steinbock. Until this operation, deception was limited to the wholesale use of Düppel. Peltz ordered the Fw 190s of SKG 10 to fly a diversion sortie over Plymouth fifteen minutes ahead of the planned attack. Fw 190 pilots carried flares to encourage the British to think that the port town was the primary target.

The operation was poorly executed; bomber units were prompt in taking off and the fighters were late. By the time the Fw 190s were approaching Plymouth the first of the bombers were over the English coast in the north east. The mass use of Düppel was not effective because of the large number of British radar units in service. It was quickly determined that the main attack was occurring in the north. British radar operators were suspicious of the small number and high speed of the southern intruders, which alerted them to its diversionary function.

The bombers reached the target and dropped their bombs but little damage was done. In the Belgravia district, some damage was done by exploding high explosives. One notable casualty was Muriel Wright, the girlfriend of Ian Fleming the future novelist, who at that time was serving as a naval intelligence officer. A bomb fell through the roof of her apartment and killed her. She was the only casualty in Westminster. Around 162 tons of bombs were dropped on London. 54 boroughs reported 390 fires. Paddington, Westminster, Marylebone, St Pancras and Bloomsbury were damaged. Bombs also fell in Hyde Park. In Drayton Park, Highbury, in the borough of Islington, 26 people were killed, more than half the night's total fatalities. Two bombs damaged 100 houses in Worthing while there were reports of strafing from German aircraft with incendiary rounds which burnt out a furniture depository.

The Luftwaffe lost 19 aircraft. KG 2 lost three bombers, KG 6 lost two while KG 30 lost six. KG 54 lost one bomber while KG 51 lost two Me 410s. SKG 10 suffered the loss of three Fw 190s. Six are known to have been shot down by Mosquitos and another by ground fire. Four further claims of German aircraft destroyed, plus one probable, were made which cannot be attributed to a particular loss. 33 German airmen were posted as killed in action on the operation, 13 were listed as missing while six were captured.

==== Steinbock turns to Hull ====
Peltz turned his attention to Northern England for the 19/20 March operation. Hull became the focus for Steinbock this night. The port city was a commercial seaport on the eastern seaboard. It had been heavily bombed in 1941 after suffering little in the 1939 to 1940 period. The city had seen sporadic attacks in 1942 and 1943. The location of the sea hub near the mouth of the Humber provided a sound geographical reference point for aviators, but German crews faced the prospect of a long, arduous journey over the featureless North Sea.

Peltz committed II./KG 30 to the attack but omitted its sister group from the night's mission because of losses sustained in the previous attack. Only I./KG 6 was committed from that Geschwader. Eight Kampfgeschwader took part in the Hull raid. I. and II./KG 2 and I./KG 100 flew out at three separate points approximately 40 miles apart between Noordwijk, IJmuiden and Petten. The altitude varied. Some units were ordered to begin climbing when they had reached the assembly point at 53.32°N 02.35°E. To assist the bomber stream, two Knickebein beams were used and 29 lux buoys were dropped into the sea; the lead formations used red sky markers for marking waypoints.

All the Gruppen took a direct path to Grimsby from the assembly point and made a right turn north west up the estuary. The only exception was I./KG 100. They were instructed to head further north, between Spurn Head and Withernsea. In addition the He 177s then navigated back to the assembly point before returning to the Rheine. II./KG 2 supplemented I./KG 66 dropping a mixture of flares, AB1000 and AB500 containers over target area to assist in navigation.

RAF controllers detected activity when a radar set at Orby picked up the use of düppel being dropped 90 miles east of Skegness. The düppel screen was 70 miles long and 50 miles wide and eventually penetrated 10 to 12 miles (16 to 19 kilometres) inland. The weather was clear with clouds between 2,500 and 3,500 ft (760 and 1,070 m). Most of the flares were dropped well to the south, possibly due to incorrect assessments of wind strengths. Most of the HE bombs and 40,000 incendiaries were reported to fall in rural Louth and Spilsby.

The 131 bombers made landfall over north Lincolnshire, well to the south of Hull. KG 54 crews reported reaching the Humber Estuary before sighting powerful white flares to the south. Some crews treated these as British decoys or pathfinder flares endeavouring to identify the target. Several other units dropped their bombs on the target markers. Some crews reported claimed to have flown to the north of Hull and made a bombing run south across the city without marker assistance and only noticed targeting flares when the bomb run was complete. These reports were likely inaccurate. Nevertheless, 103 of the German crews claimed to have crossed the English coast, double the number recorded by the British. There was no damage in Hull and no human casualties. The population was unaware they were the target of an enemy air attack.

Nine German bombers failed to return. Two are confirmed to have been shot down by Mosquitos from 307 and 264 Squadrons—which accounted for a He 177 from 2./KG 100 flown by Hauptmann Heinrich Müller and the Do 217 of 2./KG 2 flown by Unteroffizier Hans Jakob respectively. Neither crew survived. Humber anti-aircraft batteries accounted for Hauptmann Walter Schmitt's Ju 188. The 2./KG 66 aircraft crashed north of the Humber Light Ship and all aboard were killed. Detailed loss records show that once again, KG 30 suffered disproportionally, losing four: KG 2 suffered two losses and KG 54 lost one Ju 88. A further seven claims were made by Fighter Command aside from the credited victories to 307 and 264 pilots Pilot Officer J Brochocki Flying Officer R. L. J. Barbour.

German serviceability rates began to drop since the high figures of January. 2 and 3./KG 2 could field only nine Do 217s between them and seven were ready for operations. II./KG 2 could still field 19 Ju 188s with 12 airworthy and III./KG 2 could commit 18 of the 16 on strength. KG 6 could field 14 of 11 Ju 188s and 27 of 40 Ju 88s; KG 30 31 of 41 Ju 88s; KG 40 12 of 28 He 177s and 8 of 53 Focke-Wulf Fw 200s; KG 51, 7 of 26 Me 410s; KG 54, 26 of 39 Ju 88 and Ju 188s; I./KG 66 12 aircraft from 26, and KG 100 could field 64 from 48 bombers. I./SKG 10 had 32 Fw 190s available but only 12 were combat ready. To this list was added I./KG 26 with 16 Heinkel He 111s and III./KG 26 with 20 of 27 Ju 88s available.

==== Return to London ====
Steinbock operational records show that 144 aircraft were available to attack London on 21/22 March. 123 were credited with having flown sorties on the night. British intelligence suggests that only 95 crossed the coast into England. The diminishing numbers of bombers available was only a part of Peltz' problem. The campaign was having little to zero effect on the Allied war effort nor upon civilian morale. The Luftwaffe effort was not even yielding short-term gains.

I., II. and III./KG 30 were mustered for operations and fielded 40 crews despite previous losses. They were briefed that the Isle of Dogs in the East End was to be the focus of their attack. As before, pathfinders from KG 66 were made available to mark the target. Searchlights and lux buoys were also provided for navigation. Knickebein stations were on hand to assist with navigation for KG 30 at least. The crews were briefed to operate at 14,500 ft (4,400 m) crossing at Beachy Head. III./KG 30 were allowed a choice of four airfields to return to, spread evenly between Melsbroek and Brétigny. II. Gruppe were to land at Orly.

The Luftwaffe effort was spread over a large area dissipating the effect. Hammersmith to Orpington extending to Lambeth and Croydon were particularly affected. In Croydon, South Norwood was struck by 20 SC-type bombs which caused huge damage and killed 14 of the 61 or 62 civilians killed that night. Observers reported the larger blast effect of these bombs which perhaps is an indicator they contained new mixtures. 247 fires were recorded with major incidents in Islington and Dagenham. Paddington station sustained a direct hit and was severely damaged. With the 61/62 fatalities, 250 civilians were seriously injured.

The Luftwaffe lost 10 bombers on the night. Of all the airmen to be lost, only six ended up as prisoners and another was injured when crash-landing in France; 40 were posted missing or killed. KG 6 and KG 54 lost three bombers each, KG 30 lost two and KG 51 and KG 66 lost one aircraft each—an Me 410 and Ju 88S-1 respectively. Fighter Command claimed five destroyed and four damaged this night: two for 25 Squadron, one for 456 Squadron, and another two for 488 Squadron. 85 Squadron claimed two damaged and 96 Squadron Mosquito claimed a solitary Fw 190 damaged. A Mosquito night fighter also shot down a He 177 from 3./KG 100 over the Rheine that night with all nine men on board killed.

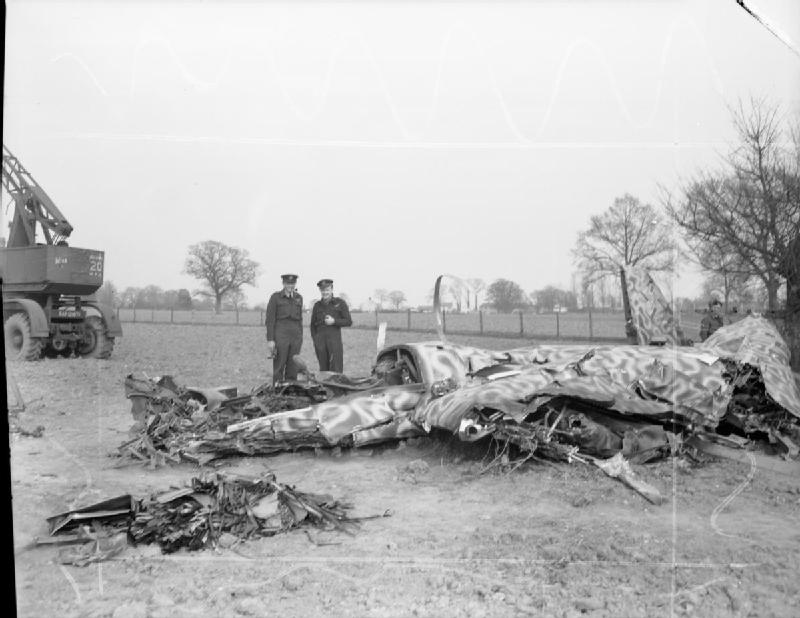
Wing Commander Keith Hampshire, 456 Squadron RAAF (left), and radar operator T Condon, survey the Ju 88 they shot down on 27/28 March 1944.

On the next nights the Luftwaffe resorted to hit-and-run tactics using jabos. From 22 to 24 March three Fw 190s were lost with their pilots from SKG 10 and a solitary Ju 88 from I./KG 66 with the loss of one crew member. One Fw 190 and the Ju 88 fell to night fighters.

The Luftwaffe commenced the 24/24 March operation in the same manner as the other massed raids. The bomber groups were aided by searchlights and star shells at the coast to enable them to form into a stream. In this case, possibly adjusted for weather conditions, the formations would reach a maximum altitude of 16,000 ft (4,900 m) before descending to 15,000 ft for the bomb run. Once completed a descent of 2,000 ft (610 m) was ordered to enable them to build up speed and escape the target area. The codename given to the 143 participating crews was Hamburg—the codename for Whitehall.

Once over England searchlights and anti-aircraft fire were observed to be heavy. The guns were backed by a concentrated effort from searchlight beams that swept the sky looking to catch a German aircraft. Over Croydon, a period of 20 minutes elapsed between the air raid siren sounding and the beginning of the barrage. The attack seemed to be aimed at South Croydon and East Croydon. Thornton Heath also attracted a deluge of heavy bombs and incendiaries. West Norwood was also badly damaged. The latter two regions were sent 28 and 70 fire engines to deal with large conflagrations. The bombing also destroyed a public shelter.

In the city of London the landmark St Dunstan-in-the-West church was damaged by fire. Fleet Street, Essex Street, Fetter Lane, Temple and Middle Temple Hall were damaged by bombs. 56 fire engines were required in this location of the city alone. In Beckenham, 60 fires were counted. The fires were so serious that only a firezone was maintained to contain it. Coulsdon and Purley took 6,000 incendiary hits and 2–3,000 fell on Croydon causing over 80 fires. In Shirley, a direct hit on a Home Guard armoury set an entire street ablaze. Total civilian casualties amounted to 20 dead—16 deaths occurring in Croydon. 78 more were injured.

The Germans lost 17 aircraft this night on operations and a further three on non-operational flights; two from KG 6 and one from KG 30. Of the operational casualties four are known to have been caused by ground-fire and a further two were shot down by night fighters—Wing Commander Keith Hampshire (CO of 456 Sqn RAAF) shot down a 6./KG 6 Ju 88 and Flying Officer E. Hedgecoe accounted for a Ju 88S-1 from 1./KG 66. Three were lost due to engine fires, technical issues or fuel starvation. The fate of the remaining 10 are unknown for certain. German aircrew losses amounted to 21 killed, three wounded, 25 missing and five captured.

Fighter Command night fighters made three additional claims which cannot be matched to a particular loss. Successful night fighter pilot Flight lieutenant Branse Burbridge, of 85 Squadron filed two claims for an enemy destroyed and one probably destroyed on this raid.

==== Attack on Bristol ====
Operations against London were suspended for the night of 27/28 March. Despite the failure of the Hull attack, another alternative target was selected by Peltz: Bristol. The city had a large seaport at Avonmouth which made it an important entry point for materials and supplies shipped from the United States. The port had become a staging area for equipment in the build-up to Operation Overlord and a large portion of the United States Army forces in England were based there. In addition, aircraft arriving at Avonmouth were transported to nearby Filton airfield where Cosmoline, applied for protection during the long sea voyage, had to be removed before they could be flown for D-Day support. Bristol was specifically chosen with this in mind and Steinbock intended to hinder Allied activities.

The participating groups were dispatched to airfields in north western France. Guernsey was chosen as the rendezvous point for the bomber force and it was marked by a cone of six searchlights. A north west route was maintained and landfall was ordered to be made at Lyme Bay. Over the River Usk, flares were to signal a 90-degree turn to Chepstow, where crews would proceed on a southerly route to Bristol. The bomb run varied according to the unit briefing but was intended to take place in an 11–14,500 ft bracket. I./KG 66 marked the target with flares. Four crews from II./KG 2 assisted these operations by hovering around the target and releasing fresh flares during the attack to keep the target area highlighted, should the initial flares burn out.

Two Knickebein stations were available. One of the beams ran south of Bristol the other intersected it at a point between Shepton Mallet and Bath. The plan was sound, but replacement aircraft, in particular the Ju 88s, were not fitted with the Lorenz blind approach equipment. Only bombers with FuBL could detect the beams. Additionally, the range of the Knickebein frequencies meant they could only by picked up on FuBL 2 sets, although it was possible to find the second station's frequency with the original FuBL sets of older aircraft. Added to this limitation was added the attitude of the crews. German airmen maintained their mistrust in the efficiency of Knickebein when pitted against British jamming measures and were inclined to rely upon visual assistance.

Target–marking was poor. Of the 139 bombers dispatched 116 got through the defences and six more bombed alternate targets while 16 aborted the sortie. However, not a single bomb landed on the city and the populace remained oblivious to the attack. British intelligence remained ignorant as to the objective of the attack until German radio announced the city of Bristol had been devastated in a bombing raid. The failure of I./KG 66 to mark the target was major contributing factor in the debacle. Most of the bombs fell across Somerset and several hundred unexploded bombs were reported. These sites caused disruption to road traffic as the devices were found and the area was not fully cleared until the end of the year.

The Luftwaffe groups reported the loss of 14 aircraft and one damaged. Four belonged to KG 54 and four to KG 6. kg 2, KG 30 and KG 66 lost two aircraft each. Six were known to have been shot down by an assortment of Beaufighter and Mosquito night fighters. 68, 456, 406 and 219 Squadron pilots were credited with enemy aircraft this night. Two bombers were shot down by ground fire, the remainder failed to return for unknown reasons. Fighter Command made three further claims not attributable to a particular loss. A further claim was made by an anti-aircraft battery at Portland. German casualties amounted to 13 killed, one wounded, 16 missing and 19 captured. Wing Commander Keith Hampshire, commanding 456 Squadron RAAF accounted for two enemy aircraft this night—he achieved three successes during Steinbock.

=== April ===
==== 5–26 April ====
German air groups flew few sorties in the first few days of April but sustained a small number losses on non-operational flights. On 12/13 April 1944 an Me 410 from 3./KG 51 was shot down by Squadron Leader A. Parker or Flight Lieutenant Derek Harland Ward of No. 96 Squadron RAF and a handful of losses were incurred by friendly fire and in accidents.

On 18/19 April the Luftwaffe prepared an attack on London using the same approach as the Bristol operation. I./KG 6 and II./KG 2 marked the target area from 8 and 6,000 ft respectively. The bomber stream was ordered to converge on the Funkfeuer at Noordwijk on the Dutch coast. Landfall was marked at Leiston and six Lux buoys were dropped en route to mark the bomber's path. A turning point was ordered at Newmarket. The bomb run was to take place at 10,000 ft (3,000 m) with a gradual descent to Dymchurch and over to Boulogne. Two Knickebein stations at Den Helder and Bergen supported the operations. The Caen, Cherbourg and Morlaix stations were also in use for this operation as the Luftwaffe made greater attempts to improve navigation.

Adequate conditions prevailed but only 53 of the 125 crews crossed the English coast, although most of those did get through to London. The poor showing was probably a result of flares not being released over London or at Newmarket. The raid cost the Luftwaffe 17 bombers—KG 2 lost four bombers (three Ju 188s and a Do 217), KG 6 lost four Ju 88s, KG 54 lost four Ju 88s, KG 51 lost three Me 410s, KG 30, KG 66 and KG 100 each lost an aircraft. Seven bombers were shot down by Mosquitos from 25 (two), 85, 96 (two), 456 and 410 Squadron. A further aircraft was shot down by ground fire. The fate of the remaining nine is unknown. Fighter Command made an additional seven claims that cannot be attributed to a particular loss. A notable success was recorded by Wing Commander Edward Crew who accounted for a Me 410 of 1. Staffel of KG 51. Branse Burbridge of 85 Squadron also brought down an enemy aircraft.

On the night of 23/24 April 1944 Peltz once again targeted Bristol after the previous raid's farcical execution. The Luftwaffe was able to ready 117 bombers for the second operation. II./KG 30 sent all of its three Staffeln to Orly for the attack, but once there, one-third of the aircrews were left behind. The unit was able to maintain its complement of crews at 30, but previous losses meant the number of experienced crews had declined and novice crews were now populating the Staffel. This problem was not uncommon on the Steinbock units. Peltz ordered at least three Knickebein stations to assist the bombers. The bomber stream was assigned an altitude of 16,000 ft (4,900 m) and was to bomb at that level.

As the raid progressed it became clear that the debacle of the first raid was repeating itself. Bristol was not hit. Instead, British radar noted that as the German wave approached the coast, 35 of the German raiders dropped their loads over or next to Poole or Bournemouth. The Luftwaffe suffered the loss of 13 aircraft; KG 2 lost three, KG 6 one, KG 30 three, KG 54 five and KGr 101 lost a single machine. German personnel losses were 33 missing, 12 killed and three captured. Two were certainly shot down by night fighters and one to ground-fire. The fate of the remaining 10 are unknown, however Fighter Command pilots claimed another four which cannot be attributed to a particular loss. 125 Squadron made six claims this night. Wing Commander Hampshire of 456 made another claim as did a No. 406 Squadron RCAF Beaufighter.

By April 1944 the preparations for Overlord were well underway. The Luftwaffe had not been able to observe and counter the Allied buildup. RAF Fighter Command masked the invasion ports from the German reconnaissance units by day. The Germans resorted to using 1./Aufklärungsgruppe 121 (Long Range Reconnaissance Group 121), equipped with Me 410s, to fly from bases near Paris and observe the results of raids by night. These operations failed. Nevertheless, 1./Aufklärungsgruppe 122 (Long Range Reconnaissance Group 121) was ordered to support and record the damage of four consecutive night raids on Portsmouth which began on 25/26 April. The raids also failed, even against a coastal target which was easier to find. The reconnaissance groups lost two Me 410s—one of which fell to Branse Burbridge from 85 Squadron. Other losses were an Fw 190G-3 from 3./SKG 10, two Ju 88s from KG 2, a Ju 88 from the pathfinder I./KG 66 unit, a He 177 from 3./KG 100 plus two Me 410s from 1(F)/121. Fighter Command claimed four further victories — three by 456 Squadron and one from 125 Squadron.

The following night, 26/27 April, seven German aircraft were lost, four claims being made by Fighter Command. For the night of 29/30 April, the Luftwaffe aimed to attack shipping in the harbour. German intelligence had received information confirming the presence in Plymouth of a King George V-class battleship and the ship was to become the focus of the attack. III./KG 100 was ordered from Toulouse to participate. The Do 217K-2s were armed with Fritz X gravity PGM bombs. KG 66 would illuminate the target area and crews were assigned to carry out the bomb-run along the length of the ship. They were not to drop their bombs if they could not locate a target. The formations used a Knickebein station and a Funkfeuer at Rennes for navigation. Heavy mist, a smoke screen and the failure of KG 66 to light the target on time contributed to the failure. 27 civilians were killed in the attack. The attack was costly for KG 100. Gruppenkommandeur (Group Commander) Hauptmann Herbert Pfeffer was killed with his crew after being shot down by Squadron Leader D. J. Williams of 406 Squadron, the latter's second victory that night.

=== May ===
From the 3 to 12 May the air offensive came to a halt with the exception of a few sporadic attacks. The Home Office published "Weekly Appreciation of Damage to Key Points and Progress of Repairs". It concluded that only one serious injury was recorded and no serious damage to the war effort. The small raids cost the Germans five aircraft, two from KG 54 one from KG 100 and another from KG 51. From 10 to 17 May another report shows that around 80 aircraft were tracked over Britain. It concluded that no appreciable damage was done. It recorded 23 casualties; three serious.

In a practical sense Steinbock was over by the end of April 1944. The number of bombers and selected targets had structurally declined. For the first two weeks of May the offensive wound down. The German bomber groups recuperated and were readied for a renewed assault. For example, KG 2 moved III. Gruppe to Lorient, but it had only one Staffel (7) available as an Allied attack on the base at Achmer depleted it.

The Germans had learned from previous errors. Incendiary bombs were discarded in favour of high explosives. Crews were ordered to ignore the fires on the ground as decoys. Bristol was chosen on the night of the 14/15 May as the target. It had thus far, escaped major damage. The pathfinder group I./KG 6 were told, with KG 2, KG 30, KG 66 and KG 100 would muster 150 aircraft for the operation. Guernsey would be the turning point, marked by four searchlights. The return flight would take them to Cap la Hague, then Brétigny.

The Knickebein proved irrelevant and again, to Luftwaffe crews, Bristol confirmed its "bogey" reputation. Only one-third of the crews were tracked by British radar. A few bombs struck Portsmouth and Southampton. Most crews did not find the target. Eleven bombers were lost, four crashing on land. Four fell to RAF night fighters.

== Aftermath ==
Although the 'Baby Blitz' attacks had involved more Luftwaffe aircraft than any other raids on the UK since 1941, the effectiveness of air and ground defences, the relative inexperience of the German bomber crews, and the sheer lack of bomber numbers meant relatively minor damage and few casualties were inflicted. The initial bomber strength was built up at great expense from the operational requirements of the Luftwaffe. Most bombs failed to reach their targets, and those that did represented only a fraction of what was hitting Germany. The choice to not target the assembly areas for Operation Overlord meant that there was no significant impact on the allied time table for the invasion. The raids were ironically to prove more costly for German capabilities than for the British, draining the Luftwaffe of irreplaceable aircrew and modern aircraft and thus reducing the potential air response to Operation Overlord. After the failure of this conventional bombing campaign, the Nazi leadership sought unconventional ways to attack Britain. This desire was to manifest itself in the V-1 cruise missile and V-2 short-range ballistic missile campaigns later that year.

German losses:
270 Junkers Ju 88s
121 Dornier Do 217s
35 Junkers Ju 188s
46 Heinkel He 177As
27 Messerschmitt Me 410s
25 Focke-Wulf Fw 190s

British losses:
7 to unknown causes
1 destroyed by enemy action
5 damaged by enemy action
1 destroyed by friendly fire
14 lost on intruder operations January–May 1944
Civilian casualties:
1,556 killed
