= Karl-Heinz Langer =

German World War II fighter pilot (1914–1955)

- Born: 19 April 1914; Görlitz, German Empire
- Died: 6 May 1955 (aged 41); Remscheid, West Germany
- Military career
- Allegiance: Nazi Germany
- Branch: Luftwaffe
- Rank: Major (major)
- Unit: JG 3
- Commands: III./JG 3
- Conflicts: World War II: Eastern Front; Defense of the Reich; Operation Bodenplatte
- Awards: Knight's Cross of the Iron Cross

Karl-Heinz Langer (19 April 1914 – 6 May 1955) was a Luftwaffe ace and recipient of the Knight's Cross of the Iron Cross during World War II. The Knight's Cross of the Iron Cross, and its variants were the highest awards in the military and paramilitary forces of Nazi Germany during World War II. During his career he was credited with 30 aerial victories in 486 missions, 10 on the Western Front and 20 on the Eastern Front.

== Career ==
=== War against the Soviet Union ===
The Gruppe relocated to an airfield at Moderówka on 18 June where the Gruppe concluded their last preparations for Operation Barbarossa, the German invasion of the Soviet Union on 22 June 1941. At the start of the campaign, JG 3 was subordinated to the V. Fliegerkorps (5th Air Corps), under command of General der Flieger Robert Ritter von Greim, which was part of Luftflotte 4 (4th Air Fleet), under command of Generaloberst Alexander Löhr. These air elements supported Generalfeldmarschall Gerd von Rundstedt's Heeresgruppe Süd (Army Group South), with the objective of capturing Ukraine and its capital Kiev.

In December 1942, III. Gruppe's primary task was providing fighter escort to Junkers Ju 52 transport aircraft and Heinkel He 111 bombers shuttling supplies for the encircled German forces fighting in the Battle of Stalingrad. On 17 December, Langer and the Geschwaderkommodore (wing commander) of JG 3, Major Wolf-Dietrich Wilcke, escorted 16 Ju 52 transport aircraft to the Pitomnik Airfield which was located within the Stalingrad pocket. While taking off at Pitomnik Airfield, his Messerschmitt Bf 109 G-2 (Werknummer 13739—factory number) ran over unexploded ordnance which then exploded, destroying his aircraft and significantly injuring Langer. He was later flown out of the pocket on a Ju 52.

=== Squadron leader ===
Langer was appointed Staffelkapitän (squadron leader) of 7. Staffel (7th squadron) of Jagdgeschwader 3 (JG 3—3rd Fighter Wing) on 1 June 1943. He succeeded Oberleutnant Eberhard von Boremski who was wounded in combat the day before.

On 14 July 1943 during the Battle of Kursk, Langer was temporarily given command of III. Gruppe (3rd group) of JG 3 after its former commander Hauptmann Wolfgang Ewald was shot down behind enemy lines and taken prisoner of war. In consequence, command of 7. Staffel was briefly given to Leutnant Hans Schleef. When on 20 July, Hauptmann Walther Dahl took command of the Gruppe, Langer returned to his 7. Staffel.

III. Gruppe flew its last combat missions on the Eastern Front on 1 August 1943. The next day, the Gruppe was ordered to Chasiv Yar and then back to Germany where it was based at Münster-Handorf Airfield.

=== Defense of the Reich ===
III. Gruppe arrived in Münster-Handorf on 3 August where Dahl took over command of the unit. The Gruppe immediately began preparations for Defense of the Reich (Reichsverteidigung) missions and was subordinated to Fighter Leader for the Holland area (Jagdfliegerführer Holland).

On 14 October, during the Second Raid on Schweinfurt, Langer claimed the destruction of Boeing B-17 Flying Fortress bomber shot down 8 kilometers (5.0 miles) east of Hammelburg. In this engagement, his Bf 109 G-6 (Werknummer 26924) was shot down by defensive fire. Langer was forced to bail out near Hammelburg. Due to the injuries sustained, he was replaced by Leutnant Erwin Stahlberg as leader of 7. Staffel. Following his convalescence, Langer served with Ergänzungs-Jagdgruppe Ost, a fighter pilot training unit.

On 21 May 1944, Langer was appointed Gruppenkommandeur (group commander) of III. Gruppe of JG 3 based at Ansbach Airfield. He thus succeeded Dahl who was transferred. On 27 May, the United States Army Air Forces (USAAF) Eighth Air Force sent 1,126 heavy bombers, escorted by 1,135 fighter aircraft, to railroad infrastructure and Luftwaffe airfields in southwest Germany and northeast France. III. Gruppe led by Langer were scrambled at 11:26 and vectored to Karlsruhe where they began their pursuit of an escorted B-17 bomber formation heading for Strasbourg. III. Gruppe attacked the bombers south of Strasbourg and before the escorting fighters broke off the attack, III. Gruppe claimed two B-17 bombers shot down, including one by Langer. The claim filed by Langer was in fact an Herausschuss (separation shot)—a severely damaged heavy bomber forced to separate from its combat box which was counted as an aerial victory. In this engagement, III. Gruppe lost six fighters to the escorting USAAF fighters.

On 20 April 1945, Langer was awarded the Knight's Cross of the Iron Cross (Ritterkreuz des Eisernen Kreuzes).

== Later life ==
Langer died on 6 May 1955 at the age of 41 in Fischbach, West Germany.

== Summary of career ==
=== Aerial victory claims ===
Langer was credited with 30 aerial victories claimed in 486 combat missions. Mathews and Foreman, authors of Luftwaffe Aces — Biographies and Victory Claims, researched the German Federal Archives and found documentation for 29 aerial victory claims, plus one further unconfirmed claim. This number includes ten on the Western Front, including four four-engined bombers, and 19 on the Eastern Front.

Victory claims were logged to a map-reference (PQ = Planquadrat), for example "PQ 4056". The Luftwaffe grid map (Jägermeldenetz) covered all of Europe, western Russia and North Africa and was composed of rectangles measuring 15 minutes of latitude by 30 minutes of longitude, an area of about 360 square miles (930 km^{2}). These sectors were then subdivided into 36 smaller units to give a location area 3 km × 4 km (1.9 mi × 2.5 mi) in size.

Chronicle of aerial victories
This along with the * (asterisk) indicates an Herausschuss (separation shot)—a severely damaged heavy bomber forced to separate from his combat box which was counted as an aerial victory. This and the ? (question mark) indicates information discrepancies listed by Prien, Stemmer, Rodeike, Bock, Mathews and Foreman.
| Claim | Date | Time | Type | Location | Claim | Date | Time | Type | Location |
– 7. Staffel of Jagdgeschwader 3 – Operation Barbarossa — 22 June – 6 November 1941
| 1 | 14 July 1941 | 07:10 | I-153 | | 2 | 5 October 1941 | 14:55 | DB-3 | |
– 7. Staffel of Jagdgeschwader 3 "Udet" – Eastern Front – 10 February 1942 – 14 April 1942
| 3 | 9 March 1942 | 11:08 | I-61 (MiG-3) | 12 km (7.5 mi) southwest of Salustsche | 4 | 18 March 1942 | 10:15 | Pe-2 | |
– Stab III. Gruppe of Jagdgeschwader 3 "Udet" – Eastern Front – 19 May 1942 – 3 February 1943
| 5 | 24 August 1942 | 13:50 | R-5 | Zarjew | 9 | 17 October 1942 | 06:23 | Il-2 | PQ 4056, west of Rulew |
| 6 | 24 August 1942 | 13:56 | MiG-1 | east of Leninsk | 10 | 26 October 1942 | 14:15 | Il-2 | PQ 49357, Bassargino railway station |
| 7 | 3 September 1942 | 15:53 | LaGG-3 | Akelin | 11 | 28 December 1942 | — | Yak-1 | Stalingrad |
| 8 | 1 October 1942 | 06:57 | LaGG-3 | PQ 40793, northeast Gratschi vicinity of Spartak | | | | | |
– 7. Staffel of Jagdgeschwader 3 "Udet" – Eastern Front – 1 June – 1 August 1943
| 12 | 5 July 1943 | 11:16 | La-5 | southeast of Kobenaja southeast of Rakitnoye | 14 | 21 July 1943 | 09:45 | Il-2 | 14 km (8.7 mi) northeast of Dworeznaja; 9 km (5.6 mi) northwest of Bogoroditskoye |
| 13 | 7 July 1943 | 04:07 | Il-5 | northwest of Vovchansk | 15 | 31 July 1943 | 11:15 | Il-2 | Kuybyshevo |
– 7. Staffel of Jagdgeschwader 3 "Udet" – Defense of the Reich — 8 August – 14 October 1943
| 16 | 14 October 1943 | 14:40 | B-17 | 8 km (5.0 mi) east of Hammelburg | | | | | |
– Stab III. Gruppe of Jagdgeschwader 3 "Udet" – Defense of the Reich — 1 January – 5 June 1944
| 17 | 27 May 1944 | 12:17 | B-17* | PQ 04 Ost S/DO, southwest of Strasbourg | 19 | 30 May 1944 | 11:17 | B-17 | Dessau |
| 18 | 30 May 1944 | 11:12 | B-17 | Dessau | | | | | |
– Stab III. Gruppe of Jagdgeschwader 3 "Udet" – Normandy Invasion — 6 June – 22 September 1944
| 20 | 21 June 1944 | 19:10 | P-47 | PQ 04 Ost N/AD-7 vicinity of Houdan | 22 | 26 July 1944 | 14:50 | P-38 | PQ 14 West BU-2/3 east of Briouze |
| 21 | 21 June 1944 | 19:25 | P-51 | PQ 04 Ost N/AC-2 vicinity of Dreux | 23 | 19 August 1944 | 09:10 | P-47 | PQ 05 Ost UB-6/1 vicinity of Bernay |
– Stab III. Gruppe of Jagdgeschwader 3 "Udet" – Defense of the Reich — 24 November – 31 December 1944
| 24? (Note: According to Mathews and Foreman, this claim is unconfirmed.) | 23 December 1944 | — | B-26 | | 25 | 27 December 1944 | — | P-47 | |
– Stab III. Gruppe of Jagdgeschwader 3 "Udet" – Eastern Front — 1 January – May 1945
| 26 | 19 February 1945 | 08:55 | Boston | | 29 | 19 April 1945 | — | Il-2 | |
| 27 | 6 March 1945 | 15:24 | Il-2 | | 30 | 23 April 1945 | — | Yak-3 | |
| 28 | 18 March 1945 | — | Il-2 | | | | | | |

=== Awards ===
- Iron Cross (1939) 2nd and 1st Class
- Honor Goblet of the Luftwaffe (12 August 1944)
- German Cross in Gold on 26 July 1944 as Hauptmann in the III./Jagdgeschwader 3
- Knight's Cross of the Iron Cross on 20 April 1945 as Major and Gruppenkommandeur of the III./Jagdgeschwader 3 "Udet"

== Notes ==
Military offices
| Preceded by Major Walther Dahl | Commander of III. Jagdgeschwader 3; 21 May 1944 – 8 May 1945 | Succeeded by None |
