= Hans Schleef =

German fighter pilot (1920–1944)

- Born: 19 July 1920; Groß Börnecke, Germany
- Died: 31 December 1944 (aged 24); Bad Dürkheim, Germany
- Cause of death: Killed in action
- Military career
- Allegiance: Nazi Germany
- Branch: Luftwaffe
- Service years: 1937–1944
- Rank: Oberleutnant (first lieutenant)
- Units: JG 3, JG 5, JG 4
- Commands: 3./JG 3, 8./JG 5, 16./JG 4
- Conflicts: World War II: Eastern Front; Operation Zitadelle; Defense of the Reich
- Awards: Knight's Cross of the Iron Cross

Hans Schleef (19 July 1920 – 31 December 1944) was a German Luftwaffe military aviator and fighter ace during World War II. He is credited with at least 98 aerial victories achieved in over 500 combat missions. This figure includes 91 aerial victories on the Eastern Front, and further seven victories over the Western Allies, including one four-engined heavy bomber.

Born in Groß Börnecke, Schleef was posted to Jagdgeschwader 3 (JG 3—3rd Fighter Wing) in late 1940. He claimed his first aerial victory in February 1941 fighting against the Royal Air Force. In June 1941, his unit was transferred east and fought in Operation Barbarossa, the German invasion of the Soviet Union. On 9 May 1942, Schleef was awarded the Knight's Cross of the Iron Cross for 41 aerial victories claimed. He then served as a fighter pilot instructor with Ergänzungs-Jagdgruppe Ost and became an officer. Transferred back to JG 3 in February 1943, he claimed further aerial victories before his unit was transferred to Germany where they fought in Defense of the Reich. Schleef was appointed Staffelkapitän (squadron leader) of 3. Staffel (3rd squadron) of JG 3 in October 1943. He was transferred in July 1944, taking command of 8. Staffel of Jagdgeschwader 5 (JG 5—5th Fighter Wing), a squadron which became 16. Staffel of Jagdgeschwader 4 (JG 4—4th Fighter Wing) in October 1944. On 31 December 1944 during the Battle of the Bulge, he was shot down and killed in action by US fighters near Bad Dürkheim.

== Career ==
Schleef was born on 19 July 1920 in Groß Börnecke, present-day part of Hecklingen, at the time in the Province of Saxony within the Weimar Republic. Following flight training, (Note: Flight training in the Luftwaffe progressed through the levels A1, A2 and B1, B2, referred to as A/B flight training. A training included theoretical and practical training in aerobatics, navigation, long-distance flights and dead-stick landings. The B courses included high-altitude flights, instrument flights, night landings and training to handle the aircraft in difficult situations.) he was posted to 7. Staffel (7th squadron) of Jagdgeschwader 3 (JG 3—3rd Fighter Wing) in late 1940. The squadron was subordinated to III. Gruppe (3rd group) of JG 3 and at the time based at Desvres, France.

On 5 February 1941, the Royal Air Force (RAF) flew "Circus" No. 3 targeting the airfield at Saint-Omer. That day, Schleef claimed his first aerial victory when he shot down a Hawker Hurricane fighter. Ten days later, III. Gruppe was withdrawn from combat operations and relocated to Gütersloh Airfield in Germany. Following the return to Germany, the pilots went on R&R, skiing in Kleinwalsertal from 8 to 26 March. On 17 April, the Gruppe received a complement of factory new Messerschmitt Bf 109 F-2 aircraft. Following familiarization with the new aircraft, the Gruppe relocated to France on 5 May where they were initially based at Auchy-au-Bois. On 31 May, Schleef claimed his second and last aerial victory on the English Channel when he shot down a RAF Bristol Blenheim bomber. That day, the Gruppe received orders for relocation east. The ground elements were withdrawn on 2 June while the air elements of the Gruppe headed for Radom on 9 June.

=== Operation Barbarossa ===
The Gruppe relocated to an airfield at Moderówka on 18 June where the Gruppe concluded their last preparations for Operation Barbarossa, the German invasion of the Soviet Union. At the start of the campaign, JG 3 was subordinated to the V. Fliegerkorps (5th Air Corps), under command of General der Flieger Robert Ritter von Greim, which was part of Luftflotte 4 (4th Air Fleet), under command of Generaloberst Alexander Löhr. These air elements supported Generalfeldmarschall Gerd von Rundstedt's Heeresgruppe Süd (Army Group South), with the objective of capturing Ukraine and its capital Kiev. On 29 June, the air elements of III. Gruppe followed the German advance and relocated to Lutsk. Operating from Lutsk, Schleef claimed his first aerial victory on the Eastern Front on 2 July, shooting down a Polikarpov I-16 fighter.

During the early weeks of the Battle of Kiev, Schleef claimed further aerial victories while flying from an airfield Bila Tserkva, including his 20th on 4 August. By mid-August, many soldiers of JG 3 had fallen ill with Shigellosis, preventing them from flying further combat operations, and in some instances had to be sent home for a period of convalescence. During this period, Schleef was awarded the Honour Goblet of the Luftwaffe (Ehrenpokal der Luftwaffe) on 23 September 1941. On 6 November, III. Gruppe received orders for relocation to Germany for a period of rest and replenishment. Travelling by train, the various elements of the Gruppe relocated to Mannheim-Sandhofen Airfield. There, the majority of the staff were given leave for Christmas. Following the death of Generaloberst Ernst Udet, Reichsmarschall Hermann Göring ordered JG 3 to be given the honorary name "Udet" on 1 December.

=== Eastern Front ===
The first elements of the Gruppe arrived by train in Mannheim on 8 December, the transfer was completed a week later. There, the personnel were sent on home leave. The Gruppe received a full complement of 41 Messerschmitt Bf 109 F-4 aircraft and on 6 January 1942 was ordered to relocated to Sicily. On 13 January, 7. Staffel and elements of 8. and 9. Staffel boarded a train to Bari in southern Italy while the rest of III. Gruppe headed for Sciacca, Sicily. The relocation progressed until 26 January when new orders were received, ordering the Gruppe to return to Germany. At Jesau near Königsberg, present-day Kaliningrad in Russia, III. Gruppe began preparations for redeployment to the Eastern Front again. Schleef claimed his next aerial victories in February 1942 while German forces were fighting in the Demyansk Pocket, an area southeast of Lake Ilmen. The Gruppe had been moved to an airfield at Soltsy on 10 February. Schleef claimed an I-61 fighter, an early war designation for the Mikoyan-Gurevich MiG-3, on 20 February. On 4 May 1942, Schleef was awarded the German Cross in Gold (Deutsches Kreuz in Gold) followed by the Knight's Cross of the Iron Cross (Ritterkreuz des Eisernen Kreuzes) five days later for 41 aerial victories claimed.

From July 1942 to February 1943, Schleef served as an instructor with Ergänzungs-Jagdgruppe Ost, specialized training unit for new fighter pilots destined for the Eastern Front. On 5 July during the Battle of Kursk, Schleef was shot down in his Bf 109 G-4 (Werknummer 16 172—factory number) southeast of Grayvoron. His victor probably was a pilot from 40 GvIAP (Guards Fighter Aviation Regiment—Gvardeyskiy Istrebitelny Aviatsionny Polk) flying a Lavochkin La-5 fighter. When on 14 July Hauptmann Karl-Heinz Langer temporarily had been given command of III. Gruppe of JG 3, Schleef also temporarily replaced Langer as commander of 7. Staffel. When on 20 July, Hauptmann Walther Dahl officially was given command of III. Gruppe, Lange returned to 7. Staffel, relieving Schleef of the command.

On 1 August, III. Gruppe flew its last combat mission on the Eastern Front. That day, Schleef claimed a Lavochkin-Gorbunov-Gudkov LaGG-3 fighter on an early morning mission near Stepanivka. The following day, the Gruppe began its relocation to Münster-Handorf Airfield in Germany. Schleef's 93rd and last aerial victory claimed on the Eastern Front may be linked to the death of Soviet female fighter pilot Lydia Litvyak. However, time of death and type of aircraft flown by Litvyak, she flew a Yakovlev Yak-1 fighter, does not match the Luftwaffe records.

=== Defense of the Reich ===
III. Gruppe arrived in Münster-Handorf on 3 August where it was placed under the command of Dahl. The Gruppe immediately began preparations for Defense of the Reich (Reichsverteidigung) missions and was subordinated to Fighter Leader for the Holland area (Jafü Holland). Flying their first mission on the Western Front against United States Army Air Forces (USAAF) bombers, Schleef shot down a Boeing B-17 Flying Fortress north of Königswinter on 12 August. Five days later, Schleef was shot down in aerial combat with escorting Supermarine Spitfire fighters while defending against the Schweinfurt-Regensburg mission. He bailed out of his Bf 109 G-6 (Werknummer 20 444) and landed safely near 's-Heer Arendskerke.

When on 14 October 1943 the commander of 3. Staffel of JG 3 "Udet", Hauptman Rudolf Germeroth, was killed in action, Schleef was appointed Staffelkapitän (squadron leader) of this Staffel. On 20 July 1944, Schleef was transferred to Jagdgeschwader 5 (JG 5—5th Fighter Wing), where he became Staffelkapitän of 8. Staffel, succeeding Oberleutnant Lorenz Andresen who had been killed in action that day. Command of his former 3. Staffel of JG 3 was passed to Leutnant Wolf-Dietrich Stiebler. On 16 October, II. Gruppe of JG 5 moved to Finsterwalde. Four days later, the Gruppe was subordinated to Jagdgeschwader 4 (JG 4—4th Fighter Wing) where it became IV. Gruppe of JG 4. Consequently, Schleef's 8. Staffel of JG 5 became 16. Staffel of JG 4. On 20 November, the Gruppe relocated to the Frankfurt Rhein/Main Airfield.

On 23 December during the Battle of the Bulge, Schleef led a flight IV. Gruppe of JG 4 which intercepted Republic P-47 Thunderbolt fighters of the 514th Fighter-Bomber Squadron of the 406th Fighter Group near Trier. In this encounter, IV. Gruppe pilots claimed three P-47 fighters shot down, including one by Schleef, for the loss of five of their own. Schleef was killed in action on 31 December 1944, shot down near Bad Dürkheim in his Bf 109 G-10 (Werknummer 490 758). He was shot down by USAAF P-47 fighters patrolling west of the Rhine.

== Summary of career ==
=== Aerial victory claims ===
According to US historian David T. Zabecki, Schleef was credited with 99 aerial victories. Spick lists Schleef with 98 aerial victories, of which 92 were claimed over the Eastern Front and a further six over the Western Allies, claimed in over 500 combat missions. Mathews and Foreman, authors of Luftwaffe Aces – Biographies and Victory Claims, researched the German Federal Archives and found records for 96 aerial victory claims. This figure of confirmed claims includes 89 aerial victories on the Eastern Front and seven over the Western Allies, including one four-engined heavy bomber.

Victory claims were logged to a map-reference (PQ = Planquadrat), for example "PQ 35 Ost 6013". The Luftwaffe grid map (Jägermeldenetz) covered all of Europe, western Russia and North Africa and was composed of rectangles measuring 15 minutes of latitude by 30 minutes of longitude, an area of about 360 square miles (930 km^{2}). These sectors were then subdivided into 36 smaller units to give a location area 3 km × 4 km (1.9 mi × 2.5 mi) in size.

Chronicle of aerial victories
This and the ? (question mark) indicates information discrepancies listed by Prien, Stemmer, Rodeike, Bock, Mathews and Foreman.
– 7. Staffel of Jagdgeschwader 3 – At the Channel and over England — 26 June 1940 – 9 June 1941
1	5 February 1941	13:40	Hurricane	northwest of Saint-Omer	2	31 May 1941	17:43	Blenheim	
– 7. Staffel of Jagdgeschwader 3 – Operation Barbarossa — 22 June – 4 October 1941
3	2 July 1941	18:06	I-16? (Note: According to Mathews and Foreman claimed as Polikarpov I-153.)		13	26 July 1941	06:42	I-153	
4	6 July 1941	17:25	SB-2		14	26 July 1941	10:02	SB-3	8 km (5.0 mi) southeast of Tarashcha
5	10 July 1941	18:38	I-16		15	26 July 1941	10:04	SB-3	8 km (5.0 mi) southeast of Tarashcha
6	15 July 1941	15:51	I-16		16	29 July 1941	07:36	R-5	
7	15 July 1941	16:02	DB-3		17	29 July 1941	07:42	Pe-2	
8	16 July 1941	15:26	SB-3		18	4 August 1941	06:08	I-16	
9	16 July 1941	15:28	SB-2		19	4 August 1941	06:12	I-16	
10	23 July 1941	13:41	DB-3		20	4 August 1941	07:52	I-16	
11	24 July 1941	14:04	DB-3		21	10 August 1941	10:40	I-16	
12	25 July 1941	18:53	SB-3		22	11 August 1941	05:24	SB-2	
– 7. Staffel of Jagdgeschwader 3 "Udet" – Eastern Front — 10 February – 14 April 1942
23	20 February 1942	12:36	I-61 (MiG-3)	vicinity of Demyansk	33	20 March 1942	07:30	I-61 (MiG-3)	vicinity of Demyansk
24	22 February 1942	13:18	I-61 (MiG-3)	Staraya Russa/Demyansk	34	22 March 1942	13:15	Il-2	vicinity of Demyansk
25	27 February 1942	10:48	I-61 (MiG-3)	vicinity of Demyansk	35	28 March 1942	13:52	I-61 (MiG-3)	northeast of Staraya Russa
26	4 March 1942	09:06	U-2	Staraya Russa/Demyansk	36	28 March 1942	13:54	I-301 (LaGG-3)	northeast of Staraya Russa
27	9 March 1942	09:00	I-61 (MiG-3)	vicinity of Demyansk	37	29 March 1942	07:53	U-2	
28	17 March 1942	09:48	I-61 (MiG-3)	vicinity of Demyansk	38	30 March 1942	09:58? (Note: According to Mathews and Foreman claimed at 09:59.)	I-61 (MiG-3)	
29	18 March 1942	17:38	I-61 (MiG-3)	10 km (6.2 mi) northwest of Mury	39	30 March 1942	15:22	I-61 (MiG-3)	
30	18 March 1942	18:10	U-2	north of Ramuschewo	40	6 April 1942	16:41	Il-2	
31	19 March 1942	15:56	I-61 (MiG-3)	vicinity of Demyansk	41	6 April 1942	16:43	Il-2	
32	19 March 1942	16:03	SB-3	vicinity of Demyansk					
– 7. Staffel of Jagdgeschwader 3 "Udet" – Eastern Front — 19 May – 30 June 1942
42	22 May 1942	18:03	Il-2		45	23 May 1942	12:32	Il-2	3 km (1.9 mi) east of Wesseloje
43	22 May 1942	18:05	MiG-1		46	27 May 1942	04:18	MiG-1	
44	23 May 1942	06:30	MiG-1		47	30 June 1942	07:42	Il-2	
– 7. Staffel of Jagdgeschwader 3 "Udet" – Eastern Front — 4 February – 1 August 1943
48	27 February 1943	14:30	Pe-2	9 km (5.6 mi) southeast of Izium	71	2 June 1943	10:35	La-5	south of Kursk
49? (Note: This claim is not listed by Mathews and Foreman.)	27 February 1943	—	Pe-2	southeast of Izium	72	10 June 1943	08:30	La-5	east of Novo-Astrakhan
50	27 February 1943	14:40	U-2	1 km (0.62 mi) west of Gregenskoye	73	14 June 1943	14:33	La-5	west of Nishnaja Duwanka
51	2 March 1943	14:30	MiG-3	1 km (0.62 mi) south of Makiivka	74	15 June 1943	17:32	LaGG-3	north of Starobilsk
52	12 March 1943	08:08	MiG-1	1 km (0.62 mi) south of Kupiansk	75	15 June 1943	17:36	LaGG-3	north of Starobilsk
53?	13 March 1943	11:32	Il-2	south of Petschannoye	76	16 June 1943	18:20	LaGG-3	northeast of Starobilsk
54	13 March 1943	11:34	Il-2	south of Petschannoye	77	5 July 1943	06:35	La-5	north of Tomarovka
55	15 March 1943	06:54	Boston	PQ 35 Ost 6013, vicinity of Lipzy	78	5 July 1943	15:22	Il-2	east of Belgorod
56	18 March 1943	09:45	LaGG-3	7 km (4.3 mi) north of Chuhuiv	79	5 July 1943	15:24	Il-2	east of Belgorod
57	22 March 1943	12:32	La-5	Rostov	80	5 July 1943	15:26	LaGG-3	east of Belgorod
58	31 March 1943	10:00	MiG-1	10 km (6.2 mi) south of Bataysk	81	6 July 1943	15:10	LaGG-3	west of Nikolskoye
59	3 April 1943	13:15? (Note: According to Mathews and Foreman claimed at 12:55.)	Il-2? (Note: According to Mathews and Foreman claimed as a Lavochkin-Gorbunov-Gudkov LaGG-3.)	1 km (0.62 mi) southwest of Izium	82	6 July 1943	19:15	La-5	south of Gorodishche
60	3 April 1943	16:40? (Note: According to Mathews and Foreman claimed at 13:35.)	Il-2?	6 km (3.7 mi) southwest of Izium	83	9 July 1943	06:20	La-5	north-northeast of Pokrovka
61	4 April 1943	09:56	Il-2	1 km (0.62 mi) south of Izium	84	11 July 1943	10:06	Il-2	west of Prokhorovka
62	7 May 1943	04:13	Boston	northwest of Sloviansk	85	14 July 1943	12:33	LaGG-3	west of Pesski
63	7 May 1943	04:14	Boston	northwest of Sloviansk	86	14 July 1943	12:49	LaGG-3	west of Wesselyi
64	22 May 1943	12:13	La-5	west of Olschewka	87	17 July 1943	15:20	LaGG-3	1 km (0.62 mi) north of Tscherwonny-Oskol
65	22 May 1943	12:18	MiG-3	east of Wesselyi	88	21 July 1943	09:43	P-39	1 km (0.62 mi) south of Gorodishche
66	22 May 1943	12:22	MiG-3	east of Grjesnoje	89	21 July 1943	09:46	Il-2	2 km (1.2 mi) southeast of Gorodishche
67	30 May 1943	06:58	LaGG-3	southeast of Platowo	90	21 July 1943	09:49	Il-2	8 km (5.0 mi) east of Gorodishche
68	30 May 1943	07:04	Pe-2	southeast of Platowo	91	30 July 1943	11:00	Il-2	3 km (1.9 mi) east of Marinovka
69	30 May 1943	17:05	Boston	north of Dzerzhinsk	92	30 July 1943	11:05	LaGG-3	east of Marinovka
70	30 May 1943	17:20	La-5	west of Nowo-Aibar	93	1 August 1943	05:25	LaGG-3	southeast of Stepanivka
– 7. Staffel of Jagdgeschwader 3 "Udet" – Defense of the Reich — 8 August – 31 December 1943
94	12 August 1943	09:18	B-17	2 km (1.2 mi) north of Königswinter					
– 3. Staffel of Jagdgeschwader 3 "Udet" – Defense of the Reich — 9 January – 6 June 1944
95	22 February 1944	12:17	P-47	PQ 05 Ost S/LL-1 south of Tilburg	96	8 March 1944	13:40	P-51	PQ 15 Ost S/HE; Loburg-Görzke
– 16. Staffel of Jagdgeschwader 4 – Defense of the Reich — 20 October – 31 December 1944
97	12 December 1944	15:45	P-47	PQ 05 Ost SR-2 west of Ludwigshafen	98	23 December 1944	09:51	P-47	PQ 05 Ost RO vicinity of Wittlich

=== Awards ===
- Iron Cross (1939) 2nd and 1st Class
- Honor Goblet of the Luftwaffe on 23 September 1941 as Feldwebel in a Jagdgeschwader
- German Cross in Gold on 4 May 1942 as Feldwebel in the 7./Jagdgeschwader 3
- Knight's Cross of the Iron Cross on 9 May 1942 as Feldwebel and pilot in the 7./Jagdgeschwader 3 "Udet"

== Notes ==
Military offices
Preceded by Hauptmann Rudolf Germeroth	Squadron Leader of 3./JG 3; 15 October 1943 – 20 July 1944	Succeeded by Leutnant Wolf-Dietrich Stiebler
Preceded by Oberleutnant Lorenz Andresen	Squadron Leader of 8./JG 5; 21 July 1944 – 20 October 1944	Succeeded by unit renamed 16./JG 4
Preceded by new unit	Squadron Leader of 16./JG 4; 20 October 1944 – 31 December 1944	Unknown
