= Ernst Kühl =

German officer in the Luftwaffe

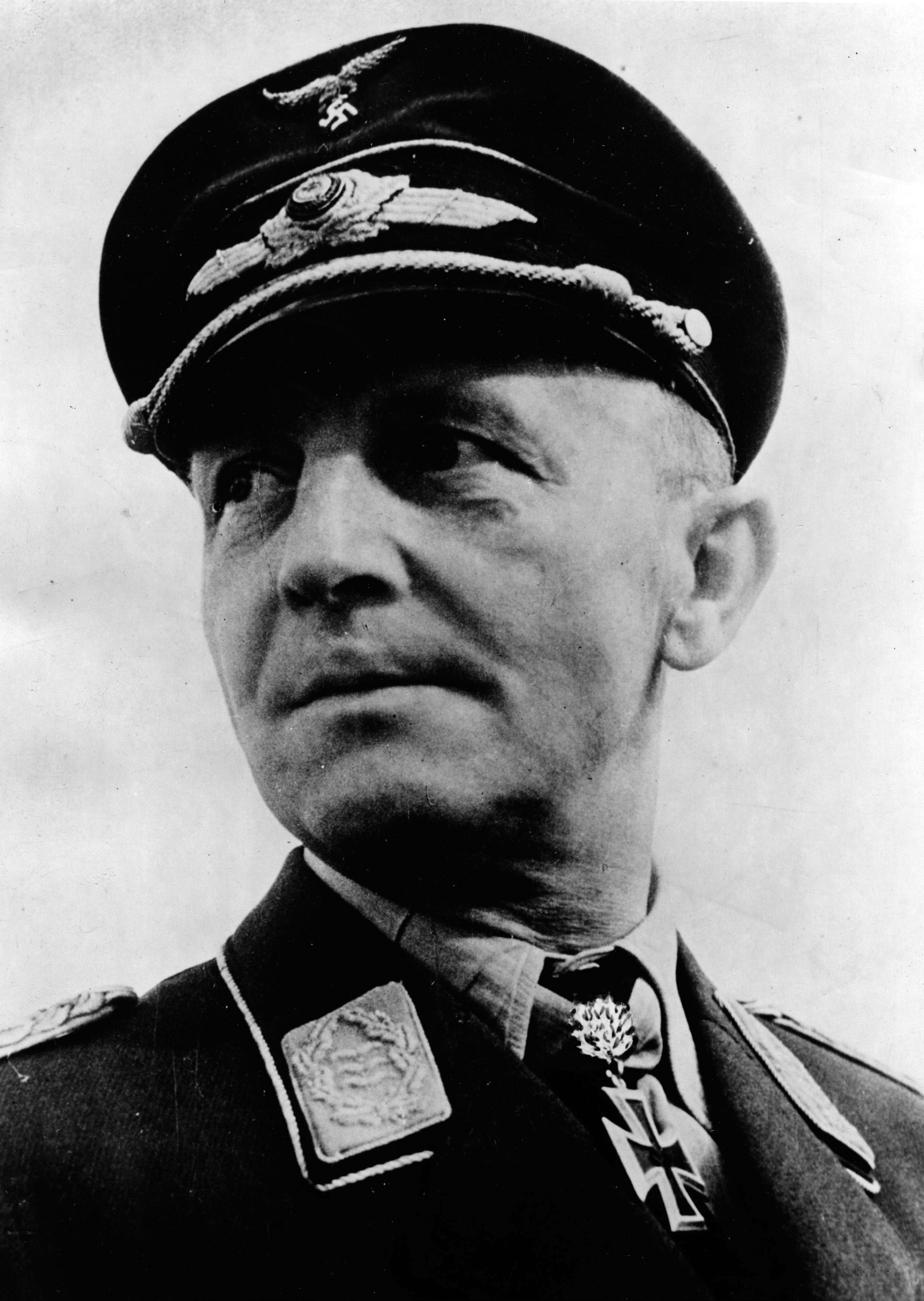
- Born: 18 March 1888
- Died: 2 February 1972 (aged 83)
- Military career
- Allegiance: Nazi Germany
- Branch: Luftwaffe
- Rank: Oberst
- Commands: Kampfgeschwader 55; 3. Flieger-Division; 5th Air Division
- Conflicts: World War II
- Awards: Knight's Cross of the Iron Cross with Oak Leaves

Ernst Kühl (24 October 1888 – 2 February 1972) served as a German officer in the Luftwaffe during World War II. He was honored with the Knight's Cross of the Iron Cross with Oak Leaves, an esteemed decoration of Nazi Germany.

== Awards and decorations ==
- Clasp to the Iron Cross (1939) 2nd Class (1939) & 1st Class (1940)
- German Cross in Gold on 21 August 1942, as Oberstleutnant in the II./Kampfgeschwader 55
- Knight's Cross of the Iron Cross with Oak Leaves
  - Knight's Cross on 17 October 1942 as Oberstleutnant of the Reserve and Geschwaderkommodore of Kampfgeschwader 55
  - 356th Oak Leaves on 18 December 1943 as Oberst of the Reserves and Geschwaderkommodore of Kampfgeschwader 55 "Greif"
- Great Cross of Merit of the Federal Republic of Germany

Military offices
Preceded by Oberstleutnant Benno Kosch	Commander of Kampfgeschwader 55; 27 August 1942 – 7 August 1943	Succeeded by Oberstleutnant Wilhelm Antrup
Preceded by Generalleutnant Alexander Holle	Commander of Fliegerführer Nord (Ost); August 1943 – February 1944	Succeeded by Oberst Hermann Busch
Preceded by reformed from V. Fliegerkorps	Commander of 5. Flieger Division (1944–1945); 19 December 1944 – 31 January 1945	Succeeded by Generalmajor Walter Storp
