= Walter Storp =

- Born: 2 February 1910; Schnecken, East Prussia
- Died: 9 August 1981 (aged 71); Goslar
- Military career
- Allegiance: Weimar Republic; Nazi Germany
- Branch: Luftwaffe
- Service years: 1928–45
- Rank: Generalmajor
- Commands: KG 6, SKG 210, KG 76
- Conflicts: Spanish Civil War; World War II
- Awards: Knight's Cross of the Iron Cross with Oak Leaves

Walter Storp (2 February 1910 – 9 August 1981) was a German bomber pilot and commander of several bomber wings during World War II. He was a recipient of the Knight's Cross of the Iron Cross with Oak Leaves. Storp reached the rank of Generalmajor and ended the war as commander of the 5th Air Division in Norway.

Storp was born on 2 February 1910 in Schnecken, East Prussia, the son of a forester. After he received his Abitur (diploma) in 1928 he joined the military service and served in the navy. Holding the rank of Oberleutnant he served in the Bordfliegerstaffel 1./106 (on board flyers squadron) until February 1936. From May to September he was a pilot aboard the heavy cruiser Admiral Scheer, participating in the ship's first cruise of the Spanish Civil War in August 1936.

Storp was assigned to the Reich Ministry of Aviation on 1 October 1938 and at the same time became the chief pilot of general Hans Jeschonnek. Serving briefly with KG 30 in early 1940, Storp became temporary Gruppenkommandeur of III gruppe, KG 4 between May and August 1940. He was then appointed group commander of II./Kampfgeschwader 76 (II./KG 76—2nd Group of the 76th Bomber Wing) on 12 September 1940. He and his crew performed a successful low-altitude attack over the English Midlands on 27 September 1940.

In April 1941 Storp was appointed commander of Schnellkampfgeschwader 210, leading the unit during operations against the Soviet Union during 1941. He then was transferred to a RLM staff appointment in October 1941, before a further move in September 1942, as Geschwaderkommodore of Kampfgeschwader 6. A return to KG 76 occurred in June 1944, while in February 1945 he became Commander of the 5th Flieger-Division until the end of the war.

== Awards ==
- Iron Cross (1939) 2nd Class (2 October 1939) & 1st Class (26 April 1940)
- Ehrenpokal der Luftwaffe (20 October 1940)
- Knight's Cross of the Iron Cross with Oak Leaves
  - Knight's Cross (21 October 1940) 149th recipient in the Luftwaffe as Hauptmann and Gruppenkommandeur of the II./ Kampfgeschwader 76
  - Oak Leaves (14 July 1941) as Major und Geschwaderkommodore of the Schnellkampfgeschwader 210

Military offices
Preceded by none	Commander of Schnellkampfgeschwader 210; 24 April 1941 – 30 September 1941	Succeeded by Major Arved Crüger
Preceded by Oberstleutnant Hahn	Commander of Kampfgeschwader 6; 1 September 1942 – 11 September 1943	Succeeded by Oberstleutnant Hermann Hogeback
Preceded by Oberstleutnant Rudolf Hallensleben	Commander of Kampfgeschwader 76; 1 June 1944 – 30 September 1944	Succeeded by Oberleutnant Robert Kowalewski
Preceded by —	General der Kampfflieger; 1 October 1944 – 31 January 1945	Succeeded by —
Preceded by Oberst Dr. Ernst Kühl	Commander of 5th Air Division (1944–1945); 31 January 1945 – 8 May 1945	Succeeded by —
