= Hermann Hogeback =

German World War II military aviator

- Hogeback (center), on the cover of Der Adler, a propaganda publication of the Luftwaffe (1943)
- Born: 25 August 1914; Idar-Oberstein, German Empire
- Died: 15 February 2004 (aged 89); Dötlingen, Germany
- Military career
- Allegiance: Nazi Germany
- Branch: Army (1934–1935); Luftwaffe (1935–1945)
- Service years: 1934–1945
- Rank: Oberstleutnant (lieutenant colonel)
- Commands: 9.(K)/LG 1 III./LG 1 KG 6
- Conflicts: Spanish Civil War; World War II: Battle of France; Battle of Britain; Mediterranean theatre of operations; Eastern Front; Defense of the Reich
- Awards: Spanish Cross in Gold; Knight's Cross of the Iron Cross with Oak Leaves and Swords

Hermann Hogeback (25 August 1914 – 15 February 2004) was a German bomber pilot during the Nazi era. He flew more than 100 operational sorties during the Spanish Civil War and 500 during World War II and was a recipient of the Knight's Cross of the Iron Cross with Oak Leaves and Swords of Nazi Germany. Hogeback's last service position was commander of the 6th Bomber Wing.

Born in 1914, Hogeback joined the military service of the Wehrmacht in 1934. He transferred to the Luftwaffe in 1935; he volunteered for service with the Condor Legion in the Spanish Civil War. During World War II he fought in the Invasion of Poland, Battle of France, Operation Weserübung, the German invasion of Norway, Battle of Britain, Battle of Crete, siege of Malta, Mediterranean theatre of operations, over the Eastern Front and in Defense of the Reich.

== Childhood, early career and Spanish Civil War ==
Hogeback, the son of a tax inspector, was born on 25 August 1914 in Idar-Oberstein at the time in the Grand Duchy of Oldenburg, a state of the German Empire. Growing up in Münster from 1921 on he graduated with his Abitur (diploma) in 1933. From 1 October 1933 to 1 July 1934, he studied two semesters of physical education to become a teacher. Hogeback then joined the military service as an officer cadet in the 9th Company of Infantry Regiment 15, 5th Division of the Reichswehr in Kassel. (Note: According to Kaiser, Hogeback joined the military service on 1 July 1934. However Schumann states that he joined on 1 April 1934 and was promoted to Fahnenjunker (cadet) on 1 June 1934.) Following his officers training he transferred to the Luftwaffe a year later where he received his pilot training at Neuruppin, Ludwigslust and at the R.B.-Strecke of the Deutsche Luft Hansa. During this training period he was promoted to Leutnant (second lieutenant) on 1 June 1936. After he completed his bomber pilot training he transferred to the III./Lehrgeschwader Greifswald (3rd group of Demonstration Wing Greifswald), which was formed on 1 April 1937 and later became the III./Lehrgeschwader 1 (LG 1—1st Demonstration Wing). (Note: For an explanation of Luftwaffe unit designations see Organisation of the Luftwaffe during World War II.) Hogeback then transferred to the II./Kampfgeschwader 355 (2nd group of the 355th Bomber Wing) on 1 May 1938 and to Kampfgeschwader 253 (243rd Bomber Wing) on 1 September 1938.

Following his promotion to Oberleutnant (first lieutenant) Hogeback volunteered for combat service with the Condor Legion (Legion Condor) where he flew more than 100 missions in the Spanish Civil War. The Condor Legion was a unit composed of volunteers from the Luftwaffe and from the German Army (Heer) which served in the Spanish Civil War in support of the Nationalists. His Heinkel He 111 was shot down by republican anti-aircraft artillery on his first mission with 1. Kampfgruppe 88 in Spain. (Note: According to Kaiser this mission was flown on 13 September 1938, Schumann states the 1 October 1938 for this mission.) The mission was to attack positions at Móra d'Ebre and Ebro. Hogeback's starboard engine was hit and caught fire. Attempting to return to Zaragoza-Sanjurjo, he had to give the order to abandon the aircraft. The combat observer, Poppenhagen, and the flight engineer, Hermann, managed to bail out but the radio operator Unteroffizier Gerhard Pacht, was wounded and failed to escape. Hogeback bailed out as well but sustained skull and lung injuries when he struck the antenna and vertical stabilizer and came down in no man's land where he was recovered the following night. For his services in Spain he was awarded the Spanish Cross in Gold with Swords (Spanienkreuz in Gold mit Schwertern) in June 1939.

== World War II ==
At the outbreak of World War II on 1 September 1939, Hogeback was back with III./LG 1 where he flew the He 111 in combat missions in the Invasion of Poland. His Gruppe (group) converted to the then new Junkers Ju 88 at the beginning of 1940. He flew further combat missions in the Battle of France. In summer of 1940 he flew missions against England in what would become the Battle of Britain, including 28 missions over London.

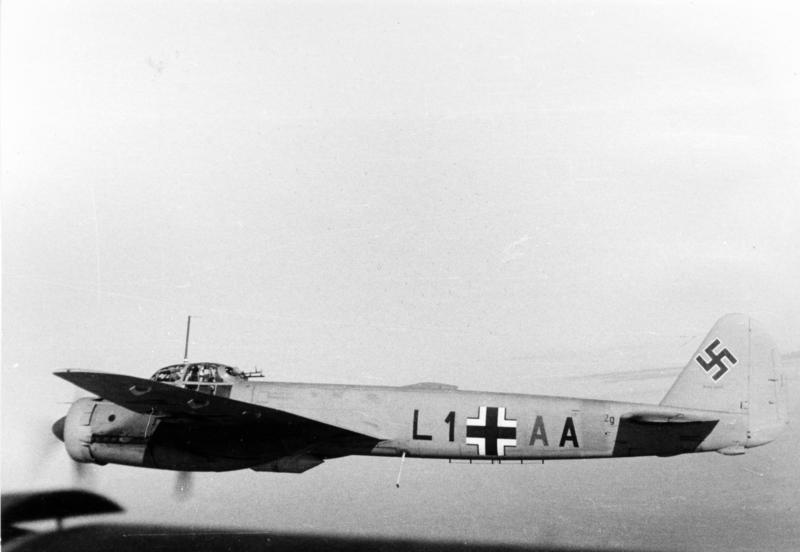
A Ju 88 of LG 1 similar to those flown by Hogeback.

Hogeback and III./LG 1 was relocated to Sicily for operations in the siege of Malta and on 20 January 1941 he was appointed Staffelkapitän (squadron leader) of the 8./LG 1. On one of his first missions in the Mediterranean theatre he was credited with the sinking of a 10,000 gross register tons (GRT) freighter. His Ju 88 came under attack from 12 British fighters during an aerial reconnaissance flight over the Mediterranean Sea in July 1941. The British fighters broke off the attack following aerial combat, during the course of which Hogeback's radio operator Feldwebel (Sergeant) Willy Lehnert managed to shoot down two of the attackers.

On 8 September 1941, after 163 combat missions, Oberleutnant Hogeback received the Knight's Cross of the Iron Cross (Ritterkreuz des Eisernen Kreuzes) from the hands of Fliegerführer Afrika Generalmajor (Lieutenant General) Stefan Fröhlich at Derna in North Africa. In the summer of 1942, III./LG 1 under the command of Hogeback was subordinated to Fliegerführer Süd (Flying Leader South), flying anti-shipping missions over the Black Sea on the Eastern Front.

On 20 February 1943, for his leadership of III.(Kampf)/LG 1, Hogeback was awarded the Knight's Cross of the Iron Cross with Oak Leaves (Ritterkreuz des Eisernen Kreuzes mit Eichenlaub), the 192nd German soldier so honoured. The award was presented at the Wolf's Lair, or Wolfsschanze (Führer Headquarters, at Rastenburg, East Prussia) in early March 1943. Hogeback together with Hauptmann Erwin Fischer, an aerial reconnaissance pilot with Fernaufklärungs-Gruppe 121 (Long–range Reconnaissance Group 121), received the award directly from Adolf Hitler. At this presentation Hitler commented that eligibility for high awards was most difficult to achieve for reconnaissance pilots, next were the bomber pilots, and last and most easy for the "fine gentlemen" from the fighter force. Hitler then said that this procedure would be changed before inviting them to tea along with Luftwaffe adjutant Oberst Nicolaus von Below.

On 12 August 1943 Hogeback was appointed to succeed Oberst Walter Storp as Geschwaderkommodore (Wing Commander) of Kampfgeschwader 6 (KG 6—6th Bomber Wing) and was promoted to Oberstleutnant (Lieutenant Colonel) with effect from 1 May 1944. On 18 October 1944 KG 6, along with Kampfgeschwader 27 (KG 27—27th Bomber Wing), Kampfgeschwader 30 (KG 30—30th Bomber Wing) and Kampfgeschwader 55 (KG 55—55th Bomber Wing) were subordinated to the newly formed IX. (J) Fliegerkorps. KG 6 received the suffix "J" to its name—J stands for Jagd (fighter aircraft)—and was now known as Kampfgeschwader (J) 6, denoting its fighter aircraft character. Hogeback ordered all the remaining Junkers Ju 88 and Junkers Ju 188 units transferred to other units. KG(J) 6 then transferred to Prague for conversion to the Messerschmitt Me 262 jet fighter.

Between 1943 and 1945 every member of Hogeback's Ju 88 crew was awarded the Knight's Cross of the Iron Cross, making it the most highly and only so decorated crew in the Luftwaffe. Air gunner Oberfeldwebel Günter Glasner—crew member since early 1940—received the Knight's Cross on 31 December 1943, radio operator Oberfeldwebel Willy Lehnert—crew member since March 1941—on 5 April 1944, and observer Fahnenjunker-Oberfeldwebel Wilhelm Dipberger—crew member since 1940—on 9 January 1945.

Following the German capitulation in May 1945, Hogeback was taken prisoner of war by United States Army forces. He was held captive in London, England, and at Sainte-Mère-Église, France, before being released in September 1945.

== Later life ==
After the war Hermann Hogeback studied law and worked in the automobile industry. He died on 15 February 2004 at the age of 89 in Dötlingen, Lower Saxony, and was buried with full military honors.

== Summary of career ==
=== Awards ===
- Medalla de la Campaña (4 May 1939)
- Spanish Medalla Militar
- Spanish Cross in Gold with Swords (6 June 1939)
- Front Flying Clasp of the Luftwaffe in Gold with Pennant "500"
- Combined Pilots-Observation Badge
- Italian aviator badge
- Crimea Shield
- Wound Badge (1939) in Black
- German Cross in Gold on 24 September 1942 as Hauptmann in the III./Lehrgeschwader 1
- Iron Cross (1939)
  - 2nd Class (20 May 1940)
  - 1st Class (26 September 1940)
- Knight's Cross of the Iron Cross with Oak Leaves and Swords
  - Knight's Cross on 8 September 1941 as Oberleutnant and Staffelkapitän of the 9.(K)/Lehrgeschwader 1 (Note: According to Scherzer in the 8.(K)/Lehrgeschwader 1. According to Von Seemen as Staffelkapitän in Lehrgeschwader 1.)
  - 192nd Oak Leaves on 19 February 1943 as Hauptmann and Gruppenkommandeur of the III./Lehrgeschwader 1
  - 125th Swords on 26 January 1945 as Oberstleutnant and Geschwaderkommodore of Kampfgeschwader 6

=== Dates of rank ===
1 April 1936:	Leutnant (second lieutenant)
1 March 1939:	Oberleutnant (first lieutenant)
1 October 1941:	Hauptmann (captain)
1 March 1943:	Major (major)
1 April 1944:	Oberstleutnant (lieutenant colonel)

== Notes ==
Military offices
Preceded by Oberstleutnant Walter Storp	Commander of Kampfgeschwader 6; 12 August 1943 – 8 May 1945	Succeeded by disbanded
