= Kampfgeschwader 6 =

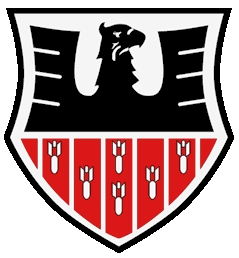
- Active: 1942–44
- Country: Nazi Germany
- Branch: Luftwaffe
- Type: Bomber Squadron
- Role: Tactical and Direct Ground Support.
- Size: Air Force Wing
- Engagements: Battle of the Caucasus; Battle of Stalingrad; Operation Steinbock; Operation Cobra; Battle of Caen; Falaise pocket

Commanders
- Notable commanders: Hermann Hogeback

Insignia
- Identification symbol: Geschwaderkennung of 3E

Kampfgeschwader 6 (KG 6) (Bomber Wing 6) was a Luftwaffe bomber unit during the Second World War. The unit was formed between April and September 1942 and was equipped with Dornier Do 217, Junkers Ju 188 and Junkers Ju 88 bombers.

The Geschwader bombed Britain, the Eastern Front, North Africa, Italy and Normandy.

== Formation ==
While officially formed on or about 1 September 1942 at Dinard/Brittany in northern France, the history of the Geschwader dates back to 11 October 1941. On that date, the Luftwaffenführungssab in Berlin ordered Luftflotte 3 in Paris to form a Stab unit for a new Kampfgeschwader which was to carry the number 6. The new bomber formation was to comprise Küstenfliegergruppe 106, Kampfgruppe 606 and stab./Küstenfliegergruppe 406, with its subordinated staffeln. The first date that KG 6 was mentioned was 30 April 1942, when Luftflotte 3 documents recorded its formation at Dinard under Fliegerführer Atlantik, but with no aircraft or aircrews. On 3 June 1942, the new unit's Geschwaderkommodore Oberstleutnant Joachim Hahn, former Kommandeur of Kampfgruppe 606, while flying a Messerschmitt Bf 108 near Dieppe, was shot down and killed by Royal Canadian Air Force fighter pilots of No. 401 Squadron. In August 1942, Berlin ordered a full Geschwader to be formed, stating that the unit was to be a special bomber force to operate against key British industrial targets, as well as command and communication centres. To this end, it was to have its own pathfinder capability.

== Operational history ==
=== Early raids, 1942–43 ===
I./KG 6 bombed British targets throughout the year, and suffered only one recorded loss against RAF Mosquito night fighters. The German raids were usually carried out with only a few aircraft. On one rare occasion, the unit took part in a raid of 57 aircraft on Canterbury on 31 October 1942. II./KG 6 had only formed on 1 August, so bombing missions over Britain were few. III./KG 6 targeted Hull and factories in Exeter in January, losing two Ju 88A-4s on 11 January 1943. The unit bombed Newcastle, Sunderland and Edinburgh in the northeast of England. The unit also bombed London, Norwich and Birmingham. In the summer of 1943, I. and III. Gruppen bombed Norwich on 4 and 5 May, with 36 aircraft. An attack on ball bearing plants in Chelmsford took place on 13 and 14 May, I. Gruppe took part with other Geschwadern in sending 76 aircraft to bomb Sunderland's docks. On 17 and 18 May, 74 bombers hit Cardiff. In June 1943, the Gruppen moved to Sardinia.

=== Eastern Front ===
III./KG 6 had not participated in the raids on Britain and was sent to the Eastern Front to support Army Group North, where it spent the period of September to December 1942 bombing targets in the northern Soviet Union. Under Luftflotte 1, it bombed the railway station at Volkhov on 15 September and supported ground operations around Lake Ladoga a day later. It attacked Red Army positions at Gaytolovo and Markovo during the 20–23 September battles. On 25 September, it struck rail targets at Chum, losing one aircraft; and on the 28th targets in and around Leningrad were hit. On 30 September, another Ju 88A-4 was lost in the Kerstov area.

The unit was redeployed to Stalingrad on 4 October as a planned assault by Erich von Manstein's Eleventh Army was postponed. Rail targets in Stalingrad were bombed. Soviet artillery in the North Caucasus, and Astrakhan were bombed from 9 to 18 October.

=== North Africa and the Mediterranean ===
I. Gruppe was engaged in anti-shipping missions off the North African coast. Allocated to 2nd Flieger Division based at Creil in southern France, it targeted Allied shipping in Algerian waters. It ended these operations in March 1943, moving to France to undertake raids over Great Britain. II. Gruppe succeeded in supporting German forces in the Dodecanese Campaign, operating from bases at Larissa, in Greece. It withdrew to Le Culot, Belgium in December 1943. III. Gruppe also took part in the Dodecanese action.

=== Italian Campaign ===
I Gruppe continued to support the Army in Italy. The Gruppe suffered steady losses during night and daylight missions. The air defences were particularly threatening. On 7 August the Gruppe carried out a raid on Bizerte harbour, Tunisia, claiming a direct hit on a 5,000-ton cargo ship. Air reconnaissance later seemed to have confirmed the claim. Various raids were carried out against Allied airfields in Sicily. However, heavy attacks on bases caused numerous losses to the group.

Between July and 1 August 1942, III. Gruppe was created. It was a 'fire brigade' unit, constantly switching from front to front from August to October 1942. The gruppe was then moved to Sicily to support the Afrika Korps. Anti-shipping attacks against the North African coast were made without significant success and the odd loss. In December 1943 the gruppe was moved back to France to carry out raids against British targets.

=== Operation Steinbock ===
The Steinbock operation was launched against the United Kingdom in retaliation for the RAF's bombing of German cities, which at that time was dubbed the Battle of Berlin.

I.KG 6 began offensive operations with 41 Ju 88s based at Chievres, Belgium under IX. Fliegerkorps. It carried out raids against London on 20 January 1944 but suffered heavy losses. Crews were often sent on missions they were not fit for until they were shot down or crashed. By 20 March, just 13 Ju 188s remained, only 10 of them operational. On the night/morning of 21/22 March, the unit raided London again. For the next six weeks, the unit was withdrawn for rest and refitting. It resumed attacks in May, losing an aircraft on 14/15 May and attacked Allied shipping in the Bristol channel. On 22 and 23 May, it contributed to a fleet of 104 aircraft that attacked Portsmouth. On 27 and 28 May, it attacked Weymouth Bay and on 30 and 31 May, dropped mines off Falmouth. It also bombed the docks as part of a 51-aircraft force. During Steinbock the commanding officer of the group, Major Helmut Fuhrhop was shot down and killed by Hawker Typhoons while on a transfer flight from Paris to Dreux in Ju 188 3E+KH, belonging to 1 staffel. All aboard were killed including his two boxer dogs; Oberfeldwebel Alfred Schubert, Alfons Eichschmidt, Walter Rehfeldt, Wilhelm Scachtshabel and Arnold Buttner.

II./KG 6, with 39 Ju 88As, was based at Le Culot, Belgium. It participated in seven major raids on London in February 1944, and bombed London from 13 to 15 March. On 24 and 25 March 1944, it attacked Whitehall and Westminster, in London. The unit returned to attack London again on 18 and 19 April. On 14 and 15 May, it attacked Allied invasion shipping in Bristol Harbour with a fleet of 91 aircraft (with other Geschwader), without suffering any losses. Along with the other Gruppen, it took part in the Portsmouth and Falmouth raids on 22/23, 29/30 and 30/31 May. By the end of Operation Steinbock, the Gruppe had been decimated.

III./KG 6 had 41 Ju 88 A and S variants (of which a total of 37 were operational), from Brussels, Belgium. This unit flew missions in support of Steinbock as well, and recorded high losses. It took part in the first raid of the year against London on 21/22 January 1944 and more raids on 29/30 January; 3/4, 20/21, 24/25 February; and 14/15, 21/22 March. The unit left Belgium for Hungary to participate in Operation Margarethe, the Nazi occupation of that country. It returned to Belgium on 21 March and resumed attacks on London on 24 and 25 March, and on Bristol on 27 and 28 March. It took part in a major assault on London on 18 and 19 April 1944, during which the Gruppe flew its 10,000th operational sortie. On 25/26 April 1944, it participated in a 137-aircraft attack on Portsmouth Harbour, and on the following night, bombed Bristol. In mid-May, it was withdrawn from Steinbock operations, having lost two-thirds of its aircraft.

The Geschwader lost a total of 70 aircraft out of 110 during the operation.

=== Normandy ===
I. Gruppe flew missions over the Allied beachheads and French estuaries on 7, 10, 11, 13, 15, 20, 21, 24 and 29 June. Losses were heavy. At dawn on 7 July 1944, a force of 91 bombers sent out by IX. Fliegerkorps bombed ships off the beaches. Five ships were reportedly hit by III. Gruppe. This was repeated on 9 July. Mine-laying and ground attack missions were also flown. By September, fuel shortages meant that the group was no longer operational. On 23 November 1944, after withdrawing into Germany, it was redesignated as fighter unit I. KG 6 (J) (Jagd or Fighter). II. Gruppe flew missions throughout June, July and August 1944. It gradually withdrew into the Netherlands in late August and Germany in September. III. Gruppe flew missions in support of Heer and Waffen SS units in France. It flew sorties in the Orne estuary on the night of 6/7 June and 8, 9, 10, 13, 15, 16, 18, 19 and 20 June 1944. The Gruppe moved to Villaroche and Ahlhorn on 2 July. Fuel shortages forced the group to abandon operations. It was ordered to retrain as a fighter aircraft unit on 23 November and was renamed III./KG 6 (J).

== Commanding officers ==
- Oberstleutnant Walter Storp, 1 September 1942 – 11 September 1943
- Oberstleutnant Hermann Hogeback, 11 September 1943 – 8 May 1945
