= 5th Air Division (Germany) =

WW2 German Luftwaffe formation

Flag of a commander of an Air Division

5. Flieger Division (5th Air Division) was one of the primary divisions of the German Luftwaffe in World War II. It was formed on 1 August 1938 in Braunschweig from the Höheren Fliegerkommandeur 7. The division was redesignated 31. Flieger-Division on 1 November 1938 and was renamed 5. Flieger Division again on 1 February 1939. The division was redesignated V. Fliegerkorps on 11 October 1939 and reformed again on 19 December 1944.

The new 5th Air Division was formed in Trondheim, Norway, from the office of the Air Commander 5. It was subordinate to the Commanding General of the German Luftwaffe in Norway (Ernst-August Roth) before being disbanded on 8 May 1945 following the unconditional surrender of the Wehrmacht.

== Commanding officers ==
- General Ludwig Wolff, 1 August 1938 – 31 January 1939
- Generalfeldmarschall Robert Ritter von Greim, 1 September 1939 – 11 October 1939
- Oberst Dr. Ernst Kühl, 19 December 1944 – 31 January 1945
- Generalmajor Walter Storp, 31 January 1945 – 8 May 1945
  - 1st General Staff Officer and Chief of Operations (Ia) Major / Lieutenant Colonel Horst Erwin Walther Freiherr Treusch von Buttlar-Brandenfels (1911–1974)
