= Robert Ritter von Greim =

German field marshal (1892–1945)

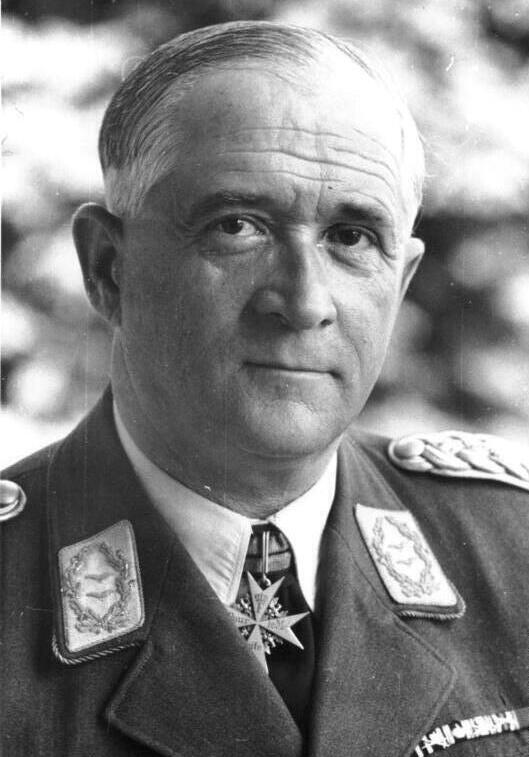
- Greim in 1940

Chief of the Luftwaffe High Command
- In office 26 April 1945 – 8 May 1945
- Preceded by: Hermann Göring
- Succeeded by: Office abolished

1st Inspector of Fighters
- In office 1 August 1935 – 20 April 1936
- Preceded by: Office established
- Succeeded by: Bruno Loerzer

Personal details
- Born: Robert Greim; 22 June 1892 Bayreuth, Kingdom of Bavaria, German Empire
- Died: 24 May 1945 (aged 52) Salzburg, Allied-occupied Austria
- Cause of death: Suicide
- Resting place: Salzburger Kommunalfriedhof

Military service
- Allegiance: German Empire; Nazi Germany
- Branch/service: Imperial German Army; Bavarian Army; Luftstreitkräfte; Luftwaffe
- Years of service: 1911–1918; 1934–1945
- Rank: Generalfeldmarschall
- Battles/wars: World War I; World War II; Battle of Britain; Operation Barbarossa; Case Blue; Battle of Kursk; Operation Citadel; Operation Kutuzov; Battle of Berlin
- Awards: Knight's Cross of the Iron Cross with Oak Leaves and Swords; Pour le Mérite; Military Order of Max Joseph

Robert Ritter von Greim (born Robert Greim; 22 June 1892 – 24 May 1945) was a German Generalfeldmarschall (Field marshal) and First World War flying ace. In April 1945, in the last days of World War II in Europe, Adolf Hitler appointed Greim commander-in-chief of the Luftwaffe (German air force) after Hermann Göring had been dismissed for treason. He was the last person to have been promoted to field marshal in the German armed forces. After the surrender of Nazi Germany in May 1945, Greim was captured by the Allies. He committed suicide in an American-controlled prison on 24 May 1945.

== Early life and career ==
He was born as Robert Greim on 22 June 1892 in Bayreuth in the Kingdom of Bavaria, a state of the German Empire, the second son of police Hauptmann Ludwig Greim and his wife Marie. Greim had an older brother Ludwig, named after his father, born 5 October 1888, and a younger sister Marie Barbara born 11 January 1911. From 18 September 1906 to 6 July 1911, Greim attended the Bavarian Cadet Corps (Bayerisches Kadettenkorps) on the Marsfeld in Munich and graduated with his Abitur (university entry qualification).

Greim joined the Bavarian Army on 14 July 1911. During his officer training, he was posted to the Royal Bavarian 8th Field Artillery Regiment "Prinz Heinrich von Preußen" (Königlich Bayerisches 8. Feldartillerie-Regiment „Prinz Heinrich von Preußen“), a field artillery regiment of the 6th Royal Bavarian Division on 25 February 1913. Greim received his officer training at the War Academy (Bayerische Kriegsakademie) in Munich. On 28 October 1913, Greim was commissioned as a Leutnant (second lieutenant). In April 1914, he received the Bavarian Military Merit Order 4th Class (Militärverdienstorden des Königreichs Bayern 4. Klasse) for service with the ammunition column of 1st battalion of his 8th Field Artillery Regiment.

== World War I ==
When World War I started in August 1914, Greim's regiment was subordinated to the 6th Army under its commander-in-chief Generaloberst Rupprecht, Crown Prince of Bavaria. Greim, who commanded a battery during the Battle of Lorraine, distinguished himself on 25 August in the fighting near Maixe-Deuxville. The 8th Field Artillery Regiment stayed in the combat area of Nancy until 24 September and then relocated to Saint-Mihiel. During combat in the Bois d'Ailly (Ailly Wood), Greim earned the Iron Cross 2nd Class (Eisernes Kreuz 2. Klasse) in November 1914. On 9 March 1915, Greim became an adjutant with the 1st battalion of the 8th Field Artillery Regiment. That day, he made his maiden flight as a passenger. The flight took him across the front between Saint-Mihiel and Flirey and then to the northern outskirts of Toul, approximately 15 kilometers (9.3 miles) behind enemy lines where Greim observed the 26 French artillery positions between Saint-Mihiel and Pont-à-Mousson. During this aerial reconnaissance flight, Greim took detailed notes of his observations. On 10 August, Greim began his training as an aerial observer with the Feldflieger Abteilung 3b (FFA 3b—Field Flying Company 3b).

=== With the German Air Service ===
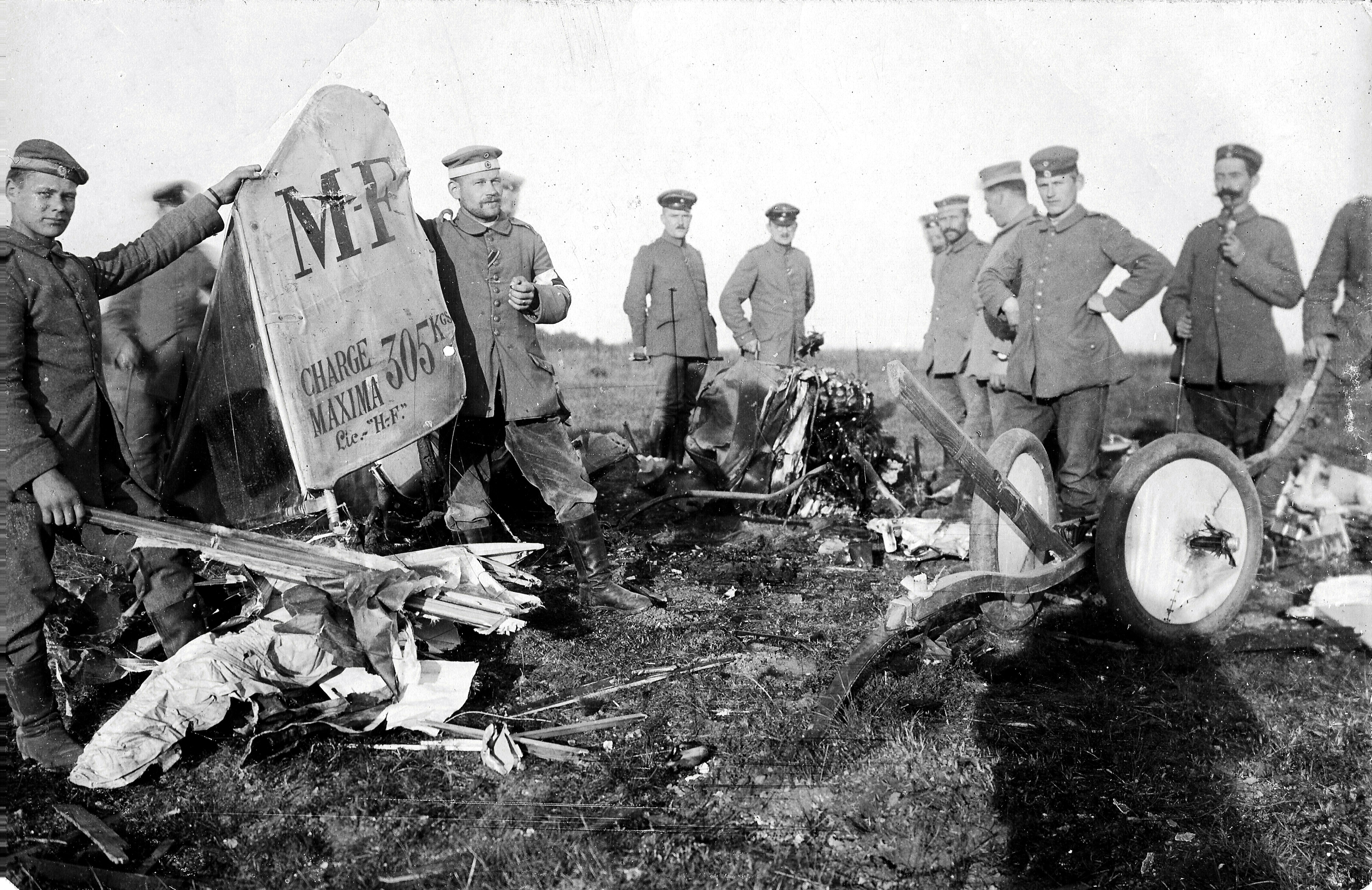
The remains of the first aircraft shot down by Greim on 10 October 1915

On 10 October 1915, while flying as an aerial observer on a Albatros C.I, Greim shot down a Farman MF.11 from French Escadrille Spa.69. The Farman crashed near Deuxnouds, killing Sergeant Henri Mahien and Lieutenant Henri Mérillion. On 16 October, Hauptmann Hermann Pohl, the commanding officer of FFA 3b, sent a telegram to the III Royal Bavarian Corps (III. Königlich Bayerisches Armee-Korps), requesting Greim's official transfer to the FFA 3b. The request was approved on 28 October and Greim became a member of the Luftstreitkräfte (German Air Service).

On 22 June 1916, Greim's pilot Unteroffizier Alois Hosp died of wounds in a field hospital. He was shot down and wounded by Sous-Lieutenant Charles Nungesser. On 3 August, Greim was transferred to the Artillerieflieger-Abteilung 204 (AFA 204—Artillery Flying Company 204) which was based at an airfield near Ruyaulcourt.

He also served with AFA 204 over the Somme. Greim was promoted to Oberleutnant (First Lieutenant) on 17 January 1917. After undergoing pilot training, Greim joined FA 46b on 22 February 1917.

=== As a fighter pilot ===
He transferred to Jagdstaffel 34 (Jasta 34—34th Fighter Squadron) in April 1917. He scored an aerial victory on 25 May 1917, and on the same day he received the Iron Cross 1st Class (Eisernes Kreuz 1. Klasse).

On 19 June, he was given command of Jasta 34. Greim became an ace on 16 August 1917, when he shot down a Sopwith 1½ Strutter. By 16 October, his victory tally totaled seven. There was a lull in his successes until February 1918. On the 11th, he had an unconfirmed victory and on the 18th he claimed aerial victory number eight.

On 21 March 1918, the day of his ninth credited victory, Greim became Commanding Officer of Jagdgruppe 10. He flew with them until at least 18 June, when he notched up his 15th success. On 27 June 1918, while Greim was engaging a Bristol Fighter, his aircraft lost its cowling. The departing cowling damaged his top wing, along with the lower left interplane strut, but Greim managed to land the machine successfully. By 7 August 1918 he was commanding Jagdgruppe 9, and scored his 16th victory. On 23 August, he cooperated with Vizefeldwebel Johann Pütz in what was arguably the first successful assault by aircraft on armored tanks. On 27 September, he scored kill number 25 while flying with Jagdgruppe 9.

He returned to Jasta 34 in October 1918. The Jasta had been re-equipped with 'cast-offs' from Richthofen's Flying Circus, Jagdgeschwader I. The new equipment was warmly welcomed as being superior to the older Albatros and Pfalz fighters that they had been previously equipped with. Greim's final three victories came during this time, while he was flying Albatros D.Vs, Fokker Triplanes, and Fokker D.VIIs. By the war's end he had scored 28 victories and had been awarded the Pour le Mérite on 8 October. On 23 November 1920, Greim was also awarded the Bavarian Military Order of Max Joseph (Militär-Max Joseph-Orden), this award made him a knight (Ritter), and allowed him to add both this honorific title and the style 'von' to his name. Thus Robert Greim became Robert Ritter von Greim.

== Interwar period ==
By 1919, Greim had returned to Bavaria and rejoined his regiment (8th Bavarian Artillery) and was discharged from the Reichswehr on 31 March 1920 holding the rank of Hauptmann. He then enrolled at the Ludwig-Maximilians-Universität München (LMU Munich) where he studied jurisprudence and rekindled his relationship with Rudolf Heß. Heß was also a student in Munich and a former pilot during World War I who had occasionally flown under the command of Greim while both their units were based at Gosselies. On 2 September 1920, Greim married Alice Wilhelmine Adelheid Braun, née Landauer. Alice was six years older than Greim and the widow of Leutnant Hanns Braun, a pilot in Greim's unit who was killed in action on 9 October 1918 and an Olympic medalist. On 1 July 1921, their mutual son Hubert was born. Alice had brought two daughters, Gisela and Sascha, into the marriage. Hubert would later marry Johann Raithel's daughter Anneliese.

For 10 months, he ran the air postal station in Munich. This was the key turning point in his career, as in 1920 he flew the up-and-coming German army propaganda instructor Adolf Hitler to Berlin as an observer of the failed Kapp Putsch. Many other people from Hitler's years in Bavaria immediately after World War I also rose to prominence in the Nazi era.

Upon his return to Germany, Greim took part in the 1923 putsch; as a convinced Nazi, he "remained utterly committed to Hitler to the very end of the war".

=== In China ===
In 1924, Greim, together with Richard Walter, Robert Heibert and Werner Charlottenburg, was recruited by the Chiang Kai-shek government to help build a Chinese air force in Canton initially led by Sun Yat-sen. Traveling by ship on the SS Trier, the pilots arrived in Hong Kong on 13 September. The Soviet Union had also sent military advisers to China, among them Vasily Blyukher and Konstantin Rokossovsky whom Greim befriended during his stay in China. Around the turn of the year 1925/26, his wife Alice and son Hubert joined Greim in Canton, making the journey on the SS Coblenz.

In early April 1927, Greim and his family left Canton, taking the Trans–Siberian Railway via Harbin, Moscow and Warsaw, arriving in Munich on 1 May 1927. In Moscow, Greim failed to help a longtime school and war friend, Josef Römer, with establishing contact to the Soviets. Römer, who was a communist and member of the German resistance to Nazism, was later imprisoned in 1934 in the Dachau concentration camp. In 1939, Greim was instrumental in getting Römer released from prison. When Römer was again arrested and tried before the People's Court (Volksgerichtshof) on 19 June 1944, Greim was unable to help further, Römer was sentenced to death and executed on 25 September 1944.

=== Nazism ===
In 1933, Hermann Göring invited Greim to help him to rebuild the German Air Force. He was appointed to command the first fighter pilot school, following the closure of the secret flying school established near the city of Lipetsk in the Soviet Union during the closing days of the Weimar Republic. Germany had been forbidden to have an air force under the terms of the Treaty of Versailles of 1919, so it trained its pilots in secret.

On 1 January 1934, Greim joined the Reichswehr and was promoted to Major (major) that day. Organizationally, he was assigned to both the 7th (Bavarian) Artillery Regiment (7. (Bayerisches) Artillerie-Regiment), which was subordinated to the 7th Division, and to the Flieger-Inspektion 3 (3rd Flyer Inspection) of the Reichsluftfahrtministerium (RLM—Ministry of Aviation). On 1 May, he was given command of I. Gruppe of Jagdgeschwader 132 "Richthofen" (JG 132—132nd Fighter Wing), based in Döberitz, a fighter group named after Manfred von Richthofen. The unit was also known under its cover name Reklamestaffel Mitteldeutschland (Advertisement Squadron Middle Germany). He held this position until 1 April 1935 when he was appointed Inspekteur der Jagdflieger (Inspector of Fighters). Command of I. Gruppe of JG 132 was then passed on to Major Kurt-Bertram von Döring.

On 14 June 1935, Greim visited the Deutsche Forschungsanstalt für Segelflug (German Institute for Glider Research) based at the Griesheim Airfield near Darmstadt. He inspected and tested a prototype glider leading to the development of the DFS 230 transport glider. That day, he for the first time met the then 23 year old test pilot Hanna Reitsch. On 9 September, Greim traveled on LZ 127 Graf Zeppelin to Brazil, arriving in Recife on 12 September. There, together with his former World War I comrade Johann Pütz, they made multiple flights on a Junkers Ju 52 to São Pedro da Aldeia and Santos. The reasons for his journey remain unclear. He returned to Germany on 2 October, arriving at Friedrichshafen Airfiled on LZ 127 Graf Zeppelin.

On 1 February 1938, Greim was promoted to Generalmajor (lit. 'major general'—brigadier general). In 1938, Greim assumed command of the Luftwaffe research department.

== World War II ==
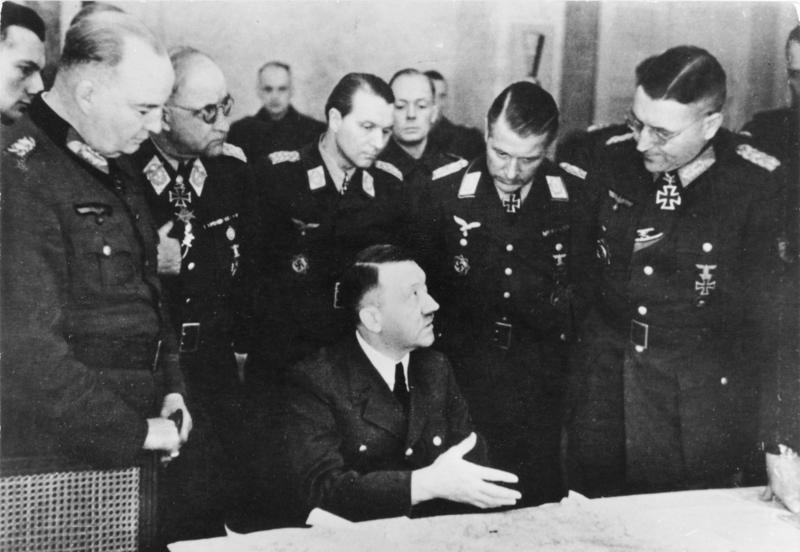
Von Greim second on the left behind Hitler, 1945

After the end of the Polish campaign, von Greim became commander of the 5th Fliegerkorps (5th Air Corps) which participated in the Battle of Britain. Greim was promoted to Generalleutnant (lit. 'lieutenant general'—major general) on 1 January 1940 and to General der Flieger (general of the aviators) on 19 July.

In 1941, on the Eastern Front, his corps split up and renamed Sonderstab Krim. In April 1942 he became commander of Luftwaffenkommando Ost in Smolensk, as his korps replaced the 8th Fliegerkorps in the front area there. In February 1943, von Greim was given command of Luftflotte 6, which continued to support Army Group Centre in its operations. As part of Operation Citadel, von Greim's Luftflotte provided 730 aircraft in July 1943. Due to high losses, by June 1944 only around 50 aircraft were operational.

On 30 December 1942, his son Hubert was taken prisoner of war. Hubert was a fighter pilot in Oberleutnant Julius Meimberg's 11. Staffel of Jagdgeschwader 2 "Richthofen" serving in North Africa. He made a forced landing in his Messerschmitt Bf 109 G-4 trop (Werknummer 16069—factory number) near Tabarka and Aïn Draham when his aircraft had been hit by anti-aircraft artillery.

=== Berlin, April 1945 ===
On 24 April 1945, Oberst Nicolaus von Below implemented Hitler's order and instructed Greim to immediately travel to the Führerbunker in Berlin. At 23:45 that day, Greim called General der Flieger Karl Koller, the Chief of the Luftwaffe General Staff, requesting information about the situation in Berlin. Koller, who had additional information to share, did not want to talk over the phone. At 11:00 on 25 April, Greim and Koller met in person and Greim was informed about the deteriorating situation around Hitler. Greim then picked up Hanna Reitsch from Schloss Leopoldskron before the two took a Junkers Ju 188 from Neubiberg Airfield to Rechlin.

With Berlin encircled by Soviet forces during the Battle of Berlin, Greim flew into Berlin from Rechlin with Reitsch, in response to Hitler's order. Initially they flew from the central Luftwaffe test facility airfield, the Erprobungsstelle Rechlin to Gatow (a district of south-western Berlin) in a Focke-Wulf Fw 190. As the cockpit had room for only the pilot, Reitsch flew in the tail of the plane, getting into it by climbing through a small emergency opening. The flight was escorted by twelve other Fw 190s from Jagdgeschwader 26 under the command of Hauptmann Hans Dortenmann.

Having landed in Gatow, they changed planes to fly to the Chancellery; however, their Fieseler Storch was hit by anti-aircraft fire over the Grunewald. Greim was incapacitated by a bullet in the right foot, but Reitsch was able to reach the throttle and joystick to land on an improvised airstrip in the Tiergarten, near the Brandenburg Gate.

They drove directly to the Führerbunker, where Greim's wound was dressed. Then Hitler promoted Greim from Generaloberst to Generalfeldmarschall (field marshal), making him the last German officer ever to achieve that rank and appointed him as commander-in-chief of the Luftwaffe, to replace Hermann Göring, whom he had recently dismissed in absentia for treason. Greim thus became the second man to command the German Air Force during the Third Reich. However, with the end of the war in Europe fast approaching, his tenure as Oberbefehlshaber der Luftwaffe lasted only a few days.

On 28 April, Hitler ordered Ritter von Greim to leave Berlin and had Reitsch fly him to Plön, so that he could arrest Heinrich Himmler on the charge of treason. That night, the two left Berlin, evading Soviet 3rd Shock Army troops as they took off from the makeshift airstrip in a small Arado Ar 96. In a post-war interview, Reitsch said, "It was the blackest day when we could not die at our Führer's side."

== Death ==
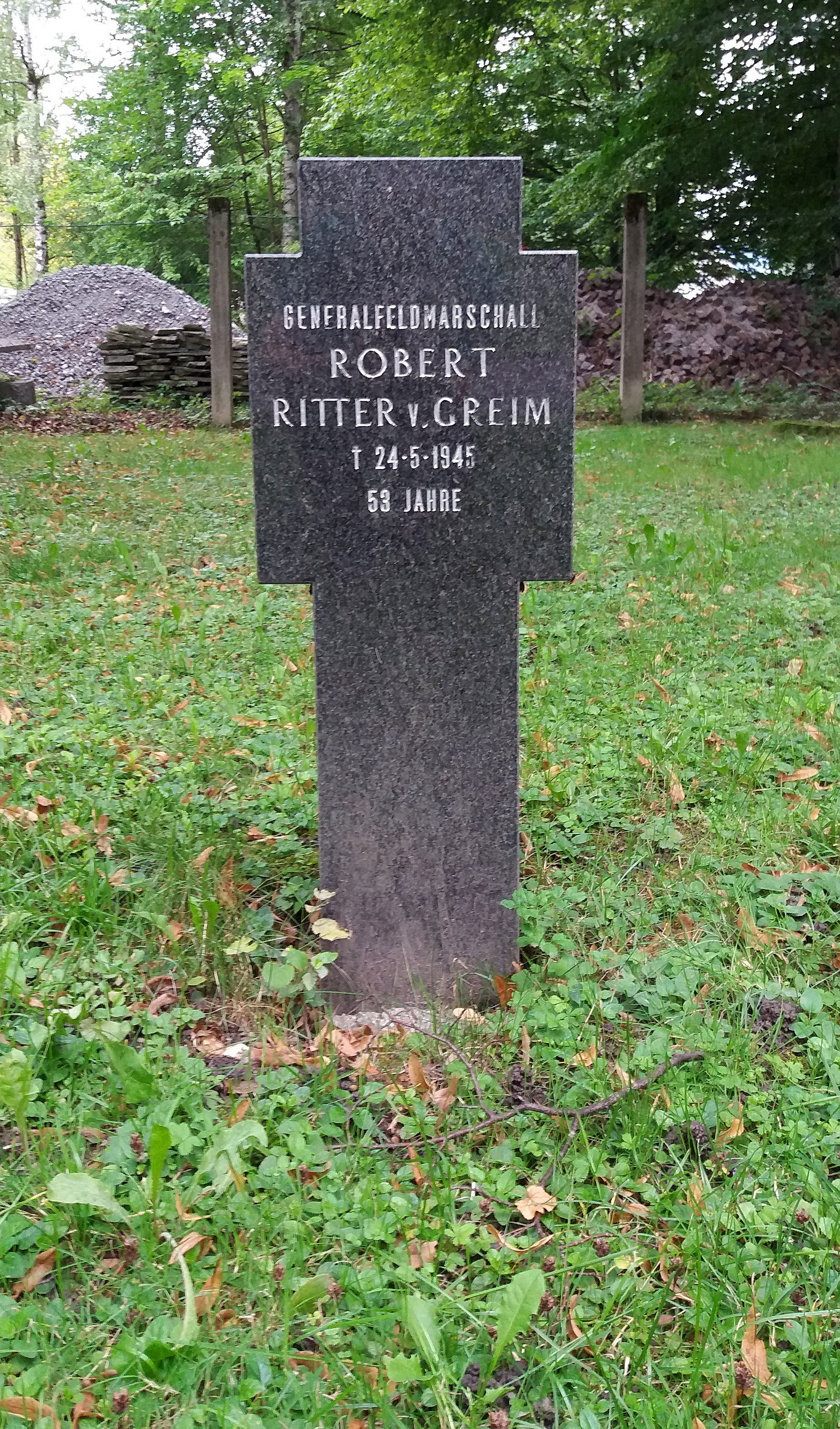
Grave of Field Marshal Robert Ritter von Greim in the Salzburger Kommunalfriedhof

On 8 May, the same day as the surrender of Germany, Greim was captured by American troops in Austria. His initial statement to his captors was reportedly "I am the head of the Luftwaffe, but I have no Luftwaffe". Greim committed suicide in prison in Salzburg on 24 May.

== Awards ==
- Iron Cross (1914)
  - 2nd Class (26 November 1914)
  - 1st Class (10 October 1915)
- Knight's Cross of the Military Order of Max Joseph awarded on 23 November 1920 and backdated to 23 October 1918
- Pour le Mérite (14 October 1918)
- Clasp to the Iron Cross (1939)
  - 2nd Class (21 March 1940)
  - 1st Class (14 May 1940)
- Pilot/Observer Badge in Gold with Diamonds (17 April 1945)
- Knight's Cross of the Iron Cross with Oak Leaves and Swords
  - Knight's Cross on 24 June 1940 as Generalleutnant and commander of V. Flieger-Korps
  - 216th Oak Leaves on 2 April 1943 as Generaloberst and commander of Luftflottenkommando Ost (Luftflotte 6)
  - 92nd Swords on 28 August 1944 as Generaloberst and commander of Luftflotte 6 (Note: According to Scherzer Swords awarded on 27 August 1944.)
- Golden Party Badge of the NSDAP (30 January 1945)

== Notes ==
Military offices
Preceded by Hans-Jürgen Stumpff	Chief of the Luftwaffe Personnel Office; 1 June 1937 – 31 January 1939	Succeeded by Gustav Kastner-Kirdorf
Preceded by General Ludwig Wolff	Commander of 5. Flieger-Division (1938-1939); 1 February 1939 – 11 October 1939	Succeeded by V. Fliegerkorps
Preceded by formed from V. Fliegerkorps	Commander of Luftwaffenkommando Ost; 1 April 1942 – 6 May 1943	Succeeded by redesignated Luftflotte 6
Preceded by none	Commander of Luftflotte 6; 5 May 1943 – 24 April 1945	Succeeded by Generaloberst Otto Deßloch
Preceded by Hermann Göring	Commander-in-Chief of the Luftwaffe; 26 April 1945 - 8 May 1945	Germany defeated
