= Ludwig Wolff (general, born 1886) =

German Luftwaffe general (1886–1950)

General der Flieger Ludwig Wolff
- Born: 31 August 1886; Sélestat, Alsace-Lorraine, German Empire
- Died: 17 May 1950 (aged 63) Neustadt in Holstein
- Allegiance: Kingdom of Prussia; Weimar Republic; Nazi Germany
- Branch: Luftwaffe
- Service years: 1904–1948
- Rank: General der Flieger
- Commands: 5th Air Division (Germany); Luftgau XI

Ludwig Wolff (31 August 1886, Sélestat – 17 May 1950, Neustadt in Holstein) was a German General der Flieger in the Luftwaffe during World War II.

== Life ==
=== Early years and World War ===
On 24 May 1904 Wolff joined the 2. Ober-Elsässiches Infanterie-Regiment Nr. 171 of the Prussian army a. During the First World War, he initially served as a company commander, and later until 27 October 1916 as regimental adjutant. Then until 25 February 1917, Wolff served on the staff of the Chief of the field railways. On 26 February 1918 he was reassigned to the staff of the 5th Guards Infantry Division, where he remained until 19 July 1917. Then acted Wolff of 20 July 1917 to 2 September 1917 in the first staff of the German military missions in the Ottoman Empire and until 30 April 1918 Chief of General Staff of the Turkish Army 8th.

In May 1918 he returned to Germany and was held by the end of this month for use in Chief of the General Staff of the Army. On 31 May 1918 Wolff transferred to the staff of the Army High Command 2, where he remained until the beginning of July 1918. This was followed on 4 July 1918, the end of the war and until 3 January 1919 to be serve on the staff of the Army High Command 4. On 4 January 1919 Wolff returned, now promoted to captain, to the 2nd Upper Alsace Infantry Regiment Nr. 171 back, where he remained until his demobilization remained late January 1919.

=== Reichswehr ===
During the Weimar Republic Wolff was first from 22 January to the end of September 1919 at the General Staff of the V. Army Corps used. He was subsequently used by 14 February 1920 the General Staff of the Military District Command IV and VI. Following Wolff served until the end of May 1920 Staff of the Reichswehr Cavalry Brigade 31 and then to the end of June 1922 of the General Staff . 6 Division. From 1 July 1922 until the end of April 1924, he worked as an advisor in the Ministry of Defense .

On 1 May 1924 Wolff became a company commander in the 9th (Prussian) Infantry Regiment appointed whose fortunes he led until the end of January 1927. He then worked until the end of September in 1930 in the General Staff of group commands 2, from October 1930 to the end of September 1933 the staff of Artillery Leader I, and from 1 October 1933 to the end of February 1934 the Staff of the 11th (Saxon) Infantry Regiment used.

=== Wehrmacht ===
On 1 March 1934 Wolff joined the nascent air force and was under construction there at first by the end of this month in the Ministry of Aviation incorporated. On 1 April 1934 he was appointed chief of staff of the air circuit commands V, which post he held until the end of September 1937. He was from 1 November 1936 at the same time deputy commander of the atmosphere V. Then he was from 1 October 1937 to the end of June 1938 Higher flier commander 5 and thereafter from 1 July 1938 to 31 March 1939 the commander 5 Air Division.

=== World War II ===
Wolff has held only one function from 1 April 1939 until the war ended. He acted as Commanding General and Commander-in Luftgau XI with headquarters in Hannover, which is March 1940 in Hamburg and was awarded in his name to honor Shield Luftgau XI. He was the successor of Max Mohr (a former subordinate of Wolff), who had held that position before him. Wolff came with his staff on 3 May 1945 in Hamburg in British captivity, from which he was released in February 1948.

== Awards ==
- Iron Cross 1st Class (1914)
- Iron Cross 2nd Class (1914)
- Knight's Cross with Swords of Royal House Order of Hohenzollern
- Military Merit Cross 3rd Class with War Decoration
- Silver Liakat Medal with Swords
- Gallipoli Star
- Clasp to the Iron Cross (1939) 1st Class
- Clasp to the Iron Cross (1939) 2nd Class
- Anti-Aircraft Flak Battle Badge
- Observer Badge
- War Merit Cross 1st Class with Swords
- War Merit Cross 2nd Class with Swords
- Knight's Cross of the War Merit Cross with Swords on September 27, 1943 as General der Flieger
