= 5th Air Corps =

V. Fliegerkorps German 5th Air Corps
- Flag of a commanding general of a Fliegerkorps
- Active: 11 October 1939 – April 1942
- Country: Nazi Germany
- Branch: Luftwaffe
- Size: Corps

Commanders
- Notable commanders: Robert Ritter von Greim

5th Air Corps (V. Fliegerkorps) was formed 11 October 1939 in Gersthofen from the 5th Air Division. The Corps was transferred to Brussels on 30 November 1941 with the intention to transform it into a mine laying corps. The plan was abandoned and half of the Staff was transferred to Mariupol in December 1941 and was renamed Sonderstab Krim (Special Staff Crimea). The other half was transferred to Smolensk and formed the Luftwaffenkommando Ost in April 1942.

== Commanding officers ==
- Generalfeldmarschall Robert Ritter von Greim, 11 October 1939 – 31 March 1942
