= Buckriders =

Gang from folklore

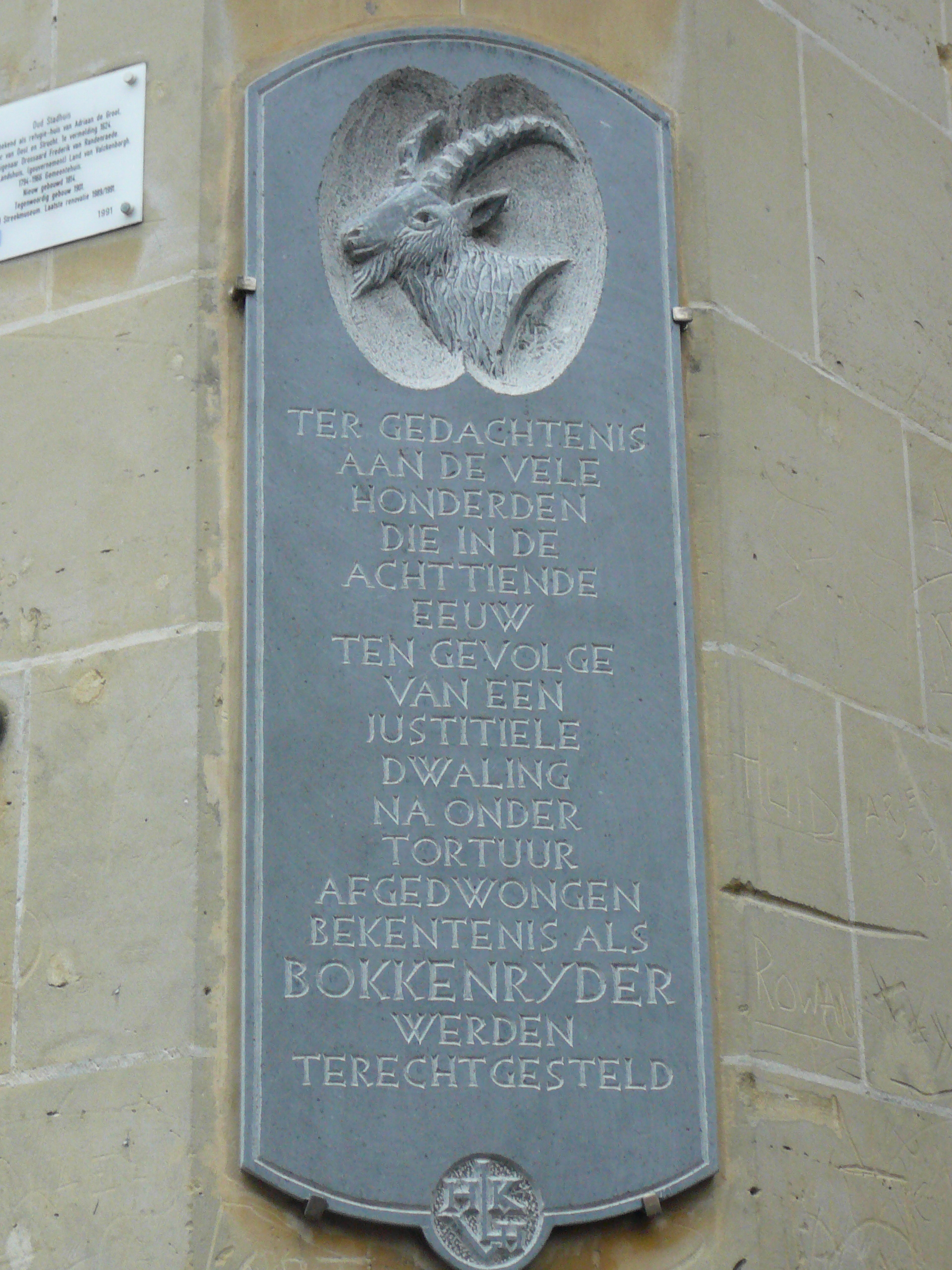
Plaque at the former town hall of Valkenburg

The Buckriders (Dutch: Bokkenrijders; French: Chevaliers du bouc) are a part of South-Eastern Dutch and North-Eastern Belgian folklore. They are witches, who rode through the sky on the back of flying bucks provided to them by the Devil to rob and murder common people and church possessions. The trials against the buckriders differed from 'ordinary' criminal proceedings because in many cases a so-called 'ungodly oath' was involved ("I renounce God and swear submission to the Devil"). Once a year, they would visit their master, the Devil, on the Mook Heath.

Throughout the 18th century, groups of thieves and other criminals adopted the belief to frighten the inhabitants of southern Limburg, a province in the southern part of the Netherlands and in parts of what has become since eastern Belgium. Using the name "Bokkenrijders" (buckriders), these criminal bands launched raids across a region that included Limburg, and parts of modern-day Germany. In response to the robberies towns in Limburg started to build defences like moats around them and farms started to develop a closed square building style.

The buckriders were feared and despised by the common people throughout the area because of the ruthlessness and violence the robberies were committed by. The belief existed that the buckriders could travel fast and vast distances through the skies to rob in a widespread area and be home before dawn to remain obscured in their crimes. Commonly, the buckriders raided small communities, parsonages, churches and more remote farms. Hundreds of buckriders were convicted and sentenced to death.

Because of the link to the occult and witchcraft, authorities accused a large number of potentially innocent men of being buckriders and the majority of suspects were tortured and subsequently convicted of crimes they initially denied having committed. The buckriders were considered both criminals and witches that made a pact with the devil. The witch trials and robbery trials can not be seen separately in that sense: the accusations always included both robbery and witchcraft.

It is estimated that about 1200 men were accused and at least between 425 and 468 men were executed between 1743 and 1796 on the conviction of being a Buckrider. The number of deaths might surpass 500 men due to suspects dying under torture when questioned.

== Etymology ==
Formally, the name Bokkenrijders (buckriders) was first publicly used in 1774, during the "trial of Wellen", a town in what belonged then to the Southern Netherlands. Johan van Muysen slid a letter underneath the door of a farmer called Wouters. The letter contained a threat that Wouters's house would be burned down unless he paid up. Van Muyses claimed to be member of the buckriders and used the word Satan up to three times. In the trial of Wellen, the term "buckriders" is openly used against Philip Mertens, who wrote a similar threat letter.'

== History ==
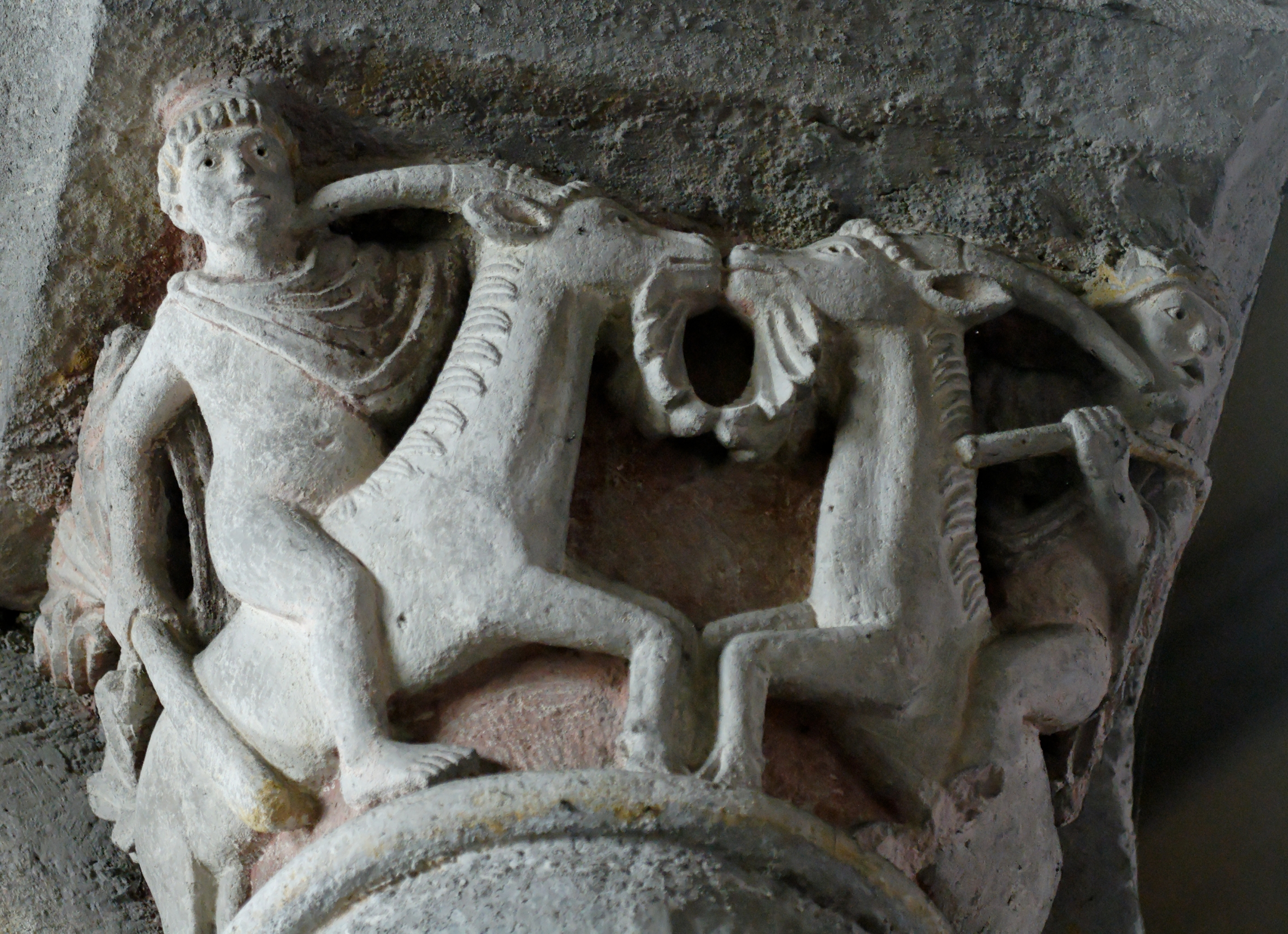
Buckriders on a 12th-century capital in the Abbey church of Moissac

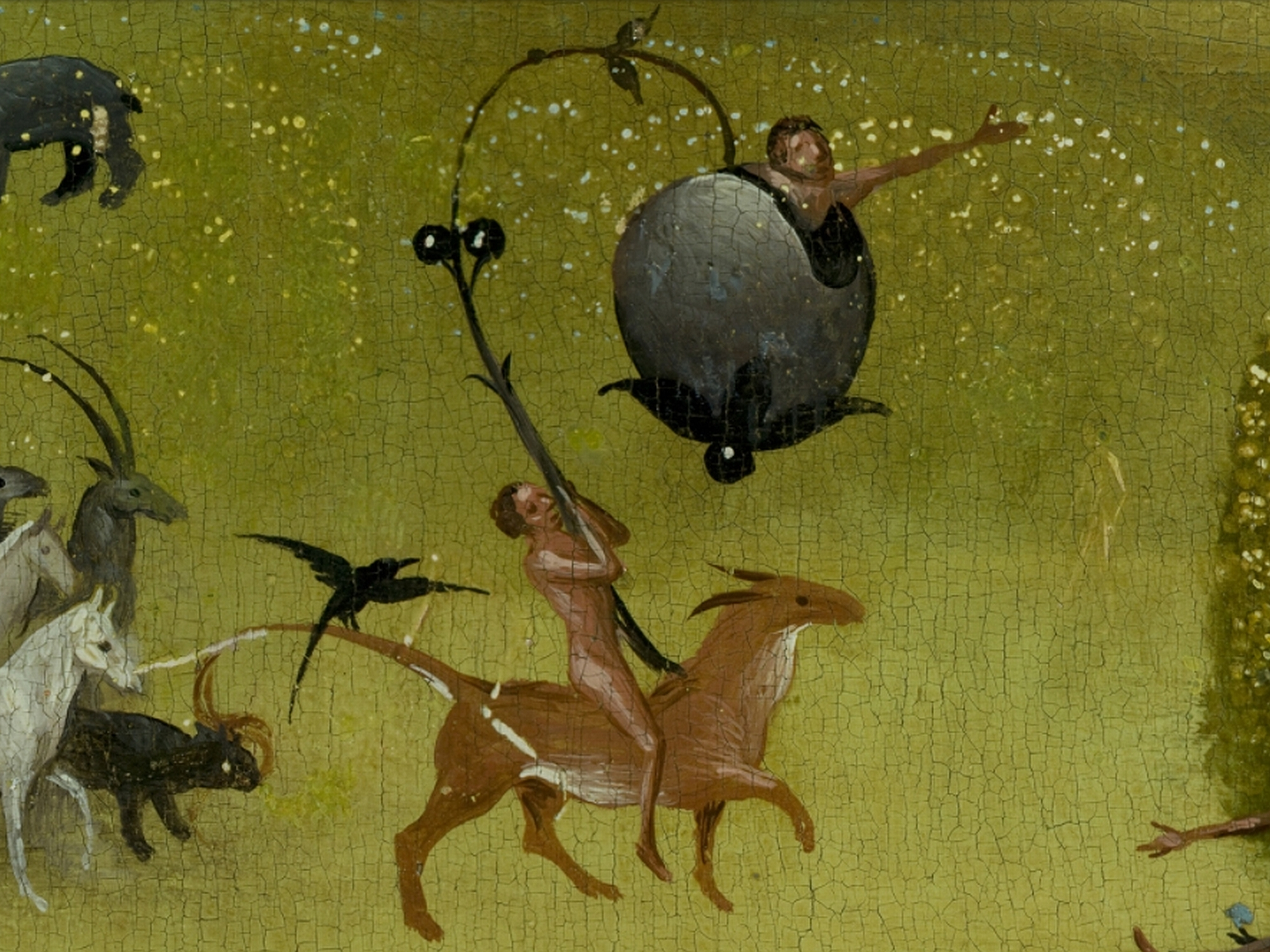
A Buckrider depicted on Jheronimus Bosch' The Garden of Earthly Delights, ca. 1485

Earliest records mentioning the buckriders originate from a tome called Oorzaeke, bewys en ondekkinge van een goddelooze, bezwoorne bende nagtdieven en knevelaers binnen de landen van Overmaeze en aenpalende landstreeken, which approximately translates to Causes, proof and discovery of a godless, averted gang of night thieves and gaggers within the lands of 'Overmaas' and adjacent regions.

This book was written in 1779 by S.J.P. Sleinada (real name Pastor A. Daniels). This pastor, who lived in Landgraaf, knew several buckriders personally. The author tells us that these robbers made a pact with the Devil and rode their bucks at night. The common people told stories about them flying through the sky, pronouncing the following spell: "Over huis, over tuin, over staak, en dat tot Keulen in de wijnkelder!" (lit. 'Across houses, across gardens, across stakes [fences], even to Cologne into the wine cellar!').

Both worshiping and riding a goat have been associated with the Witches' Sabbath and other devilish practices for centuries. According to old folk tales, people who had made a pact with the devil moved at night on bucks.

The present interpretation is that a number of criminal gangs robbed houses and committed other crimes, using the myth to their advantage. Also, many of the buckriders that were arrested are thought to be innocent, as confessions were obtained through torture. The condemnation of people because of an impious oath or their alleged alliance with the devil can be compared to the witch trials in Europe between 1450 and 1750 with brutal persecutions.

In the Overmaasse trials the term "buckriders" is only mentioned late, probably under the influence of the trial in Wellen. The word "buck" does appear here in a lawsuit in 1773. In that trial, Mathijs Smeets from Beek claimed that he and 42 others had sat on large bucks at night and flown to Venlo to commit a robbery there.

In historiography, two opposing observations arise about the buckriders:

- The buckriders are said to consist of a large, wicked gang.
- It could be a (partial) illusion of the judiciary at the time.

The first view is found among those who believed that the buckriders have really formed a large gang and had not yet been punished harshly enough. Critical historians, however, who do not accept the torture statements at face value, consider the punishment exaggerated. The pioneer of this trend, Attorney General Gaspard de Limpens, wrote in 1774 about the convicts: "Their statements are full of contradictions, varying versions and violations of logic and the laws of gravity." "They have been punished too harshly and the majority are innocent." "The torture makes those questioned confess what the justice system wants to hear."

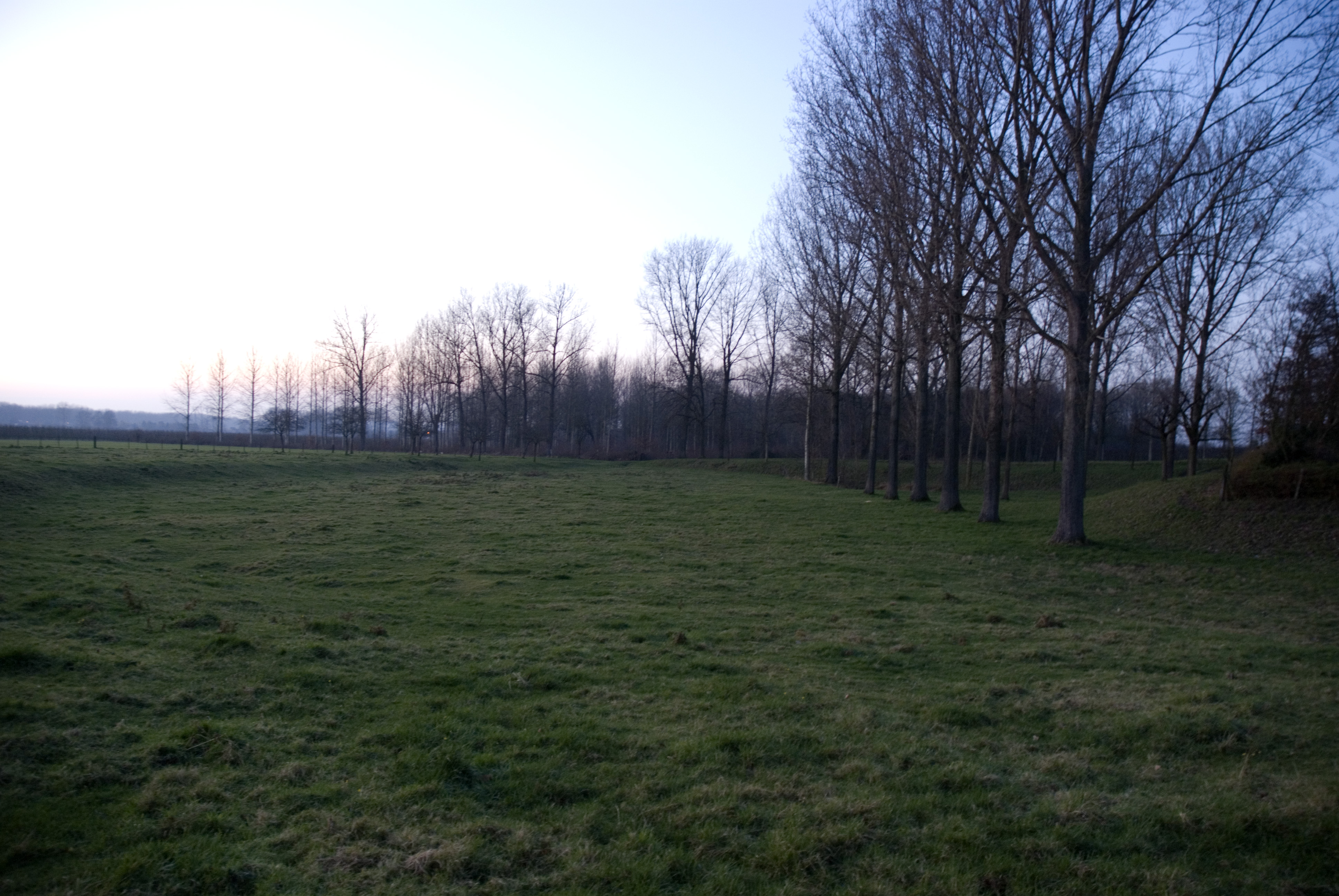
De Bonderkuil in Wellen where nineteen buckriders were executed in 1776

== Buckriders and witch-hunts ==
The fact that the buckriders were tried and prosecuted for their pact with the devil, resembles the witch-hunts during the Early Modern Period. Historians place these buckrider-hunts alongside other prosecuted 'godless' people: heretics and witches. These kinds of fullscale trials last took place in Limburg.

Limburg was the last European region where such superstitious legal excesses took place en masse.

The witches were a popular belief, but also in the eyes of the justice system witches were a reality. The accused were convicted on the basis of witchcraft as much as the robbery charges and they were in most cases executed when found guilty. It is unclear how many people were involved in the actual robberies and that were convicted for it, but the widespread area and long period of time these occurred suggests many smaller groups. This played into the belief that the buckriders could travel fast and vast distances through the skies to rob in a widespread area.

The trials against the buckriders differed from 'ordinary' criminal proceedings because in many cases a so-called 'ungodly oath' was involved ("I renounce God and swear to the devil"). This impious oath, typical of buckriders in this tradition, is said to have originated in the Lands of Overmaas (according to the trial of Hendrik Becx in Nieuwstadt in 1743) and then spread to Loon.

During the 18th century there were seven buckrider trials. In the Wellen-Haspengouw trial, this is stated in black and white in the court documents. A common question there is: "Aren't you a member of the gang from across the Meuse, the so-called buckriders?" That is why people speak of buckriders in the sense that they are suspects and convicts of massive witch trials conducted in that sense. The witch trials and robbery trials can not seen separately in that sense: the accusations always included both.

== Raids and raiders ==
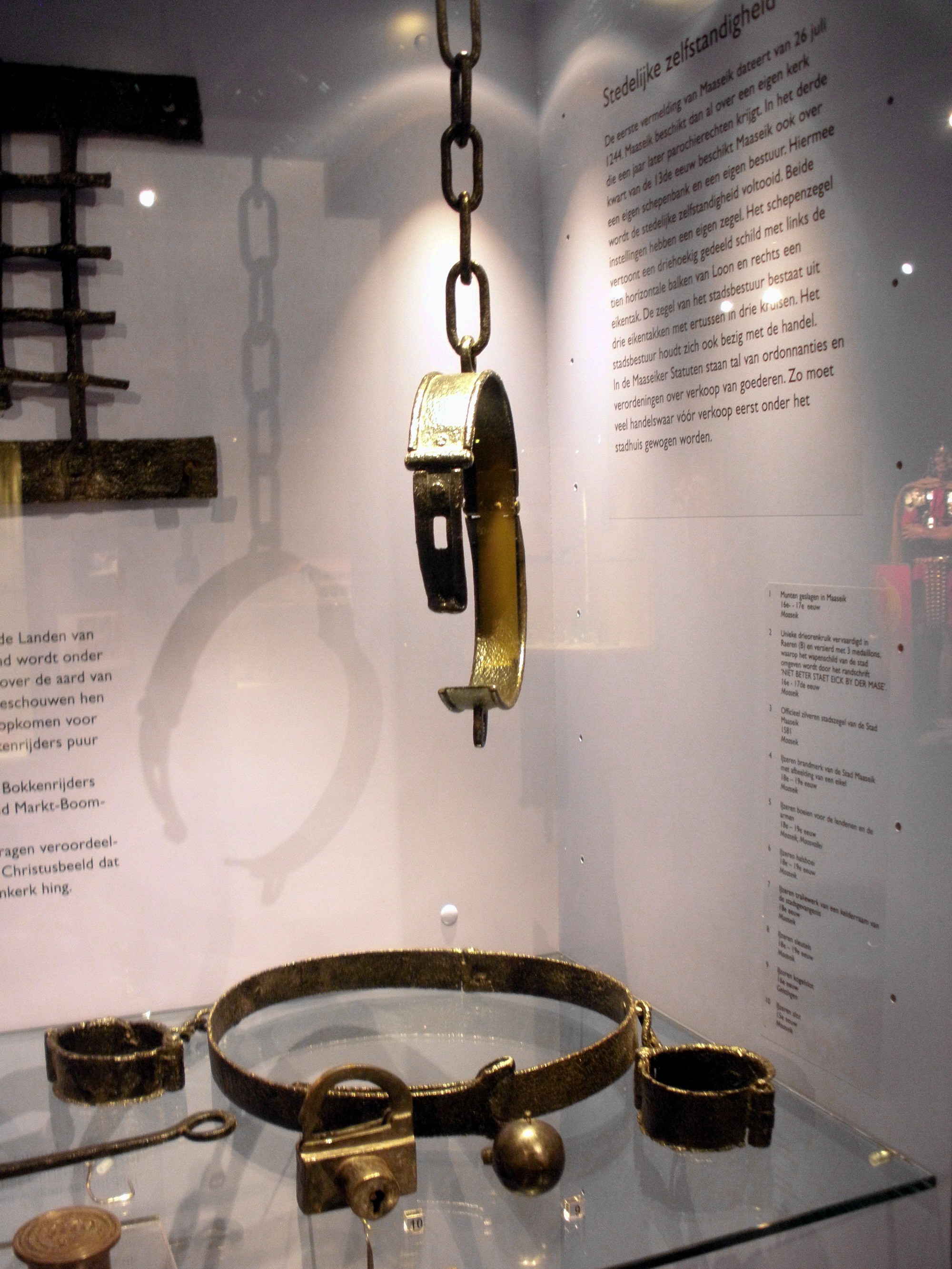
Instruments of torture from the 18th century, Regionaal Archeologisch Museum in Maaseik

Trials against buckriders differed from 'common trials against common criminals' if the suspect had performed the god-denying oath: 'I forswear God ... etc.' This so-called oath of heresy is a stereotypical aspect of the buckriders myth. Since the convicts were accused of this oath and a pact with the devil, we can define this as a late form of witch-hunt.

Prosecution of buckriders were ruthless, even by those day's standards. More than 90% of the convicted received capital punishment. Many confessions were gained by means of torture, or by fear for it.

There are seven periods of different buckrider trials. The first took place during 1743 – 1745, and the last during 1793 – 1794.

Gangleaders	Raiding area	Trial (Year)	Number of gangmembers	
Gangleaders	Raiding area	Trial (Year)	Convicted	Accused
Overmaas				
1. Mathias Ponts	Herzogenrath - Nieuwstadt	1743 - 1745	87	140
2. De Gaverelle and De Preez	Schinnen - Geleen	1749 - 1751	31	45
3. The brothers Kerckhoffs (Balthasar Kirchhoffs and Joseph Kirchhoffs)	Herzogenrath - Valkenburg	1771 - 1776	230	450
Loon				
4. Voortmans - Van Muysen	Wellen - Haspengouw	1774 - 1776	31	350
5. Philip Mertens and Henricus Houben	Ophoven - Geistingen - Maaseik	1785 - 1786	16	45
6. Nolleke van Geleen	Bree - Bocholt - Gruitrode	1789 - 1791	23	60
7. Pelsers and Bollen	Neeroeteren - Maaseik	1793 - 1794	50	80

=== Known associated deaths ===
- Gabriël Brühl – sentenced to death by hanging, 10 September 1743.
- Geerling Daniels – died of two self-inflicted stab wounds, 28 January 1751.
- Joseph Kirchhoffs – sentenced to death by hanging, 11 May 1772.
- Joannes Arnold van de Wal ("Nolleke van Geleen") – sentenced to death by hanging, 21 September 1789.

== Cultural Significance ==
In Limburg, the buckriders are now embraced as part of cultural heritage.

In the 19th century, under the influence of Romanticism, a flood of stories about buckriders emerged, pioneered by the Sittard author Pieter Ecrevisse. As of 2015, more than 1,300 titles have been published on the subject. In the buckrider story, crime is strongly linked to magic and witchcraft. These popular themes resulted in a colorful collection of folk tales, in which the subject has become increasingly distant from historical facts.

In Valkenburg, the buck weeks take place every year in October with various activities, including the bokkemért (buck market) and the Witches' Kitchen is a reminder of the gang of robbers. The buckriders festival takes place in Klimmen each year.

A plaque was installed in 1999 on the facade of the Museum Land van Valkenburg, formerly the town hall of Valkenburg and the scene of the Valkenburg buckrider trials in the 18th century, in memory of the many innocent convicts. The buckriders play a major role in Valkenburg folklore. For example, the residents of the Geul city are referred to as bök ("bucks") during carnival time. In the park at Den Halder Castle there is a bronze statue of a buck that refers to the nickname of residents, not directly to the gang. Since October 2016, there has also been a monument in Klimmen that commemorates the miscarriage of justice where 60 executions took place in five years at the end of the 18th century. In the center of Schaesberg in the municipality of Landgraaf there is a statue of a buckrider, just like in Stein, Sint Joost, Geleen, in Herzogenrath (Germany) and in Maaseik, Wellen and Overpelt (Belgium).

Several carnaval groups are named after the buckriders throughout the affected area.

- The legend is used as the theme for a madhouse attraction called Villa Volta in the amusement park De Efteling.
- The Belgian metal band Ancient Rites released the album Laguz in 2015, containing the song Von Gott Ontfernt (Bij Nacht En Ontij). The content of this song is about the buckriders and portrays them as a group that resisted the secular and ecclesiastical power of that time.

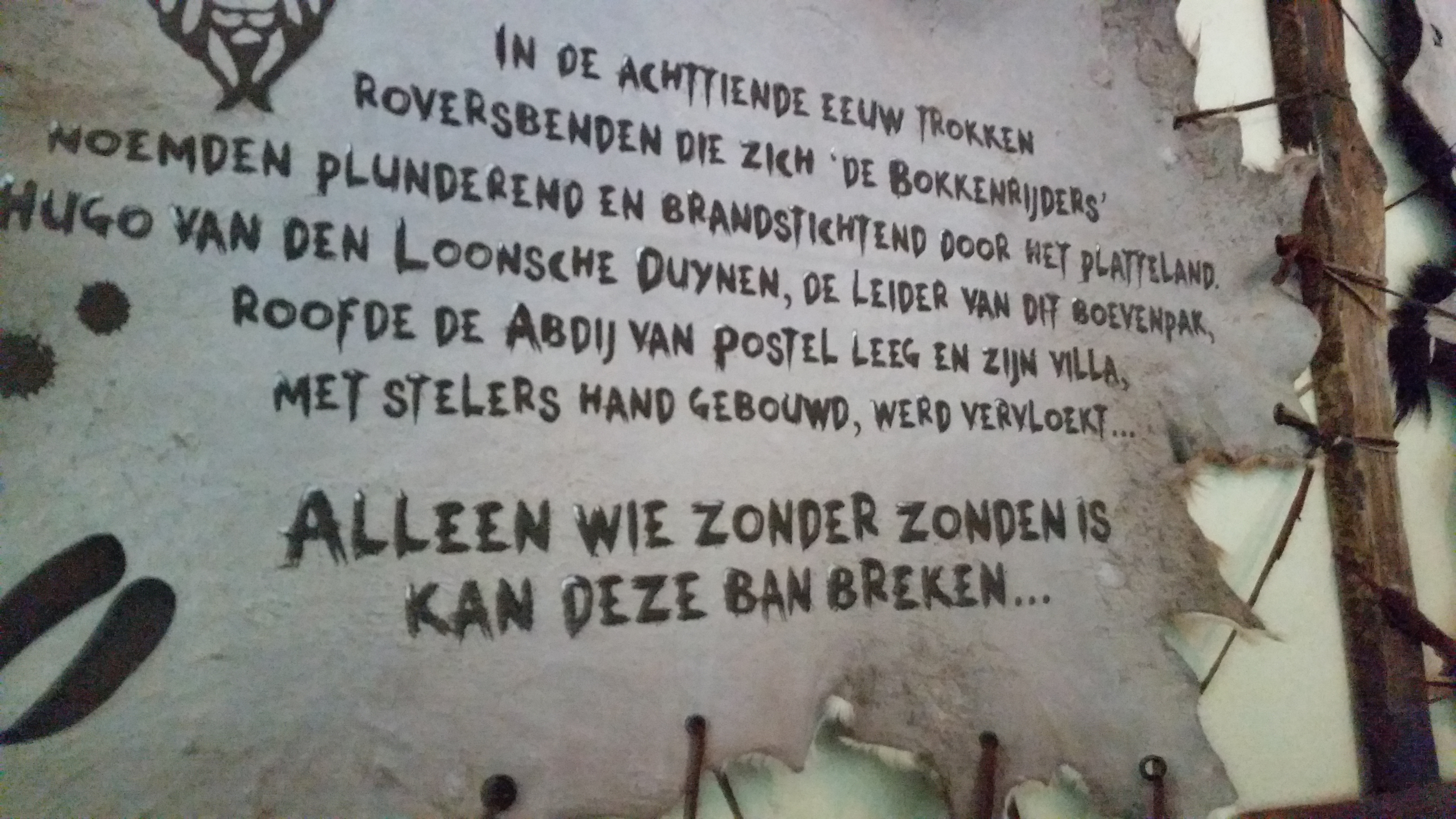
Explanation about buckriders in Villa Volta in the Efteling

- In 1917 Frederik van Eeden wrote the theater play De Bokkenrijder of het Skelet (The Buckrider or the Skeleton).

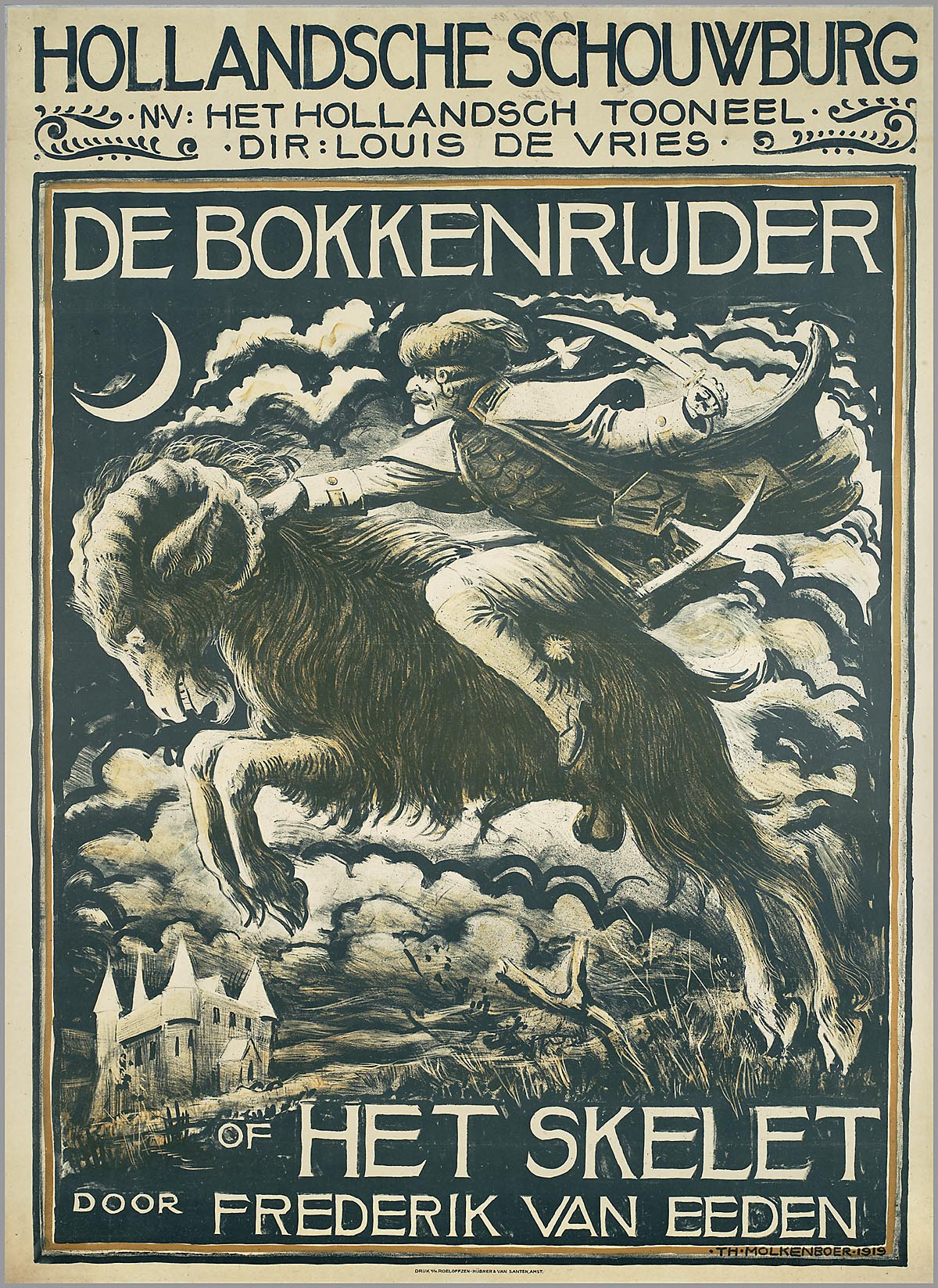
A 1919 poster for Frederik van Eeden's play De Bokkenrijder

- In the 1990s, the youth series De Legende van de Bokkenrijders appeared on Dutch and Flemish television, featuring Gene Bervoets, Joost Prinsen, John Leddy and Bartho Braat. This series is based on books by Ton van Reen, specifically Ontsnapt aan de Galg (1986).
- Composer Rob Goorhuis wrote the music work Innocent Condemned ("Onschuldig veroordeeld"), based on stories about the buckriders.
- Pop group Carboon released the album De Bokkeriejers in 1994 with 15 songs about the gang. The song Bokkeriejersblood (1997) by Schintaler is one of the many other songs written about the bokkenrijders.
- The Belgian production house Het Geluidshuis released an audio story in 2016 titled De Bokrokker. This parody tells the story of a blacksmith in Bokrijk who unsuspectingly joins the buckriders and thus sows death and destruction.
- In the low-budget film Zondebokken (Scapegoats), Maaseik filmmaker Rocky Grispen brings the episode of the buckriders to life. The film premiered in Hasselt on November 16, 2023.
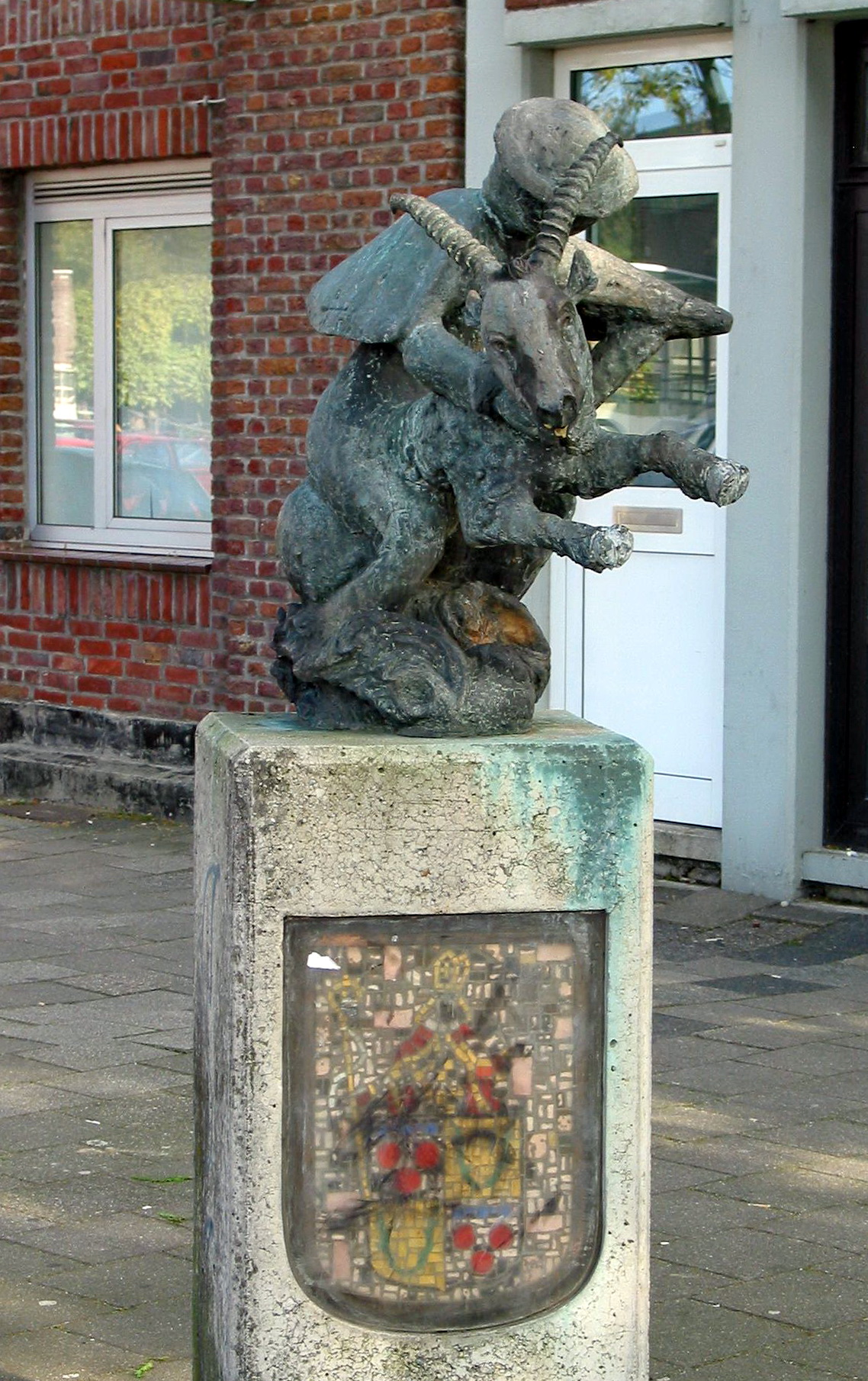
Statue of a buckrider on the marketplace in Schaesberg

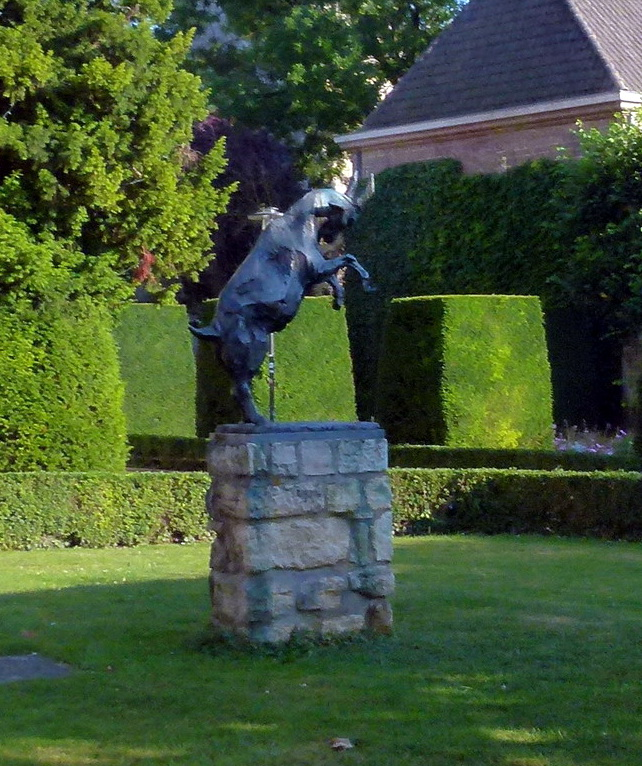
Statue in the Den Halder Park in Valkenburg

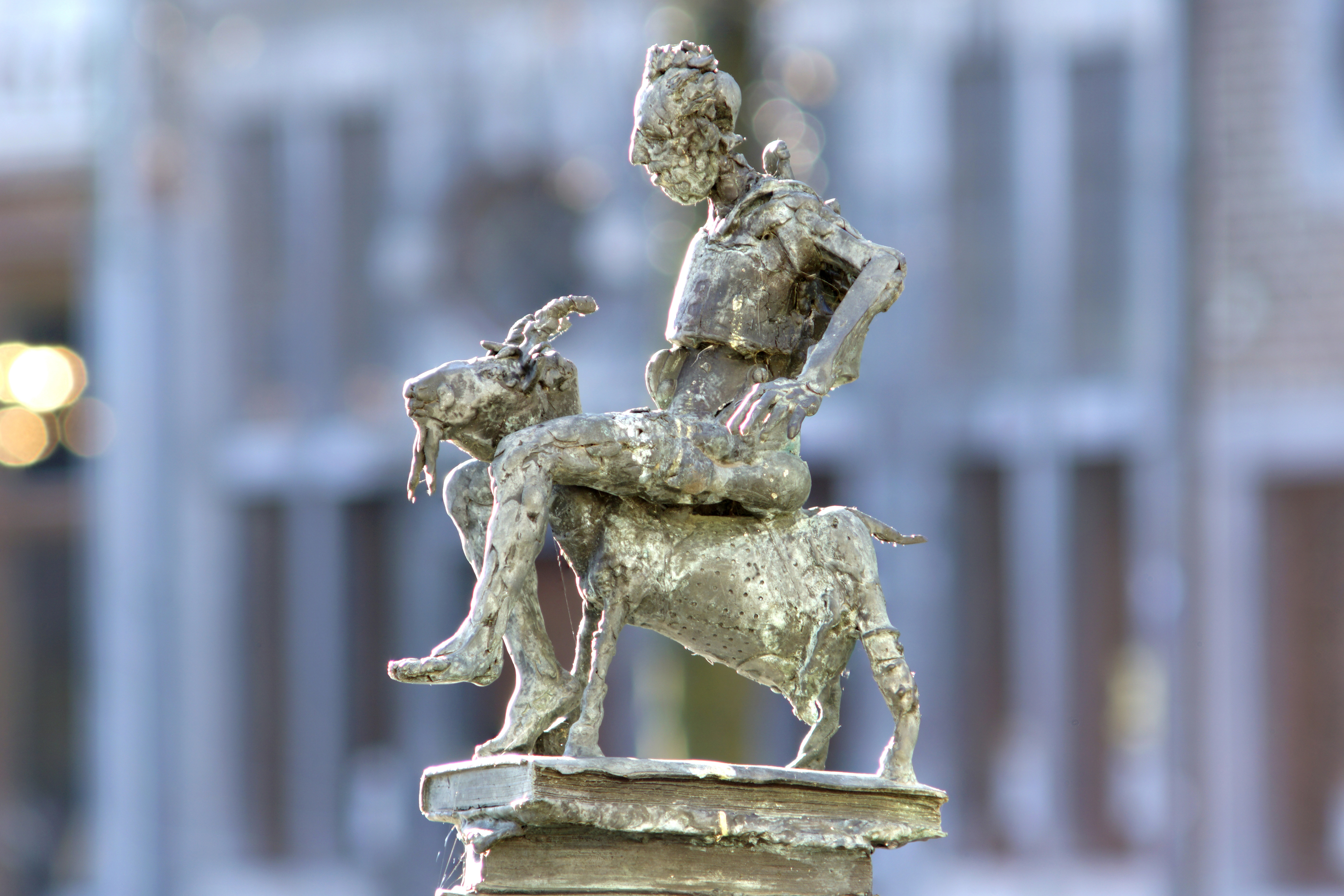
Buckrider in Maaseik

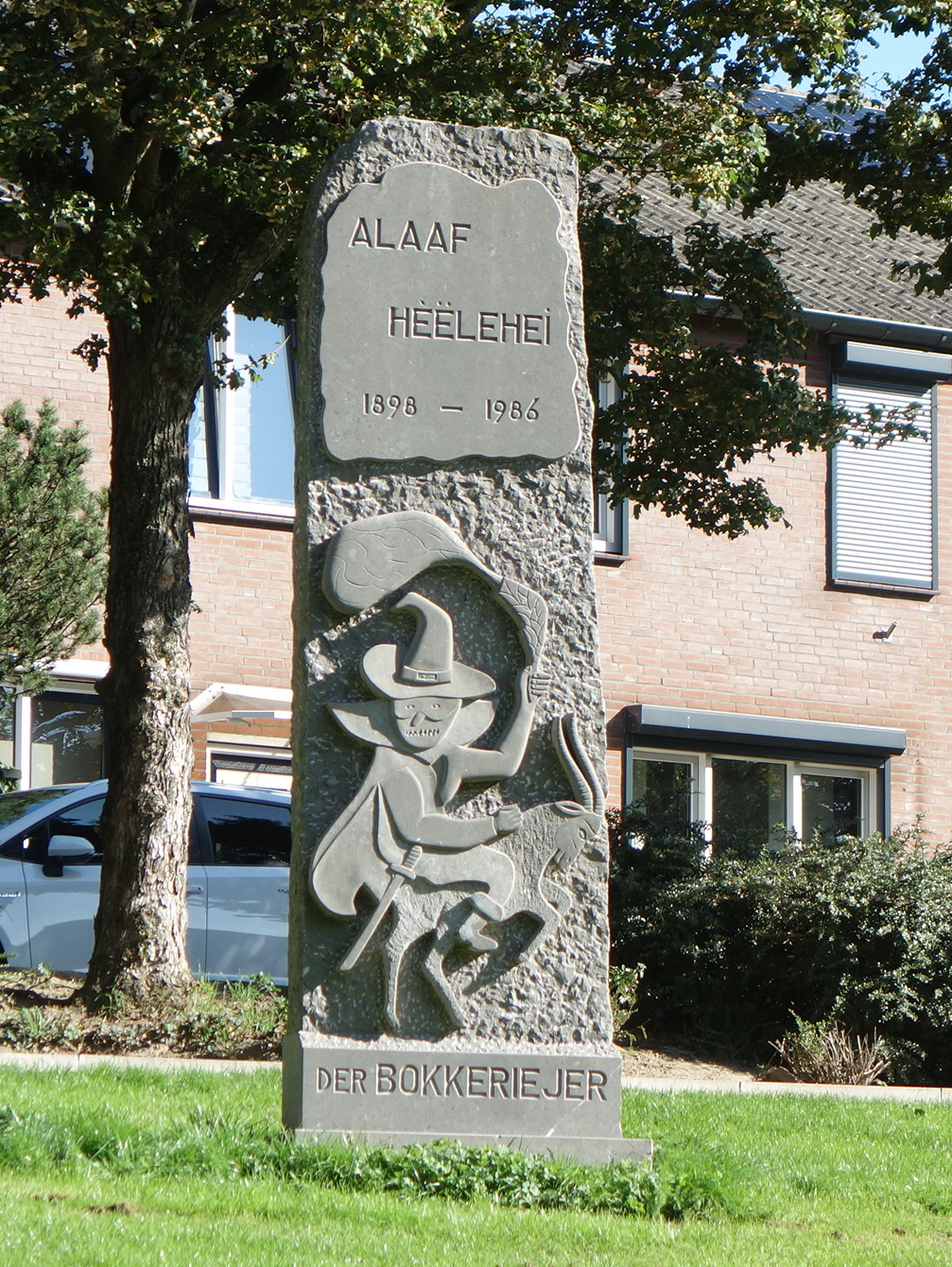
StatueCarnavals Association De Bokkeriejesj in Heerlerheide

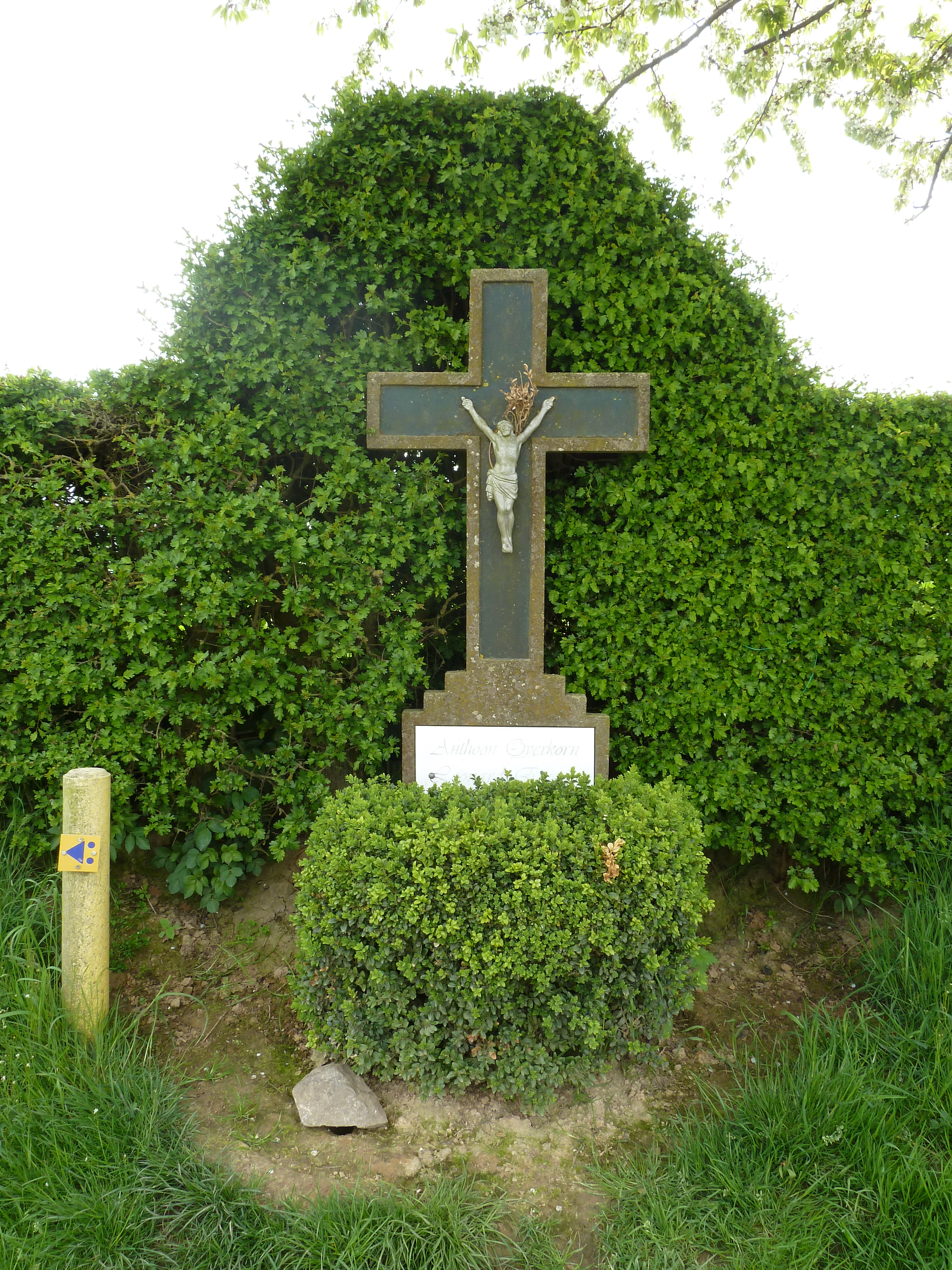
Field cross at the gallows of Margraten on which two alleged buckriders were hanged
