= Fallschirmjäger-Regiment Hübner =

WWII military unit of Nazi Germany

Fallschirmjäger Regiment Hübner
- German propaganda leaflet stating that paratroopers (KG Hübner and KG Müller) are holding a bridgehead west of the Meuse (Maas) near Roermond. The Germans were driven off the westbank in November 1944.
- Active: World War II; August 1944 - March 1945
- Country: Nazi Germany
- Branch: Luftwaffe Ground Unit
- Type: Fallschirmjäger
- Engagements: Battle for the Roer Triangle (Operation Blackcock); Battle for the Rhineland

Commanders
- Notable commanders: Oberstleutnant Friedrich Hübner

Fallschirmjäger Regiment Hübner (or Kampfgruppe Hübner) was formed as a reserve unit in August 1944, attached to 7th Parachute Division in September 1944, and operated as an independent Battle Group from November 1944 until March 1945, when it was formally designated Fallschirmjäger Regiment (FJR) 24 and subordinated to the 8th Parachute Division.

== Organisation ==
FJR Hübner was at full strength and reportedly was able to deploy two field battalions. A third battalion was still under formation and was not ready for combat. Initially, the third battalion was located at Sint Odiliënberg and Melick. The unit's commander, Oberstleutnant Friedrich Hübner, was the same officer who commanded the 2nd Fallschirmjäger Battalion, 5th Fallschirmjäger Regiment, in the Ramcke Parachute Brigade, which fought against the 8th Army in North Africa. He continued service with the German Bundeswehr after the end of the war for several years.

== Operational history ==
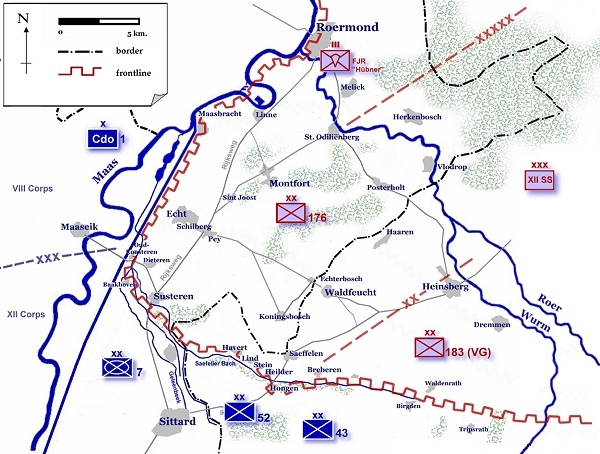
Operation Blackcock, January 1945. Hübner's regiment is shown in the north.

In December 1944 both Kampfgruppe Hübner (at Regiment strength) and Kampfgruppe Müller (at Battalion strength) were sent to Roermond to assist the 176th Infantry Division on the front along the Meuse (Maas). Both Hübner's and Müller's Kampfgruppen were used for training paratroops and were not yet numbered regiments, but rather carried the name of their commander. The correct unit names were "Fallschirmjäger Ersatz und Ausbildungs (paratrooper replacement and training) Regiment Hübner" and "Fallschirmjäger Ersatz Regiment Müller".

During January 1945 the regiment was assigned to the 15th Army, and positioned on the Maas, protecting the northern flank of the XII SS Corps. Elements of FJR Hübner conducted a spirited defense of Sint Joost while under attack from the British 7th Armoured Division during Operation Blackcock, January 19–21, 1945. The efforts of Hübner's men notwithstanding, the British closed in with the support of flame-throwing tanks and seized St. Joost.

During Operation Blackcock, English-speaking Fallschirmjäger of FJR Hübner were organised into a special patrolling section. The forty hand-picked men of this section spoke excellent English and were selected to infiltrate through the allied lines and cause as much trouble as possible. On several occasions during the first half of February the commandos who were holding the line near Linne in the Roer Triangle, were surprised by nightly patrols of this special section.

In February 1945 Hübner's Battle Group was designated Fallschirmjäger Regiment 24 (FJR 24) with the regiment still under the command of Oberstleutnant Hübner. In March 1945, FJR 24 was placed under command of Major Zander. As FJR 24, the regiment fought a delaying action in northwestern Germany, finally surrendering to British forces south of Bremen in April 1945.
