= Bokrijk =

Museum complex in Belgium

Coordinates: 50°58′N 5°25′E

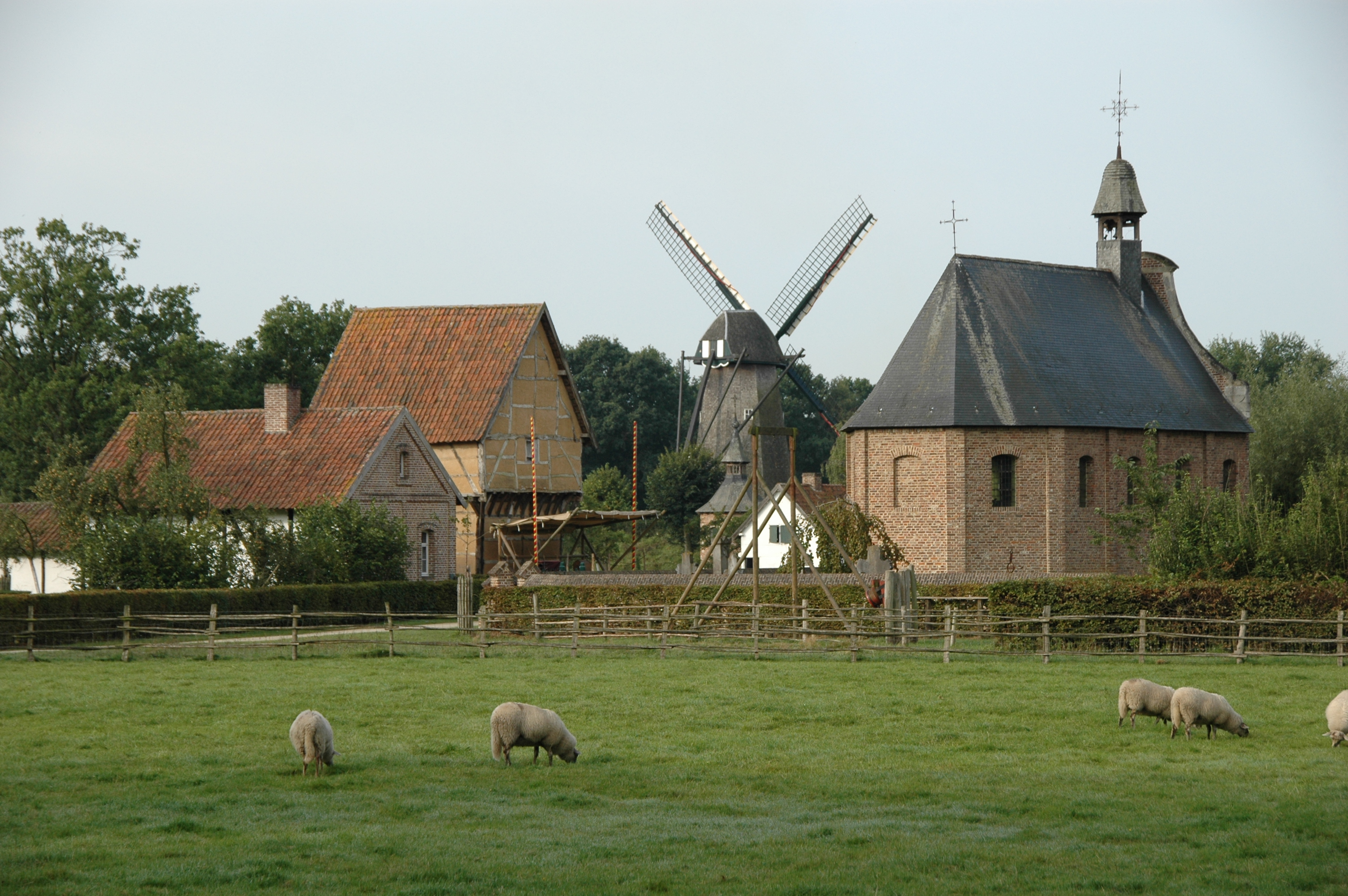
View of Bokrijk's recreated Hesbaye village

The Bokrijk Provincial Domain (Dutch: Provinciaal Domein Bokrijk, pronounced [ˈbɔkrɛik]) is a park and museum complex near Genk, Province of Limburg in Belgium. It is known for its open-air museum which displays a large collection of historical buildings from across Flanders which presents the history of rural life in the region. The domain is 5.5 square kilometres (2.1 sq mi) in area and also hosts an important botanical garden (arboretum), nature reserve, and the largest open-air playground in Flanders.

== History ==
On March 9, 1252 Arnold IV, Count of Loon and Chiny (county of Loon) sold a forest, that was situated between present Genk, Zonhoven and Hasselt, to the abbey of Herkenrode. This forest was called 'Buscurake' or Buksenrake ('buk' = beech, 'rake' = a part of land). The name later evolved into 'Bouchreyck' and eventually to Bokrijk. The Cistercian abbey of Herkenrode (in Kuringen near Hasselt) built a grangiae (abbey farm), dug out fish ponds and started forestry practices. The abbey farm was cultivated by lay brothers and from 1447 onwards functioned as an ordinary tenant farm. It remained the abbey's property until the years of the French Revolutionary Wars. In 1797 French Revolutionaries seized all properties of the Cistercian abbey and the same year sold it to a private investor from Maastricht.

Subsequently, the buildings were neglected by many owners until 1890. In that year the Maris-Vanhese family demolished the residential area, but left the outbuildings. They built a neo-classical castle, but were unable to complete it. In 1896 it was sold to the Count de Meeus who did finish the castle. The Count owned a local iron mine until the outbreak of World War I. During the war he sold the land and castle to a Jewish family from Germany. In 1919 the Belgian State seized the land and sold it to S.V. Middenkredietkas van de Boerenbond (Central Credit Bank of the Farmer's Union). They set Bokrijk up as a model farm. Due to a crisis and eventual bankruptcy of the Farmers Union, the model farm failed.

== Bokrijk Open-Air Museum ==
On 21 March 1938 the provincial government of Limburg, inspired by Governor Hubert Verwilghen, acquired Bokrijk. Verwilghen strove to create a public domain that would combine culture and nature. His vision would be realized years later under the dynamic impulse of provincial governor Louis Roppe. On 6 October 1953 the Provincial Council of the Province of Limburg decided to create an open-air museum in Bokrijk. With the post-war industrial revolution and the increasing development projects of the 1950s, Flanders's living environment was drastically changing. Agricultural buildings of important cultural and historical value for Flanders were disappearing from the landscape. Dr Jozef Weyns was appointed to coordinate the project and remained in function as first conservator of the Open Air Museum of Bokrijk. The museum opened to the public on 12 April 1958 as a contribution of the province of Limburg to the Expo '58 (Brussels World's Fair).

There are 148 authentic buildings that form the heart of the heritage collection. Also in the collection are some 30,000 pieces of everyday life from the 17th century to 1950. It has been designed to be interactive and includes staff who take on the roles of people from different periods. The oldest building dates back to 1507. Although the emphasis is on farms and farming, there are other examples of village life such as a smithy, a school, a church, an inn and several craftsmen's buildings. Due to changes in Belgian heritage law, buildings can now only be preserved in situ. Therefore, no more buildings can be moved to Bokrijk.

The museum's preserved buildings are grouped in three clusters on the site which are arranged by their region of origin:

1. "The Kempen"
2. "East and West Flanders"
3. "Haspengouw and the Maasland"

A fourth area in the south-west corner of the site is dedicated to The Sixties.

The region of the museum that represents East and West Flanders has no village setting. Instead there are a number of buildings that show characteristic workplaces and housing.

The Kempen region lies between the Scheldt polders and Maaskant in north-east Flanders. The museum has reproduced the traditional timber farm dwellings typical of the region as it was over a century ago.

The region of Haspengouw is known for its fruit and traditional square farmsteads. In the museum this region is represented by a copy of the village of Ulbeek as it would have looked in the 19th century. The buildings are arranged around the village square with two ponds and predominantly lime trees. Actors provide interactive experiences in the church and the school.

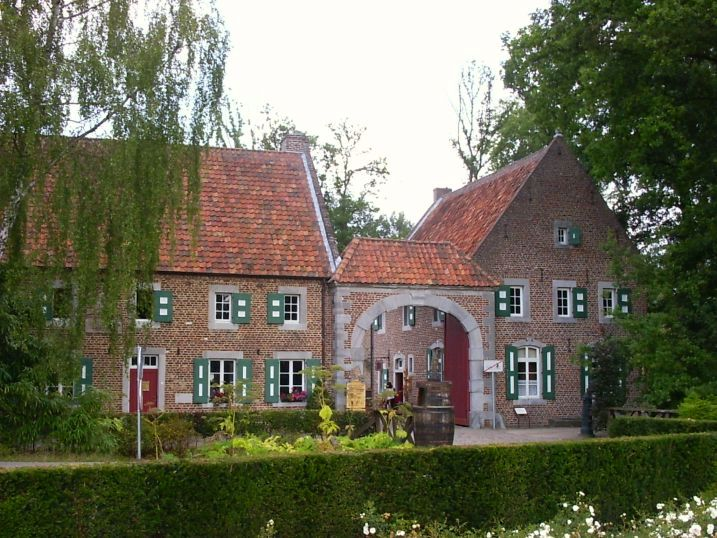
Gateway from Heers (1774) which serves as the museum's entrance

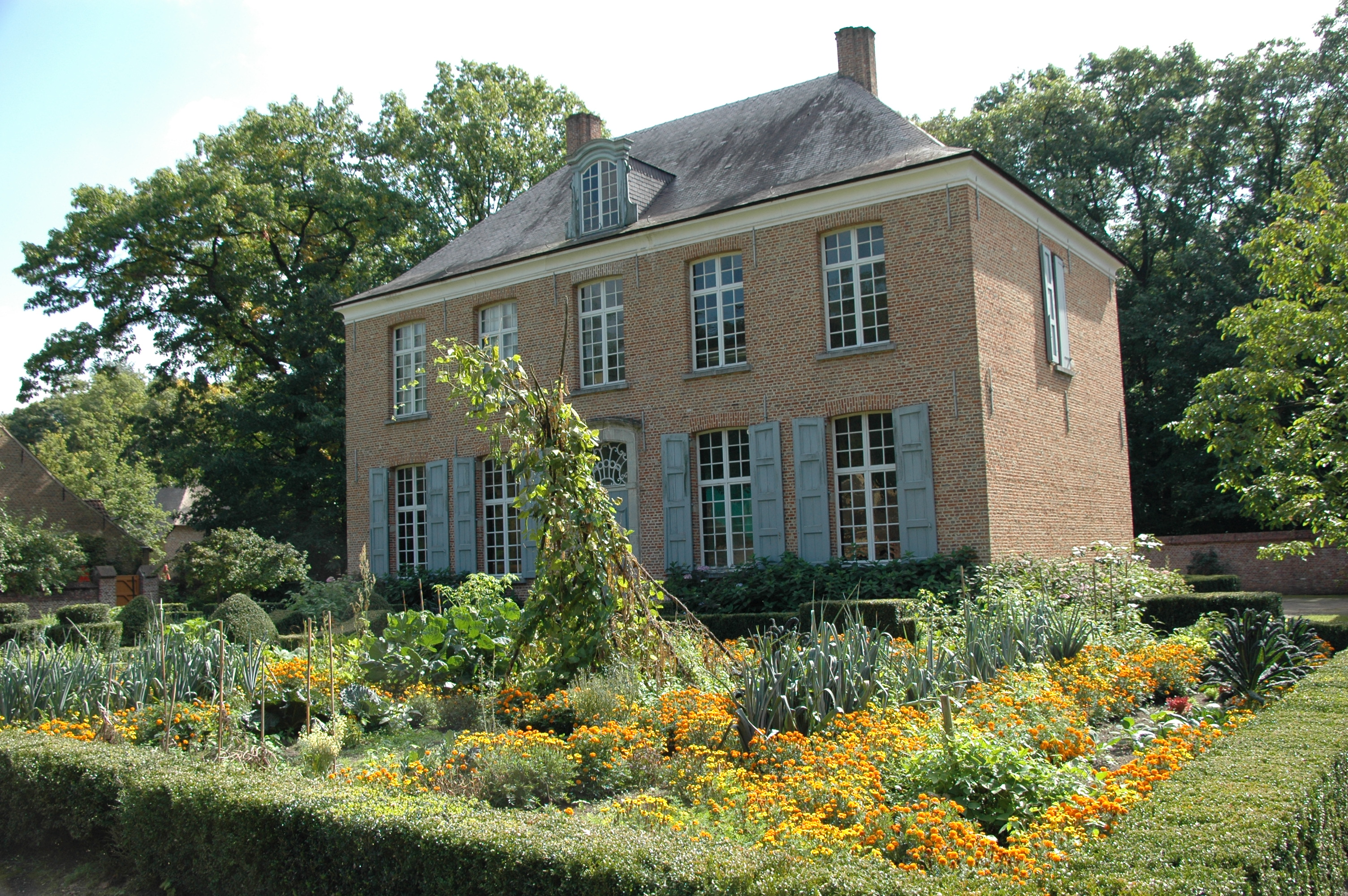
Rectory from Schriek

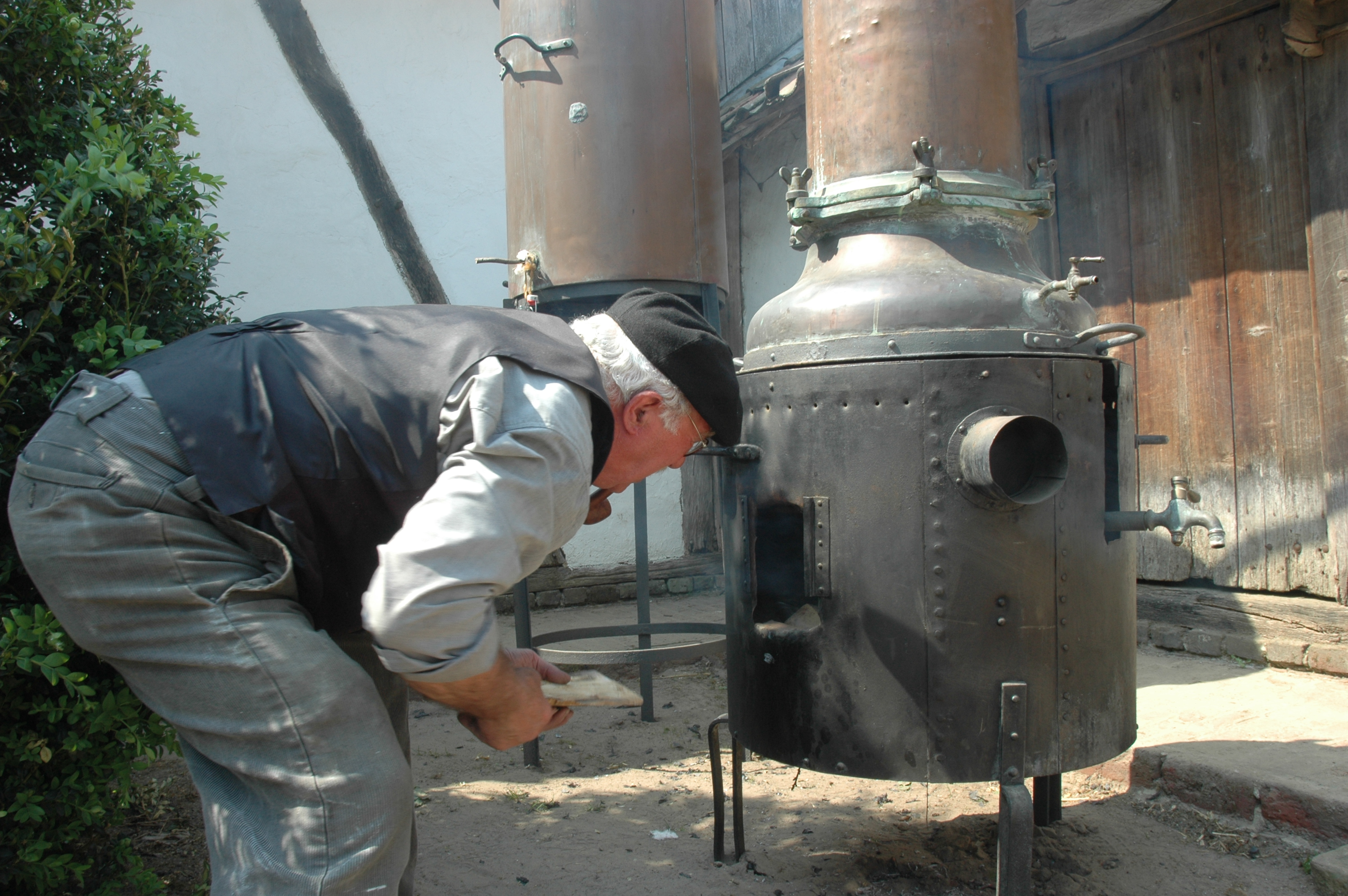
Living history - distilling jenever on authentic pot still

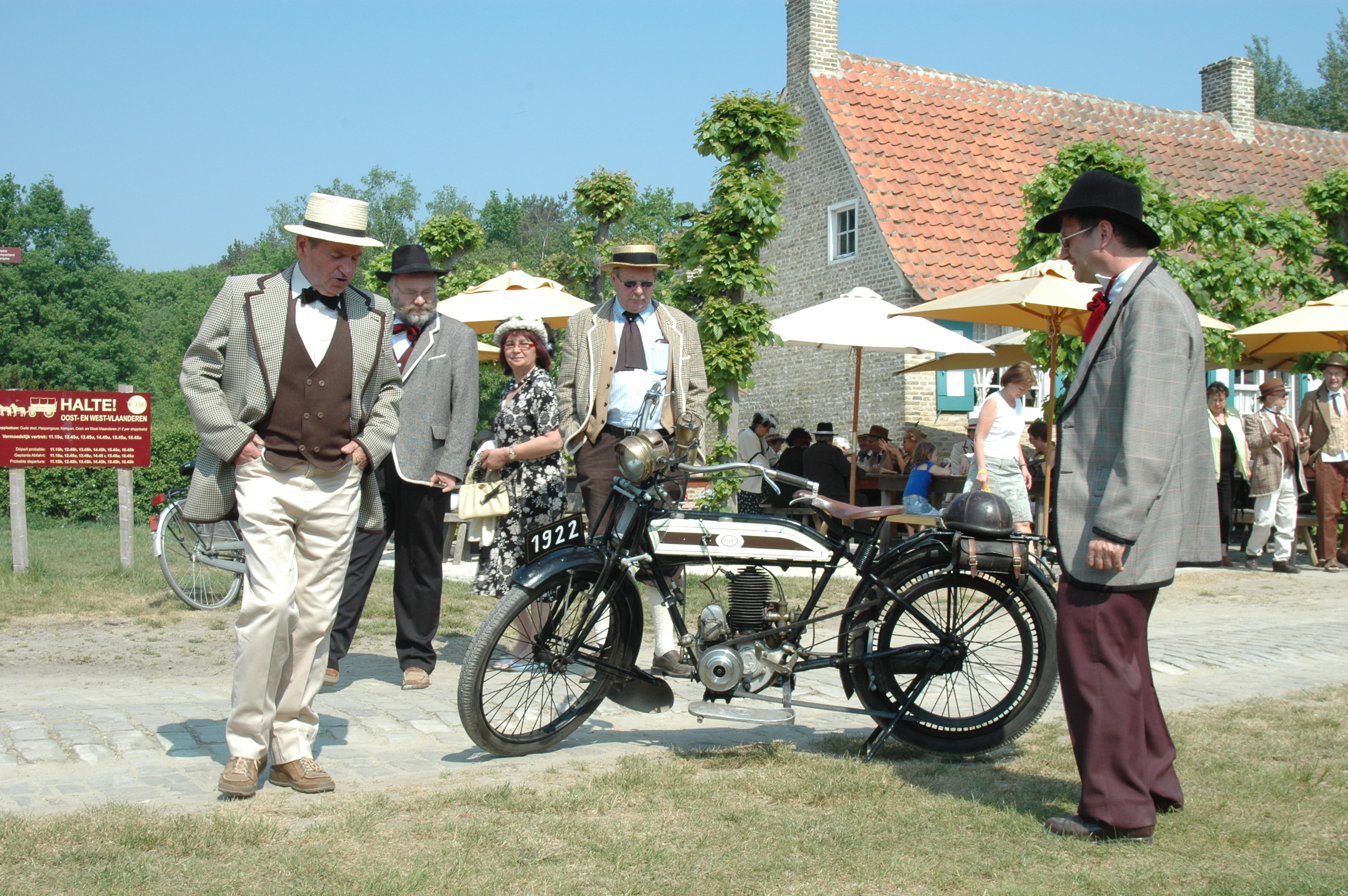
Historical re-enactment

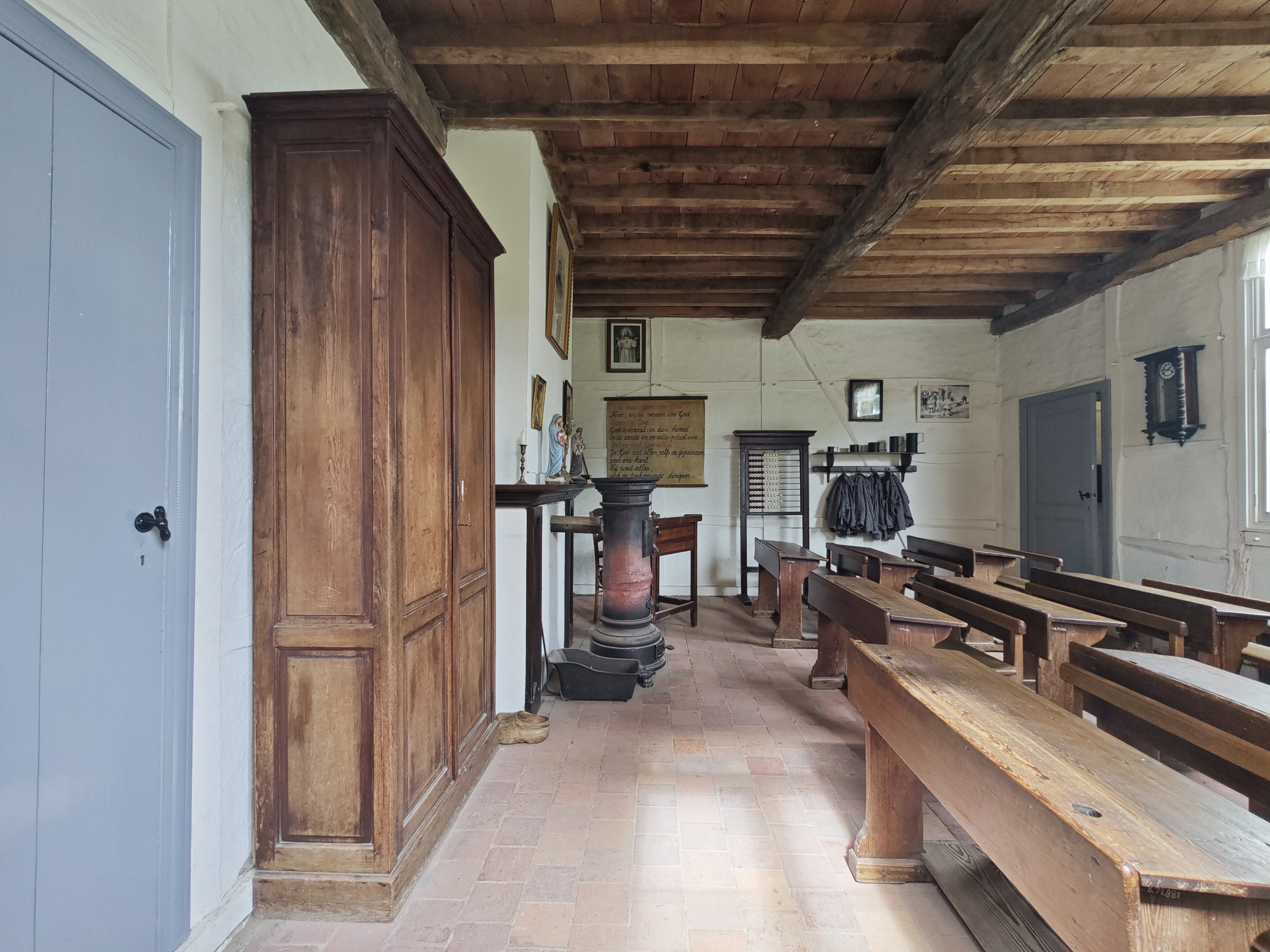
Classroom in Bokrijk

== Arboretum ==
Bokrijk is also home to one of the largest plant collections in Belgium. Started in 1965, the first arboretum covered 18 hectares. The plant collection was arranged into ornamental gardens such as the Mediterranean garden, a conservatory, a fern garden, woodland and marsh areas. Some of the plant collection has been included in the Open Air Museum, such as the herb and vegetable gardens. Near the castle and playground is the Scents and Colour garden.

== The Wik ==
This is a large nature reserve that is not open to the public, but is part of the Bokrijk parkland. Consisting of nineteen lakes and fifty acres of woodland, thickets and marsh, the site is managed by Natuurpunt. This is a volunteer organisation that owns and manages, with the help of volunteers, natural areas of Flanders.

== Playground ==
The playground situated in the parkland also houses the Speelschuur (Play Shed). There is the usual collection of play equipment on offer as well as miniature golf and mini cars.

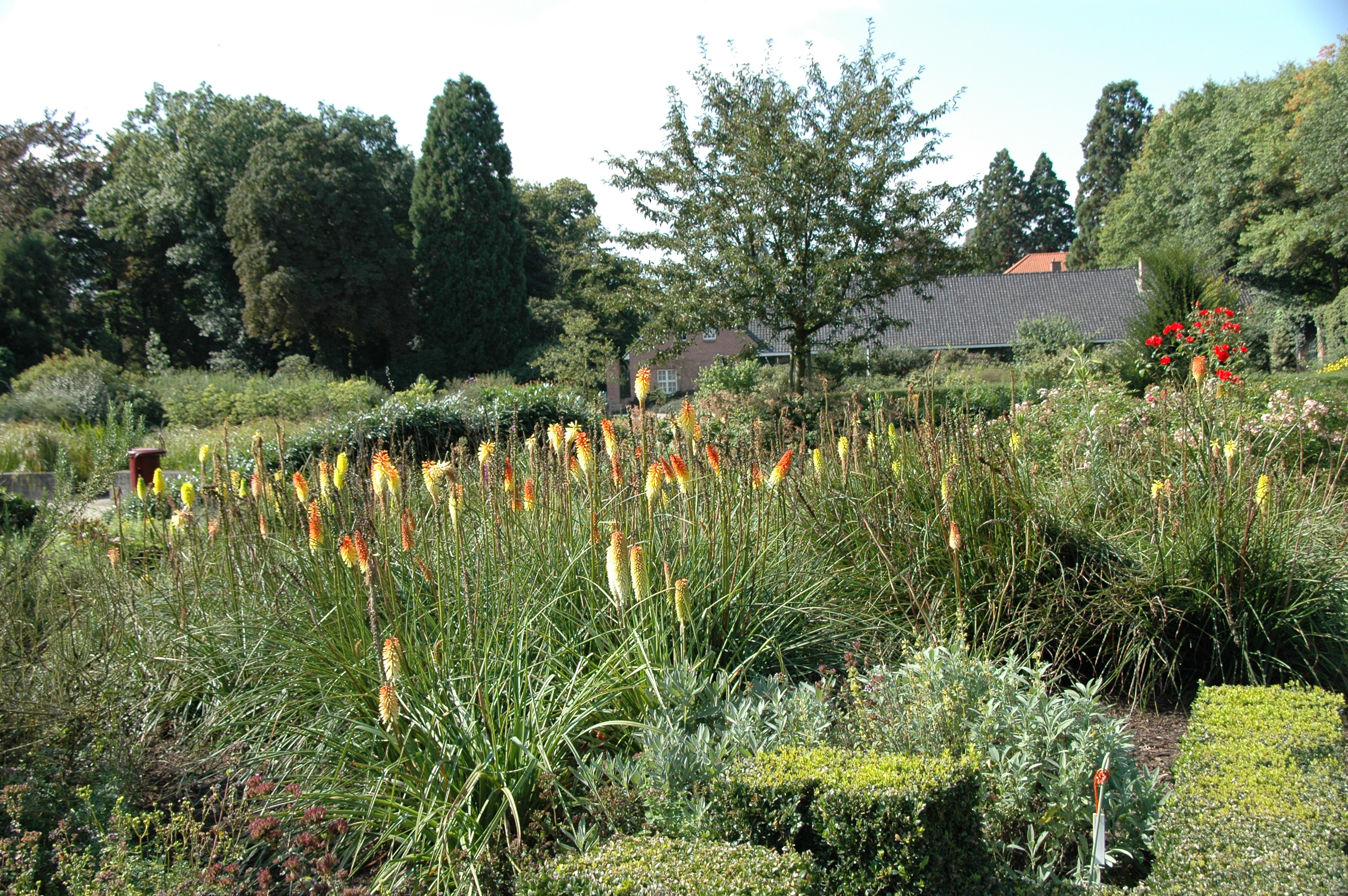
Botanical gardens

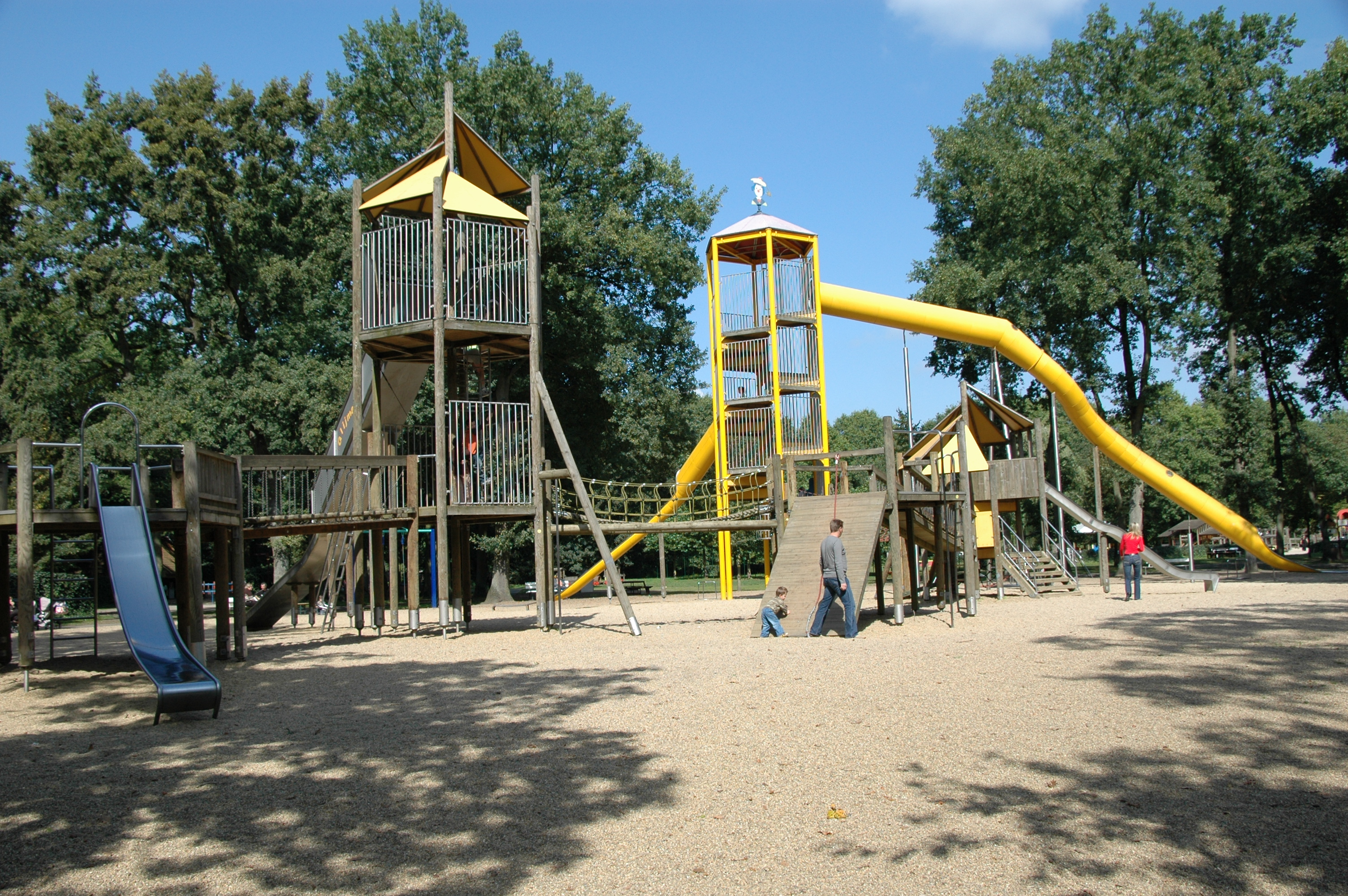
Children's playground

== Literature ==
- De Keyzer (Laurens). The Open-Air Museum Bokrijk. Gent-Amsterdam, Ludion, Ludion Guides, 2001, 128p. (photos: Michiel Hendryckx)
- Rentzhog (Sten). Open Air Museums. The history and future of a visionary idea. Kristianstad, Carlsson/Jamtli, 2007, 530p. (ISBN 978-91-7948-208-4)
