= Operation Blackcock =

WWII military operation

- Part of the Western Front of the Second World War
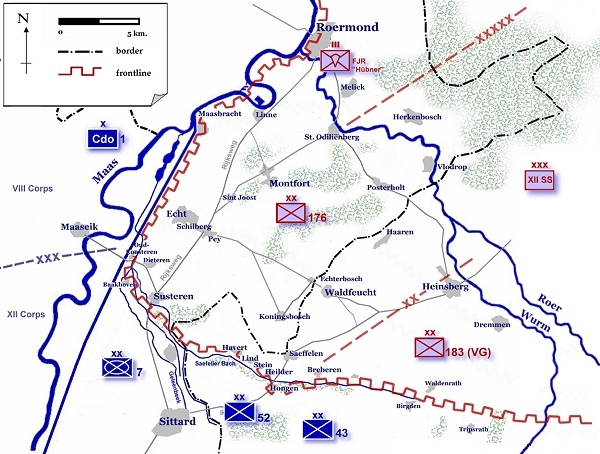
- Dispositions in the Roer Triangle, January 1945.
Date	13–27 January 1945
Location	Limburg (Netherlands) and Heinsberg (Germany)
Result	British victory

Belligerents
United Kingdom; Canada	Germany

Commanders and leaders
Neil Ritchie; Lewis Lyne; Ivor Thomas; Edmund Hakewill-Smith	Günther Blumentritt; Christian-Johannes Landau; Wolfgang Lange; Friedrich Hübner

Units involved
(United Kingdom) XII Corps; 7th Armoured Division; 8th Armoured Brigade; 43rd (Wessex) Infantry Division; 52nd (Lowland) Infantry Division	XII SS Corps; 176th Infantry Division; 183rd Volksgrenadier-Division; (Nazi Germany) Fallschirmjäger; Regiment Hübner

Strength
1 armoured division; 1 armoured brigade; 2 infantry divisions	2 infantry divisions; 2 paratroop regiments; 1 heavy panzer battalion

Casualties and losses
1,152 casualties; 20 tanks destroyed; 23 tanks broken down; 4 aircraft destroyed; 2 aircraft crashed	2,000 casualties

Operation Blackcock was an operation to clear German troops from the Roer Triangle, formed by the towns of Roermond and Sittard in the Netherlands and Heinsberg in Germany, during the fighting on the Western Front in the Second World War. It was conducted by the British Second Army between 13 and 26 January 1945. The objective was to drive the German 15th Army back across the rivers Roer and Wurm and move the frontline further into Germany. The operation was carried out by XII Corps (Lieutenant-General Neil Ritchie) by the 7th Armoured Division (Major-General Lewis Lyne), the 43rd (Wessex) Infantry Division (Major-General Ivor Thomas) and the 52nd (Lowland) Infantry Division (Major-General Edmund Hakewill-Smith). The operation, named after the Scottish male black grouse, is relatively unknown.

== Background ==
By the end of 1944, the front line in Dutch Limburg was stable along several natural barriers. The most difficult to cross was the River Maas, running along the Dutch–Belgian border. The next barrier was the River Roer, running from the German Eifel area through Heinsberg towards Roermond, where it joins the Maas. From Heinsberg, southwards the Siegfried Line or 'West Wall' was formed along the banks of the Rur. Dutch South-Limburg was already liberated in September by the First US Army but the area above the Sittard–Geilenkirchen line was still in German hands. Here, the front had settled along the "Saefeller Beek", a small creek that also seemed difficult to pass.

These terrain obstacles were called the Roermond Triangle, which protruded into the front like a bulge. After the German offensive in the Ardennes (the Battle of the Bulge), the Allies withdrew troops to stop the German advance in the First US Army sector. XII Corps of the Second Army, guarded the front north of Sittard for the US Army. The Maas front was held by the VIII Corps. XII Corps was facing the XII SS Corps (Günther Blumentritt) that had two infantry divisions present along the front between Geilenkirchen and Roermond. In the Roermond area these divisions were strengthened by the Fallschirmjäger-Regiment Hübner.

== Blackcock ==
The clearing of the Roer Triangle was planned along three axes. The left axis, formed by the 7th Armoured Division, was aimed at capturing the bridge across the Roer in Sint Odiliënberg (51°8′55.9″N 6°0′12.6″E). For the 7th Armoured Division, the operation would start with bridging the creeks south of Susteren. The centre axis, formed by the 52nd (Lowland) Infantry Division, was aimed at the capture of Heinsberg. A break-through at the German defence line was to be undertaken near Hongen to open the road between Sittard and Heinsberg. The right axis, formed by the 43rd (Wessex) Infantry Division, was aimed at clearing the area south-east of Dremmen. This axis would use the break in the German defence line that was to be created by the Lowland Division.

=== Sint Joost ===
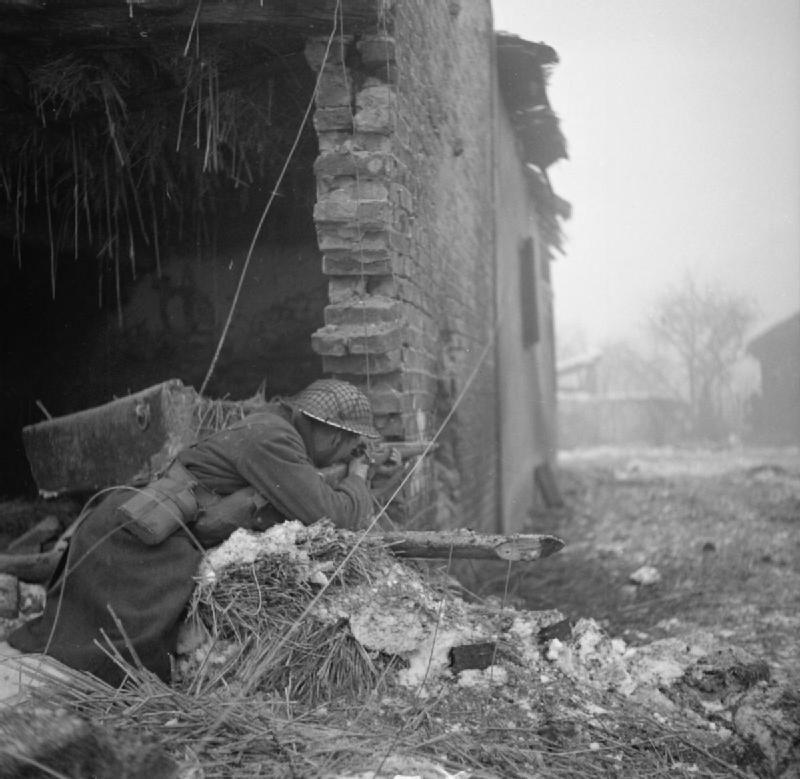
Soldier firing on German positions during the XII Corps offensive north of Sittard, 16 January 1945

The Battle for the Dutch village of Sint Joost was a turning point in Operation Blackcock. After four days of fighting, the Germans knew that the armoured division that was facing them relied on the roads to manoeuvre their vehicles, due to poor winter conditions. The small village of Sint Joost was on the route of the 7th Armoured Division advance north towards Montfort. On 20 January, the 7th Armoured Division launched a first attack on the (assumed) two German companies of the 2nd Battalion Fallschirmjäger Regiment Hübner in Sint Joost. It took four attacks to clear the village, the final assault taking place on Sunday, 21 January. Sixty Fallschirmjäger were taken prisoner. The 9th Durham Light Infantry (9th DLI) suffered 33 casualties, of which eight were killed in action. The Rifle Brigade counted 34 casualties, of which three men from 1 Company were killed in action. More than a hundred German soldiers were killed. German paratroopers who survived only left cellars under civilian cover, afraid that they would be shot by the victors. Hübner had lost one company and a second had been nearly destroyed.

=== Bombing of Montfort ===
Between Friday evening on 19 January and Tuesday 23 January the Dutch village of Montfort was shelled or bombed on seven occasions. The village was hit by more than 100 bombs most falling in the centre of the village, damaging most of the 250 houses. The Germans sheltered in the cellars among the civilians and in the wooded areas just outside the village. The bombing raids that struck Montfort on 21 and 22 January were carried out by the canadian 143 Wing of 83 (Composite) Group in the 2nd Tactical Air Force. The wing consisted of 438 Squadron, 439 Squadron and 440 Squadron, based at Eindhoven. The squadrons were equipped with the Hawker Typhoon 1B fighter bomber. The wing lost six aircraft during Operation Blackcock, two of which crashed in Montfort. When Montfort was finally liberated on 24 January, 186 civilians had been killed.

== Aftermath ==
=== Analysis ===
The operation was a success for the Allies since all its objectives were met. The German divisions were forced out of the Roer Triangle except for the area immediately south of Roermond, where Hübner's paratroopers stayed in control.

=== Subsequent operations ===
Monument as part of the mass grave of the 186 victims of the bombing raids at the cemetery of Montfort

Once Blackcock was complete, the plans for the capture of the Rhineland could commence. Operation Veritable, by the First Canadian Army, was launched on 8 February to break through the German defences in the Klever Reichswald, about 37 mi (60 km) north of the Roer Triangle. Operation Grenade, the southern part of the pincer movement, by the Ninth US Army (General William Simpson) was launched on 23 February. The Ninth US Army crossed the river Roer south of Heinsberg in the early hours of 23 February 1945. Twelve hours later Simpson had 16 battalions on the east bank, together with seven heavy bridges and several light assault bridges. American losses were light on the first day and 700 prisoners were taken. A task force was formed by XVI Corps which rushed towards Venlo to meet the British in the north. On 1 March Roermond was captured by the reconnaissance troop of the 35th Infantry Division unopposed.

=== Casualties ===
The 52nd (Lowland) Division suffered 752 casualties, of whom 101 were killed and 258 soldiers were relieved because of sickness, most due to adverse weather. The 7th Armoured Division suffered just over 400 casualties; twenty tanks were knocked out and 23 broke down. Of the knocked-out tanks ten were write-offs. German casualties was approximately 2,000 men. During the operation, 490 prisoners were taken by the 7th Armoured Division, amongst them six officers. The 52nd (Lowland) Infantry Division took more than 1,200 prisoners and the 43rd (Wessex) Division took about 400 prisoners.

=== Victoria Cross ===
- Posthumous, Fusilier Dennis Donnini of the 4/5 Royal Scots Fusiliers, 52nd (Lowland) Division, is buried at the Sittard War Cemetery (Netherlands).
- Posthumous, Lance Corporal Henry Eric Harden of the Royal Army Medical Corps (RAMC), attached to 45 Commando, is buried at Nederweert War Cemetery (Netherlands).
