= Gabriel Brühl =

- Born: September 27, 1691; Eygelshoven, Habsburg Netherlands
- Died: September 10, 1743; Ubach over Worms, Habsburg Netherlands
- Spouse: Anna Jeanne Boymans
- Children: Wilhelmus Josephus Brühl, Anna Sophia Brühl, Maria Gertrudis Brühl
- Parents: Henricus Brühl (father); Agnes Wehlen (mother)
- Status: Executed
- Criminal charges: Satanism, burglary, armed robbery, theft and assault
- Penalty: Death by hanging

Gabriel Brühl (Eygelshoven, Habsburg Netherlands, 27 September 1691 - Ubach over Worms, Habsburg Netherlands, 10 September 1743) was a Dutch criminal.

Together with 10 other gang members, he was executed on 10 September 1743, during the first executions of the Buckriders, a notorious 18th century crime syndicate. Brühl was named as an accomplice in de voluntary confessions of Anne Barbe Pennarts and Joannes Moulen, as well as in the torture confessions of Frans Willem Kerckhoffs, Peter Caspar ten Konig and Joannes Dirckx (also known as Den Dock).

Brühl was the 4th-great-grandfather of the Belgian detective writer Georges Simenon, who sometimes used "Brulls" as a pseudonym.
