= 8th Parachute Division =

German WWII airborne division

- German: 8. Fallschirmjäger-Division
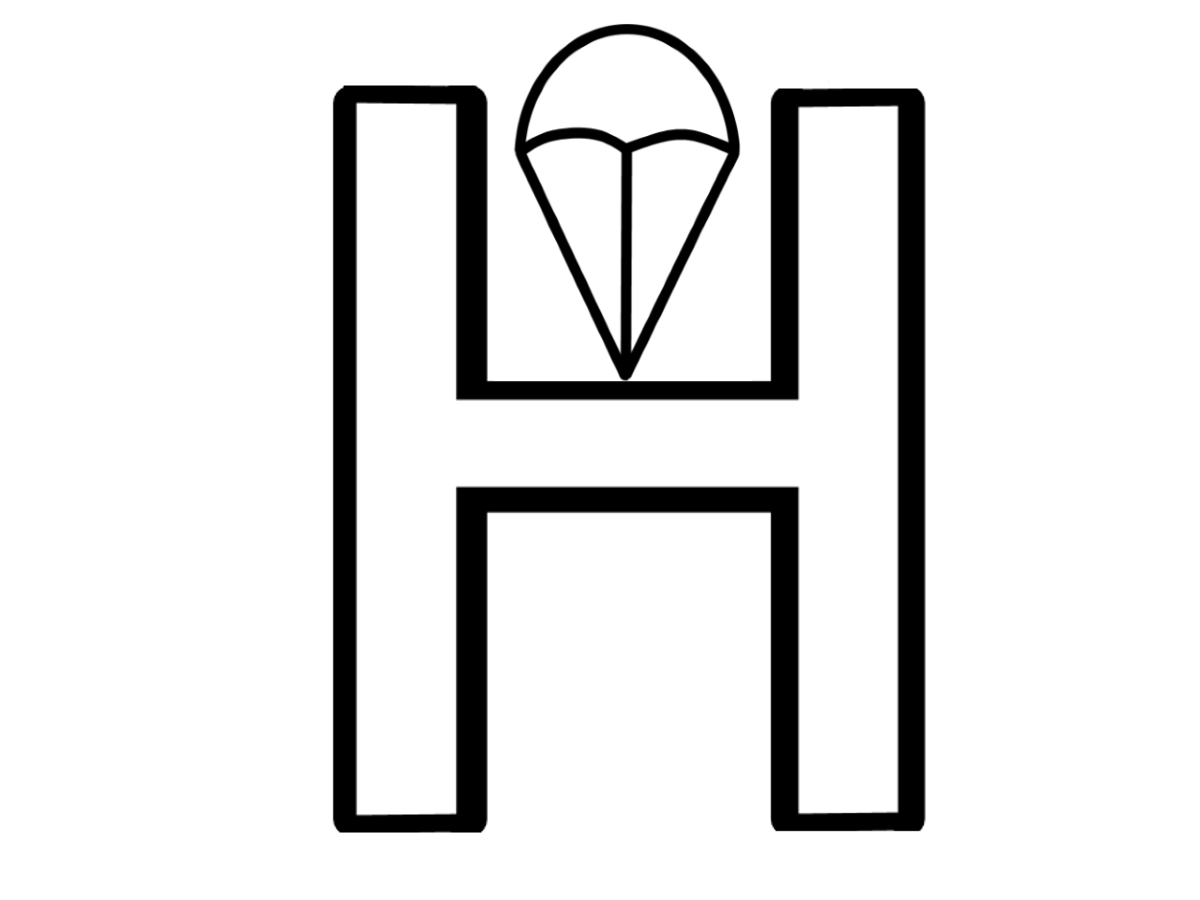
- Unit insignia
- Active: 1945
- Disbanded: 1945
- Country: Germany
- Branch: Luftwaffe
- Type: Fallschirmjäger
- Size: Division

Commanders
- Notable commanders: Walter Wadehn

The 8th Parachute Division (German: 8. Fallschirmjäger-Division) was a division of the German military during the Second World War, active in 1945. It was fallschirmjäger in title only and was trained and served as a regular infantry unit.

An 8th Fallschirmjäger Division was originally ordered to be formed in September 1944, but this order was cancelled. The division was formed in January 1945, commanded by Walter Wadehn throughout its existence. It contained the 22nd, 24th and 32nd Fallschirmjäger Regiments.

The division fought in the Netherlands and then withdrew through Germany, finally being trapped in the Ruhr pocket in April 1945 and destroyed.
