= Sint Joost =

- Village
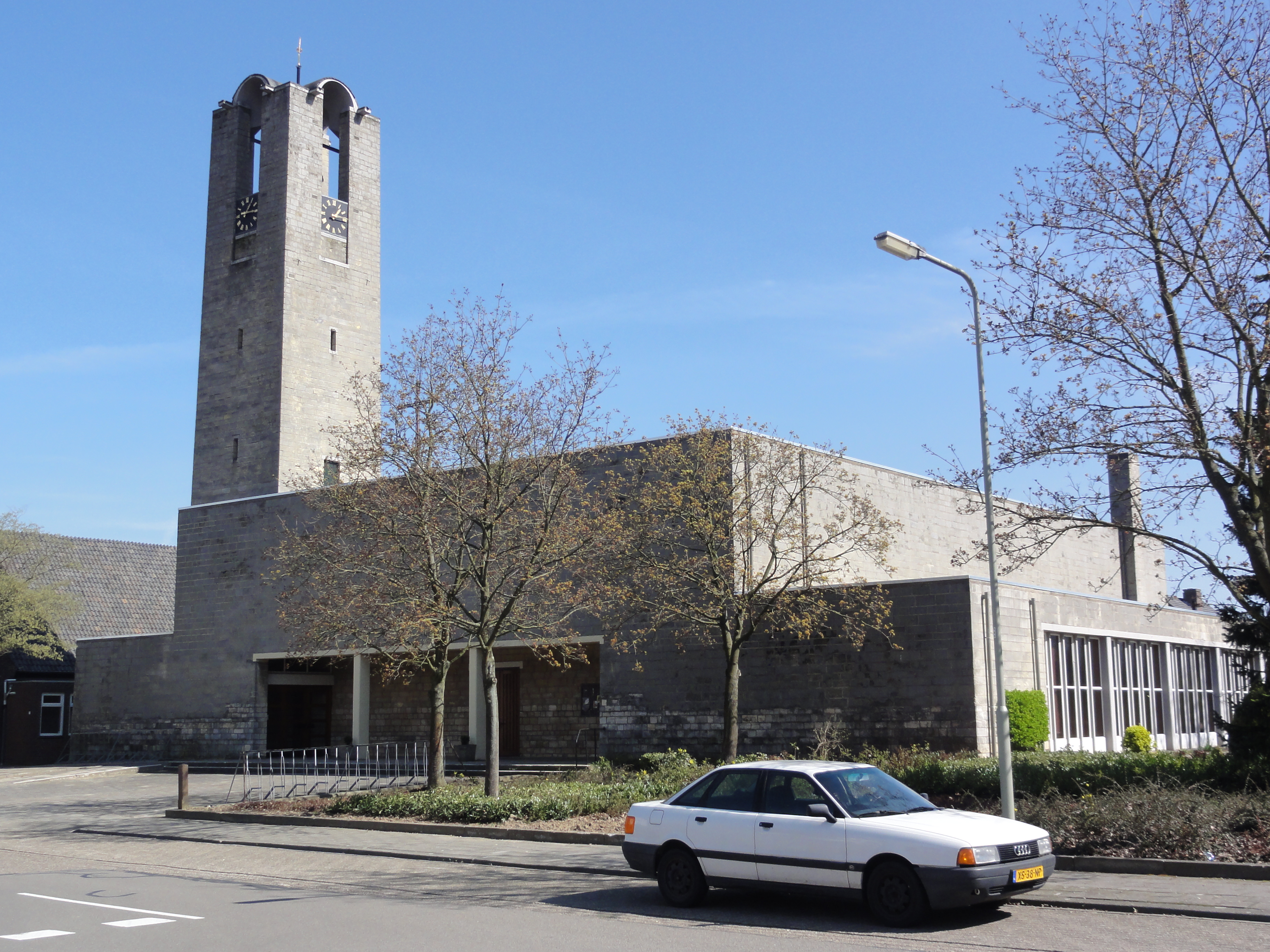
- St Judocus Church

- Location in the Netherlands Location in the province of Limburg in the Netherlands
- Coordinates: 51°07′N 5°54′E
- Country: Netherlands
- Province: Limburg
- Municipality: Echt-Susteren

Area
  - Total: 8.85 km^{2} (3.42 sq mi)
- Elevation: 29 m (95 ft)

Population (2021)
  - Total: 1,440
  - Density: 163/km^{2} (421/sq mi)
- Time zone: UTC+1 (CET)
  - Summer (DST): UTC+2 (CEST)
- Postal code: 6112
- Dialing code: 0475
- Major roads: A2, A73, N271, N276

Sint Joost (Limburgish: Sint-Joas) is a Dutch village in the municipality of Echt-Susteren.

== History ==
The village was first mentioned in 1294 or 1295 as "De curte Sancti Judoci", and refers to Saint Judoc. Sint Joost is a linear settlement which developed around a Valliscaulian monastery. The farm Kloosterhof is a 13th century remnant of the monastery which was converted into a farm in the 18th century. The area of Sint Joost is frequently raided by the so-called "Buckriders" (Bokkenrijders) between 1730 and 1780.

Sint Joost was home to 226 people in 1840. On 20 and 21 January 1945 the village was largely destroyed during the liberation by the British troops during Operation Blackcock. The St Judocus Church is chalk stone aisleless church with a square tower built between 1958 and 1959.

In 2013, a light earthquake was measured with a force of 3.4 on scale of Richter.

== Gallery ==
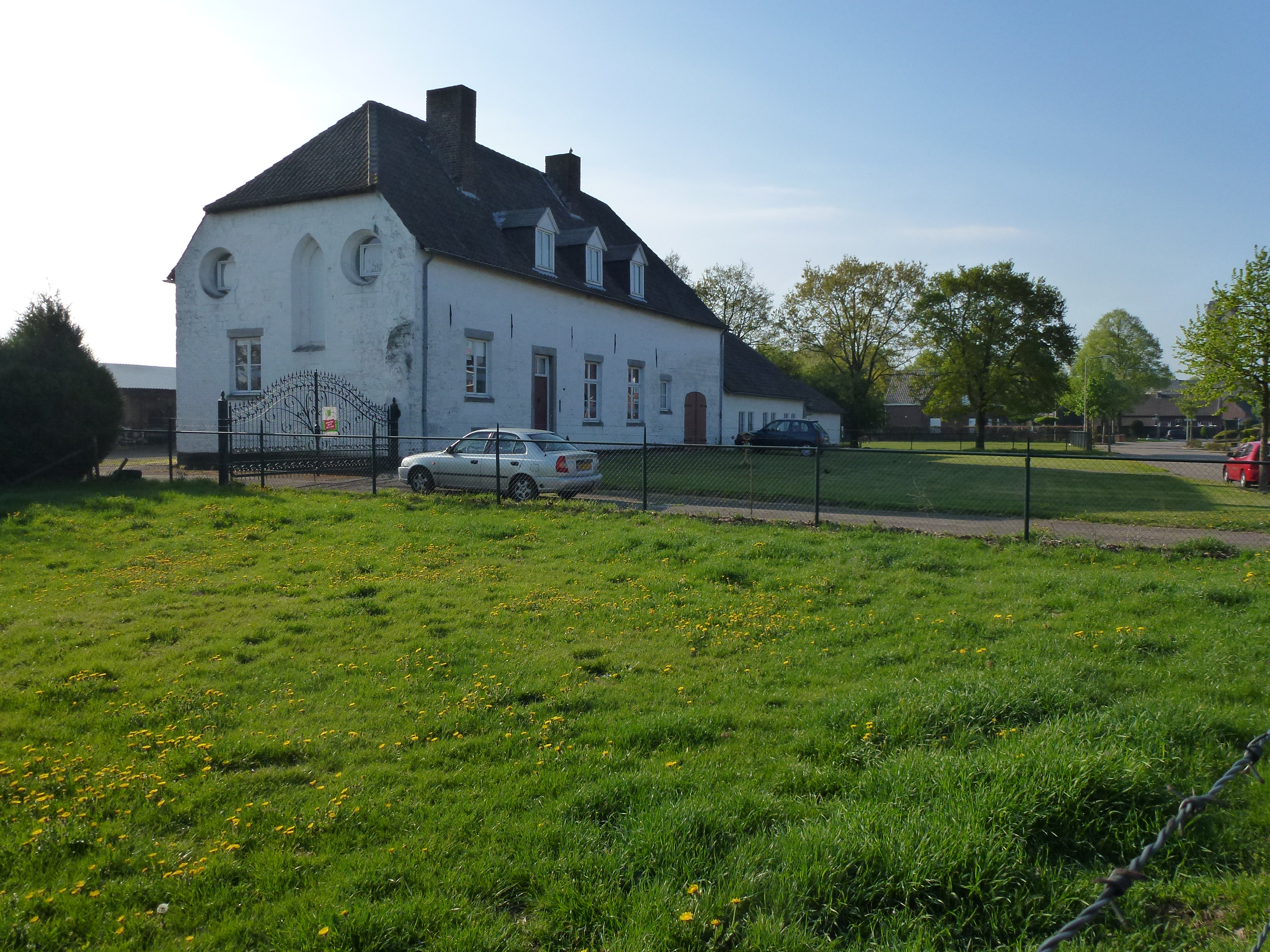
Former monastery farm

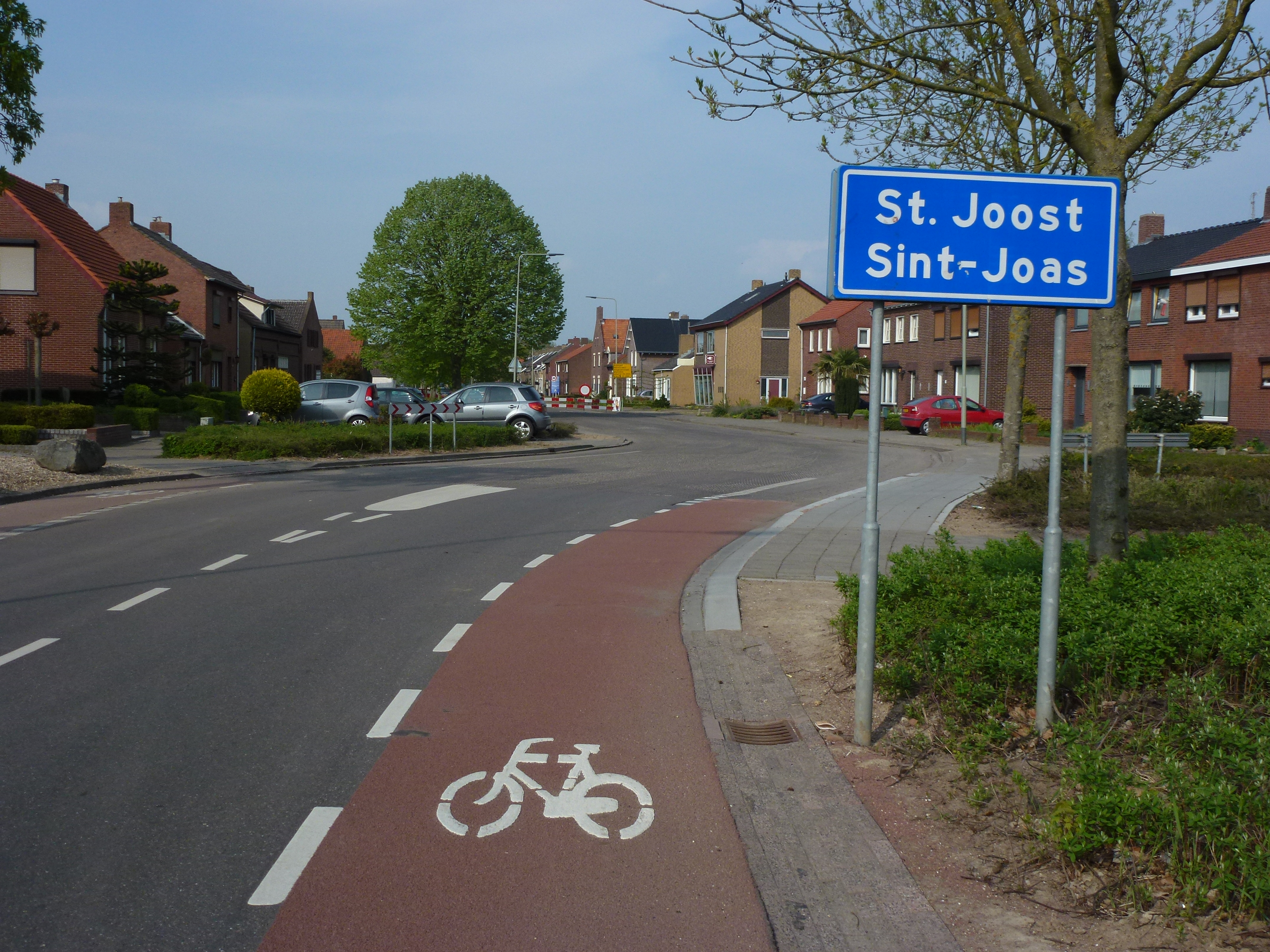
Welcome to Sint Joost
