= Maaskant =

Maaskant is a Dutch surname. Notable people with the surname include:

- Hugh Maaskant (1907–1977), Dutch architect
- Martijn Maaskant (born 1983), Dutch cyclist
- Robert Maaskant (born 1969), Dutch footballer and manager
