= 176th Infantry Division =

- Divisional insignia
- Active: October 1944 - May 1945
- Country: Nazi Germany
- Branch: Army
- Type: Infantry
- Size: Division
- Engagements: Battle for the Roer Triangle (Operation Blackcock); Ruhr Pocket

Commanders
- Notable commanders: Generalmajor Landau

The 176th Infantry Division was a military formation that served with the German Army during World War II.

== Brief history ==
On 31 October 1944, the 176th Infantry Division was formed out of the 176th Division and was a “training and replacement” formation. It had a strength of about 7,000 men, most of whom were in a poor shape. The division was nicknamed the "kranken division" (sick division), because it was mostly made up of men deemed unfit for military service, such as the physically handicapped and men with severe allergies. One battalion consisted of men with serious hearing maladies, two comprised Luftwaffe personnel, (but with ample infantry training), while many others were convalescents and semi-invalids. In November and December 1944, the Division was part of the XII SS Corps, 5th Panzer Army. Between January and March 1945 the 176th Infantry Division was assigned to the XII SS Corps, 15th Army. The 176th Division was a 'regular' military formation which operated mainly on the Dutch side of the "Roer bridgehead" during Operation Blackcock. During the operation, its HQ was located at Effeld near Vlodrop. The division was actually refitting and re-equipping during the Battle of the Bulge and Operation Blackcock.

The division was assigned to the LXXIV Korps of 15th Army in April 1945 and saw action in the Duisburg area where it eventually surrendered.

== Commanders ==
The 176th Division was under the command of General-Major Christian-Johannes Landau (1897 - 1952). Landau was a World War I veteran and “artilleryman”, he took command of the division on 1 January 1945. He was awarded the Knight's Cross on 9 May 1945, two days after the official surrender of Germany . Landau held a master's degree in agriculture. He was taken into captivity on 9 May 1945 and released in 1947. He died in 1952 in Freiburg, Brunswig at the age of 55.

== Organisation ==
The division had been formed in October 1944, it included three Grenadier Regiments (the 1218th, 1219th, and 1220th). It totalled six Grenadier battalions, one Fusilier battalion and one Panzerjäger (Anti-Tank) battalion. The 1178th Artillery Regiment consisted of four battalions. From captured documents, dating from October 1944, it is believed that the 176th Division operated in so-called Battle Groups ("Kampfgruppen"), three of which were centred on the Grenadier Regiments, while the fourth was organized around the Engineer/Pioneer battalion.

== Sources ==
- U.S. Army, Order of Battle of the German Army, Washington, 1945
- Nutter, Thomas E. Mythos revisited – American Historians on German Fighting Power in WWII "Chapter 10 – Closing in with the enemy"
