= Christian-Johannes Landau =

German general during World War II

- Born: 13 October 1897
- Died: 10 December 1952 (aged 55)
- Military career
- Allegiance: German Empire; Nazi Germany
- Branch: Army
- Service years: 1914–1918; 1934–1945
- Rank: Generalmajor
- Commands: 176th Infantry Division
- Conflicts: World War II

Christian-Johannes Landau (13 October 1897 – 10 December 1952) was a German general in the Wehrmacht during World War II who commanded the 176th Infantry Division.

== Awards and decorations ==
- German Cross in Gold on 2 May 1944 as Oberst in Artillerie-Regiment 248
- Nominated for Knight's Cross of the Iron Cross. The nomination by the troop was received by the Heerespersonalamt (HPA—Army Staff Office) on 28 April 1945. Major Joachim Domaschk the nomination on 6 May 1945. The book "Verliehene Ritterkreuze" (Awarded Knight Crosses) contains a note "postponed". The reason for this was that his division together with Heeresgruppe B had been annihilated in the Ruhr Pocket, the whereabouts of its commanding officer was unknown. The nomination was therefore not processed in accordance with AHA 44 Ziff. 572 (Allgemeines Heeresamt — General Army Office). A presentation was never made. The presentation date was assigned by Walther-Peer Fellgiebel.
