= Wellen =

- Municipality
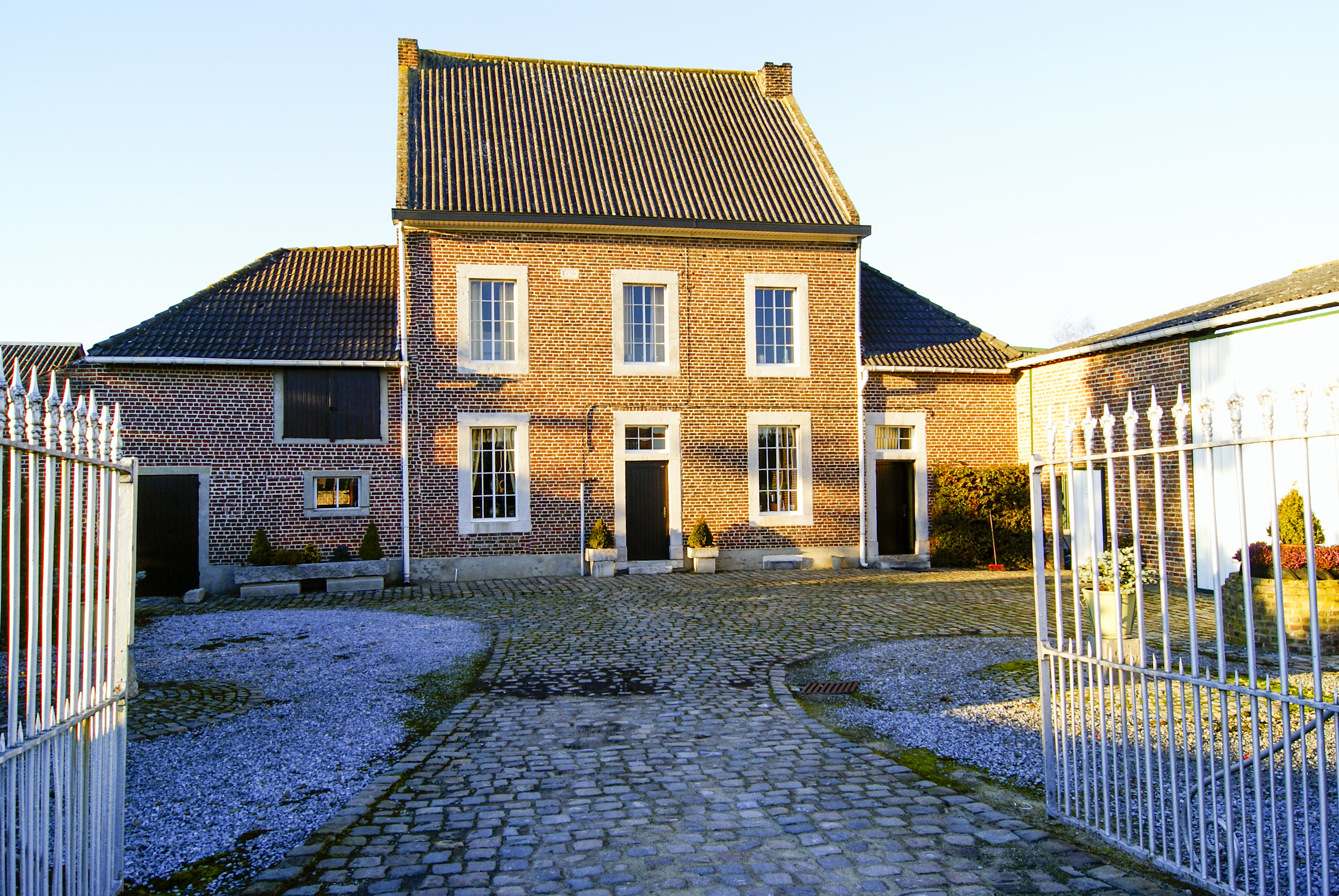

- Flag Coat of arms

- Location of Wellen in Limburg
- Interactive map of Wellen
- Location in Belgium
- Coordinates: 50°51′N 05°19′E
- Country: Belgium
- Community: Flemish Community
- Region: Flemish Region
- Province: Limburg
- Arrondissement: Tongeren

Government
  - Mayor: Els Robeyns (Vooruit)
  - Governing parties: Vooruit, CD&V

Area
  - Total: 26.8 km^{2} (10.3 sq mi)

Population (2018-01-01)
  - Total: 7,402
  - Density: 276/km^{2} (715/sq mi)
- Postal codes: 3830-3832
- NIS code: 73098
- Area codes: 012, 011
- Website: www.wellen.be

Wellen (Dutch pronunciation: ['ʋɛlə(n)]; Limburgish: Wille) is a municipality located in the Belgian province of Limburg. On 1 January 2024, Wellen had a total population of 7,490. The total area is 26.72 km^{2} with a population density of 279 inhabitants per km^{2}.

The municipality consists of the following sub-municipalities: Wellen, Berlingen, Herten and Ulbeek. Other population centres and hamlets include: Bos, Beurs, Kukkelberg, Langenakker, Oetersloven, Overbroek, Russelt, and Vrolingen.

== History ==
Archaeological findings suggest the place was inhabited already during the Frankish period (5th to 7th century). Debris from the river Herk on that spot made the soil fertile for farming. However, any mention of the name Wellene or Welnis doesn't occur until the second half of the 12th century.

The name Wellen derives from the Middle Dutch "wellene", meaning "source" or "pit" or, alternately, from Latin terra Villina, "agricultural holding". Wellen was long associated with the abbey of Munsterbilzen, founded around 670.
