= List of Knight's Cross of the Iron Cross recipients (L) =

The Knight's Cross of the Iron Cross (German: Ritterkreuz des Eisernen Kreuzes) and its variants were the highest awards in the military and paramilitary forces of Nazi Germany during World War II. The Knight's Cross of the Iron Cross was awarded for a wide range of reasons and across all ranks, from a senior commander for skilled leadership of his troops in battle to a low-ranking soldier for a single act of extreme gallantry. A total of 7,321 awards were made between its first presentation on 30 September 1939 and its last bestowal on 17 June 1945. (Note: Großadmiral and President of Germany Karl Dönitz, Hitler's successor as Head of State (Staatsoberhaupt) and Supreme Commander of the Armed Forces, had ordered the cessation of all promotions and awards as of 11 May 1945 (Dönitz-decree). Consequently the last Knight's Cross awarded to Oberleutnant zur See of the Reserves Georg-Wolfgang Feller on 17 June 1945 must therefore be considered a de facto but not de jure hand-out.) This number is based on the analysis and acceptance of the order commission of the Association of Knight's Cross Recipients (AKCR). Presentations were made to members of the three military branches of the Wehrmacht—the Heer (Army), Kriegsmarine (Navy) and Luftwaffe (Air Force)—as well as the Waffen-SS, the Reichsarbeitsdienst (RAD—Reich Labour Service) and the Volkssturm (German national militia). There were also 43 recipients in the military forces of allies of the Third Reich.

These recipients are listed in the 1986 edition of Walther-Peer Fellgiebel's book, Die Träger des Ritterkreuzes des Eisernen Kreuzes 1939–1945 — The Bearers of the Knight's Cross of the Iron Cross 1939–1945. Fellgiebel was the former chairman and head of the order commission of the AKCR. In 1996, the second edition of this book was published with an addendum delisting 11 of these original recipients. Author Veit Scherzer has cast doubt on a further 193 of these listings. The majority of the disputed recipients had received the award in 1945, when the deteriorating situation of Germany in the final days of World War II in Europe left a number of nominations incomplete and pending in various stages of the approval process.

Listed here are the 386 Knight's Cross recipients of the Wehrmacht and Waffen-SS whose last name starts with "L". Scherzer has challenged the validity of sixteen of these listings. The recipients are ordered alphabetically by last name. The rank listed is the recipient's rank at the time the Knight's Cross was awarded.

== Background ==
The Knight's Cross of the Iron Cross and its higher grades were based on four separate enactments. The first enactment, Reichsgesetzblatt I S. 1573 of 1 September 1939 instituted the Iron Cross (Eisernes Kreuz), the Knight's Cross of the Iron Cross and the Grand Cross of the Iron Cross (Großkreuz des Eisernen Kreuzes). Article 2 of the enactment mandated that the award of a higher class be preceded by the award of all preceding classes. As the war progressed, some of the recipients of the Knight's Cross distinguished themselves further and a higher grade, the Knight's Cross of the Iron Cross with Oak Leaves (Ritterkreuz des Eisernen Kreuzes mit Eichenlaub), was instituted. The Oak Leaves, as they were commonly referred to, were based on the enactment Reichsgesetzblatt I S. 849 of 3 June 1940. In 1941, two higher grades of the Knight's Cross were instituted. The enactment Reichsgesetzblatt I S. 613 of 28 September 1941 introduced the Knight's Cross of the Iron Cross with Oak Leaves and Swords (Ritterkreuz des Eisernen Kreuzes mit Eichenlaub und Schwertern) and the Knight's Cross of the Iron Cross with Oak Leaves, Swords and Diamonds (Ritterkreuz des Eisernen Kreuzes mit Eichenlaub, Schwertern und Brillanten). At the end of 1944 the final grade, the Knight's Cross of the Iron Cross with Golden Oak Leaves, Swords, and Diamonds (Ritterkreuz des Eisernen Kreuzes mit goldenem Eichenlaub, Schwertern und Brillanten), based on the enactment Reichsgesetzblatt 1945 I S. 11 of 29 December 1944, became the final variant of the Knight's Cross authorized.

== Recipients ==
Knight's Cross of the Iron Cross (L)
| Service | Number of presentations | Posthumous presentations |
|---|---|---|
| Heer | 256 | 18 |
| Kriegsmarine | 19 | 2 |
| Luftwaffe | 90 | 16 |
| Waffen-SS | 21 | 1 |

The Oberkommando der Wehrmacht (Supreme Command of the Armed Forces) kept separate Knight's Cross lists, one for each of the three military branches, Heer (Army), Kriegsmarine (Navy), Luftwaffe (Air Force) and for the Waffen-SS (paramilitary of the Nazi Party). Within each of these lists a unique sequential number was assigned to each recipient. The same numbering paradigm was applied to the higher grades of the Knight's Cross, one list per grade. Of the 386 awards made to servicemen whose last name starts with "L", 38 were later awarded the Knight's Cross of the Iron Cross with Oak Leaves, six the Knight's Cross of the Iron Cross with Oak Leaves and Swords and two the Knight's Cross of the Iron Cross with Oak Leaves, Swords and Diamonds; 37 presentations were made posthumously. Heer members received 256 of the medals; 19 went to the Kriegsmarine, 90 to the Luftwaffe, and 21 to the Waffen-SS. The sequential numbers greater than 843 for the Knight's Cross of the Iron Cross with Oak Leaves and 143 for the Knight's Cross of the Iron Cross with Oak Leaves and Swords are unofficial and were assigned by the Association of Knight's Cross Recipients (AKCR) and are therefore denoted in parentheses.

This along with the + (plus) indicates that a higher grade of Knight's Cross was awarded as well.
This along with the * (asterisk) indicates that the Knight's Cross was awarded posthumously.
This along with the ? (question mark) indicates that author Veit Scherzer has expressed doubt regarding the veracity and formal correctness of the listing.

| Name | Service | Rank | Role and unit (Note: For an explanation of the various naming schemes used by the Luftwaffe, Heer, Kriegsmarine and Waffen-SS refer to nomenclature used by the Wehrmacht and Waffen-SS.) | Date of award | Notes | Image |
|---|---|---|---|---|---|---|
| [Prof. Dr.] Karl-Ernst Laage (Note: The brackets around the professor and doctor title [Prof. Dr.] denote that the academic title was attained after the Knight's Cross of the Iron Cross was awarded.) | Heer | Leutnant of the Reserves | Leader of the 1./Artillerie-Regiment 66 | 26 November 1944 | — | — |
| Helmut Labenski | Heer | Oberleutnant | Chief of the 1./Grenadier-Regiment 409 | 9 April 1944 | — | — |
| Erich Labrenz | Heer | Hauptmann | Commander of the III./Infanterie-Regiment 480 | 31 December 1941 | — | — |
| Heinz-Oskar Laebe+ | Heer | Oberstleutnant (Note: According to Scherzer as Major.) | Commander of the I./Grenadier-Regiment 44 | 7 March 1944 | Awarded (854th) Oak Leaves 29 April 1945? (Note: Heinz-Oskar Laebe's nomination was prepared for signature by the Heerespersonalamt (HPA—Army Staff Office) by the end of the war. According to the Association of Knight's Cross Recipients (AKCR) the award was present in accordance with the Dönitz-decree. This is illegal according to the Deutsche Dienststelle (WASt) and lacks legal justification. The presentation date is an assumption of the AKCR. Laebe was a member of the AKCR.) | — |
| Walter Lämmel (Note: According to Scherzer name is spelled Walther Lämmel, who received the Knight's Cross of the Iron Cross as Oberleutnant of the Reserves.) | Heer | Oberleutnant | Leader of the I./Grenadier-Regiment 366 | 17 March 1945 | — | — |
| Hanns Laengenfelder+ | Heer | Oberstleutnant | Commander of the Grenadier-Regiment 106 | 21 October 1943 | Awarded (856th) Oak Leaves 30 April 1945 | — |
| Ehrenfried Lagois | Luftwaffe | Oberfeldwebel | Pilot in the 5./Schlachtgeschwader 2 "Immelmann" (Note: According to Scherzer as pilot in the II./Schlachtgeschwader 2.) | 26 March 1944 | — | — |
| Gustav Laier | Heer | Hauptmann of the Reserves | Leader of the II./Grenadier-Regiment 528 | 3 November 1944 | — | — |
| Josef Lainer | Waffen-SS | SS-Oberscharführer | Zugführer (platoon leader) in the 1./SS-Panzergrenadier-Regiment "Der Führer" | 8 October 1943 | — | — |
| Otto Lais | Heer | Major of the Reserves | Commander of the Grenadier-Regiment 858 | 30 September 1944 | — | — |
| Helmut Lambach | Heer | Oberleutnant of the Reserves | Chief of the 11./Grenadier-Regiment 88 | 6 March 1944 | — | — |
| August Lambert | Luftwaffe | Leutnant | Pilot in the 5./Schlachtgeschwader 2 "Immelmann" | 14 May 1944 | — | — |
| Hubertus Lamey | Heer | Oberst | Deputy leader of the 28. Jäger-Division (Note: According to Scherzer as leader of the 28. Jäger-Division.) | 12 February 1944 | — | — |
| Karl Lammer | Heer | Unteroffizier | Group leader of the Pionierzug (pioneer platoon) of the Stabskompanie/Grenadier-Regiment 105 | 13 January 1944 | — | — |
| Heinz Lammerding | Waffen-SS | SS-Oberführer | Commander of Panzer-Kampfgruppe "Das Reich" | 11 April 1944 | — | |
| Karl Lampart | Heer | Grenadier | In the 5./Grenadier-Regiment 587 | 14 April 1945 | — | — |
| Hermann Lampe | Heer | Major of the Reserves | Deputy leader of Grenadier-Regiment 419 (Note: According to Scherzer as leader of Grenadier-Regiment 419.) | 16 November 1943 | — | — |
| Wolfgang Lampp | Heer | Major | Commander of Feldersatz-Bataillon 104 | 19 December 1943* | Killed in action 23 October 1943 | — |
| Herbert Lamprecht+ | Heer | Hauptmann | Deputy commander of leichte Flak-Abteilung 76 (motorized) (Note: According to Scherzer as leader of leichte Flak-Abteilung 76 (motorized).) | 22 January 1943 | Awarded 532nd Oak Leaves 25 July 1944 | — |
| Otto Lancelle | Heer | Generalmajor | Commander of the 121. Infanterie-Division | 27 July 1941* | Killed in action 3 July 1941 | — |
| Hubert Lancier | Heer | Unteroffizier | Group leader in the 7./Grenadier-Regiment 399 | 18 February 1945 | — | — |
| Dietrich von der Lancken | Heer | Major | Commander of the III./Panzer-Regiment 24 | 29 October 1942 (Note: According to Scherzer on 21 November 1942.) | — | — |
| Christian-Johannes Landau? (Note: Christian-Johannes Landau's nomination was received by the Heerespersonalamt (HPA—Army Staff Office) on 28 April 1945. Major Joachim Domaschk approved the nomination on 6 May 1945. The book "Verliehene Ritterkreuze" (Awarded Knight Crosses) contains a note "postponed". The reason for this was that his division together with Heeresgruppe B had been annihilated in the Ruhr Pocket, and the whereabouts of its commanding officer was unknown. The nomination was therefore not processed in accordance with AHA 44 Ziff. 572 (Allgemeines Heeresamt — General Army Office). A presentation was never made. The presentation date was assigned by Walther-Peer Fellgiebel.) | Heer | Generalmajor | Commander of the 176. Infanterie-Division | 9 May 1945 | — | — |
| Gustav Landeck | Heer | Leutnant of the Reserves | Company leader in the Grenadier-Regiment 423 | 21 September 1944 | — | — |
| [Dr.] Carl-August Landfermann (Note: The brackets around the doctor title [Dr.] denote that the academic title was attained after the Knight's Cross of the Iron Cross was awarded.) | Kriegsmarine | Oberleutnant (Ing.) of the Reserve | Chief engineer on U-181 | 27 October 1943 | — | — |
| Franz Landgraf | Heer | Oberst | Commander of the 4. Panzer-Brigade | 16 June 1940 | — | — |
| Paul Landgraf | Luftwaffe | Leutnant | Flakkampftruppführer (anti aircraft combat troop leader) in the I./Flak-Regiment 19 (motorized) (Note: According to Scherzer as battery officer in the 2./Flak-Regiment 19 (motorized).) | 22 January 1943 | — | — |
| Paul Landwehr | Waffen-SS | Major of the Schupo | Commander of the II./SS-Polizei-Regiment 14 | 17 March 1945* | Killed in action 28 February 1945 | — |
| Emil Lang+ | Luftwaffe | Leutnant | Staffelführer of the 9./Jagdgeschwader 54 | 22 November 1943 | Awarded 448th Oak Leaves 11 April 1944 | — |
| Friedrich Lang+ | Luftwaffe | Oberleutnant | Pilot in the 1./Sturzkampfgeschwader 2 "Immelmann" (Note: According to Scherzer as pilot and technical officer in the I./Sturzkampfgeschwader 2 "Immelmann") | 23 November 1941 | Awarded 148th Oak Leaves 21 November 1942; 74th Swords 2 July 1944 (Note: According to Scherzer 148th Oak Leaves on 28 November 1942.) | — |
| Georg Lang | Luftwaffe | Oberfeldwebel | Observer in the 11.(H)/12. (Nahaufklärungs-Gruppe 15) (Note: According to Scherzer as observer in the Nahaufklärungsstaffel 11.(H)/12.) | 20 December 1944 | — | — |
| Hermann Lang | Heer | Rittmeister | Commander of Divisions-Füsilier-Bataillon 68 (Note: According to Scherzer as commander of Divisions-Füsilier-Bataillon (Aufklärungs-Abteilung) 68.) | 30 September 1944 | — | — |
| Hermann Lang | Waffen-SS | SS-Unterscharführer | Meldestaffelführer (messenger squad leader) in the I./SS-Panzergrenadier-Regiment 5 "Totenkopf" (Note: According to Scherzer as Meldestaffelführer (messenger squad leader) in the I./SS-Panzergrenadier-Regiment 5 "Thule".) | 23 October 1944 | — | — |
| Joachim-Friedrich Lang | Heer | Oberst | Commander of Grenadier-Regiment 481 | 4 September 1943 | — | — |
| Joseph Lang | Heer | Feldwebel | Shock troop leader in the 2./Pionier-Bataillon 15 | 4 July 1940 | — | — |
| Ludwig Lang | Heer | Oberleutnant | Chief of the 2./Artillerie-Regiment 7 | 6 October 1944 | — | — |
| Rudolf Lang | Heer | Oberstleutnant | Commander of Gebirgs-Panzer-Jäger-Abteilung 44 | 23 August 1941 | — | — |
| Fritz Langanke | Waffen-SS | SS-Standartenoberjunker | Zugführer (platoon leader) of the 2./SS-Panzer-Regiment 2 "Das Reich" (Note: According to Scherzer as Zugführer (platoon leader) of the 2./SS-Panzer-Regiment 2.) | 27 August 1944 | — | — |
| Joachim Langbehn | Luftwaffe | Hauptmann | Staffelkapitän of the 5./Sturzkampfgeschwader 2 "Immelmann" | 24 March 1943* | Killed in action 25 November 1942 | — |
| Erhard Lange | Heer | Oberleutnant of the Reserves | Company chief in the Kampfgruppe of the Sonderkommando OKW-Abwehr II "Brandenburg" (Note: According to Scherzer as chief in a Sonderkommando (special assignment commando) of the OKW, Amtsgruppe Auslandsnachrichten und Abwehr (office group foreign intelligence and defense), Abwehr-Abteilung II (2nd Defense Department).) | 15 January 1943 | — | — |
| Erich Lange | Heer | Hauptmann of the Reserves | Leader of Füsilier-Bataillon 299 (Note: According to Scherzer as leader of Divisions-Füsilier-Bataillon (A.A.) 299.) | 28 October 1944 | — | — |
| Erwin Lange | Heer | Hauptmann | Commander of the II./Grenadier-Regiment 698 | 8 October 1943 | — | — |
| Gerhard Lange | Heer | Hauptmann | Leader of the II./Panzer-Regiment 35 | 28 March 1945 | — | — |
| Günther Lange? (Note: No evidence of the award can be found in the German Federal Archives. The award was unlawfully presented by SS-Oberstgruppenführer Sepp Dietrich. The date is taken from the announcement made by the 6. SS-Panzerarmee.) | Waffen-SS | SS-Sturmmann | Group leader in the 16.(Pi)/SS-Panzer-Regiment 4 "Der Führer" | 6 May 1945 | — | — |
| Hans-Günther Lange+ | Kriegsmarine | Kapitänleutnant | Commander of U-711 | 26 August 1944 | Awarded (853rd) Oak Leaves 29 April 1945 | — |
| [Dr.] Heinz Lange | Luftwaffe | Hauptmann | Gruppenkommandeur of the IV./Jagdgeschwader 51 "Mölders" (Note: According to Scherzer as leader of the IV./Jagdgeschwader 51 "Mölders".) | 18 November 1944 | — | — |
| Paul Lange | Heer | Feldwebel | Zugführer (platoon leader) in the 1./Panzergrenader-Regiment 13 | 7 September 1944 | — | — |
| Dr. med. dent. Walter Lange+ | Heer | Oberstleutnant of the Reserves | Commander of Grenadier-Regiment 43 | 10 February 1943 | Awarded 300th Oak Leaves 13 September 1943 | — |
| Werner Lange | Kriegsmarine | Vizeadmiral | Commanding Admiral Aegean Sea | 28 October 1944 | — | — |
| Wolfgang Lange | Heer | Generalmajor | Commander of Korpsabteilung C | 14 May 1944 | — | — |
| Dr. med. habil. Carl Langemeyer | Luftwaffe | Stabsarzt of the Reserves (Note: According to Scherzer as Stabsarzt.) (rank equivalent to Hauptmann) | Commander of Fallschirm-Sanitäter-Lehr-Abteilung | 18 November 1944 | — | — |
| Georg Langendorf | Waffen-SS | SS-Untersturmführer of the Reserves | Leader of the 5.(schwere)/SS-Panzer-Aufklärungs-Abteilung 11 "Nordland" (Note: According to Scherzer as leader of the 5./SS-Panzer-Aufklärungs-Abteilung 11.) | 12 March 1944 | — | — |
| Ernst-Hasse von Langenn-Steinkeller | Heer | Rittmeister | Commander of Panzer-Aufklärungs-Abteilung 24 | 9 June 1944 | — | — |
| Willy Langenohl | Heer | Leutnant | Leader of the 3./Panzer-Pionier-Bataillon 57 | 30 April 1945 | — | — |
| Ernst-Friedrich Langenstraß | Heer | Oberleutnant | Chief of the 2./Pionier-Bataillon 28 | 5 June 1940 | — | — |
| Albert Langer | Heer | Gefreiter | Group leader in the 1./Grenadier-Regiment 51 (motorized) | 7 April 1944 | — | — |
| [Dr.] Günter Langer | Heer | Leutnant of the Reserves | Leader of Füsilier-Kompanie 191 | 5 September 1944 | — | — |
| Karl-Heinz Langer | Luftwaffe | Major | Gruppenkommandeur of the III./Jagdgeschwader 3 "Udet" | 20 April 1945 | — | — |
| Kurt Langer | Heer | Oberst | Staff officer for anti tank combat in the Oberkommando of Heeresgruppe E (Note: According to Scherzer as Stabsoffizier Panzerabwehr (staff officer for tank defense) of a Heeresgruppe [H?].) | 11 December 1944 | — | — |
| Willibald Freiherr von Langermann und Erlencamp+ | Heer | Generalmajor | Commander of the 29. Infanterie-Division (motorized) | 15 August 1940 | Awarded 75th Oak Leaves 17 February 1942 | |
| Walter Langert | Heer | Hauptmann | Commander of the I./Grenadier-Regiment 697 | 9 June 1944 | — | — |
| Karl Langesee+ | Heer | Hauptmann | Commander of the II./Jäger-Regiment 207 | 10 August 1942 | Awarded 211th Oak Leaves 15 March 1943 | — |
| Kay Langfeldt | Heer | Oberleutnant | Squadron chief of Radfahr-Abteilung 30 | 18 May 1943 | — | — |
| Alfred Langguth | Heer | Leutnant of the Reserves | Leader of the 1./Grenadier-Regiment 351 | 31 March 1943 | — | — |
| Theodor Langhart | Luftwaffe | Oberleutnant | Staffelkapitän of the 8./Sturzkampfgeschwader 77 | 22 January 1943* | Killed in action 22 December 1942 | — |
| Bernhard Langhorst | Waffen-SS | SS-Sturmbannführer (Note: According to Scherzer as SS-Sturmbannführer of the Reserves and commander of the SS-Panzer-Jäger-Abteilung 20.) | Commander of SS-Freiwilligen-Panzer-Jäger-Abteilung 20 (estn. Nr. 1) | 5 April 1945 | — | — |
| Willy Langkeit+ | Heer | Major | Commander of the II./Panzer-Regiment 36 | 9 December 1942 | Awarded 348th Oak Leaves 7 December 1943 | A black-and-white photograph of a man wearing a black military uniform, peaked cap and a neck order in shape of an Iron Cross. |
| Paul Langkopf | Luftwaffe | Oberfeldwebel | Pilot in the 1./Sturzkampfgeschwader 77 | 19 February 1943 | — | — |
| Matthias Langmaier | Heer | Hauptmann of the Reserves (Note: According to Scherzer as Hauptmann.) | Commander of the III./Gebirgsjäger-Regiment 85 | 29 February 1944 | — | — |
| Dr. jur. Dipl.-Ing. Albrecht Lanz | Heer | Major | Commander of the I./Infanterie-Regiment 396 | 4 September 1940 | — | — |
| Alfred Lanz | Heer | Unteroffizier | Group leader in the 8.(MG)/Grenadier-Regiment 44 (Note: According to Scherzer as group leader in the 8./Grenadier-Regiment 44.) | 9 January 1945 | — | — |
| Hubert Lanz+ | Heer | Oberst im Generalstab (in the General Staff) | Chief of the Generalstab of the XVIII. Armeekorps | 1 October 1940 | Awarded 160th Oak Leaves 23 December 1942 | |
| Karl-Walter Lapp | Heer | Hauptmann | Commander of Ski-Bataillon 82 | 14 August 1944 | — | — |
| Anton Larisch | Heer | Feldwebel | Zugführer (platoon leader) in the 8.(MG)/Infanterie-Regiment 190 (Note: According to Scherzer as Zugführer (platoon leader) in the 8./Infanterie-Regiment 190.) | 25 February 1942 | — | — |
| Heribert von Larisch | Heer | Generalleutnant | Commander of the 129. Infanterie-Division | 26 December 1944 | — | — |
| Rudolf Larsen | Heer | Unteroffizier | Panzer commander in the 2./Panzer-Regiment "Großdeutschland" | 23 October 1944 | — | — |
| Otto Lasch+ | Heer | Oberst | Commander of Infanterie-Regiment 43 | 17 July 1941 | Awarded 578th Oak Leaves 10 September 1944 | — |
| Ulrich Laschet | Heer | Fahnenjunker-Oberjäger | Group leader in the 1./Jäger-Regiment 54 (L) | 15 April 1944 | — | — |
| Erwin Laskowski | Luftwaffe | Oberfeldwebel | Pilot in the 8./Jagdgeschwader 11 | 27 April 1945 | — | — |
| Kurt Lasse | Luftwaffe | Oberleutnant | Staffelkapitän of the 9./Jagdgeschwader 77 | 3 May 1942* | Killed in action 8 October 1941 | |
| Wilhelm Lasse | Heer | Unteroffizier | Group leader in the 5./Grenadier-Regiment 82 | 12 March 1944* | Killed in action 26 January 1944 | — |
| Georg Lassen+ | Kriegsmarine | Oberleutnant zur See | Commander of U-160 | 10 August 1942 | Awarded 208th Oak Leaves 7 March 1943 | — |
| Albert Latz | Heer | Oberst zur Verwendung (for disposition) | Leader of Kampfgruppe "Latz" (Note: According to Scherzer as leader of Divisionsgruppe 323 (Kampfgruppe "Latz").) | 30 December 1943* | Killed in action 6 December 1943 | — |
| Fritz Lau | Luftwaffe | Hauptmann | Staffelkapitän of the 4./Nachtjagdgeschwader 1 | 28 April 1945 | — | — |
| Heinrich Lau | Luftwaffe | Major | Geschwaderkommodore of Kampfgeschwader 1 "Hindenburg" | 10 May 1943 | — | — |
| Kurt Lau | Luftwaffe | Hauptmann | Staffelkapitän of the 1./Sturzkampfgeschwader 2 "Immelmann" | 6 April 1944 | — | — |
| Lothar Lau | Luftwaffe | Oberleutnant | Staffelkapitän of the 8./Sturzkampfgeschwader 2 "Immelmann" | 22 June 1941 (Note: According to Scherzer on 24 June 1941.) | — | — |
| Werner Lau | Heer | Leutnant of the Reserves | Zugführer (platoon leader) in the 5./Lehr-Regiment z.b.V. 800 "Brandenburg" | 9 December 1942 | — | — |
| Hugo Laubereau | Heer | Oberstleutnant | Commander of Grenadier-Regiment 61 | 22 November 1943 | — | — |
| Ludwig Laubmeier | Heer | Oberleutnant of the Reserves | Chief of the 1./Sturmgeschütz-Brigade 191 | 4 October 1944 | — | — |
| Karl Lauch | Heer | Oberfeldwebel | Zugführer (platoon leader) of the 8./Panzergrenader-Regiment 14 | 5 May 1943 | — | — |
| Meinrad von Lauchert+ | Heer | Major | Commander of the I./Panzer-Regiment 35 | 8 September 1941 | Awarded 396th Oak Leaves 12 February 1944 | — |
| Otto Laudenbach | Heer | Major | Commander of the III./Grenadier-Regiment 88 | 14 December 1943 | — | — |
| Hermann Laue | Heer | Obergefreiter | Group leader in the 9./Panzergrenader-Regiment 76 | 5 April 1945* | Killed in action 24 March 1945 | — |
| Richard Laukat | Heer | Major | Commander of the II./Artillerie-Regiment 103 | 18 December 1941 | — | — |
| Kurt Launer | Waffen-SS | SS-Sturmbannführer | Commander of the II./SS-Panzergrenader-Regiment 6 "Theodor Eicke" (Note: According to Scherzer as commander of the II./SS-Panzergrenader-Regiment "Theodor Eicke".) | 15 August 1943 | — | — |
| Oskar Laupenmühlen? (Note: Oskar Laupenmühlen nomination was received by the Heerespersonalamt (HPA—Army Staff Office) on 20 March 1945 as a teleprinter message. The registry containing the approved or rejected nominations or deferred nominations contains his file card. Major Joachim Domaschk approved the nomination on 2 April 1945. The book "Verliehene Ritterkreuze" (Awarded Knight Crosses) lists him with an entry date 19 April 1945. The file contains no further evidence of the approval or presentation of the award. A presentation cannot be verified. According to the Association of Knight's Cross Recipients (AKCR) the award was presented in accordance with the Dönitz-decree. This is illegal according to the Deutsche Dienststelle (WASt) and lacks legal justification. The presentation date was assigned by Walther-Peer Fellgiebel.) | Heer | Oberfeldwebel | Leader of the 7./Grenadier-Regiment 399 | 9 May 1945 | — | — |
| Wilhelm Lauter | Heer | Leutnant of the Reserves | Leader of the 3./Artillerie-Regiment 212 | 16 January 1945 | — | — |
| Friedrich Lautz | Heer | Oberstleutnant | Commander of Grenadier-Regiment 1091 | 9 December 1944 | — | — |
| Paul Laux+ | Heer | Generalleutnant | Commander of the 126. Infanterie-Division | 14 December 1941 | Awarded 237th Oak Leaves 17 May 1943 | — |
| Dr. jur. Erich Lawall | Heer | Major of the Reserves | Commander of Radfahr-Abteilung 54 | 5 November 1942 | — | — |
| Johannes Lawrenz | Heer | Hauptmann | Commander of the III./Jäger-Regiment 38 | 14 May 1944 | — | — |
| Josef Lay | Heer | Fahnenjunker-Oberfeldwebel | Zugführer (platoon leader) in Fahnenjunker-Grenadier-Regiment 1239 | 5 April 1945* | Killed in action 15 March 1945 | — |
| Heinz Leber | Luftwaffe | Oberfeldwebel | Pilot in the 2./Jagdgeschwader 51 "Mölders" (Note: According to Scherzer as pilot in the I./Jagdgeschwader 51 "Mölders".) | 29 February 1944* | Killed in action 1 June 1943 | — |
| Michael Lechermann | Heer | Feldwebel | Zugführer (platoon leader) in Sturmgeschütz-Abteilung 1007 | 18 November 1944* | Killed in action 18 July 1944 | — |
| Franz Lechl | Heer | Oberfeldwebel | Zugführer (platoon leader) of the 5./Grenadier-Regiment 266 | 14 August 1943 | — | — |
| Alois Lechner | Luftwaffe | Hauptmann (Note: According to Scherzer as Hauptmann of the Reserves.) | Staffelkapitän of the 1./Nachtjagdgeschwader 100 | 5 February 1944 | — | — |
| Friedrich Lechner | Heer | Major of the Reserves | Commander of Feldersatz-Bataillon 212 | 27 July 1944 | — | — |
| Dipl.-Ing. Willi Lechtenbörger | Kriegsmarine | Oberleutnant (Ing.) of the Reserves | Chief engineer on U-847 | 4 September 1943* | Killed in action 27 August 1943 | — |
| Joachim Lederer | Heer | Hauptmann | Commander of Panzer-Jäger-Abteilung 344 | 30 April 1945 | — | — |
| Wilhelm Ritter von Leeb | Heer | Generaloberst | Commander-in-chief of Heeresgruppe C | 24 June 1940 | — | |
| Karl-Heinz Leesmann | Luftwaffe | Oberleutnant | Staffelkapitän of the 2./Jagdgeschwader 52 | 23 July 1941 | — | |
| Christian Lehmann | Heer | Major of the Reserves | Commander of the II./Grenadier-Regiment 726 | 4 July 1944* | Killed in action 6 June 1944 | — |
| Hans Lehmann | Kriegsmarine | Oberleutnant zur See of the Reserves | Commander of U-997 | 11 May 1945 (Note: Author Clemens Range dates Hans Lehmann's Knight's Cross on 8 June 1945, thus after the effectiveness of the Dönitz-decree. Walther-Peer Fellgiebel, author of Die Träger des Ritterkreuzes des Eisernen Kreuzes 1939–1945, indicates that Lehmann received the Knight's Cross on 11 May 1945, before the Dönitz-decree prohibited the awarding of the Knight's Cross. Scherzer dates the Knight's Cross on 7 May 1945.) | — | — |
| Hans-Georg Lehmann | Luftwaffe | Oberleutnant | Leader of the Sturmkompanie of the Divisions-Kampfschule "Hermann Göring" (Note: According to Scherzer as company leader in the Divisions-Kampfschule/Fallschirm-Panzer-Division "Hermann Göring".) | 10 October 1944 | — | |
| Hans-Joachim Lehmann | Luftwaffe | Oberleutnant | Staffelkapitän of the 8./Sturzkampfgeschwader 2 "Immelmann" | 23 November 1941 | — | — |
| Kurt Lehmann | Luftwaffe | Oberleutnant | Staffelkapitän of the 2./Kampfgeschwader 53 "Legion Condor" | 19 February 1943 | — | — |
| Paul Lehmann | Luftwaffe | Oberleutnant | Chief of the 8./Flak-Regiment 24 (motorized) | 5 April 1942 | — | — |
| [Dr.] Paul Lehmann | Kriegsmarine | Korvettenkapitän of the Reserves zur Verwendung (for disposition) | Chief of the 42. Minensuchflottille | 24 September 1944 | — | — |
| Rudolf Lehmann+ | Waffen-SS | SS-Obersturmbannführer | Ia (operations officer) of the 1. SS-Panzer-Division "Leibstandarte SS Adolf Hitler" | 23 February 1944 | Awarded (862nd) Oak Leaves 6 May 1945? (Note: No evidence of the award can be found in the German Federal Archives. The award was unlawfully presented by SS-Oberstgruppenführer Sepp Dietrich. The date is taken from the announcement made by the 6. SS-Panzerarmee. The sequential number "862" was assigned by the Association of Knight's Cross Recipients (AKCR). Lehmann was member of the AKCR.) | — |
| Waldemar Lehmann | Heer | Hauptmann | Leader of the II./Grenadier-Regiment 3 | 19 August 1944 | — | — |
| Heinrich Lehmann-Willenbrock+ | Kriegsmarine | Kapitänleutnant | Commander of U-96 | 26 February 1941 | Awarded 51st Oak Leaves 31 December 1941 | |
| Franz Lehner | Luftwaffe | Feldwebel | Combat observer in the 6./Kampfgeschwader 53 "Legion Condor" (Note: According to Scherzer as observer in the 6./Kampfgeschwader 53 "Legion Condor".) | 22 May 1943 | — | — |
| Wilhelm Lehner | Heer | Feldwebel | Zugführer (platoon leader) in the 5./Panzergrenadier-Regiment 40 | 15 June 1943 | — | — |
| Willy Lehnert | Luftwaffe | Oberfeldwebel | Wireless/radio operator in the Stab/Kampfgeschwader 6 | 5 April 1944 | — | — |
| Ernst-Günter Lehnhoff | Heer | Major | Commander of Panzer-Füsilier-Bataillon/Führer-Grenadier-Brigade | 12 December 1944 | — | — |
| Herbert Lehrig | Heer | Leutnant | Zugführer (platoon leader) in the II./Grenadier-Regiment 161 | 10 September 1944 | — | — |
| Alois Lehrkinder | Heer | Feldwebel | Zugführer (platoon leader) in the 7./Grenadier-Regiment 447 | 3 April 1943 | — | — |
| Günther Lehrter | Heer | Leutnant of the Reserves | Zugführer (platoon leader) in the 5./Panzergrenader-Regiment 27 | 2 September 1944 | — | — |
| Walter Lehweß-Litzmann | Luftwaffe | Oberstleutnant | Geschwaderkommodore of Kampfgeschwader 3 "Lützow" (Note: According to Scherzer as Geschwaderkommodore of Kampfgeschwader 3.) | 29 October 1943 | — | |
| Gerhard Leibnitz | Luftwaffe | Oberleutnant | Pilot and observer in the 2.(N)/Aufklärungs-Gruppe 5 | 14 January 1945 | — | — |
| Helmut Leicht+ | Luftwaffe | Hauptmann (Note: According to Scherzer as Oberleutnant.) | Staffelkapitän of the 2./Sturzkampfgeschwader 77 | 3 September 1942 | Awarded 631st Oak Leaves 24 October 1944 | — |
| Erich Leie | Luftwaffe | Oberleutnant | Pilot in the Stab of I./Jagdgeschwader 2 "Richthofen" (Note: According to Scherzer as pilot in the Stab/Jagdgeschwader 2 "Richthofen".) | 1 August 1941 | — | — |
| Karl Leimbach | Heer | Oberfeldwebel | Leader of the 7./Grenadier-Regiment 1 | 17 March 1945 | — | — |
| Helmut Leimkuhl | Heer | Leutnant of the Reserves | Leader of the 7./Grenadier-Regiment 756 | 26 November 1944* | Killed in action 20 October 1944 | — |
| Ludwig Leingärtner | Luftwaffe | Hauptmann | Staffelkapitän of the 2./Sturzkampfgeschwader 1 | 5 February 1944 | — | — |
| Ludwig Leinhos | Heer | Oberleutnant | Chief of the 6./Panzer-Regiment 18 | 5 February 1942 | — | — |
| Hellmut von Leipzig | Heer | Leutnant of the Reserves | Zugführer (platoon leader) in Panzer-Aufklärungs-Abteilung "Brandenburg" | 28 April 1945 | — | |
| Helmut Leitenberger | Luftwaffe | Leutnant | Zugführer (platoon leader) in the 3./Fallschirm-Panzer-Regiment "Hermann Göring" | 17 April 1945 | — | — |
| Dr. Leopold Leitner | Heer | Major | Leader of Grenadier-Regiment 132 | 24 December 1944 | — | — |
| Armin Lembke | Heer | Oberstleutnant | Commander of Grenadier-Regiment 220 | 5 March 1945 | — | — |
| Gerhard Lemcke | Heer | Oberstleutnant | Commander of Grenadier-Regiment 89 | 12 January 1945 | — | — |
| Joachim Lemelsen+ | Heer | General der Panzertruppe | Commanding general of the XXXXVII. Panzerkorps | 27 July 1941 | Awarded 294th Oak Leaves 7 September 1943 | |
| Fritz Lemke | Heer | Hauptmann | Leader of the II./Grenadier-Regiment 3 (Note: According to Scherzer as commander of the I./Grenadier-Regiment 3.) | 16 February 1944 | — | — |
| Gerhard Lemke | Heer | Feldwebel | Company troop leader in the 7./Grenadier-Regiment 82 | 28 April 1943 | — | — |
| Max Lemke | Heer | Major (Note: According to Scherzer as Major (Ergänzungsoffizier—Supplementary Officer). Supplementary Officers were officers of the former army or Reichsheer, who were re-hired during the expansion of the Wehrmacht.) | Commander of Aufklärungs-Abteilung 17 | 18 October 1941 | — | — |
| Siegfried Lemke | Luftwaffe | Leutnant | Staffelführer of the 1./Jagdgeschwader 2 "Richthofen" (Note: According to Scherzer on 11 June 1944 as Staffelführer in the I./Jagdgeschwader 2 "Richthofen".) | 14 June 1944 | — | |
| Wilhelm Lemke+ | Luftwaffe | Leutnant | Staffelführer of the 9./Jagdgeschwader 3 "Udet" (Note: According to Scherzer as pilot in the 8./Jagdgeschwader 3 "Udet".) | 12 September 1942 (Note: According to Scherzer on 19 September 1942.) | Awarded 338th Oak Leaves 25 November 1943 | — |
| Heinz-Georg Lemm+ | Heer | Hauptmann | Commander of the I./Füsilier-Regiment 27 | 14 April 1943 | Awarded 525th Oak Leaves 11 July 1944; 137th Swords 15 March 1945 | |
| Fritz-Julius Lemp | Kriegsmarine | Kapitänleutnant | Commander of U-30 | 14 August 1940 | — | |
| Otto Lempp | Heer | Hauptmann of the Reserves | Chief of the 2./Panzer-Artillerie-Regiment 75 | 14 May 1944 | — | — |
| Wilhelm von Lengerke | Heer | Oberstleutnant | Commander of the I./Reiter-Regiment 1 | 31 August 1941 | — | — |
| Horst Lenkeit | Heer | Hauptmann | Commander of the I./Grenadier-Regiment 1076 | 3 November 1944 | — | — |
| Hans Lennartz? (Note: Hans Lennartz's nomination by his unit was received by the Heerespersonalamt (HPA—Army Staff Office) on 13 April 1945. Major Joachim Domaschk approved the nomination on 14 April. A Heerespersonalamt-Verleihungsvorschlag (HPA-VV—Army Staff Office Nomination Recommendation) Nr. 5083 was created and forwarded on 19 April. Wilhelm Burgdorf approved the nomination on 20 April but did not present it to Adolf Hitler. The nomination was left unfinished in Burgdorf's office in the Führerbunker at Reich Chancellery and was later taken as a souvenir by a US officer. The author Veit Scherzer received a copy of the nomination from the United States in 2007. According to the Association of Knight's Cross Recipients (AKCR) the award was presented in accordance with the Dönitz-decree. This is illegal according to the Deutsche Dienststelle (WASt) and lacks legal justification. The presentation date was assigned by Walther-Peer Fellgiebel.) | Heer | Hauptmann | Leader of Alarm-Bataillon Kolberg | 9 May 1945 | — | — |
| Helmut Lent+ | Luftwaffe | Oberleutnant | Staffelkapitän of the 6./Nachtjagdgeschwader 1 (Note: According to Scherzer as Staffelkapitän of the 4./Nachtjagdgeschwader 1) | 30 August 1941 | Awarded 98th Oak Leaves 6 June 1942; 32nd Swords 2 August 1943; 15th Diamonds 31 July 1944 | |
| Heinrich Lenz | Heer | Oberfeldwebel | Zugführer (platoon leader) in the 1./Grenadier-Regiment 159 | 26 December 1943 | — | — |
| Hermann Lenz | Heer | Oberstleutnant | Commander of Grenadier-Regiment 164 | 9 February 1943 | — | — |
| Martin Lenz | Heer | Major | Commander of the I.(Schützenpanzerwagen)/Panzergrenader-Regiment 192 (Note: According to Scherzer as commander of the I.(gepanzert)/Panzergrenader-Regiment 192.) | 25 January 1945 | — | — |
| Fritz Leopold | Luftwaffe | Oberleutnant | Staffelkapitän of the 5./Kampfgeschwader 3 "Lützow" | 26 March 1944* | Killed in action 5 November 1943 | — |
| Josef Leopoldsberger | Heer | Feldwebel | Zugführer (platoon leader) in the 1./Infanterie-Regiment 207 | 14 March 1942 | — | — |
| Erich Lepkowski | Luftwaffe | Leutnant | Leader of the 5./Fallschirmjäger-Regiment 2 | 8 August 1944 | — | — |
| Richard Lepper | Heer | Oberst | Artilleriekommandeur 6 and leader of a Kampfgruppe (Note: According to Scherzer as Artilleriekommandeur 6 and leader of a Kampfgruppe of the XI. Armeekorps in the Stalingrad pocket.) | 17 December 1942 | — | — |
| Richard Leppla | Luftwaffe | Hauptmann | Gruppenkommandeur of the III./Jagdgeschwader 51 | 27 July 1941 | — | |
| Jacques Leroy? (Note: No evidence regarding Jacques Leroy's nomination can be found in the German Federal Archives. A presentation, as assumed by Walther-Peer Fellgiebel, by the chief of the Heerespersonalamt (HPA—Army Staff Office) Wilhelm Burgdorf, is very unlikely because the 28th SS Volunteer Grenadier Division Wallonien was deployed in Pomerania with the Army Group Vistula in March/April 1945 and not in or near Berlin. The author was denied access to files, which could help clarify the case, of the Association of Knight's Cross Recipients (AKCR) on the grounds of the Bundesarchivgesetz (German Archive Law). The presentation, according to Krätschmer, was confirmed by the former adjutant to the divisional commander in 1957 and divisional commander in 1973. Fellgiebel himself, in a letter dated 31 August 1976, considered this evidence as Quatsch (a hoke or nuts). Leroy was a member of the AKCR.) | Waffen-SS | SS-Untersturmführer | Leader of the 1./SS-Freiwilligen-Panzergrenader-Regiment 69 | 20 April 1945 | — | — |
| Dipl.-Ing. Karl Freiherr von Lersner | Heer | Oberst | Commander of Grenadier-Regiment 537 | 12 March 1943* | Killed in action 25 January 1943 | — |
| Alexander Leschke | Heer | Major of the Reserves | Commander of the II./Infanterie-Regiment 11 (motorized) | 4 November 1941 | — | — |
| Martin Leske | Heer | Hauptmann | Commander of the I./Jäger-Regiment 49 | 19 August 1944 | — | — |
| Karl Lestmann | Heer | Hauptmann | Commander of the II./Panzer-Regiment 15 | 25 January 1943 | — | — |
| Waldemar Lethaus | Heer | Hauptmann | Commander of Panzergrenadier-Bataillon 2103 | 9 December 1944 | — | — |
| Karl-Otto Leukefeld | Heer | Oberleutnant | Chief of the 1./Infanterie-Regiment 123 | 23 October 1941 | — | — |
| Otto Leupert | Luftwaffe | Oberfeldwebel | Pilot in the I.(K)/Lehrgeschwader 1 (Note: According to Scherzer as pilot in the 1.(K)/Lehrgeschwader 1.) | 22 January 1943 | — | — |
| Alois Leuschner | Heer | Leutnant | Leader of Pionier-Kompanie/Jäger-Regiment 83 | 2 September 1944 | — | — |
| Kurt Leuschner | Heer | Hauptmann | Leader of the III./Schützen-Regiment 25 | 27 October 1941 | — | — |
| Erich von Lewinski+, called Erich von Manstein | Heer | General der Infanterie | Commanding general of the XXXVIII. Armeekorps | 19 July 1940 | Awarded 209th Oak Leaves 14 March 1943; 59th Swords 30 March 1944 | |
| Alfred Lex | Waffen-SS | SS-Hauptsturmführer of the Reserves | Leader of the I./SS-Panzergrenader-Regiment 4 "Der Führer" | 10 December 1943 | — | — |
| Hans Lex | Heer | Oberleutnant of the Reserves | Chief of the 7./Panzer-Regiment "Großdeutschland" | 10 September 1943 | — | — |
| Siegfried Leyck | Heer | Hauptmann | Commander of the III./Panzer-Füsilier-Regiment "Großdeutschland" | 17 December 1943* | Died of wounds 7 July 1943 | — |
| Karl-Heinz Leypold | Heer | Hauptmann of the Reserves | Chief of the 4./Grenadier-Regiment 347 | 11 April 1944 | — | — |
| Ernst von Leyser | Heer | Generalmajor | Commander of the 269. Infanterie-Division | 18 September 1941 | — | |
| Hans-Georg Leyser | Heer | Oberst | Commander of Infanterie-Regiment 51 (motorized) | 3 May 1942 | — | — |
| Walter Lichel | Heer | Generalleutnant | Commander of the 123. Infanterie-Division | 18 September 1941 | — | — |
| Karl-Heinz Lichte? (Note: No evidence of the award can be found in the German Federal Archives. According to Walther-Peer Fellgiebel the Knight's Cross was presented by SS-Oberstgruppenführer Sepp Dietrich, which would make it an unlawful presentation. Fellgiebel provides his sources as Hermann Buch, the former IIa (personnel administration) of the 2. SS-Division "Das Reich", and Wilhelm Kment, the adjutant of Heinrich Himmler and liaison officer to the Heerespersonalamt (HPA—Army Staff Office). Buch had nothing to do with this presentation (note from 25 June 2004). The 5th SS Panzer Division Wiking was not under the command of Dietrich in the respective timeframe. Krätschmer provides a presentation date of 25 March 1945 while von Seemen provides 25 April 1945. Fellgiebel has changed this to 6 May 1945. It has to be speculated whether Fellgiebel did this to hide the presentation among the Dietrich award. Karl-Heinz Lichte, a member of the Association of Knight's Cross Recipients (AKCR), did nothing to help clarify the situation. Two letters from the general manager of the AKCR had been sent to Lichte, the first on 24 July 2004 and the second on 22 August 2004.) | Waffen-SS | SS-Hauptsturmführer | Chief of the 5./SS-Panzer-Regiment 5 "Wiking" | 6 May 1945 | — | — |
| Philipp Lichtenberg | Kriegsmarine | Kapitänleutnant (Ing.) | Chief engineer on U-516 | 31 March 1945 | — | — |
| Hermann Lichtenberger | Luftwaffe | Oberst | Commander of Flak-Regiment 104 (motorized) (Note: According to Scherzer as commander of Flak-Regiment 104.) | 12 November 1941 | — | — |
| Theo-Helmut Lieb+ | Heer | Generalleutnant | Leader of the XXXXII. Armeekorps | 7 February 1944 | Awarded 400th Oak Leaves 18 February 1944 | — |
| Heinrich Liebe+ | Kriegsmarine | Kapitänleutnant | Commander of U-38 | 14 August 1940 | Awarded 13th Oak Leaves 10 June 1941 | |
| Dipl.-Ing. Gustav Freiherr von Liebenstein | Kriegsmarine | Fregattenkapitän of the Reserves | Chief of the 2. Landungsdivision and sea transportation chief of the Strait of Messina | 3 September 1943 | — | — |
| Kurt Freiherr von Liebenstein | Heer | Generalmajor | Commander of the 164. leichte Division | 10 May 1943 | — | — |
| Josef Liebenwein | Heer | Oberleutnant | Chief of the 7./Sturm-Regiment 195 | 7 April 1944 | — | — |
| Carl-August Lieberich | Heer | Major of the Reserves | Abschnittskommandant (sector commander) in the fortress St. Malô (Note: According to Scherzer as commander of the staff military supply chain management of the Channel Islands and commander of a defensive sector in the fortress St. Malô.) | 11 August 1944 | — | — |
| Gerhard Liebetrau | Heer | Unteroffizier | Group leader in the 1./Grenadier-Regiment 399 | 11 March 1945 | — | — |
| Hans Liebherr | Luftwaffe | Oberfeldwebel | Radio/wireless operator in the I./Nachtjagdgeschwader 4 | 27 July 1944 | — | — |
| Herbert Liebig | Heer | Leutnant | Leader of the 3./Panzergrenadier-Regiment 103 | 9 December 1944 | — | — |
| Walter Liebing | Luftwaffe | Major | Leader of Fallschirmjäger-Regiment 23 | 2 February 1945 | — | — |
| Franz Liebisch | Waffen-SS | SS-Obersturmführer (Note: According to Scherzer as SS-Obersturmführer of the Reserves and Oberstleutnant of the Schupo and leader of a squadron in the 8. SS-Kavallerie-Division "Florian Geyer".) | Squadron chief in the 8. SS-Kavallerie-Division "Florian Geyer" | 9 February 1945 | — | — |
| Emil Liebmann | Heer | Major | Deputy leader of Jäger-Regiment 228 (Note: According to Scherzer as leader of Jäger-Regiment 228.) | 18 November 1944 | — | — |
| Karl Liecke? (Note: No evidence of the award can be found in the German Federal Archives. Presumably the Knight's Cross was awarded on the same day as Desiderius Hampel's and Hans Hanke's, as stated in a letter from Krätschmer to von Seemen dated 7 August 1980. According to von Seemen the award was presented by General Maximilian de Angelis. Walther-Peer Fellgiebel accepted Karl Liecke as Knight's Cross recipient but noted in his book: "A justification for the presentation was not given". Liecke was a member of the Association of Knight's Cross Recipients (AKCR).) | Waffen-SS | SS-Obersturmbannführer and Oberstleutnant of the Schupo | Commander of Waffen-Grenadier-Regiment 27 der SS (Note: According to Scherzer the unit is referred to as Waffen-Gebirgsjäger-Regiment der SS 27 (kroat. Nr. 1).) | 3 May 1945 | — | — |
| Albert-Gustav Liedtke | Heer | Fahnenjunker-Oberfeldwebel | In the 6./Fahnenjunker-Regiment 1241 | 15 March 1945* | Killed in action 11 March 1945 | — |
| Bruno Liedtke (Note: According to Scherzer last name is spelled Bruno Liedtcke.) | Heer | Leutnant | Leader of the 1./Grenadier-Regiment 151 | 18 February 1945* | Killed in action 8 February 1945 | — |
| Leopold Liehl | Heer | Unteroffizier | Group leader in the 7./Panzergrenader-Regiment 10 | 31 March 1943 | — | — |
| Franz Liehr | Heer | Unteroffizier | Group leader in Panzer-Pionier-Bataillon 93 (Note: According to Scherzer as group leader in 3./Panzer-Pionier-Bataillon 93.) | 11 December 1944 | — | — |
| Detlef Lienau | Heer | Hauptmann | Commander of Panzer-Aufklärungs-Abteilung 33 | 9 May 1943 | — | — |
| Friedrich Lier+ | Heer | Major | Commander of Sturm-Bataillon AOK 6 | 3 November 1944 | Awarded (869th) Oak Leaves 8 May 1945? (Note: The OB Nordwest (Commander-in-chief North-West) submitted five approved nominations to the Führungsstab "A" (OKW/WFSt Oberkommando der Wehrmacht/Wehrmacht-Führungsstab leadership staff of the Army High Command) on 2 May 1945. Four of these nominations were submitted via teleprinter message, these were Friedrich Anding, Heinz Lotze, (Johann-)Nepomuk Stützle and Gustav Walle, and Friedrich Lier's nomination for the Oak Leaves via messenger. The reason for why not all five nominations had been submitted via teleprinter message is that Anding had destroyed six or more enemy tanks in close combat. The prerequisites of Führeranordnung (Führer decree) of 7 March 1945 had therefore been met and no further explanation or details were needed. Scherzer assumes that this must have been different in Lier's case and more details describing his actions including drawings had been created. This type of nomination was difficult to submit via teleprinter message and a messenger was sent. This nomination was never received by the Heerespersonalamt (HPA—Army Staff Office). Lier is not listed on the list of awarded Knight's Crosses, which in some cases was also used as a nomination entry list, the four nominations are listed. Also missing is the original nomination, the teleprinter messages on the other hand have prevailed. A nomination, which was never received, cannot be judged. A presentation cannot be proven. The Order Commission of the Association of Knight's Cross Recipients (AKCR) processed this case in 1975 on behalf of a relative of Lier and decided: 869th Oak Leaves yes, 8 May 1945. The sequential number and date were assigned by the AKCR. Lier was a member of the AKCR. Lier never received news about the Oak Leaves presentation before he died on 18 August 1974.) | — |
| Heinrich Liese | Heer | Wachtmeister | Zugführer (platoon leader) in the 2./Artillerie-Regiment 299 | 14 April 1943 | — | — |
| [Dr.] Kurt-Günther Liese | Heer | Hauptmann | Commander of the I./Grenadier-Regiment 309 | 16 April 1943 | — | — |
| Frank Liesendahl | Luftwaffe | Hauptmann | Staffelkapitän of the 10./Jagdgeschwader 2 "Richthofen" (Note: According to Scherzer as Staffelkapitän of the 10.(Jabo)/Jagdgeschwader 2 "Richthofen".) | 4 September 1942* | Missing in action 17 July 1942 | — |
| Kurt Lieske | Heer | Oberfeldwebel | Zugführer (platoon leader) of the II./Grenadier-Regiment 508 | 2 September 1944 | — | — |
| Helmut Ließmann | Heer | Hauptmann of the Reserves | Leader of the III./Grenadier-Regiment 731 | 3 November 1944 | — | — |
| Günter Liethmann | Heer | Hauptmann | Chief of the 3./Sturmgeschütz-Abteilung 237 | 26 October 1943 | — | — |
| Arnold Lignitz | Luftwaffe | Oberleutnant | Gruppenkommandeur of the III./Jagdgeschwader 54 | 5 November 1940 | — | — |
| Helmut von Lilienhoff-Zwowitzki | Heer | Oberst | Commander of Grenadier-Regiment 439 | 14 August 1943 | — | — |
| Diedrich Lilienthal | Heer | Unteroffizier | Pak gun leader in the 1.(schwere)/Schnelle-Abteilung 290 (Note: According to Scherzer as gun leader of a PAK in the 1./Schnelle-Abteilung 290.) | 2 April 1943 | — | — |
| Johannes Limbach | Kriegsmarine | Leutnant zur See | 1st watch officer on U-181 | 6 February 1945 | — | — |
| Enno-Erich von Limburg-Hetlingen? (Note: There is no evidence of a nomination or presentation of the Knight's Cross to Enno-Erich von Limburg-Hetlingen in the German Federal Archives. The files of the order commission of the Association of Knight's Cross Recipients (AKCR) hold no record of Von Limburg-Hetlingen's case. His personal files also hold no proof. Von Seemen states as a source: "Informed by the head of OKW/PA/P5 Oberst Steuer". The family owns a copy of a written testimony from General Hans Kreysing dated 15 April 1945, which indicates that Kreysing had nominated Von Limburg-Hetlingen for the Knight's Cross in early April 1945. Von Limburg-Hetlingen had been mentioned in the daily Wehrmachtbericht (armed forces report) on 7 April 1945. The nomination for the Knight's Cross did not survive the war and its receipt cannot be verified. There is no record in the book "Verliehene Ritterkreuze" (Awarded Knight Crosses). A Heerespersonalamt-Verleihungsvorschlag (HPA-VV—Army Staff Office Nomination Recommendation) was not created. The presentation date is an assumption of the AKCR.) | Heer | Oberst | Commander of Grenadier-Regiment 731 | 3 May 1945 | — | — |
| Hans Limmer | Heer | Oberfeldwebel | Reconnaissance troop leader in the 1.(Panzerspäh)/Panzer-Aufklärungs-Abteilung 7 (Note: According to Scherzer as reconnaissance troop leader in the 1./Panzer-Aufklärungs-Abteilung 7.) | 27 October 1941 | — | — |
| Rudolf Linde | Heer | Major | Commander of the II./Grenadier-Regiment 410 | 8 May 1945 (Note: According to Scherzer on 5 May 1945.) | — | — |
| Ernst Lindemann | Kriegsmarine | Kapitän zur See | Commander of battleship Bismarck | 27 December 1941* | Killed in action 27 May 1941 | |
| Fritz Lindemann? (Note: In absence from the proceedings, the fleeing Fritz Lindemann was deprived of all honors, ranks and orders and dishonourably discharged from the Heer on 4 August 1944, in connection with the 20 July plot, the failed attempt to assassinate Adolf Hitler. He died before his case was brought before the Volksgerichtshof (People's Court).) | Heer | Oberst | Artilleriekommandeur 138 | 4 September 1941 | — | |
| Georg Lindemann+ | Heer | Generalleutnant | Commander of the 36. Infanterie-Division | 5 August 1940 | Awarded 275th Oak Leaves 21 August 1943 | |
| Gerhard Lindemann+ | Heer | Oberst | Commander of Infanterie-Regiment 216 | 25 January 1943 | Awarded 580th Oak Leaves 10 September 1944 | — |
| Karl-Wilhelm Lindemann | Heer | Leutnant | Zugführer (platoon leader) in the 5./Panzer-Regiment 29 | 14 April 1945 | — | — |
| Max Lindemann | Heer | Rittmeister of the Reserves | Leader of the I./Grenadier-Regiment 48 | 11 March 1945 | — | — |
| Hans Lindenau | Heer | Oberfeldwebel | Tasked with the leadership of the 1./Grenadier-Regiment 1 (Note: According to Scherzer as leader of the 1./Grenadier-Regiment 1.) | 17 March 1945 | — | — |
| Usdau (Daniel) Lindenau? (Note: Major Joachim Domaschk responded on 26 March 1945 to an inquiry dated 19 March 1945 of the Heeresgruppe Süd, department IIa (divisional adjutant for personnel matters of the officers): "A nomination for the Knight's Cross for Oberstleutnant im Generalstab Lindenau has not been submitted. The Knight's Cross was not awarded to him." Presumably the presentation date was assigned by the Association of Knight's Cross Recipients (AKCR). Lindenau was a member of the AKCR.) | Heer | Oberstleutnant im Generalstab (in the General Staff) | Chief of staff of the IX. SS-Gebirgskorps | 10 February 1945 | — | — |
| Friedrich Lindenberg | Heer | Oberleutnant | Leader of the 5./Panzergrenader-Regiment 63 | 30 January 1943 | — | — |
| Herbert Lindenblatt? (Note: No evidence regarding the presentation of the Knight's Cross of the Iron Cross to Herbert Lindenblatt can be found in the German Federal Archives. According to Von Seemen and Walther-Peer Fellgiebel in compliance with the empowerment for autonomous presentations by Heeresgruppe E. There is no evidence in the files of the order commission of the Association of Knight's Cross Recipients (AKCR). Veit Scherzer states that he has no clue on what grounds the AKCR accepted Lindenblatt.) | Heer | Oberstleutnant | Commander of Jäger-Regiment 750 | 3 May 1945 | — | — |
| Viktor Lindenmann | Heer | Leutnant | Adjutant in the III./Infanterie-Regiment 124 | 21 September 1941 | — | — |
| Hermann Linder | Heer | Oberfeldwebel | Zugführer (platoon leader) and aide-de-camp in the II./Jäger-Regiment 207 | 19 June 1943 | — | — |
| Heinrich Linderkamp | Heer | Major | Commander of the III.(Jäger)/Grenadier-Regiment 17 | 24 December 1944 | — | — |
| Werner Lindhorst | Heer | Hauptmann of the Reserves | Chief of the 8.(MG)/Grenadier-Regiment 89 (Note: According to Scherzer as chief of the 8./Grenadier-Regiment 89.) | 23 February 1944 | — | — |
| Max Lindig | Heer | Generalleutnant | Höherer Artilleriekommandeur 307 | 27 July 1944 | — | — |
| Eduard Lindinger | Luftwaffe | Feldwebel | Pilot in the 7./Kampfgeschwader 1 "Hindenburg" | 9 December 1942 | — | — |
| Alois Lindmayr | Luftwaffe | Hauptmann | Staffelkapitän of the 7./Kampfgeschwader 76 | 21 July 1940 | — | — |
| Alfred Lindner | Heer | Unteroffizier | Zugführer (platoon leader) in the 9./Grenadier-Regiment 12 | 18 January 1945 | — | — |
| Anton Lindner | Heer | Wachtmeister | Zugführer (platoon leader) in the 3./Divisions-Füsilier-Bataillon 36 (Note: According to Scherzer as Zugführer (platoon leader) in the 3./Divisions-Füsilier-Bataillon (A.A.) 36.) | 17 March 1944 | — | — |
| Anton Lindner | Luftwaffe | Leutnant | Pilot in the Stabsstaffel/Jagdgeschwader 51 "Mölders" (Note: According to Scherzer as pilot in the I./Jagdgeschwader 51 "Mölders".) | 8 April 1944 | — | — |
| Gerhard Lindner | Heer | Generalmajor | Commander of the 346. Infanterie-Division | 5 May 1945 | — | — |
| Herbert Lindner | Heer | Unteroffizier | Group leader in the 6./Panzergrenader-Regiment 60 | 28 July 1943 | — | — |
| Kurt Lindner | Heer | Feldwebel | Zugführer (platoon leader) in the 11./Grenadier-Regiment 1055 | 9 December 1944 | — | — |
| Martin Lindner | Heer | Oberleutnant | Chief of the 7./Jäger-Regiment 741 | 21 January 1945* | Killed in action 2 December 1944 | — |
| Otto Lindner | Heer | Major | Leader of the II./Infanterie-Regiment 60 (motorized) | 19 March 1942 | — | — |
| Hans Lingner | Heer | Oberleutnant | Chief of the 7./Infanterie-Regiment 65 | 24 June 1940 | — | — |
| Gottfried Linke | Heer | Hauptmann | Commander of the Heeres-Pionier-Bataillon 44 (motorized) (Note: According to Scherzer as commander of the Heeres-Pionier-Bataillon 44.) | 1 March 1945 | — | — |
| Lothar Linke | Luftwaffe | Oberleutnant | Staffelführer of the 12./Nachtjagdgeschwader 1 (Note: According to Scherzer as Staffelkapitän of the 12./Nachtjagdgeschwader 1.) | 19 September 1943* | Killed in parachute accident 14 May 1943 | — |
| Richard Linke | Luftwaffe | Hauptmann | Gruppenkommandeur of the I./Kampfgeschwader 54 | 17 September 1941 | — | — |
| Walter Linke | Luftwaffe | Oberfeldwebel | Wireless/radio operator in the 3./Schlachtgeschwader 2 "Immelmann" | 16 December 1944 | — | — |
| Rudi Linz | Luftwaffe | Leutnant | Pilot in the 12./Jagdgeschwader 5 | 12 March 1945* | Killed in action 9 February 1945 (Note: According to Scherzer on 17 February 1945.) | — |
| Karl-Hermann Lion | Luftwaffe | Oberleutnant (Note: According to Scherzer as Oberleutnant of the Reserves.) | Staffelkapitän of the 9./Sturzkampfgeschwader 1 | 4 June 1942 | — | — |
| Helmut Lipfert+ | Luftwaffe | Leutnant of the Reserves (Note: According to Scherzer as Leutnant (war officer).) | Staffelführer of the 6./Jagdgeschwader 52 | 5 April 1944 | Awarded 837th Oak Leaves 17 April 1945 | — |
| Dr.-Ing. Hans Lipinski | Waffen-SS | SS-Obersturmführer of the Reserves | Leader of the 1./SS-Flak-Abteilung 18 | 2 January 1945 | — | — |
| Hans-Hermann Lipp | Luftwaffe | Hauptmann | Battalion leader in Fallschirmjäger-Regiment "Hübner" (Note: According to Scherzer as battalion leader in Fallschirmjäger-Regiment "Hübner" [alarm unit; deployed in Arnhem] who was killed in action on 10 September 1944.) | 31 October 1944* | Killed in action 11 September 1944 | — |
| Karl Lipp | Luftwaffe | Oberfeldwebel | Pilot in the 4./Kampfgeschwader 55 | 16 November 1942 | — | — |
| Hans Lippe (Note: According to Scherzer first name is "Gottfried Rudolph" and the Knight's Cross of the Iron Cross was dated on 28 February 1945.) | Luftwaffe | Leutnant | Zugführer (platoon leader) in Fallschirm-Panzergrenader-Regiment 1 "Hermann Göring" | 26 March 1945* | Killed in action 16 January 1945 | — |
| Egmont Prinz zur Lippe-Weißenfeld+ | Luftwaffe | Oberleutnant | Staffelkapitän of the 5./Nachtjagdgeschwader 2 | 16 April 1942 | Awarded 263rd Oak Leaves 2 August 1943 | |
| Rudolf Lippelt? (Note: Rudolf Lippelt's nomination was received by the Heerespersonalamt (HPA—Army Staff Office) on 15 April 1945. A file card in the registry for approved or rejected nominations was created. Major Joachim Domaschk requested a statement from one of Lippelt's commanding officers in the command chain on 15 April. Major Domaschk approved the nomination on 7 May 1945 and noted: "Knight's Cross yes". There is no evidence that this nomination was further processed. According to the Association of Knight's Cross Recipients (AKCR) the award was presented in accordance with the Dönitz-decree. This is illegal according to the Deutsche Dienststelle (WASt) and lacks legal justification. The presentation date was assigned by Walther-Peer Fellgiebel.) | Heer | Major | Commander of the II./Artillerie-Regiment 371 | 9 May 1945 | — | — |
| Walter Lippelt? (Note: According to Scherzer Walter Lippelt never existed. The radio transmission must have been distorted and refers to Hauptmann Walter Littmann.) | Heer | Hauptmann | Leader of the I./Panzergrenader-Regiment 8 | 8 May 1945 | — | — |
| Rolf Lippert | Heer | Oberst | Commander of Panzer-Regiment 31 | 9 June 1944 | — | — |
| Wolfgang Lippert | Luftwaffe | Hauptmann | Gruppenkommandeur of the II./Jagdgeschwader 27 | 24 September 1940 | — | — |
| Walter Lippolt | Heer | Feldwebel | Zugführer (platoon leader) in the 1./Panzer-Jäger-Abteilung 240 | 4 March 1942 | — | — |
| Erhard Liss | Heer | Hauptmann | Chief of the 5./Sturm-Regiment 195 | 30 April 1945 | — | — |
| Franz List | Heer | Hauptmann | Commander of the II./Gebirgsjäger-Regiment 144 | 3 March 1943 | — | — |
| Hans List | Heer | Oberleutnant of the Reserves | Company leader in Feldersatz-Bataillon 94 | 26 December 1944 | — | — |
| Wilhelm List | Heer | Generaloberst | Commander-in-chief of the 14. Armee | 30 September 1939 | — | |
| Stefan Litjens | Luftwaffe | Oberfeldwebel | Pilot in the 4./Jagdgeschwader 53 | 21 June 1943 | — | — |
| Walter Littmann | Heer | Hauptmann | Leader of the I./Panzergrenader-Regiment 8 | 17 April 1945 | — | — |
| Erich Litzke | Heer | Oberfeldwebel | Zugführer (platoon leader) in the 2./schwere Panzer-Abteilung 509 | 20 October 1944 | — | — |
| Jakob Lobmeyer? (Note: Jakob Lobmeyer may have received a lawful presentation via the command chain via the Heerespersonalamt (HPA—Army Staff Office) Wilhelm Burgdorf in Berlin. Also probable is a direct presentation from Adolf Hitler. However, no evidence of the award can be found in the German Federal Archives. Veit Scherzer was denied access to files, which could help clarify the case, of the Association of Knight's Cross Recipients (AKCR) on the grounds of the Bundesarchivgesetz (German Archive Law). The order commission of the AKCR handled this case in 1973. In the 1980s Lobmeyer also claimed and requested to have received the German Cross in Gold as well as the Oak Leaves to the Knight's Cross. Walther-Peer Fellgiebel stated in a letter dated 17 December 1987: "Lobmeyer had never received the German Cross nor the Oak Leaves. He is already very well off that we list him under article 8 [a footnote in Fellgiebel's book] and keep things quiet, that he may have received the Knight's Cross in the timeframe 20 April to 30 April 1945." In the same letter he refers to Lobmeyer as Spinner (a wacko or crank). Ernst-Günther Krätschmer lists him with an approval date of 20 April 1945 and a presentation date of 28 April 1945. Gerhard von Seemen noted: "Presentation was made after the radio message receipt from commanding general SS-Obergruppenführer Friedrich Jeckeln of the V. SS Mountain Corps." SS-Obersturmführer Lobmeyer had been nominated for the Honor Roll in March by the Heeresgruppe Mitte. This nomination had been approved but the presentation was never made. Lobmeyer was a member of the AKCR.) | Waffen-SS | SS-Hauptsturmführer | Commander of SS-Jäger-Panzer-Abteilung 561 | 28 April 1945 | — | — |
| Herbert Loch | Heer | Generalleutnant | Commander of the 17. Infanterie-Division | 16 June 1940 | — | — |
| Heinrich Lodtka | Heer | Oberfeldwebel | Zugführer (platoon leader) in the 8.(MG)/Grenadier-Regiment 82 (Note: According to Scherzer as Zugführer (platoon leader) in the 8./Grenadier-Regiment 82.) | 27 September 1943 | — | — |
| Walter Loebel | Luftwaffe | Oberstleutnant im Generalstab (in the General Staff) (Note: According to Scherzer as Oberstleutnant.) | Geschwaderkommodore of Kampfgeschwader 30 | 29 July 1940 | — | — |
| Gottfried Freiherr Loebenstein von Aigenhorst | Heer | Oberleutnant of the Reserves | Chief of the 13.(IG)/Grenadier-Regiment 133 (Note: According to Scherzer as chief of the 13./Grenadier-Regiment 133.) | 30 April 1943* | Killed in action 22 April 1943 | — |
| Rudolf Löchner | Heer | Oberleutnant of the Reserves | Leader of the 3.(schwere)/Schnelle-Abteilung 161 (Note: According to Scherzer as leader of the 3./Schnelle-Abteilung 161.) | 5 July 1943 | — | — |
| Günther Löffelbein | Luftwaffe | Oberleutnant | Staffelkapitän in the I./Kampfgeschwader 51 | 19 September 1943 | — | — |
| Alfred Löffler | Heer | Unteroffizier | Zugführer (platoon leader) in the 1./Grenadier-Regiment 487 | 20 April 1943 | — | — |
| Emil Löffler | Heer | Oberfeldwebel | Zugführer (platoon leader) in the 4.(MG)/Grenadier-Regiment 460 (Note: According to Scherzer as Zugführer (platoon leader) in the 4./Grenadier-Regiment 460.) | 12 November 1943* | Killed in action 25 October 1943 | — |
| Erich Löffler | Heer | Hauptmann | Commander of the II./Infanterie-Regiment 57 | 7 October 1942 | — | |
| Rolf Loeffler | Heer | Hauptmann | Chief of the 10./Infanterie-Regiment 70 | 14 September 1942 | — | — |
| Alexander Löhr+ | Luftwaffe | General der Flieger | Chief of Luftflotte 4 | 30 September 1939 | Awarded 705th Oak Leaves 20 January 1945 | |
| Erich Löhr | Heer | Oberst | Deputy leader of the 121. Infanterie-Division (Note: According to Scherzer as leader of the 121. Infanterie-Division.) | 12 August 1944 | — | — |
| Friedrich-Wilhelm von Loeper | Heer | Generalleutnant | Commander of the 10. Infanterie-Division (motorized) | 29 September 1941 | — | — |
| Wilhelm Loer | Heer | Oberleutnant of the Reserves | Leader of the I./Grenadier-Regiment 311 | 26 December 1943 | — | — |
| Heinrich Löring | Heer | Leutnant of the Reserves | Adjutant in the Panzer-Aufklärungs-Abteilung 118 | 7 April 1944 | — | — |
| Bruno Loerzer | Luftwaffe | Generalleutnant | Commanding general of the II. Fliegerkorps | 29 May 1940 | — | |
| Ernst Loesch | Heer | Major | Commander of the I./Panzergrenader-Regiment 1 | 14 May 1944 | — | — |
| Hans von Lösecke | Heer | Hauptmann | Commander of the III./Grenadier-Regiment 90 (motorized) | 8 February 1943 | — | — |
| Hans-Joachim Löser | Heer | Hauptmann | Commander of the III./Füsilier-Regiment 230 | 20 January 1943 | — | — |
| Werner Lösing | Heer | Gefreiter | Rifle leader in the 12.(MG)/Grenadier-Regiment 67 (Note: According to Scherzer as rifle leader in the 12./Grenadier-Regiment 67.) | 29 February 1944 | — | — |
| Erich Löwe+ | Heer | Hauptmann | Chief of the 3./Panzer-Abteilung 65 | 4 September 1940 | Awarded 385th Oak Leaves 8 February 1944 | |
| Dipl.-Ing. Kurt Loewer | Kriegsmarine | Korvettenkapitän of the Reserves | Chief of the 11. Vorpostenflottille | 24 June 1944 | — | — |
| Karl Löwrick+ | Heer | Oberstleutnant | Commander of the III./Infanterie-Regiment 272 | 5 August 1940 | Awarded 247th Oak Leaves 17 May 1943 | — |
| Hanns-Heinrich Lohmann+ | Waffen-SS | SS-Sturmbannführer | Commander of the III./SS-Freiwilligen-Panzergrenader-Regiment 23 "Norge" | 12 March 1944 | Awarded (872nd) Oak Leaves 9 May 1945? (Note: The nomination was received by the Heerespersonalamt (HPA—Army Staff Office) on 25 March 1943 and was approved by the commanding general of the III. (germ.) SS-Panzerkorps. However, the approval from the commander-in-chief of the 11. Armee, Army Group Vistula and from the Reichsführer-SS is missing. The HPA created a formal nomination without a sequential number on 27 March 1945. Both nominations are retained in the National Archives. Both nominations give no information whether the nomination was approved and whether the Oak Leaves had been awarded. The nomination list of the higher grade of the Knight's Cross of the Iron Cross with Oak Leaves only dates the nomination entry on 25 March 1945. The Order Commission of the Association of Knight's Cross Recipients (AKCR) processed this case in 1974 and decided: yes, 872nd Oak Leaves. According to the AKCR the award was presented in accordance with the Dönitz-decree. This is illegal according to the Deutsche Dienststelle (WASt) and lacks legal justification. The sequential number "872" and date were assigned by the AKCR. Hanns-Heinrich Lohmann was a member of the AKCR.) | — |
| Hans-Georg Lohmeyer | Luftwaffe | Leutnant | Staffelführer of the 6./Schlachtgeschwader 77 (Note: According to Scherzer as Staffelführer in the II./Schlachtgeschwader 77.) | 6 October 1944 | — | — |
| Karl Lohmeyer | Heer | Oberst | Commander of Infanterie-Regiment 505 | 15 July 1941 | — | — |
| Christian Lohrey | Heer | Gefreiter | Company troop messenger in the 3./Panzergrenader-Regiment 41 | 11 March 1945 | — | — |
| Martin Lohß | Heer | Hauptmann | Commander of the I./Füsilier-Regiment 34 | 28 July 1944 | — | — |
| Lambert Loibl | Heer | Obergefreiter | Richtschütze (gunner) in the 1./Panzergrenader-Regiment 33 | 9 June 1944 | — | — |
| Gustav Lombard | Waffen-SS | SS-Obersturmbannführer (Note: According to Scherzer as SS-Obersturmbannführer of the Reserves.) | Commander of SS-Kavallerie-Regiment 1 | 10 March 1943 | — | |
| Georg Loos | Heer | Leutnant (Note: According to Scherzer as Leutnant of the Reserves.) | Zugführer (platoon leader) in the 1./Pionier-Bataillon 152 | 23 November 1941 | — | — |
| Gerhard Loos | Luftwaffe | Leutnant | Staffelführer of the 8./Jagdgeschwader 54 (Note: According to Scherzer as pilot in the 1./Jagdgeschwader 54.) | 5 February 1944 | — | — |
| Walter Loos | Heer | Oberleutnant | Leader of the III./Grenadier-Regiment 130 | 31 March 1943 | — | — |
| Walter Loos | Luftwaffe | Oberfeldwebel | Pilot in the Stab/Jagdgeschwader 300 | 20 April 1945 | — | — |
| Wilhelm Loos | Heer | Oberleutnant | Chief of the 10./Grenadier-Regiment 76 (motorized) | 21 April 1944 | — | — |
| Otto Loose | Heer | Unteroffizier | Gun leader in the 14.(Panzerjäger)/Grenadier-Regiment 507 (Note: According to Scherzer as gun leader in the 14./Grenadier-Regiment 507.) | 4 November 1943 | — | |
| Anton Lorch | Heer | Oberstleutnant | Commander of Gebirgsjäger-Regiment 144 | 4 June 1944 | — | — |
| Herbert Lorch | Luftwaffe | Major | Gruppenkommandeur of the II./Kampfgeschwader 1 "Hindenburg" | 5 January 1943* | Killed in action 19 August 1942 | — |
| Alfred Lorenz | Heer | Feldwebel | Aide-de-camp of the 7./Grenadier-Regiment 485 | 4 October 1944 | — | — |
| Erich Lorenz+ | Heer | Major of the Reserves | Commander of the I./Grenadier-Regiment 287 | 14 November 1943 | Awarded 467th Oak Leaves 4 May 1944 | — |
| Franz Lorenz | Heer | Leutnant | Leader of 5./Grenadier-Regiment 586 | 4 May 1944 | — | — |
| Friedrich Lorenz | Luftwaffe | Hauptmann | Staffelkapitän of the 1./Sturzkampfgeschwader 1 | 31 July 1943* | Killed in action 17 July 1943 | — |
| Herbert Lorenz | Heer | Oberfeldwebel | Zugführer (platoon leader) in the 4.(MG)/Grenadier-Regiment 530 (Note: According to Scherzer as Zugführer (platoon leader) in the 4./Grenadier-Regiment 530.) | 4 May 1944 | — | — |
| Karl Lorenz+ | Heer | Major | Commander of Pionier-Bataillon "Großdeutschland" | 17 December 1942 | Awarded 395th Oak Leaves 12 February 1944 | — |
| Wilhelm Lorenz | Heer | Oberst | Commander of Infanterie-Regiment 376 | 28 December 1942 | — | — |
| Bernhard Lorenzen | Heer | Hauptmann of the Reserves | Commander of the I./Grenadier-Regiment 121 | 3 April 1943 | — | — |
| Karl Lorenzen | Heer | Feldwebel | Zugführer (platoon leader) in the 7./Grenadier-Regiment 377 | 9 December 1944 | — | — |
| Artur Lorfing? (Note: Artur Lorfing's nomination was received by the Heerespersonalamt (HPA—Army Staff Office) as a teleprinter message between 14 and 16 May 1945. Major Joachim Domaschk sent a teleprinter message to the Heeresgruppe C on 16 May asking why Lorfing was being nominated three and a half months after the deed. The response indicated that apparently Lorfing had already been nominated for the first time on 23 March 1945. Major Domaschk then sent a teleprinter message back to the Heeresgruppe C asking why Lorfing had been nominated almost two months after the original nomination. Domaschk never received an answer. The HPA closed down all operations on 16 May 1945. A file card in the registry for approved or rejected nominations was created, but no presentation occurred and would have been unlawful. The presentation date was assigned by Walther-Peer Fellgiebel.) | Heer | Obergefreiter | In the 1./Grenadier-Regiment 956 | 9 May 1945 | — | — |
| Fritz Losigkeit | Luftwaffe | Major | Geschwaderkommodore of Jagdgeschwader 51 "Mölders" | 28 April 1945 | — | — |
| Viktor von Loßberg | Luftwaffe | Major | Gruppenkommandeur of the III./Kampfgeschwader 26 | 17 October 1941 | — | |
| Hans Loth | Heer | Leutnant | Zugführer (platoon leader) in the 10./Infanterie-Regiment 203 (Note: According to Scherzer as leader in the 10./Infanterie-Regiment 203.) | 25 July 1942 | — | — |
| Christian Lotse (Note: Spelling of name may also be Christian Lotze.) | Luftwaffe | Oberleutnant | Battery chief in the I./Flak-Regiment 231 (motorized) (Note: According to Scherzer as chief in the 4./Flak-Regiment 231.) | 4 February 1942 | — | — |
| Hans Lotter | Luftwaffe | Oberleutnant (Note: According to Scherzer as Oberleutnant of the Reserves and observer in the Nahaufklärungsstaffel 11.(H)/Aufklärungs-Gruppe 12.) | Observer in the 11.(H)/Aufklärungs-Gruppe 12 | 28 January 1945 | — | — |
| Kurt Lottner | Heer | Oberst | Commander of Grenadier-Regiment 111 | 14 October 1943 | — | — |
| Gerhard Lotze | Waffen-SS | SS-Obersturmführer | Leader of the 5./SS-Panzergrenader-Regiment 10 "Westland" | 1 February 1945* | Killed in action 13 October 1944 | — |
| Dr. Heinz Lotze? (Note: Dr. Heinz Lotze's Heerespersonalamt-Verleihungsvorschlag (HPA-VV—Army Staff Office Nomination Recommendation) was ready for signature at the end of the war. According to the Association of Knight's Cross Recipients (AKCR) the award was presented in accordance with the Dönitz-decree. This is illegal according to the Deutsche Dienststelle (WASt) and lacks legal justification. The presentation date was assigned by Walther-Peer Fellgiebel. Lotze was member of the AKCR.) | Heer | Hauptmann of the Reserves | Leader of the I./Panzergrenader-Regiment "Kahle" (Panzer-Truppen-Schule Bergen) in the Kampfgruppe "Grosan" | 9 May 1945 | — | — |
| Willi Lublow | Heer | Obergefreiter | Group leader in the 14./Grenadier-Regiment 284 | 27 July 1944 | — | — |
| Werner Lucas | Luftwaffe | Feldwebel | Pilot in the 4./Jagdgeschwader 3 "Udet" | 19 September 1942 | — | — |
| Ernst Lucht | Kriegsmarine | Konteradmiral | Befehlshaber der Sicherung der Nordsee (Commander-in-Chief of the security of the North Sea) | 17 January 1945 | — | |
| Walter Lucht+ (Note: According to Scherzer name is spelled Walther Lucht.) | Heer | Generalleutnant | Commander of the 336. Infanterie-Division | 30 January 1943 | Awarded 691st Oak Leaves 9 January 1945 | |
| Günter Luchtenberg | Luftwaffe | Stabsfeldwebel | Observer in the 2.(H)/Aufklärungs-Gruppe 6 (Note: According to Scherzer as observer in the 2./Nahaufklärungsgruppe 6.) | 6 December 1944 | — | — |
| Hans-Ulrich von Luck und Witten | Heer | Major | Leader of Panzergrenadier-Regiment 125 | 8 August 1944 | — | — |
| Claus von Lucke | Heer | Leutnant (Note: According to Scherzer as Leutnant of the Reserves.) | Zugführer (platoon leader) in the 9./Panzer-Regiment 18 | 31 August 1941 | — | — |
| Erich Luckmann | Luftwaffe | Obergefreiter | Gun leader in the 3./Flak-Regiment 241 (motorized) (Note: According to Scherzer as gun leader in the 2./Flak-Regiment 241.) | 21 December 1942 | — | — |
| Alfons Luczny | Luftwaffe | Generalleutnant | Commander of the 2. Flak-Division (motorized) (Note: According to Scherzer as commander of the 2. Flak-Division.) | 9 June 1944 | — | — |
| Günter Ludigkeit | Luftwaffe | Oberleutnant | Staffelkapitän of the 5./Sturzkampfgeschwader 77 | 26 March 1944 | — | — |
| Hermann Ludin | Heer | Hauptmann of the Reserves | Leader of the II./Grenadier-Regiment 290 | 23 October 1944 | — | — |
| Franz Ludwig | Heer | Oberleutnant | Chief of the 2./Sturmgeschütz-Abteilung 1346 | 24 June 1944 | — | — |
| Hanns Ludwig | Luftwaffe | Feldwebel | Pilot in the 10.(Panzer)/Schlachtgeschwader 2 "Immelmann" | 8 August 1944 | — | — |
| Jürgen Ludwig | Heer | Oberleutnant | Chief of the 2./Pionier-Bataillon 74 (Note: According to Scherzer as chief of the 1./Pionier-Bataillon 173.) | 20 February 1943 | — | — |
| Hartwig von Ludwiger+ | Heer | Oberstleutnant | Commander of Infanterie-Regiment 83 | 15 July 1941 | Awarded 163rd Oak Leaves 23 December 1942 | — |
| Vollrath Lübbe | Heer | Generalleutnant | Commander of the 2. Panzer-Division | 17 August 1943 | — | — |
| Robert Lübke | Heer | Oberfeldwebel | Zugführer (platoon leader) in the 1./Panzergrenader-Regiment 25 | 7 January 1944 | — | — |
| Max-Hermann Lücke | Luftwaffe | Oberleutnant | Pilot in the 9./Jagdgeschwader 51 "Mölders" | 6 April 1944* | Died of wounds 8 November 1943 | — |
| Theodor von Lücken+ | Heer | Oberleutnant | Leader of the II./Infanterie-Regiment 502 | 2 March 1942 | Awarded 469th Oak Leaves 7 May 1944 | — |
| Hugo Lüdcke | Heer | Leutnant of the Reserves | Leader of the 8./Jäger-Regiment 28 | 9 February 1943 | — | — |
| Fritz Lüddecke | Luftwaffe | Oberfeldwebel | Pilot in the Stabsstaffel/Jagdgeschwader 51 "Mölders" | 18 November 1944* | Killed in action 10 August 1944 | — |
| Siegfried Lüdden | Kriegsmarine | Kapitänleutnant | Commander of U-188 | 11 February 1944 | — | — |
| Otto-Joachim Lüdecke | Heer | Generalmajor | Commander of the 56. Infanterie-Division | 8 August 1943 | — | — |
| Friedrich Lüders | Heer | Hauptmann | Chief of the 2./schwere Panzer-Jäger-Abteilung 654 | 30 September 1944 | — | — |
| Ernst Lüdke | Heer | Oberleutnant of the Reserves (Note: According to Scherzer as Oberleutnant (war officer).) | Leader of the 2./gemischte Flak-Abteilung 241 | 5 September 1944 | — | — |
| Erwin Luedtke | Heer | Fahnenjunker-Oberfeldwebel | Zugführer (platoon leader) in the 1./Grenadier-Regiment 502 | 15 May 1944 | — | — |
| Richard Lühne | Heer | Unteroffizier | Vorgeschobener Beobachter (forward observer) in Artillerie-Regiment 389 | 28 October 1944 | — | — |
| Arthur Lühr | Heer | Oberwachtmeister | Battery officer in the 6./Artillerie-Regiment 225 | 10 February 1945 | — | — |
| Wolfgang Luehrs | Luftwaffe | Oberleutnant | Staffelkapitän of the 2./Kampfgeschwader 53 "Legion Condor" (Note: According to Scherzer as Staffelkapitän in the I./Kampfgeschwader 53 "Legion Condor".) | 24 October 1944 | — | — |
| Willi Lüke | Heer | Unteroffizier | Group leader in the 3./Pionier-Bataillon 196 | 16 November 1944 | — | — |
| Harald Lülfing | Heer | Hauptmann of the Reserves | Commander of Füsilier-Bataillon 7 (Note: According to Scherzer as commander of Füsilier-Bataillon (A.A.) 7.) | 28 October 1944 | — | — |
| Paul Lüneburg | Heer | Oberst of the Reserves | Commander of Artillerie-Regiment 126 | 5 September 1944 | — | — |
| Siegfried Lüngen | Waffen-SS | SS-Hauptscharführer | Deputy leader of the 6./SS-Freiwilligen-Panzergrenader-Regiment 23 "Norge" (Note: According to Scherzer as leader of the 6./SS-Panzergrenader-Regiment 23 "Norge" (norwegian Nr. 1).) | 16 November 1944 | — | — |
| Wolfgang Lüth+ | Kriegsmarine | Oberleutnant zur See | Commander of U-138 | 24 October 1940 | Awarded 142nd Oak Leaves 13 November 1942; 29th Swords 15 April 1943; 7th Diamonds 9 August 1943 | |
| Heinz-Jürgen Lütje | Heer | Leutnant of the Reserves | Leader of the 2./Infanterie-Regiment 76 (motorized) | 18 October 1941 | — | — |
| Herbert Lütje+ | Luftwaffe | Hauptmann | Staffelkapitän of the 8./Nachtjagdgeschwader 1 | 1 June 1943 | Awarded 836th Oak Leaves 17 April 1945 | |
| Günther Lütjens | Kriegsmarine | Vizeadmiral | Befehlshaber der Aufklärenden Streitkräfte (Commander-in-Chief of the reconnaissance forces) | 14 June 1940 | — | |
| Hannibal von Lüttichau | Heer | Hauptmann | Commander of the II./Panzer-Regiment 2 | 16 January 1945 | — | — |
| Heinrich Freiherr von Lüttwitz+ | Heer | Oberst | Commander of Schützen-Regiment 59 | 27 May 1942 | Awarded 571st Oak Leaves 3 September 1944 (157th) Swords 9 May 1945? (Note: Heinrich von Lüttwitz's nomination was received by the Heerespersonalamt (HPA—Army Staff Office) on 28 April 1945. Major Joachim Domaschk decided on 30 April: "Heeresgruppe B, postpone!" General Von Lüttwiz, together with the remaining forces of the Heeresgruppe B, was declared missing in action in the Ruhr Pocket on 15 April. The nomination was thus not further processed in accordance with AHA 44 Ziff. 572. The nomination list for the higher grades of the Knight's Cross of the Iron Cross also contains a note from 28 April 1945: "postponed". Thus a bestowal did not occur. The sequential number "157" and presentation date were assigned by the Association of Knight's Cross Recipients (AKCR).) | — |
| Smilo Freiherr von Lüttwitz+ | Heer | Oberst | Commander of Schützen-Regiment 12 | 14 January 1942 | Awarded 426th Oak Leaves 16 March 1944; 76th Swords 4 July 1944 | |
| Günther Lützow+ | Luftwaffe | Major | Geschwaderkommodore of Jagdgeschwader 3 | 18 September 1940 | Awarded 27th Oak Leaves 20 July 1941; 4th Swords 11 October 1941 | |
| Kurt-Jürgen Freiherr von Lützow+ | Heer | Oberst | Commander of Infanterie-Regiment 89 | 15 August 1940 | Awarded 37th Oak Leaves 21 October 1941 | — |
| Joachim Lützow | Heer | Oberleutnant | Chief of Sturmgeschütz-Batterie 667 | 4 November 1941 | — | — |
| Hans Luhr | Luftwaffe | Oberfeldwebel | Pilot in the 7./Sturzkampfgeschwader 77 | 29 February 1944 | — | — |
| Walter Luitjens | Heer | Oberleutnant of the Reserves (Note: According to Scherzer as Oberleutnant.) | Leader of the 6./Grenadier-Regiment 151 | 3 September 1943 | — | — |
| Kurt Lukas | Heer | Oberfeldwebel | Zugführer (platoon leader) in the 5./Grenadier-Regiment 1124 (Note: According to Scherzer as Zugführer (platoon leader) in the IG-Kompanie/Grenadier-Regiment 1124.) | 17 March 1945* | Died of wounds 2 March 1945 | — |
| Diether Lukesch+ | Luftwaffe | Leutnant | Pilot in the 7./Kampfgeschwader 76 | 20 December 1941 | Awarded 620th Oak Leaves 10 October 1944 | |
| Hans Lummel | Heer | Obergefreiter | Company messenger in the 1./Grenadier-Regiment 333 | 16 October 1944 | — | — |
| Josef Lumpp | Heer | Feldwebel | Zugführer (platoon leader) in the 2./Grenadier-Regiment 358 (Note: According to Scherzer as leader of the 2./Grenadier-Regiment 358.) | 18 January 1945 | — | — |
| Karl-Willi Lumpp | Heer | Oberleutnant of the Reserves | Leader of the 3./Grenadier-Regiment 226 | 18 July 1943 | — | — |
| Hans Luthardt | Heer | Leutnant of the Reserves | Leader of Divisions Stoßtrupp-Kompanie 302 (Note: According to Scherzer as leader of Stoßtrupp-Kompanie 302 (302. Infanterie-Division).) | 31 July 1943 | — | — |
| Waldemar Lutsch | Luftwaffe | Oberleutnant | Staffelkapitän of the 1.(F)/Aufklärungs-Gruppe 121 (Note: According to Scherzer as Staffelführer of the Aufklärungsstaffel 1.(F)/122.) | 19 September 1943* | Killed in action 4 September 1943 | — |
| Johannes Lutter | Luftwaffe | Oberfeldwebel | Pilot in the II./Schnellkampfgeschwader 210 | 5 October 1941 | — | |
| Johannes (Hans) Lutz | Heer | Leutnant | Zugführer (platoon leader) in the Divisions-Begleit-Kompanie of the 116. Panzer-Division | 9 December 1944 | — | — |
| Martin Lutz | Luftwaffe | Hauptmann | Staffelkapitän of the 1./Zerstörergeschwader 1 (Note: According to Scherzer as Gruppenkommandeur of the Erprobungsgruppe 210 (awarded for his merits as Staffelkapitän of the 1./Zerstörergeschwader 1).) | 1 October 1940* | Killed in action 27 September 1940 | — |
| Waldemar Lutz | Heer | Hauptmann | Chief of the 1./Sturmgeschütz-Abteilung 245 | 2 October 1942* | Killed in action 15 September 1942 | — |
| Helmut Lutze | Heer | Oberfeldwebel | Zugführer (platoon leader) in the 1./Kradschützen-Bataillon 64 | 2 October 1942 | — | — |
| Werner Lutze | Heer | Hauptmann | Commander of the II./Infanterie-Regiment 169 | 24 July 1941 | — | |
| Walter Lux | Heer | Major | Leader of Grenadier-Regiment 316 | 10 July 1944 (Note: According to Scherzer on 11 July 1944.) | — | — |
| Josef Luxenburger | Luftwaffe | Oberleutnant | Oberserver in the 4./Kampfgeschwader 55 | 3 April 1943 | — | — |
| Helwig Luz | Heer | Oberst | Commander of Schützen-Regiment 110 | 15 November 1941 | — | — |
| Karl Luz | Heer | Hauptmann | Leader of the I./Grenadier-Regiment 850 | 23 August 1944 | — | — |
| Konrad Lyhme | Heer | Hauptmann | Leader of the III./Infanterie-Regiment 50 | 9 October 1942 | — | — |
