= Lengerke =

Lengerke is a surname. Notable people with the surname include:

- Geo von Lengerke (1827–1882), German engineer, merchant and landowner
- Wilhelm von Lengerke (1894–1942), Generalmajor in the Wehrmacht
- George von Lengerke Meyer (1858–1918), American businessman and politician
