= Vollrath von Hellermann =

- Born: 18 May 1900
- Died: 25 August 1971 (aged 71)
- Military career
- Allegiance: Nazi Germany
- Branch: Army (Wehrmacht)
- Service years: 1924–1945
- Rank: Generalmajor
- Commands: Panzergrenadier-Regiment 21
- Conflicts: World War II
- Awards: Knight's Cross of the Iron Cross

Vollrath von Hellermann (18 May 1900 – 25 August 1971) was a general n the Wehrmacht during World War II. He was also a recipient of the Knight's Cross of the Iron Cross.

== Awards and decorations ==
- German Cross in Gold on 20 September 1942 as Oberstleutnant in Kradschützen-Abteilung 4
- Knight's Cross of the Iron Cross on 21 November 1942 as Oberstleutnant and commander of Panzergrenadier-Regiment 21

Military offices
Preceded by Oberst Wilhelm von Lengerke	Commander of Panzergrenadier-Regiment 21; 1 September 1942 – 15 October 1942	Succeeded by Oberst von Below
