= Hans-Joachim Löser =

- Born: 4 April 1918
- Died: 13 February 2001 (aged 82)
- Military career
- Allegiance: Nazi Germany; West Germany
- Branch: Army
- Service years: 1936–45; 1956–74
- Rank: Major (Wehrmacht); Generalmajor (Bundeswehr)
- Commands: 1st Armoured Division (Bundeswehr)
- Conflicts: World War II
- Awards: Knight's Cross of the Iron Cross

Hans-Joachim Löser (4 April 1918 – 13 February 2001) was an officer the Wehrmacht during World War II. He was also a recipient of the Knight's Cross of the Iron Cross. Löser joined the Bundeswehr in 1956 and retired in 1974 as a Generalmajor.

== Awards and decorations ==
- Knight's Cross of the Iron Cross on 23 October 1941 as Hauptmann and commander of the III./Füsilier-Regiment 230

Military offices
Preceded by Generalmajor Horst Hildebrandt	Commander of 1. Panzerdivision; 15 December 1972 – 30 September 1974	Succeeded by Generalmajor Wilhelm Garken
