= Ernst Lucht =

German admiral

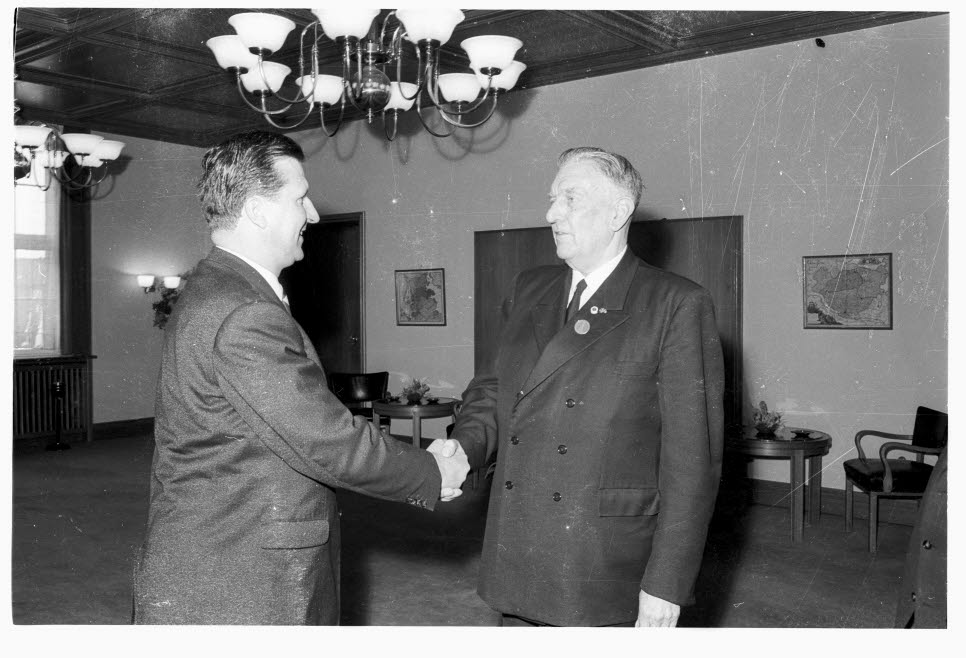
- Lucht (right) with Günther Bantzer, lord mayor of Kiel
- Born: 27 February 1896; Süderende on Föhr
- Died: 2 November 1975 (aged 79); Neumünster
- Military career
- Allegiance: German Empire (to 1918); Weimar Republic (to 1933); Nazi Germany
- Branch: Imperial German Navy; Reichsmarine; Kriegsmarine
- Service years: 1914–1945
- Rank: Konteradmiral
- Units: SMS Freya; SMS Schlesien
- Commands: Befehlshaber der Sicherung der Nordsee
- Conflicts: World War I World War II
- Awards: Knight's Cross of the Iron Cross

Ernst Lucht (27 February 1896 – 2 November 1975) was a German admiral during World War II. He was a recipient of the Knight's Cross of the Iron Cross of Nazi Germany.

== Awards ==
- Iron Cross (1914) 2nd Class (1915)
- Clasp to the Iron Cross (1939)
  - 2nd Class (17 December 1941)
- Iron Cross (1939)
  - 1st Class (5 September 1943)
- Silesian Eagle 2nd Class (10 October 1919)
- Honour Cross of the World War 1914/1918 (30 January 1935)
- Wehrmacht Long Service Award 4th to 1st Class (15 September 1939)
- War Merit Cross 2nd Class with Swords (30 January 1941) & 1st Class (20 April 1942)
- Minesweeper War Badge (6 December 1941)
- German Cross in Gold on 9 November 1944 as Konteradmiral and Befehlshaber der Sicherung der Nordsee (Commander-in-Chief of the security of the North Sea)
- Knight's Cross of the Iron Cross on 17 January 1945 as Konteradmiral and Befehlshaber der Sicherung der Nordsee
- Merit Cross 1st Class of the Federal Republic of Germany (April 1967)
