= Ludwig Lang =

German footballer (1946–2025)

- Lang in 1968

Personal information
- Date of birth: 9 February 1946
- Place of birth: Spiesen-Elversberg, Saar Protectorate, French-occupied Germany
- Date of death: 31 July 2025 (aged 79)
- Place of death: Spiesen-Elversberg, Saarland, Germany
- Position: Forward

Youth career
- ???–1966: SV Borussia Spiesen

Senior career*
Years	Team	Apps	(Gls)
1966–1977	Borussia Neunkirchen	214	(46)
Total		214	(46)
- * Club domestic league appearances and goals

Ludwig Lang (9 February 1946 – 31 July 2025) was a German footballer. Nicknamed "Lui", he played as a forward for Borussia Neunkirchen throughout his entire senior career, playing through the Regionalliga Südwest, the Bundesliga and the 2. Bundesliga.

== Career ==
Growing up in Spiesen-Elversberg and after playing for SV Borussia Spiesen in his youth alongside Joachim Weber, Lang arrived at the Ellenfeldstadion for the 1966–67 season at the age of 20 for the Regionalliga Südwest. The rookie found immediate success through winning the tournament that year as he scored nine goals in sixteen appearances. In the games in the Bundesliga promotion playoffs against Schwarz-Weiß Essen, Arminia Hannover, Bayern Hof and Hertha BSC, the Saarlanders prevailed under coach Željko Čajkovski and thus returned to the Bundesliga. Lang had played all eight games alongside teammates such as Horst Kirsch, Peter Czernotzky, Günter Kuntz, Erich Leist, Dieter Schock, Wolfgang Gayer, Erich Hermesdorf and Hans Linsenmaier and scored three goals himself. Following promotion, he played 14 games in the 1967–68 season season and scored four goals in the top-flight of German football, being one of the few footballers from Saarland to accomplish such an achievement.

Following direct relegation in their brief stint in the Bundesliga, Lang remained with Neunkirchen and played for Borussia in the Regionalliga Südwest for the next few seasons, including the inaugural 1974–75 season of the 2. Bundesliga. Lang achieved his best scoring rate in the 1970–71 season with 15 goals in 29 league games, the renewed championship title and second place in the Bundesliga promotion round behind promoted Fortuna Düsseldorf. In the home game against Düsseldorf on 27 June 1971, alongside players such as Gerd Zewe, Heinz Histing and Heinz-Jürgen Henkes, they managed a 2-2 draw. He had again played all eight group games and scored three goals. He celebrated two more south-west championships in the old second-tier Regionalliga in 1972 and 1974. In the inaugural 1974–75 2. Bundesliga, he finished 18th with Neunkirchen and was relegated to the amateur Saarlandliga with his club. Following two more seasons of amateur football, Lang retired from professional football at the end of the 1976–77 season.

== Personal life ==
Lang died on 31 July 2025 following his wife who died a year prior.
