= Fritz Lüddecke =

World War II Luftwaffe fighter ace (1920–1944)

- Lüddecke as Oberfeldwebel
- Born: Fritz Paul Lüddecke; 23 February 1920; Brakel
- Died: 10 August 1944 (aged 24); Wilkowischken, Lithuania
- Cause of death: Killed in action
- Military career
- Allegiance: Nazi Germany
- Branch: Luftwaffe
- Rank: Oberfeldwebel (staff sergeant)
- Unit: JG 51
- Conflicts: World War II; Eastern Front
- Awards: German Cross; Iron Cross; Knight's Cross of the Iron Cross

Fritz Paul Lüddecke (23 February 1920 – 10 August 1944) was a Luftwaffe fighter ace from Brakel, Germany. He was the recipient of the Knight's Cross of the Iron Cross during World War II. Fritz Lüddecke was credited with 50 kills all in the Eastern Front. In 1944 he was killed in action over Wilkowischken, Lithuania.

== Early life and career ==
Lüddecke was born on 23 February 1920 in Brakel, then in the Province of Westphalia within the Weimar Republic. He joined the military service of Luftwaffe and following flight training, (Note: Flight training in the Luftwaffe progressed through the levels A1, A2 and B1, B2, referred to as A/B flight training. A training included theoretical and practical training in aerobatics, navigation, long-distance flights and dead-stick landings. The B courses included high-altitude flights, instrument flights, night landings and training to handle the aircraft in difficult situations.) he was posted to Ergänzungs-Jagdgruppe Ost, a supplementary training unit for fighter pilots destined for the Eastern Front, on 18 November 1941. Lüddecke was then transferred to 6. Staffel (6th squadron) of Jagdgeschwader 51 (JG 51—51st Fighter Wing) on the Eastern Front on 20 May 1942. At the time, the Staffel was commanded by Oberleutnant Walter Stengel and subordinated to II. Gruppe (2nd group) which was headed by Hauptmann Hartmann Grasser.

== World War II ==
World War II in Europe had begun on Friday 1 September 1939 when German forces invaded Poland. On 17 July 1942, II. Gruppe had moved from Bryansk to an airfield named Orel-North. Here on 24 August, Lüddecke claimed his first aerial victory when he shot down a Mikoyan-Gurevich MiG-3 fighter, his only claim while flying with 6. Staffel.

=== With the Stabsstaffel ===
In early October 1942, II. Gruppe of JG 51 was withdrawn from the Eastern Front and sent to Jesau, near present-day Bagrationovsk, to Heiligenbeil, present-day Mamonovo, to be reequipped with the Focke-Wulf Fw 190 A. While undergoing training on this aircraft, the Gruppe received orders on 4 November to transfer to the Mediterranean theatre flying the Bf 109 again. 6. Staffel was exempt from this order, was detached from II. Gruppe, and continued its training on the Fw 190. In late November, 6. Staffel was renamed to Stabsstaffel (headquarters squadron) of JG 51 and placed under the command of Diethelm von Eichel-Streiber on 30 November. Alternatively, the Stabsstaffel was also referred to as Geschwaderstabsstaffel z.b.V., roughly translating to fighter wing squadron for special deployment. The abbreviation z. b. V. is German and stands for zur besonderen Verwendung (for special deployment).

The Stabsstaffel transferred to the Eastern Front again on 5 February 1943 where it was based at an airfield at Smolensk. There, the fought in support of the 9th Army during the Battles of Rzhev. On 9 March, the Stabsstaffel was scrambled multiple times in defense of the airfield. At noon, a Petlyakov Pe-2 bomber was shot down southwest of Dugino, located approximately 50 kilometers (31 miles) north of Vyazma, which was credited to Lüddecke. The Stabsstaffel was tasked with providing fighter protection of the Smolensk airfield on 15 March. In the morning, the Stabsstaffel was scrambled to intercept a flight of Ilyushin Il-2 ground-attack aircraft north of Smolensk and claimed four aerial victories including an Il-2 aircraft by Lüddecke.

On the first day of the Battle of Kursk, 5 July 1943, the Stabsstaffel relocated from Smolensk to Oryol where it fought over the northern face of the salient. On 13 July, the Stabsstaffel was deployed over the combat area near Novosil where they engaged in combat with Soviet fighters. During this engagement, the Staffel claimed five aerial victories, including a Lavochkin La-5 fighter by Lüddecke, for the loss of one of their own. By end August, Lüddecke had increased his number of aerial victories to 13 and had been awarded both classes of the Iron Cross (Eisernes Kreuz).

=== Operation Bagration and death ===
On 1 August 1944 during Operation Bagration, the Stabstaffel moved to Jürgenfelde, present-day Judino in Kaliningrad Oblast, flying its first combat missions the following day. Here, Lüddecke claimed ten aerial victories, including two on 9 August, taking his total to 50, his last claims.

On 10 August, Lüddecke was killed in action in his Focke-Wulf Fw 190 A-8 (Werknummer 172958—factory number) 16 kilometers (9.9 miles) south-southwest of Wilkowischken, present-day Vilkaviškis. Following hits by anti-aircraft artillery, he attempted an emergency landing when his aircraft exploded in mid-air. He was posthumously awarded the German Cross in Gold (Deutsches Kreuz in Gold) on 1 October 1944, and the Knight's Cross of the Iron Cross (Ritterkreuz des Eisernen Kreuzes) on 18 November 1944.

== Summary of career ==
=== Aerial victory claims ===
According to Jacobs and Obermaier, Lüddecke was credited with 50 aerial victories all of which claimed on the Eastern Front. He flew more than 600 combat missions, including 150 fighter-bomber missions. Matthews and Foreman, authors of Luftwaffe Aces — Biographies and Victory Claims, researched the German Federal Archives and found records for 51 aerial victory claims, all of which claimed on the Eastern Front.

Victory claims were logged to a map-reference (PQ = Planquadrat), for example "PQ 54284". The Luftwaffe grid map (Jägermeldenetz) covered all of Europe, western Russia and North Africa and was composed of rectangles measuring 15 minutes of latitude by 30 minutes of longitude, an area of about 360 square miles (930 km^{2}). These sectors were then subdivided into 36 smaller units to give a location area 3 km × 4 km (1.9 mi × 2.5 mi) in size.

Chronicle of aerial victories
This and the – (dash) indicates unconfirmed aerial victory claims for which Lüddecke did not receive credit. This and the ? (question mark) indicates information discrepancies listed by Prien, Stemmer, Rodeike, Bock, Matthews and Foreman.
| Claim | Date | Time | Type | Location | Claim | Date | Time | Type | Location |
– 6. Staffel of Jagdgeschwader 51 "Mölders" –
| 1 | 24 August 1942 | 13:40? (Note: According to Mathews and Foreman claimed at 13:45.) | MiG-3 | PQ 54284; 25 km (16 mi) south of Kozelsk | | | | | |
– Stabsstaffel of Jagdgeschwader 51 "Mölders" – Eastern Front — 1 January – 31 December 1943
| 2 | 9 March 1943 | 12:00 | Pe-2 | PQ 35 Ost 36643, 50 km (31 mi) west-northwest of Mjabau | 11 | 20 August 1943 | 13:35 | Il-2 m.H. (Note: The "m.H." refers to an Ilyushin Il-2 with rear gunner (mit Heckschütze).) | southwest of Spas-Demensk |
| 3 | 15 March 1943 | 10:19 | Il-2 | PQ 35 Ost 26554; 20 km (12 mi) north of Moschna | 12 | 20 August 1943 | 13:36? (Note: According to Mathews and Foreman claimed at 13:50.) | Il-2 m.H. | PQ 35 Ost 35837, Spas-Demensk |
| 4 | 13 July 1943 | 15:20 | La-5 | PQ 35 Ost 63263, 11 km (6.8 mi) southwest of Novosil; 25 km (16 mi) east-southeast of Zalegoshch | 13 | 29 August 1943 | 13:09 | Il-2 m.H. | PQ 35 Ost 42139, 45 km (28 mi) northeast of Glukhov; 25 km (16 mi) south of Sevsk |
| 5 | 16 July 1943 | 09:45 | La-5 | PQ 35 Ost 54319; 20 km (12 mi) east of Zhizdra | 14 | 7 September 1943 | 08:36 | Yak-9 | northeast of Dukhovshchina |
| 6 | 12 August 1943 | 08:43? (Note: According to Mathews and Foreman claimed at 08:49.) | LaGG-3 | PQ 35 Ost 35453, 30 km (19 mi) northwest of Yelnya; 30 km (19 mi) northwest of Spas-Demensk | 15 | 12 November 1943 | 09:11 | La-5 | PQ 35 Ost 06817, 21 km (13 mi) east of Vitebsk |
| 7 | 16 August 1943 | 13:50? (Note: According to Mathews and Foreman claimed at 13:40.) | LaGG-3 | PQ 35 Ost 35696; 15 km (9.3 mi) southwest of Utrikowo | 16 | 5 December 1943 | 11:00 | Il-2 m.H. | PQ 25 Ost 93247; 15 km (9.3 mi) northeast of Parichi |
| 8 | 18 August 1943 | 18:43 | Il-2 m.H. | PQ 35 Ost 35664, Spas-Demensk; 10 km (6.2 mi) west of Spas-Demensk | 17 | 12 December 1943 | 12:08 | Yak-9 | PQ 25 Ost 93286; 20 km (12 mi) east of Parichi |
| 9 | 20 August 1943 | 13:28 | Il-2 m.H. | PQ 35 Ost 358, southwest of Spas-Demensk | 18 | 23 December 1943 | 13:08 | Il-2 m.H. | PQ 25 Ost 93411; 15 km (9.3 mi) southeast of Parichi |
| 10 | 20 August 1943 | 13:32? (Note: According to Mathews and Foreman claimed at 13:30.) | Il-2 m.H. | southwest of Spas-Demensk; 20 km (12 mi) southwest of Utrikowo | | | | | |
– Stabsstaffel of Jagdgeschwader 51 "Mölders" – Eastern Front — 1 January – 10 August 1944
| 19 | 10 January 1944 | 13:23 | Pe-2 | PQ 25 Ost 93648; 40 km (25 mi) north-northeast of Mazyr | 34 | 2 July 1944 | 08:41 | Yak-9 | PQ 25 Ost 85774 vicinity of Lowica |
| 20 | 5 February 1944 | 07:20 | La-5 | PQ 25 Ost 93152; 15 km (9.3 mi) northwest of Parichi | 35 | 11 July 1944 | 11:45 | P-39 | PQ 25 Ost 54713; 15 km (9.3 mi) northeast of Karachev |
| 21 | 22 February 1944 | 13:00 | Yak-7 | PQ 25 Ost 94895; 10 km (6.2 mi) west-southwest of Rahachow | 36 | 18 July 1944 | 16:21 | P-39 | PQ 25 Ost 42581; 15 km (9.3 mi) northwest of Liuboml |
| 22 | 22 February 1944 | 13:01 | Il-2 | PQ 25 Ost 94894; 10 km (6.2 mi) west-southwest of Rahachow | 37 | 19 July 1944 | 17:29 | Yak-9 | PQ 25 Ost 32762 vicinity of Chełm |
| 23 | 18 June 1944 | 14:28? (Note: According to Mathews and Foreman claimed at 14:18.) | La-5 | PQ 35 Ost 04866 | 38 | 20 July 1944 | 07:30 | Il-2 | PQ 25 Ost 32866; 25 km (16 mi) east of Chełm |
| 24 | 22 June 1944 | 18:20? (Note: According to Mathews and Foreman claimed at 18:21.) | LaGG-3 | PQ 25 Ost 96536; 20 km (12 mi) north-northeast of Ulla | 39 | 20 July 1944 | 11:35 | Il-2 | PQ 25 Ost 32399; 30 km (19 mi) east-southeast of Chełm |
| — (Note: This unconfirmed claim is not listed by Mathews and Foreman.) | 23 June 1944 | 09:40 | LaGG-3 | PQ 25 Ost 968, north-northeast of Orsha | 40 | 20 July 1944 | 11:36 | Il-2 | PQ 25 Ost 31233; 25 km (16 mi) north of Hostynne |
| 25 | 23 June 1944 | 13:19 | Yak-9 | PQ 25 Ost 96689 vicinity of Ulla | 41 | 2 August 1944 | 11:11 | La-5 | PQ 25 Ost 35374, 12 km (7.5 mi) south of Vilkaviškis; 20 km (12 mi) west of Marijampolė |
| 26 | 23 June 1944 | 14:15? (Note: According to Mathews and Foreman claimed at 14:24.) | Il-2 | PQ 25 Ost 96726 vicinity of Ulla | 42 | 2 August 1944 | 11:29 | Yak-9 | PQ 25 Ost 25469, 8 km (5.0 mi) south-southwest of Vilkaviškis; 25 km (16 mi) west-northwest of Marijampolė |
| 27 | 23 June 1944 | 14:29? (Note: According to Mathews and Foreman claimed at 14:25.) | Il-2 | PQ 25 Ost 96562; 10 km (6.2 mi) north of Ulla | 43 | 4 August 1944 | 08:04 | Il-2 | PQ 25 Ost 35371, 7 km (4.3 mi) south of Vilkaviškis; 20 km (12 mi) west of Marijampolė |
| ? (Note: This claim is not listed by Prien, Stemmer, Balke and Bock. However Mathews and Foreman list this claim as his 28th aerial victory.) | 24 June 1944 | 12:15 | La-5 | 30 km (19 mi) north-northeast of Orsha | 44 | 4 August 1944 | 08:30 | La-5 | PQ 25 Ost 25498, 18 km (11 mi) south-southwest of Vilkaviškis; 25 km (16 mi) east of Trakehnen |
| 28 | 24 June 1944 | 16:26 | Yak-9 | PQ 35 Ost 05329; 25 km (16 mi) northwest of Orsha | 45 | 5 August 1944 | 12:16? (Note: According to Mathews and Foreman claimed at 16:16.) | La-5 | PQ 25 Ost 35344; 20 km (12 mi) west-northwest of Marijampolė |
| 29 | 25 June 1944 | 12:05 | Il-2 | PQ 35 Ost 05351; 20 km (12 mi) northwest of Orsha | 46 | 7 August 1944 | 07:42 | Yak-9 | PQ 25 Ost 25431, 15 km (9.3 mi) northeast of Eydtkau; 25 km (16 mi) east-southeast of Blumenfeld |
| 30 | 26 June 1944 | 14:53? (Note: According to Mathews and Foreman claimed at 14:58.) | Yak-9 | PQ 25 Ost 95647; 10 km (6.2 mi) southwest of Talachyn | 47 | 7 August 1944 | 07:46 | Yak-9 | PQ 25 Ost 25433, 18 km (11 mi) northeast of Eydtkau; 25 km (16 mi) east-southeast of Blumenfeld |
| 31 | 26 June 1944 | 14:59 | Yak-9 | PQ 25 Ost 95535; 20 km (12 mi) west-northwest of Talachyn | 48 | 8 August 1944 | 17:42 | La-5 | PQ 25 Ost 35312; 20 km (12 mi) northwest of Marijampolė |
| 32 | 28 June 1944 | 16:47 | La-5 | PQ 25 Ost 95586; 30 km (19 mi) southwest of Talachyn | 49 | 9 August 1944 | 16:10 | Yak-9 | PQ 25 Ost 35348; 20 km (12 mi) west-northwest of Marijampolė |
| 33 | 29 June 1944 | 17:13 | P-39 | PQ 25 Ost 94157; 15 km (9.3 mi) northeast of Byerazino | 50 | 9 August 1944 | 19:19 | La-5 | PQ 25 Ost 35329; 20 km (12 mi) north-northwest of Marijampolė |

=== Awards ===
- Iron Cross (1939) 2nd and 1st Class
- Honor Goblet of the Luftwaffe on 13 December 1943 as Feldwebel and pilot
- German Cross in Gold on 1 October 1944 as Feldwebel in the Stabsstaffel/Jagdgeschwader 51
- Knight's Cross of the Iron Cross on 18 November 1944 as Oberfeldwebel and pilot in the Stabsstaffel/Jagdgeschwader 51 "Mölders"
