= Max Lindig =

- Born: 11 July 1887; Berlin, Province of Brandenburg, Kingdom of Prussia, German Empire
- Died: 26 April 1961 (aged 73); Itzehoe, Schleswig-Holstein, West Germany
- Relatives: ∞ 1919 Adelheid Hedwig Maria von Raesfeld; 3 children
- Military career
- Allegiance: German Empire; Weimar Republic; Nazi Germany
- Branch: Prussian Army; Imperial German Army; Freikorps (Grenzschutz Ost); Reichswehr; German Army (Wehrmacht)
- Service years: 1909–1945
- Rank: Generalleutnant
- Commands: 9th Artillery-Regiment; Arko 122; Harko 307
- Conflicts: World War I World War II: Battle of France; Operation Barbarossa; Battle of Smolensk (1941); Battle of Moscow; Battles of Rzhev; Battle of Kursk; Operation Bagration; Bobruysk Offensive; Operation Veritable
- Awards: Knight's Cross of the Iron Cross

Max Ludwig Eduard Ferdinand Lindig (11 July 1887 – 26 April 1961) was a German officer, finally Generalleutnant of the Wehrmacht of Nazi Germany during World War II. He was a recipient of the Knight's Cross of the Iron Cross.

== Life ==
Max Lindig was the son of the privy senior government and building councilor (Geheimer Oberregierungs- und Baurat) Dr. jur. Max Lindig, Speaker Council in the Prussian Ministry of the Interior, and his wife Else, née Wehle (d. 4 April 1932). On October 1, 1909, he joined the Grand Ducal Hessian Field Artillery Regiment No. 25 (Großherzogliches Artilleriekorps, 1. Großherzoglich Hessisches Feldartillerie-Regiment Nr. 25) as a one-year volunteer. On 21 March 1910, he was transferred to the Feld-Artillerie-Regiment "General-Feldzeugmeister" (2. Brandenburgisches) Nr. 18 as an officer candidate. On August 2, 1914, he went to the front with his regiment. The regiment was deployed on the Western Front. Promoted to first lieutenant on April 18, 1915, he became a battery commander in Field Artillery Regiment No. 90 on July 15, 1915. on 21 August 1916, he was wounded. From September 20, 1916, he served as adjutant in Mobile Field Artillery Replacement Battalion 4. From February 18, 1917, he served on the staff of Arko 134. On June 30, 1918, he was transferred as a battery commander to Field Artillery Regiment "von Scharnhorst" (1st Hanoverian) No. 10, with which he fought in the Ypres area and in September 1918 in front of the Siegfried Front. On 2 October 1918, he was wounded again. On November 12, 1918, he was transferred to the staff of the High Command Homeland Protection East which would soon become the Grenzschutz Ost. There he was appointed 2nd adjutant. On February 27, 1919, he was transferred back to the 18th Field Artillery Regiment (2nd Brandenburg) in his home region for demobilization. On April 1, 1919, he joined the training battery of the 5th Division and on September 29, 1919, became adjutant to the 27th Artillery Commander with Grenzschutz Ost.

Max Lindig was accepted into the Reichswehr and on January 20, 1920, transferred to the staff of the 5th Reichswehr Brigade. From October 1, 1920, he served as adjutant at the Küstrin Command. On October 1, 1924, he was transferred to the 2nd Artillery Regiment, where he commanded the 2nd Battery from January 12, 1925. On July 1, 1938, he was transferred to the staff of the III. He was assigned to the 1st Battalion and transferred to its staff on May 1, 1929. Promoted to Major in April 1931, he was transferred to the staff of the Artillery Commander II on May 1, 1932. On December 1, 1933, he was transferred to the staff of the 2nd Division of the Reichswehr in Stettin. On October 1, 1934, he became commander of the 4th Battalion of the Rendsburg Artillery Regiment (IV./Artillery Regiment 20). On October 1, 1935, he became commander of the 1st Battalion of Artillery Regiment 56. On October 6, 1936, he was transferred to the Reich War Ministry. From March 1, 1938, he was head of a department in the acceptance department of the OKW (High Command of the Armed Forces). On June 1, 1939, he assumed command of Artillery Regiment 9, with which he participated in the Polish Campaign. From April 1, 1940, he was registered as Arko 122 (Army Commander 122). From March 25, 1942, he was HArko 307 (Army Commander 307). On April 11, 1942, he was awarded the German Cross in Gold. On July 27, 1944, he was awarded the Knight's Cross. In July 1944, he was appointed combat commander of Osipovichi in Belarus. After the fall of the city, he was transferred to the Führerreserve (Officer Reserve) on August 11, 1944, and on December 28, 1944, he became Higher Artillery Commander or Harko, serving with the 1st Parachute Army. In February 1945, he was severely wounded and subsequently transferred to the Führerreserve.

== Promotions ==
- One-year volunteer (Einjährig-Freiwilliger)
- 21 March 1910 Fahnenjunker (Officer Candidate)
- 17 May 1910 Fähnrich (Officer Cadet)
- 20 March 1911 Leutnant (2nd Lieutenant) wit Patent from 25 March 1909
- 18 April 1915 Oberleutnant (1st Lieutenant)
- 18 April 1918 Hauptmann (Captain)
- 1 April 1931 Major
- 1 August 1934 Oberstleutnant (Lieutenant Colonel)
- 18 January 1937 Oberst (Colonel) with effect from 1 January 1937
- 20 November 1940 Generalmajor (Major General) with effect from 1 December 1940
- 16 November 1942 Generalleutnant (Lieutenant General) with effect from 1 December 1942

== Awards and decorations ==
- Iron Cross (1914), 2nd and 1st Class
  - EK II on 16 October 1914
  - EK I on 14 September 1916
- Hanseatic Cross of Hamburg (HH) on 14 February 1917
- Wound Badge (1918) in Black on 24 May 1918
- Saxon Albert Order, Knight 2nd Class with Swords (SA3bX/AR2X) on 22 July 1918
- Honour Cross of the World War 1914/1918 with Swords on 17 January 1935
- Wehrmacht Long Service Award, 4th to 1st Class (25-year Service Cross) on 2 October 1936
- Austrian War Commemorative Medal with Swords
  - some sources state he had also the Hungarian World War Commemorative Medal with Swords and the Bulgarian War Commemorative Medal 1915–1918 with Swords, but this cannot be confirmed.
- Anschluss Medal on 8 November 1938
- Sudetenland Medal on 12 September 1939
- Repetition Clasp 1939 to the Iron Cross 1914, 2nd and 1st Class
  - Clasp to EK II on 14 November 1939
  - Clasp to EK I on 19 June 1940
- Imperial Order of the Yoke and Arrows, Commander (Encomienda Sencilla) on 20 March 1941
- Winter Battle in the East 1941–42 Medal on 12 July 1942
- Wound Badge (1939) in Silver in February 1945
- German Cross in Gold on 11 April 1942 as Generalmajor and Artillerie-Kommandeur 122 (Arko 122)
- Knight's Cross of the Iron Cross on 27 July 1944 as Generalleutnant and Höherer Artillerie-Kommandeur 307 (Harko 307)

Military offices
Preceded by Generalmajor John Ansat	Commander of Harko 307; 25 March 1942 – 11 August 1944	Succeeded by Generalleutnant Karl Thoholte
