= Wilhelm von Lengerke =

- Born: 17 June 1894
- Died: 26 August 1942 (aged 48); Stalingrad, Soviet Union
- Military career
- Allegiance: German Empire; Weimar Republic; Nazi Germany
- Branch: Army
- Service years: 1913–1922; 1934–1942
- Rank: Generalmajor (Posthumously)
- Conflicts: Battle of Stalingrad †
- Awards: Knight's Cross of the Iron Cross

Wilhelm von Lengerke (17 June 1894 – 26 August 1942) was a general in the Wehrmacht of Nazi Germany during World War II. He was a recipient of the Knight's Cross of the Iron Cross. Lengerke was killed 26 August 1942 during the Battle of Stalingrad. He was posthumously promoted to Generalmajor. He is now buried in Lüneburg, Germany.

== Awards and decorations ==
- Knight's Cross of the Iron Cross on 31 August 1941 as Oberstleutnant and commander of 1./Reiter-Regiment 1

== Notes ==
Military offices
| Preceded by Previously Reiter-Regiment 1 | Commander of Panzergrenadier-Regiment 21; 3 December 1941 – 26 August 1942 | Succeeded by Oberstleutnant Vollrath von Hellermann |
