= Northrop N-1 =

American flying wing bomber project

N-1
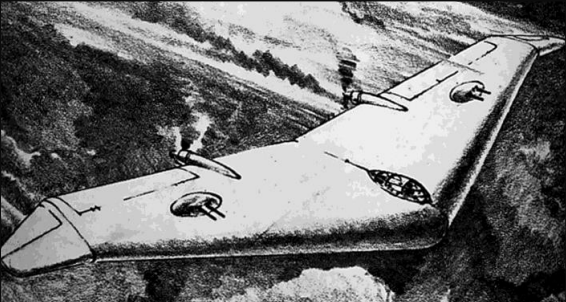

General information
- Type: Flying wing medium bomber
- National origin: United States
- Manufacturer: Northrop Corporation
- Designer: Jack Northrop
- Status: Canceled
- Number built: 0

History
- Variant: Northrop N-1M

The Northrop N-1 (Northrop Model 1) was a projected flying wing medium bomber designed by Jack Northrop.

== Design and development ==
The N-1 was a development of an earlier flying wing bomber concept from 1937, when Jack Northrop worked for Douglas Aircraft Company at El Segundo, California. This concept featured a fuselage that protruded forward of the leading edge of the wing, two pusher propellers, and vertical stabilizers on the tips of the wings. Its engines were never specified, but its defensive armament was to consist of a nose and tail turrets. A wind tunnel model of the concept was built and tested, but the project was abandoned shortly after Northrop left Douglas.

Northrop continued work on the bomber after he formed his own company, Northrop Corporation, in 1939. In response to the United States Army Air Corps' XC-219 specification, which called for a new high-altitude medium bomber, Northrop made several major changes to the design, and gave it the model number N-1. The wing was now thicker, and the separate fuselage structure was dispensed in favor of incorporating the crew compartments into the airfoil. The vertical stabilizers were replaced with drooped wingtips with an anhedral of 35 degrees, which were apparently found to stabilize paper planes during tests conducted by Jack Northrop, his son John, and Moye Stephens on a stormy weekend. Details of the design varied greatly as the aircraft evolved, with an early version featuring a large greenhouse canopy and a single vertical stabilizer under the fuselage to act as a propeller guard. There were originally planned to be seven crew, later reduced to four, including two gunners manning forward-firing guns in the nose.

Later, the stabilizer was deleted, with the anhedral of the wingtips increased to 40 degrees to make up for it, and a retractable tail wheel was added as a propeller guard instead. The greenhouse canopy was replaced with a bubble canopy protruding from the top of the wing. Defensive armament was to consist of four remotely operated turrets; one on the top and one on the underside of each wing.

The proposed powerplant of the N-1 was originally a pair of Pratt & Whitney X-1800 liquid-cooled H24 engines. When development of the X-1800 ended in October 1940, Northrop proposed that the N-1 be powered by either the Pratt & Whitney R-2800 Double Wasp or the Lycoming XH-2470.

Although Northrop never received a contract to build the a full-scale N-1, the company did build a flying mockup as the N-1M. The N-1M was used mainly for research, but also served as the forerunner of the larger Northrop YB-35 and YB-49 bombers.

== See also ==
Related development

- Northrop N-1M
- Northrop N-9M
- Northrop YB-35
- Northrop YB-49

Aircraft of comparable role, configuration, and era

- Horten H.XVIII
- Northrop Grumman B-2 Spirit
