= Northrop Corporation =

American aerospace company (1939–1994)

- Industry: Aerospace
- Founded: 1939; 87 years ago
- Founders: Jack Northrop
- Defunct: 1994
- Fate: Merged with Grumman
- Successor: Northrop Grumman
- Headquarters: Hawthorne, California, United States of America
- Key people: Oliver P. Echols; Thomas V. Jones
- Products: Aircraft
- Subsidiaries: Radioplane Company

Northrop Corporation was an American aircraft manufacturer from its formation in 1939 until its 1994 merger with Grumman to form Northrop Grumman. The company is known for its development of the flying wing design, most successfully the B-2 Spirit stealth bomber.

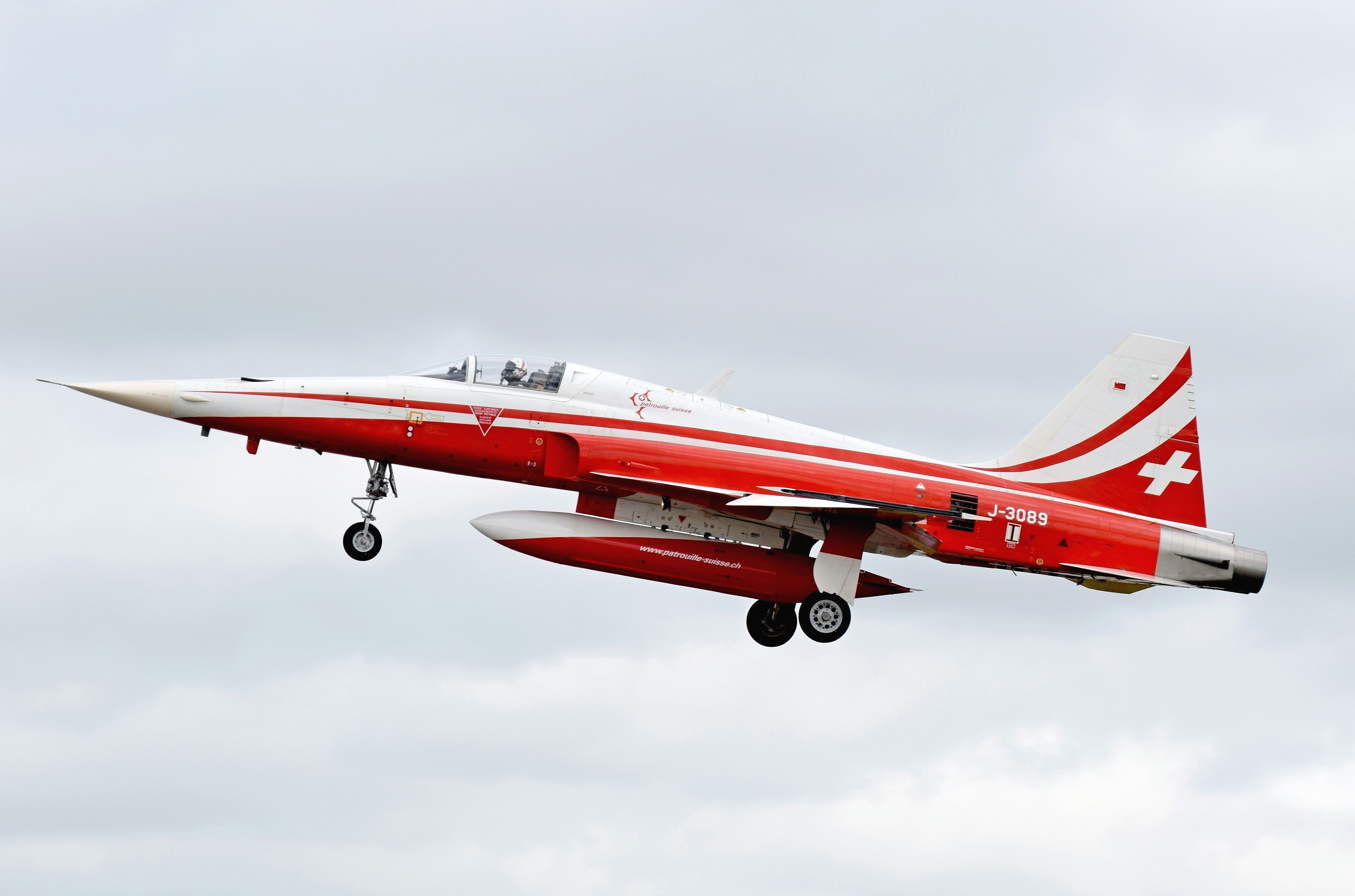
Northrop Corporation F-5E Tiger II of the Swiss Air Force arrives at the 2016 RIAT, England

== History ==
Jack Northrop founded three companies using his name. The first was the Avion Corporation in 1928, which was absorbed in 1929 by the United Aircraft and Transport Corporation as a subsidiary named "Northrop Aircraft Corporation" (and later became part of Boeing). The parent company moved its operations to Kansas in 1931, and so Northrop, along with Donald Douglas, established a "Northrop Corporation" located in El Segundo, California, which produced several successful designs, including the Northrop Gamma and Northrop Delta. However, labor difficulties led to the dissolution of the corporation by Douglas in 1937, and the plant became the El Segundo Division of Douglas Aircraft.

Northrop still sought his own company, and so in 1939 he established the "Northrop Corporation" in nearby Hawthorne, California, a site located by co-founder Moye Stephens. The corporation ranked 100th among United States corporations in the value of World War II military production contracts. It was there that the P-61 Black Widow night fighter, the B-35 and YB-49 experimental flying wing bombers, the F-89 Scorpion interceptor, the SM-62 Snark intercontinental cruise missile, and the F-5 Freedom Fighter economical jet fighter (and its derivative, the successful T-38 Talon trainer) were developed and built.

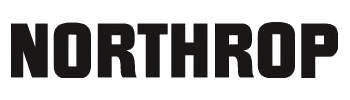
Northrop Corporation wordmark from 1960

The F-5 was so successful that Northrop spent much of the 1970s and 1980s attempting to duplicate its success with similar lightweight designs. Their first attempt to improve the F-5 was the N-300, which featured much more powerful engines and moved the wing to a higher position to allow for increased ordnance that the higher power allowed. The N-300 was further developed into the P-530 with even larger engines, this time featuring a small amount of "bypass" (turbofan) to improve cooling and allow the engine bay to be lighter, as well as much more wing surface. The P-530 also included radar and other systems considered necessary on modern aircraft. When the Light Weight Fighter program was announced, the P-530 was stripped of much of its equipment to become the P-600, and eventually the YF-17 Cobra, which lost the competition to the General Dynamics F-16 Fighting Falcon.

Nevertheless, the YF-17 Cobra was modified with help from McDonnell Douglas to become the McDonnell Douglas F/A-18 Hornet in order to fill a similar lightweight design competition for the US Navy. Northrop intended to sell a de-navalized version as the F-18L, but the basic F-18A continued to outsell it, leading to a long and fruitless lawsuit between the two companies. Northrop continued to build much of the F-18 fuselage and other systems after this period, but also returned to the original F-5 design with yet another new engine to produce the F-20 Tigershark as a low-cost aircraft. This garnered little interest in the market, and the project was dropped.

In 1985, Northrop bought northrop.com, the sixth .com domain created.

Based on the experimentation with flying wings the company developed the B-2 Spirit stealth bomber of the 1990s.

In 1994, partly due to the loss of the Advanced Tactical Fighter contract to Lockheed Corporation and the removal of their proposal from consideration for the Joint Strike Fighter competition, the company bought Grumman to form Northrop Grumman.

== Aircraft ==
Model name	First flight	Number built	Type
Northrop Alpha	1930	17	Single-engine transport
Northrop C-19 Alpha	1930	3	Single-engine transport
Northrop Beta	1931	2	Single-engine sport airplane
Northrop Gamma	1932	60	Single-engine transport
Northrop Delta	1933	13	Single-engine transport, 19 additional aircraft built by Canadian Vickers
Northrop XFT	1933	1	Prototype naval fighter
Northrop YA-13	1933	1	Prototype attack aircraft
Northrop A-17/Nomad	1935	411	Attack/light bomber
Northrop BT	1935	55	Dive bomber
Northrop N-1M	1940	1	Experimental flying wing
Northrop N-3PB	1940	24	Floatplane patrol bomber
Northrop P-61 Black Widow	1942	706	Night fighter
Northrop N-9M	1942	4	Experimental scale flying wing proof of concept for B-35
Northrop XP-56 Black Bullet	1943	2	Prototype tailless fighter
Northrop F-15 Reporter	1945	36	Reconnaissance aircraft based on P-61
Northrop XP-79	1945	1	Prototype jet flying wing fighter
Northrop YB-35	1946	2	Prototype strategic bomber
Northrop Pioneer	1946	1	Trimotor transport
Northrop YB-49	1947	3	Prototype eight-jet-engine strategic bomber
Northrop F-89 Scorpion	1948	1,052	Interceptor
Northrop X-4 Bantam	1948	2	Experimental trans-sonic tailless aircraft
Northrop YC-125 Raider	1949	23	Trimotor transport
Northrop F-5	1959	2,246	Lightweight fighter
Northrop T-38 Talon	1959	1,146	Advanced trainer
Northrop X-21	1963	2	Experimental boundary layer control aircraft
Northrop M2-F2	1966	1	Experimental rocket powered lifting body
Northrop HL-10	1966	1	Experimental rocket lifting body
Northrop M2-F3	1970	1	Experimental rocket lifting body
Northrop YA-9	1972	2	Prototype attack aircraft
Northrop YF-17	1974	2	Prototype fighter, led to F/A-18
Northrop Tacit Blue	1982	1	Experimental stealth aircraft
Northrop F-20 Tigershark	1982	3	Prototype lightweight fighter derived from F-5
Northrop B-2 Spirit	1989	21	Strategic stealth bomber
Northrop YF-23	1990	2	Prototype stealth fighter

=== Projects ===
- Northrop N-1 (USAAC flying wing bomber)
- Northrop N-4 (USAAF pursuit)
- Northrop N-5 (USAAF pursuit)
- Northrop N-6 (Navy fighter design)
- Northrop N-15 (2-engine cargo plane)
- Northrop N-31 (flying wing bomber project)
- Northrop N-34 (nuclear-powered flying wing bomber design)
- Northrop N-55 (patrol aircraft)
- Northrop N-59 (carrier-based bomber)
- Northrop N-60 (ASW aircraft; lost to Grumman S-2 Tracker)
- Northrop N-63 (rival tailsitting VTOL design to Lockheed XFV-1 and Convair XFY-1)
- Northrop N-65 (interceptor for WS-201 program)
- Northrop N-74 (tactical transport)
- Northrop N-94 (Navy fighter competitor design to Vought F8U Crusader)
- Northrop N-102 Fang
- Northrop N-103 (all-weather interceptor)
- Northrop N-132 (strategic fighter)
- Northrop N-144 (long-range interceptor)
- Northrop N-155 (target-towing aircraft)
- Northrop N-285 (USN advanced jet trainer; lost to T-45 Goshawk)
- Northrop N-321/P610 (Light-Weight Fighter)

=== Unmanned aerial vehicles ===
- Northrop AQM-35
- Northrop AQM-38
- Northrop BQM-74 Chukar

=== Missiles ===
- GAM-67 Crossbow
- Northrop JB-1 Bat
- SM-62 Snark

== Leadership ==
=== President ===
- John Knudsen Northrop, 1940–1953
- Oliver Patton Echols, 1953–1955
- Whitley C. Collins, 1955–1959
- Thomas Victor Jones, 1959–1976
- Thomas Otten Paine, 1976–1982
- Frank W. Lynch, 1982–

=== Chairman of the Board ===
- LaMotte T. Cohu, 1940–1948
- Richard William Millar, 1948–1950
- Oliver Patton Echols, 1950–1955
- William C. McDuffie, 1955–1963
- Thomas Victor Jones, 1963–
