= Northrop N-1M =

American experimental flying wing

N-1M
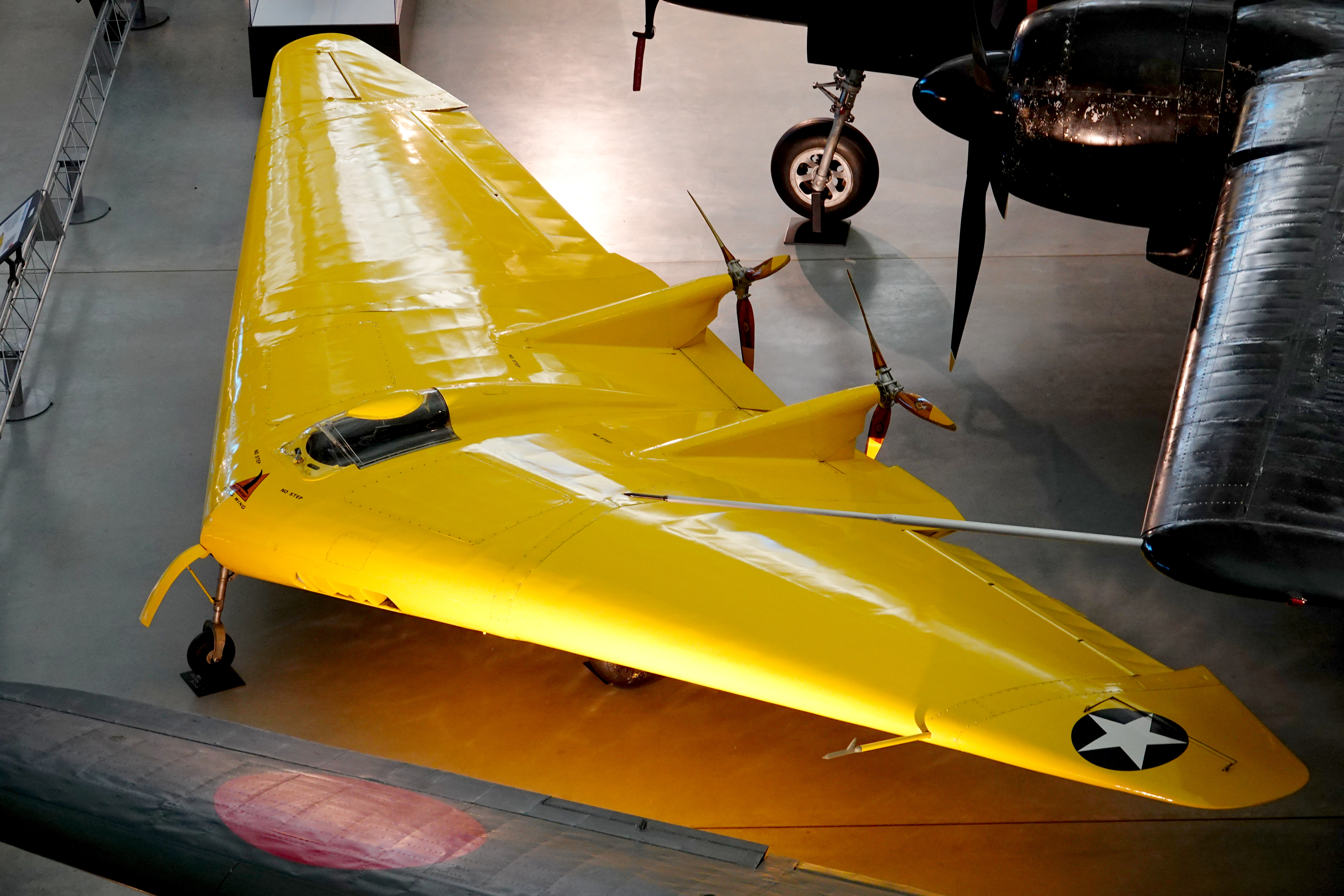
- Northrop N-1M on display at the National Air and Space Museum's Steven F. Udvar-Hazy Center. Restored to its final flight configuration.

General information
- Type: Flying wing
- National origin: United States
- Manufacturer: Northrop Corporation
- Designer: Jack Northrop
- Status: Experimental
- Number built: 1

History
- First flight: 3 July 1940
- Retired: 1945
- Developed from: Northrop N-1
- Variant: Northrop N-9M

The Northrop N-1M (Northrop Model 1 Mockup), also known by the nickname "Jeep", is a retired American experimental aircraft used in the development of the flying wing concept by Northrop Aircraft during the 1940s.

== Design and development ==
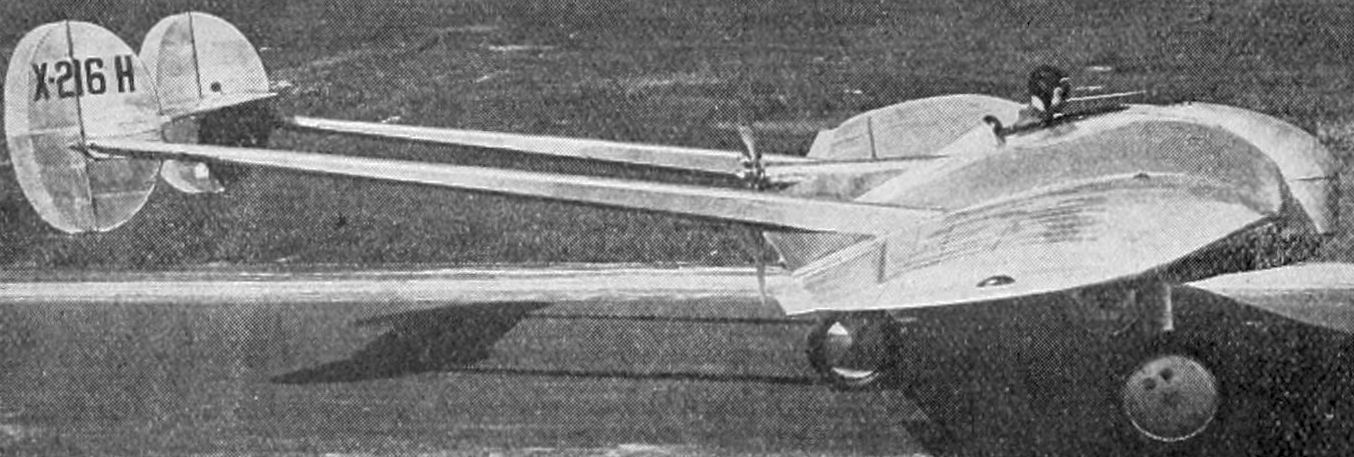
Northrop 1929 flying wing (X-216 H). Photo from Aero Digest March, 1930

Jack Northrop became involved with all-wing aircraft designs in the late 1920s, with his first flying wing research prototype being built in the 1928–1930 time period. That first prototype, registered X-216H, had evolved from earlier design studies but was not yet a true flying wing as it retained a tail unit comprising twin rudders with a single horizontal stabilizer running between them; both rudders were connected by twin booms to the thick, all-wing blended fuselage. The aircraft had an open cockpit in the center wing section and single, rear-facing, pusher propeller connected to a Menasco Cirrus inverted-four piston engine blended into the all-wing shape. X-216H was first flown in 1929 with Edward Bellande at the controls; the aircraft displayed adequate performance and was noted for its unique all-metal stressed skin and multi-cellular construction. At about this same time, Jack Northrop became aware of Walter and Reimar Horten's record-setting "tailless" flying wing glider designs being tested in Germany beginning in 1934.

The N-1M was one of a progression of experimental aircraft that further developed Northrop's all-wing concept. The aircraft was produced in the United States and was developed during 1939 and 1940 as a flying testbed for the purpose of proving Jack Northrop's vision of a practical Flying Wing. Built mostly of specially laminated layers of glued wood, the design of both wooden wings allowed for easy configuration changes with the central blended fuselage, which was made of tubular steel. The aircraft first flew on 3 July 1940 at Baker Dry Lake in California. (Note: Heavily illustrated, authoritative N-1M article.)

== Operational history ==
Northrop's Chief Test Pilot Vance Breese flew the N-1M on its maiden flight, unexpectedly bouncing into the air during a planned high-speed taxi run. He reported that the aircraft could fly no higher than five feet. Flight could only be sustained by maintaining a precise angle of attack, but Theodore von Kármán solved the problem by making adjustments to the trailing edges of the elevons. Control of the aircraft was achieved through the use of a system of elevons and wingtip rudders. The elevons served in tailless type aircraft both as elevators and ailerons, while split flaps on the downward angled wingtips took the place of a conventional rudder; they were later straightened after that angle proved unnecessary during flight testing.

The flight test program continued with Moye W. Stephens, Northrop Test Pilot and Secretary to the Northrop Corporation, serving as a test pilot. Early tests showed the N-1M to be satisfactory in stability and control, but overweight and underpowered. The aircraft's two 65-horsepower (48 kW) Lycoming O-145 four-cylinder engines (buried in the wing to reduce drag) were replaced by two 120-horsepower (89 kW) six-cylinder 6AC264F2 air-cooled Franklin engines. By November 1941, after 28 flights, Stephens reported that when attempting to move the N-1M about its vertical axis, the aircraft had a tendency to "Dutch roll." The oscillations proved to be manageable when adjustments were made to the aircraft's wing configuration.

The N-1M proved to be basically sound, paving the way for Northrop's later and much larger Northrop YB-35 and YB-49 aircraft. The aircraft was donated to the United States Army Air Forces in 1945 and was placed in the storage collection of the National Air Museum the following year. It sat there for nearly three decades, but was brought back to static, non-flying status, in its final flight configuration, after several years of restoration during the 1980s. The N-1M is now on public display at the National Air and Space Museum's Steven F. Udvar-Hazy Center.

== Specifications (N-1M) ==
Data from American X&Y Planes

General characteristics

- Crew: one
- Length: 17 ft 11 in (5.46 m)
- Wingspan: 38 ft 8 in (11.79 m)
- Height: 4 ft 11 in (1.50 m)
- Wing area: 350 sq ft (33 m^{2}) (approx)
- Gross weight: 3,900 lb (1,769 kg)
- Powerplant: 2 × Lycoming O-145 four-cylinder horizontally opposed air-cooled piston engines, 65 hp (48 kW) each (original engines)
- Powerplant: 2 × Franklin 6AC-264F2 six-cylinder air-cooled horizontally opposed piston engines, 117 hp (87 kW) each (after reengining)

Performance

- Maximum speed: 200 mph (320 km/h, 170 kn)
- Range: 300 mi (480 km, 260 nmi)
- Service ceiling: 4,000 ft (1,200 m)

== See also ==
Related development

- Northrop N-1
- Northrop N-9M
- Northrop YB-35
- Northrop YB-49
- Northrop XP-79
