= Northrop YB-49 =

American flying-wing bomber prototype

YB-49
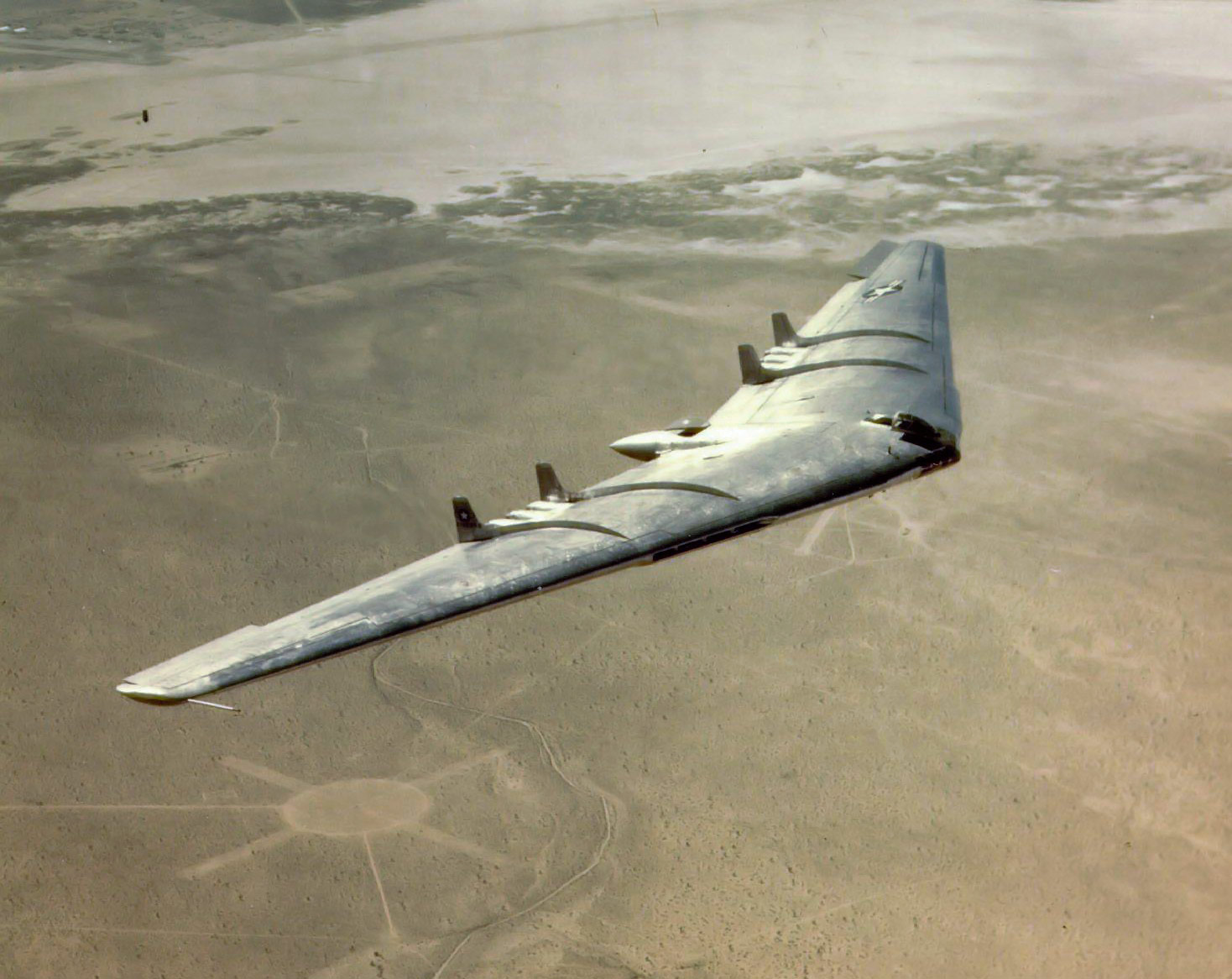
- YB-49

General information
- Type: Strategic bomber
- National origin: United States
- Manufacturer: Northrop Corporation
- Designer: Jack Northrop
- Status: Prototype only
- Primary user: United States Air Force
- Number built: 2 converted from YB-35 one YB-49 one YRB-49a

History
- First flight: 21 October 1947
- Developed from: Northrop YB-35

The Northrop YB-49 was an American prototype jet-powered heavy bomber developed by Northrop Corporation shortly after World War II for service with the United States Air Force. The YB-49 featured a flying wing design and was a turbojet-powered development of the earlier, piston-engined Northrop XB-35 and YB-35. The two YB-49s built were both converted YB-35 test aircraft.

The YB-49 never entered production, being passed over in favor of the more conventional Convair B-36 piston-driven design. Design work performed during the development of the YB-35 and YB-49 nonetheless proved invaluable to Northrop decades later when the company was tasked with developing the B-2 stealth bomber, which entered service in the early 1990s.

== Design and development ==
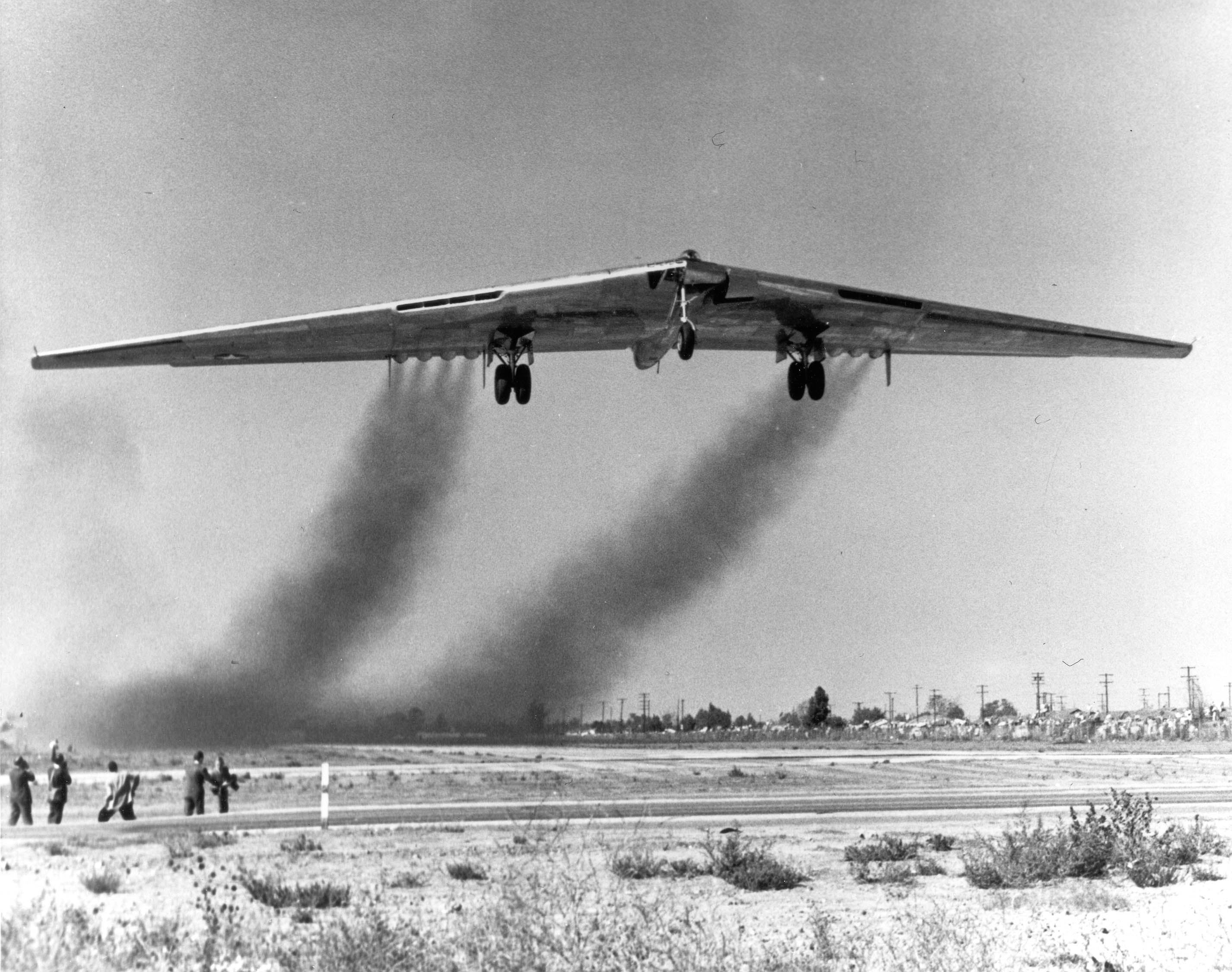
YB-49 takes to the air for the first time.

With the XB-35 program seriously behind schedule by 1944, and the end of piston-engined combat aircraft in sight, the production contract for this propeller-driven type was cancelled in May of that year. Nevertheless, the Flying Wing design was still sufficiently interesting to the Air Force that work was continued on testing a single YB-35A production aircraft.

Among the aircraft later completed were two airframes that the Air Force ordered be fitted with jet propulsion and designated as YB-49s. The first of these new YB-49 jet-powered aircraft flew on 22 October 1947 (from Northrop airfield in Hawthorne, CA) and immediately proved more promising than its piston engined counterpart. The YB-49 set an unofficial endurance record of staying continually above 40,000 ft (12,200 m) for 6.5 hours.

The second YB-49 was lost when it crashed on June 5, 1948, killing its pilot, Major Daniel Forbes (for whom Forbes Air Force Base was named), co-pilot Captain Glen Edwards (for whom Edwards Air Force Base is named), and three other crew members, one of whom, 1st Lieutenant Edward Lee Swindell, was a crew member on the Boeing B-29 that assisted Chuck Yeager in breaking the sound barrier in the Bell X-1 aircraft. Their aircraft suffered structural failure, with both outer wing sections becoming detached from the center section. Speculation at the time was that the YB-49 was lost due to excessive pullout loads imposed on the heavy airframe when a scheduled flight test of the large bomber's stall recovery resulted in a sudden and dramatic high-speed, nose-over dive. The post-stall high-speed dive resulted from the clean, low-drag, all-wing design, which gave the YB-49 a rapid speed increase in any type of dive. Fellow YB-49 test pilot Robert Cardenas later claimed that the YB-49 rotated backwards in stall, and that he warned Edwards about it. Jack Northrop later countered that such a behavior was impossible for the all-wing design.

During flight tests in the 1940s, it was noticed that the aircraft had a small radar cross-section, due to its flying wing design. Decades later, this stealthy detail would prove crucial to the design of Northrop Grumman's advanced, all-wing B-2 bomber.

On 9 February 1949, the first YB-49 flew from Muroc Air Force Base in California to Andrews Air Force Base near Washington, D.C., in 4 hours 25 minutes, after which President Truman ordered a flyby of Pennsylvania Avenue at rooftop level. The return flight from Andrews was marred when four of the eight engines had to be shut down due to oil starvation. Inspection after a successful emergency landing at Winslow Airport, Arizona, revealed no oil had been replaced in these engines at Wright after the Muroc-to-Andrews leg, raising a suspicion of industrial sabotage.

The last operational YB-49 prototype was destroyed on 15 March 1950, during high-speed taxi trials at Muroc Field. The nose wheel began to encounter severe vibration problems and finally collapsed; the aircraft was completely destroyed in the ensuing fire. The taxi trials took place with the YB-49's fuel tanks full, an unusual testing procedure, fanning further speculation of industrial sabotage of the aircraft.

Bombing target tests showed a tendency of flying wings to "hunt" in yaw after turns and when flying in "disturbed" air, degrading bombing accuracy. It was thought that one of the new Honeywell autopilots, with yaw damping, would correct this flaw. Northrop chief test pilot on the YB-35 and YB-49 programs Max Stanley contends in the 1992 Discovery Channel documentary "The Wing Will Fly", the adaptation of the autopilot in this dual function "damped out the directional oscillations to the degree where... I think you would say it met the (military) specifications." Brig. General Robert Cardenas also flew the YB-49 during many of its test flights, praising the aircraft for its marvelous performance, while also noting the YB-49 required a very long bomb run to damp directional oscillations. Many of these challenges would eventually be overcome when fly-by-wire systems were developed in the 1950s, which were first used in regular production for the Convair B-58 Hustler and then when computer-generated artificial stability became available in the 1970s, culminating in the development of the all-wing Northrop Grumman B-2 Spirit Stealth Bomber.

The conversion of the long-range XB-35 to jet power essentially cut the effective range of the aircraft in half, putting it in the medium-range bomber category with Boeing's new swept-winged jet bomber the B-47 Stratojet. The B-47 was optimized for high-altitude and high-speed flight and, in an era where speed and altitude were becoming increasingly important, the YB-49's thick airfoil could never be maximized for high-speed performance. In the same Discovery Channel documentary, former Air Force Flight Test Center Historian Dr. James Young states his opinion that while political gamesmanship and back room dealing certainly played a role in the aircraft's demise, the Flying Wing program was ultimately cancelled for solid technological reasons.

== Operational history ==
In June 1948, the Air Force ordered the type into full production as the RB-49A reconnaissance aircraft (company designations N-38 and N-39). It was powered by six jet engines, two of them externally mounted in under-wing pods, ruining the aircraft's sleek, aerodynamic lines, but extending its range by carrying additional fuel. The use of jet engines had resulted in considerably increased fuel consumption and decreased its range significantly below that of the rival Convair B-36. One YB-35 airframe (s/n 42-102369) was chosen as the prototype for the RB-49 and designated YRB-49A.

During early 1950, the remaining YB-35Bs airframes, which were being converted to YRB-49As, were ordered scrapped. Flight testing of the sole remaining YB-49 prototype ended 14 March 1950. On 15 March 1950, that program was canceled. Coincidentally, the sole remaining YB-49 prototype suffered a high-speed taxiing accident and, as previously noted, was totally destroyed in the ensuing fire.

Only two months later, all Flying Wing contracts were canceled abruptly without explanation by order of Stuart Symington, Secretary of the Air Force.

All remaining Flying Wing bomber airframes, except for the sole YRB-49A reconnaissance version, were ordered chopped up by Symington, the materials smelted down using portable smelters brought to Northrop's facility, in plain sight of its employees. Jack Northrop retired from both the company he founded and aviation shortly after he saw his dream of a pure, all-wing aircraft destroyed. His son, John Northrop Jr., later recounted during an interview his father's devastation and lifelong suspicion that his Flying Wing project had been sabotaged by political influence and back room wheeling-and-dealing between Convair and the Air Force.

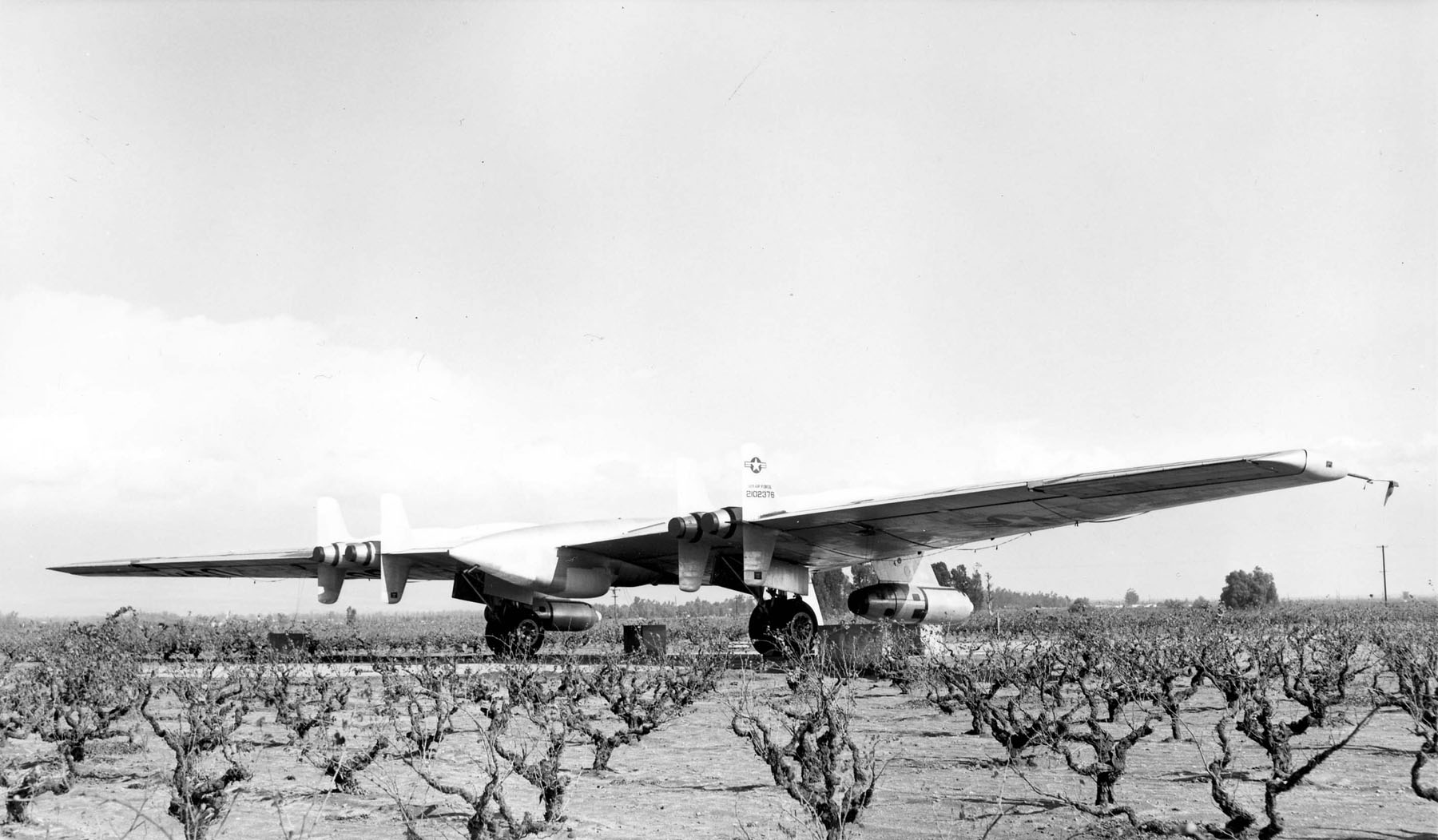
Northrop YRB-49A with six engines, two of which are mounted externally

The sole prototype reconnaissance platform, the YRB-49A, first flew on 4 May 1950. After only 13 flights, testing ended abruptly on 26 April 1951. It was then flown back to Northrop's headquarters from Edwards Air Force Base (formerly Muroc AAF) on what would be its last flight. There, this remaining flying wing sat abandoned at the edge of Northrop's airport in Hawthorne for more than two years. It was finally ordered scrapped on 1 December 1953.

In a 1979 videotaped news interview, Jack Northrop broke his long silence and said publicly that all Flying Wing contracts had been canceled because Northrop Aircraft Corporation refused to merge with competitor Convair at Air Force Secretary Stuart Symington's strong suggestion, because, according to Jack Northrop, Convair's merger demands were "grossly unfair to Northrop." Allegations of political influences in the cancellation of the Flying Wing were investigated by the House Armed Services Committee, where Symington publicly denied exerting pressure on Northrop to merge.

Northrop's Flying Wing program may have been terminated due to its technical difficulties and the program being behind schedule and over budget. Another possible contributing factor to the cancellation may have been Northrop spreading its small engineering staff too widely in other experimental programs. While the competing propeller-driven Convair B-36 "Peacemaker" was an obsolete World War II-era design by this time, and had been having just as many or even more development problems, the Air Force seemed to have greater confidence that its more conventional design and "teething" problems could be overcome, when compared to those of the more radical Flying Wing. While the YB-49 had well-documented performance and design issues, the B-36 program needed more development money. When the YB-49 jet bomber was canceled, Northrop was awarded a much smaller, lower profile production contract for its straight-winged F-89 Scorpion fighter as compensation for the canceled Flying Wing.

The YB-49 and its modern counterpart, the B-2 Spirit, both built either by Northrop or Northrop Grumman, have the same wingspan: 172.0 ft (52.4 m). Flight test data collected from the original YB-49 test flights were used in the development of the B-2 bomber. Shortly before his death in February 1981, Jack Northrop learned from the Northrop Corporation of the company's flying wing bid for the future B-2; he remarked: "I know why God has kept me alive for the past 25 years." The new bomber would be publicly displayed for the first time in 1988.

== Notable appearances in media ==
Paramount Pictures' 1953 film, The War of the Worlds, depicts a YB-49 dropping an atomic bomb on the invading Martians. The feature film, produced by George Pal and directed by Byron Haskin, incorporates Northrop color footage of a YB-49 test flight, originally used in Paramount's Popular Science theatrical shorts of the era.

== Specifications (YB-49) ==
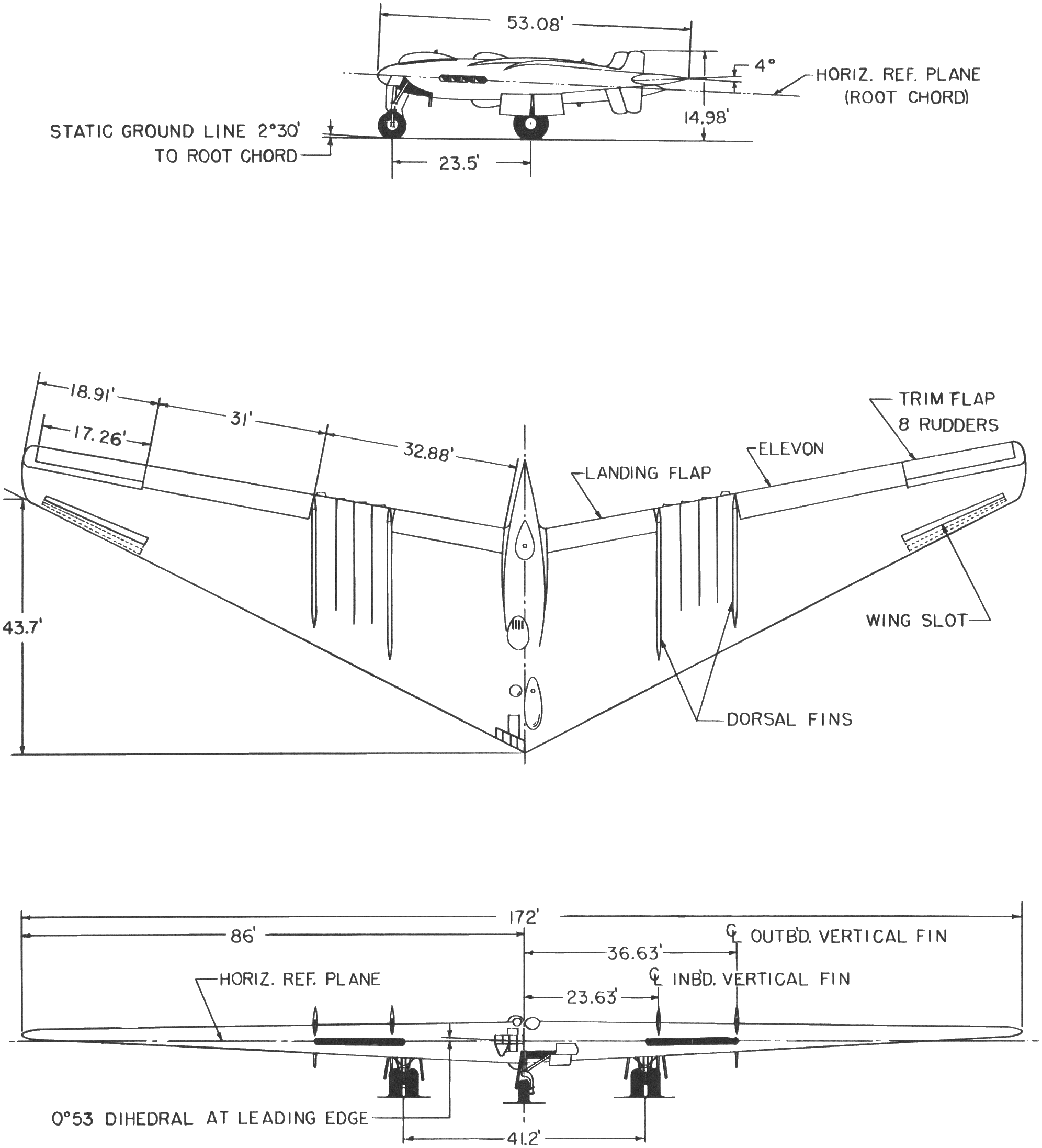
3-view line drawing of the Northrop YB-49

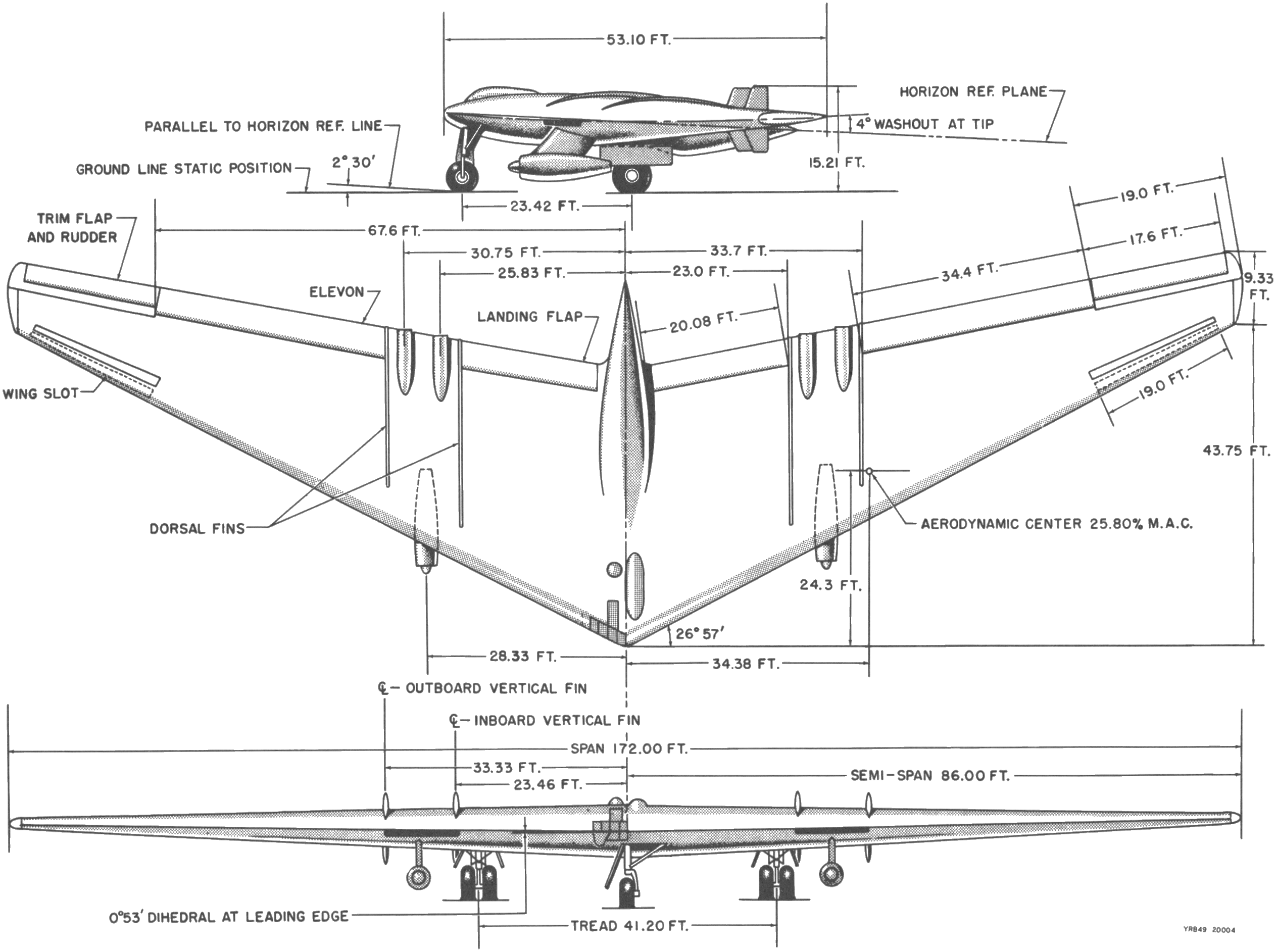
3-view line drawing of the Northrop YRB-49A

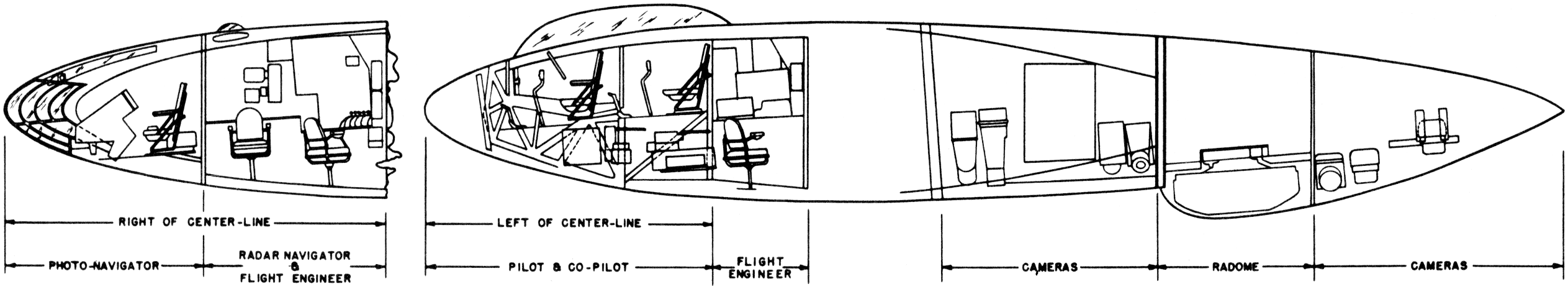
cross section drawing of the Northrop YB-35B

Data from National Museum of the United States Air Force, and U.S. Standard Aircraft Characteristics

General characteristics

- Crew: 6
- Length: 53 ft 1 in (16.18 m)
- Wingspan: 172 ft 0 in (52.43 m)
- Height: 15 ft 2 in (4.62 m)
- Wing area: 4,000 sq ft (370 m^{2})
- Aspect ratio: 7.2
- Airfoil: root: NACA 65_{3}-019; tip: NACA 65_{3}-018
- Empty weight: 88,442 lb (40,117 kg)
- Gross weight: 133,569 lb (60,586 kg)
- Max takeoff weight: 193,938 lb (87,969 kg)
- Powerplant: 8 × Allison J35-A-15 turbojet engines, 4,000 lbf (18 kN) thrust each

(6 × 5,000 lbf (22 kN) Allison J35-A-19 engines on YRB-49)

Performance

- Maximum speed: 493 mph (793 km/h, 428 kn)
- Cruise speed: 365 mph (587 km/h, 317 kn)
- Combat range: 4,000 mi (6,400 km, 3,500 nmi) Other sources say 2,806 with 10,000 lb (4,536 kg) bombload, 365 Knots in 8:27 hours with 10,000 lbs of bombs.
- Service ceiling: 45,700 ft (13,900 m)
- Rate of climb: 3,785 ft/min (19.23 m/s)
- Wing loading: 33 lb/sq ft (160 kg/m^{2})
- Thrust/weight: 0.23
- Take-off run: 4850 ft
- Take-off distance to 50 ft (15 m): 5850 ft

Armament

- Guns: 4 × .50 in (12.7 mm) machine guns (to be mounted in rotating "stinger" tail cone on all production aircraft)
- Bombs: 16,000 lb (7,260 kg) of ordnance

== See also ==
- Northrop Grumman B-2 Spirit
- Northrop Grumman B-21 Raider

Related development

- Northrop N-1
- Northrop N-1M
- Northrop N-9M
- Northrop YB-35

Aircraft of comparable role, configuration, and era

- Horten Ho 229
- Horten H.XVIII

Related lists

- List of bomber aircraft
- List of flying wings
- List of military aircraft of the United States
