= Northrop YB-35 =

American flying-wing bomber prototype

YB-35
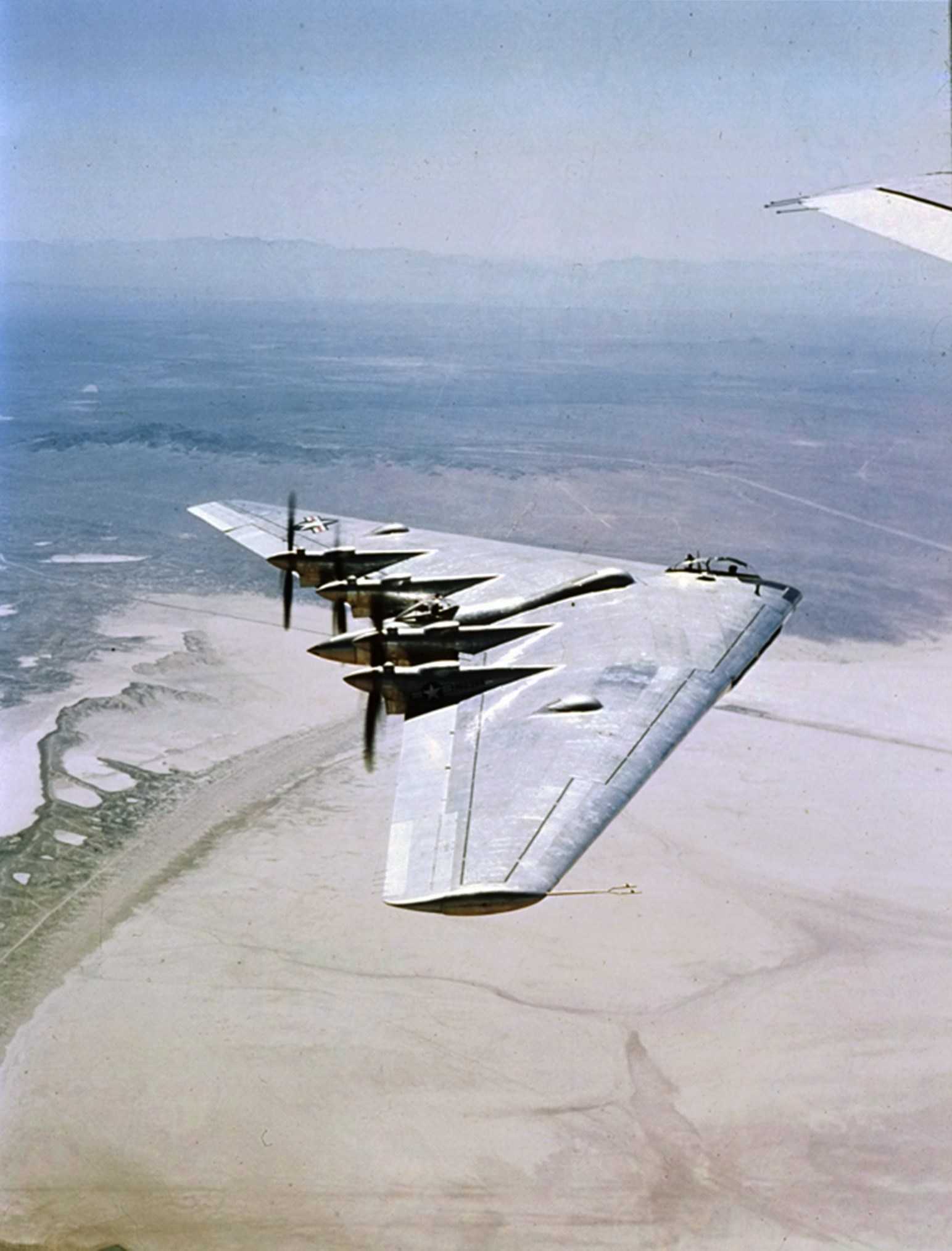
- YB-35 prototype

General information
- Type: Strategic bomber
- National origin: United States
- Manufacturer: Northrop
- Designer: Jack Northrop
- Status: Canceled
- Primary user: United States Air Force
- Number built: 14 (Including 1 experimental version)

History
- First flight: 25 June 1946
- Retired: 1948-1949
- Variant: Northrop YB-49

The Northrop YB-35, Northrop designation N-9 or NS-9, was an experimental heavy bomber aircraft developed by the Northrop Corporation for the United States Army Air Forces during and shortly after World War II. The airplane used the radical and potentially very efficient flying wing design, in which the tail section and fuselage are eliminated and all payload is carried in a thick wing. Only prototypes and pre-production aircraft were built, although interest remained strong enough to warrant further development of the design as a jet bomber, under the designation YB-49.

== Design and development ==
The B-35 was the brainchild of Jack Northrop, who made the flying wing the focus of his work during the 1930s. In 1941, before the United States entered World War II, Northrop and Consolidated Vultee Corporation had been commissioned to develop a large wing-only, long-range bomber designated XB-35 and XB-36 respectively. Northrop advocated a "flying wing" as a means of reducing parasitic drag and eliminating structural weight not directly responsible for producing lift. Consolidated Vultee proposed a more conventional design with fuselage and tail, which was much larger and heavier. In theory, the B-35 could carry a greater payload faster, farther, and cheaper than a conventional bomber.

In December 1941, the Army Air Forces awarded prototype contracts to both Northrop and Consolidated Vultee for a bomber that could carry 4,500 kg (10,000 lb) of bombs to a round-trip mission of 16,000 km (10,000 mi). Requested performance was a maximum speed of 720 km/h (450 mph), cruise speed of 443 km/h (275 mph), and service ceiling of 14,000 m (45,000 ft). This aircraft would be able to bomb Nazi-occupied Europe in the event that Britain fell (this was similar to Nazi Germany's own Amerikabomber program design competition through the RLM, itself initiated in the spring of 1942). The original April 1941 USAAC proposal was first submitted to Boeing and Consolidated Aircraft Company and led to the production of the Convair B-36. In May, one month before the USAAF was created, the contract was also extended to include Northrop, inviting it to submit a design along the lines it was already exploring.

Since the new aircraft would require a significant amount of engineering work in untested waters, the first order placed was actually for two prototypes of the XB-35, and included Northrop's plan to also build two all-wood one-third scale flying models to measure performance and stability; these were dubbed the Northrop N-9M (M standing for model). This aircraft would be used to gather flight test data on the Flying Wing design. Jack Northrop also hired part-time the leading aeronautical designer of the day Theodore von Kármán, to evaluate and who approved of Northrop's initial design, and to start building the tooling for building the prototypes ... as explained in detail in the book "Goodbye Beautiful Wing" by Terrence O'Neill (ISBN 978-0979012129). The N9Ms would also be used as a flight trainer, to familiarize pilots with the radical, all-wing concept.

Early in 1942, design work on the XB-35 itself began in earnest. Unlike conventional aircraft, truly "tailless" flying wings do not have a rudder for lateral control, so a set of clamshell-like, double split flaps (so-called flaperon, a portmanteau of flap and aileron) on the trailing edge of the wingtips were used. When aileron control was input, they were deflected up or down as a single unit, just like an aileron. When rudder input was made, the two surfaces on one side opened, top and bottom, creating drag, and yawing the aircraft. By applying input to both rudder pedals, both sets of surfaces were deployed creating drag so that the airspeed or the glide angle could be manipulated.

== Variants ==
=== XB-35 ===
On 22 November 1941, the United States Army Air Forces (USAAF, or AAF) signed the development contract for an XB-35; the contract included an option for a second aircraft, which was exercised on 2 January 1942. The first was to be delivered in November 1943, the second in April of the next year.

Detailed engineering began in early 1942. A fuselage-like crew cabin was to be embedded inside the wing; it included a tail cone protruding from the trailing edge. This tail cone would contain the remote sighting stations for the bomber's gunners and a cluster of rear-firing machine guns in the production aircraft. In the midsection of the cabin, there were folding bunks for off-duty crew on long missions. The aircraft's bomb load was to be carried in six smaller bomb bays, three in each wing section, fitted with roll-away doors; this original design precluded the carrying of large bombs, and the early atomic bombs, without bomb bay redesign and modifications. Production aircraft would have defensive armament of twenty 0.5 in (12.7 mm) machine guns or 20 mm cannon, carried in six turrets, two turrets along the aircraft's center line, four above and below the outer wings, and four in the "stinger" tail cone. The B-35 would take advantage of a new aluminum alloy devised by Alcoa; it was considerably stronger than any alloy used previously.

In June 1946, the XB-35 made its first flight, a 45-minute trip from Hawthorne, California, to Muroc Dry Lake, without incident. The XB-35's engines and propellers were AAF property and had not been tested for engine-propeller compatibility by either Pratt & Whitney, Hamilton Standard, or by the AAF which bought them at Wright Field without testing them or assuring reliability, and then shipped them to Northrop. Microfilmed records of reports and correspondence of the XB-35 program relate that after three or four flights, power plant and propeller vibrations increased, and the very efficient contra-rotating propellers began failing with frustrating frequency. Meetings were called by Northrop, of the AAF, Pratt & Whitney and Hamilton Standard where no one would take responsibility for correcting the AAF's engines and propellers. In addition, the AAF failed to supply the AC electrical alternator, insisting on Northrop using an onboard auxiliary power unit (APU) unit driven by an automotive engine which limited the high-altitude, high-speed XB-35 to test flights below 15,000 ft (4,600 m). The AAF also refused to allow Northrop proposed modification of the bomb bays to carry the standard Mk. 3 atomic bomb, while at the same time declaring the AF would not buy the bomber unless it could carry the A-bomb. Northrop reluctantly agreed to try a single-rotation propeller, which slightly increased takeoff distance and a reduced rate-of-climb and maximum speed.

YB-35 Flying Wing showing its quartet of pusher contra-rotating propellers. The option was later discarded due to severe vibration in flight and later changed to the traditional single propeller configuration.

Problems with the quartet of contra-rotating propellers' shafts comprising each aircraft's drive-line system continued until finally Jack Northrop himself grounded the XB-35s until the government fixed their propulsion system. Concurrently, the AAF ordered Northrop to convert two of the YB-35 airframes to YB-49s, essentially substituting eight jet engines for four reciprocating engines. As a result, the airframe promptly flew to more than 40,000 ft (12,000 m) and topped 520 mph (840 km/h) in flight tests, verifying the XB-35 air frame's aerodynamics, but at the price of range. The prop-version had a design range capable of reaching targets 4,000 mi (6,400 km) away, but the jet-engine version's range was cut nearly in half. The new version disqualified it for the Air Force's top-priority mission as a strategic bomber, which at that time meant striking at the USSR's industrial and military complexes in the Ural Mountains. The Air Force, itself involved in a confusion of rank and job changes, eventually cancelled the XB-35 project, while continuing testing the B-35 airframe as the YB-49, even ordering 30 of the jet-powered bombers after the first YB-49 crashed. The first and second XB-35s were scrapped on 23 and 19 August 1949, respectively.

=== YB-35 ===
On 30 September 1943, 13 pre-production YB-35s were ordered by the Army Air Force. The first one did not fly until 15 May 1948. While some Air Force generals felt the piston engines made the B-35 obsolete, it remained superior in overall performance and range to its competitor, the Convair B-36, and General Hoyt Vandenberg wrote that only the B-35 and the B-36 had adequate range for the Air Force's primary mission, and nothing comparable would be available until the mid-1950s. Only the first YB-35 was ever flown. Multiple flight testing demonstrated that it was airworthy; it was then parked and ignored for more than a year until being scrapped on 20 July 1949. The unfinished YB-35 #2, was scrapped almost a month later, on 19 August 1949. The other 11 of 13 YB-35 aircraft ordered underwent conversion to other power plants.

=== YB-49 ===
Two of those airframes were converted to use eight Allison J35 jet engines and designated YB-49. The second YB-35 converted to a YB-49 all-jet airframe crashed after Air Force test pilot Forbes pulled the outer wing panels off during stall tests at 4.8 g_{0} (47 m/s^{2}). The first YB-35 airframe jet-modified to a YB-49 completed all stall tests and even demonstrated recovery from a spin. It was later destroyed after the Flying Wing's forward landing gear strut and wheel collapsed after encountering high vibration during a highly unusual taxi test procedure made with the engine's fuel tanks full, causing a fire that spread rapidly. Seven incomplete airframes began conversion to jet power as YB-49B but were never finished.

=== YRB-49A ===
A third YB-35 airframe was converted to use six jet engines (two placed in under wing pods) for use as a long-range reconnaissance aircraft, designated YRB-49A. After only a few months, the Air Force's order for 30 YRB-49As was suddenly cancelled without explanation. The sole YRB-49A built flew 13 test flights and then was returned to Northrop's Ontario Airport. The last of Northrop's big Flying Wings sat abandoned at the airport's edge for two years and was finally ordered scrapped on 1 December 1953.

=== EB-35B ===
In order to test the advanced Northrop T37 Turbodyne turboprop engine, produced by a Northrop subsidiary, the ultimate YB-35A was to be converted to a single EB-35B test aircraft (in this case the prefix "E" for the designation meant "Exempt," not the later Electronic). The test aircraft would use two of the powerful T37 engines, each driving a pair of contra-rotating, paddle-blade propellers; the first planned ground tests were to be made using a single T37 engine. When the EB-35B project was canceled, the Air Force had Northrop's Turbodyne engine name, all its patents, and technical data reassigned to General Electric.

=== XB2T ===
The XB2T-1 was a U.S. Navy designation for one YB-35 airframe to be used for development trials; the project was canceled while still in the planning stage.

== Operational history ==
The U.S. Army Air Forces had originally ordered 200 production model B-35s. Since Northrop's facilities were not up to the task of producing them, the Glenn L. Martin Company agreed to undertake mass production. This proved irrelevant when the aircraft had too many development problems. Even disregarding these, so many of Martin's engineers had been drafted by 1944 that Martin pushed the first delivery date back to 1947. Seeing that it would almost certainly never be ready in time for the war, the Army Air Forces canceled the production contract, though the Air Technical Services Command continued to run the program for research purposes.

Actual flight tests of the aircraft revealed several problems: the contra-rotating props caused constant heavy drive-shaft vibration and the government-supplied gearboxes had frequent malfunctions and reduced the effectiveness of propeller control. After only 19 flights, Northrop grounded the first XB-35; the second aircraft was grounded after eight test flights. During this time, the contra-rotating propellers were removed and replaced with four-blade single-rotation propellers. In addition to having continued drive shaft vibration problems, the new single-rotation props greatly reduced the aircraft's speed and performance. Furthermore, the intricate exhaust system turned into a fiasco to maintain. After only two years of use, the engines already showed signs of metal fatigue.

In the end, the program was terminated due to its technical difficulties and the obsolescence of its reciprocating propeller engines, and the fact it was far behind schedule and over budget. Another contributing factor to the program's failure was the tendency of Northrop to become engaged in many experimental programs, which spread its small engineering staff far too wide. While the competing propeller-driven B-36 was obsolete by that time and had just as many or even more development problems, the Air Force needed a very long-range, post-war atomic bomber to counter the perceived Soviet threat. It had more faith that the B-36's "teething" problems could be overcome, compared to those of the new and radical "Flying Wing", the unofficial name that was later associated with all the Northrop "all-wing" designs.

There are long-standing conspiracy theories about the cancellation of the Flying Wing program; specifically, an accusation from Jack Northrop that Secretary of the Air Force Stuart Symington attempted to coerce him to merge his company with the Atlas Corporation-controlled Convair. In a 1979 taped interview, Jack Northrop claimed the Flying Wing contract was cancelled because he would not agree to a merger because Convair's merger demands were "grossly unfair to Northrop." When Northrop refused, Symington supposedly arranged to cancel the B-35 and B-49 program. Symington became president of Convair after he left government service a short time later.

Other observers note that the B-35 and B-49 designs had well-documented performance and design issues while the Convair B-36 needed more development money. At that time, it appeared the B-36 program might be cancelled as well as the B-35. The USAF and the Texas Congressional delegation desired to have a production program for the large Fort Worth aircraft production factory, and Convair had much more effective lobbyists in Washington, DC. The Northrop Corporation was always a technological trailblazer, but the independent nature of Jack Northrop often collided with the political wheeling-and-dealing in Washington that tended to run huge military allocations. Consequently, the B-36 prevailed, with just over 380 aircraft built. Furthermore, earlier the same year, when the YB-49 jet bomber was cancelled, Northrop received a smaller production contract for its F-89 Scorpion fighter as compensation for the lost Flying Wing contract.

== Specifications (YB-35) ==
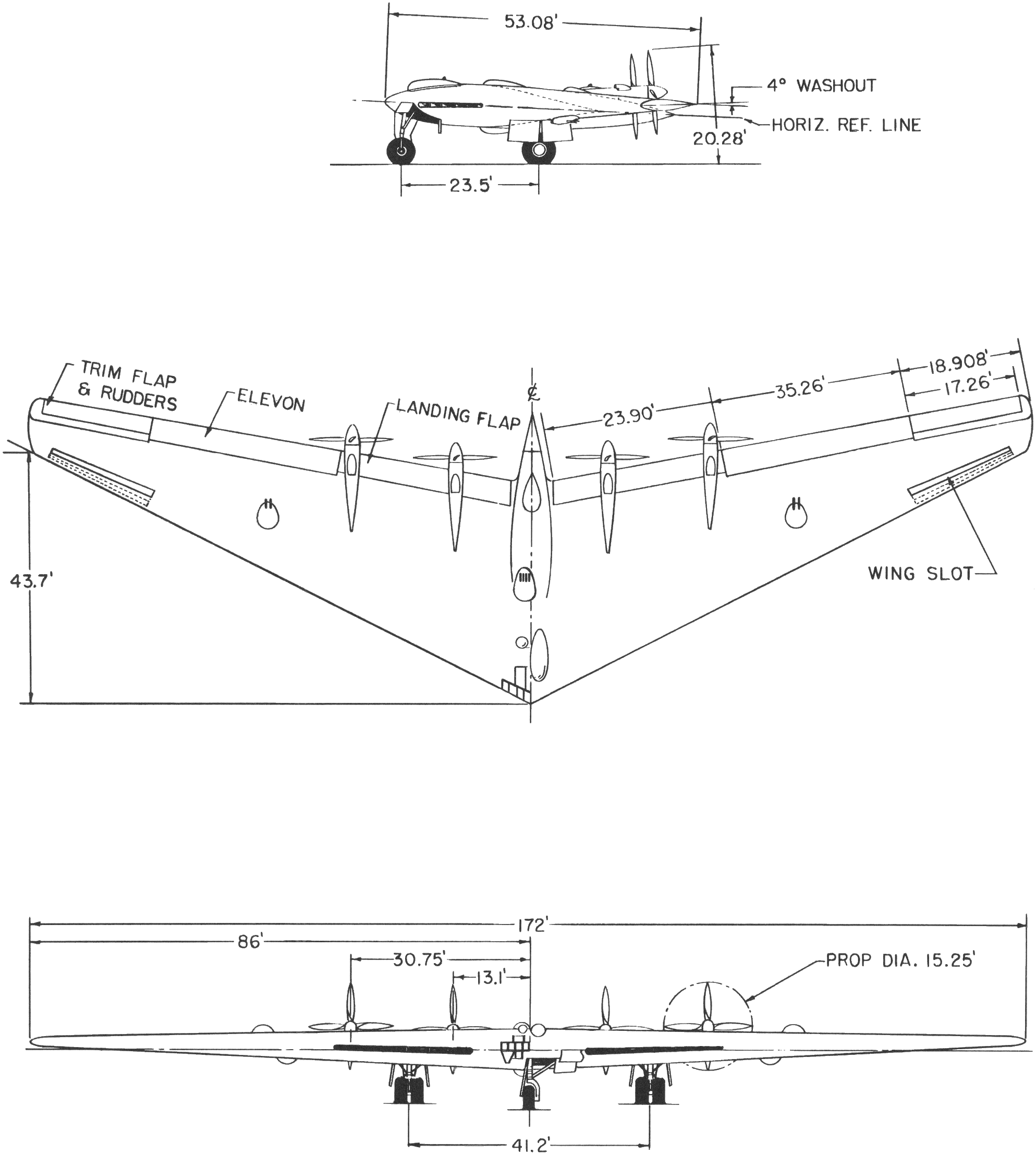
3-view drawing of the Northrop YB-35

Data from Northrop Flying Wings : a history of Jack Northrop's visionary aircraft

General characteristics

- Crew: 9: pilot, copilot, bombardier, navigator, engineer, radio operator, three gunners
- Length: 53 ft 1 in (16.18 m)
- Wingspan: 172 ft 0 in (52.43 m)
- Height: 20 ft 3.5 in (6.185 m)
- Wing area: 4,000 sq ft (370 m^{2})
- Aspect ratio: 7.4
- Airfoil: root: NACA 65_{3}-019; tip: NACA 65_{3}-018
- Empty weight: 91,000 lb (41,277 kg) with turrets
- Gross weight: 154,000 lb (69,853 kg) with turrets
- Max takeoff weight: 209,000 lb (94,801 kg)
- Fuel capacity: 10,000 US gal (8,300 imp gal; 38,000 L) internal; 18,000 US gal (15,000 imp gal; 68,000 L) with bomb-bay auxiliary tanks fitted
- Powerplant: 2 × Pratt & Whitney R-4360-45 Wasp Major 28-cylinder air-cooled radial piston engines, 3,000 hp (2,200 kW) each mounted left and right outboard

(Pratt & Whitney R-4360-17 Wasp Major with 8-bladed contra-props)

- Powerplant: 2 × Pratt & Whitney R-4360-47 Wasp Major 28-cylinder air-cooled radial piston engines, 3,000 hp (2,200 kW) each mounted left and right inboard

(Pratt & Whitney R-4360-21 Wasp Major with 8-bladed contra-props)

- Propellers: 4-bladed Hamilton Standard HSP24F60-344, 15 ft 3 in (4.65 m) diameter constant-speed fully-feathering pusher propellers

(originally flown with 8-bladed contra-rotating propellers)

Performance

- Maximum speed: 391 mph (629 km/h, 340 kn)
- Cruise speed: 240 mph (390 km/h, 210 kn)
- Range: 7,500 mi (12,100 km, 6,500 nmi)
- Service ceiling: 39,700 ft (12,100 m) (restricted to 20,000 ft (6,096 m) due to APU problems)
- Rate of climb: 625 ft/min (3.18 m/s)
- Wing loading: 45 lb/sq ft (220 kg/m^{2})
- Power/mass: 0.07 hp/lb (0.12 kW/kg)

Armament

- Guns: 20 × .50 in (12.7 mm) M3 Browning machine guns in six remotely controlled turrets and one tail stinger
- Bombs: 52,200 lb (23,678 kg) of bombs, maximum

== See also ==
- Amerikabomber
- Stealth aircraft
- Northrop Grumman B-2 Spirit
- Northrop Grumman B-21 Raider

Related development

- Northrop N-1
- Northrop N-1M
- Northrop N-9M
- Northrop YB-49

Aircraft of comparable role, configuration, and era

- Convair B-36
- Horten Ho 229
- Horten H.XVIII

Related lists

- List of bomber aircraft
- List of flying wing aircraft
- List of military aircraft of the United States
- List of United States Navy aircraft designations (pre-1962)
