= Northrop N-9M =

American flying wing prototype

N-9M
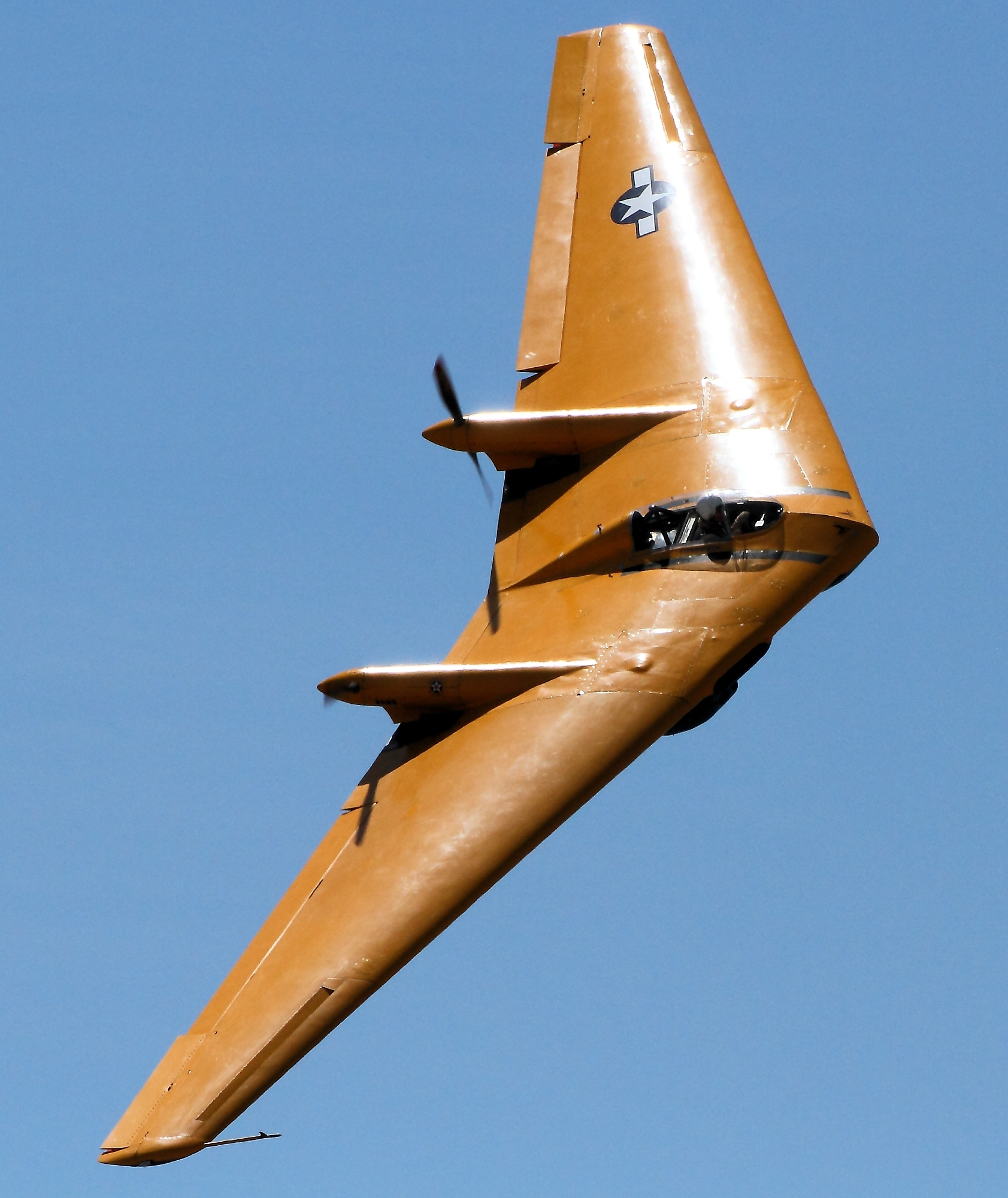
- The restored N-9MB in 2014

General information
- Type: Prototype
- Manufacturer: Northrop Corporation
- Designer: Jack Northrop
- Primary user: United States Air Force
- Number built: 4

History
- First flight: 27 December 1942

The Northrop N-9M was an approximately one-third scale, 60-foot (18 m) span flying wing aircraft used for the development of the full size, 172-foot (52 m) wingspan Northrop XB-35 and YB-35 flying wing long-range, heavy bomber. First flown in 1942, the N-9M (M for Model) was the third in a lineage of all-wing Northrop aircraft designs that began in 1929 when Jack Northrop succeeded in early experiments with his single pusher propeller, twin-tailed, twin-boom, all stressed metal skin Northrop X-216H monoplane, and a decade later, the dual-propeller N-1M of 1939–1941. Northrop's pioneering all-wing aircraft would lead Northrop Grumman many years later to eventually develop the advanced B-2 Spirit stealth bomber, which debuted in 1989 in US Air Force inventory.

== Design and development ==
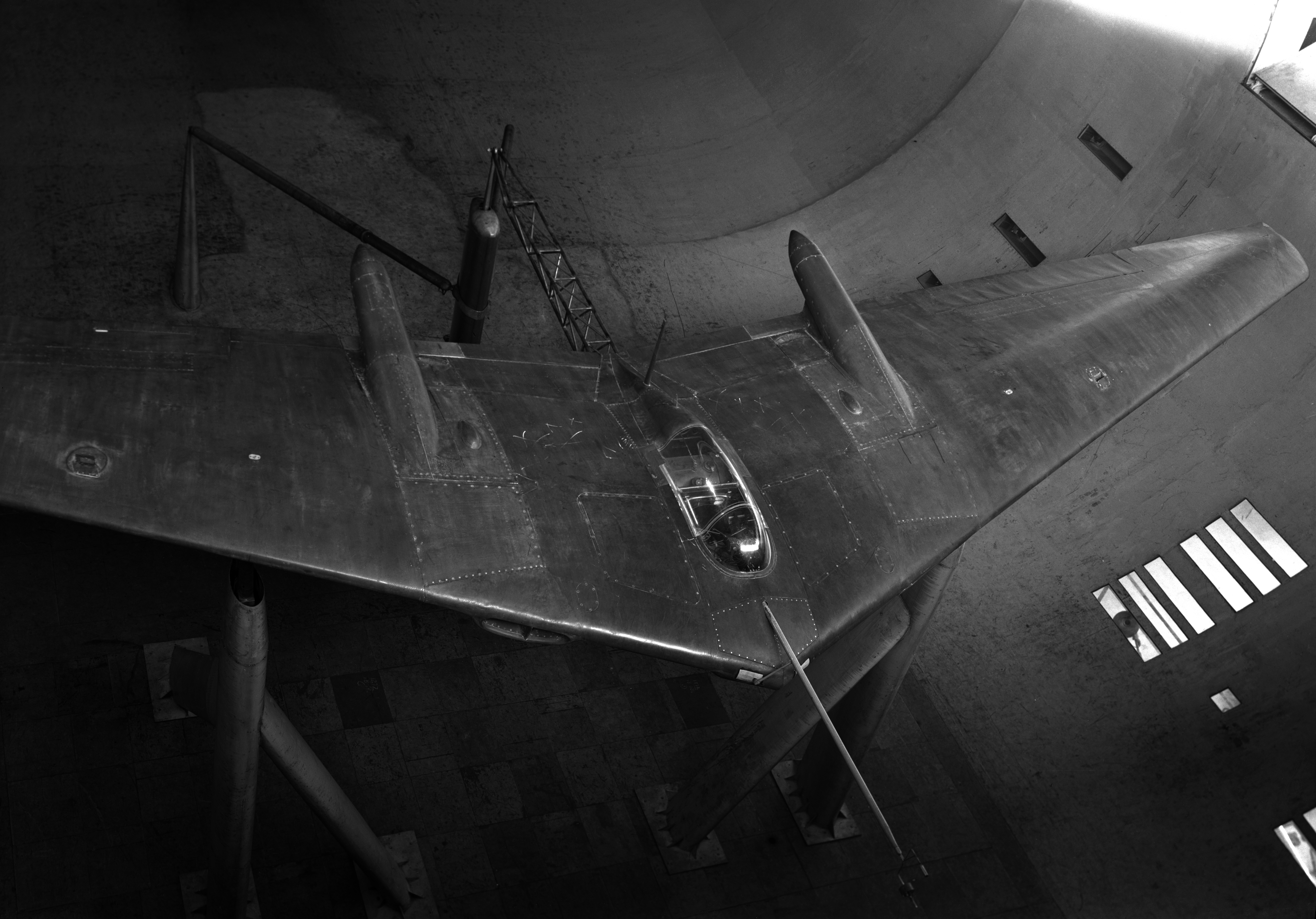
Northrop N9M-2 in the NACA Ames Research Center wind tunnel

On 30 October 1941, the preliminary order for development of the B-35 Flying Wing bomber was confirmed, including engineering, testing, and most importantly a 60 ft (18 m) wingspan, one-third scale aircraft, designated N-9M. It was to be used in gathering data on flight performance and for familiarizing pilots with the program's radical, all-wing design. The first N-9M was ordered in the original contract, but this was later expanded to three test aircraft in early 1943. A fourth was ordered a few months later after a crash of the first N-9M destroyed that airframe; this fourth N-9M incorporated various flight test-derived improvements and upgrades, including different, more powerful engines. The four aircraft were designated N-9M-1, -2, A, and B, respectively.

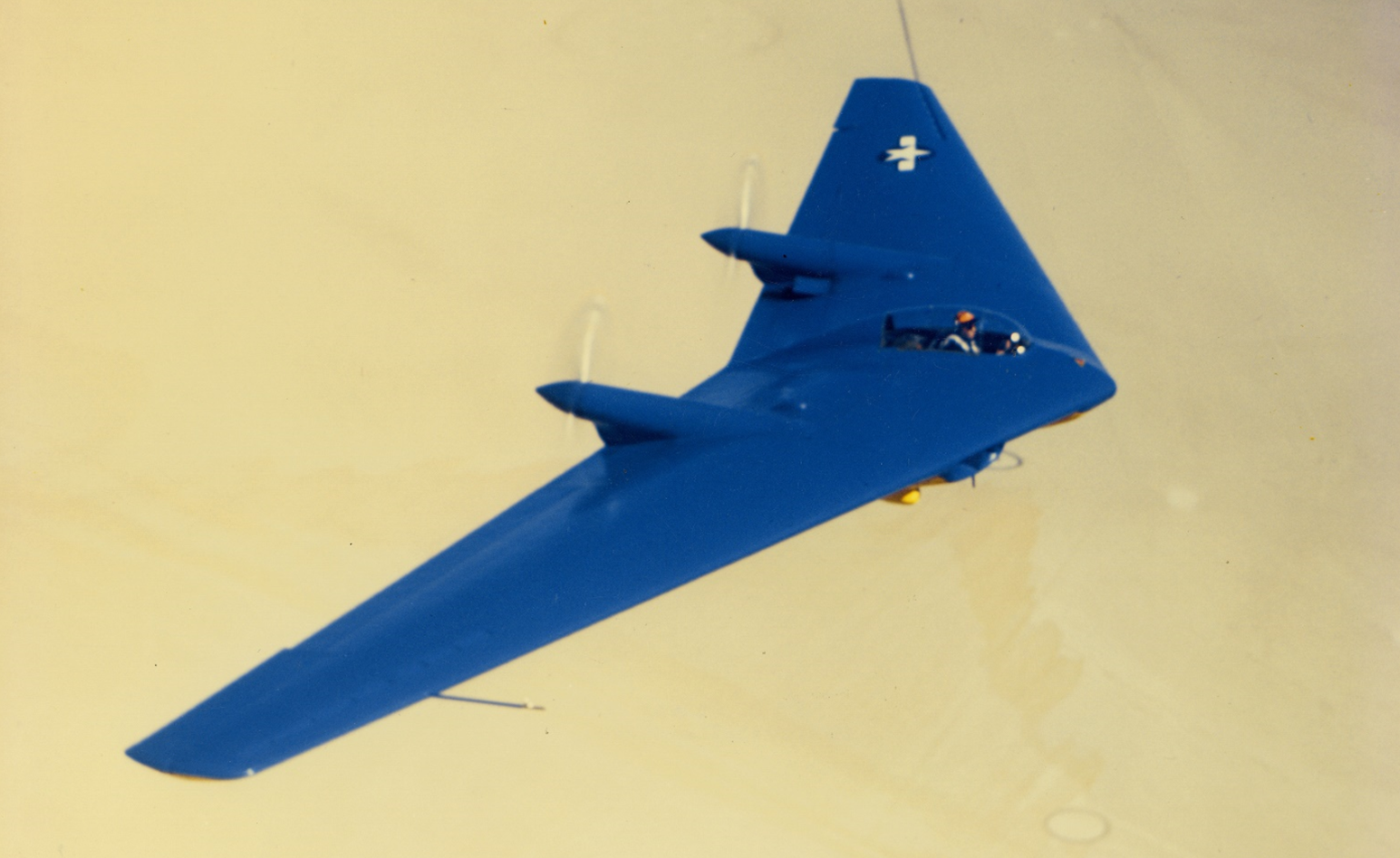
The N-9MA in flight later in the test program with the upper surface painted blue

The N-9M framework was partially constructed of wood to reduce its overall weight. The wings' outer surfaces were also skinned with a strong, specially laminated plywood. The central section (roughly equivalent to the fuselage) was made of welded tubular steel. The aircraft were originally powered by two 290 hp (216 kW) Menasco C6S-1 "Buccaneer" inverted air-cooled straight-six engines, driving twin-bladed propellers, except for the N-9MB which was powered by two 300 hp (224 kW) Franklin XO-540-7 engines.

== Operational history ==
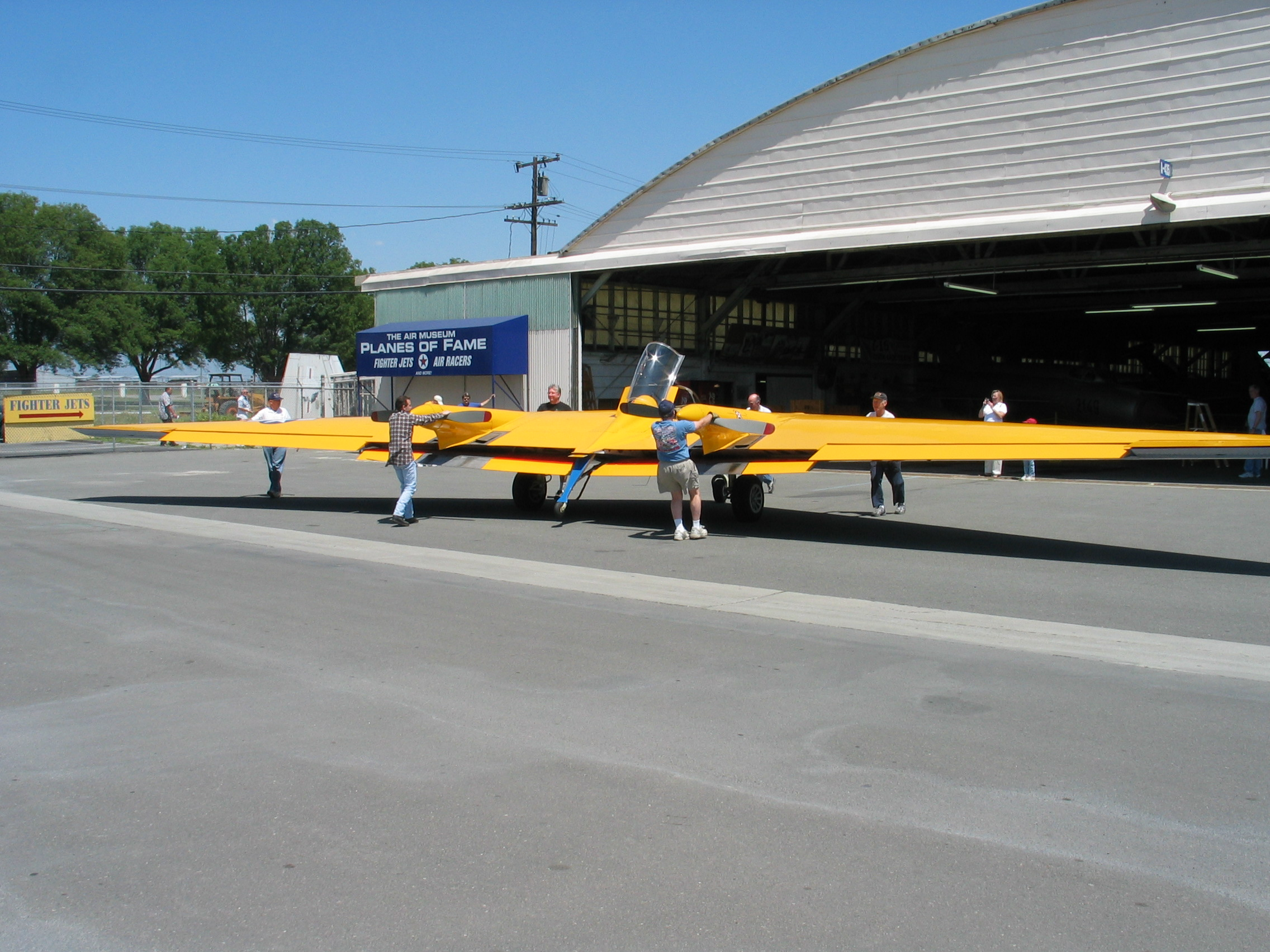
The restored N-9MB Flying Wing at the Planes of Fame Air Museum

The first flight of the N-9M occurred on 27 December 1942 with Northrop test pilot John Myers at the controls. During the next five months, 45 flights were made. Nearly all were terminated by various mechanical failures, the Menasco engines being the primary source of the problems. After roughly 22.5 hours of accumulated flight time, the first N-9M crashed approximately 12 miles (19 km) west of Muroc Army Air Base (now Edwards Air Force Base) on 19 May 1943. The pilot, Max Constant, was killed as he attempted to recover the aircraft from a right-hand, 60° nose-down spin. The investigation found that Constant had suffered control reversal, the control column had been pressed against his chest during his recovery attempt from the steep spin, preventing him from parachuting to safety. Actions were taken to fix this problem and prevent it from happening on other N-9M test aircraft.

When Northrop's Flying Wing bomber program was canceled, all remaining N-9M flight test aircraft, except for the final N-9MB, were scrapped. For more than three decades, it slowly deteriorated until the Chino, California Planes of Fame Air Museum acquired the aircraft in 1982 and began the labor-intensive restoration process. For the next two decades, former Northrop employees and other volunteers restored the N-9MB to its final flight configuration. From 1993, the yellow-and-blue Flying Wing was exhibited, with flight demonstrations at several airshows every year.

In April 2006, the N-9MB suffered an in-flight engine fire. The aircraft was landed safely with limited damage. Donations to the museum were solicited for its repair, and the aircraft was fully repaired to flight status. It was flown again during the annual Chino airshow on 15–16 May 2010.

=== 2019 crash ===
On 22 April 2019, the N-9MB was destroyed shortly after takeoff, when it crashed into a prison yard in Norco, California. The pilot was killed but no ground casualties were reported. The National Transportation Safety Board attributed the crash to the "pilot's loss of control for undetermined reasons", stating that "given the significant fragmentation of the wreckage, the reason for the loss of control could not be determined".

Shortly after take-off from Chino Airport, the aircraft crashed on the grounds of the California Rehabilitation Center, a state prison in Norco, at 12:10 pm local time. The pilot had been performing a test flight at low altitude following the completion of the aircraft's annual inspection. Ground witnesses—including at least one qualified pilot—saw the aircraft flying straight and level at what sounded like a normal cruise power setting when it pitched up into a climb, banked to the left, and then "abruptly" rolled to the right. The engines sputtered as the aircraft rolled inverted, and then increased in volume and RPM as the aircraft went into a "diving right corkscrew turn." Some witnesses described the aircraft wobbling as it turned, and one witness saw the canopy separate from the aircraft. The aircraft then disappeared behind a tree line and a plume of black smoke was seen.

Radar data obtained by the National Transportation Safety Board (NTSB) did not reveal the aircraft's altitude when it departed from level flight. A post-crash fire was extinguished by firefighters.

The pilot and sole aircraft occupant was killed but no ground casualties were reported. The 51-year-old male pilot David Vopat was a certified flight instructor and held an airline transport pilot certificate. He held type ratings for various modern and historical aircraft, and had accrued 20,029 hours of total flight time, including 25 flight hours in the accident aircraft over a 4-year period. He was wearing a parachute during the accident flight.

The NTSB opened an investigation under accident number WPR19FA118. The aircraft crashed in an outpatient housing yard of the prison complex, and had touched down right wingtip first, as evidenced by a ground scar consistent with the green plastic right wing navigation light lens. Most aircraft wreckage was found in an impact crater about 16 ft (4.9 m) long located about 32 ft (9.8 m) from the initial point of impact. Most parts of the left and right propeller assemblies were found within 100 ft (30 m) of the main wreckage site, although one propeller tip was found 474 ft (144 m) away. Two separate portions of the canopy and window structure were found about 60 ft (18 m) and 330 ft (100 m) away from the main impact site, on opposing sides of the aircraft's flight path.

The NTSB recovered the wreckage for further examination. Various parts of the flight control system, propellers and engines were identified, but most showed signs of impact damage, and the engines were "severely fragmented". Various control cables were found separated by impact forces although safety clips or safety wire were still in place. The aircraft seatbelt was found unbuckled. Post-crash toxicological testing found traces of ethanol and pseudoephedrine or ephedrine in the pilot's body, but the NTSB concluded that the concentrations were too small to be a contributing factor, and ruled out alcohol intoxication. The NTSB final report states that the crash was caused by the "pilot's loss of control for undetermined reasons", stating that "given the significant fragmentation of the wreckage, the reason for the loss of control could not be determined from the available information." Based on the eyewitness reports, the unbuckled seatbelt, and the location of the canopy relative to the main impact site, the NTSB said that the pilot may have attempted to egress by parachute, but did not have adequate time to do so before ground impact.

== Specifications (N-9M) ==
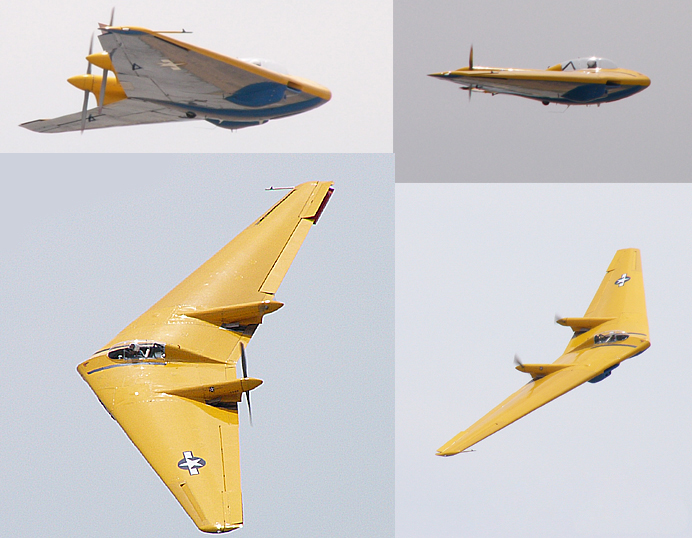
The restored N-9MB Flying Wing being flown at Planes of Fame Air Museum's 2004 airshow, Chino. The museum flew their Flying Wing at several airshows per year.

General characteristics

- Crew: 1
- Length: 17 ft 11.6 in (5.477 m)
- Wingspan: 60 ft 0 in (18.3 m)
- Height: 6 ft 7 in (2 m)
- Wing area: 490 sq ft (45.5 m^{2})
- Airfoil: NACA 65-019
- Empty weight: 5,893 lb (2,673 kg)
- Gross weight: 13,946 lb (6,326 kg)
- Powerplant: 2 × Menasco C6S-4 "Buccaneer" 6-cyl. supercharged inverted air-cooled in-line piston engine, 275 hp (205 kW) each

Performance

- Maximum speed: 258 mph (415 km/h, 224 kn)
- Range: 500 mi (800 km, 430 nmi)
- Service ceiling: 21,500 ft (6,600 m)

== See also ==
Related development

- Northrop N-1
- Northrop N-1M
- Northrop YB-35
- Northrop YB-49
- Northrop XP-79

Aircraft of comparable role, configuration, and era

- Horten Ho 229
- Armstrong Whitworth A.W.52
