= Flying wing =

Tailless fixed-wing aircraft that has no definite fuselage

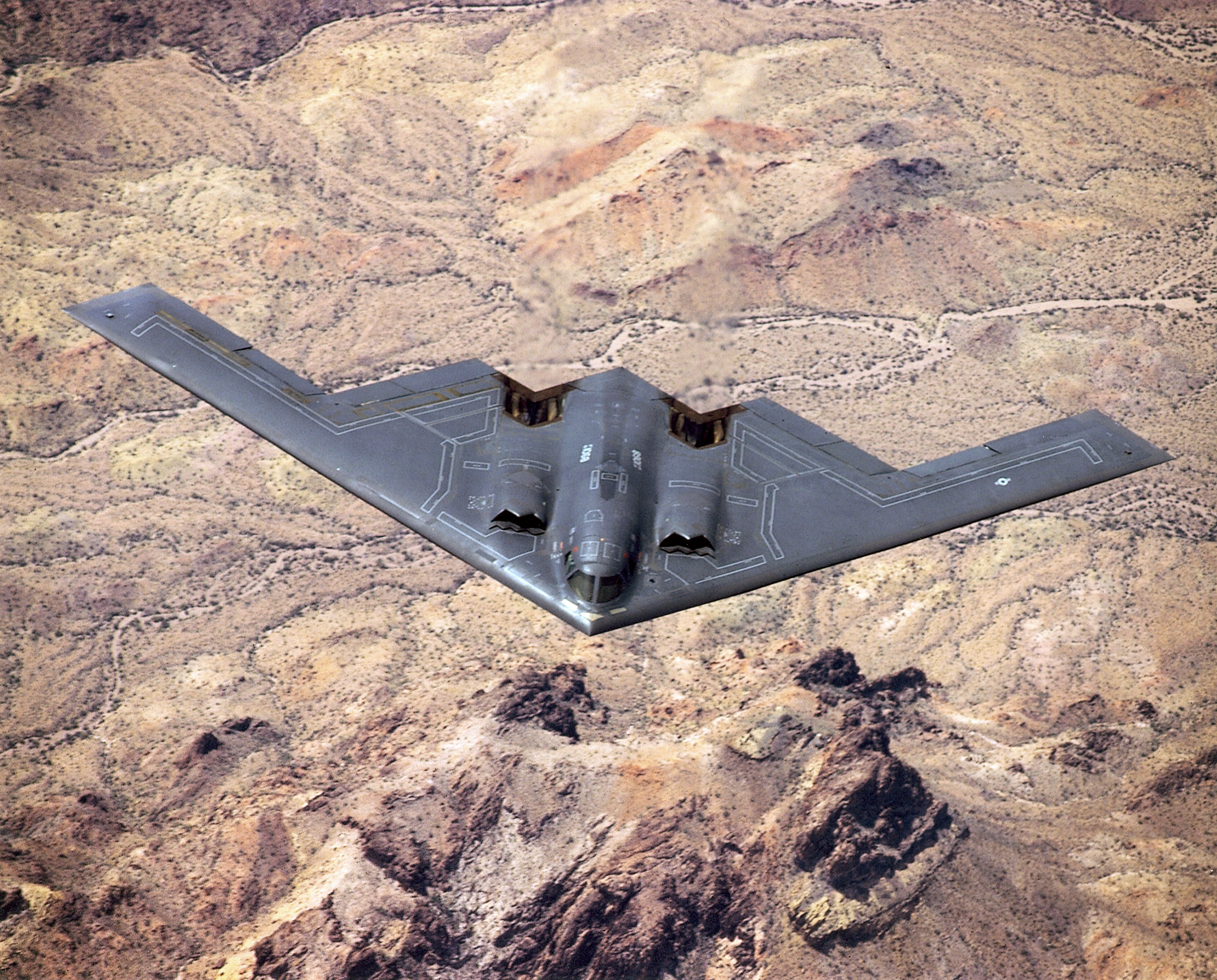
The Northrop B-2 Spirit stealth bomber

A flying wing is a tailless fixed-wing aircraft that has no definite fuselage, with its crew, payload, fuel, and equipment housed inside the main wing structure. A flying wing may have various small protuberances such as pods, nacelles, blisters, booms, or vertical stabilizers.

Similar aircraft designs, that are not technically flying wings, are sometimes casually referred to as such. These types include blended wing body aircraft and lifting body aircraft, which have a fuselage and no definite wings.

Whilst a pure flying wing is theoretically the lowest-drag design configuration for a fixed wing aircraft, a lack of conventional stabilizing surfaces and the associated control surfaces make them unstable and difficult to control.

The basic flying wing configuration became an object of significant study during the 1920s, often in conjunction with other tailless designs. In the Second World War, both Nazi Germany and the Allies made advances in developing flying wings. Military interest in the flying wing waned during the 1950s with the development of supersonic aircraft, but was renewed in the 1980s due to their potential for stealth technology. This approach eventually led to the Northrop Grumman B-2 Spirit stealth bomber. There has been continual interest in using it in the large transport roles for cargo or passengers. Boeing, McDonnell Douglas, and Armstrong Whitworth have undertaken design studies on flying wing airliners; however, no such airliners have yet been built.

The flying wing concept is mostly suited to subsonic aircraft. No flying wing has ever been observed faster than the speed of sound.

== Design ==
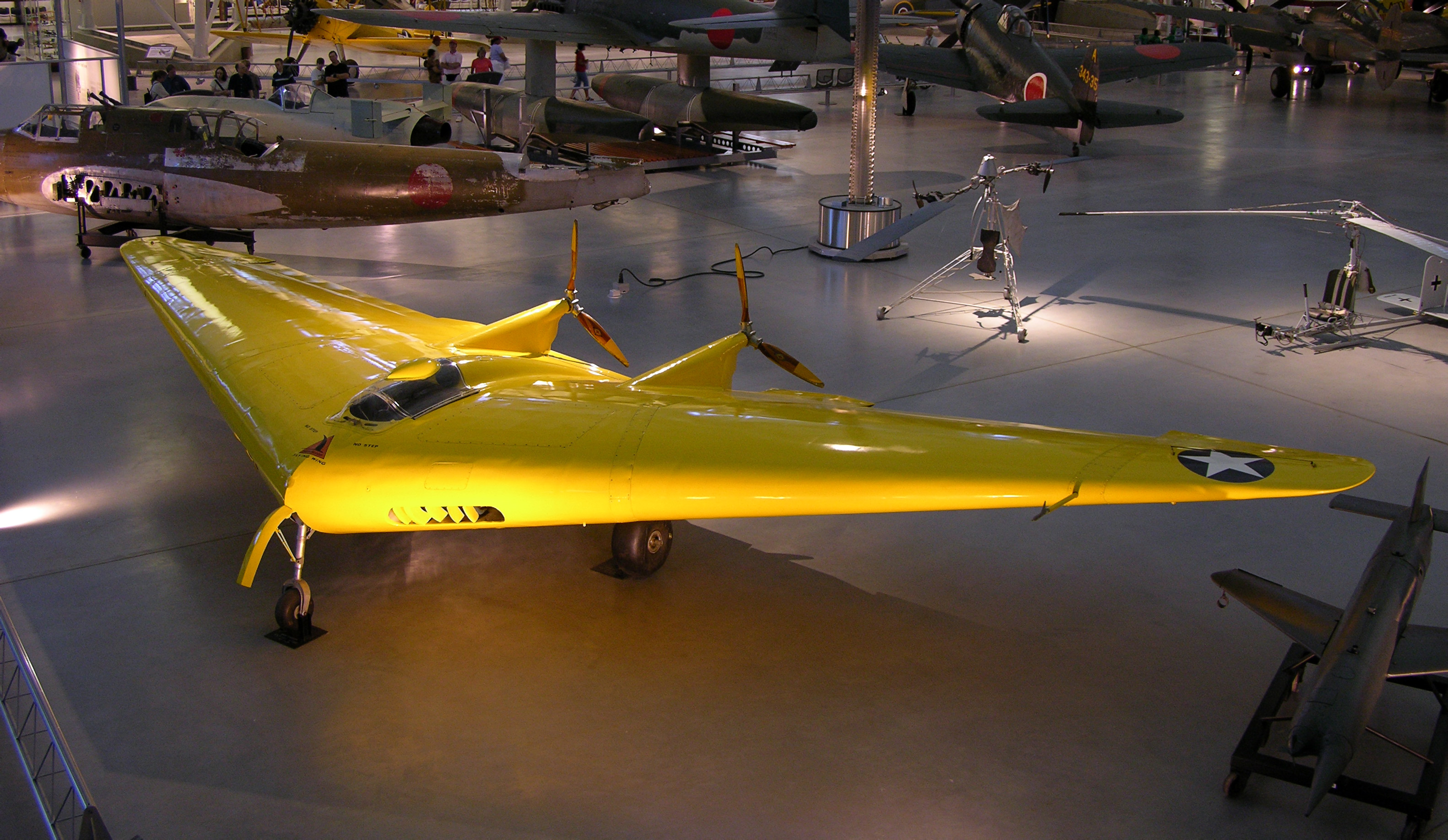
The Northrop N-1M on display at the National Air and Space Museum's Steven F. Udvar-Hazy Center

A flying wing is an aeroplane that has no definite fuselage or tailplane, with its crew, payload, fuel, and equipment housed inside the main wing structure. A flying wing may have various small protuberances such as pods, nacelles, blisters, booms, or vertical stabilizers.

A clean flying wing is sometimes presented as theoretically the most aerodynamically efficient (lowest drag) design configuration for a fixed wing aircraft. It also would offer high structural efficiency for a given wing depth, leading to light weight and high fuel efficiency.

Because it lacks conventional stabilizing surfaces and the associated control surfaces, in its purest form the flying wing suffers from the inherent disadvantages of being unstable and difficult to control. These compromises are difficult to reconcile, and efforts to do so can reduce or even negate the expected advantages of the flying wing design, such as reductions in weight and drag. Moreover, solutions may produce a final design that is still too unsafe for certain uses, such as commercial aviation.

Further difficulties arise from the problem of fitting the pilot, engines, flight equipment, and payload all within the depth of the wing section. Other known problems with the flying wing design relate to pitch and yaw. Pitch issues are discussed in the article on tailless aircraft. The problems of yaw are discussed below.

=== Engineering design ===
A wing that is made deep enough to contain the pilot, engines, fuel, undercarriage and other necessary equipment will have an increased frontal area, when compared with a conventional wing and long-thin fuselage. This can actually result in higher drag and thus lower efficiency than a conventional design. Typically the solution adopted in this case is to keep the wing reasonably thin, and the aircraft is then fitted with an assortment of blisters, pods, nacelles, fins, and so forth to accommodate all the needs of a practical aircraft.

The problem becomes more acute at supersonic speeds, where the drag of a thick wing rises sharply and it is essential for the wing to be made thin. No supersonic flying wing has ever been built.

=== Directional stability ===
For any aircraft to fly without constant correction it must have directional stability in yaw.

Flying wings lack anywhere to attach an efficient vertical stabilizer or fin. Any fin must attach directly on to the rear part of the wing, giving a small moment arm from the aerodynamic centre, which in turn means that the fin is inefficient and to be effective the fin area must be large. Such a large fin has weight and drag penalties, and can negate the advantages of the flying wing. The problem can be minimized by increasing the wing sweepback and placing twin fins outboard near the tips, as for example in a low-aspect-ratio delta wing, but given the corresponding reduction in efficiency many flying wings have gentler sweepback and consequently have, at best, marginal stability.

The aspect ratio of a swept wing as seen in the direction of the airflow depends on the yaw angle relative to the airflow. Yaw increases the aspect ratio of the leading wing and reduces that of the trailing one. With sufficient sweep-back, differential induced drag resulting from the tip vortices and crossflow is sufficient to naturally re-align the aircraft.

A complementary approach uses twist or wash-out, reducing the angle of attack towards the wing tips, together with a swept-back wing planform. The Dunne D.5 incorporated this principle and its designer J. W. Dunne published it in 1913. The wash-out reduces lift at the tips to create a bell-shaped distribution curve across the span, described by Ludwig Prandtl in 1933, and this can be used to optimise weight and drag for a given amount of lift.

Another solution is to angle or crank the wing tip sections downward with significant anhedral, increasing the area at the rear of the aircraft when viewed from the side. When combined with sweepback and washout, it can resolve another problem. With a conventional elliptical lift distribution the downgoing elevon causes increased induced drag that causes the aircraft to yaw out of the turn ("adverse yaw"). Washout angles the net aerodynamic vector (lift plus drag) forwards as the angle of attack reduces and, in the extreme, this can create a net forward thrust. The restoration of outer lift by the elevon creates a slight induced thrust for the rear (outer) section of the wing during the turn. This vector essentially pulls the trailing wing forward to cause "proverse yaw", creating a naturally coordinated turn. The existence of proverse yaw was not proved until NASA flew its Prandtl-D tailless demonstrator.

=== Yaw control ===
In some flying wing designs, any stabilizing fins and associated control rudders would be too far forward to have much effect, thus alternative means for yaw control are sometimes provided.

One solution to the control problem is differential drag: the drag near one wing tip is artificially increased, causing the aircraft to yaw in the direction of that wing. Typical methods include:

- Split ailerons. The top surface moves up while the lower surface moves down. Splitting the aileron on one side induces yaw by creating a differential air brake effect.
- Spoilers. A spoiler surface in the upper wing skin is raised, to disrupt the airflow and increase drag. This effect is generally accompanied by a loss of lift, which must be compensated for either by the pilot or by design features that automatically compensate.
- Spoilerons. An upper surface spoiler that also acts to reduce lift (equivalent to deflecting an aileron upwards), so causing the aircraft to bank in the direction of the turn—the angle of roll causes the wing lift to act in the direction of turn, reducing the amount of drag required to turn the aircraft's longitudinal axis.

A consequence of the differential drag method is that if the aircraft maneuvers frequently then it will frequently create drag. So flying wings are at their best when cruising in still air: in turbulent air or when changing course, the aircraft may be less efficient than a conventional design.

=== Related designs ===
Some related aircraft that are not strictly flying wings have been described as such.

Some types, such as the Northrop Flying Wing (NX-216H), still have a tail stabilizer mounted on tail booms, although they lack a fuselage.

Many hang gliders and microlight aircraft are tailless. Although sometimes referred to as flying wings, these types carry the pilot (and engine where fitted) below the wing structure rather than inside it, and so are not true flying wings.

An aircraft of sharply swept delta planform and deep centre section represents a borderline case between flying wing, blended wing body, and/or lifting body configurations.

== History ==
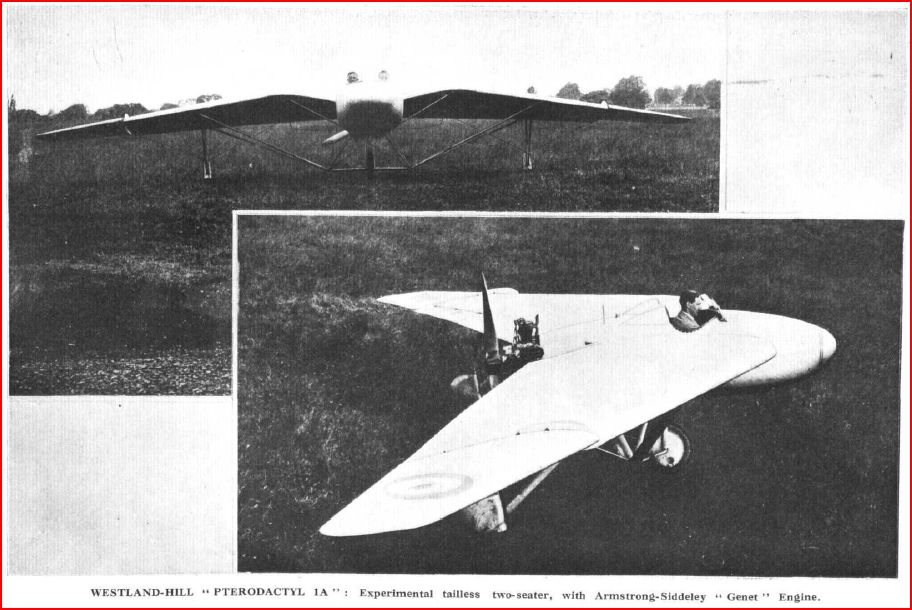
The Westland-Hill Pterodactyl was an early flying wing design.

=== Early research ===
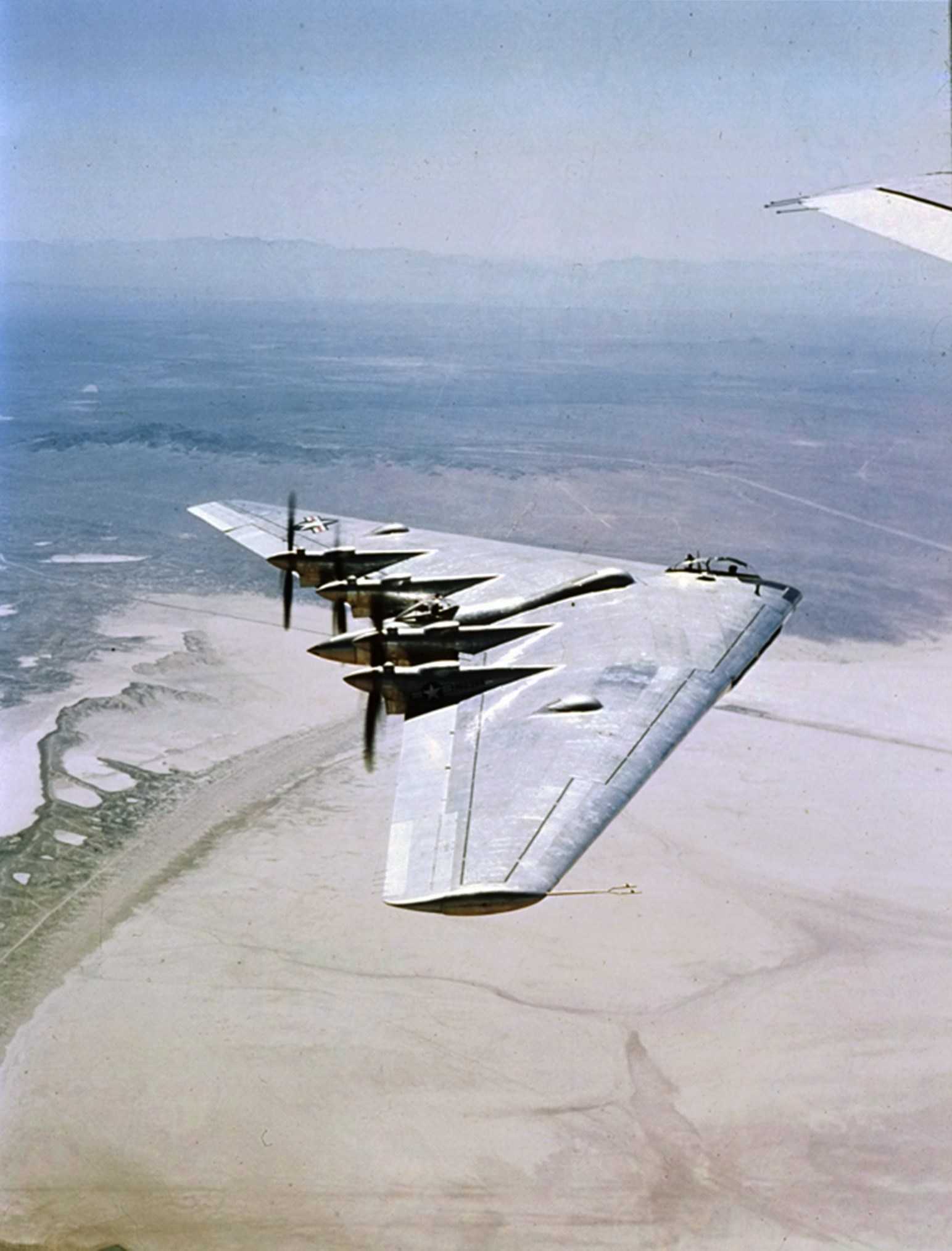
The Northrop YB-35 bomber prototype began its development during World War II.

The concept of the flying wing was born on 16 February 1876 when French engineers Alphonse Pénaud and Paul Gauchot filed a patent for an aero-plane or flying aircraft powered by two propellers and with all the characteristics of a flying wing as we know it today.

Tailless aircraft have been experimented with since the earliest attempts to fly. Britain's J. W. Dunne was an early pioneer, his swept-wing biplane and monoplane designs displayed inherent stability as early as 1910. His work directly influenced several other designers, including G. T. R. Hill, who developed a series of experimental tailless aircraft designs, collectively known as the Westland-Hill Pterodactyls, during the 1920s and early 1930s. Despite attempts to pursue orders from the Aviation Ministry, the Pterodactyl programme was ultimately cancelled during the mid 1930s before any order for the Mk. VI was issued.

Germany's Hugo Junkers patented his own wing-only air transport concept in 1910, seeing it as a natural solution to the problem of building an airliner large enough to carry a reasonable passenger load and enough fuel to cross the Atlantic in regular service. He believed that the flying wing's potentially large internal volume and low drag made it an obvious design for this role. His deep-chord monoplane wing was incorporated in the otherwise conventional Junkers J 1 in December 1915. In 1919 he started work on his "Giant" JG1 design, intended to seat passengers within a thick wing, but two years later the Allied Aeronautical Commission of Control ordered the incomplete JG1 destroyed for exceeding postwar size limits on German aircraft. Junkers conceived futuristic flying wings for up to 1,000 passengers; the nearest this came to realization was in the 1931 Junkers G.38 34-seater Grossflugzeug airliner, which featured a large thick-chord wing providing space for fuel, engines, and two passenger cabins. However, it still required a short fuselage to house the crew and additional passengers.

The Soviet Boris Ivanovich Cheranovsky began testing tailless flying wing gliders in 1924. After the 1920s, Soviet designers such as Cheranovsky worked independently and in secret under Stalin. With significant breakthrough in materials and construction methods, aircraft such as the BICh-3, BICh-14, BICh-7A became possible. Men like Chizhevskij and Antonov also came into the spotlight of the Communist Party by designing aircraft like the tailless BOK-5 (Chizhevskij) and OKA-33 (the first ever built by Antonov) which were designated as "motorized gliders" due to their similarity to popular gliders of the time. The BICh-11, developed by Cheranovsky in 1932, competed with the Horten brothers H1 and Adolf Galland at the Ninth Glider Competitions in 1933, but was not demonstrated in the 1936 summer Olympics in Berlin.

In Germany, Alexander Lippisch worked first on tailless types before progressively moving to flying wings, while the Horten brothers developed a series of flying wing gliders through the 1930s. The H1 glider was flown with partial success in 1933, and the subsequent H2 flown successfully in both glider and powered variants.

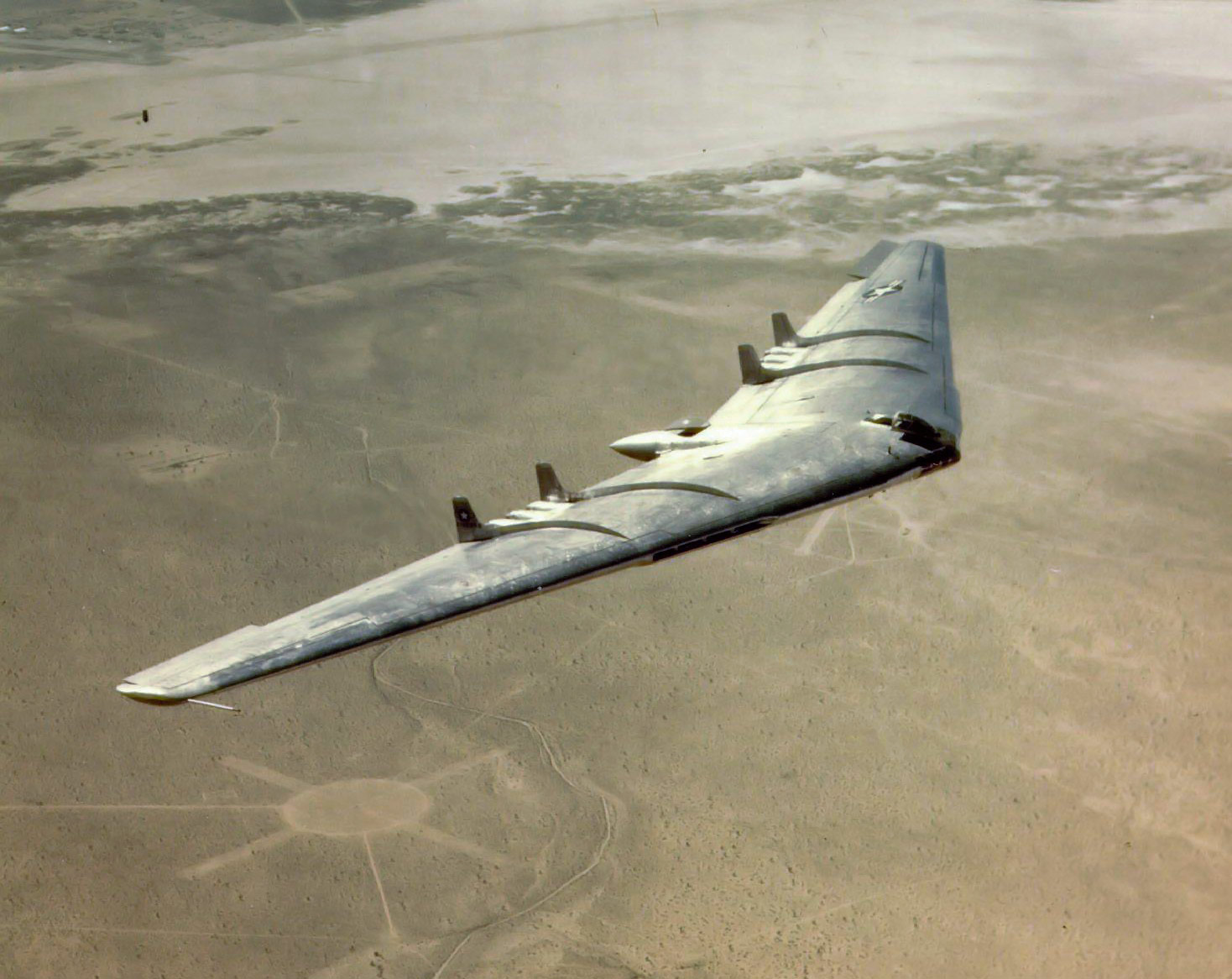
The Northrop YB-49 was the YB-35 bomber converted to jet power.

In the United States, from the 1930s Jack Northrop independently worked on his own designs. The Northrop N-1M, a scale prototype for a long-range bomber, first flew in 1940. In 1941 Northrop was awarded a development contract to build 2 examples of the YB-35 flying wing, a very large 4 engined flying wing with a span of 172'. Development and construction of this aircraft continued throughout World War II.

Other 1930s examples of true flying wings include Frenchman Charles Fauvel's AV3 glider of 1933 and the American Freel Flying Wing glider flown in 1937. featuring a self-stabilizing airfoil on a straight wing.

=== Second World War ===
The German Horten Ho 229 flew during the last days of World War II and was the first flying wing to use a jet engine.

During the Second World War, aerodynamic issues became sufficiently understood for work on a range of production-representative prototypes to commence. In Nazi Germany, the Horten brothers were keen proponents of the flying wing configuration, developing their own designs around it - uniquely for the time using Prandtl's birdlike "bell-shaped lift distribution". One such aircraft they produced was the Horten H.IV glider, which was produced in low numbers between 1941 and 1943. Several other late-war German military designs were based on the flying wing concept, or variations of it, as a proposed solution to extend the range of otherwise very short-range of aircraft powered by early jet engines.

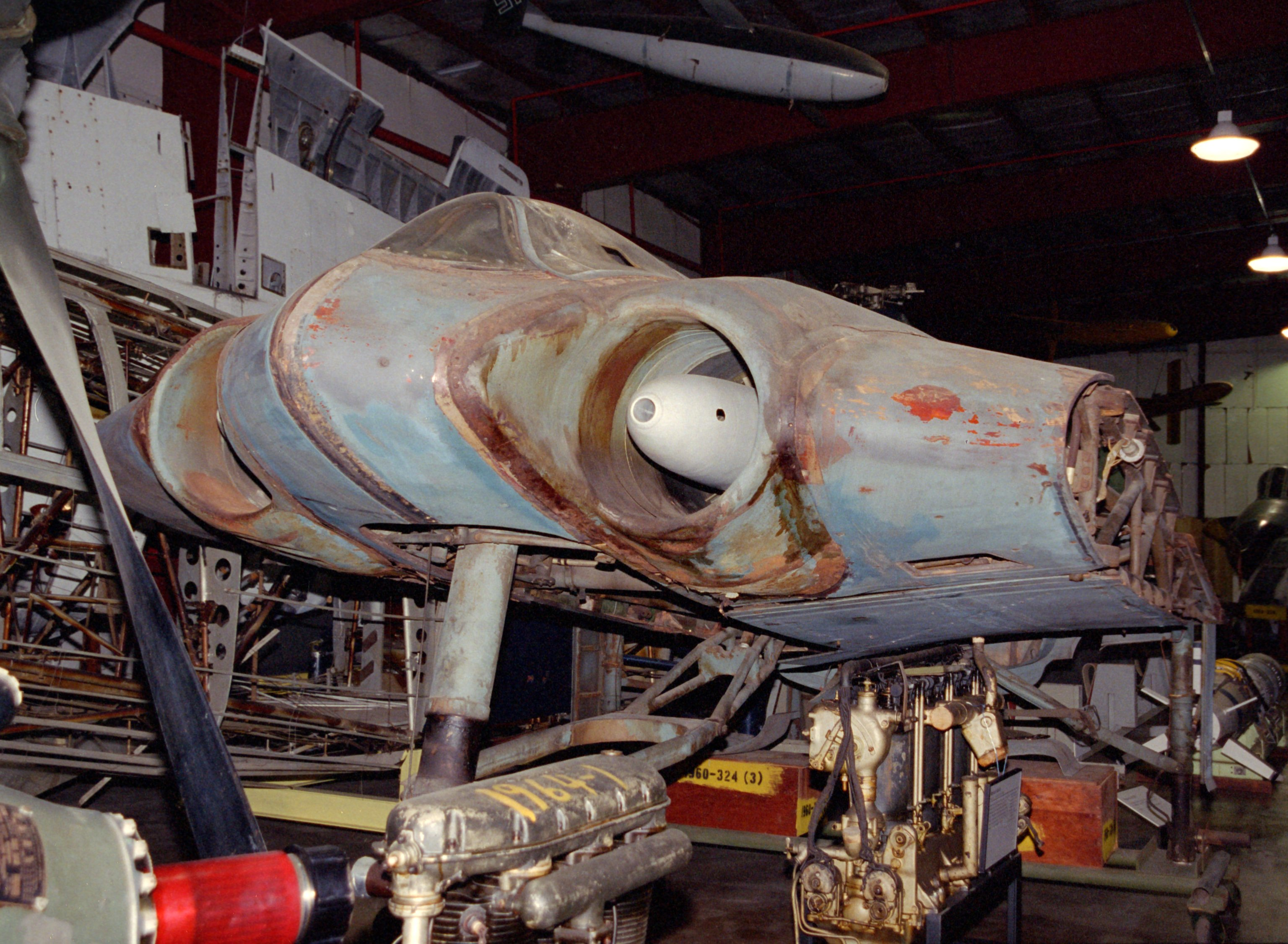
Part of a Horten Ho 229 V3, unrestored as of 2007, at the Smithsonian's Paul Garber Facility

The Horten Ho 229 jet fighter prototype first flew in 1944. It combined a flying wing, or Nurflügel, design with a pair of Junkers Jumo 004 jet engines in its second, or "V2" (V for Versuch) prototype airframe; as such, it was the world's first pure flying wing to be powered by twin jet engines, being first reportedly flown in March 1944. V2 was piloted by Erwin Ziller, who was killed when a flameout in one of its engines led to a crash. Plans were made to produce the type as the Gotha Go 229 during the closing stages of the conflict. Despite intentions to develop the Go 229 and an improved Go P.60 for several roles, including as a night fighter, no Gotha-built Go 229s or P.60s were ever completed. The unflown, nearly completed surviving "V3," or third prototype was captured by American forces and sent back for study; it has ended up in storage at the Smithsonian Institution.

The Allies also made several relevant advances in the field using a conventional elliptical lift distribution with vertical tail surfaces. During December 1942, Northrop flew the N-9M, a one-third scale development aircraft for a proposed long-range bomber; several were produced, all but one were scrapped following the bomber programme's termination. On 9 September 1943, Ellis V. Eichman filed a patent for his Eichman Aerobat. On 8 August 1944, the US Patent Office issued patent number US-D138469-S for the Aerobat. In Britain, the Baynes Bat glider was flown during wartime; it was a one-third scale experimental aircraft intended to test out the configuration for potential conversion of tanks into temporary gliders.

The British Armstrong Whitworth A.W.52G of 1944 was a glider test bed for a proposed large flying wing airliner capable of serving transatlantic routes. The A.W.52G was later followed up by the Armstrong Whitworth A.W.52, an all-metal jet-powered model capable of high speeds for the era; great attention was paid to laminar flow. First flown on 13 November 1947, the A.W.52 yielded disappointing results; the first prototype crashed without loss of life on 30 May 1949, the occasion being the first emergency use of an ejection seat by a British pilot. The second A.W.52 remained flying with the Royal Aircraft Establishment until 1954.

=== Postwar ===
Projects continued to examine the flying wing during the postwar era. The work on the YB-35 long-range bomber begun in 1941, had continued throughout the war with pre-production machines flying in 1946. This was superseded the next year by conversion of the type to jet power as the YB-49 of 1947.

Initially, the design did not offer a great advantage in range compared to slower piston bomber designs, primarily due to the high fuel consumption of the early turbojets, however, it broke new ground in speed for a large aircraft.

On February 9, 1949, it was flown from Edwards Air Force Base in California, to Andrews Air Force Base, near Washington, D.C., for President Harry Truman's air power demonstration. The flight was made in four hours and 20 minutes, setting a transcontinental speed record. The YB-49 presented some minor lateral stability problems that were being rectified by a new autopilot system, when the bomber version was cancelled in favour of the much larger but slower B-36 "Peacemaker". A reconnaissance version continued in development for some time but the aircraft did not enter production.

In the Soviet Union, the BICh-26, became one of the first attempts to produce a supersonic jet flying wing aircraft in 1948; aviation author Bill Gunston referred to the BICh-26 as being ahead of its time. However, the aeroplane was not accepted by the Soviet military and the design died with Cheranovsky.

Several other nations also opted to undertake flying wing projects. Turkey was one such country, the Turk Hava Kurumu Ucak Fabrikasi producing the THK-13 tailless glider during 1948. Multiple British manufacturers also explored the concept at this time. Early proposals for the Avro Vulcan, a nuclear-armed strategic bomber designed by Roy Chadwick, also explored several flying wing arrangements, although the final design had a fuselage.

There has been continual interest in the flying wing for large transport roles for cargo or passengers. Boeing, McDonnell Douglas, and Armstrong Whitworth have undertaken design studies on flying wing airliners; however, no such airliners have yet been built.

Following the arrival of supersonic aircraft during the 1950s, military interest in the flying wing was quickly curtailed, as the concept of adopting a thick wing that accommodated the crew and equipment directly conflicted with the optimal thin wing for supersonic flight.

Interest in flying wings was renewed in the 1980s due to their potentially low radar reflection cross-sections. Stealth technology relies on shapes that reflect radar waves only in certain directions, thus making the aircraft hard to detect unless the radar receiver is at a specific position relative to the aircraft—a position that changes continuously as the aircraft moves. This approach eventually led to the Northrop Grumman B-2 Spirit, a flying wing stealth bomber. In this case, the aerodynamic advantages of the flying wing are not the primary reasons for the design's adoption. However, modern computer-controlled fly-by-wire systems allow for many of the aerodynamic drawbacks of the flying wing to be minimized, making for an efficient and effectively stable long-range bomber.

Due to the practical need for a deep wing, the flying wing concept is mostly adopted for subsonic aircraft. There has been continual interest in using it in the large transport role where the wing is deep enough to hold cargo or passengers. A number of companies, including Boeing, McDonnell Douglas, and Armstrong Whitworth, have undertaken design studies on flying wing airliners to date; however, no such airliners have yet been built as of 2025.

Bi-directional flying wing, top-down view

The bi-directional flying wing is a variable-geometry concept comprising a long-span subsonic wing and a short-span supersonic wing, joined in the form of an unequal cross. Proposed in 2011, the low-speed wing would have a thick, rounded airfoil able to contain the payload and a long span for high efficiency, while the high-speed wing would have a thin, sharp-edged airfoil and a shorter span for low drag at supersonic speed. The craft would take off and land with the low-speed wing across the airflow, then rotate a quarter-turn so that the high-speed wing faces the airflow for supersonic travel. NASA has funded a study of the proposal. The design is claimed to offer low wave drag, high subsonic efficiency and reduced sonic boom.

Since the end of the Cold War, numerous unmanned aerial vehicles (UAVs) featuring the flying wing have been produced. Nations have typically used such platforms for aerial reconnaissance; such UAVs include the Lockheed Martin RQ-170 Sentinel and the Northrop Grumman Tern. Civilian companies have also experimented with UAVs, such as the Facebook Aquila, as atmospheric satellites. Various prototype unmanned combat aerial vehicles (UCAVs) have been produced, including the Dassault nEUROn, the Sukhoi S-70 Okhotnik-B, the DRDO Ghatak, DRDO SWIFT and the BAE Systems Taranis.

== See also ==
- List of flying wings
- Circular wing
- Oblique wing
- Lifting body
- Vincent Burnelli
