= Jack Northrop =

Aircraft industrialist and designer, founder of Northrop Corporation (1895-1981)

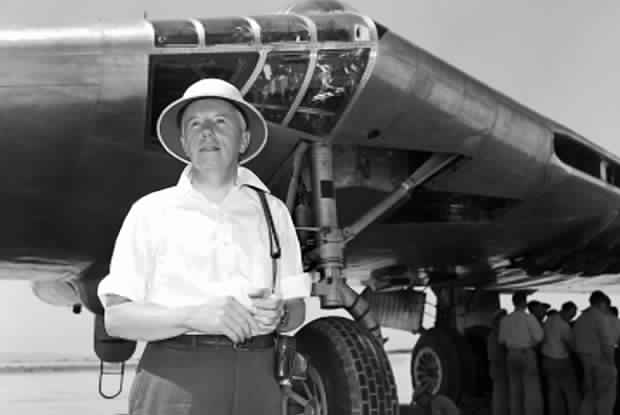
- Northrop with the XB-35, circa 1948
- Born: John Knudsen Northrop; November 10, 1895; Newark, New Jersey, U.S.
- Died: February 18, 1981 (aged 85)
- Occupations: Aeronautics Engineer; Industrial Designer; Businessman
- Spouse: Inez Harmer (1894-1981)

John Knudsen Northrop (November 10, 1895 – February 18, 1981) was an American aircraft industrialist and designer who founded the Northrop Corporation in 1939.

His career began in 1916 as a draftsman for Loughead Aircraft Manufacturing Company (founded 1912). He joined the Douglas Aircraft Company in 1923 and worked on the Douglas World Cruiser, where in time he became a project engineer. In 1927 he joined the Lockheed Corporation, where he was a chief engineer on the Lockheed Vega transport. He left in 1929 to found Avion Corporation, which he sold in 1930. Two years later, he founded the Northrop Corporation. This firm became a subsidiary of Douglas Aircraft in 1939, so he co-founded a second company named Northrop.

== Early life and entering aviation ==
Born in Newark, New Jersey, in 1895, Northrop grew up in Santa Barbara, California. In 1916, Northrop's first job in aviation was in working as a draftsman for the Santa Barbara-based Loughead Aircraft Manufacturing Company. After the outbreak of the First World War, Northrop was drafted into the U.S. Army, where he served in the Army Signal Corps. Northrop served in the military for six months before Loughead successfully petitioned for his return to work in the private sector. In 1923, Northrop joined Douglas Aircraft Company, where he participated in the design of the Douglas Round-the-World-Cruiser and worked up to project engineer.

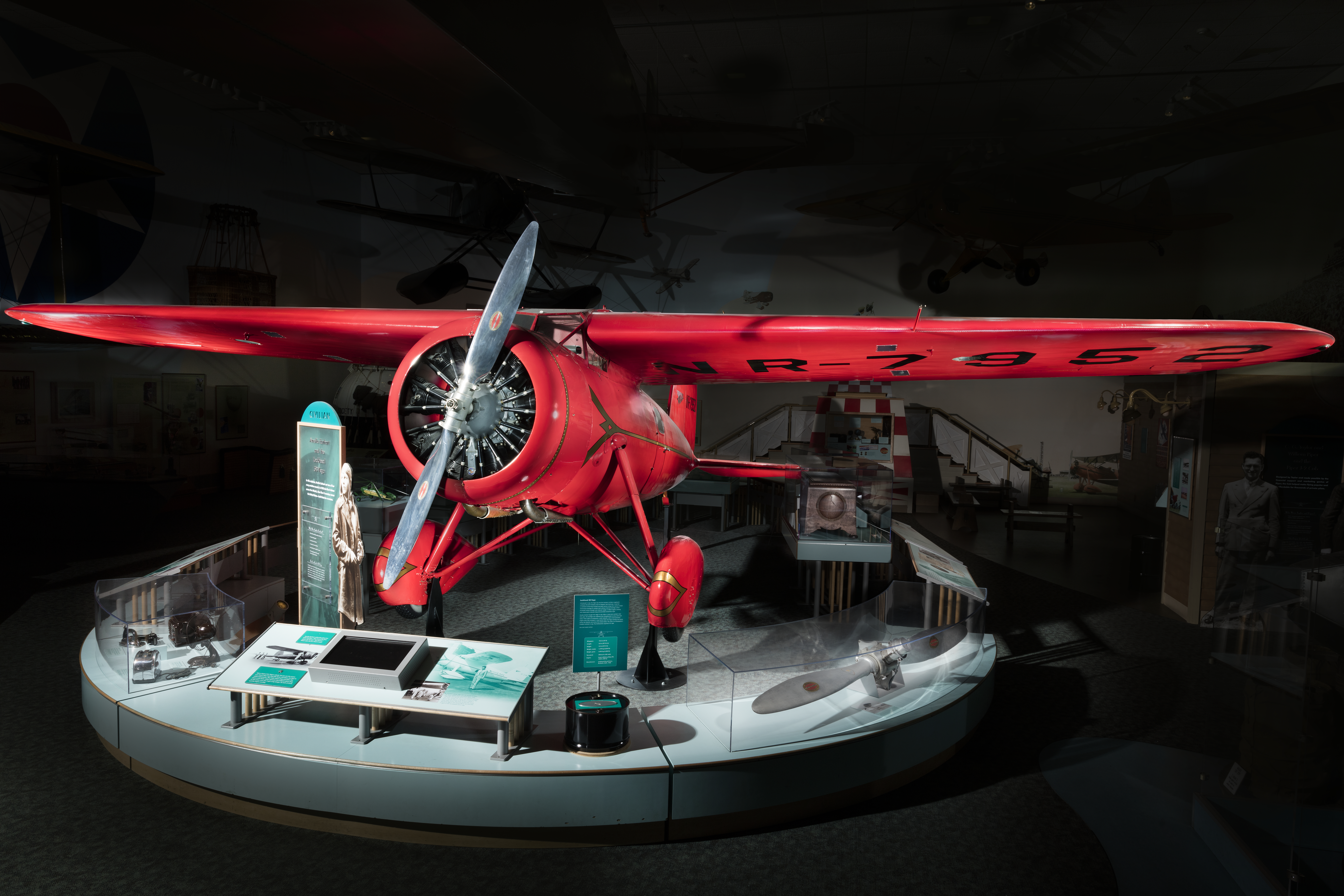
Red Lockheed Vega 5b flown by Amelia Earhart in breaking two world records.

In 1927 he rejoined the Loughead brothers and their newly founded (in 1926) Lockheed Aircraft Company, working as chief engineer on the Lockheed Vega, the civilian transport monoplane with a cantilever wing that produced unusually high performance for that period, and was widely used by such top pilots as Wiley Post, Amelia Earhart, and Hubert Wilkins. In 1929 he produced an all-metal monoplane with an engine within the wing structure. Although this aircraft had booms to attach the tail group, it was in fact the first step toward the flying wing.

== Company founding ==
In 1929, Northrop struck out on his own, founding the Avion Corporation, which he was forced to sell to United Aircraft and Transport Corporation in 1930. In 1932, Northrop, backed by Donald Douglas of Douglas Aircraft, founded another company, the Northrop Corporation in El Segundo, California. This company built two highly successful monoplanes, the Northrop Gamma and Northrop Delta.

By 1939 the Northrop Corporation had become a subsidiary of Douglas Aircraft, so Northrop founded another completely independent company of the same name in Hawthorne, California, a site located by Moye Stephens, one of the co-founders.

== Flying wing and other aircraft ==
While working at this company, Northrop focused on the flying wing design, which he was convinced was the next major step in aircraft design. His first project, a reduced-scale version tested in 1940, ultimately became the giant Northrop XB-35. The Northrop XP-56 Black Bullet, a welded magnesium fighter was one of the more significant of his World War II designs, along with the Northrop P-61 Black Widow, the first American night interceptor, of which more than 700 were constructed.

His inventions continued into the postwar era of jet aircraft, to produce the Northrop F-89 Scorpion all-weather interceptor, the Northrop YB-49 long-range bomber, the Northrop Snark intercontinental missile, and automatic celestial navigation systems. He produced a number of flying wings, including the Northrop N-1M, Northrop N-9M, and Northrop XB-35. His ideas regarding flying wing technology were years ahead of the computer and electronic advances of "fly-by-wire" stability systems which allow inherently unstable aircraft like the B-2 Spirit flying wing to be flown like a conventional aircraft.

The flying wing and the pursuit of low drag high lift designs were Northrop's passion and its failure to be selected as the next generation bomber platform after World War II, and the subsequent dismantling of all prototypes and incomplete YB-49s, were a severe blow to him. He retired at age 57 in 1952 and virtually ended his association with the company for the next 30 years.

== Later years ==
He broke a decades-long silence on the Flying Wing's demise in a 1979 television interview, accusing the Air Force of killing the project to punish him for refusing to merge his company with Consolidated Vultee. He alleged that Air Force Secretary Stuart Symington threatened him by saying, "You’ll be goddamned sorry if you don’t". Symington later left the government to head the very same Consolidated Vultee company Northrop had refused to merge with. Symington called the charge "preposterous and absurd" and told a researcher "There was a tremendous overcapacity in the industry following World War II". He said Northrop came to him, seeking more business to help his struggling company. Symington said, "I may very well have suggested that he merge his company with Convair, who we knew was going to get business." Aviation expert Bud Baker, who studied declassified documents and public records and conducted personal interviews with Symington, Air Force generals and Northrop's chairman, concluded the cancellation "was a sound decision, based on budgetary, technical, and strategic realities."

Northrop dabbled in real estate and lost much of his personal fortune. In 1976, with his health failing, he felt compelled to communicate to NASA his belief in the low drag high lift concept inherent in the flying wing. NASA replied that the idea had technological merit, encouraging Northrop that his flying wing concepts had not been completely abandoned. By the late 1970s a variety of illnesses left him unable to walk or speak. Shortly before his death, he was given clearance to see designs and hold a scale model of the Northrop Grumman B-2 Spirit stealth bomber, which shared design features of his XB-35 and YB-49. The B-2, for example, has the same 172-foot wingspan as the jet-powered flying wing, YB-49. Northrop reportedly wrote on a sheet of paper "Now I know why God has kept me alive for 25 years". B-2 project designer John Cashen said, "As he held this model in his shaking hands, it was as if you could see his entire history with the flying wing passing through his mind." He died ten months later.

== Awards and honors ==
In 1947 he received the Spirit of St. Louis Medal from the American Society of Mechanical Engineers for "meritorious service in the advancement of aeronautics." Investiture in the International Aerospace Hall of Fame came in 1972, and in the National Aviation Hall of Fame in 1974. He was posthumously inducted into the National Inventors Hall of Fame in 2003.

Northrop's passion for tailless flight was honored by the naming of a giant tailless pterosaur Quetzalcoatlus northropi.

Hawthorne Municipal Airport is also known as Jack Northrop Field in his honor.

== See also ==
- Northrop University
