= Aviation ministry =

An aviation ministry is a cabinet level department of a government which is concerned with matters of aviation within a particular country's airspace. An aviation ministry may also be involved with a nation's air force, either to a limited degree or in direct command.

For example, India has the Ministry of Civil Aviation of Government of India.

One of the more well known aviation ministries was the aviation ministry of Nazi Germany which formed the Luftwaffe under Hermann Göring. Other nations, for instance the United States, do not have a cabinet or state level department for aviation, but rather civilian or federally sponsored civilian agencies, one of the better known being the Federal Aviation Administration.
