= Wunderwaffe =

Propaganda term for WWII German weapons programmes

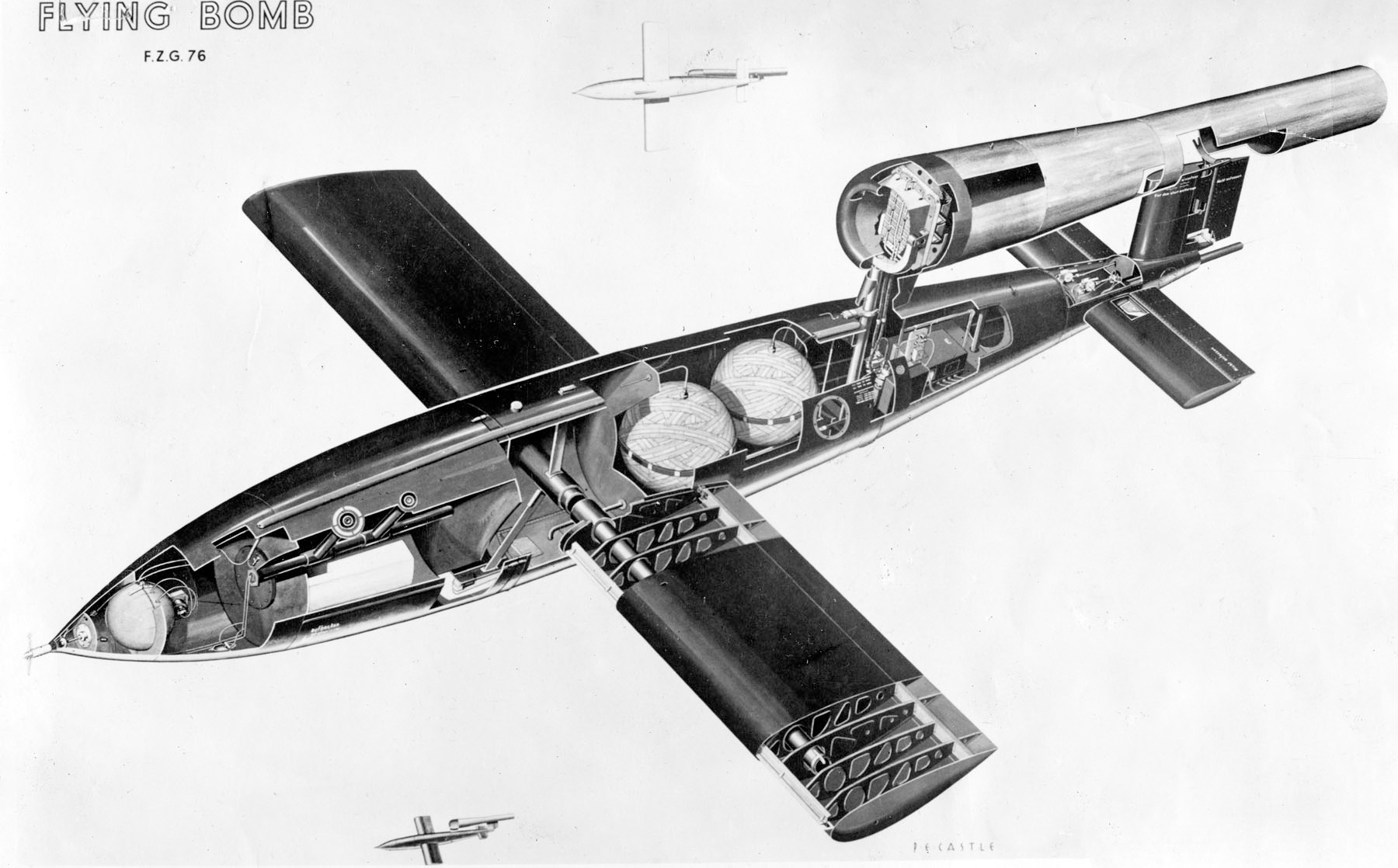
V-1 flying bomb

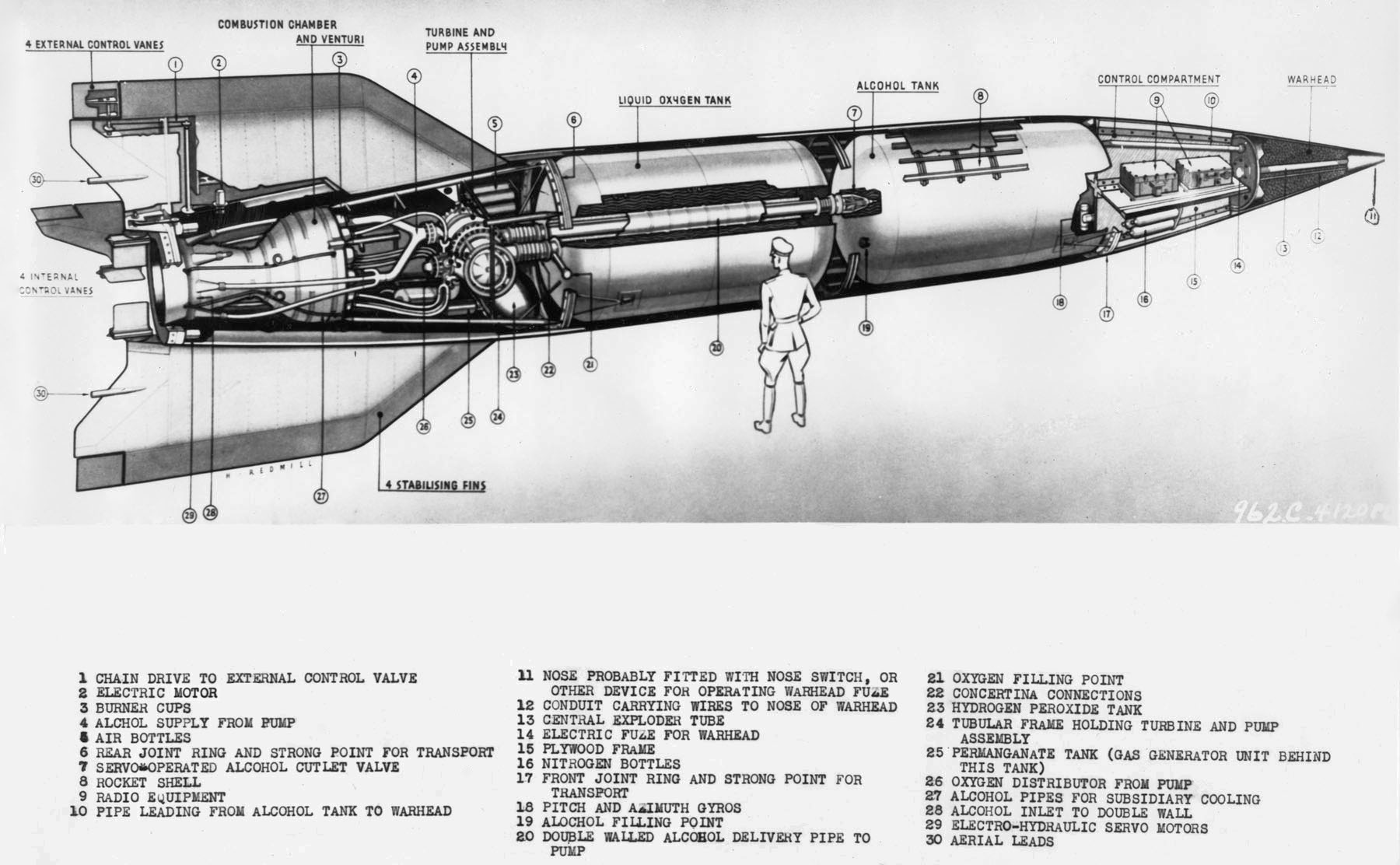
V-2 missile

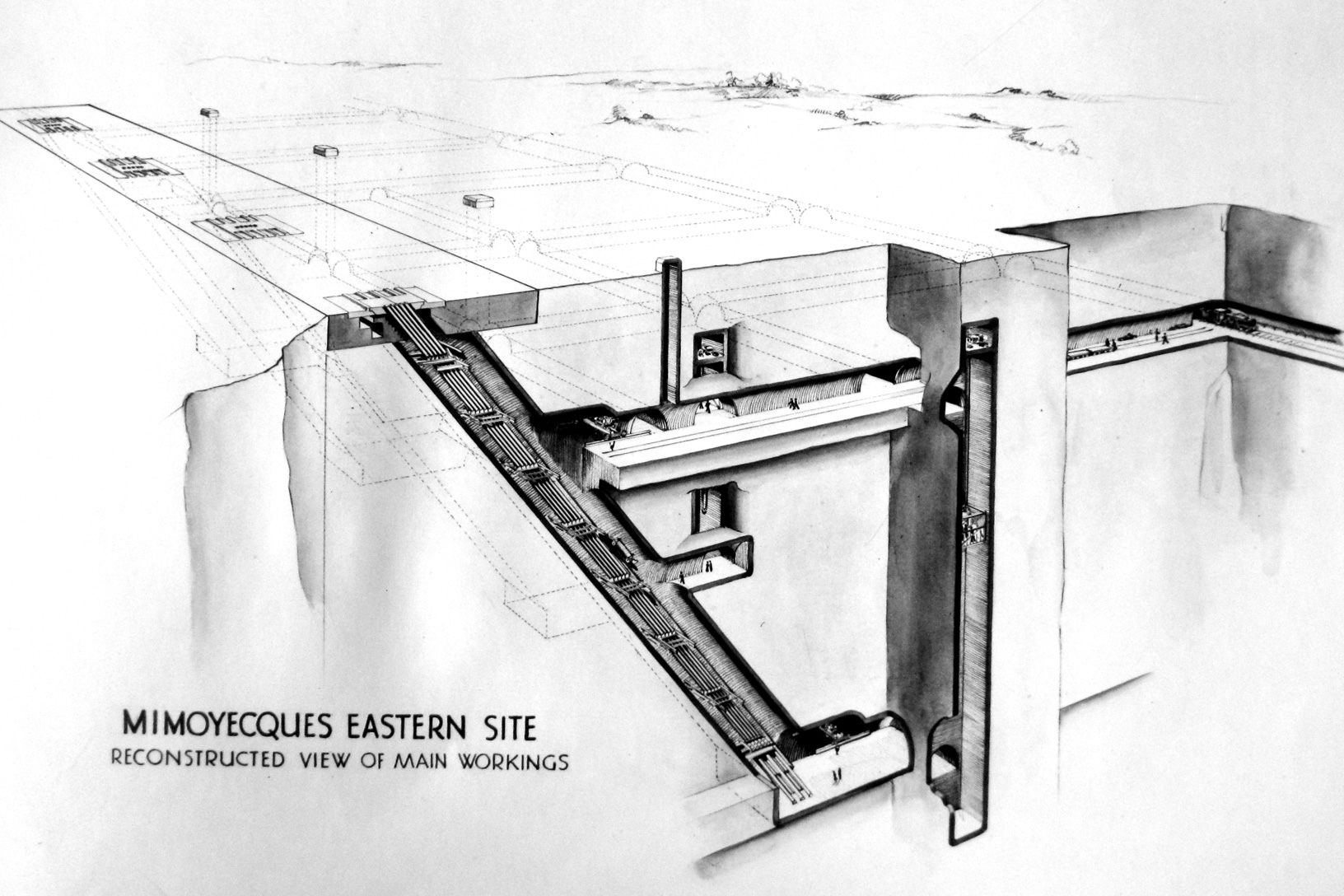
V-3 cannon

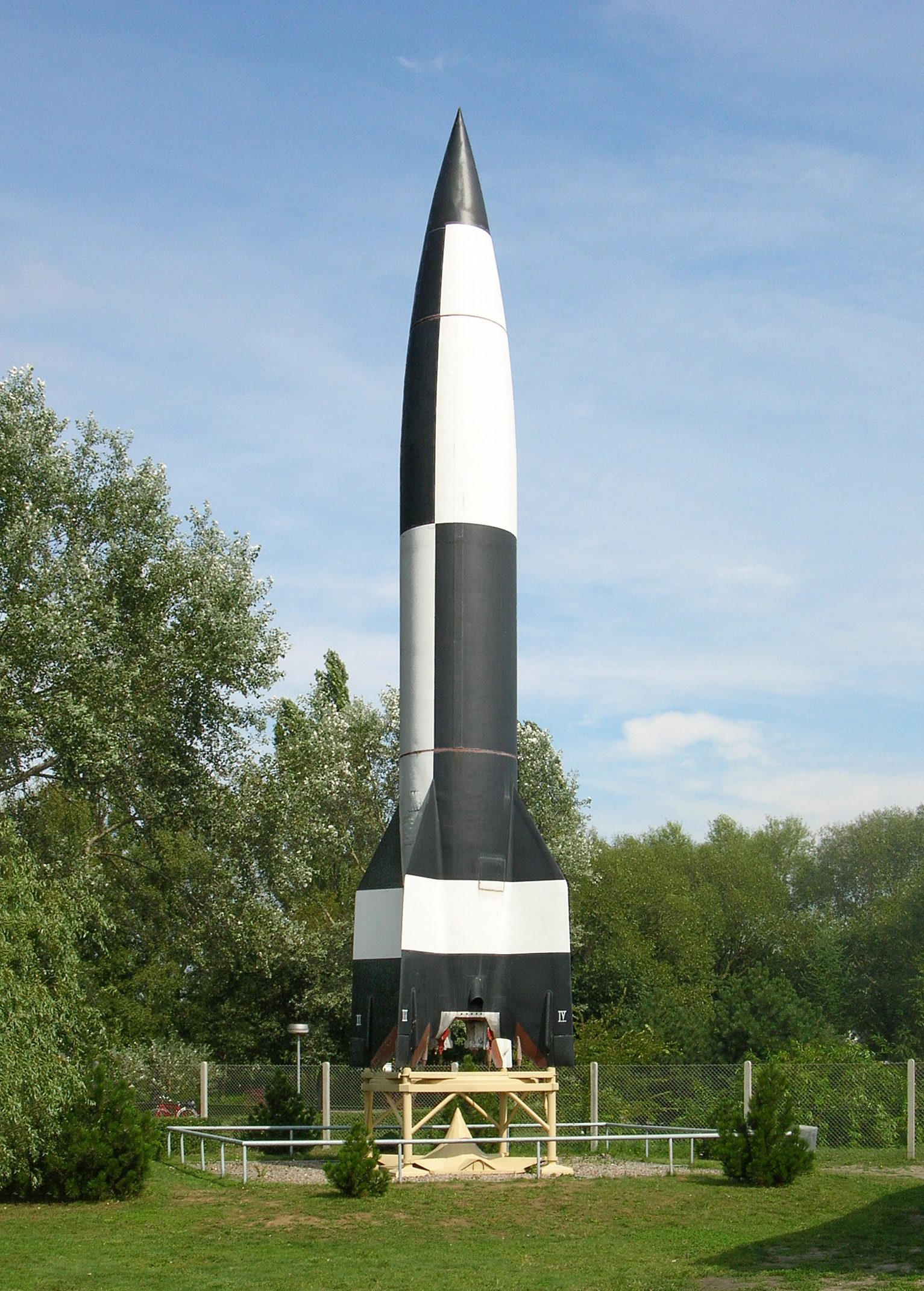
V-2 rocket at Peenemünde Museum

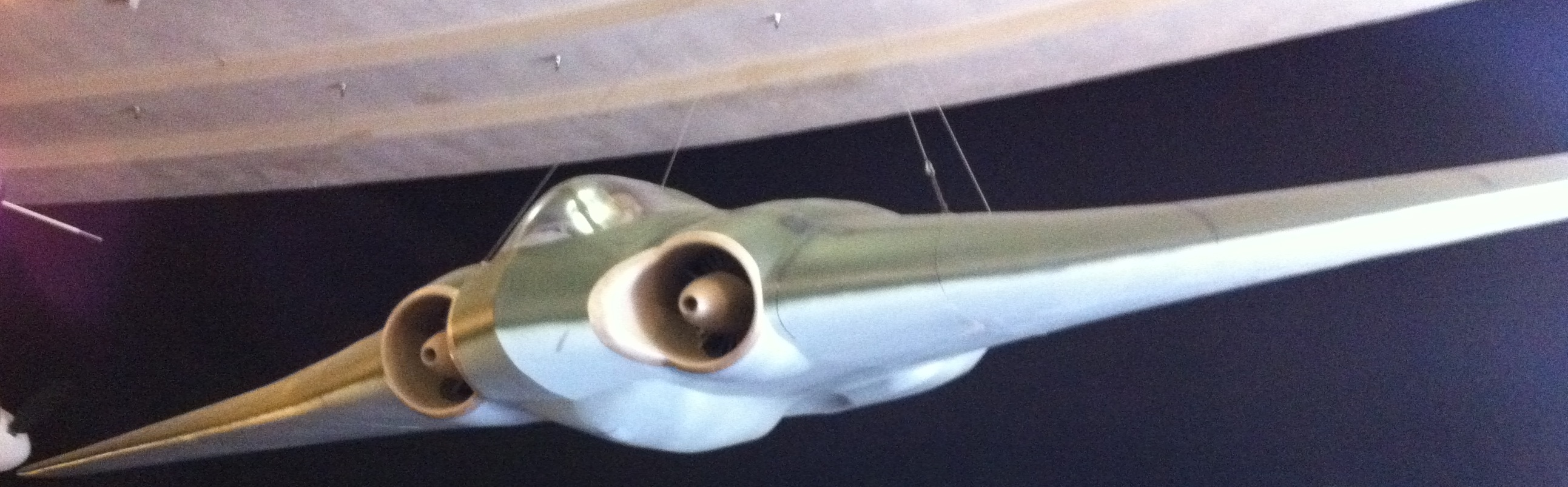
H.IX V3 flying wing reproduction at the San Diego Air and Space Museum

Wunderwaffe (German pronunciation: [ˈvʊndɐˌvafə]) is a German word that literally translates to "wonder-weapon" or "miracle weapon" and was a term assigned during World War II by Nazi Germany's propaganda ministry to some revolutionary "superweapons". However, most of these weapons remained prototypes, which either never reached the combat theater, or if they did, were too late or too few to have a significant military effect. The V-weapons, which were developed earlier and saw considerable deployment, especially against London and Antwerp, trace back to the same pool of armament concepts. In the German language, the term Wunderwaffe now generally refers to a universal solution which solves all problems related to a particular issue, mostly used ironically for its illusionary nature.

As the war situation worsened for Germany from 1942, claims about the development of revolutionary new weapons which could turn the tide became an increasingly prominent part of the propaganda directed at Germans by their government. In reality, the advanced weapons under development generally required lengthy periods of design work and testing, and there was no realistic prospect of the German military being able to field them before the end of the war.

When some advanced designs, such as the Panther tank and Type XXI submarine, were rushed into production, their performance proved disappointing to the German military and leadership due to inadequate pre-production testing or poorly planned construction processes. Historian Michael J. Neufeld has noted that "the net result of all these weapons, deployed or otherwise, was that the Reich wasted a lot of money and technical expertise (and killed a lot of forced and slave laborers) in developing and producing exotic devices that yielded little or no tactical and strategic advantage".

== Naval vessels ==
=== Aircraft carriers ===
- Graf Zeppelin – 33,550 ton aircraft carrier laid down in 1936; never completed.
- Flugzeugträger B – planned sister ship to the Graf Zeppelin; scrapped before launching.
- Flugzeugträger C and D – two additional proposed aircraft carriers of the Graf Zeppelin class.
- I (1942) – planned 56,500 ton aircraft carrier, converted from a transport; cancelled before work started.

=== Battleships ===
- H-class battleship – series of proposals for battleships surpassing both the United States Navy's Montana-class battleships and the Imperial Japanese Navy's Yamato-class battleships in armament, culminating in the H-44, a 140,000 ton battleship with eight 20 inch guns. Two H39-class hulls only laid down; scrapped on slipways.
- Bismarck – German battleship, scuttled in the Atlantic Ocean after being crippled by Royal Navy torpedo bombers and battleships.
- Tirpitz – German battleship, sister ship of the aforementioned Bismarck. Sunk in 1944 by RAF Bomber Command; 32 Avro Lancaster bombers dropped blockbuster and Tallboy bombs in Operation Catechism.

=== U-boats ===
==== Oceangoing U-boats ====
- Rocket U-boat – planned ballistic missile submarine; project abandoned.
- Type XVIII U-boat – U-boat designed to use air-independent propulsion; several were under construction when the war ended.
- Type XXI U-boat "Elektroboot" (Electric boat)– first U-boat designed to operate completely submerged, 118 were started but only 4 were completed.
- Type XXIV U-boat – planned U-boat designed to use air-independent propulsion.
- Type XXVI U-boat – U-boat designed to use air-independent propulsion; several were under construction when the war ended.

==== Littoral U-boats ====
- Type XXII U-boat – U-boat designed to use air-independent propulsion; two were under construction.
- Type XXIII U-boat ("Elektroboot") – U-boat designed for littoral missions; 67 were built.
- Type XXV U-boat – planned all-electric U-boat designed for littoral missions.

==== U-Cruisers ====
- Type XI – U-boat designed to carry the Arado Ar 231 collapsible floatplane and have 128mm turrets; four were laid down but canceled at the outbreak of World War II.

== Armored vehicles ==
=== Anti-aircraft weapons ===
- Flakpanzer IV "Kugelblitz" (Ball Of Lightning) – Panzer IV-based self-propelled anti-aircraft gun; five prototypes built.
- Flakpanzer 341 Coelian – Panther D-Based self-propelled anti-aircraft gun, only a wooden mockup of the turret was built.

=== Anti-tank weapons ===
- Sturer Emil ("Stubborn Emil") – Experimental Panzerjäger style, open-topped tank destroyer armed with a Rheinmetall 12.8 cm K L/61 gun, 2 prototypes built for tests. Sole surviving prototype on display at the Kubinka Tank Museum.
- Elefant (Ferdinand) – heavy tank destroyer, mounting a 8.8 cm Pak 43/2 L/71 gun, 91 units produced.

=== Super-heavy tanks ===
- Landkreuzer P. 1000 "Ratte" (Rat) – planned super-heavy tank, weighing 1000 tonnes and armed with two 280mm cannons, one 128mm anti-tank gun, 8 20mm flak guns and 2 15mm heavy machine guns; cancelled in early 1943.
- Panzer VII "Löwe" (Lion) – planned super-heavy tank, weighing 90 tonnes and armed with a 105mm cannon; cancelled in March 1942 in favor of the Panzer VIII Maus.
- Panzer VIII "Maus" (Mouse) – super-heavy tank, weighing 188 tonnes and armed with two cannons of 128mm and 75mm calibre; five were ordered but only two operable prototypes completed – lone survivor currently on display at the Kubinka Tank Museum.
- Panzerkampfwagen E-100 – planned super-heavy tank (the heaviest of a series of "E-tanks") weighing 140 tonnes and armed with either 128 or 150 mm cannon, one prototype hull nearly completed, the hull was later captured and evaluated by the British before being scrapped in the 1950s.

=== Reconnaissance tanks ===
- Kugelpanzer (ball tank) – prototype spherical reconnaissance/cable-laying tank with a mysterious history. Sent to Japan and captured by the Soviets in 1945. Currently on display at the Kubinka Tank Museum.
- VK 16.02 Leopard – Planned reconnaissance tank. Only mockup of Waffenträger (weapon carrier) was built.

== Gliders ==
- Junkers Ju 322 "Mammut" (Mammoth) – flying wing heavy transport glider, the losing competitor to the winning Me 321 Gigant giant cargo/personnel glider.

== Piston engine aircraft ==
- Blohm & Voss BV 141 – tactical reconnaissance aircraft with unusual asymmetrical design.
- Blohm & Voss BV 238 – super-heavy transport flying boat and bomber, it was the heaviest aircraft ever built at the time of its completion.
- Dornier Do 335 – heavy fighter with the push-pull configuration.
- Focke Rochen – VTOL experimental aircraft project.
- Focke-Achgelis Fa 269 – planned tilt-rotor VTOL fighter.
- Focke-Wulf Ta 152 – high-altitude interceptor.
- Focke-Wulf Ta 400 – planned Amerikabomber candidate with six radial engines and two jet engines with a range of 13,000 km in bomber configuration.
- Heinkel He 111Z – five engined Zwilling (twin)-fuselage aircraft created by combining two He 111s and designed to tow large gliders.
- Heinkel He 274 – high altitude heavy bomber with four in-line engines with a range of 3,440 km, two completed by France after the war.
- Heinkel He 277 – planned, advanced long-range bomber design, designated by RLM by February 1943, inheriting many He 219 prototype design features during its evolution but never built as a complete aircraft, evolved to be an Amerikabomber candidate, to be powered with four BMW 801 radial engines and up to 11,000 km range.
- Junkers Ju 390 – Amerikabomber candidate with six radial engines with a range of 9,700 km, two airworthy prototypes built and flown.
- Junkers Ju 488 – heavy bomber with four radial engines with a range of 3,395 km.
- Messerschmitt Me 264 – Amerikabomber candidate with four inline or radial engines and a range of 15,000 km, three airworthy prototypes built and flown.
- Messerschmitt Me 323 "Gigant" (Giant) – heavy transport with six engines, adapted from the Me 321 giant troop-glider.

== Jets and rocket-propelled aircraft ==
- Arado Ar 234 Blitz – first operational turbojet bomber and reconnaissance aircraft.
- Arado E.555 – planned jet-powered Amerikabomber.
- Arado E.560 – series of tactical bomber projects.
- Arado E.583 – jet-powered night fighter
- Bachem Ba 349 "Natter" (Adder) – rocket-powered vertical take-off interceptor.
- Blohm & Voss P 178 – turbojet dive-bomber.
- DFS 194 – rocket-powered experimental aircraft.
- DFS 228 – rocket-powered high altitude reconnaissance aircraft.
- DFS 346 – rocket-powered research aircraft.
- Fieseler Fi 103R "Reichenberg" – manned version of the V-1 flying bomb.
- Focke-Wulf "Triebflügel" (Powered Wings) – planned tip jet rotorcraft, tailsitter interceptor.
- Focke-Wulf Ta 183 "Huckebein" – planned swept wing turbojet fighter.
- Focke-Wulf Ta 283 – planned swept wing ramjet and rocket-powered fighter.
- Heinkel He 162 Spatz – Winner of the Volksjäger (People's Fighter) design competition for a single engined turbojet fighter.
- Heinkel He 280 – first turbojet fighter design, prototypes only.
- Heinkel He 343 – planned four engined jet bomber based on and marginally enlarged from the Arado Ar 234's general design.
- Henschel Hs 132 – planned turbojet dive bomber and interceptor.
- Horten Ho 229 – turbojet flying wing jet fighter/bomber.
- Horten H.XVIII – planned flying wing jet bomber based on the Horten Ho 229.
- Junkers EF 128 – planned turbojet fighter.
- Junkers EF 132 – planned turbojet bomber.
- Junkers Ju 287 – forward-swept wing turbojet bomber.
- Lippisch P.13a – planned supersonic ramjet delta wing interceptor.
- Lippisch P.13b – planned ramjet delta wing interceptor developed from the Lippisch P.13a.
- Messerschmitt Bf 109TL – turbojet fighter designed as an alternate/back-up for the Me 262.
- Messerschmitt Me 163 "Komet" (Comet)– first and only operational rocket-powered fighter.
- Messerschmitt Me 262 "Schwalbe" (Swallow)– first operational turbojet fighter/bomber.
- Messerschmitt Me 263– rocket-powered fighter developed from the Me 163.
- Messerschmitt P.1101– variable-sweep wing turbojet fighter.
- Messerschmitt P.1106– jet fighter based on the Messerschmitt Me P.1101.
- Škoda-Kauba P14– ramjet-powered emergency fighter.
- Sombold So 344– rocket-powered plane with a detachable explosive nose.
- Silbervogel (Silverbird) – planned sub-orbital antipodal bomber.
- Zeppelin Fliegende Panzerfaust– rocket-powered very-short-range interceptor.
- Zeppelin Rammer– rocket-powered ramming interceptor.

== Helicopters ==
- Flettner Fl 184– night reconnaissance and anti-submarine autogyro.
- Flettner Fl 185 – experimental helicopter.
- Flettner Fl 265 – experimental helicopter, the world's earliest known airworthy synchropter.
- Flettner Fl 282 "Kolibri" (Hummingbird)– reconnaissance "synchropter" helicopter.
- Focke-Achgelis Fa 223 "Drache" (Dragon) – anti-submarine, search and rescue, reconnaissance, and freight helicopter, based on the prewar Fw 61.

== Bombs and explosives ==
- German nuclear weapons program
- Fritz X, a guided anti-ship glide bomb, the world's first precision guided weapon ever deployed in combat.

== Artillery ==
- Karl-Gerät, the largest calibre (up to 60 cm), self-propelled mortar ever deployed – seven examples built, six seeing combat 1941–45.
- Schwerer Gustav (Heavy Gustav) – 800mm railway gun, the largest artillery piece ever used in warfare.
- V-3 cannon "Hochdruckpumpe" – "High Pressure Pump", a large-calibre gun.
- Landkreuzer P. 1500 "Monster"– proposed super-heavy self-propelled gun, weighing 1500 metric tons and armed with the 800mm Schwerer Gustav/Dora gun.
- Wind cannon 'Windkanone"– 35 feet long cannon that projected intense gusts of air at enemy aircraft, but was never proven to be effective.

== Missiles ==
- Aggregat series
  - A1– first German liquid-propellant experimental rocket.
  - A2 – experimental rocket, gyroscopically stabilized.
  - A3 – experimental rocket with an inertial guidance system.
  - A4/V-2– first ballistic missile and the first human-made object to achieve sub-orbital spaceflight.
    - Projekt Schwimmweste "Project Life Jacket"– planned submarine-launched ballistic missile.
    - A4b/A9 – winged, long-range version of the A4, first winged rocket to break the sound barrier.
  - A5 – experimental reusable rocket.
  - A6 – planned version of the A5 with different propellants; may have also been a proposal for a manned reconnaissance version of the A4b/A9.
  - A7 – winged rocket, never completed.
  - A8 – proposed stretched version of the A4 to use storable propellants.
  - A9/A10 Amerika Rakete– planned intermediate-range ballistic missile to be used to strike the eastern United States.
  - A11 Japan Rakete – proposed three-stage rocket.
  - A12 – planned four-stage orbital launch rocket, capable of putting 10 metric tons into low Earth orbit.
- Fieseler Fi 103R Reichenberg– manned "suicide attack" cruise missile.
- Enzian– planned surface-to-air missile with infrared guidance.
- Feuerlilie F-25 "Fire Lilly"– surface-to-air missile.
- Feuerlilie F-55 "Fire Lilly"– two-stage, supersonic surface-to-air missile.
- V-1 flying bomb/Fieseler Fi 103/Vergeltungswaffe 1– first cruise missile.
- Fliegerfaust "Pilot Fist" or "Plane Fist" / Luftfaust "Air Fist"– first man-portable air-defense system (MANPADS) anti-aircraft weapons system.
- Fritz X – unpowered air-launched, MCLOS-guided anti-ship missile using the FuG 203/230 Kehl-Straßurg control system, the pioneering wartime example of a gravity-type PGM, used from September 1943 through 1944.
- Henschel Hs 117 Schmetterling "Butterfly"– manually guided surface-to-air missile.
- Henschel Hs 117H– manually guided air-to-air missile.
- Henschel Hs 293– pioneering MCLOS-guided, launch-boosted air-to-ship missile using the Kehl-Straßurg radio link as with the Fritz X, used in combat from 1943 to 1944.
- Henschel Hs 294 – MCLOS-guided air-to-ship missile/torpedo.
- Henschel Hs 298 – air-to-air missile.
- R4M Orkan "Hurricane" – unguided air-to-air rocket.
- Rheinbote "Rhine Messenger"– first short-range ballistic missile.
- Rheintochter "Rhinedaughter"– manually guided surface-to-air missile.
- Ruhrstahl X-4– wire-guided liquid-fueled air-to-air missile intended to be usable with the Ta 183.
- Taifun "Typhoon"– planned unguided surface-to-air missile.
- Wasserfall Ferngelenkte Flakrakete "Waterfall Remote-Controlled A-A Rocket"– supersonic surface-to-air missile.
- Werfer-Granate 21– heavy-calibre (21 cm/8 inch) unguided air-to-air rocket, in use by the summer of 1943.
- G7es/Zaunkönig T-5 – acoustic homing torpedo used by U-boats.

== Orbital ==
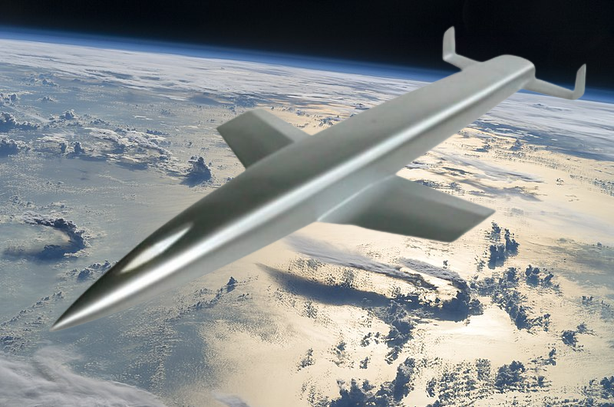
Artistic conception of Silbervogel.

- Silbervogel (Silverbird) — a suborbital rocket bomber, similar to later generations of rocket spacecraft.
- Sonnengewehr (sun-gun)– parabolic mirror in orbit designed to focus sunlight onto specific locations on the Earth's surface.

== Rifles ==
- Jagdfaust – automatically firing airborne anti-bomber recoilless rifle for use on the Me 163.
- Mauser MG 213– 20 mm aircraft mounted revolver cannon.
- Mauser MG 213C– 30 mm aircraft mounted revolver cannon.
- Fallschirmjägergewehr 42 – automatic battle rifle developed specifically for the Fallschirmjäger.
- Sturmgewehr 44– first assault rifle.
  - "Krummlauf"– curved barrel for the StG44 (mp44 or Sturmgewehr).
- Sturmgewehr 45 – prototype.

== Mission equipment ==
- Zielgerät 1229 "Vampir" – active infrared night vision gunsight system for the Sturmgewehr 44.
- FG 1250 Tank Mounted night-vision equipment.

== Speculative ==
- Die Glocke
- Directed-energy weapon
- Nazi UFOs ("Haunebu" saucers)

== Similar developments in Axis powers ==
=== Japan ===
- Japanese nuclear weapons program
- I-400-class submarine (伊四百型潜水艦, I-yon-hyaku-gata sensuikan)– largest submarines of World War II and remained the largest ever built until the construction of ballistic missile submarines in the 1960s.
- Design A150-class battleship (also known as the “Super Yamato-class battleship”)– successor to the Yamato with added features.
- Ki-200 interceptor – Japanese version of the Me 163.
- Kikka – Japanese jet-powered kamikaze aircraft.
- G5N Shinzan– prototype bomber developed as a part of Project Z, the Japanese counterpart of Amerikabomber project.
- G10N Fugaku– planned Japanese ultra-long range bomber comparable in size with the American B-36 Peacemaker developed as a part of Project Z.
- MXY-7 Ohka– rocket-powered kamikaze aircraft.
- O-I super-heavy tank– 150-ton super-heavy tank project with an obscure history.

=== Romania ===
- 75 mm Reșița Model 1943 – anti-tank gun with a muzzle velocity of over 1 km/second which could also elevate enough to double as a field gun, reported to have outperformed its Western, German and Soviet counterparts to become arguably the most versatile gun in its class during World War II (at least 375 produced).
- Self-propelled 75 mm Reșița Model 1943 – 2 prototypes completed and tested (reportedly, this vehicle served as the inspiration for the Hetzer, or as a significant influence in the latter's development).
- IAR 81C fighter aircraft fitted with the Werfer-Granate 21 air-to-air rocket (1 prototype).

=== Hungary ===
- 44M Tas– local attempt to replicate the heavy Panther or the "Tiger 2" tank (2 incomplete prototypes produced, including 1 complete hull).

== See also ==
- Nazi propaganda
- German military technology during World War II
- Emergency Fighter Program
- Russian super weapons
- Military aid to Ukraine during the Russo-Ukrainian war
- Superiority (short story), a science-fiction story by Arthur C. Clarke inspired by the German drive to wonder-weapons.

== Notes ==
=== Works consulted ===
- Merkel, Reiner (2010). Hans Kammler – Manager des Todes. Frankfurt am Main: August von Goethe Literaturverlag. ISBN 978-3-8372-0817-7.
- Tooze, Adam (2007). The Wages of Destruction: The Making and Breaking of the Nazi Economy. London: Penguin. ISBN 978-0141003481.

=== Further reading ===
- Dunning, Brian (January 17, 2012). "Skeptoid #293: Wunderwaffen: Nazi Wonder Weapons". Skeptoid.
