= German military technology during World War II =

German military technology during World War II increased in terms of sophistication, but also cost, mechanical unreliability, and time to manufacture. Nazi Germany put effort into developing weapons; particularly aircraft, rockets, submarines and tanks during the war.

== Land systems ==
=== Infantry weapons ===
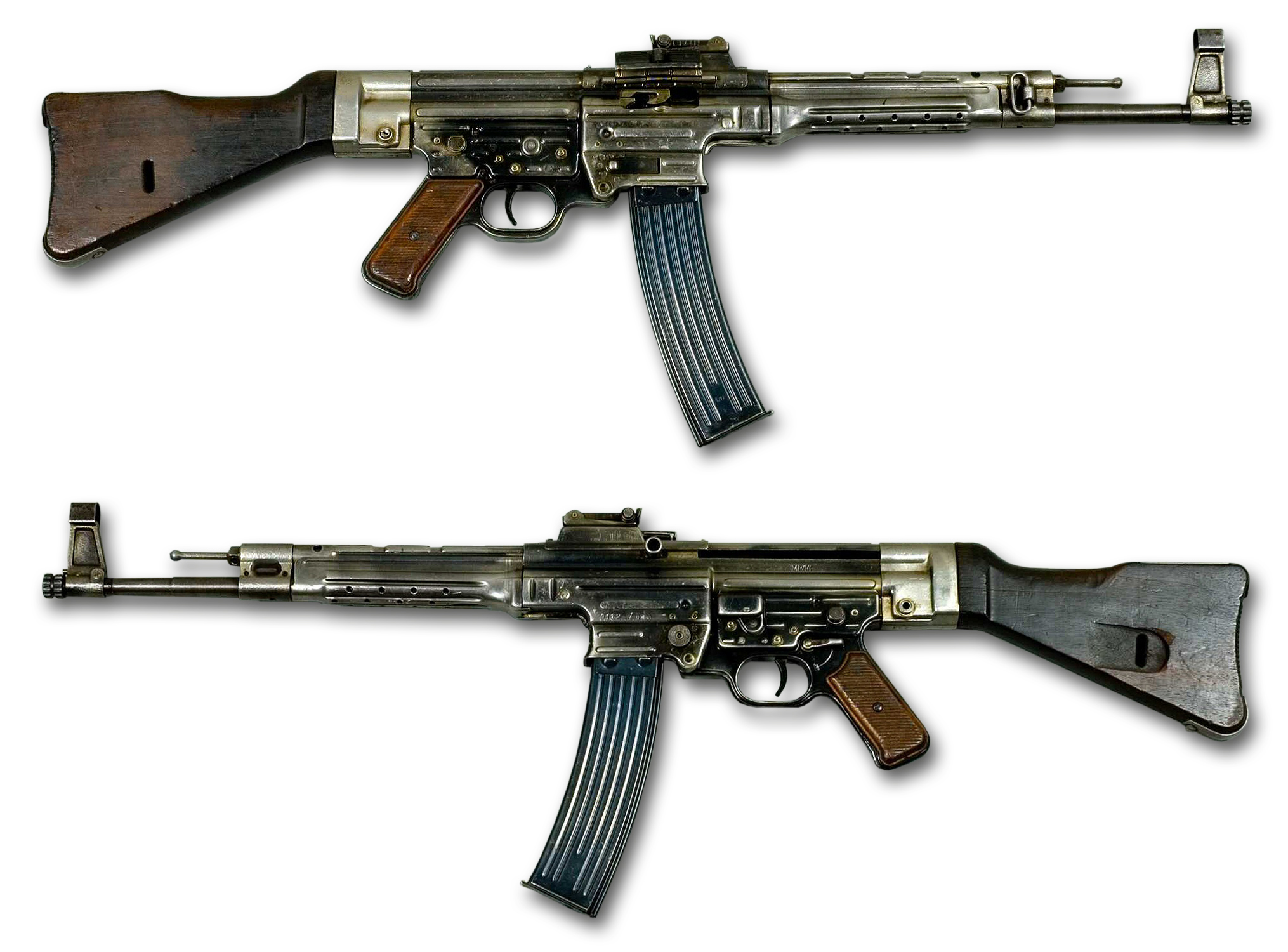
StG 44 from the collections of the Swedish Army Museum.

Germany developed numerous new weapons during the war although it was unable to field many of these weapons in any meaningful number, including the first mass-produced assault rifle in the world.

Beginning in 1940, Germany solicited developmental prototypes for a semi-automatic rifle to replace the commonly used Karabiner 98k, a bolt-action rifle, for better performance in infantry. Two rifle manufacturers, Walther and Mauser submitted competing designs. These would be known as the Gewehr 41, with the entry by Mauser being designated G41M and Walther's being designated G41W.

In 1941, Germany began developing the first mass-produced assault rifle, in what eventually became the Sturmgewehr 44 . However, the rifle did not make a decisive impact on the war due to a variety of factors. Some of the factors which affected the utility of the Sturmgewehr 44 were, the declining state of the German war effort as of early 1943, delays in design and production due to administrative infighting, the allied bombing of German industry, and concerns over the feasibility of introducing a new rifle and ammunition into Germany's strained logistical infrastructure.

The primary German submachine gun of the war was the MP40. This 9×19mm Parabellum open bolt submachine gun was a simplified version of the MP38 making use of stamped steel as opposed to machined components. The MP40 is notable for being an early user of polymers with both the handguard and the pistol grip being made of Margolit (a variation of Bakelite). It is believed over 1,000,000 MP40s were produced by 1944.

Germany is notable also for their development and use of the General purpose machine gun although doctrinally these were known as universal machineguns with the two most notable examples of these being the MG34 and MG42. These air-cooled, open bolt machineguns were originally designed to circumvent the ban on machineguns imposed by the Treaty of Versailles.

=== Armoured vehicles ===
Germany, like the Soviet Union, France, and the United Kingdom; recognized the importance of tanks at the beginning of the war. Heinz Guderian largely helped the development of Panzer forces and the organization of tanks into divisions. Though starting out with training and interim vehicles like the Panzer I and the Panzer II respectively, Germany eventually developed medium tank such as the Panzer III and Panzer IV, both tanks that Heinz Guderian specified for since 11 January 1934. An important feature both of these tanks presented at the time was a three-man turret with a commander, gunner, and loader. Compared to contemporary tanks of the time that used one or two-man turrets, the three-man turrets proved valuable in freeing the commander from other duties in the tank, allowing him to survey the battlefield with ease from his cupola.

== Aircraft ==
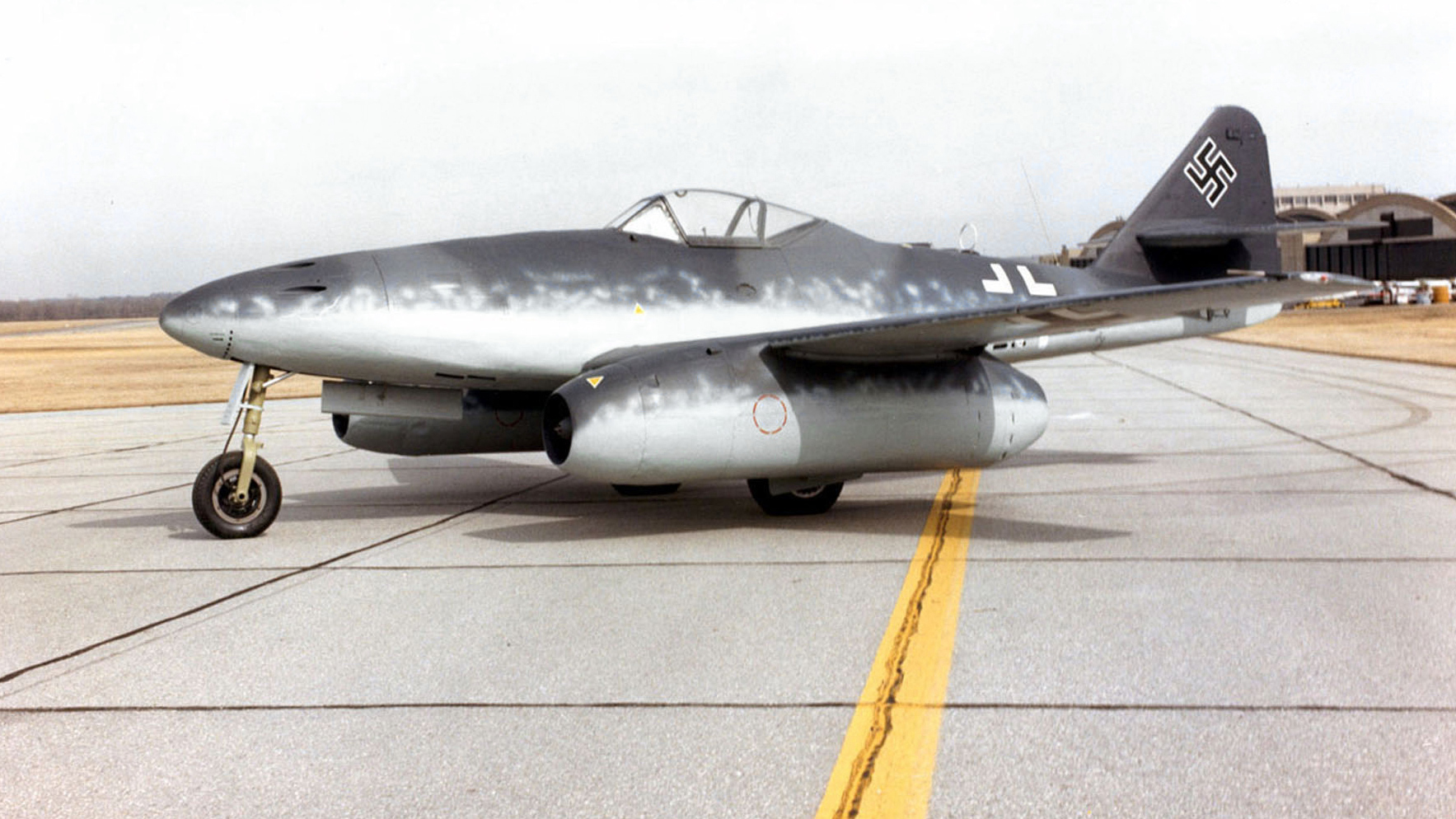
Messerschmitt Me 262 A-1a late production model.

Germany produced the first jet powered plane to see combat, the Messerschmitt Me 262. Entering service one month before the Gloster Meteor in April 1944, it was too late to make an impact against the allied air forces. The Germans also deployed the first jet-powered bomber, the Arado Ar 234 Blitz, which saw service during the final months of the war.

The Germans also experimented with flying wing aircraft, namely the Horten Ho 229 using the same engines as the Me 262. Several prototypes of the aircraft were made with 60 being ordered in total however no examples of the aircraft ever entered service, and what was left of the project was captured by Allied forces.

== Naval systems ==
=== Submarines ===
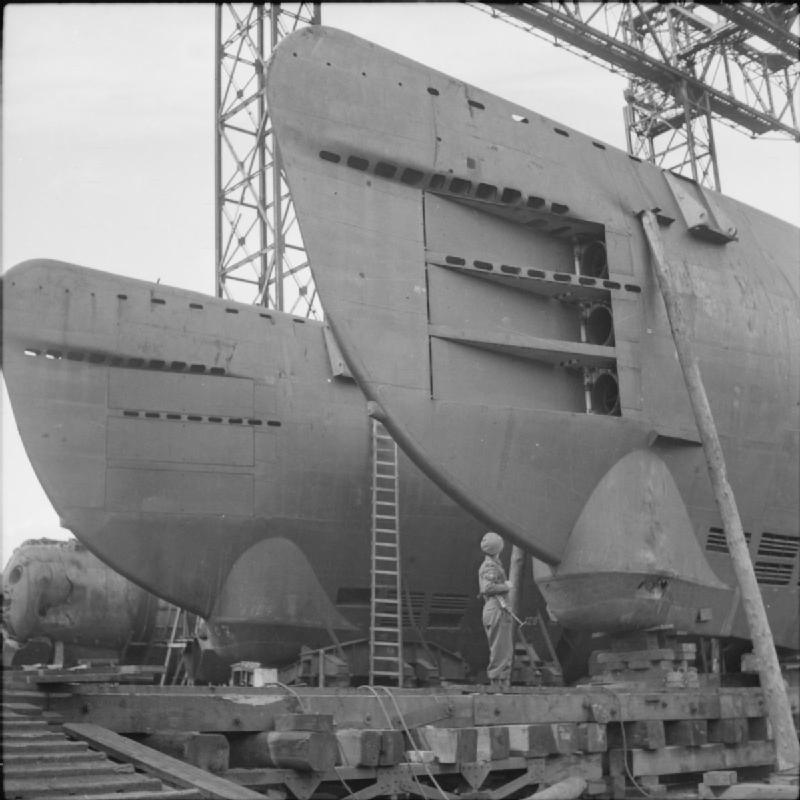
Two Type XXI bow sections, showing the 'balcony' at the bottom.

Germany produced the Type XXI submarine, which were the first submarines designed to operate primarily submerged, rather than spending most of their time as surface ships that could submerge for brief periods as a means of escaping detection. The Type XXI also: was the first U-boat to be equipped with six bow torpedo tubes; had much greater underwater speed by an improved hull design; had power-assisted torpedo reloading; and had better crew accommodations. However the inexperienced factories which constructed the boats were unable to meet quality standards, and most of the produced U-boats were mechanically unreliable.

== Missiles ==
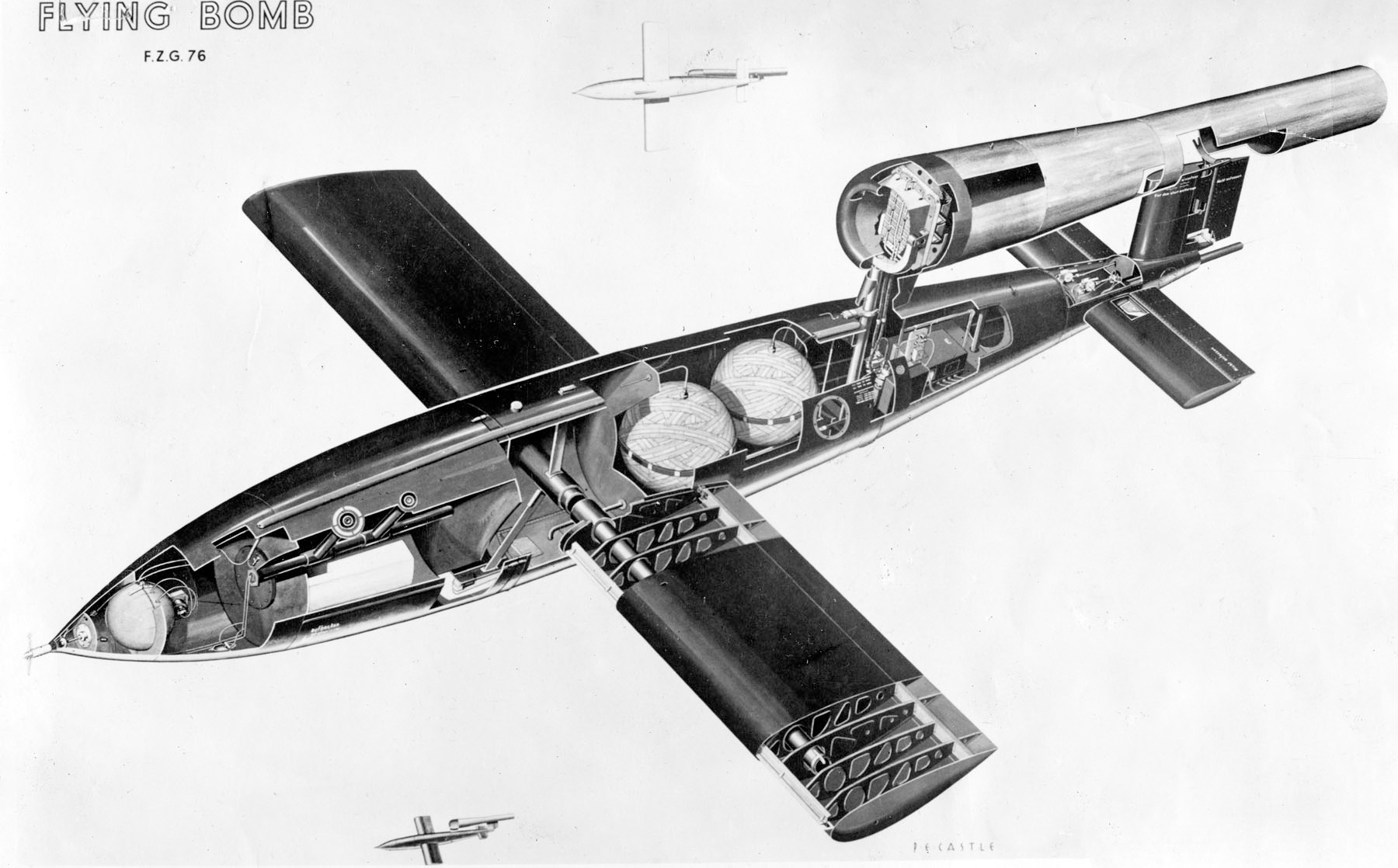
Cutaway drawing of a V-1 showing fuel cells, warhead and other equipment.

Germany also developed a pulsejet powered cruise missile known as the V-1 as well as the first rocket-powered ballistic missiles known as the V-2. Though their impact on the course of the war was minimal, after the war, the Allied powers made efforts to capture personnel involved in these projects for their own weapons programs. In the case of Russia this was known as Operation Osoaviakhim and in the case of the United States it came in the form of Operation Paperclip. However these are by no means the only efforts made by the allies to secure German technical personnel during or after WW2.

Germany also developed the Henschel Hs 293 radio-guided glide bomb, which was the first operational anti-shipping missile, first used unsuccessfully on 25 August 1943 and then with increasing success over the next year, damaging or sinking at least 25 ships. They also developed the Fritz X anti-ship glide bomb at the same time, although it was overall less effective than the Hs 293.

== See also ==
- Wunderwaffe
- American military technology during World War II
