= Wind Cannon =

Experimental German anti-aircraft weapon

Windkanone
- Type: Anti-aircraft artillery
- Place of origin: Nazi Germany

Service history
- In service: 1945
- Used by: Nazi Germany
- Wars: World War II

Production history
- Designer: Mario Zippermayr

Specifications
- Maximum firing range: 200 m (660 ft)

The Wind Cannon (Windkanone) or Whirlwind Cannon (Wirbelwindkanone) was an unsuccessful anti-aircraft cannon developed in Nazi Germany during World War II. It was one of Adolf Hitler's wonder weapons and aimed to utilise powerful blasts of air to disrupt enemy aircraft. This weapon was developed by Mario Zippermayr, but was different from the vortex cannon he also made.

== History ==
During World War II, the idea of novelty anti-aircraft systems was explored by Hitler as the allied bombings of infrastructure were getting more frequent. Military historian Ian V. Hogg described Zippermayr's idea as sounding "like something out of a comic strip"; He also stated that given Germany's desperate situation, ideas that normally "would have been quashed as soon as they appeared" were taken into consideration.

A prototype was produced in Stuttgart and tested in Hillersleben, where engineers concluded that aiming and controlling the projectiles was difficult, leading to further tests using nitrogen dioxide (a brown gas) to study the trajectory of the shots. One cannon was deployed to a bridge crossing the River Elbe in 1945, where it was unsuccessful in disrupting enemy aircraft.

== Design ==
The wind cannon generated "slugs" of compressed air using the combustion of a 2:1 mixture of hydrogen and oxygen obtained from the electrolysis of water inside of a long barrel that was bent at one end. These blasts were intended to rack and strain the frame of enemy aircraft to the point of breaking or at the very least making difficult for pilots to maintain control of their aircraft, causing them to crash. According to Hogg, while Zippermayr's idea was sound in theory, it was better suited for a laboratory scale model than a practical weapon.

The cannon was tested at the Hillersleben gun range, resulting with the cannon breaking a 25 mm (0.98 in) wooden board at a distance up to almost 200 m (660 ft). According to Hogg, the Whirlwind Cannon could break 100 mm (4 in) boards at a distance of 180 m (200 yd). Ultimately the gun failed to produce the desired effect on enemy aircraft and the project was abandoned.
