= P60 (disambiguation) =

The P60 is a statement issued to taxpayers in the United Kingdom.

P60 may also refer to:

== Automobiles ==
- Simca Aronde P60, a French automobile
- Toyota Starlet (P60), a Japanese subcompact car
- Trabant P 60, an East German car

== Aviation ==
- Pottier P.60 Minacro, a French homebuilt biplane
- Curtiss P-60, an American prototype fighter aircraft
- Gotha Go P.60, a German jet-powered flying wing fighter proposal
- Hexadyne P60, an aircraft engine

== Vessels ==
- ARM Punto Morro (P 60), a patrol boat of the Mexican Navy
- HMBS Bahamas (P-60), a patrol vessel of the Royal Bahamas Defence Force

== Other uses ==
- Hop (protein)
- Papyrus 60, a biblical manuscript
- P60, a state road in Latvia
