= Sun gun =

Theoretical orbital weapon

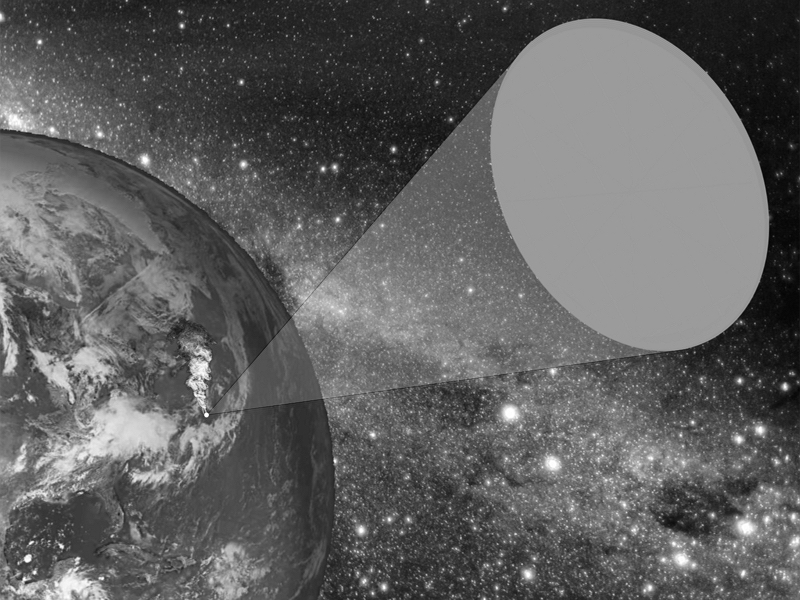
Artistic rendition of a "sun gun"

The sun gun or heliobeam (German: Sonnengewehr) is a theoretical orbital weapon, which makes use of a concave mirror mounted on a satellite, to concentrate sunlight onto a small area at the Earth's surface, destroying targets or killing through heat and burning.

== History ==
In 1929, the German physicist Hermann Oberth developed plans for a space station from which a 100-metre-wide concave mirror could be used to reflect sunlight onto a concentrated point on the earth.

Later, during World War II, a group of German scientists at the German Army Artillery proving grounds at Hillersleben began to expand on Oberth's idea of creating a superweapon that could utilize the sun's energy. This so-called "sun gun" (Sonnengewehr) would be part of a space station 8,200 kilometres (5,100 mi) above Earth. The scientists calculated that a huge reflector, made of metallic sodium and with an area of 9 square kilometres (900 ha; 3.5 mi^{2}), could produce enough focused heat to make an ocean boil or burn a city. After being questioned by American officers, the Germans claimed that the sun gun could be completed within 50 or 100 years. Evidence that Japan was also attempting to develop a death ray was uncovered by American forces.

With the deployment and validation of satellite mega-constellations, their use as a sun gun has also been proposed. Instead of a vast individual mirror, hundreds of low cost reflectors could in theory be synchronized to concentrate solar irradiance and aim it at a target.

== See also ==
- Archimedes' heat ray, a purported device from antiquity which weaponized the sun's rays
- 20 Fenchurch Street, a skyscraper in London whose concave reflecting face generated extremely high temperatures - hot enough to melt plastic - by reflecting the sun's rays
- Concentrated solar power
- Solar furnace
- Space-based solar power
- Space mirror (climate engineering)
- Znamya (satellite) (Not intended for use as a weapon, but similar concept of "mirrors in space" )
