= Gotha Go P.60 =

Late-WWII German flying wing fighter proposal

Go P.60
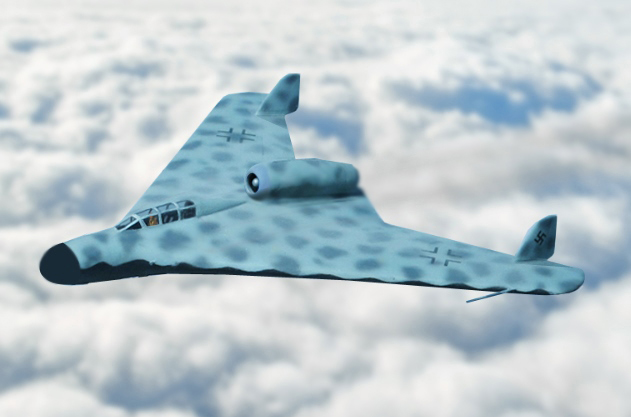
- Artist's impression of the Gotha Go P.60

General information
- Type: Fighter
- National origin: Germany
- Manufacturer: Gothaer Waggonfabrik
- Status: Abandoned
- Primary user: Luftwaffe (intended)

History
- Manufactured: 1945
- Developed from: Horten Ho 229

The Gotha Go P.60 was a jet-powered flying wing fighter proposed during World War II by Gothaer Waggonfabrik (Gotha). The initial concept a two-seat multi-role fighter that was subsequently developed into a three-seat night and all-weather fighter, but no variant was ever built.

== Design and development ==
Gotha had received the production contract for the single-seat Horten Ho 229 flying-wing fighter in June 1944, but numerous design changes were needed to make it suitable for production. Dissatisfied at what he felt were fundamental flaws in the Horten design, Gotha's chief aerodynamicist, Dr. Rudolf Göthert, decided to develop an alternative design to the Ho 229 that incorporated the latest research and was intended to satisfy the requirements of the Luftwaffe High Command (Oberkommando der Luftwaffe). These included a two-man crew, a pressurized cockpit for high-altitude combat, tricycle landing gear, the option to install more powerful turbojet engines and an increase in range over the Horten aircraft.

Although design work probably began in late 1944, the first known design sketches are dated from January 1945 and the company submitted three related designs to the Luftwaffe on 11 March. All of these had two turbojet engines mounted in external nacelles above and below the wing. The aircraft were intended to fulfill the heavy fighter, fighter-bomber, reconnaissance and night-fighter roles. The Go P.60A was a direct competitor to the Ho 229 and could be fitted with either BMW 003 or Heinkel HeS 011 engines. Göthert's proposal made no mention of a rocket-boosted version of the P.60A. The P.60B was a larger version with more powerful engines and greater range. Both of these variants showed the cockpit fully faired into the leading edge of the fuselage, with the pilot and a observer in side-by-side prone positions. They were to be armed with either four 30-millimetre (1.2 in) MK 108 cannon or two MK 103 cannon.

The nose-mounted FuG 240 Berlin radar of the night fighter P.60C model forced a reversion to a more conventional tandem cockpit arrangement with the radar operator behind the pilot. This version's armament was planned as four MK 108 cannon in the wings and an additional pair firing upwards in a Schräge Musik arrangement that was positioned behind the radar operator. Göthert was unaware that the Luftwaffe had revised its requirement to three crewmen on 1 March, but was able to submit a revised design on 21 March with the rear cockpit replaced by an additional fuel tank and additional cockpits added in the wing roots on each side of the pilot. To improve lateral stability of the C model, two small vertical stabilizers were added near the wing tips

In his proposal, Göthert also mentioned that wind tunnel testing was in progress on a version with the engines positioned side-by-side at the rear of the center wing section with a wide air intake protruding from the bottom of the fuselage. One drawing of this version showed the wings with pronounced dihedral and different control surfaces at the wing tips.

== Description ==
All versions of the P.60 were intended to be constructed from steel tubing covered with plywood. The aircraft was built in three sections, two outer wings and the center section. This latter section contained the crew, engines, landing gear, armament. The center section of the fuselage would be built from with wings made from wood. Yaw control would have been provided by a pair of retractable drag rudders near the tip of each wing. Fuel would be carried in a center tank and in the wings. The trailing edges of the wings were fitted with elevons.

The Go P.60C was proposed as a night fighter variant. A radar was to be fitted in a lengthened nose, and three upward-firing MK 108 cannons would have complemented the four cannons of the previous model. Power was to be provided by a pair of either BMW 003 or HeS 011 engines, complemented by a single Walter HWK solid-fueled booster rocket. Work on the Go P.60 was halted by the end of the war in Europe.

== Variants ==
Go P.60A, initial version featuring a prone cockpit and two BMW 003A-1 engines mounted vertically. None built.

- Go P.60A Höhenjäger, proposed high-altitude fighter version.
- Go P.60A Zerstörer, proposed heavy-fighter version.
- Go P.60A Aufklärer, proposed reconnaissance-fighter version.
- Go P.60A/R, proposed version of the Höhenjäger to be fitted with a single Walter HWK 508B rocket engine between the engines.

Go P.60B, simplified version featuring a conventional cockpit and rudders. Prototype halted midway through construction.

Go P.60C, night fighter version with a radar in the nose. None built.

Go P-60.007, variant with a layout similar to the A but with the engines recessed beneath the fuselage and noticeable dihedral. Known only from a drawing, it may be the "fourth" variant mentioned in a March 1945 report by Gôthert.

== Specifications (Go P.60A, as designed) ==
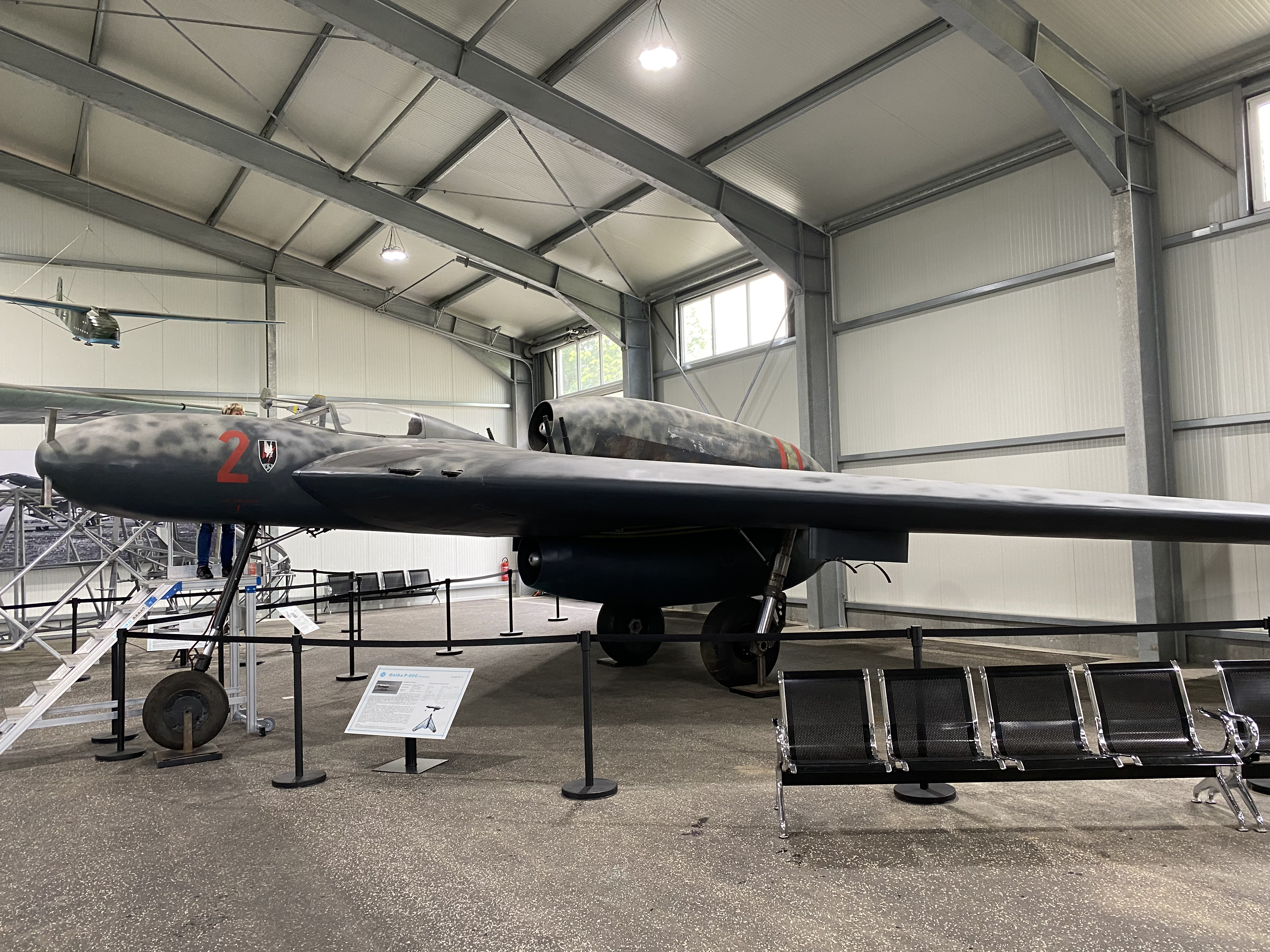
A P.60C replica on display at Rechlin Aviation Museum

Data from Secret Projects: Flying Wings and Tailless Aircraft,Secret Projects of the Luftwaffe: Jet Fighters 1939-1945

General characteristics

- Crew: 2
- Length: 8.82 m (28 ft 11 in)
- Wingspan: 12.2 m (40 ft 1 in)
- Height: 3.5 m (11 ft 6 in)
- Wing area: 46.8 m^{2} (504 sq ft) , 110 m^{2} (1184 ft^{2}) including the fuselage
- Max takeoff weight: 7,450 kg (16,424 lb)
- Fuel capacity: 3,600 L (951 gal)
- Powerplant: 2 × BMW 003A-1 turbojet engines, 7.8 kN (1,760 lbf) thrust each

Performance

- Maximum speed: 915 km/h (569 mph, 494 kn)
- Range: 1,600 km (994 mi, 864 nmi)
- Service ceiling: 12,500 m (41,000 ft)

Armament
4 × 30 mm MK 108 cannon or 2 × 30 mm MK 103 cannon

== See also ==
Aircraft of comparable role, configuration, and era

- Northrop XP-79

Related lists

- List of aircraft of World War II
- List of jet aircraft of World War II
- List of flying wing aircraft

== Bibliography ==
- Griehl, Manfred (1998). Jet Planes of the Third Reich, The Secret Projects. Vol. 1. Monogram Aviation Publications. ISBN 0-914144-36-7.
- Metzmacher, Andreas (2021). Gotha Aircraft 1913-1954: From the London Bomber to the Flying Wing Jet Fighter. Fonthill. ISBN 978-1-78155-706-8.
- Rose, Bill (2010). Secret Projects: Flying Wings and Tailless Aircraft. Midland Publishing. ISBN 978-1-85780-320-4.
- Schick, Walter & Meyer, Ingolf (2005). Luftwaffe Secret Projects: Fighters 1939-1945. Midland Publishing. ISBN 1-85780-052-4.
- Sharp, Dan (2017). Luftwaffe: Secret Wings of the Third Reich: Hitler's 'Wonder Weapon' Tailless Projects. Mortons Media Group. ISBN 978-1-911276-44-9.
- Sharp, Dan (2020). Secret Projects of the Luftwaffe: Jet Fighters 1939-1945. Tempest Books. ISBN 978-1-911658-08-5.
- Shepelev, Andrei & Ottens, Huib (2006). Horten Ho 229: Spirit of Thuringia: The Horten All-wing Jet Fighter. Classic. ISBN 978-1-903223-66-6.
