= FG 1250 =

Fahr- und Zielgerät FG 1250
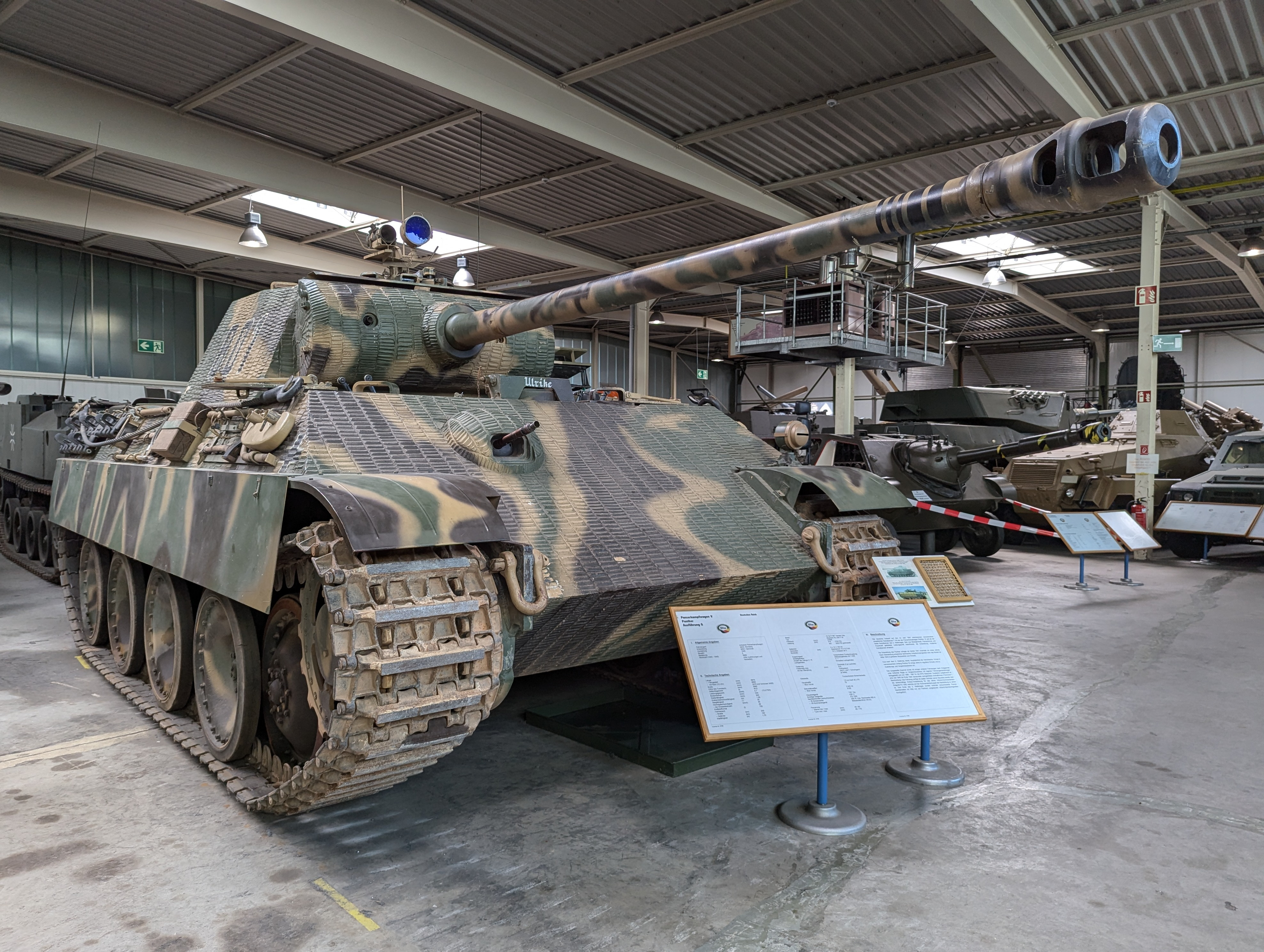
- Panzerkampfwagen V Ausf. G equipped with FG 1250 (or similar night vision device) paired with IR spotlight in the WTS-Koblenz
- Type: night vision device
- Place of origin: Nazi Germany

Service history
- In service: 1944—1945
- Wars: World War II

Production history
- Designer: Ing Gaertner, Carl Zeiss AG / Allgemeine Elektrizitäts-Gesellschaft (AEG)
- Designed: 1941-1944
- Manufacturer: Ernst Leitz GmbH

The FG 1250 or Fahr- und Zielgerät FG 1250 (driving and aiming device FG 1250) was a German active infrared night-vision device mounted on tanks and other armored vehicles. It was developed by Ing Gaertner of the German optics company Carl Zeiss AG beginning in 1941. According to other sources, it was developed by AEG and produced by Ernst Leitz GmbH.

It consisted of a specialized mount, active infrared spotlight and accompanying image converter. In the later stages of World War II the bulky FG 1250 active infrared unit was paired to some MG 42's on Sd.Kfz. 251/1 Falke half-track armored personnel carriers and MG 34's on PzKpfw V Panther tanks.

== See also ==
- Zielgerät 1229
