= List of flying wings =

List of aircraft classified as flying wings

A flying wing is a type of tailless aircraft which has no distinct fuselage. The crew, engines and equipment are housed inside a thick wing, typically showing small nacelles, blisters and other housings.

== List ==
Type	Country	Class	Role	Date	Status	No.	Notes
Armstrong Whitworth A.W.52	UK	Jet	Experimental	1947	Prototype	2	Twin engined.
BAE Systems Taranis	UK	Jet	UAV	2013	Prototype	n/a	
Bell D-35	US	Jet	Fighter	1945	Prototype	n/a	Twin engined.
Boeing Model 907 Spanloader	US	Jet	Transport	1973	Prototype	n/a	
Boeing Phantom Ray	US	Jet	UAV	2011	Prototype	n/a	
Chyeranovskii BICh-3	USSR	Propeller	Experimental	1926	Prototype	1	
Dassault nEUROn	France	Jet	UAV	2012	Prototype	n/a	stealth
Delft Flying-V	Netherlands	Ducted fan	UAV	2020	Experimental	1	Scale model of proposed airliner
Horten Aircraft HX-2	Germany	Propeller	Transport	2019	Experimental	1	Prototype high-efficiency small aircraft
DRDO Ghatak	India	Jet	UCAV	2022	Prototype	1	Scaled down technology demonstrator
Farrar V-1 Flying Wing	US	Glider	Homebuilt	1962	Prototype	1	
Freel Flying Wing	US	Glider	Homebuilt	1937	Prototype	1	School project
Horten H.I	Germany	Glider	Experimental	1933	Prototype	2	
Horten H.II	Germany	Glider	Experimental	1935	Prototype	4	
Horten H.III	Germany	Glider	Experimental	1937	Prototype	19	1 modified as motorglider
Horten H.IV	Germany	Glider		1941	Prototype	4	IV and IVa had a fuselage.
Horten H.Va, b, c	Germany	Propeller	Experimental	1937	Prototype	2	Twin engined
Horten H.VII	Germany	Propeller	Trainer	1942	Prototype	2	Twin engined
Horten Ho 229 (H.IX)	Germany	Jet	Fighter	1944	Prototype	n/a	Two flown
Horten H.XII	Germany	Propeller	Experimental	1944	Project	0	Powered H IVb with laminar flow wing
Horten H.XIV	Germany	Glider	Experimental	1945		n/a	
Horten H.XVIII	Germany	Jet	Bomber	1945	Project	0	
Horten Parabola	Germany	Glider	Experimental	1938	Project	0	Built but not flown.
Kayaba Ku-4	Japan	Propeller	Fighter	1940	Project	0	
Lockheed Martin RQ-170 Sentinel	US	UAV	Reconnaissance	1991	Production	20 ca.	
Kalinin K-12	Russia	Propeller	Bomber	1937	Prototype	1	
McDonnell Douglas A-12 Avenger II	US	Jet	Attack	2007	Project	0	
Northrop B-2 Spirit	US	Jet	Bomber	1989	Production	21	
Northrop Grumman B-21 Raider	US	Jet	Bomber	2023	Project	1	
Northrop N-1M	US	Propeller	Experimental	1940	Prototype	1	
Northrop N-9M	US	Propeller	Experimental	1942	Prototype	4	
Northrop XP-79	US	Jet	Fighter	1945	Prototype	1	
Northrop XB-35 & YB-35	US	Propeller	Bomber	1945	Prototype	n/a	
Northrop YB-49	US	Jet	Bomber	1947	Prototype	3	Converted YB-35.
Northrop Nuclear-Powered Flying Wing	US	Jet	Bomber	1956	Prototype	0	
Northrop Grumman Switchblade	US	Jet	UAV	2008	Project	0	
NRC tailless glider	Canada	Glider	Research	1946	Prototype	1	
Putilov Stal-5	USSR	Propeller	Transport	1933	Project	0	18 passengers, scale model flown 1935.
Saegheh	Iran	Jet	UAV	2018	Production	n/a	
Sky OV	Spain	Jet	Airliner	2023	Experimental	0	Proposed supersonic airliner
Sukhoi S-70 Okhotnik	Russia	Jet	UAV	2019	Prototype	1	stealth
Mikoyan Skat	Russia	Jet	UAV	2005	Prototype	n/a	stealth
Vought V-173	US	Propeller	Experimental	1942	Prototype	1	Circular wing.
Vought XF5U	US	Propeller	Fighter	1947	Project	0	Failed to fly
TAI Anka-3	Turkey	Jet	UCAV	2022	Prototype	1	First prototype flown
Chengdu J-36	China	Jet	Fighter	2024	Prototype	1	Potentially supersonic
Shenyang J-50	China	Jet	Fighter	2024	Prototype	1	Potentially supersonic

== See also ==
- Blended wing body
- Lifting body
- List of tailless aircraft
