= American military technology during World War II =

American military technologies developed during World War II became more advanced and specialized as the war progressed. The technologies produced ranged in complexity from relatively simple items such as small arms and armored vehicles, including tanks, to more complex items such as the atomic bomb. The latter, produced under the secretive Manhattan Project, proved to be an incredibly powerful weapon that revolutionized warfare and was used to end the war. Other technologies, such as the M4 Sherman tank, the M1 Garand and M1 Carbine, and the gas mask, were refinements on previously existing technologies.

== Tanks ==
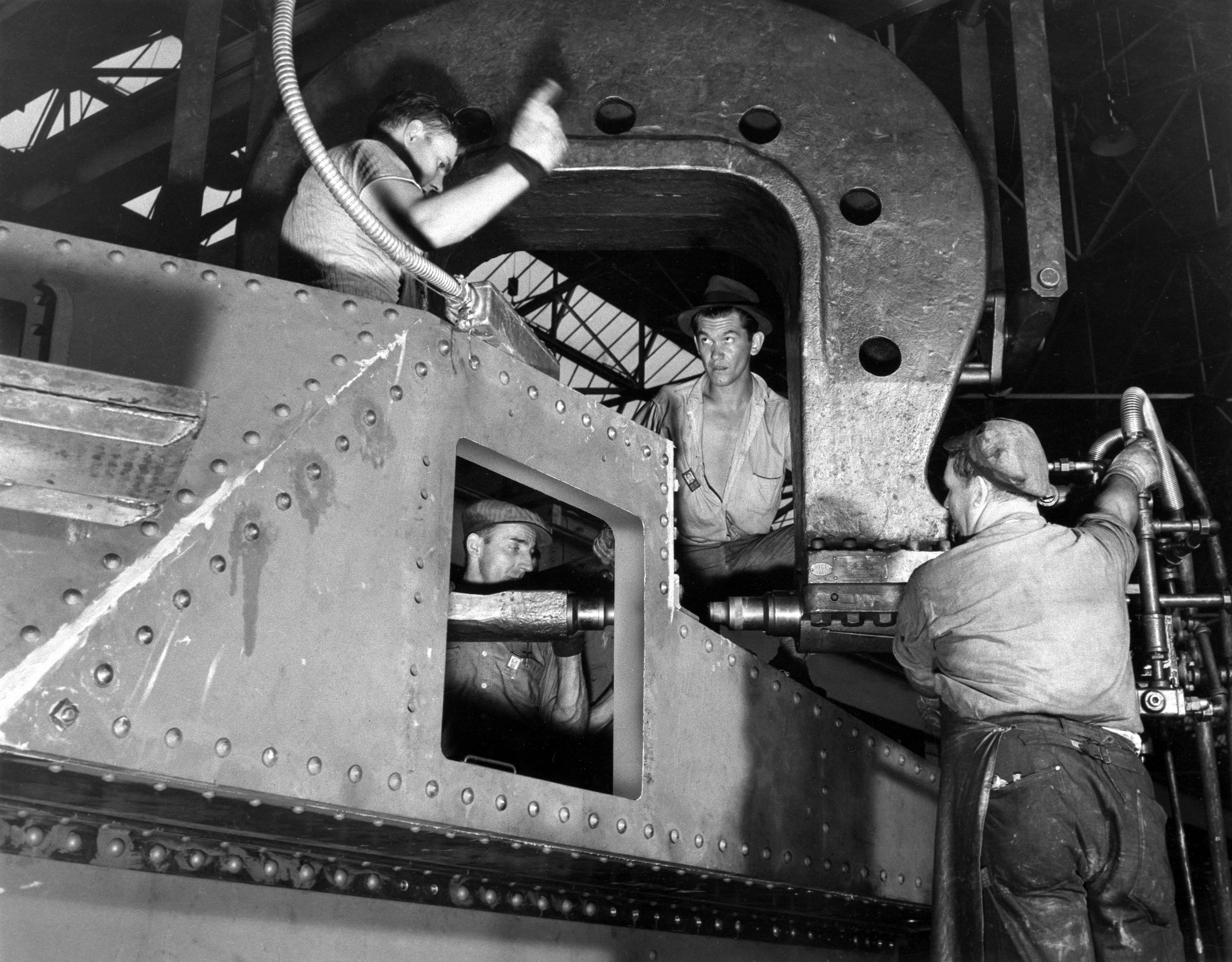
An M3 tank under construction

The M4 Sherman became the standard American military tank in World War II. Due to lack of development before the war leading to inexperience in tank design, the first large scale production of a medium tank was the M3 Lee, built for the US and the British, a compromise design with the main weapon mounted in the hull. It did have a stabilized 37mm gun in the turret, which was effective against antitank guns, able to fire, and hit, even when moving. By contrast, no German tanks had stabilized guns.

The M6 tank was the first of the heavy tanks used during the war. This particular tank series weighed approximately 50 to 80 tons. While there were demand for heavy tanks by some elements within the US Army, opposing views held predominated. Only the M26 heavy tank entered mass production during the war and it only reached Europe in the final months.

As well as the US Army it was used to equip other western Allies serving alongside their own designs. Over 50,000 tanks were produced during the time of the war. Tanks like these were used during combat in mainly North Africa.

== Atomic bomb ==
On 6 and 9 August 1945, an atomic bomb was dropped on the Japanese cities of Hiroshima and Nagasaki instantly killing 120,000 people. Roughly 100,000 more people died of radiation poisoning in the following years. Six days after the dropping of the bomb on Nagasaki, the Japanese surrendered. The Manhattan Project was the leading collaborative scientific effort and the most secretive of the time. At first, several different labs had scientists working on smaller parts of the atom bomb, but they had no idea as to the magnitude of the project. Later, the project, combined with British work on atomic weapons, was moved to Los Alamos, New Mexico, led by renowned physicist J. Robert Oppenheimer

After the use of the bombs, American journalists traveled to the devastated areas and documented the horrors they saw. This raised moral concerns and the necessity of the attack. The motives of President Harry Truman, the United States Army Air Force (USAAF), and the United States Navy came under suspicion, and the USAAF and Navy released statements that it was necessary in order to make Japan surrender rather than undertake an invasion of Japan.

== Small arms ==
There were many small arms variants produced for use by U.S. forces during the war. Under the Lend-Lease Program, other Allied forces also gained access to a plethora of US weaponry. Common small arms used by rifle companies during the war included: the M1 Garand, M1 Carbine, and the .45 caliber pistol. Mortar teams had 60mm mortars and snipers were issued a scoped M1903 Springfield.

The US entered the war with the M1 Garand as its service rifle. However, due to its size and weight, it was not an ideal weapon for some specialist roles such as engineers, tank crew, radio operators etc. So the lighter and smaller M1 Carbine was introduced in mid-1942.

The standard US submachine gun was the Thompson. Designed in 1919 it was a reliable weapon but expensive and not suited to mass production. Although cost of production was reduced, eork on a cheaper, simpler alternative - along the lines of the British Sten or German MP40 - began in 1942. The M3 submachine gun was introduced in 1944, but problems lingered and it never completely replaced the Thompson.

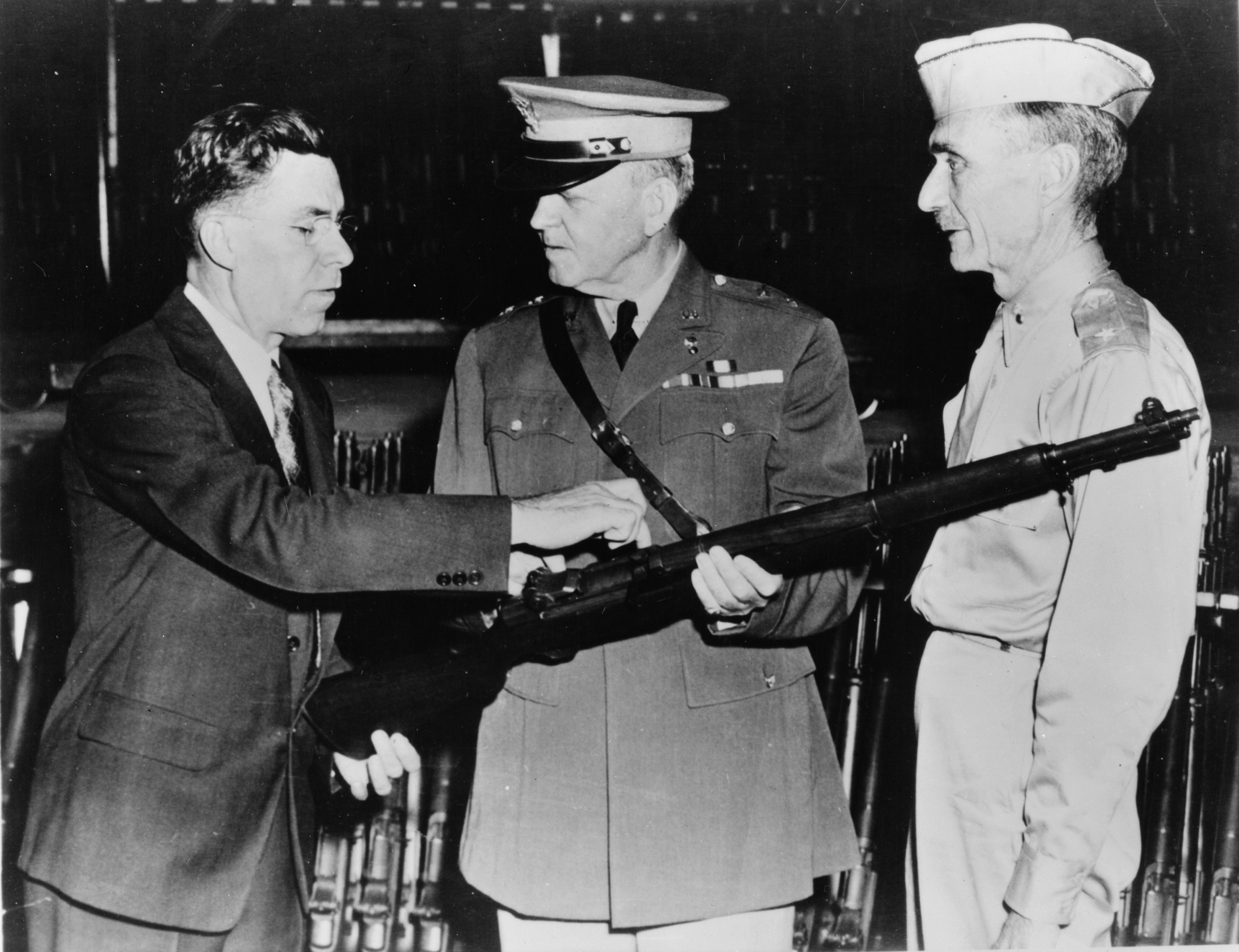
John Garand points out features of the M1 to US Army generals.

All soldiers were equipped with hand grenades. Special units such as flamethrower teams, wire cutter teams, and 81mm mortar teams could be assigned to companies as well as medics joining a battalion. These teams usually consisted of anywhere from two to five people with special training using their weapon. Soldiers could carry a total of 16 US issued guns during battle.

== US developments of other technology ==
Early in the war, the British realised that while they had some technological advances, these required American assistance for production. The Tizard Mission was sent to the US with several of these key technologies. One, the cavity magnetron was a breakthrough for radar. The MIT Radiation Laboratory was formed to develop radar and this led to gun-laying and aircraft radar and the LORAN navigation system.

Another was the proximity fuze which the US developed to production so that it could be incorporated into bombs and artillery shells. When used in anti-aircraft guns the effectiveness against aircraft was significantly increased.

Prewar US battleship construction was limited by the Washington Naval Treaty and subsequent London Naval Treaty. The US response to the treaty which limited tonnage, and hence battleship numbers and speed, was to develop and implement high pressure boilers and stabilized guns, which permitted higher speeds, and greater accuracy of their fire from shorter, lighter battleships. Later US cruisers and battleships had their guns directed using information gathered from the ship's radar.

== See also ==
- Technology during World War II
