= Horten H.XVIII =

Proposed intercontinental bomber

H.XVIII
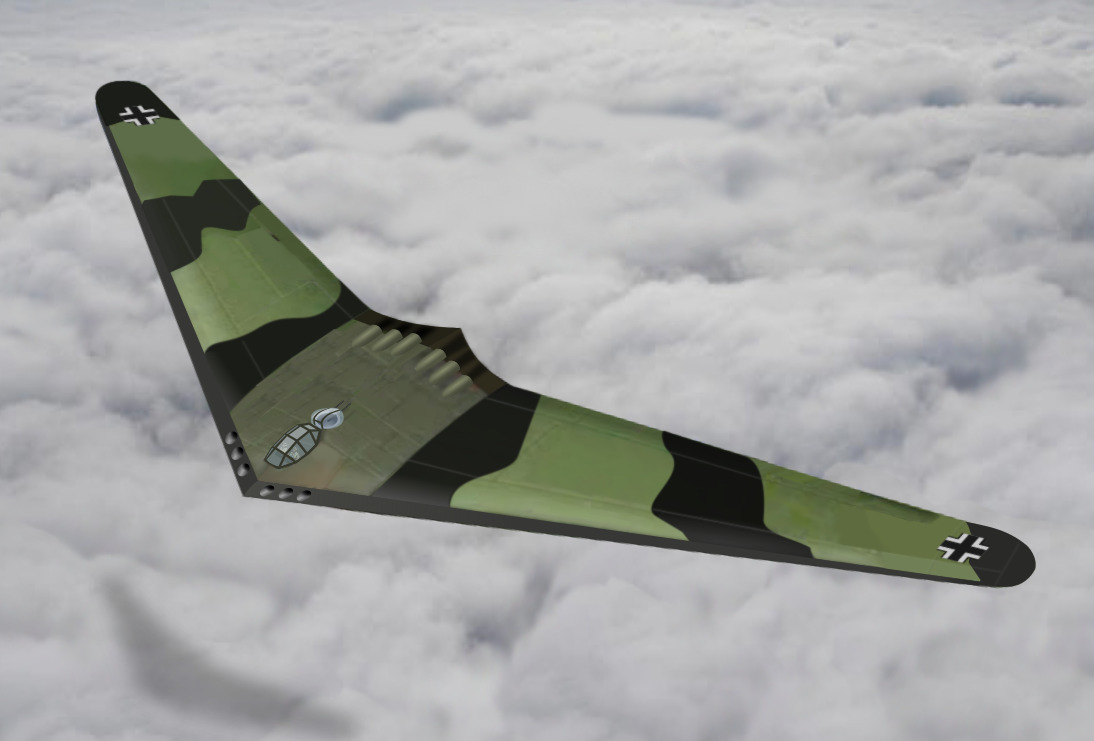
- Artist's concept of the aircraft in flight

General information
- Type: Long-range bomber
- National origin: Nazi Germany
- Designer: Walter and Reimar Horten

History
- Developed from: Horten Ho 229

The Horten H.XVIII (18) was a proposed German World War II intercontinental bomber, designed by the Horten brothers. The unbuilt H.XVIII represented, in many respects, a scaled-up version of the Horten Ho 229, a prototype jet fighter. The H.XVIII was one of many proposed designs for the Langstreckenbomber, and would have carried sufficient fuel for transatlantic flights.

== Design ==
The ability of bomber crews, in an aircraft such as the Horten H.XVIII, to attack targets in North America, might have been hampered by existing and emerging Allied air defence strategies and technologies, such as:

- increasing air attacks on German factories and airbases;
- intelligence gathering, especially advances in cryptanalysis;
- ongoing improvements in radar (especially early warning and airborne radar), and;
- high-altitude and/or long-range combat air patrols.

== Variants ==
=== H.XVIIIA ===
The A model of the H.XVIII was a long, smooth blended wing body. Its six turbojet engines were buried deep in the wing and the exhausts centered on the trailing end. Resembling the Horten Ho 229 flying wing fighter there were many odd features that distinguished this aircraft; the jettisonable landing gear and the wing made of wood and carbon based glue, are but two. The aircraft was first proposed for the Langstreckenbomber competition initiated in late 1944 and was personally reviewed by Hermann Göring: after review, the Horten brothers were forced to share design and construction of the aircraft with Junkers and Messerschmitt engineers, who wanted to add a single rudder fin as well as suggesting underwing pods to house the engines and landing gear.

=== H.XVIIIB ===
The B model of the H.XVIIIB was generally the same as the A model, except the four (down from six) engines and four-wheel retractable landing gear were now housed in underwing pods, and the three-man crew housed under a bubble canopy. The aircraft was to be built in huge concrete hangars and operate off long runways with construction due to start in autumn 1945, but the end of the war came with no progress made. Defensive armament was considered unnecessary due to the expected high performance.

=== H.XVIIIC/B-2 ===
The C model of the H.XVIII was based on the airframe of the H.XVIIIA with a huge tail. It had an MG 151 turret set in the middle rear of the wing and with six BMW 003 turbojets slung under the wings; this was designed by Messerschmitt and Junkers engineers. It is uncertain if this overall design was directly developed by the Horten brothers or their manufacturer, as there is little surviving evidence of this proposed version. It was eventually rejected by the Horten brothers, as it was not a major improvement over the Ho XVIIIA.

== Specifications (H.XVIIIA) ==
Data from

General characteristics

- Crew: 3
- Length: 19.0 m (62 ft 4 in)
- Wingspan: 40.0 m (131 ft 3 in)
- Height: 5.8 m (19 ft 0 in)
- Wing area: 150 m^{2} (1,600 sq ft)
- Aspect ratio: 10.7
- Empty weight: 11,000 kg (24,251 lb)
- Max takeoff weight: 32,000 kg (70,548 lb)
- Fuel capacity: 16,000 kg (35,274 lb)
- Leading edge sweepback: 24.3
- Aerofoil thickness: 16%
- Powerplant: 6 × Junkers Jumo 004 turbojet engines, 8.8 kN (2,000 lbf) thrust each

Performance

- Maximum speed: 820 km/h (510 mph, 440 kn)
- Cruise speed: 750 km/h (470 mph, 400 kn)
- Never exceed speed: 900 km/h (560 mph, 490 kn) * Towing speed: 192 km/h (119 mph)
- Landing speed: 136 km/h (85 mph)
- Wing loading: 213 kg/m^{2} (44 lb/sq ft)
- Thrust/weight: 0.17

Armament

- Guns: 4 MG151/20 Cannon, 2 in a nose Barbette and 2 more in a top/aft turret
- Bombs: 4,000 kg (8,818 lb) of bombs

== See also ==
Related development

- Horten Ho 229

Aircraft of comparable role, configuration, and era

- Northrop YB-49

Related lists

- List of jet aircraft of World War II
- List of flying wing aircraft
