= Zielgerät 1229 =

German WWII infrared rifle scope ("Vampir")

Zielgerät 1229 «Vampir»
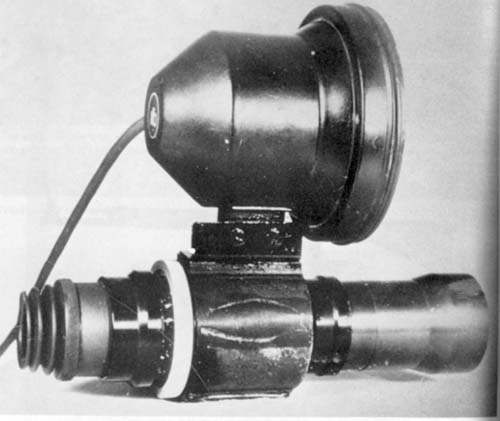
- Type: night vision scope
- Place of origin: Nazi Germany

Service history
- Wars: World War II

Production history
- Designer: Allgemeine Elektrizitäts-Gesellschaft (AEG); Forschungsanstalt der Deutschen Reichspost (RPF)
- Designed: 1943—1944
- Manufacturer: Ernst Leitz GmbH
- Produced: 1944—1945
- No. built: not less than 200

Specifications
- Mass: 2.26 kg (sight with infrared illuminator); 13.59 kg (batteries)

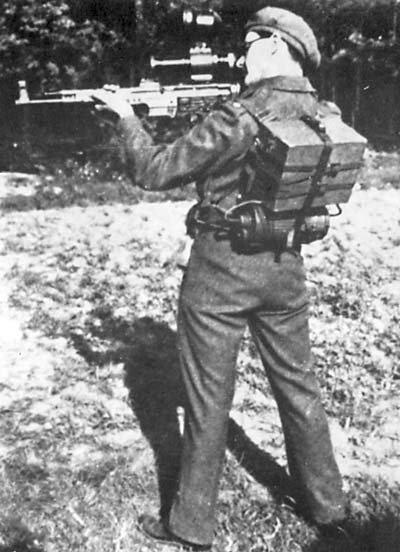
The Zielgerät ZG 1229 Vampir displayed by a British soldier

The ZG 1229 Vampir 1229 (ZG 1229), also known by its code name Vampir, was an active infrared device developed for the Wehrmacht for the Sturmgewehr 44 assault rifle during World War II, intended primarily for night use. The ZG 1229 was designed by Allgemeine Elektrizitäts-Gesellschaft (AEG) and Forschungsanstalt der Deutschen Reichspost (RPF). It was produced by Ernst Leitz GmbH and between 200 and 310 units were built. A grenadier carrying it was known as a Nachtjäger (night-hunter).

== Design ==
The ZG 1229 Vampir weighed 2.26 kilograms (5.0 lb) and was fitted with lugs on the StG 44 at C.G. Haenel in Suhl, the weapons production facility. As well as the sight and infrared spotlight, there was a wooden-cased battery for the light weighing 13.59 kilograms (30.0 lb), and a second battery fitted inside a gas mask container to power the image converter. This was all strapped to a Tragegestell 39 (pack frame 1939). The searchlight consisted of a conventional tungsten light source shining through a filter permitting only infrared light. The sensor operated in the near-infrared (light) spectrum rather than in the thermal infrared (heat) spectrum and was, therefore, not sensitive to body heat.

The image given was described as being of great brilliance and good contrast. Standing men could be discerned up to 73 metres (80 yd), especially when moving. However, reports indicate that ZG 1229 units were extremely delicate and considered too cumbersome for attack situations.

== Operational history ==
Successful tests of the infrared sighting device for small arms were made by the Panzergrenadiere during February and March of 1945. (According to other reports — the army trials never took place.)

Deployment of StG 44s with ZG 1229 sights began only in the last months of the war, and most researchers agree that there is no reliable information considering combat use of the sights of this type.

Nevertheless, Waldemar Trojca quotes Eastern Front veterans who claimed to have encountered German snipers using night sights on small arms:

Small arms infrared device introduction must have taken place in early 1944. Both my late grandfather, Gerhard Sarnes, and one of the ex-soldiers that I interviewed, did recall Eastern Front snipers shooting at night with the aid of "peculiar non-shining torches coupled with enormous optical sights" mounted on their rifles. Similar infrared gear was fitted to both MG34 and MG42 GPMGs.

However, here he contradicts his own statement that the ZG 1229 was first used in combat in February 1945. In addition, the short target detection range would have made the use of this sight by snipers and machine gunners extremely difficult, if not impossible.

Similar infrared gear (FG 1250) was fitted to the machine guns of Pz.Kpfw. V Panther tanks and Sd.Kfz. 251 Falke armored personnel carriers.
