= Horten Ho 229 =

German prototype jet powered flying wing fighter (1944)

Ho 229
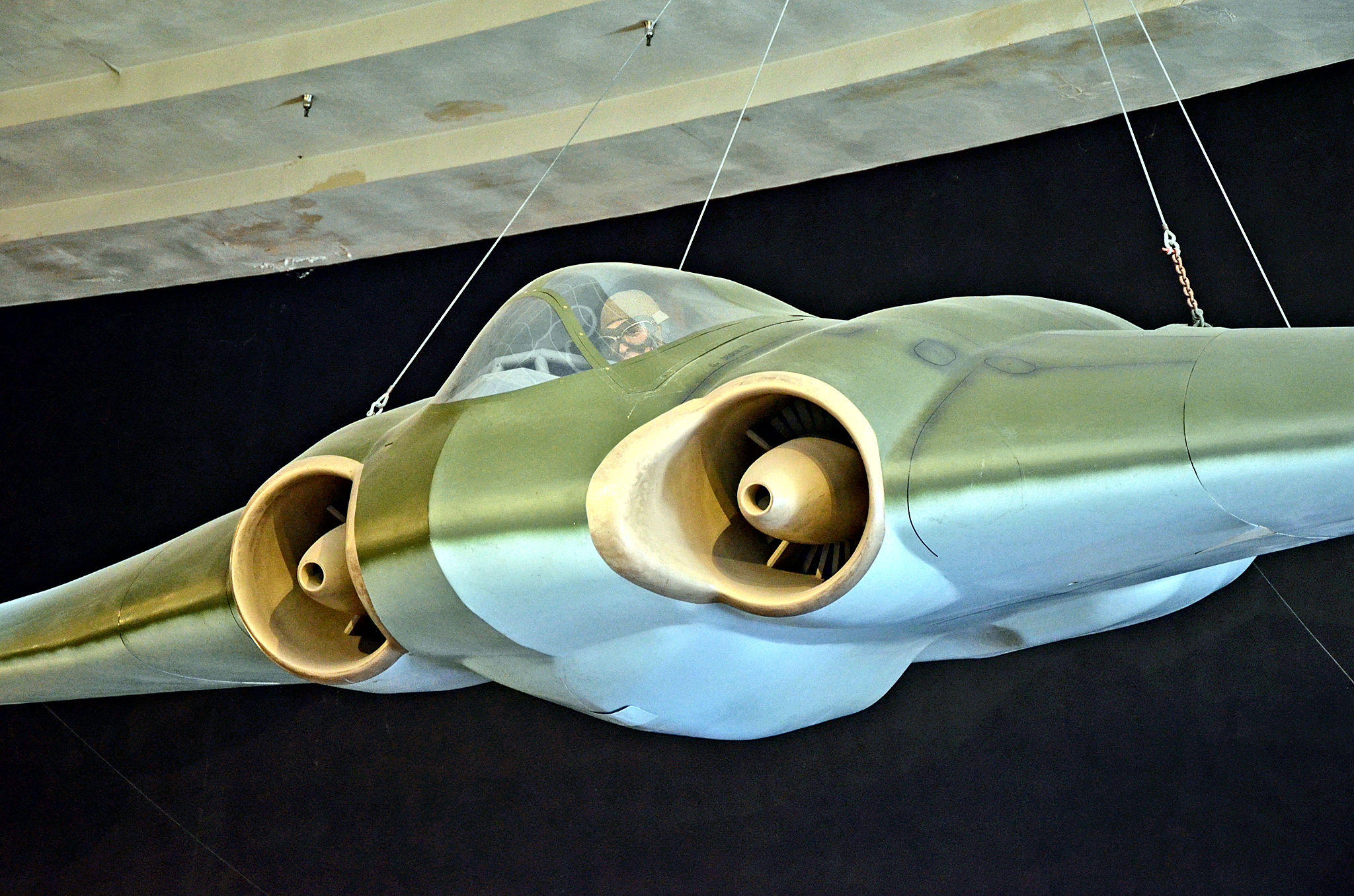
- Radar-testing H.IX V3 reproduction at the San Diego Air and Space Museum

General information
- Type: Fighter/bomber
- Manufacturer: Gothaer Waggonfabrik
- Designer: Horten brothers
- Primary user: Luftwaffe
- Number built: 3

History
- First flight: 1 March 1944 (glider); 2 February 1945 (powered)

The Horten H.IX, RLM designation Ho 229 (or Gotha Go 229 for extensive re-design work done by Gotha to prepare the aircraft for mass production) is a German prototype fighter-bomber designed by Reimar and Walter Horten to be built by Gothaer Waggonfabrik. Developed at a late stage of the Second World War, it was one of the earliest flying wing aircraft to be powered by jet engines.

The Ho 229 was designed in response to a call made in 1943 by Hermann Göring, the head of the Luftwaffe, for light bombers capable of meeting the "3×1000" requirement; namely, to carry 1,000 kilograms (2,200 lb) of bombs a distance of 1,000 kilometres (620 mi) with a speed of 1,000 kilometres per hour (620 mph). Only jet propulsion could achieve the required speed, but such engines were very fuel-hungry, necessitating considerable effort across the rest of the design to meet the range requirement.

The flying wing configuration was favoured by the Horten brothers due to its high aerodynamic efficiency, as demonstrated by their Horten H.IV glider. In order to minimise drag, the Ho 229 was not fitted with extraneous flight control surfaces. Its ceiling was 15,000 metres (49,000 ft). The Ho 229 was the only design that came close to the requirements, and the Horten brothers quickly received an order for three prototypes after the project gained Göring's approval.

Due to the Horten brothers' lack of suitable production facilities, Ho 229 manufacturing was contracted out to Gothaer Waggonfabrik, but the company allegedly undermined the project by seeking the favour of Luftwaffe officials for its own flying wing design. On 1 March 1944, the first prototype H.IX V1, an unpowered glider, made its maiden flight, followed by the H.IX V2, powered by Junkers Jumo 004 turbojet engines in December 1944. However, on 18 February 1945, the V2 was destroyed in a crash, killing its test pilot.

Despite as many as 100 production aircraft being on order, none were completed. The nearly complete H.IX V3 prototype was captured by the American military and shipped to the United States under Operation Paperclip. It was evaluated by both British and American researchers before entering long term storage. The H.IX V3 is on static display in the Smithsonian National Air and Space Museum.

== Design and development ==
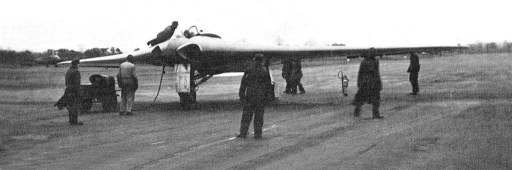
The Horten H.IX V2 before a test flight

During the early 1930s the Horten brothers had become interested in the flying wing configuration as a method of improving the performance of gliders. At that time the German government was actively funding glider clubs as a response to the production of aircraft suitable for military roles being forbidden by the Treaty of Versailles. The flying wing layout theoretically offered the lowest possible weight, and without the added drag of the fuselage. Their first aircraft of this configuration was the Horten H.IV.

In 1943 Hermann Göring issued a request for design proposals for a bomber capable of carrying a 1,000 kilograms (2,200 lb) load over 1,000 kilometres (620 mi) at 1,000 kilometres per hour (620 mph) which was known as the "3×1000 project". German bombers could reach Allied targets across Great Britain, but were suffering devastating losses from Allied fighters. At the time, no conventional means for aircraft designers to meet these goals seemed viable because while the new Junkers Jumo 004B turbojets provided the speed, excessive fuel consumption limited range. The Horten brothers concluded that a low-drag flying wing design could meet the goals, as by reducing drag, cruise power could be reduced so the range requirement could then be met. They put forward their private project, the H.IX, as the basis for the bomber.

While removing the vertical stabilizer reduced drag, it caused yaw control problems. In traditional aircraft, a vertical stabilizer works passively to ensure that sideslip is minimized by producing a force perpendicular to itself when any sideslip occurs. The lack of a vertical stabilizer meant that flying without any active yaw control would lead to an uncontrolled sideslip, and potentially flat spins. This was resolved with split ailerons, which increase drag on one side. While designs without vertical stabilizers require more active control by the pilot or a future flight control systems and lead to bank angle restrictions, they do reduce aerodynamic drag slightly.

The Government Air Ministry (Reichsluftfahrtministerium) quickly approved Horten's proposal, but ordered the addition of two 30 mm (1.2 in) cannons, as they felt the aircraft might also be useful as a fighter due to it being significantly faster than existing Allied aircraft. German officials assigned the designation Ho 229 to the aircraft. Göring was reportedly impressed with the design and personally intervened to ensure that three prototypes were ordered at a cost of 500,000 Reichsmarks. The Air Ministry issued an order for 100 production aircraft, but this was later reduced to 20. Furthermore, as the Horten brothers lacked production facilities, it was decided that the manufacturing would be done by an established company, Gothaer Waggonfabrik. This arrangement was complicated by Gothaer's alleged efforts to persuade the authorities to favour its own projects, which included flying wings, over the Ho 229.

Observing the Ho 229's design and development difficulties, Russell Lee, the chair of the Aeronautics Department at the National Air and Space Museum, speculated that an important motivation for the Horten brothers was to prevent them and their workers from being assigned dangerous roles by the German military. Looking beyond the Ho 229, the Horten brothers produced numerous flying wing designs, such as the Horten H.VII fighter-trainer and the Horten H.XVIII Amerikabomber. According to the aviation historian Jean-Denis G.G. LePage, other German wartime projects were inspired by the Horten brother's work.

The H.IX was of mixed construction with the center section built up from welded steel tubing with a diameter up to 160 mm (6.3 in), while the outer box wing spars were of pine.

The outer wings were skinned with thin plywood panels that were glued together with a sawdust mixture and covered with fireproof paint. The wing had a single main spar, penetrated by the jet engine inlets, and a secondary spar used for mounting the elevons. It was designed with a 7g load factor and a 1.8× safety rating giving the aircraft a 12.6g ultimate load rating. The wing's chord/thickness ratio ranged from 15% at the root to 8% at the wingtips. There was little available interior space, making the addition of additional equipment or crew members difficult or impossible.

The aircraft was fitted with retractable tricycle landing gear, with the nose gear on the first two prototypes from a Heinkel He 177's tailwheel system, with the third prototype using an He 177A main gear wheel rim and tire on a newly designed nose gear leg. A drogue parachute slowed the aircraft upon landing. The pilot sat on a primitive ejection seat and a special pressure suit was developed by Dräger. While originally designed for the BMW 003 turbojet engine, this engine was not ready, and the Junkers Jumo 004 engine was substituted. Flight control was achieved via a combination of elevons and spoilers. This control system included both long-span (inboard) and short-span (outboard) spoilers, with the smaller outboard spoilers activated first; it reportedly provided a smoother control of yaw than would have been by a single-spoiler system.

== Operational history ==
=== Testing and evaluation ===
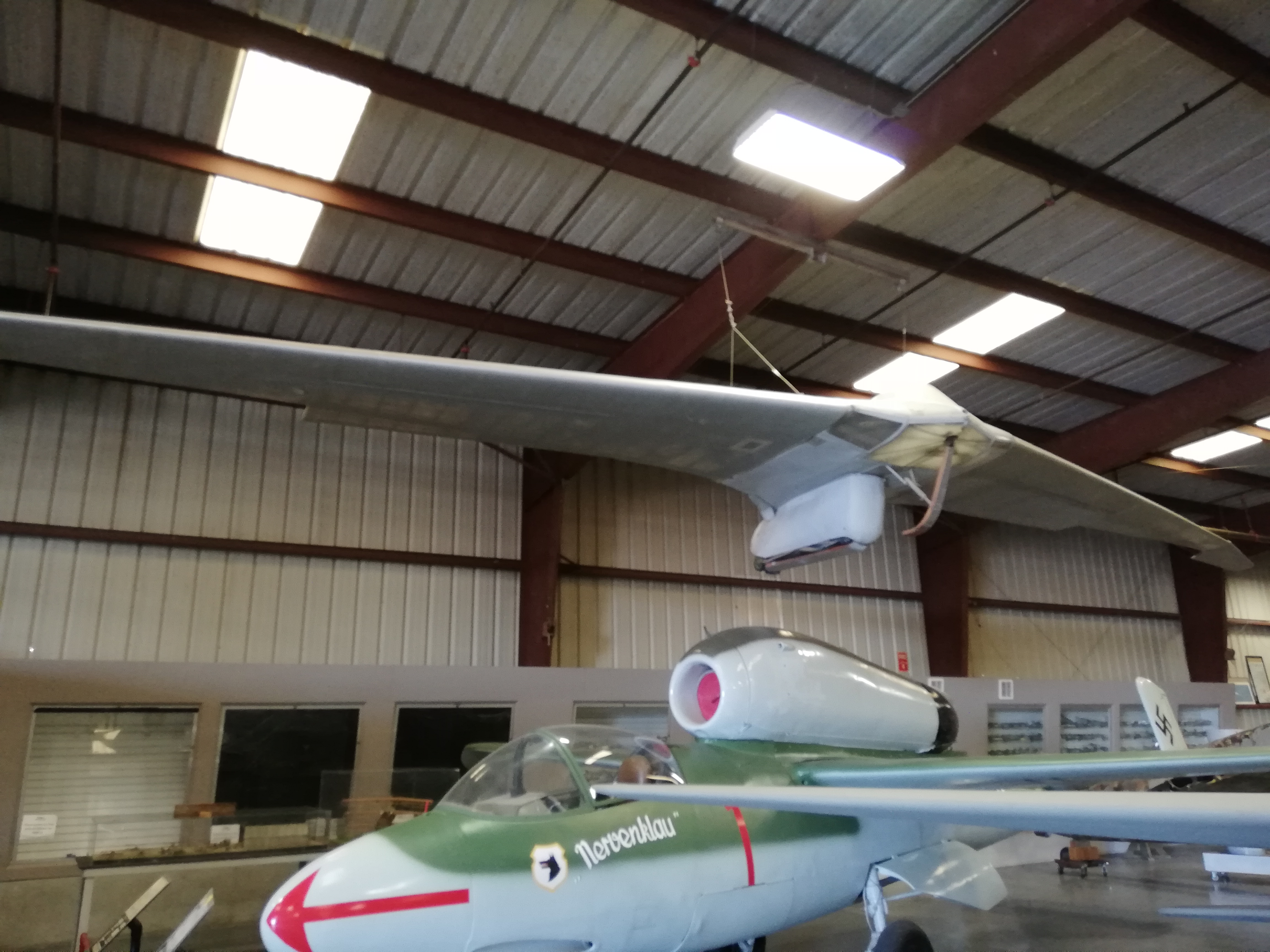
Horten IV glider (hanging, top)

The first prototype H.IX V1, an unpowered glider with fixed tricycle landing gear, was first flown on 1 March 1944. Flight results were favorable, but there was an accident when the pilot attempted to land without first retracting a test instrument. Following the transference of design responsibility from the Horten brothers to Gothaer Waggonfabrik, the company's design team implemented several changes, including adding a simple ejection seat, substantially redesigned the undercarriage to enable a higher gross weight, changes to the engine intakes, and they added ducting to air-cool the jet engine's outer casing to prevent damage to adjacent wood.

The H.IX V1 was followed in December 1944 by the Junkers Jumo 004-powered second prototype H.IX V2. The BMW 003 engine was preferred but was not available. Göring believed in the design and ordered a production series of 40 aircraft from Gothaer Waggonfabrik with the RLM designation Ho 229, even though it had not yet taken to the air under jet power. On 2 February 1945, the first flight of the H.IX V2 was conducted at Oranienburg. The Horten brothers were unable to witness this flight as they were occupied with producing the design for a new turbojet-powered strategic bomber in response to the Amerikabomber competition. All of the subsequent test flights and development were conducted by Gothaer Waggonfabrik. The test pilot was Leutnant Erwin Ziller. Two further test flights were performed on 2 February 1945 and on 18 February 1945.

Two weeks later, on 18 February 1945, disaster struck during the third test flight. After about 45 minutes in the air, at an altitude of around 800 m, one of the engines caught fire and stopped. Ziller was seen to put the aircraft into a dive and pull up several times in an attempt to restart the engine. Ziller made a series of four complete turns at 20° angle of bank. He did not use his radio or eject, and may already have been unconscious from the fumes from the burning engine. It crashed just outside the airfield boundary and Ziller later died from his injuries while the aircraft was destroyed.

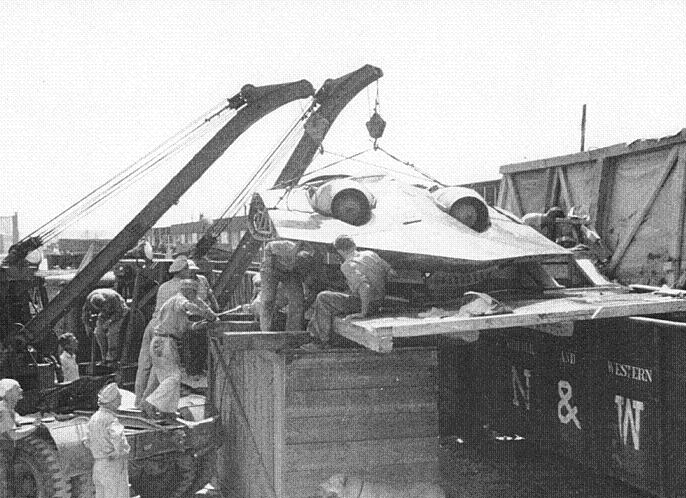
Unloading of the captured Horten Ho 229 V3 in the United States.

Despite this, the project continued. On 12 March 1945, nearly a week after the U.S. Army had launched Operation Lumberjack to cross the Rhine River, the Ho 229 was included in the Jäger-Notprogramm (Emergency Fighter Program) for the accelerated production of inexpensive "wonder weapons". The prototype workshop was moved to the Gothaer Waggonfabrik (Gotha) in Friedrichroda, western Thuringia. The same month, work was started on the third prototype, the Ho 229 V3.

The V3 was larger than previous prototypes, the shape being modified in various areas, and it was meant to be a template for the pre-production series Ho 229 A-0 day fighters, of which 20 had been ordered. The V3 was to be powered by two Jumo 004C engines, each with 10% greater thrust than the earlier Jumo 004B engine used for the Me 262A and Ar 234B, and had two MK 108 30 mm (1.2 in) cannons in the wing roots. Work had also started on the two-seat V4 and night-fighter V5 prototypes, the V6 armament test prototype, and the V7 two-seat trainer.

In April 1945, George Patton’s Third Army found four Horten prototypes, the Ho 229s and a Horten glider. Of three Ho 229s, the V3 was nearest to completion, and was shipped to the United States for evaluation. The Ho 229 spent a brief time at RAE Farnborough in the UK and during this time installing British jet engines was considered, but the mountings were incompatible with the larger diameter British turbojets. It is uncertain if the aircraft's original Junkers engines were ever run, although the American evaluation team at one point intended to fly it.

== Surviving aircraft ==
The only surviving Ho 229 airframe, the V3—and the only surviving Second World War-era German jet prototype still in existence—is on display in the main hall of the Steven F. Udvar-Hazy Center of the Smithsonian National Air and Space Museum (NASM) alongside other WWII-era German aircraft. It is displayed partially restored, the wings of the aircraft displayed separately from the center section.

Prior to being placed on display in 2017, it was stored at the NASM's Paul E. Garber Restoration Facility in Suitland, Maryland, U.S. In December 2011, the National Air and Space Museum moved the Ho 229 into the active restoration area of the Garber Restoration Facility, where it was reviewed for full restoration and display.

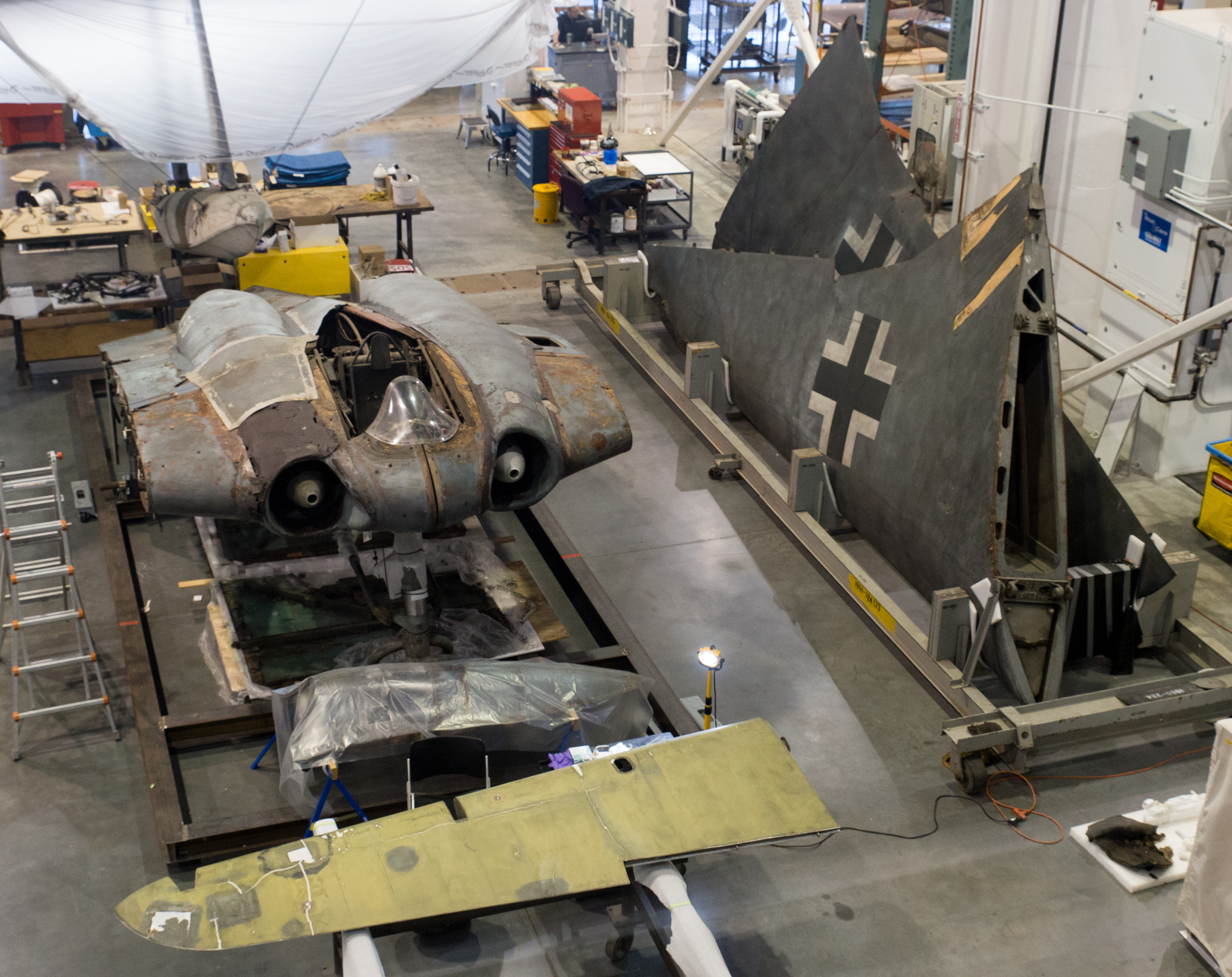
Horten 229 in 2016 while the center section (left) was under restoration. Wings stored separately (right).

The central section of the V3 prototype was moved to the NASM's Steven F. Udvar-Hazy Center in late 2012 to commence a detailed examination of it before starting any serious conservation/restoration efforts and was cleared for the move to the Udvar-Hazy facility's restoration shops by summer 2014. Following work performed within the Udvar-Hazy facility's Mary Baker Engen Restoration Hangar, it was put on display.

== Claimed stealth technology ==
=== Radar absorbent material ===
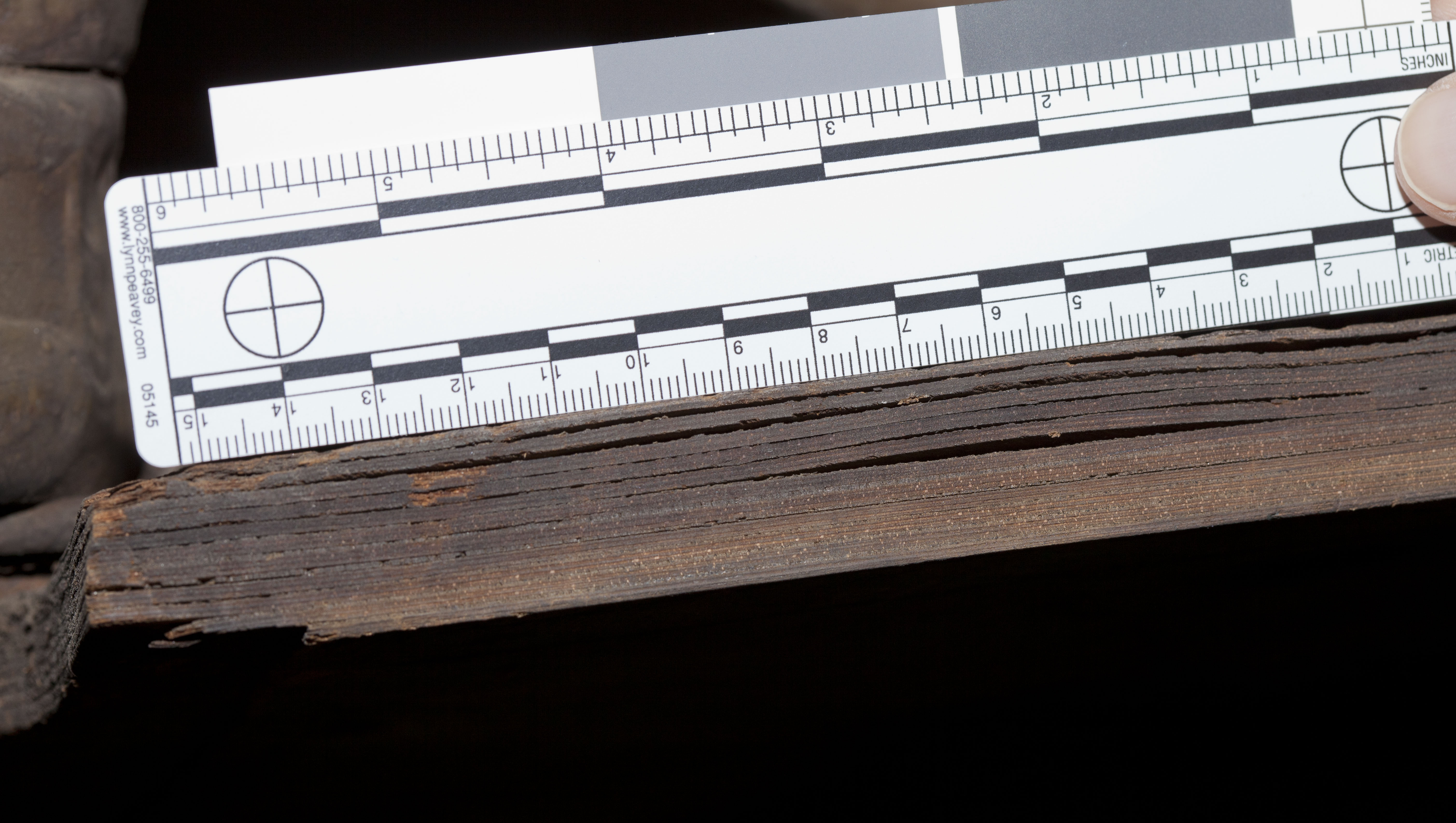
Cross-section of the Horten Ho 229 composite wood laminate

In 1983, after hearing details of the US stealth system, Reimar Horten advanced a claim that he had intended to add charcoal dust to the wood glue to absorb electromagnetic waves (radar), to shield the aircraft from the British early-warning ground-based radar system known as Chain Home. (Note: During the war the British also introduced 200MHz radars for early warning of low flying aircraft (Chain Home Low) and target tracking for ground-controlled interception (AMES Type 7)) This charcoal glue treatment was supposedly planned for the unbuilt production aircraft however, the V3 prototype did not make use of charcoal, and no documentation has been found supporting the claim.

Northrop Grumman engineers conducted electromagnetic tests on the V3's multilayer wood nose cone in 2008. They tested across a frequency range of 12 to 117 THz, with a 10 micron wavelength. The cone was 19 mm (0.75 in) thick and made from thin sheets of veneer. The team observed that the "Ho 229 leading edge has the same characteristics as the plywood [of the control sample] except that the frequencies have a slightly shorter bandwidth," which they go on to conclude was likely due to oxidization of the wood. The team, who assumed the presence of carbon black from visual inspection alone, concluded that the "similarity of the two tests indicates that the design using the carbon black type material produced a poor absorber." The Smithsonian Institution then performed a study of the materials used on the prototype, and determined that there is "no evidence of carbon black or charcoal", refuting the hypothesis.

=== Radar cross section and shape ===
A jet-powered flying wing such as the Horten Ho 229 might have a smaller radar cross-section (RCS) than conventional contemporary twin-engine aircraft because the wings are blended into the fuselage and there are no large propeller disks or vertical and horizontal tail surfaces to provide a typical identifiable radar signature, however the front and rear faces of the exposed jet engines do provide a similar degree of reflectivity to propellers.

In early 2008, Northrop Grumman paired television documentary producer Michael Jorgensen and the National Geographic Channel to make a documentary to determine whether the Ho 229 was the first "stealth" aircraft. Northrop Grumman built a full-size non-flying reproduction of the V3, primarily made of wood, unlike the original aircraft, which had an extensive steel space-frame to which the wooden skin was bolted. After an expenditure of about US$250,000 and 2,500 man-hours, Northrop's Ho 229 reproduction was tested at the company's Radar Cross Section test range at Tejon, California, US where it was placed on a 15 m (49 ft) pole and exposed to electromagnetic energy sources from various angles from 100 m (330 ft), using three HF/VHF frequencies in the 20–50 MHz range.

Radar simulations showed a hypothetical Ho 229, with the radar characteristics of the mockup, which had neither metal frame nor the highly reflective engines, approaching the English coast from France flying at 885 km/h (550 mph) at 15–30 m (49–98 ft) above the water would still have been visible to an old and by then already retired model of the Chain Home radar at a distance of 80% that of a Bf 109, while all other systems showed no significant change.

== Variants ==
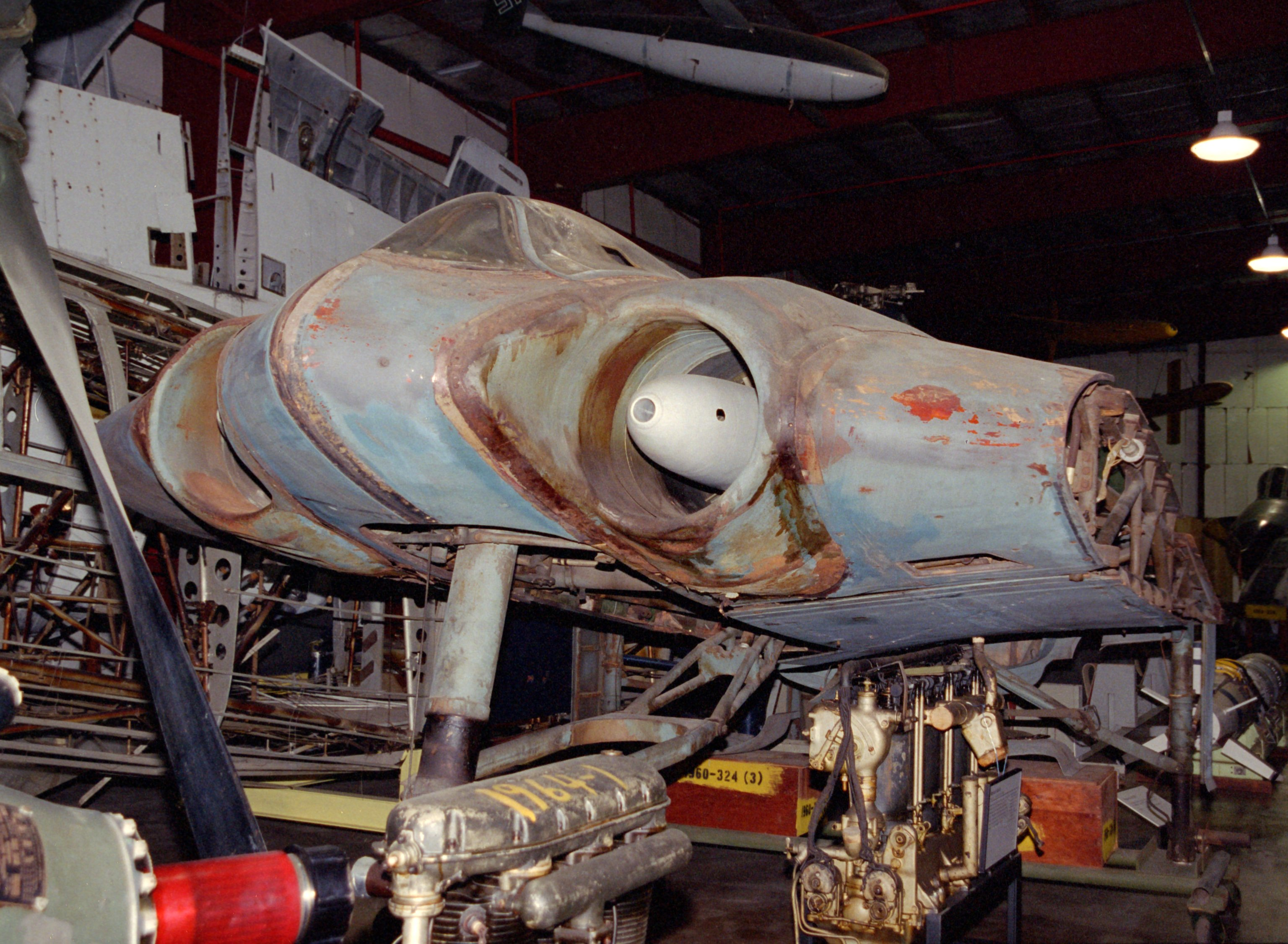
Horten Ho 229 V3 prototype at the Smithsonian's Garber restoration facility (National Air and Space Museum)

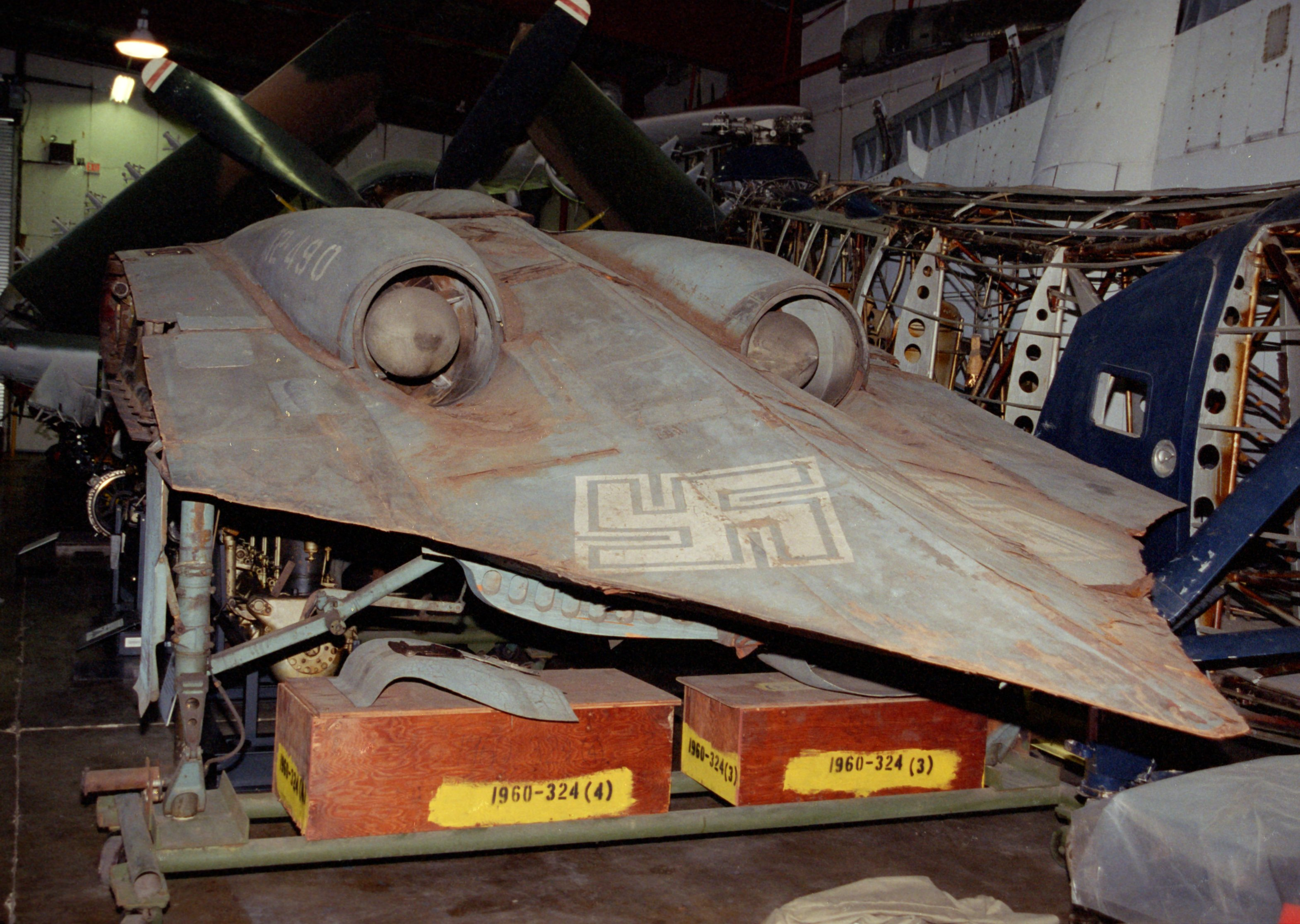
Rear view of Horten Ho 229 prototype

H.IX V1
First prototype, an unpowered glider, one built and flown (three-view drawing below).
H.IX V2
First powered prototype, one built and flown with twin Junkers Jumo 004B engines.

Gotha developments:

Ho 229 V3
Revised air intakes, engines moved forward to correct longitudinal imbalance. Its nearly completed airframe was captured in production, with two Junkers Jumo 004B jet engines installed in the airframe.
Ho 229 V4
Planned two-seat all-weather fighter, in construction at Friedrichroda, but not much more than the center-section's tubular framework completed.
Ho 229 V5
Planned two-seat all-weather fighter, in construction at Friedrichroda, but not much more than the center-section's tubular framework completed.
Ho 229 V6
Projected definitive single-seat fighter version with different cannon, one captured in production at Ilmenau by US troops.

Horten developments:

H.IXb (also designated V6 and V7 by the Hortens)
Projected two-seat trainer or night-fighter; not built.

Ho 229 A-0
Projected expedited production version based on Ho 229 V6; not built.

== Specifications (Horten H.IX V2) ==
Data from Nurflügel, (Ho 229A)The Complete Book of Fighters

General characteristics

- Crew: 1
- Length: 7.4 m (24 ft 3 in) chord at centre-line
  Orthographically diagram

Ho 229A: 7.47 m (24.5 ft)

- Wingspan: 16.8 m (55 ft 1 in)

Ho 229A: 16.76 m (55.0 ft)

- Height: 1.1 m (3 ft 7 in) cockpit height

Ho 229A: 2.81 m (9 ft 3 in) overall height

- Wing area: 52.8 m^{2} (568 sq ft)

Ho 229A: 50.2 m^{2} (540 sq ft)

- Aspect ratio: 7.8
- Empty weight: 4,844 kg (10,679 lb)

Ho 229A: 4,600 kg (10,100 lb)

- Max takeoff weight: 6,876 kg (15,159 lb)

Ho 229A: 8,100 kg (17,900 lb)

- Fuel capacity: 1,700 kg (3,700 lb)
- Powerplant: 2 × Junkers Jumo 004B turbojet engine, 8.83 kN (1,990 lbf) thrust each

Performance

- Maximum speed: 960 km/h (600 mph, 520 kn)

Ho 229A: 950 km/h (590 mph; 510 kn) / M0.77 at sea level; 977 km/h (607 mph; 528 kn) / M0.92 at 12,000 m (39,000 ft)

- Cruise speed: 900 km/h (560 mph, 490 kn)
- Never exceed speed: 1,000 km/h (620 mph, 540 kn)
- Take-off speed: 150 km/h (93 mph; 81 kn)
- Landing speed: 130 km/h (81 mph; 70 kn)
- Range: 1,900 km (1,200 mi, 1,000 nmi) maximum
- Rate of climb: 22 m/s (4,300 ft/min)
- Wing loading: 130 kg/m^{2} (27 lb/sq ft)
- Thrust/weight: 0.382

Armament

- Guns: Ho 229A: 2x 30 mm (1.181 in) MK 108 cannon

== See also ==
Related development

- Horten H.XVIII
- Gotha Go P.60

Aircraft of comparable role, configuration, and era

- Armstrong Whitworth A.W.52
- Northrop N-9M
- Northrop XP-79

Related lists

- List of aircraft of World War II
- List of jet aircraft of World War II
- List of flying wing aircraft
