= Mario Zippermayr =

Austrian physicist (1899–1979)

- Born: 25 April 1899; Milan, Italy
- Died: 13 January 1979 (aged 79); Kremsmünster, Upper Austria
- Occupation: Physicist
- Known for: Vacuum bomb

Mario Zippermayr (25 April 1899 – 13 January 1979) was an Austrian physicist and Nazi. He is considered the inventor of the thermobaric bomb.

== Biography ==
Mario Zippermayr was born in Milan, northern Italy, to Austrian parents. He studied in Freiburg and Karlsruhe. In 1927 he earned his doctorate in engineering and in 1938 his habilitation in physics. From 1933 he was a member of the Austrian Nazi Party and from 1938 a member of the SD.

Probably starting from 1942, he began setting up a research institute with about 35 employees in Vienna and Lofer (Salzburg).

The main developments in this laboratory were the air torpedo L 40, which could be dropped from any height and speed up to 700 km/h, the Dornier Do 335 high-speed aircraft and the Hexenkessel (Witch's Cauldron) project, which aimed to develop a highly effective detonation charge for use in a warhead of a surface-to-air missile.

== Vortex cannon ==
Coal dust was launched in a grenade, and dispersed by an explosive charge. The subsequent very large explosion was to achieve a high effectiveness. In 1943 the first test with a 60 kilogram thermobaric bomb was carried out. There were more tests on the military training area Doeberitz in Berlin and at Lake Starnberg. The best results were obtained with 60% liquid oxygen and 40% coal dust. The destruction radius in Döberitz was reportedly 600 meters, and 4 to 4.5 kilometres for the improved 25 to 50-kilogram bomb over Lake Starnberg. At the end of the war preparations were under way for the production of larger bombs with liquid oxygen in Nordhausen.

After Germany's capitulation Zippermayr remained in Lofer near the formerly secret weapons research facility Hochtal and willingly awaited visits to answer questions. Visitors included Leslie Earl Simon, head of the US Ballistic Research Laboratory. Zippermayr would detail how a hollow pipe could produce dispersal patterns of coal dust; this research produced the cover story of the vortex cannon, a mythical weapon that swept aircraft from the sky.

In later years Zippermayr continued to respond willingly to technical questions about his research, but did not, unlike other researchers, work for the Soviet Union or the US. In Lofer, Zippermayr developed a successful "climate-therapeutic method" for treating respiratory diseases: using high-voltage electric discharges he created artificial mountain air. The therapeutic successes, especially in whooping cough and respiratory problems, were so great that in 1953 he moved to Kremsmünster, Upper Austria, and there opened a special practice for this procedure.

He died at Kremsmünster in 1979.
