= John La Touche (lyricist) =

American lyricist and bookwriter (1914–1956)

John Treville Latouche (La Touche) (November 13, 1914, Baltimore, Maryland – August 7, 1956, Calais, Vermont) was a lyricist and bookwriter in American musical theater.

== Biography ==
John Treville Latouche was born in Baltimore, Maryland. His family moved to Richmond, Virginia, when he was four months old. There he attended John Marshall High School before going north to Columbia University. He became involved in music and theater, writing for the Varsity Show and joining the Philolexian Society. He did not graduate.

In 1937, Latouche contributed two songs in the revue Pins and Needles. For the show Sing for Your Supper (1939), he wrote the lyrics for "Ballad for Uncle Sam", later retitled "Ballad for Americans", with music by Earl Robinson. It was featured at both the 1940 Republican Convention and the convention of the American Communist Party and was extremely popular in 1940s America.

This 13-minute cantata to American democracy was written for a soloist and as well a full orchestra. When performed on the CBS Radio network by singer Paul Robeson, it became a national success. Subsequently, both Robeson and Bing Crosby regularly performed it. Actor and singer Brock Peters also made a notable recording of the cantata.

Latouche provided the lyrics for Vernon Duke's songs (including, with Ted Fetter, "Taking a Chance on Love") for the musical Cabin in the Sky (1940). He also wrote lyrics for Duke's musical Banjo Eyes (1941), which starred Eddie Cantor. He appeared as The Gangster in the experimental film Dreams That Money Can Buy (1947). He returned to music, writing the lyrics for the song "The Girl with the Pre-Fabricated Heart" (music by Louis Applebaum), which accompanies a sequence conceived by French artist Fernand Léger.

Latouche wrote the book and lyrics for The Golden Apple (1954) with music by Jerome Moross; it won the New York Drama Critics' Circle Award for Best Musical. In 1955 he provided additional lyrics for Leonard Bernstein's Candide.

Latouche also wrote the libretto to Douglas Moore's opera The Ballad of Baby Doe, one of the few American operas to join the standard repertoire. In 1955, he collaborated with co-writer Sam Locke and composer James Mundy on the Carol Channing vehicle The Vamp, which closed after a run of only 60 performances. He had been working with David Merrick on setting the Eugene O'Neill play Ah, Wilderness to music, but died while working on the adaptation. It was later developed as Take Me Along.

Latouche was a protégé of James Branch Cabell and friends with writers Gore Vidal and Jack Woodford. Latouche dated Louella Woodford when they were both teenagers. He also was friends with the architect William Alexander Levy (who designed and built Hangover House for travel writer Richard Halliburton), and writer Paul Mooney, who assisted Halliburton in several of his classic travel works.

Latouche died of a sudden heart attack at his home in Calais, Vermont, aged 41.

== Legacy ==
The New York Theatre Company produced Taking a Chance on Love - The Lyrics and Life of John LaTouche, A New Musical Revue ("The Bad Boy of Broadway Is Back") in 2000, with notes by Ned Rorem (recorded by Original Cast Records).

The John LaTouche Archive, containing journals, family letters, scrapbooks of photographs and newspaper articles, is housed at Columbia University. Out in the World - Selected Letters of Jane Bowles 1935-1970, edited by Millicent Dillon (Santa Barbara: Black Sparrow Press, 1985), contains a number of references to LaTouche, and his circle of friends and acquaintances. Chapter 28 of The Autobiography of Jack Woodford (Doubleday, Garden City, 1962) is devoted to La Touche.

== Notable songs ==
- "Backer's Audition" with John Strauss and Kenward Elmslie
- "The Best of All Possible Worlds" with Leonard Bernstein
- "Brown Penny" with Duke Ellington
- "Day Dream" with Duke Ellington and Billy Strayhorn
- "I Didn't Do A Thing Last Night" with Madame Spivy
- "I Love Town" with Peter van Eyck (as Goetz Eyck)
- "I've Got Me" with Duke Ellington
- "Lazy Afternoon" with Jerome Moross
- "My Love" with Leonard Bernstein and Richard Wilbur
- "A Nail in the Horseshoe" with John Strauss
- "Not a Care in the World" with Vernon Duke
- "On the Wrong Side of the Railroad Tracks" with Duke Ellington
- "Ragtime Romeo" with James Mundy
- "Summer Is A-Comin' In" with Vernon Duke
- "Surrealist" with Madame Spivy
- "Taking a Chance on Love" with Vernon Duke
- "Wind Flowers" with Jerome Moross
- "You Were Dead, You Know" with Leonard Bernstein and Richard Wilbur

== Works ==
- Walpurgis Eve (1928 play)
- Flair-Flair, the Idol of Paree (1935 musical)
- Ballad for Americans (1939 cantata)
- Cabin in the Sky (1940 musical)
- Banjo Eyes (1941 musical)
- The Lady Comes Across (1942 musical)
- Rhapsody (1944 operetta)
- Polonaise (1945 musical)
- Beggar's Holiday (1946 musical)
- The Golden Apple (1954 musical)
- The Vamp (1955 musical)
- The Ballad of Baby Doe (1956 opera)
- Candide (1956 operetta, additional lyrics)

== Bibliography ==
- Pollack, Howard (2017). The ballad of John Latouche. New York, NY: Oxford University Press. ISBN 9780190458294.
