= William Levy =

William Levy may refer to:

- William Levy (author) (1939–2019), American writer
- William Levy (actor) (born 1980), Cuban-American actor
- William Alexander Levy (1909–1997), American architect and interior designer
- William M. Levy (1827–1882), U.S. Representative from Louisiana

== See also ==
- William Auerbach-Levy (1889–1964), Russian-American painter and artist
