= Zone Policeman 88 =

1913 book by Harry A. Franck

Zone Policeman 88: a close range study of the Panama Canal and its workers
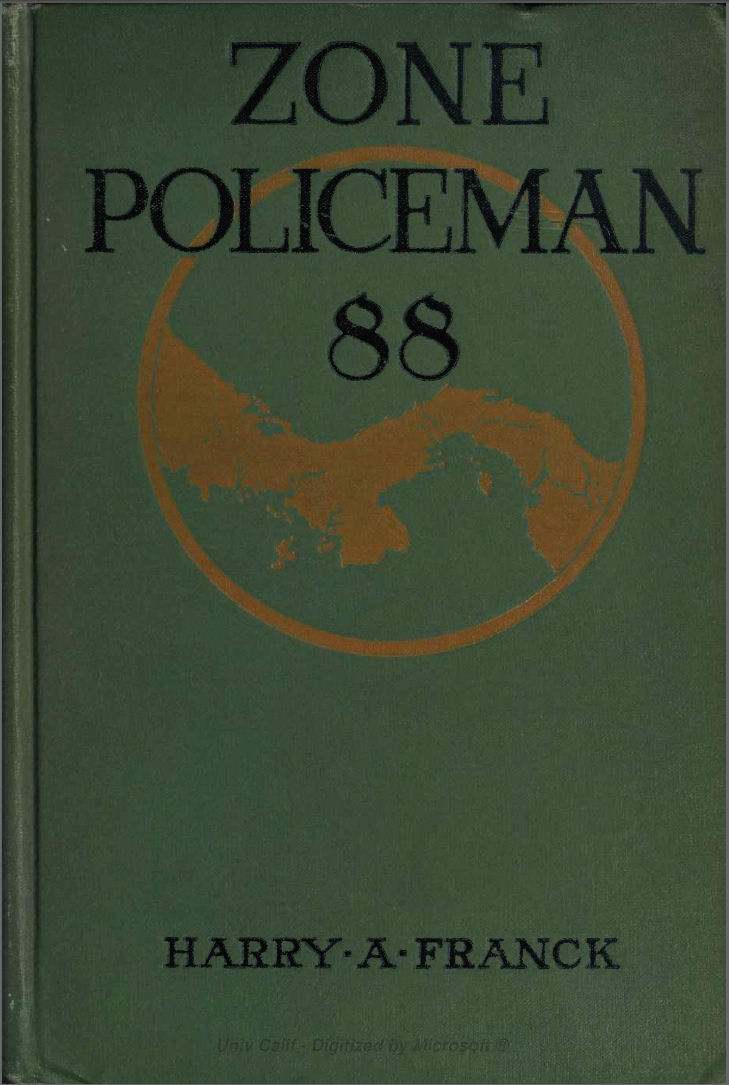
- Cover of a 1913 edition
- Author: Harry A. Franck
- Language: English
- Subject: Panama Canal Zone
- Genre: Travelogue
- Publisher: 1913 (The Century Company)
- Publication place: United States
- Pages: 312
- Preceded by: Vagabond Journey Around the World
- Followed by: Three Months Afoot in Spain

Zone Policeman 88: A Close Range Study of the Panama Canal and Its Workers is a non-fiction book written by Harry A. Franck and published in 1913. Franck, a travel writer who had produced a highly successful 1910 travelogue, Vagabond Journey Around the World, took a position as a police officer in the Panama Canal Zone, reporting his experiences and observations in a book that proved, like his debut, popular. The book was generally critically well received.

== Overview ==
Franck, who had supported himself as a teacher prior to the success of his first travelogue, took a three-month job on the Canal Zone Police force, helping to patrol the workers assigned to the Panama Canal Zone. There, he helped keep peace as plain-clothesman but also served administrative duties, including as a census enumerator.

== Reception ==
The book was generally critically well received. The American Review of Reviews lauded the author as "a born story-teller and a born tramp", the combination of which gives "something worth while" to the reader; "In this book, which is full of speaking pictures, the reader gets not only a picture of the Canal Zone as seen by the curious tourist in a hurry, but the life and spirit of all the great engineering country." According to the New York Times, it gave "a new view of the whole [Panama Canal] affair that is piquantly human." The Carnegie Library of Pittsburgh, in its review, agreed that "his account is chiefly notable for its intimate picture of the men who handle the steam shovels, tamp the dynamite cartridges, build the concrete locks, and run the never-ending procession of earth trains. He has seen them under all conditions, and his observations, tinged as they always are, with genuine humor, strike a human note, especially when he recounts his experiences among the West Indians."

By contrast, Preferred List of Books for Township and High School Libraries in the State of Michigan described the book as "entertaining", but said that "[h]is impressions are very definite, his experiences well told, but as a whole, the book makes a rather slight contribution and has little if any permanent value."
