= Paul Mooney (writer) =

American journalist (1904–1939)

- Born: November 4, 1904; Washington, D.C., U.S.
- Disappeared: March 24, 1939 (aged 34); Pacific Ocean, approximately 31.10°N 155.00°E
- Occupations: Freelance journalist; photojournalist; writer
- Relatives: James Mooney (father)

Paul James Mooney (November 4, 1904 – presumed dead after March 24, 1939) was an American freelance journalist and photojournalist. He is best remembered for his collaborative work with adventurer and travel writer Richard Halliburton. Mooney and Halliburton were lost at sea in the Pacific Ocean in March 1939.

== Early life ==
Born in Washington, D.C., on November 4, 1904, Mooney was the son of Ione Lee Gaut Mooney (died 1955), an important figure in the Daughters of the American Revolution, and James Mooney, an ethnologist for the Smithsonian Institution and an expert on American Indian lore such as the Ghost Dance.

In 1923 or 1924, Mooney boarded a freighter bound for Salonika and Constantinople. The Ottoman Empire had recently collapsed, and Mustafa Kemal Atatürk was emerging as the leader of the secular Republic of Turkey. Returning to the United States, Mooney considered school at Catholic University before seeking his fortune in New York City, where he wrote advertising copy for a travel agency. In 1927, he published "Seven Poems" verses which, according to his biographer Gerry Max, "speak of adventure, unrequited love, triumphant love, carnal love, death, and burial." The following year he lived briefly in Paris; he also sojourned in a community in Brittany and visited Berlin, Germany.

Mooney, though aloof by nature and often temperamental, made friends easily; these included, besides the artists, Leslie Powell and Don Forbes, writer and raconteur Eugene MacCown (who, besides a famous portrait of shipping heiress Nancy Cunard, painted a portrait of Mooney), and possibly writer René Crevel. Like his father, an ardent Irish patriot, he sought out writer James Joyce and others of the expatriate Irish community living in Paris.

== Life in Los Angeles ==
About 1929, Mooney established himself in the Los Angeles area. Soon to become a fixture among the new wave of aviation promoters and fliers, he mingled with oilman Erle P. Halliburton, actor Ramon Novarro, aviator Moye W. Stephens, and aviator Florence "Pancho" Barnes. Also befriending him was Harry Hay, later a gay activist, with whom he argued politics and human rights issues.

About 1930, Mooney met travel writer Richard Halliburton, cousin of Erle and author of the best-selling The Royal Road to Romance (1925), The Glorious Adventure (1927), and New Worlds To Conquer (1929). The last, and most gifted, in a line of secretaries Halliburton had taken on over his career, Mooney most notably assisted him in preparing for publication. The Flying Carpet (1932) and Seven League Boots (1935)—these are among the last great road narratives of the classic travel book era—and the two Books of Marvels, arguably the two most influential young adult travel books ever written, which were issued in two volumes, The Occident [1937] and The Orient [1938]). Independently, Mooney assisted ex-Nazi Kurt Ludecke in writing the 833-page I Knew Hitler (1937), an early study of the Fuehrer and "a masterpiece of political self-vindication".

In 1937, when Halliburton decided to settle down in Laguna Beach, California, Mooney suggested to him that he contract William Alexander Levy, a recent graduate of the New York University School of Architecture, to design and build a house for him. Called Hangover House because it stood on a ridge some 600 feet (180 m) above the Pacific Ocean and precipitously overlooked Aliso Canyon, Mooney managed its construction. Of concrete and steel, the innovative house included such features as a dumbwaiter, heatilator, and a bastion-like retaining wall. Today, architectural historians consider it among the early masterpieces of modern residential housing design in Southern California.

== Sea Dragon expedition ==
In 1938, Mooney, as Halliburton's mimeograph operator, accompanied the travel writer to China following a plan to sail a Wenchow-styled Chinese junk christened the Sea Dragon across the Pacific from Hong Kong to the Golden Gate International Exposition in San Francisco. The Letters From The Sea Dragon, written with Halliburton (who alone signed them), offer eye-witness reports of the expanding Japanese presence in the Pacific. Sent to subscribers whose fees helped finance the expedition, only four of a projected seven of these letters were written. Mooney also assisted Halliburton in preparing for the San Francisco News and the Bell Syndicate the more generally circulated articles, a projected fifteen in number, which were called collectively The Log of the Sea Dragon.

The Sea Dragon sailed eastward on March 4, 1939. Approximately 1,900 miles (3,100 km) southeast of Yokohama, on March 23, 1939, the ship headed into a typhoon. Neither the ship nor its crew was ever seen again. Efforts by the SS President Coolidge and, later, the US Navy to locate the Sea Dragon were met with failure.

== See also ==
- List of people who disappeared mysteriously at sea
