= SS Richard Halliburton =

World War II Liberty ship of the United States

History

United States
- Name: Richard Halliburton
- Namesake: Richard Halliburton
- Owner: War Shipping Administration (WSA)
- Operator: Isbrandstsen Steamship Co., Inc.
- Ordered: as type (EC2-S-C1) hull, MC hull 2323
- Builder: J.A. Jones Construction, Panama City, Florida
- Cost: $645,260
- Yard number: 64
- Way number: 5
- Laid down: 31 August 1944
- Launched: 10 October 1944
- Sponsored by: Mrs. Evelyn Marshall
- Completed: 25 October 1944
- Identification: Call sign: KTEF
- Fate: Placed in National Defense Reserve Fleet, Wilmington, North Carolina, 10 March 1948; Sold for scrapping, 14 March 1961, withdrawn from the fleet, 31 May 1961

General characteristics
- Class & type: Liberty ship; type EC2-S-C1, standard
- Tonnage: 10,865 LT DWT; 7,176 GRT
- Displacement: 3,380 long tons (3,434 t) (light); 14,245 long tons (14,474 t) (max)
- Length: 441 feet 6 inches (135 m) oa; 416 feet (127 m) pp; 427 feet (130 m) lwl
- Beam: 57 feet (17 m)
- Draft: 27 ft 9.25 in (8.4646 m)
- Installed power: 2 × Oil fired 450 °F (232 °C) boilers, operating at 220 psi (1,500 kPa); 2,500 hp (1,900 kW)
- Propulsion: 1 × triple-expansion steam engine, (manufactured by Filer and Stowell, Milwaukee, Wisconsin); 1 × screw propeller
- Speed: 11.5 knots (21.3 km/h; 13.2 mph)
- Capacity: 562,608 cubic feet (15,931 m^{3}) (grain); 499,573 cubic feet (14,146 m^{3}) (bale)
- Complement: 38–62 USMM; 21–40 USNAG
- Armament: Varied by ship; Bow-mounted 3-inch (76 mm)/50-caliber gun; Stern-mounted 4-inch (102 mm)/50-caliber gun; 2–8 × single 20-millimeter (0.79 in) Oerlikon anti-aircraft (AA) cannons and/or, 2–8 × 37-millimeter (1.46 in) M1 AA guns

SS Richard Halliburton was a Liberty ship built in the United States during World War II. She was named after Richard Halliburton, an American traveler, adventurer, and author.

== Construction ==
Richard Halliburton was laid down on 31 August 1944, under a Maritime Commission (MARCOM) contract, MC hull 2323, by J.A. Jones Construction, Panama City, Florida; sponsored by Mrs. Evelyn Marshall, wife of regional MARCOM auditor, and launched on 10 October 1944.

== History ==
She was allocated to Isbrandstsen Steamship Co. Inc., 23 September 1944. On 10 March 1946, she was laid up in the National Defense Reserve Fleet, Wilmington, North Carolina.

She was sold for scrapping, 14 March 1961, to Union Minerals and Alloys Corporation, for $48,139.89. As a consequence of this sale, she was withdrawn from the Reserve fleet, 31 May 1961.

== Bibliography ==
- "Jones Construction, Panama City FL". www.ShipbuildingHistory.com. 13 October 2010.
- Maritime Administration. "Richard Halliburton". Ship History Database Vessel Status Card. U.S. Department of Transportation, Maritime Administration. This article incorporates text from this source, which is in the public domain.
- Davies, James (May 2004). "Specifications (As-Built)" (PDF). p. 23.
- "SS Richard Halliburton".
