= Elly Beinhorn =

German pilot (1907–2007)

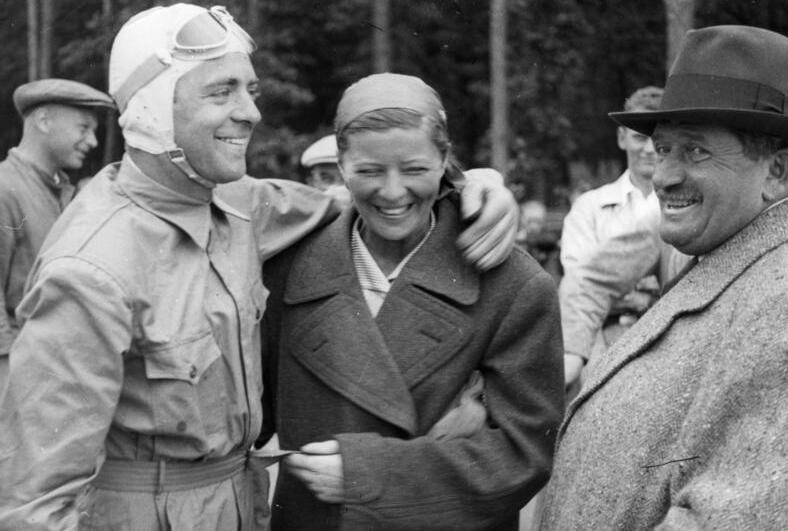
- Elly Beinhorn (center) with Bernd Rosemeyer and Ferdinand Porsche
- Born: 30 May 1907; Hanover, Germany
- Died: 28 November 2007 (aged 100); Ottobrunn, Germany
- Occupation: Pilot
- Spouse(s): Bernd Rosemeyer (1909–1938) (m. 1936–1938) (his death); Dr. Karl Wittman (m.1941)

Elly Beinhorn (30 May 1907 – 28 November 2007) was a pioneering German female aircraft pilot.

== Life ==
=== Early life ===
She was born in Hanover, Germany on 30 May 1907. In 1928, she attended a lecture by famed aviator Hermann Köhl, who had recently completed a historic east–west Atlantic crossing. This lecture is described as the spark that ignited her interest in aviation.

At just 21 years old, with funds from a small inheritance (against the wishes of her parents) she moved to Spandau in Berlin where she took flying lessons, at Berlin-Staaken airport, under the tutelage of instructor Otto Thomsen. She soon made her solo flight in a small Klemm KL-20. With her money running out, it was suggested that she give aerobatic displays on the weekends. She found this financially rewarding, but personally unsatisfying.

=== Long-distance flights ===
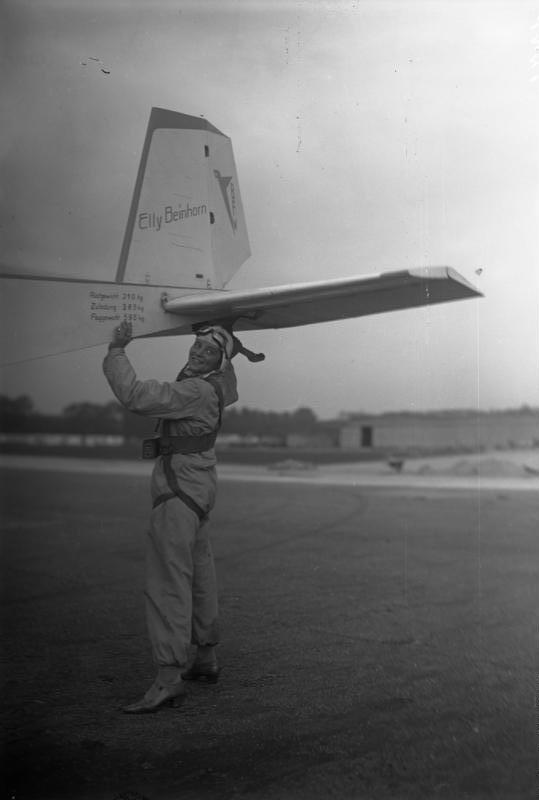
Elly Beinhorn 1933

Long-distance flying was her real passion and in 1931 she seized the opportunity to fly to Portuguese Guinea (now Guinea-Bissau) West Africa on a scientific expedition. On the return journey, engine failure resulted in a crash-landing in the Sahara. With the help of nomadic Tuareg tribesmen, Beinhorn joined a camel caravan to Timbuktu. She subsequently returned to the crash site to recover parts of the plane. Word of her plight reached the French authorities and they sent a military two-seater plane to collect her.

In April 1931, fully recovered, she flew back to Berlin to a warm reception from the crowds. Soon after this, she embarked on another flight, but her Klemm monoplane developed mechanical problems near Bushire, Persia. She found Moye Stephens. another pilot, in Bushire, who helped her fix the Klemm. Stephens and travel-adventure writer Richard Halliburton were flying around the world in a Stearman C-3B biplane that they called the "Flying Carpet". She accompanied them on part of their flight, including the trip to Mount Everest. She flew on to Bali, and eventually Australia. In the process, she became the second woman to fly solo from Europe to Australia, after Amy Johnson. The foreword of her book, Flying Girl (1935), was written by Richard Halliburton (whose English publisher, as hers, was Geoffrey Bles); it includes a photo of Stephens repairing her plane. Barbara H. Schultz' Flying Carpets, Flying Wings – The Biography of Moye Stephens (2011) contains Stephens' own account of their meeting which was first introduced in Halliburton's bestselling The Flying Carpet (1932).

Having landed in Darwin, Northern Territory of Australia, she continued to Sydney, arriving in March 1932. Her plane was dismantled and shipped to New Zealand, then Panama where it was reassembled. There she resumed her flight, following the western coast of South America. She was presented with a medal in Peru. An ill-advised trip across the Andes followed. The plane was dismantled once more in Brazil and shipped to Germany. Beinhorn arrived in Berlin in June 1932.

Now famous but with a debt of 15,000 marks or more, she was surprised to be awarded the Hindenburg Cup, worth 10,000 marks, and several other monetary awards from the German aeronautical industry which enabled her to continue her career. She continued to write articles and sell photographs of her travels to raise funds.

Free of debt, she departed for Africa in a Heinkel He 71, flying along the east coast, then back via the west coast.

The following year, Beinhorn shipped the plane to Panama, then flew through Mexico and California before crossing the United States to Washington DC and Miami. She and the plane returned to Germany by ship, arriving in January 1935.

=== Bernd Rosemeyer ===
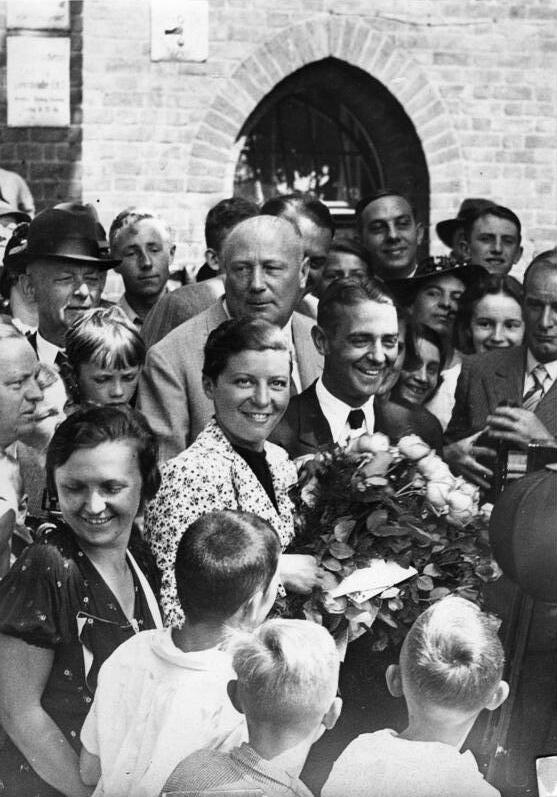
Elly Beinhorn and Bernd Rosemeyer at their wedding

On 29 September 1935, Elly attended the Czechoslovakian Grand Prix, in Brno, Czechoslovakia, at the invitation of Auto Union (she was in the country on a lecture tour). She congratulated the winner, Bernd Rosemeyer, who seemed smitten with her. They were married on 13 July 1936. A celebrity couple – an adventurous aviator and the fearless racing driver – they were the toast of Nazi Germany. Bernd later became a member of the SS.

They had a son, Bernd Jr., in November 1937. Ten weeks after his birth, his father was killed while attempting a speed record in his Auto Union Streamliner. As a national hero he was mourned by much of Germany. Elly received condolences from prominent Nazis, including Adolf Hitler, but requested a simple, non-political funeral ceremony. These wishes were ignored and several Nazis gave speeches at the graveside. Some accounts suggest that Elly "threatened to walk out of the self-serving funeral orations being proposed".

=== Second marriage and post-war life ===
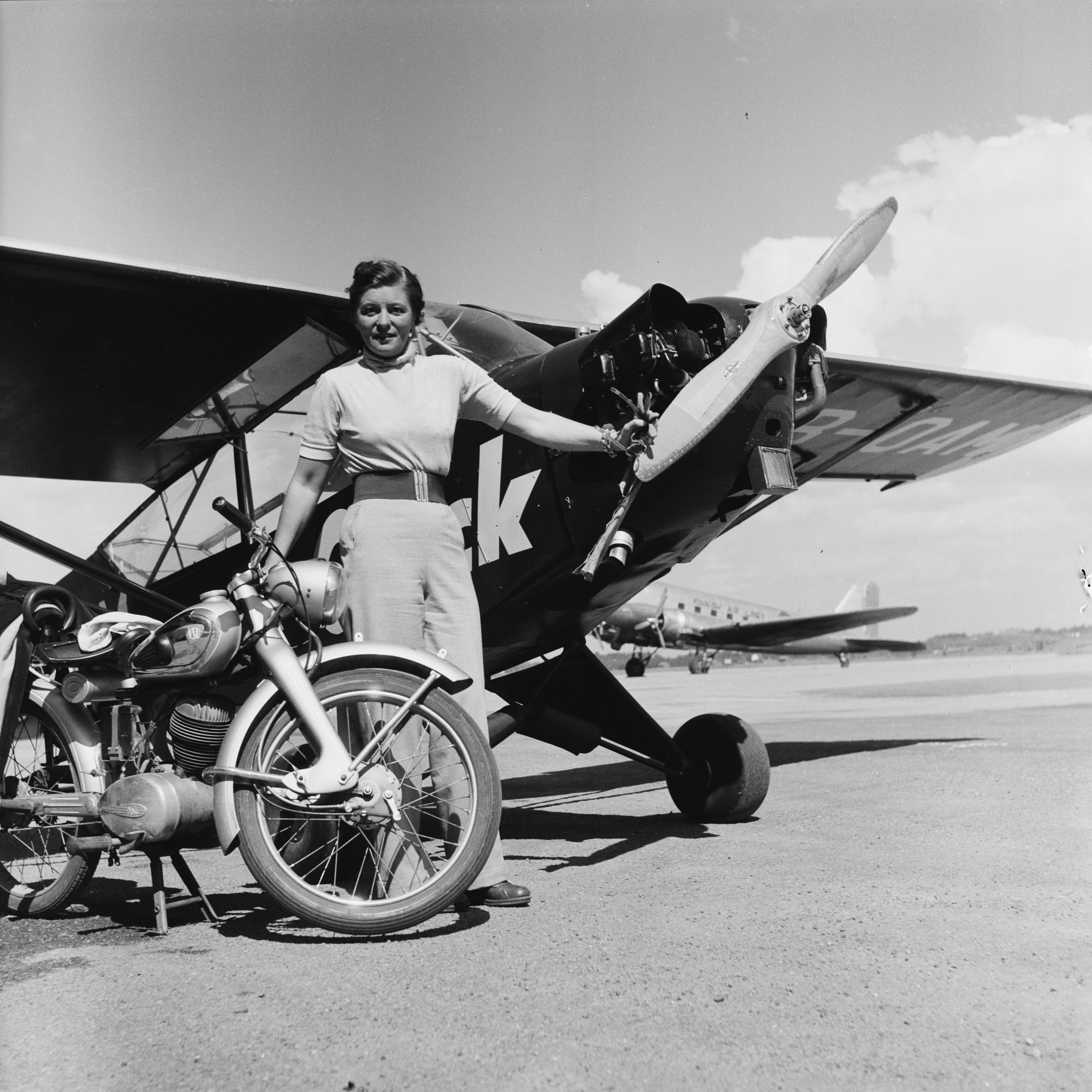
Woman in Helsinki 1952 Summer Olympics. The plane in the background is Elly Beinhorn's Piper J-3C-65 Cub with the designation HB-OAM, and the description of the photo indicates that it is most likely her.

In 1941, Elly married Dr. Karl Wittman and they had a daughter, Stephanie.

After World War II she briefly took up gliding due to the ban on powered flight in Germany. She soon moved to Switzerland to continue flying planes.

In 1979, at the age of 72, she surrendered her pilot's licence.

=== Later years and death ===
In her later years, Elly Beinhorn lived in Ottobrunn, Bavaria, near Munich. Her son, Dr. Bernd Rosemeyer, lives in the same area and enjoyed a successful career as an orthopaedist. He married Countess Michaela von Castell-Ruedenhausen, who died 8 August 2011, and they had two children.

Elly Beinhorn died on 28 November 2007, at the age of 100.

== Publications ==
- Beinhorn, Elly Alleinflug: Mein Leben. Herbig, 2007, ISBN 978-3776625226
- Probst, Ernst Königinnen der Lüfte: Biographien berühmter Fliegerinnen wie Elly Beinhorn, Hanna Reitsch, Amelia Earhart, Jacqueline Auriol und Valentina Tereschkowa. Diplomica Verlag, 2014, ISBN 978-3842872967
- Alt, John H. Don't Die in Bed: The Brief, Intense Life of Richard Halliburton. Atlanta: Quincunx Press, 2013. Chapters on Elly Beinhorn.
- Chris Nixon & Elly Beinhorn-Rosemeyer: "Rosemeyer!", Transport Bookman Publications 1989, ISBN 0-85184-046-9
- Beinhorn, Elly, Flying Girl (Geoffrey Bles, London, 1935).
- Halliburton, Richard, The Flying Carpet (Bobbs-Merrill, Indianapolis and New York, 1932).
- Max, Gerry, Horizon Chasers – The Adventures of Richard Halliburton and Paul Mooney (McFarland Publishers, Inc., Jefferson, North Carolina, 2007).
- Schultz, Barbara H., Flying Carpets, Flying Wings – The Biography of Moye Stephens (PlaneMercantile, 2011).
- Frilling, Christoph: Die Pilotin und der Rennfahrer – Elly Beinhorn und Bernd Rosemeyer auf Gratwanderung im Nationalsozialismus. Verlag W. Dietrich, Reinhardtsgrimma 2009, ISBN 978-3-933500-10-6.
- Laurence Arthur Rickels: Into Africa. In: Nazi Psychoanalysis – Vol. 2. University of Minnesota Press, Minneapolis 2002, ISBN 978-0-8166-3698-3, p. 82–87.
- Commire, Anne: Beinhorn, Elly (1907–). In: Women in World History: A Biographical Encyclopedia. Gale, 2000, ISBN 978-0-7876-4061-3.
- Dimitrova-Moeck, Svoboda: Women travel abroad 1925-1932 : Maria Leitner, Erika Mann, Marieluise Fleisser, and Elly Beinhorn : women's travel writing from the Weimar Republic. Weidler, Berlin 2009, ISBN 978-3-89693-534-2, p. 209–243.
