= Noël Sullivan =

American arts patron and philanthropist

- Sullivan, 1940s
- Born: Reginald Noël Sullivan; 25 December 1890; San Francisco, California, U.S.
- Died: 15 September 1956 (aged 65); Carmel Valley Village, California, U.S.
- Resting place: Carmelite Monastery Cemetery
- Education: St. Ignatius College Preparatory; Santa Clara College
- Occupations: Singer, art patron
- Relatives: James D. Phelan (uncle)

Reginald Noël Sullivan (December 25, 1890 – September 15, 1956) was a wealthy American concert singer, philanthropist, and patron of the arts, who is remembered for entertaining performers, artists and writers in his opulent residence on Hyde Street, San Francisco. He befriended many African Americans, providing support for their welfare.

== Early life and education ==
Born in San Francisco on 25 December 1890, Noël Sullivan was the son of Alice Phelan and Francis "Frank" J. Sullivan whose father, the Irish immigrant John Sullivan, had arrived in California in 1844. He was given the name Noël (French for Christmas) as he had been born on Christmas Day. He was the nephew of James D. Phelan who was a banker and politician serving as mayor of San Francisco and Senator.

Sullivan was brought up in an affluent, influential home, attending first St. Ignatius College and then Santa Clara College. Although not academically inclined, he was interested in music, developing his singing talents abroad and performing as an amateur singer. For a time, he had a home in Paris. In World War I he served with the American Field Service as an ambulance driver. During this period, he wrote a number of letters to his aunt, Mary Louise Phelan (1896–1930).

== Adult life ==
Following serious problems with his father's health, in 1925 Sullivan returned to San Francisco to take care of him in the family home on 2323 Hyde Street. The house had initially been acquired by his mother for the Carmelite nuns who later moved to Santa Clara. He lived in the house for many years, frequently entertaining friends from the world of art and literature. He developed an excellent relationship with his household staff, most of whom were African Americans. These included his housekeeper, his cook, and his chauffeur. He later was a supporter of Langston Hughes.

In the early 1930s, Noël supported the music scene in San Francisco, gaining a reputation as an adept amateur concert singer. He facilitated the career of young Soprano Dorothy Warenskjold, among others.

As chairman of the California branch of the American League to Abolish Capital Punishment, he also campaigned vigorously for the abolition of capital punishment.

As a result of depressed markets in the 1930s, Sullivan increasingly experienced financial difficulties despite being an heir of his wealthy uncle, the politician James D. Phelan, who died in 1930. Sullivan had a 30-year-long romantic friendship with actor Ramon Novarro (1899–1968). At Senator Phelan's funeral, Sullivan accompanied Novarro, who sang, on the organ. Richard Halliburton, a family friend, was in attendance.

Sullivan maintained close relationships to his family. After the death of his married sister Gladys S. Doyle in 1933, he helped bring up her five children. As a result of his strong affection for his sister Ada, a Carmelite nun known as Agnes of Jesus, he provided support for the monasteries in Santa Clara, Carmel and San Diego while establishing an additional community in Berkeley.

From 1939, Sullivan lived in Hollow Hills Farms in Carmel Valley where he continued to entertain his artistic friends as well as participating in the Carmel Bach Festivals. He also played the organ at the Carmel Mission and headed the Carmel Music Society.

In 1955, Sullivan was instrumental in creating and supporting the Monterey Institute of Foreign Studies (MIFS). He is recognized as a cofounder of MIFS, which is today a graduate school of Middlebury College.

Sullivan died of a heart attack in Carmel Valley on 15 September 1956.
