= Harry A. Franck =

American travel writer (1881–1962)

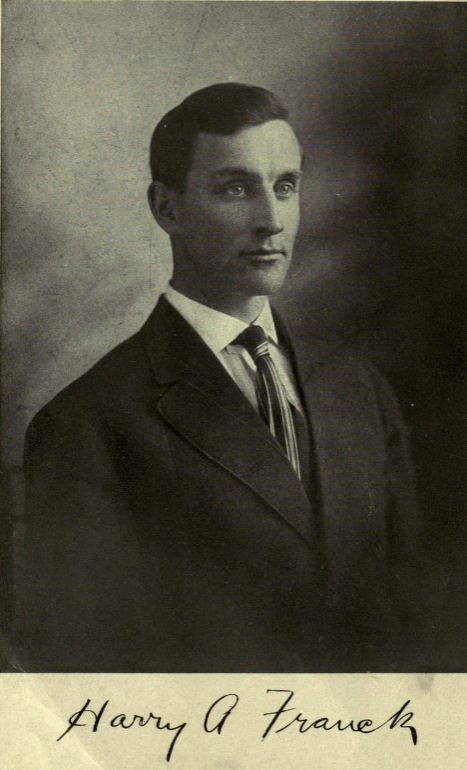
Photo and signature of Harry A. Franck

Harry Alverson Franck (29 June 1881 – 18 April 1962) was an American travel writer during the first half of the 20th century.

== Biography ==
Harry Alverson Franck was born on June 29, 1881, in Munger, Michigan, the eldest of three children of the blacksmith Charles Adolph Franck (1856–1933) and Lillie Evelyn Wilsey (1861–1955), herself the daughter of a local blacksmith, Peter Alverson Wilsey (1827–1915), and his wife Almira Lincoln Graham (1829–1907). Harry's father Charles was born in Schwerin, Mecklenburg, Germany, but at less than a year old came to the United States with his elder sister and his parents, Heinrich Franck (1823–1877) and Wilhelmina Christina Magdalena Kort (1829–1912), who remained in contact with family in Schwerin; in the course of his travels, Harry visited these relatives at least twice, detailing these visits in Vagabonding Through Changing Germany, but identifying his relatives only as "a family distantly related to my own".

In the summer of 1900, following his freshman year at the University of Michigan, Harry Franck set out with only $3.18 in his pocket to see Europe. He worked his way across the Atlantic on a cattle boat, visited England and France, and got back to Ann Arbor two weeks after classes had started. While an undergraduate, he bet a fellow student that he could travel around the world without money, and after a year of teaching, proceeded to do so. He spent sixteen months circling the globe, working to earn money along the way and performing feats such as walking across the Malay peninsula. His book, A Vagabond Journey Around the World (1910) sold well enough to encourage him to continue his travels, following five years teaching in two private schools and in the Springfield, Massachusetts Technical High School.

Franck had many adventures, not all of them pleasant, but all described in his plain, somewhat sardonic style, which was the antithesis of the highly romantic prose of other popular travel writers, such as Richard Halliburton. All his books except Winter Journey Through the Ninth (see below), are out of print, but some are now in the public domain and freely available online, and all are readily available secondhand.

His books intimately recorded life as it was lived in the societies he visited, at a time when many of them were changing rapidly under the influence of industrialization. As historical sources they are of value for their pen-portraits of figures such as the "Irish Buddhist" U Dhammaloka. Young readers may find it hard to believe that the societies were true descriptions of situations of less than a century ago, but they ring true in the context of other autobiographical writings and even the fiction of those days and of many decades after. His observations and much of his wording inevitably mirror the racist attitudes and religious prejudices of his time, but it is appropriate to note from incidents retailed in works such as Zone Policeman 88, chapters II, VIII, X and elsewhere, that Franck's personal attitudes towards everyone were basically humane, unpretentious, and courteous, if informal. His tone becomes subtly acrid in retailing examples of explicit racism or other forms of inter-group insensitivity. His unconscious remarks and use of words that nowadays are unacceptable in civilised speech are mainly of interest in revealing the differences between the conventions of the day and those of say, the late 20th century.

In Wandering in Northern China (1923), he visited Korea, which had been a Japanese colony since 1910. The first thing he noted was that Korea was virtually devoid of trees. The aristocracy had been stripped of their duties but were allowed to wear the unique attire of their rank, although many were living in poverty. Franck reported that the women "displayed to the public gaze exactly that portion of the torso which the women of most nations take pains to conceal."

In the same book he reported on a visit to the northern Chinese city of Harbin, which at the time of writing (1923) contained a large population of refugee Russian aristocracy. He reported that the refugees held formal gatherings every Saturday night, complete with formal dress, although most of them were destitute. A former Russian aristocrat approached the director of the YMCA whom Franck was visiting to ask for some food; the director told him he would be welcome to lunch in exchange for cutting the grass. The Russian apologized but said he was unable to comply—manual labor was declasse—and departed, unfed.

In Zone Policeman 88 (1913), Franck worked as a police officer in the Panama Canal Zone and assisting in the census of its citizens. In Vagabonding Down the Andes (1917), he tells of his trip walking the spine of the Andes, traveling with a camera and a revolver, but without a blanket. He paid for his return trip by selling Edison phonographs. In Vagabonding Through Changing Germany (1920) he reported the turmoil in the aftermath of World War I. He even traveled through the Soviet Union in 1935, not without difficulty, and recorded his impressions in A Vagabond in Sovietland (1935).

In 1938 Franck was 57 and began to travel by air, which was still a novelty at that time. He wrote Sky Roaming Above Two Continents in 1938 and The Lure of Alaska in 1939.

When he was 61 years old, Franck obtained a commission as a Major in the Army Air Force (having served as a lieutenant in the cavalry in World War I) and served with the Ninth Air Force in France in the closing days of World War II, where the fighting was still going on. He reported vividly on the devastated conditions in eastern France. A nearby fortress had been bypassed by the Americans but was still manned by a German garrison. The Germans fired the same number of rounds from their cannon every night at the same time; the Germans, he was told, weren't aiming at anything, they were just following orders not to surrender. Winter Journey Through the Ninth was not accepted for publication at the time because publishers felt the market for war memoirs was glutted. It was privately published by the Franck family in 2000.

Harry Franck married Rachel Latta (1892–1986), a Philadelphian working as a secretary to a correspondent and a volunteer in the US army hospital whom he met in Paris, in 1919. She eventually offered her own point of view on their subsequent travels in her 1939 book, I Married a Vagabond. The couple had five children, all born in different places, but made their home life in New Hope, Pennsylvania, where Harry Franck died of a stroke in 1962.

== Works ==
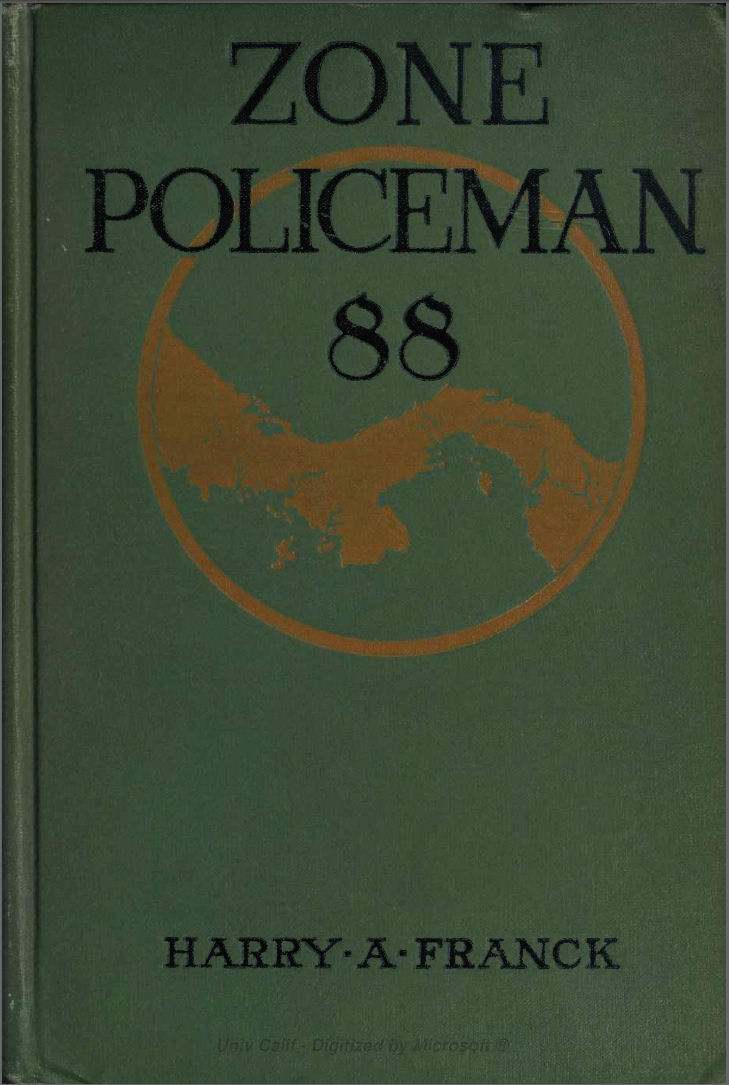
Book cover, Zone Policeman 88 (1913)

- A Vagabond Journey Around the World (1910)
- Four Months Afoot in Spain (1911)
- Zone Policeman 88 (1913)
- Tramping Through Mexico, Guatemala, and Honduras (1916)
- Vagabonding Down the Andes (1917)
- Working my Way Around the World (1918—Lena Franck's rewriting of the 1910 Vagabond Journey)
- Vagabonding Through Changing Germany (1920)
- Roaming Through the West Indies (1920)
- Under the palm-tree of Haiti (1920 pamphlet)
- Working North from Patagonia (1921)
- Wandering in Northern China (1923)
- Glimpses of Japan and Formosa (1924)
- Roving Through Southern China (1925)
- East of Siam (1926)
- All About Going Abroad (1927)
- The Japanese Empire: Geographical Reader (1927)
- China: Geographical Reader (1927)
- Mexico and Central America: Geographical Reader (1927)
- South America: Geographical Reader (1927)
- The Fringe of the Moslem World (1928)
- Treasures of the Holy Sepulcher (1928)
- I Discover Greece (1929)
- Marco Polo, Junior: The True Story of an Imaginary American Boy's Travel-Adventures All Over China (1929)
- A Scandinavian Summer (1930)
- Foot-Loose in the British Isles (1932)
- Trailing Cortez Through Mexico (1935)
- A Vagabond in Sovietland (1935)
- Roaming in Hawaii (1937)
- Sky Roaming Above Two Continents (1938)
- The Lure of Alaska (1939)
- The Pan American Highway; From the Rio Grande to the Canal Zone (1940)
- Rediscovering South America (1943)
- Santo Domingo, the Land of bullet-holes (1959)
- Winter Journey Through the Ninth (2001)

Some of Franck's works have been translated into German, Chinese, Spanish, Japanese, Slovak, and Czech. The Geographical Readers were a series partially based on his earlier works.
