= Hangover House =

House in Laguna Beach, California

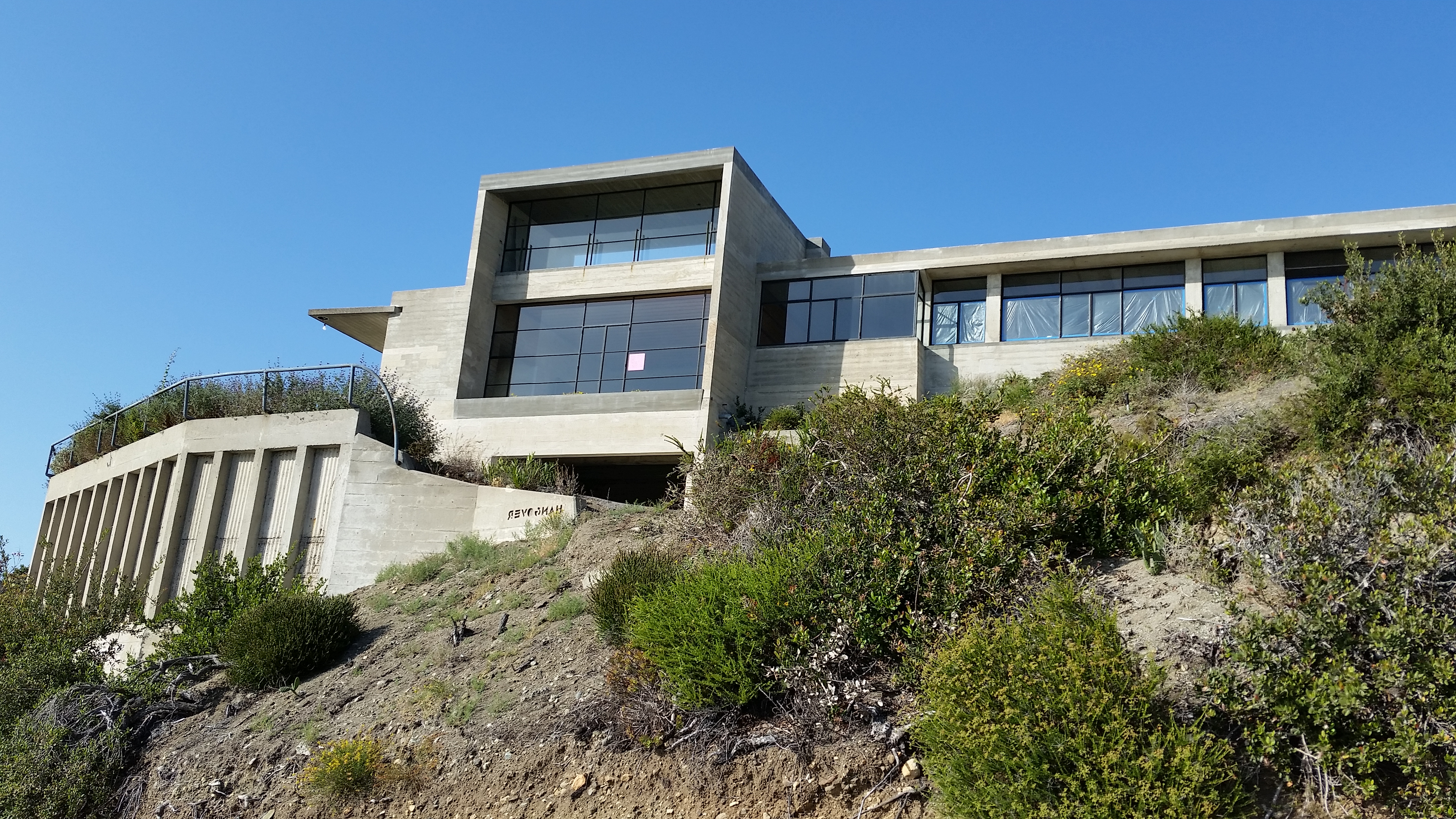
- Hangover House, from Ceanothus Drive (2016)

- Location within southern California Location within California
- Alternative names: Halliburton House

General information
- Architectural style: California Modernism / Brutalist
- Location: Laguna Beach, California
- Coordinates: 33.509632°N 117.747628°W
- Construction started: 1937
- Completed: 1938
- Owner: Richard Halliburton (1937–39); Wallace Thompson Scott (1941–2004); Zolita Scott (2004–10); Mark Fudge (2014–)

Design and construction
- Architect: William Alexander Levy

Hangover House (also known as the Halliburton House) was designed and built by William Alexander Levy for his friend the travel writer Richard Halliburton. Halliburton had first spotted the ridgetop site while riding on horseback on the beach in 1930. In 1937, Halliburton stated he had purchased a house in Laguna Beach, California. Constructed in 1938 on a hilltop, the house, boasting commanding views of the Pacific Ocean and Aliso Canyon, was built with three bedrooms, one each for Halliburton, one for Paul Mooney, and one for Alexander himself, when visiting Hangover House. Paul Mooney, Halliburton’s intimate companion, secretary, editor, and principal literary collaborator, shared his household, travels, and plans for Hangover House. Halliburton reportedly spent US$36,000 (equivalent to $820,000 in 2025) on the purchase of the site and construction of the house.

== Design ==
Alexander drew upon European modern architecture and created flat-roofed boxes of concrete and glass. He hoped to create a house that, like the international modern spirit of Halliburton, soared above the clouds. Mies van der Rohe's work and his experimental concrete buildings of the 1920s, along with Le Corbusier's L'Esprit Nouveau Pavilion (1924–25) and his famous Villa Savoye (1928–29), may have influenced Alexander. Concrete and steel were the main materials used in its construction; the difficulty and expense of hauling materials and labor up the hill caused the construction cost to increase. Glass blocks currently form part of the wall along the gallery, though there is no evidence these sections are original. Alexander created the house’s approach and turnaround terrace with a 17-foot-high reinforced-concrete retaining wall, its concrete beams hooked back into the bedrock to stabilize the steep cut and support a level platform above.

According to Alexander’s later recollection, Ayn Rand visited Hangover House shortly after its completion and discussed architecture with him for her book The Fountainhead (1943). Rand's descriptions of the Heller House and other houses designed by the book's hero Howard Roark were believed by Alexander to be thinly disguised references to Hangover House. A representative of the Ayn Rand Institute reportedly stated that Rand “did not set foot in California” between 1934 and 1943 and that her papers contain no written evidence, including notes, linking her to William Alexander Levy or Hangover House.

=== The Name "Hangover House" ===
In a letter from Halliburton to his mother, Nelle, dated October 15, 1936, he described the name of the house: "I have thought of calling it Hangover House, because it overhangs the precipice."

== Owners ==
Halliburton and Mooney visited the construction site in May 1937; prior to starting the house, a road and retaining wall were built. Halliburton, Mooney, and the crew of the Chinese junk Sea Dragon were lost at sea in the Pacific Ocean during a typhoon in March 1939, shortly after the house was completed. Halliburton's parents announced plans to sell the house later that year and completed an auction in 1941, selling it to Col. Wallace Thompson Scott and his wife Zolite for $9,000; the Scott family was the sole bidder. Zolite Scott lived in the house until her death in 2004; the title passed to Zolita Scott, Wallace's daughter and a locally prominent real estate agent, who died in November 2010.

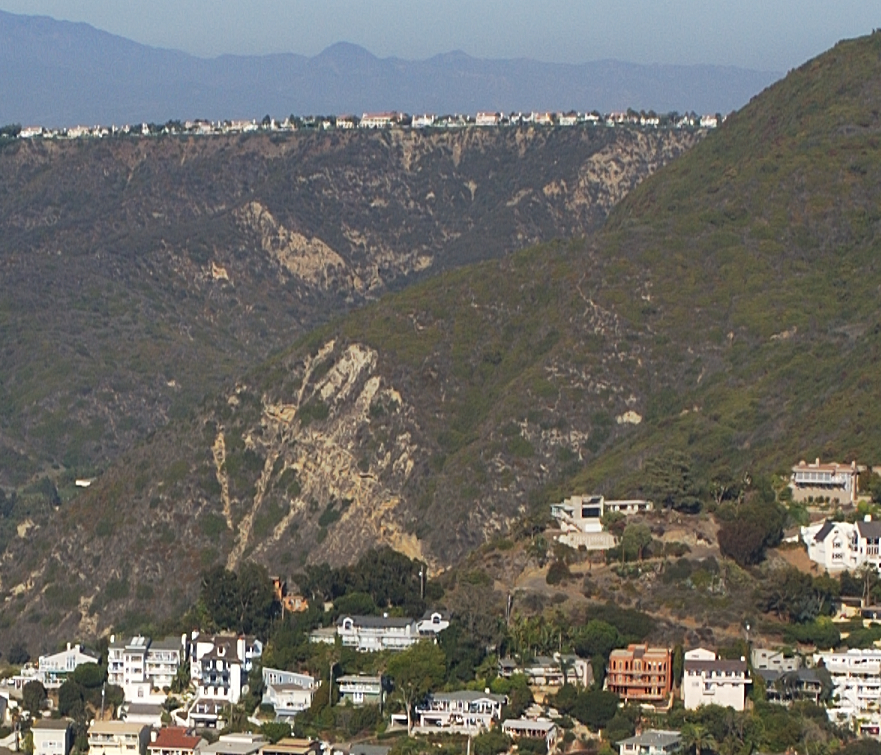
Aerial view of Hangover House, on the edge of Aliso Canyon (2002)

Located at 31172 Ceanothus Drive, the house was then sold in December 2011 for $3.2 million. The buyer, a local resident, paid $2.4 million for the house and $800,000 for an adjacent lot. It was estimated it would take $500,000 to restore the house, as the rebar used in the ferro-concrete structure had rusted. As of April 2012, construction was underway to rehabilitate the building after much neglect had resulted in severe structural deterioration, although work was held up by preservationist disputes.

The City of Laguna Beach has determined the property is eligible for the National Register in its General Plan.
