= Richard Halliburton =

American travel writer and adventurer (1900–1939)

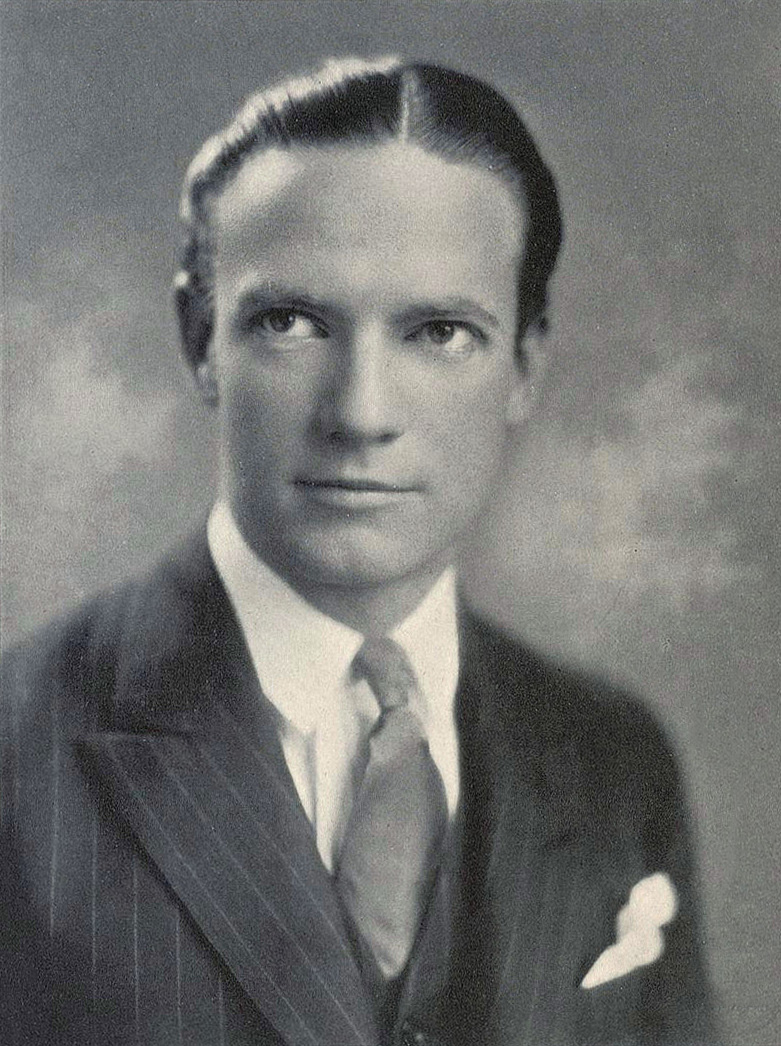
- Halliburton, c. 1933
- Born: January 9, 1900; Brownsville, Tennessee, U.S.
- Disappeared: March 24, 1939 (aged 39); Pacific Ocean, approximately 31.10°N 155.00°E
- Education: Memphis University School, Lawrenceville School, Princeton University
- Occupations: Travel writer; journalist; lecturer
- Relatives: Erle P. Halliburton (cousin)
- Writing career
- Period: 1925–1938
- Subjects: Travel literature, adventure, exploration
- Notable work: The Royal Road to Romance

Signature
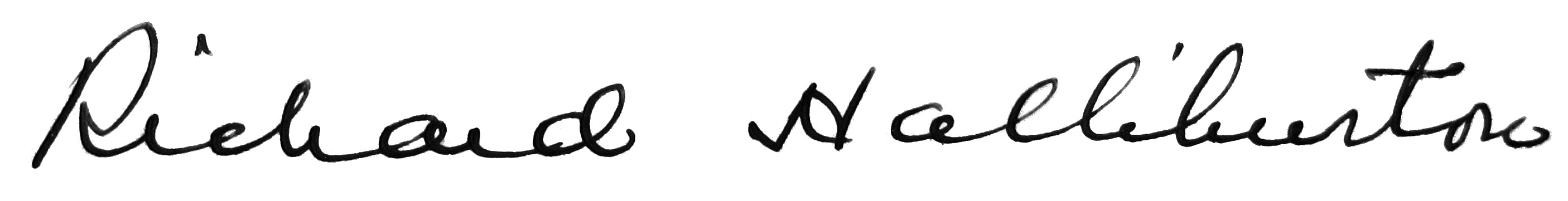

Richard Halliburton (January 9, 1900 – presumed dead after March 24, 1939) was an American travel writer and adventurer who, among numerous journeys, swam the length of the Panama Canal and paid the lowest toll in its history, 36 cents, in 1928. He disappeared at sea while attempting to sail the Chinese junk Sea Dragon across the Pacific Ocean from Hong Kong to the Golden Gate International Exposition in San Francisco, California.

== Early life and education ==
Richard Halliburton was born in Brownsville, Tennessee, to Wesley Halliburton, a civil engineer and real estate speculator, and Nelle Nance Halliburton. A brother, Wesley Jr., was born in 1903. The family moved to Memphis, where the brothers, who were not close, spent their childhood. Richard attended Memphis University School, where his favorite subjects were geography and history; he also showed promise as a violinist, and was a fair golfer and tennis player. In 1915, he developed a rapid heartbeat and spent some four months in bed before its symptoms were relieved. This included some time at the Battle Creek Sanitarium in Michigan, run by the eccentric and innovative John Harvey Kellogg, whose philosophy of care featured regular exercise, sound nutrition, and frequent enemas. In 1917, following an apparent bout of rheumatic fever, Wesley Jr., thought strong and in fine health, suddenly died.

At 5 ft 7 in (170 cm) and about 140 pounds (64 kg), Halliburton was never robust but would seldom complain of sickness or poor stamina. He graduated from the Lawrenceville School in 1917, where he was chief editor of The Lawrence. In 1921, he graduated from Princeton University, where he was on the editorial board of The Daily Princetonian and chief editor of The Princetonian Pictorial Magazine. He also attended courses in public speaking and considered a career as a lecturer.

== Career ==
=== "An even tenor" ===
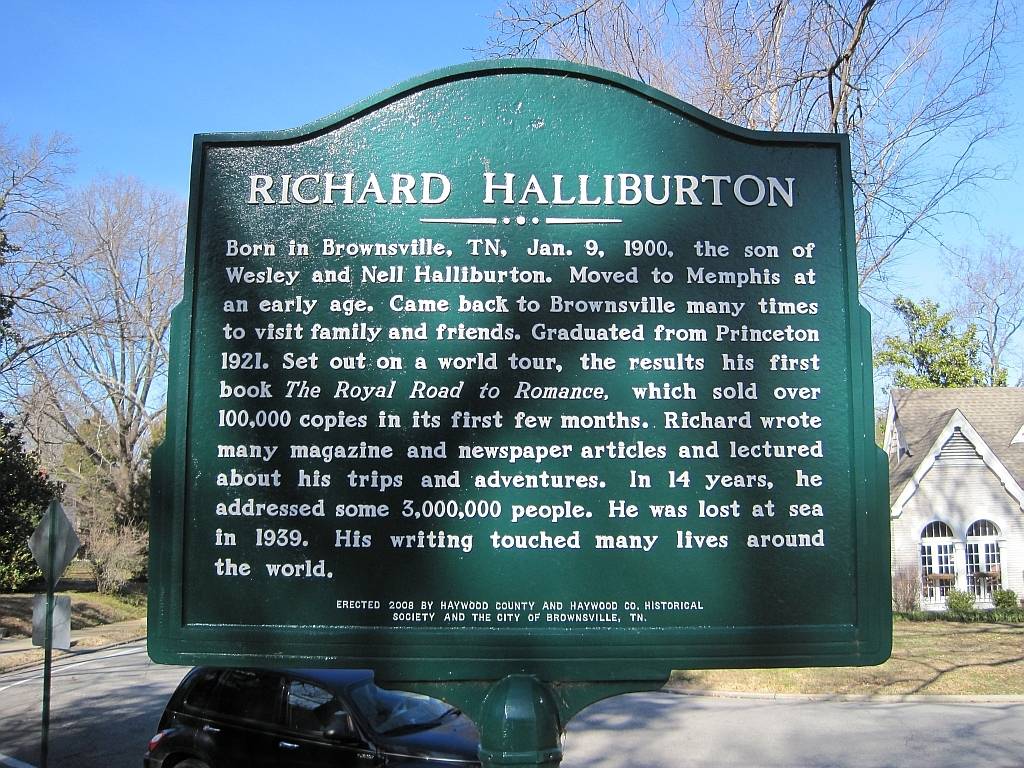
Historical marker for Richard Halliburton in Brownsville, Tennessee

Leaving college temporarily during 1919, Halliburton became an ordinary seaman and boarded the freighter Octorara that July, bound from New Orleans to England. He toured historic places in London and Paris, but soon returned to Princeton in early 1920 to finish his schooling. His trip inspired in him a lust for even more travel; seizing the day became his credo. The words of Oscar Wilde, who in works like The Picture of Dorian Gray enjoined experiencing the moment before it vanished, inspired Halliburton to reject marriage, family, a regular job, and conventional respectability as the obvious steps after graduation. He liked bachelorhood, youthful adventure, and the thrill of the unknown. To earn a living he intended to write about his adventures. He dedicated his first book to his Princeton roommates, "...whose sanity, consistency and respectability... drove [him] to this book".

Halliburton's father advised him to get the wanderlust out of his system, return to Memphis and adjust his life to "an even tenor" which for son Richard meant the humdrum, prosaic and dreary encased in a set routine:

"I hate that expression", Richard responded, expressing the view that distinguished his life-style, "and as far as I am able I intend to avoid that condition. When impulse and spontaneity fail to make my way uneven then I shall sit up nights inventing means of making my life as conglomerate and vivid as possible.... And when my time comes to die, I'll be able to die happy, for I will have done and seen and heard and experienced all the joy, pain and thrills—any emotion that any human ever had—and I'll be especially happy if I am spared a stupid, common death in bed.

He believed that his fortunes lay abroad, not at home: One's youth should not be wasted in idle domestic pursuits—nor in fulfilling expectations enjoined by others or by societal norms. Becoming a keynote of his philosophy was that young adults see the world beyond the horizon before they settle down into a set routine unbeknownst to the many choices in life a greater knowledge of that wider world offers.

=== Witness to the wedding of the emperor of China ===
In 1922, Halliburton witnessed the last ceremonial marriage of a Chinese Emperor, the wedding of Emperor Puyi to Empress Wanrong in Beijing. The Royal Family would be permanently expelled less than two years later. Halliburton wrote of the event in his memoir:

At four in the morning this gorgeous spectacle moved through the moonlit streets of Peking en-route to the prison-palace. The entire city was awake and the people thronged the line of march. A forest of pennants blazed and fluttered past...gold dragons on black silk, blue dragons on gold silk; and swaying lanterns, and gilded kiosques containing the bride’s ceremonial robes, and princes on horseback surrounded by their colorful retinues. There was more than enough music. Last of all came the bride’s sedan hung with yellow brocade, roofed with a great gold dragon, and borne along by sixteen noblemen. I followed close behind the shrouded chair, and wondered about the state of mind of the little girl inside. Headed straight for prison, she was on the point of surrendering forever the freedom she had hitherto enjoyed... The procession wound its way to the 'Gate of Propitious Destiny,' one of the entrances to the palace, and halted before it. Torches flared. There was subdued confusion and whispers. Mandarins and court officials hurried back and forth. Slowly, darkly, the great gates swung open,—I could look inside the courtyard and see the blazing avenue of lamps down which the procession would move up to the throne room where the emperor waited. Into the glitter and glamour of this 'Great Within' the trembling little girl, hidden in her flowered box, was carried. Then as I watched, the gates boomed shut and the princess became an empress.

— Richard Halliburton, The Royal Road to Romance, pp. 298–300

=== Lecturer and pioneer of adventure journalism ===
While Halliburton was attending Princeton, Field and Stream magazine paid him $150 for an article (equivalent to $2,410 in 2025). This initial success encouraged him to choose travel writing as a career. His fortunes changed when a representative of the Feakins Agency heard him deliver a talk, and soon Halliburton was given bookings for lectures. Despite a high-pitched voice and occasional discomfort on the details, Halliburton displayed such enthusiasm and recounted such vivid recreations of his often bizarre foreign encounters that he became popular with audiences. On the strength of his lecturing and increasing celebrity appeal, publisher Bobbs-Merrill, whose editor-in-chief David Laurance Chambers was also a Princeton graduate, accepted Halliburton's first book, The Royal Road to Romance (1925), which became a bestseller.

Two years later, Halliburton published The Glorious Adventure, which retraced Ulysses' adventures throughout the Classical Greek world as recounted in Homer's Odyssey, and included his visiting the grave of English poet Rupert Brooke on the island of Skyros. In 1929, Halliburton published New Worlds To Conquer, which recounted his swimming of the Panama Canal—in August 1928 he spent 10 days swimming approximately 47 miles (76 km) over a period of 50 hours in the water, during which he was protected from alligators and other dangers by an Army sharpshooter in a nearby rowboat, and paid a toll of just 36 cents ($6.75 in 2025), which was based on his tonnage of 140 pounds (64 kg). The book also covered other journeys, including retracing the track of Hernán Cortés' conquest of Mexico, and his enactment of the role of Robinson Crusoe as a "cast away" on the island of Tobago in the Caribbean, donning a full goat-skin costume as had been worn by Alexander Selkirk when he was marooned in the South Pacific Ocean in the early 18th century. Animals figure prominently in this and many other of Halliburton's adventures.

=== Ascent to fame ===
Halliburton's friends during this time included movie stars, writers, musicians, painters, and politicians, including writers Gertrude Atherton and Kathleen Norris, Senator James Phelan, philanthropist Noël Sullivan, and actors Ramón Novarro and Rod La Rocque. Casual acquaintances were many, as lectures, personal appearances (notably to promote India Speaks), syndicated columns, and radio broadcasts made him a household name associated with romantic travel.

Halliburton was acquainted with swashbuckling cinema star Douglas Fairbanks Sr., who was also a world traveler. Halliburton himself, though several times approached about film versions of his adventures (notably by Fox Film Corporation in 1933 for The Royal Road to Romance), only appeared in one movie, the Walter Futter-produced semi-documentary India Speaks (1932, a sequel to the Futter-produced Africa Speaks!; re-released in 1947, it was given the lurid title of Bride of Buddha or Bride of the East). Weak in plot, romantic interest, special effects and dramatic incident, the film could hardly compete with 1932's outdoor blockbuster adventure Tarzan, the Ape Man with Johnny Weissmuller and Maureen O'Sullivan or 1933's smashing box office success King Kong with Robert Armstrong and Fay Wray, and its poor reception encouraged Halliburton to forgo a secondary career in cinema.

=== Flying Carpet expedition ===
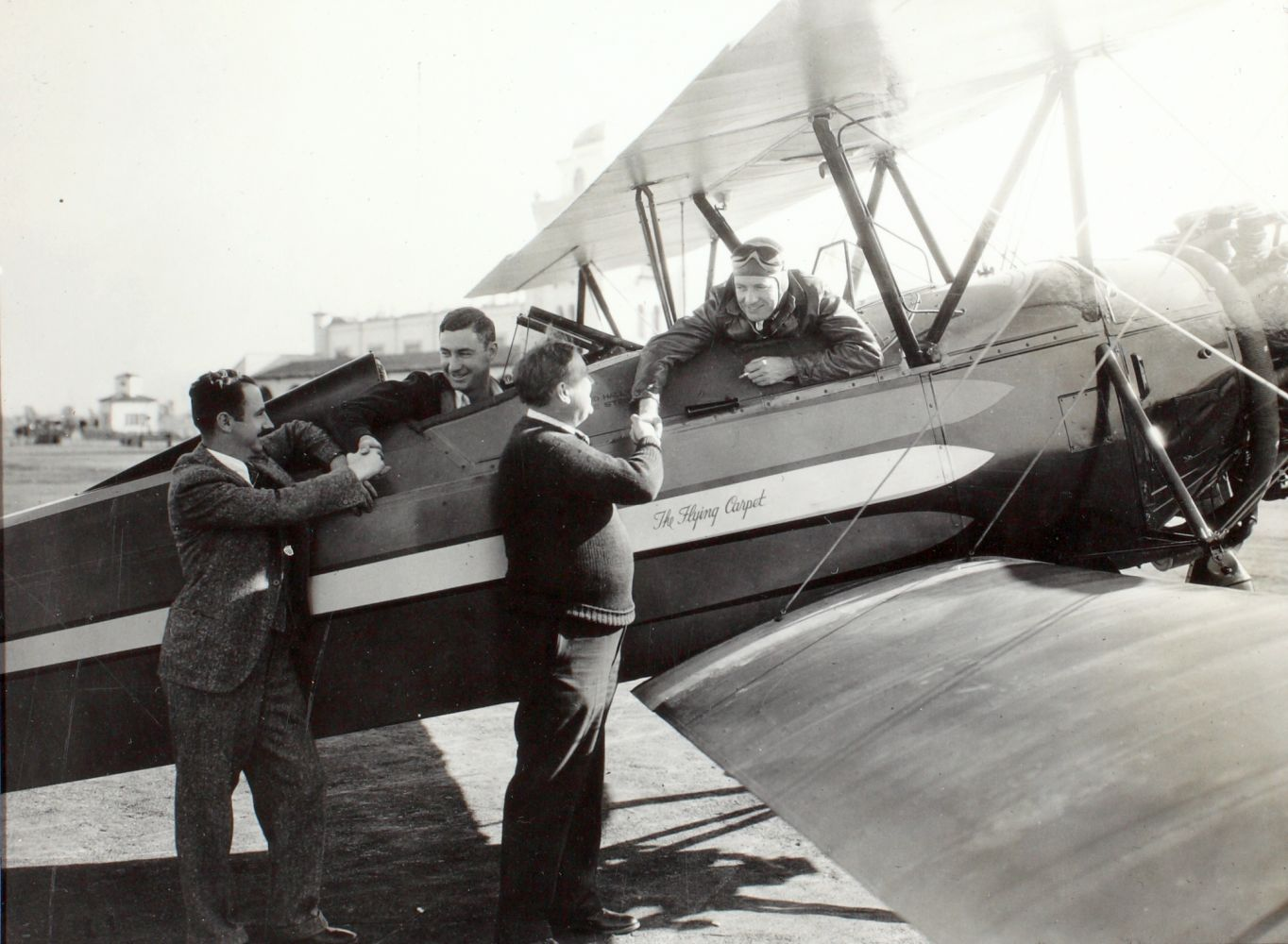
Halliburton (forward) and Moye Stephens (aft) shaking hands from Stearman C-3B Flying Carpet, NR882N

In 1930, Halliburton hired pioneer aviator Moye Stephens on the strength of a handshake for no pay, but unlimited expenses—to fly him around the world in an open cockpit biplane. The modified Stearman C-3B was named the Flying Carpet after the magic carpet of fairy tales, subsequently the title of his 1932 best-seller. They embarked on "one of the most fantastic, extended air journeys ever recorded" taking 18 months to circumnavigate the globe, covering 33,660 miles (54,170 km) and visiting 34 countries.

The pair started on Christmas Day 1930, making stops along the way, from Los Angeles to New York City, where they crated the airplane and boarded it on the oceanliner RMS Majestic. They sailed to England, where their extended mission began. They flew to France, then Spain, the British possession of Gibraltar, and on to Africa at Fez, Morocco (where Stephens performed aerobatics for the first air meet held in that country). They crossed the Atlas Mountains and set out across the Sahara to Timbuktu, using the fuel caches of the Shell Oil Company. While in Timbuktu, they were guests of Pere Yakouba, a French Augustinian friar who had fled years before from the distractions of modern society and become a patriarch and a noted scholar of the community. They flew to their destination without mishap, then continued northward and eastward, spending several weeks in Algeria with the French Foreign Legion, and continuing via Cairo and Damascus, with a side trip to Petra.

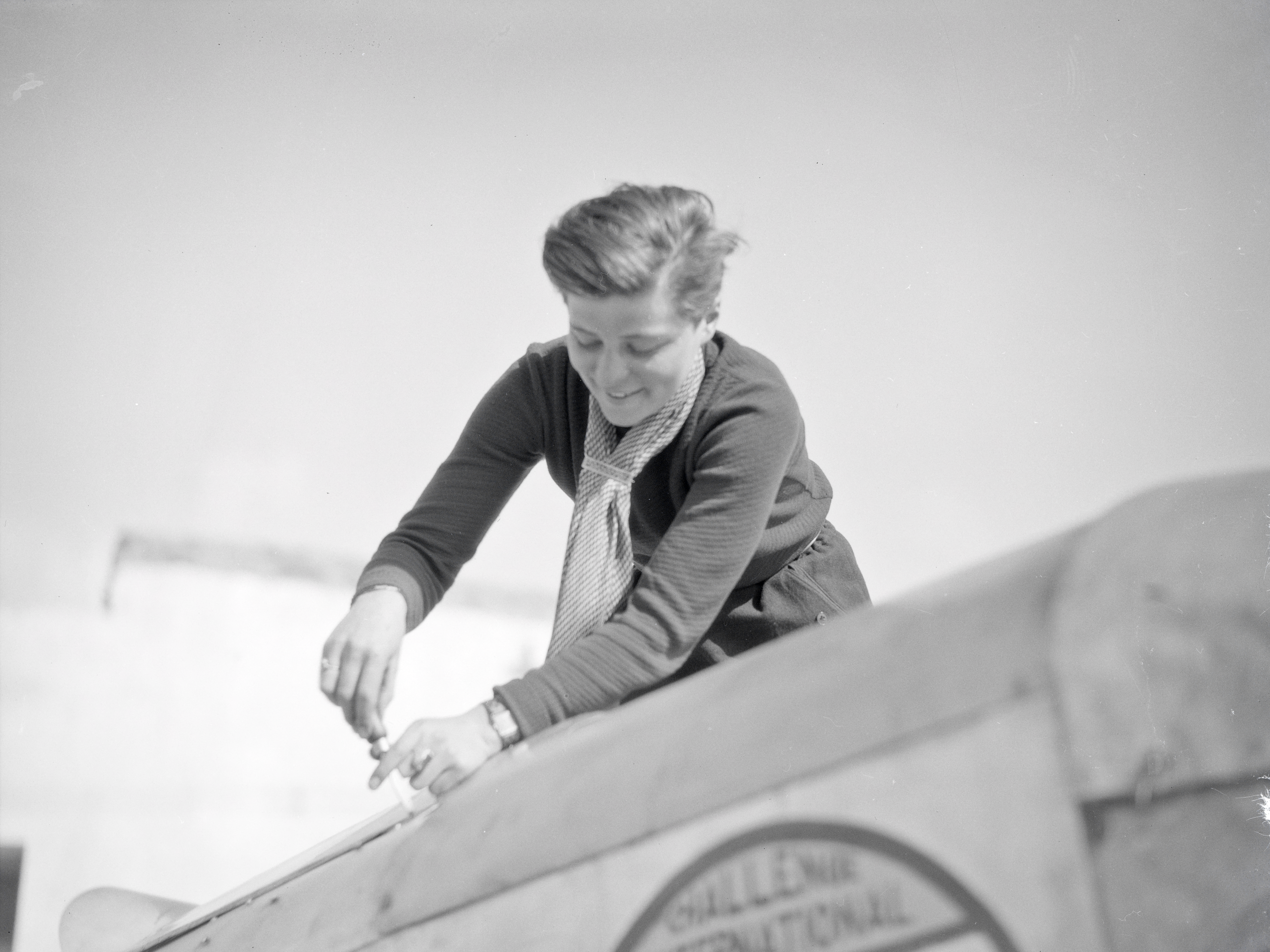
Elly Beinhorn in Morocco, 1931

In Persia (now Iran) they met German aviator Elly Beinhorn, who was grounded by mechanical problems. They assisted her and then worked out shared itineraries. Later, Halliburton wrote a foreword to her book Flying Girl about the adventures she had in the air. In spite of being exhausted, and their plane becoming less safe, Stephens and Halliburton continued their eastward journey. In Persia, they took Crown Princess Mahin Banu for a ride in the airplane; in neighbouring Iraq, they gave the young Crown Prince Ghazi a ride, flying him over his school yard.

In India, Halliburton visited the Taj Mahal, which he had first visited in 1922. In Nepal, as The Flying Carpet flew past Mount Everest, Halliburton stood up in the open cockpit of the plane and took the first aerial photograph of the mountain, and to the delight of an amazed Maharajah of Nepal, Stephens and Beinhorn performed daring aerobatics. In Borneo, Halliburton and Stephens were feted by Sylvia Brett, wife of the White Rajah of Sarawak. They gave her a ride, making Ranee Sylvia the first woman to fly in that country. At the Rajang River, they took the chief of the Dyak head hunters for a flight; he gave them 60 kilograms (130 lb) of shrunken heads, which they dared not refuse but dumped as soon as possible. They were the first Americans to fly to the Philippines; after arriving in Manila on April 27, the plane was again loaded onto a ship (SS President McKinley) to cross the ocean. They flew the final leg from San Francisco to Los Angeles. A fictionalized account of his travels in India and Asia was depicted in the 1933 film India Speaks.

Moye Stephens was a skilled pilot. Halliburton, in a reassuring letter to his parents (January 23, 1932), recited his many flight skills. Stephens, for instance, during one aerobatic display, astutely aborted a slow roll the moment he realized that Halliburton had not fastened his seat belt. Stephens later became chief test pilot of the Northrop Flying Wing, which evolved into today's B-2 Spirit stealth bomber. The around-the-world trip had cost Halliburton over $50,000, plus fuel. In the first year, the book, entitled The Flying Carpet (after his valiant plane) earned him royalties of $100,000, in those depression-era days a remarkably large sum. Barbara H. Schultz's Flying Carpets, Flying Wings – The Biography of Moye Stephens (2011), besides recounting the Flying Carpet Expedition from a flier's viewpoint and documenting Stephens' (1906–1995) contributions to aviation history, contains Stephens' extended reports of the adventure. With rare glimpses into the travel writer's art, these give historic balance to Halliburton's often romanticized renditions.

=== Commissioned research travel and feature article writing ===
Early in 1934, the Bell Syndicate Newspapers contracted with newspapers throughout the United States, beginning with The Boston Globe, to publish weekly feature stories prepared by Halliburton. About 1,000 words each with pictures, ultimately 50 stories resulted. Among these were stories about the Seri Indians of Southern California, Fort Jefferson, where Dr. Samuel Mudd, convicted of conspiracy in the assassination of President Abraham Lincoln, was imprisoned; Admiral Richmond Pearson Hobson, who deliberately sank his own ship during the Spanish–American War, the Battle of Santiago de Cuba a month later; Henri Christophe and the Citadelle Laferrière in Haiti; Christopher Columbus, Lord Byron, and "The Girl from Martinique Who Wrecked Napoleon". Paid well, to fulfill his end of the deal, Halliburton traveled extensively to Cuba, Haiti, Martinique, Miami, Washington, D. C. (to do research at the Library of Congress), to New York, Europe, and finally to Russia.

At the height of his popularity, he appeared on radio, attended celebrity parties (including one at the home of novelist Kathleen Norris who also wrote stories that appeared regularly in the newspapers). After the purchasing a used Ford roadster, he explored the heartland of California and the beauties of the Lake Tahoe area. Other commissions followed: United Artists was producing a movie about Benvenuto Cellini; they asked him to do a story on the Renaissance artist's love life. Halliburton also gave frequent lectures and even turned down offers; a radio company offered him the considerable sum of $500 a week for 26 weeks, "to speak on a beer program". The Memphis Commercial Appeal, and newspapers in Milwaukee, Kansas City, Columbus, and Toronto published his syndicated stories.

At the end of the year, Halliburton returned to Europe to fulfill his dream of emulating Hannibal by crossing the Alps on an elephant—one chosen for the task from a Paris zoo named "Miss Dalrymple", going from Martigny (Switzerland) to Aosta (Italy). The following year, Bobbs-Merrill published Halliburton's Seven League Boots, filled with his latest adventures and arguably the last of the great travel works of the classic period.

=== Hangover House in Laguna Beach, California ===
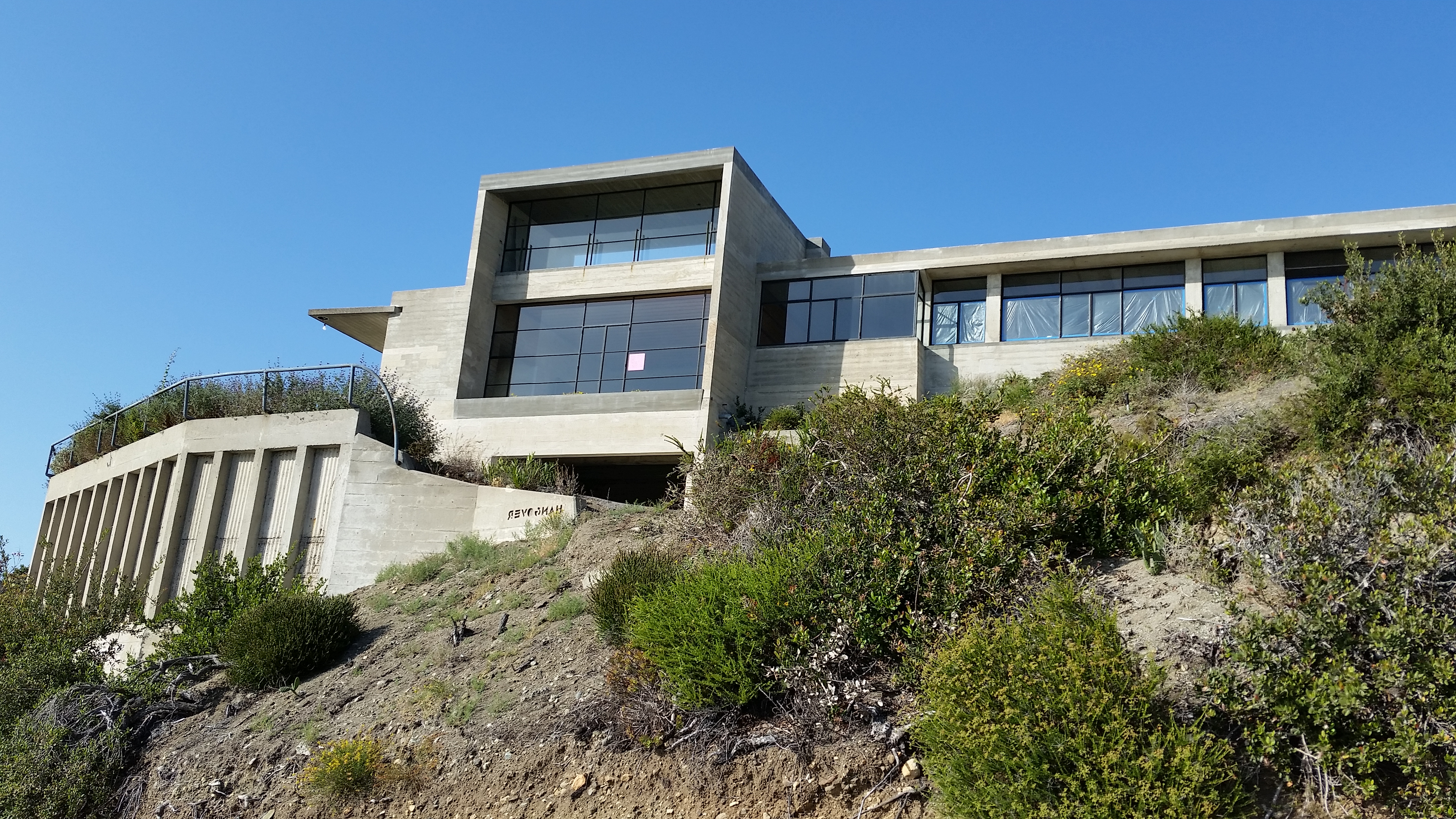
Hangover House (2016); the word "HANGOVER" (in mirror writing) is stamped into the concrete retaining wall

In 1937, William Alexander Levy designed a house for Halliburton in Laguna Beach, California, which is now known as "a landmark of modern architecture". Alexander was a novice architect, a recent graduate of the New York University School of Architecture and close friend of Paul Mooney. Mooney managed the construction of the house. The house, built of concrete and steel, fortress-like in appearance, contains a spacious living room and dining room and three bedrooms: one for Halliburton, which featured a wall-sized map of the world, one for Mooney and one for Levy. Because of its position, perched 400 feet (120 m) above a sheer canyon, it was called "Hangover House" by Mooney, and this title was cast into a retaining wall on the site. Writer Ayn Rand, who visited the house in 1937 while still an unknown writer, is believed to have based the "Heller House" in The Fountainhead (1943) upon Halliburton's house.

=== Sea Dragon expedition ===
On September 23, 1938, Halliburton boarded the SS President Coolidge, bound for Hong Kong. From Hong Kong he intended to sail a Chinese junk across the Pacific Ocean to San Francisco. The junk, named the Sea Dragon (Chinese: 海龍; pinyin: Hǎi Lóng), was an essentially a Wenchow-style junk, 75 ft (23 m) in length, modified to Halliburton's specifications and built in the shipyards of Kowloon by shipwright Fat Kau. Its stern was emblazoned with a colorful dragon, its interior hull was equipped with a diesel engine; the Sea Dragon, a dramatic symbol of East meeting West, was to be an attraction at the Golden Gate International Exposition (GGIE) in San Francisco (at Treasure Island); there, after its three-month voyage across the Pacific, it would dock and, for a small admission fee, take fair-goers on excursions around San Francisco Bay.

According to Halliburton's first cousin, whom he visited in 1938, the trip was meant, in part, to renew interest in Halliburton himself, whose fame at the time was in decline. Biographers credit the idea for the voyage to Walter Gaines Swanson, who, as the Exposition's public relations manager, promoted its goal of celebrating both the Oakland Bay Bridge and Golden Gate Bridge as well as the cultures of the Pacific Rim. Despite having an interest in sailing craft since childhood, Halliburton had little practical navigation experience. Seeking capable leadership, he hired veteran mariner John Wenlock Welch as his captain and Henry von Fehren as his engineer. Besides Halliburton's secretary, Paul Mooney, the initial crew included George Barstow III, a 21-year-old student at Juilliard, Dartmouth "lads" John Rust Potter, Robert Hill Chase, and Gordon Ellicott Torrey. The crew composition would change; engineer's assistant Richard L. Davis would bow out, ship's cook James Sligh, and able-bodied seamen Ralph Granrud and Benjamin Flagg would be added and a last-minute entry, student globetrotter Velman Fitch of the University of Minnesota. A Chinese mess boy, a Chinese bosun, and two Chinese sailors completed the crew.

After he inspected a number of junks along the China coast, finding most either too expensive or wholly unseaworthy, Halliburton decided to have a junk built. Although it took less than six weeks to complete; its construction was marked by cost overruns, delays, engineering errors, and what Halliburton perceived as the primitive work habits of the Chinese carpenters, issues prompting him to write, "If any one of my readers wishes to be driven rapidly and violently insane, and doesn't know how to go about it, let me make a suggestion: Try building a Chinese junk in a Chinese shipyard during a war with Japan." From the start, funding for the project was a main problem. The corporate sponsors whom Halliburton approached thought the risks of the enterprise greater than its rewards. Chinese venture capitalists in Chinatown thought it far too dangerous while China was torn by war and Buick refused to be associated with something called a "junk". The Sea Dragon expedition was partly funded through paid subscriptions for a projected series of progress reports that Halliburton intended to send from China, sales of commemorative tokens and other keepsakes, and expected tourist excursions. Major and immediate funding came from Halliburton's wealthy relatives, including the wife of his cousin Erle P. Halliburton. $14,000 ($320,213 in 2025) of the $26,500 ($606,117 in 2025) raised came from the three crew members from Dartmouth: Robert Chase, John "Brue" Potter, and Gordon Torrey, who had extensive amateur sailing experience.

A trial run in January 1939 revealed the vessel's flaws; the completed Sea Dragon, distinctly top heavy, rode precariously low, rolling and heeling in moderately active waters. Nevertheless, on January 27, Halliburton assured his subscribers that the dry deck of the craft indicated its buoyancy and, implicitly, its seaworthiness. To improve its stability, however, 10 tons of concrete ballast were supposedly poured into its hull. There were other concerns. Many observers thought the heavy diesel engine, which released endangering fumes, was out of place aboard a vessel that traditionally sailed sufficiently without mechanical assistance. Moreover, Chief Officer Dale Collins of the SS President Coolidge, along with others, noted that the masts and sails were far too heavy, and that the poop deck, meant to house a radio cabin and galley, was 10 feet (3.0 m) higher than befit a junk of its size.

In February, the first attempted voyage was forced to turn back on the 14th after a week at sea, due to an illness among the crew. For medical reasons, Potter stayed behind after the junk's unsuccessful first voyage and later offered an account of his experiences, as did Torrey. Besides poor performance by the junk in rough seas, the February attempt was aborted due to an injury sustained by Potter when struck by the mainsail boom while handling the 18-foot (5.5 m) tiller. Sea Dragon expedition researcher Gerry Max has noted that Potter, as well as Torrey, who did not make the trip, and a couple of other crew members may have contracted gonorrhea during their time in Hong Kong at the start of the voyage. Dysentery also afflicted several crew members including Captain Welch. Halliburton himself suffered from a skin rash, the result perhaps of high anxiety, and nervous exhaustion. Days before the first crossing attempt, Mooney broke an ankle after falling down a ladder. Halliburton sent four letters to subscribers from Hong Kong between November 20, 1938, and February 16, 1939; the fifth, he promised, would be sent from Midway Island.

==== March 1939 departure and disappearance ====
Hastily repaired and recaulked, the Sea Dragon left port once again on March 4, 1939. Recruits added to replace Potter and Torrey included able-bodied seamen Ben Flagg and Ralph Granrud, both in their early twenties. Globe-trotter Velman Fitch, whose seaman skills were uncertain, hitched a ride at the last minute. The first few weeks of the voyage, if uneventful, went according to plan. Soon, however, the junk began to labor through increasingly troubled waters.

Sea Dragon, March 23rd. Collins, President Coolidge. Southerly gales. Squalls. Lee rail under water. Hardtack. Bully beef. Wet bunks. Having wonderful time. Wish you were here instead of me.

— Welch, master (March 24, 1939)

On March 23, three weeks out to sea, the junk headed into a typhoon approximately 1,200 miles (1,900 km) west of Midway, which it had intended to reach on April 3. The closest friendly ship to the junk was the liner President Coolidge, 400 miles (640 km) away, and 1,180 miles (1,900 km) west of Midway, itself battling huge seas. It was presumed to be on its way to rendezvous with the beleaguered craft. Among the radio messages the liner received from the junk's Captain Welch was an ironically cheerful one: "Having a wonderful time. Wish you were here instead of me." As noted by the Coolidge, waves during those dire moments were estimated at 40 feet (12 m) high. The next message was different: "Southerly gale. Heavy Rain Squalls. High sea. Barometer 29.46. True course 100. Speed 5.5 knots. Position 1200 GCT 31.10 north 155.00 east. All well. When closer may we avail ourselves of your direction finder. Regards Welch." That was the last message heard from the junk.

==== Search efforts ====
Halliburton had kept regular, if sporadic, contact with radio stations and trans-Pacific Ocean liners. On March 27, the Honolulu Star-Bulletin noted on its front page that Sea Dragon had not been heard from since March 24. That Halliburton could be in danger was reported by the Associated Press on March 28.

At first, the Coast Guard at Hawaii delayed searching for the missing ship, possibly thinking Halliburton staged his disappearance as a publicity stunt. After the Sea Dragon was a week overdue to call at Midway, on April 10, friends petitioned the Coast Guard to send a search vessel.

A Yugoslavian freighter, SS Recina, was the first to arrive at the last reported position of Sea Dragon, on April 16. Later in May, an extensive U.S. Navy search with several ships and scout planes, including USS Astoria, scouring 152,000 square miles (390,000 km^{2}) over the course of many days, found no trace of the junk or the crew, and the effort was ended. By June, Halliburton's mother abandoned hope that he would be found alive.

==== Later events ====
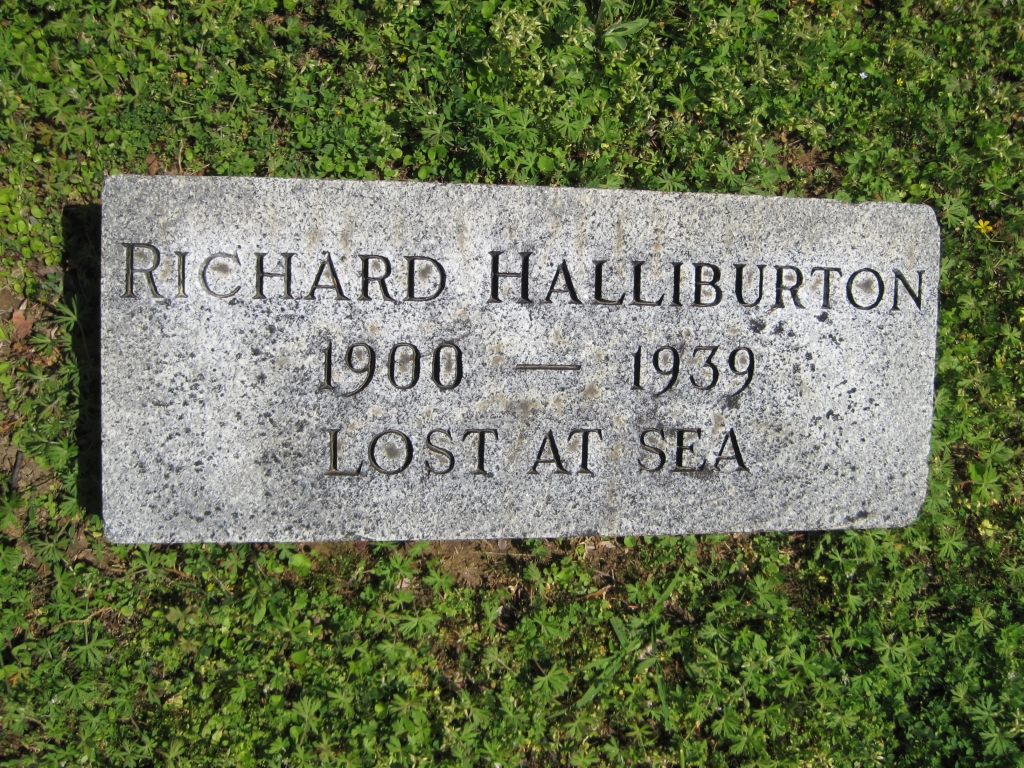
Richard Halliburton's monument

As with Amelia Earhart, many rumors and reports of Halliburton's fate continued to arise over the years, with fans hoping he might yet turn up alive. The ocean liner SS President Pierce, captained by Charles Jokstad, passed flotsam in the middle of the Pacific, covered with an estimated one year's growth of barnacles in 1940, believed to be from the wreck of the Sea Dragon, perhaps the ship's rudder. In 1945, a 30-foot (9.1 m) skeleton of a 150-foot (46 m) boat of oriental design, mistaken by some as that of the 75-foot (23 m) Sea Dragon, washed ashore in San Diego, California.

Missing at sea since March 1939, Halliburton was declared dead on October 5, 1939, by the Memphis Chancery Court. His empty grave is at Forest Hill Cemetery in Memphis at the Halliburton family gravesite. A 1957 newspaper report stated that some locals near his final residence, Hangover House in Laguna Beach, believed it was haunted by his ghost.

== Personal life ==
Halliburton never married. In his teens he dated several young women and, as revealed in letters to them, was infatuated with at least two of them. As an adult, his companions were chiefly male. Among those romantically linked to him were film star Ramón Novarro and philanthropist Noël Sullivan, both of whom enjoyed, as Halliburton did, a bohemian lifestyle. Halliburton's most enduring relationship was with freelance journalist Paul Mooney, with whom he often shared living quarters and who assisted him with his written work. French police reports, dated 1935, noted the famed traveler's homosexual activity when in Paris at about the time of his planned crossing by elephant over the Alps: "Mr Halliburton is a homosexual well known in some specialized establishments. He is in the habit of soliciting on Saint-Lazare Street" (near the station of the same name).

=== Private writing ===
Halliburton admired English poet Rupert Brooke (1887–1915), whose Apollonian beauty and patriotic verse captivated a generation. Halliburton intended to write his biography and kept ample notes for the task, interviewing in person or corresponding with prominent British literary and salon figures who had known Brooke, including Lady Violet Asquith Bonham-Carter, Walter de la Mare, Cathleen Nesbitt, Noel Olivier, Alec Waugh, and Virginia Woolf. Halliburton never began the book, but his notes were used by Arthur Springer to write Red Wine of Youth—A Biography of Rupert Brooke (New York: Bobbs-Merrill, 1952).

A vigorous correspondent, Halliburton wrote numerous letters to fans, friends, editors, sponsors, and literary acquaintances. To his parents alone, he wrote well over a thousand letters; a large selection of these, edited in part by his father Wesley, was published in 1940 by Bobbs-Merrill as Richard Halliburton: His Story of His Life's Adventure As Told to His Mother and Father.

== Character of published work ==
In his colorful and simply-told travel adventures Halliburton was the "innocent abroad", receptive to new ideas which he in turn expressed with a quiet erudition. Throughout his creative life he displayed a romantic readiness that shone through his best prose, prose at once picturesque, gently informative, extroverted, and personally confiding. He often described his attaching himself to a famous historic person (or key event for which that person was known) or to a revered place, such as the Taj Mahal. Acting as sort of an emcee, or performing some often cleverly garish stunt, he recalled that person and invoked a place associated with him; by so doing, he escorted readers to a different time and locale, with some reflective asides added into his narrative for perspective. Accordingly, he duplicated Hannibal's crossing of the Alps by elephant – naming the pachyderm he had gotten from a Paris zoo Miss Elysabethe Dalrymple; he emulated Ulysses' myriad adventures in the Mediterranean dressed often as a beach-comber or playboy; he re-enacted Robinson Crusoe's island solitude, adopting a menagerie of domestic pets with names such as Listerine, Kitty and Susie. Examples of this cultural self-enlistment filled his work and helped define his public image. Of further note, he retraced the fateful expedition of Hernando Cortez to the heart of the Aztec Empire, like his hero Lord Byron, he swam the Hellespont, metaphorically bridging Europe and Asia, and he lived among the French Foreign Legion in North Africa.

Halliburton was an early proponent of what Susan Sontag in her essay "Notes on 'Camp'" tagged "the theatricalization of experience." He did not just view legendary places and landscapes, but dramatized them, often by performing, in relationship to them, some athletic feat ultimately intended to thrill armchair travelers as well as to educate them: he swam the Panama Canal, climbed the Matterhorn and Mount Fuji (achieving its first documented winter ascent), and twice he descended into the Mayan Well of Death, the Sacred Cenote of Chichen Itza. The occasional trouble that he received from authorities only contributed to the excitement of his adventures. Such run-ins occurred when he breached security to take photos of the guns at Gibraltar and was arrested; again, when he attempted to enter Mecca, which is forbidden to non-Muslims; and yet again when he sneaked past the gatekeepers at the Taj Mahal where, beneath a moonlit sky, he indulged in a swim in the sacred pool that faced the worshiped tomb.

Halliburton's books were meant for the general reading public. Into households across America, they brought the world's many divergent peoples and cultures. Conveyed was a wide-eyed fascination with the foreign and exotic rather than, as is true of books by contemporaries Robert Byron (1905–1941) and Lily Adams Beck (1862–1931), a deep intimacy with such. Racist comments their author made, though for the time not unique to him, when revisited today, are unsettling. At times ethnocentric, he thought it "extraordinary" that "such a primitive race" as the Seri people residing in Lower California "should live so close to (presumably civilized) Hollywood." Of the blending of races and cultures he encountered, Halliburton attempted to be descriptive rather than judgmental. Still, intrigued by the "slim Sonias" working in Blood Alley in Shanghai, he seemed both amused and dismayed by the interracial mingling that their physical appearances suggested to him: "When Chinese blood and foreign blood are mixed, especially if the foreign blood is Russian, Portuguese or French, the devastating result is something to write home about." Halliburton's ideas on miscegenation are traceable partly to racist notions prevalent in his day. One source was Lothrop Stoddard's The Rising Tide of Color Against White World-Supremacy (1920), a popular book in its day. Regarding marriage and matrimonial customs—what he calls "the sex-mysteries," Halliburton could be both matter-of-fact and ingenuously outspoken. In Borneo, he notes that for the Dayak people "free love is not only accepted, but encouraged," and, after describing their courtship rituals, remarks that "in this utterly natural society there is no such thing as prostitution or repression."

Halliburton's love of the world's natural wonders, and such monuments of mankind that best complimented those wonders, derives in part from the Romanticism of poets William Wordsworth and Samuel Taylor Coleridge. His admiration may have been piqued by his exposure at Princeton to English Professor Henry Van Dyke, a popular essayist and poet of his time who was also a teacher of Halliburton's editor, David Laurance Chambers. Like them, Halliburton took a dim view of technology, and he gently urged that one see the world's marvels before "modern Progress" obliterated them.

Halliburton was a cultural relativist. Believing that "culture was king," he adhered to the credibility of multiple perspectives. The attitude may explain in part his adopting the garb of a particular region by "going native," and in general his welcoming regard for the nuances of differing cultural identities and mores. As a sort of cultural ambassador, he met high-end government officials and heads of state from Peruvian dictator Augusto Leguia, to British Ambassador to Italy (during World War I) James Rennell Rodd, to Emperor Haile Selassie of Ethiopia, to the Last Emperor of China, to King Feisal al Husain of Iraq and his son the Crown Prince (Ghazi).

Over time, Halliburton's social and political views shifted. An early letter (1923) expressed his "virulent antipathy for democracy as practiced in America" and a hatred "for the laboring class", but these views contrast with the plight he shared with the abused prisoners at Devil's Island, and is evident in some early maritime adventures of working alongside rough-hewn seamen. In "Straight Talk From Russia," in Seven League Boots (1935), he contrasted the suspension of freedoms in the communist nation to the freedoms people enjoyed in democratic America, exuberantly praising the latter.

Halliburton's last works (done in collaboration with journalist Paul Mooney), notably The Letters from the Sea Dragon and The Log of the Sea Dragon, both of which offer asides of Japan's hostile presence in China, suggest the war-reportorial course his writing might have taken had he lived. A news correspondent's role is also suggested by his skilled interview with the executioner of the Romanovs, the last ruling dynasty of Russia. Distinguished by their readerliness, the essays on historic persons which appeared in both his books and newspaper articles, specifically of Spanish–American War hero Captain Richard Hobson and of Haitian leader Henri Christophe, show the skills of a natural biographer, and offer a further hint of career evolution.

== Legacy ==
Publisher James O'Reilly, who reissued The Royal Road to Romance to celebrate the centenary of Halliburton's birth, characterized the author-adventurer thus: "From the Jazz Age through the Great Depression to the eve of World War II, he thrilled an entire generation of readers." He was "clever, resourceful, undaunted, cheerful in the face of dreadful odds, ever-optimistic about the world and the people around him, always scheming about his next adventure." He wrote that Halliburton's "manhood spanned the brief interval between the two World Wars" and acclaims him as a "spokesman for the youth of a generation". Halliburton insisted throughout his career on the importance of travel abroad as a means of self-improvement and discovery. He was an advocate by example of the 'grand tour' championed by monarchs and the upper classes from the days of Henry VIII through to the Belle Epoque, and he championed the study abroad programs featured in the curricula of many colleges and universities.

Halliburton wanted to be remembered as the most-traveled man who ever lived, but he was surpassed by the contemporary globetrotters and influences, Burton Holmes and Harry Franck. During his lifetime, he had few rivals, though Carveth Wells (Adventure!), Eugene Wright (The Great Horn Spoon) and Martin and Osa Johnson (Safari) could equally captivate. Called the "Richard Halliburton of the occult," William Seabrook (1884–1945) (Jungle Ways) commanded nearly as wide a readership.

For contemporaries Thomas Wolfe, F. Scott Fitzgerald, Corey Ford and Ernest Hemingway, Halliburton held some literary (and for humorist Ford, some satiric) appeal. Writers Paul Theroux, Jim Harrison and Susan Sontag, among others, acknowledged debts of gratitude for his influence on their work. Television news celebrity and author Walter Cronkite, who heard him lecture in the mid-1930s, credited Halliburton with steering him to a career in journalism. As the writer of a succession of bestsellers, and as a popular lecturer, Halliburton figured prominently in educating several generations of young Americans in the rudiments of geography, history and culture, especially through his two Books of Marvels, re-issued in one volume after his death.

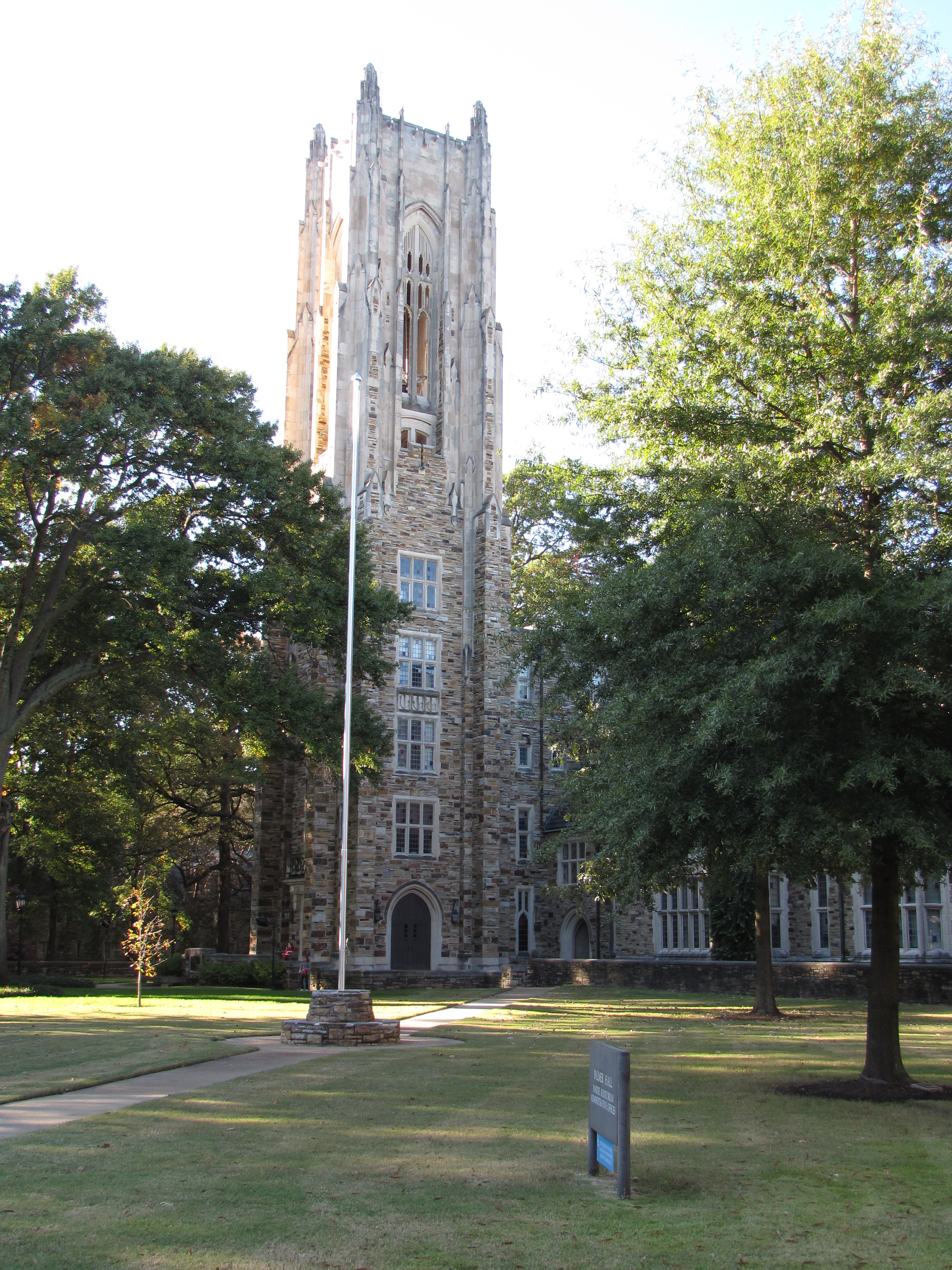
Halliburton Tower, Rhodes College (2009)

Two structures commemorate Halliburton: Hangover House in Laguna Beach, California, and the Memorial Tower at Rhodes College in Memphis, Tennessee. Architecture historian and writer Ted Wells considers Hangover House, which Halliburton commissioned, to be one of the "best modern houses in the United States". Nearly a quarter century after Halliburton's disappearance, his father donated $400,000 to build an imposing bell tower. It was dedicated in 1962 as the Richard Halliburton Memorial Tower; the elder man died the following year at age 95.

In his Second Book of Marvels, Halliburton stated, "Astronomers say that the Great Wall is the only man-made thing on our planet visible to the human eye from the moon." Although untrue, this statement was a possible source for the urban legend that the Great Wall of China could be seen from space.

The Richard Halliburton Papers are held at Princeton University Library and the Richard Halliburton Collection at Paul Barret Jr. Library at Rhodes College.

Beginning with Gerry Max's Horizon Chasers: The Lives and Adventures of Richard Halliburton and Paul Mooney, published in 2007, a succession of books about Halliburton has appeared. John Hamilton's Journalism's Roving Eye: A History of American Newsgathering Abroad, published in 2009, devotes considerable space to Halliburton and his contemporaries in the travel writing field. A Shooting Star Meets The Well of Death by William R. Taylor appeared in 2013, The Forgotten Adventures of Richard Halliburton: A High Flying Life from Tennessee to Timbuktu by R. Scott Williams in 2014, American Daredevil: The Extraordinary Life of Richard Halliburton, the World's First Celebrity Travel Writer by Cathryn J. Prince in 2016, and Richard Halliburton and the Voyage of the Sea Dragon by Gerry Max in 2020. Of interest is Garrett Drake's fictional The Secret of the King's Tomb (one of a series) subtitled "a Richard Halliburton Adventure" (Green E-Book, 2019). Also of interest is Ruth Wolff's novel The Sea Dragon (Xlibris, c2021).

The World War II liberty ship SS Richard Halliburton was named in his honor.

== Works ==
Monographs

- — (1925). The Royal Road to Romance. Indianapolis, Indiana: The Bobbs-Merrill Company.
  - Covering the Matterhorn, Andorra, the Alhambra, Seville, Gibraltar, Monte Carlo, the Nile, Punjab, Kashmir, Ladakh, the Khyber Pass, Angkor, Bangkok, Bali, Japan and the ascent of Mt. Fuji
- — (1927). The Glorious Adventure. Indianapolis, Indiana: The Bobbs-Merrill Company.
  - Following the path of Ulysses around the Mediterranean
- — (1929). New Worlds to Conquer. Indianapolis, Indiana: The Bobbs-Merrill Company.
  - Covering Central and South America, including the Panama Canal, the Mayan Well of Death, and Devil's Island
- — (1932). The Flying Carpet. Indianapolis, Indiana: The Bobbs-Merrill Company.
  - See above
- — (1935). Seven League Boots. Indianapolis, Indiana: The Bobbs-Merrill Company.
  - Covering Ethiopia, Russia, Arabia, the Alps
- — (1937). Richard Halliburton's Book of Marvels: the Occident. Indianapolis, Indiana: The Bobbs-Merrill Company.
  - Originally titled Marvels of the West
- — (1938). Richard Halliburton's Second Book of Marvels: the Orient. Indianapolis, Indiana: The Bobbs-Merrill Company.
- — (1940). Richard Halliburton: His Story of His Life's Adventure, as Told in Letters to His Mother and Father. Indianapolis, Indiana: The Bobbs-Merrill Company.
- — (1941). Richard Halliburton's Complete Book of Marvels. Indianapolis, Indiana: The Bobbs-Merrill Company.
- — (1947). The Royal Adventures of Richard Halliburton. Indianapolis, Indiana: The Bobbs-Merrill Company.
  - Republication of The Royal Road to Romance (1925), The Glorious Adventure (1927), and New Worlds to Conquer (1929) in a single volume

As contributor

- India Speaks with Richard Halliburton, Grosset & Dunlap-Publishers, New York, 1933
  - "Richard Halliburton, who in the photoplay India Speaks, plays the part of a young American traveling in India and Tibet in search of adventure. The photographs that follow are stills selected from the film taken by several different cameramen sent to Asia for the purpose-film which supplies the authentic background for the photoplay."
- One Hundred Years of Delightful Indigestion – Memphis Priceless and Treasured Receipts, Introduction by Richard Halliburton, World Traveler, Author and Epicure (Memphis: James Lee Memorial Academy of Arts, 1935)

== Notes and references ==
=== Further reading ===
- Alt, John H. Don't Die in Bed: The Brief, Intense Life of Richard Halliburton. Atlanta: Quincunx Press, 2013
- Austen, Roger. Playing the Game: The Homosexual Novel in America. 1977
- Blankenship, Michael. "A Fellow Traveler," The Advocate—The National Gay and Lesbian News Magazine, July 18, 1989, pp. 38–43.
- Cortese, James. Richard Halliburton's Royal Road. Memphis: White Rose Press, 1989
- Deffaa, Chip. "On the Trail of Richard Halliburton '21: A Young Alumnus Searches for the Man Behind the Legend," Princeton Alumni Weekly, May 13, 1973.
- Gilliam, Ronald, "Richard Halliburton and Moye Stephens: Traveling Around the World in the Flying Carpet",Aviation History (date unclear)
- Hauser, Ernest O. "War Clouds Over Hong Kong," Travel, July 1938, pp. 22–25, 49–50.
- Heaver, Stuart. "Richard Halliburton: The Hero Time Forgot," South China Morning Post, March 23, 2014.
- Hochschild, Adam, American Midnight - The Great War, A Violent Peace, and Democracy's Forgotten Crisis. New York: Mariner Books/Harper/Collins Publishers, 2022.
- Max, Gerry (2007). 'Horizon Chasers: The Lives and Adventures of Richard Halliburton and Paul Mooney'. Jefferson, N.C.: McFarland & Co.
- Max, Gerry. "The Royal Road To Romance in the USA: Thomas Wolfe, Richard Halliburton, Eco-Tourism and Eco-Poetry", Thomas Wolfe Review, Volume 38, Nos. 1 & 2, 2014, pp. 80–94.
- Max, Gerry. Richard Halliburton and the Voyage of the Sea Dragon, Knoxville, Tennessee: University of Tennessee Press, 2020.
- Morris, Charles E. (III), "Richard Halliburton's Bearded Tales", Quarterly Journal of Speech, Vol. 95, No. 2, May 2009, pp. 123–147.
- Prince, Cathryn J. American Daredevil: The Extraordinary Life of Richard Halliburton, the World's First Celebrity Travel Writer. Chicago: Chicago Review Press, 2016, ISBN 978-1613731598.
- Root, Jonathan. Halliburton: The Magnificent Myth. New York: Coward-McCann, 1965.
- Schultz, Barbara H. Flying Carpets, Flying Wings: The Biography of Moye Stephens. Lancaster, California: Plane Mercantile, c2011.
- Schwartz, David M. "On the Royal Road to Adventures with 'Daring Dick.'" Smithsonian Magazine 19.12, March 1, 1989, pp. 159–160, 162–164, 166, 168, 170, 172, 174–178
- Taylor, William R. A Shooting Star Meets the Well of Death, Why and How Richard Halliburton Conquered the World, Abbeville, SC: Moonshine Cove Publishing, 2013, ISBN 1937327353.
- Townsend, Guy., Memphis Magazine, originally published August 1977, reprinted April 2001
- "Fair-Haired Carpeteer". Time. November 14, 1932. Archived from the original on April 12, 2010., a 1932 Time magazine review of The Flying Carpet
- Wilde, Winston. Legacies of Love: A Heritage of Queer Bonding (Haworth Press)
- Williams, R. Scott. The Forgotten Adventures of Richard Halliburton: A High Flying Life From Tennessee to Timbuktu, Charleston, South Carolina: The History Press, 2014, ISBN 978-1540211811.
