= William Alexander Levy =

American architect

William Alexander
- Born: October 21, 1909; Brooklyn, New York
- Died: June 2, 1997 (aged 87); West Hollywood, California, USA
- Occupation: Architect
- Buildings: Hangover House; House in Space (Hollywood Hills); House in Flight (Hollywood Hills)

Alexander Levy (1909–1997), later known as William Alexander Levy, was an American architect who worked principally in Southern California.

Early in his career, he was influenced by the work of Frank Lloyd Wright and Le Corbusier. At New York University's new School of Architecture, he studied under Raymond Bossange and Ely Jacques Kahn. One of his art and clay modeling instructors was sculptor Concetta Scaravaglione.

Also at NYU, he had as an instructor of English Thomas Wolfe. Perhaps inspired by his association with NYU's New School of Architecture whose students he counted among his best, Wolfe's The Party at Jack's (UNC-Chapel Hill, 1995, pp. 41–42) contains some of his best writing on architectural subjects.

In 1933 or 1934, he worked briefly for skyscraper designer Raymond Hood, who also had been an occasional lecturer at NYU. Renovation of dilapidated structures at Fort Schuyler in the Bronx was Alexander's first commission, one funded by the U.S. government. Other chiefly private client commissions followed. These included interiors for designer Christian Dior, novelist/ travel writer Conrad Bercovicci, and biographer Marcia Davenport.

Alexander is best known for the design and building of Hangover House in Laguna Beach, California, commissioned by travel writer Richard Halliburton in 1937. The house had three bedrooms, one for Halliburton, one for Alexander, and one for Paul Mooney, Halliburton's companion and writing assistant, who collaborated with Halliburton on his later writing projects and who managed construction of the house. In 1937, writer Ayn Rand, then unknown, visited Hangover House and Alexander provided her with quotes for her forthcoming novel The Fountainhead (1943). According to Alexander, Rand's descriptions of the Heller House are thinly disguised references to the house.

Later, Alexander assisted in the redesign of composer Arnold Schoenberg's studio in Brentwood, and also designed a house in Encino for scriptwriter David Greggory. The house in the Hollywood Hills he built for himself he called the House in Space, distinct as an early example in the region of cantilever construction. Alexander also designed wooden furniture and bowls.

Alexander continued to practice architecture and interior design and by 1950 had moved permanently to West Hollywood.

He designed two of his most important commissions in Baja California Sur for hotelier Abelardo Luis “Rod” Rodríguez and actress Lucille Bremer: Rancho Las Cruces (1950), a low, white stucco complex set between the Santa Cruz Mountains and the Sea of Cortez northeast of La Paz, and the original Hotel Palmilla (1955) (now One&Only Palmilla), a compact, terraced block poised on Punta Palmilla outside San José del Cabo, where nearly every room faced the water. At Las Cruces, he combined local stone, brick, and tile with modernist planning to produce a spare, sea‑oriented composition that early visitors praised as “smart modern architecture,” while at Palmilla, he translated similar ideas, fusing Mexican Colonial and mission‑influenced forms with mid‑century structural clarity. Together, these two properties marked the birth of luxury tourism on this stretch of the peninsula and, in later reminiscences such as his manuscript “Meanderings,” Bill singled out Hotel Palmilla as his greatest architectural work.

In 1952, Alexander opened The Mart, one of the first art and antique boutiques in Los Angeles, on Santa Monica Boulevard, operating it until 1977. During this period, he occasionally had bit parts in feature films, notably The Shootist, starring John Wayne, and The McMasters, starring Brock Peters, his sometime business partner at The Mart. A developer of the Hollywood Hills and a philanthropist, Alexander became a patron of the arts and a world traveler.

Alexander's papers are kept at the Architecture and Design Collection, at the Art, Design & Architecture Museum, at the University of California, Santa Barbara. Additional papers, including photographs and his notes for an autobiography entitled Meanderings, are among the items in the Gerry and Carole Max Archive of The Richard Halliburton Collection at Rhodes College in Memphis.

== Buildings and Projects ==
- 1938: Richard Halliburton House, Laguna Beach, California
- 1939: Arnold Schoenberg music studio remodel, Brentwood, California
- 1948: David Greggory house, Encino, California
- 1953: "House in Space," Los Angeles, California
- 1955-58: Hotel Las Cruces Palmilla, San José del Cabo, Mexico
- 1956: Abelardo "Rod" Rodriguez II house, San José del Cabo, Mexico
- 1957: Robert Fisher house, San Jose del Cabo, Mexico
- 1970: Village Plan for Todos Santos, Mexico

== Additional Sources ==
- 1951 Photo of William Alexander by Edmund Teske, Los Angeles County Museum of Art
- Architectural Record, "House for Writer Affords Privacy and Spectacular View," October, 1938, pp. 47-51.
- Max, Gerry. Horizon Chasers--The Lives and Adventures of Richard Halliburton and Paul Mooney. (McFarland, 2007).
- Max, Gerry. Many Mansions. Unpublished monograph on the life and achievement of William Alexander (née Levy), Aldo Magi Collection in Thomas Wolfe Papers at the University of North Carolina, Chapel Hill, c1997
- Max, Gerry, "Student Themes: William Alexander Remembers Thomas Wolfe," The Thomas Wolfe Review, 2012, Volume 36, Nos. 1 & 2, pp. 135–143.
