= India Speaks =

1933 film directed by Richard Halliburton

- Theatrical poster for 1949 re-release by Film Classics
- Directed by: Richard Halliburton
- Written by: Norman Houston
- Produced by: Walter Futter
- Starring: Richard Halliburton
- Narrated by: Richard Halliburton
- Cinematography: Peverell Marley; Robert Connell; H. T. Cowling
- Edited by: David Miller
- Music by: Samuel Wineland
- Production company: The Futter Corporation
- Distributed by: RKO Radio Pictures
- Release dates: April 28, 1933 (U.S.); 1949 (Film Classics re-release)
- Running time: 80 minutes
- Country: United States
- Language: English

India Speaks is a 1933 American Pre-Code adventure film, combining elements of documentaries and travelogue programs, mostly taking place on the Indian sub-continent along with staged bits spliced in to aid story flow. Produced by Walter Futter from a screenplay by Norman Houston, the film was directed, narrated and starring Richard Halliburton. A sequel to the popular film Africa Speaks!.

== Plot ==
Ostensibly a filmed recollection of Richard Halliburton's travels on the Indian sub-continent, the film combined actual footage shot in India, with scenes which were created on the sound stages of Hollywood. Halliburton was a well-known adventurer of the day, having traveled the world extensively, and even becoming the first man to swim the Panama Canal. The film follows Halliburton's travels, from the Hindu temple of the Goddess of Kali, through the deserted temples of Angkor Wat, where he is tempted to try to gain a fortune in jewels, only to be thwarted by a guardian cobra.

He watches as Hindu devotees wash away their sins in the Ganges River, and is discovered as he attempts to sneak into the great mosque in Delhi during the feast of Ramadan. He falls in love with a 16-year-old princess from Kashmir, only to have the relationship aborted by the weather, then becomes friends with a high-ranking Lama in Tibet. At one point, the film contains the first ever footage of ecstatic rites by Hindus, in the city of Madras, whereby they pierce their cheeks and tongues with sharp needles, and pull large carts which are attached to their bodies by means of hooks inserted in their flesh.

The only credited cast member is Richard Halliburton, who stars as "The Adventurer", as well as being the narrator of the film.

== Production ==
In 1932, United Artists reached an agreement with the producer, Walter Futter, to produce a dramatized version of a travelogue of the travels of the well-known adventurer, Richard Halliburton. In March 1933, the distribution rights were transferred to RKO Radio Pictures. The working title of this film was Jade, but was changed to India Speaks in January 1931. This film was the second in Futter's series of dramatic travelogues, the first being Africa Speaks.

The cinematographers, Peverell Marley, Robert Connell, and H. T. Cowling, spent several months in India and southeast Asia, taking footage used in the film. While many industry sources of the period claimed that Halliburton had overseen the photography in Asia, in a personal appearance at Radio City Music Hall, admitted that he had not been in Asia while the footage was being shot. This point is also highlighted by Futter in an on-screen forward to the film.

The film's release was delayed when Futter developed a case of pneumonia. Controversy arose after the film was released, with one of the cameramen, Herford Tynes Cowling (H.T. Cowling), claiming to be the producer of the film, and that his footage was being misused. He filed a grievance with the Federal Trade Commission to bar the film from being shown, but no record exists that the grievance was successful.

== Reception ==
Most of the reviews at the time were positive. Screenland stated that "Though some of the picture bears the obvious stamp of Hollywood, as a whole it is fairly interesting." The New York American called the picture "a fascinating film record of the eternal Mother India ... rest assured that you'll applaud the offering as did the first audiences." The Daily News called it "thrilling", while Film Daily described it as an "Exciting, interesting and thrilling adventure film with unusually fine narrative."

However, Variety said of the film, "It turns out to be a wearisome 80 minutes of travelog, irritatingly interrupted by indifferent acting"; and Mordaunt Hall of The New York Times called it "a curious concoction of fact and fiction".

== Preservation status ==
This is now considered a lost film.

== Popular culture ==
The title of this film, along with other films with similar titles such as Africa Speaks! and Mussolini Speaks, gave Duke Ellington the idea to call his song "Harlem Speaks". The film was also made into a novel, although it is not clear whether this happened before or after the film was released to the public. The book was written by Will C. Murphey.

== See also ==
- List of lost films
