= Africa Screams =

1949 film by Charles Barton

- Original theatrical release lobby card
- Directed by: Charles Barton
- Written by: Earl Baldwin
- Screenplay by: Martin Ragaway; Leonard B. Stern
- Produced by: Huntington Hartford; Edward Nassour
- Starring: Bud Abbott; Lou Costello; Clyde Beatty; Frank Buck; Hillary Brooke; Max Baer; Buddy Baer; Shemp Howard; Joe Besser
- Cinematography: Charles Van Enger
- Edited by: Frank Gross
- Music by: Walter Schumann
- Production companies: Huntington Hartford Productions; Nassour Studios
- Distributed by: United Artists
- Release dates: May 4, 1949 (New York City, New York); May 27, 1949 (United States)
- Running time: 79 minutes
- Country: United States
- Language: English
- Budget: $500,000
- Box office: $1.5 million

Africa Screams is a 1949 American adventure comedy film starring Abbott and Costello and directed by Charles Barton that parodies the safari genre. The title is a play on the title of the 1930 documentary Africa Speaks! The supporting cast features Clyde Beatty, Frank Buck, Hillary Brooke, Max Baer, Buddy Baer, Shemp Howard and Joe Besser. The film entered the public domain in 1977.

== Plot ==
Africa Screams (1949)

Diana Emerson visits the book section of Klopper's department store seeking a copy of Dark Safari by the famed explorer Cuddleford. She tells the clerk, Buzz Johnson, that she will pay $2,500 for a map that is inside the book. Buzz's friend and coworker Stanley Livington, an armchair explorer, has read the book and says that he is familiar with a map within it. Buzz brings Stanley to Diana's home to draw the map, but when he overhears Diana offer Clyde Beatty $20,000 to lead an expedition to capture a legendary giant ape, Buzz realizes that the map is worth considerably more. Buzz negotiates for more money and for him and Stanley to join the safari.

They travel to the Congo with Diana's team of explorers, including Harry "Boots" Wilson, Grappler McCoy and Gunner, a nearsighted professional hunter. When he learns that the expedition's true goal is not the giant ape but a fortune in diamonds, Buzz renegotiates their deal again. However, the map in the book with which Stanley is familiar is one that he had drawn himself to plot the route to his job at Klopper's. Still, Stanley's memory of the book's details bring the party to the region in which Diana is interested. There they run across famed animal collector Frank Buck.

A cannibal tribe sets a trail of diamonds to lure and capture Buzz and Stanley. The boys are rescued by a grateful gorilla whom Stanley had inadvertently rescued from one of Frank Buck's traps. The cannibal chief offers Diana diamonds in exchange for Stanley, but Stanley flees while Buzz recovers the diamonds and hides them. While pursuing Stanley, the expeditionary team and the cannibals are frightened away by the giant ape whose existence had been dismissed as myth. Meanwhile, the friendly gorilla recovers the diamonds before Buzz can do so. Distraught over the loss of his treasure, Buzz abandons Stanley in the jungle.

Some time later, back in the United States, Stanley appears prosperous and owns his own skyscraper, and Buzz works as the elevator operator. Stanley's partner is the gorilla who had recovered the diamonds.

== Cast ==
- Bud Abbott as Buzz Johnson
- Lou Costello as Stanley Livington
- Clyde Beatty as himself
- Frank Buck as himself
- Max Baer as Grappler McCoy
- Buddy Baer as Boots Wilson
- Hillary Brooke as Diana Emerson
- Shemp Howard as Gunner
- Joe Besser as Harry
- Burton Wenland as Bobo
- Charles Gemora as The Ape

== Production and history ==
Africa Screams was filmed from November 10 through December 22, 1948 at the Nassour Studios in Los Angeles. The film was produced by Edward Nassour and A&P heir Huntington Hartford. It was the second of Abbott and Costello's independently financed productions while they were under contract to Universal. It was released by United Artists.

Abbott and Costello surrounded themselves with family and friends, and the picture ran over budget. Nassour was so distressed that a running joke on the set was that the film should be retitled "Nassour Screams".

Clyde Beatty provided his own animals for the film. The affectionate gorilla pursuing Costello was originally scripted as a female. However, the Breen Office censors who enforced the Motion Picture Production Code demanded that the gorilla's sex be changed to avoid suggestions of bestiality.

Africa Screams was Abbott and Costello's first production with Hillary Brooke and Joe Besser, both of whom would later become part of the ensemble cast of the television series The Abbott and Costello Show. This film also marked the only time that Besser and Shemp Howard appeared together in a film; Besser would replace Howard as one of the Three Stooges following Howard's death in 1955.

The film was purchased in 1953 by Robert Haggiag, an independent distributor in New York. Haggiag failed to renew the copyright because he had lost interest in the film, and it fell into the public domain in 1977. Author and film historian Bob Furmanek contacted Haggiag in the late 1980s and obtained the original nitrate stock. Most of the original camera negative had decomposed, but the nitrate fine grain was still serviceable and Furmanek transferred it to 35mm for preservation.

== Release ==
The film opened May 4, 1949 at the Criterion Theatre in New York City and grossed $17,500 in its opening week.

== Home media ==
This film is in the public domain and has been released multiple times on VHS and DVD by several companies. Bob Furmanek launched a Kickstarter project to raise funds to restore the film on Blu-ray on December 1, 2019 and reached his original $7,500 goal in about 29 hours. The Blu-ray version was released in June 2020.

== Historical references ==
The main character's name of Stanley Livington suggests the surnames of British explorers Henry Morton Stanley and David Livingstone, who had a famous meeting in 1871. It is not known whether the change from Livingstone to Livington is the result of a typographical error or a deliberate change.

== See also ==
- Africa Squeaks
