= Walter Futter =

American film director

- Born: 2 January 1900; Omaha, Nebraska
- Died: 3 March 1958 (aged 58); New York City, New York
- Occupation(s): Film director, producer

Walter Futter (January 2, 1900 – March 3, 1958) was a film producer and director in the United States. After an initial career cutting and editing films, Futter began writing and producing his own shorts and movies, often using footage he acquired. He had success with Africa Speaks!, a popular movie, which combined Paul L. Hoefler's footage filmed in the field, staged scenes filmed in Los Angeles, and narration by Lowell Thomas. He produced more than 250 short films, including series of shorts entitled Walter Futter's Traveloques and Walter Futter's Curiosities. Hoot Gibson starred in a number of his western films. Another of his more than 50 longer films was Jericho, also called Dark Sands.

== Early life ==
Walter Futter was born January 2, 1900, in Omaha, Nebraska. His parents, both born in Germany, were William and Elizabeth Futter. He had an older brother, Frederick. Futter attended University of Omaha.

== Career ==
Futter moved to Hollywood, California and worked as a film cutter at Goldwyn Studios. He then worked for Cosmopolitan Productions as an editor in the 1920s. He worked on Janice Meredith and The Great White Way in 1924. By 1926, he established the Futter Production Company and began producing films as well as buying and selling films. His brother, Fred, joined him in creating a stock footage library called "Wafilms". They bought up bankrupt stock and film made by amateurs and the venture proved successful, earning them the nickname "the junk-men of filmdom". Futter headed the firm Diversion Pictures, which had a library of 8mm and 16mm film and a reversible processing laboratory. (Note: Futter's brother, Fred, later ran the organization until it closed in 1960.) Beginning in 1925, he created more than 250 short films.

In Africa Speaks is to be found the all-talking celluloid record of the Colorado expedition's trip across the Congo. It is said to differ from all other films of its type inasmuch as it is not only a stirring jungle adventure but also an emotional romance of the lives, loves and hates between man and beast in a primitive land. The story stretches across the heart of the Congo, picturing weird customs, wild dances, age-old rituals to heathen gods and a panorama of heretofore hidden secrets of the dark continent.

—"In the Film Houses", Pittsburgh Post-Gazette, October 4, 1930

Futter made about 50 movies over the course of his career, including Africa Speaks! (1930) and India Speaks (1933). Futter partnered with Paul L. Hoefler of the Colorado African Expedition to create Africa Speaks!, a documentary film using footage from a 14 month expedition across Africa that covered 14,000 miles. It captured scenes and sounds of wildlife and religious rites and cultural practices of various peoples, like the Maasai and Iti tribes. Among the many animals captured in the documentary, Hoefler filmed lions hunting for food. Futter was writer, director, and editor of the film. In 1932, he released India Speaks, starring world traveler and adventurer Richard Halliburton in which many of the scenes were shot at Yosemite and Griffith Park in California.

External videos
- Walter Futter's Curiosities #1 (1930)

Also in the early 1930s, he worked on two series of shorts, Walter Futter's Traveloques and Walter Futter's Curiosities, showing unusual incidents that have occurred around the world.

With Fenn Kimball, he produced Hong Kong Nights (1935). He produced the westerns The Riding Avenger, Frontier Justice, Lucky Terror, Feud of the West, Swifty, and Cavalcade of the West, all released in 1936 and starring Hoot Gibson. Paul Robeson, Wallace Ford, and Henry Wilcoxon starred in his film Dark Sands, also called Jericho (1937), which was made in Britain. He also produced Fighting For the Fatherland, The Black Doll (1938), White Sails (1939), and Monsieur Fabre (1951), a biographical film about Jean-Henri Fabre.

== Personal life ==
Futter married actress Adele Lacey in December 1937. She died in Mexico City on July 3, 1953. He married actress Betty Bartley in 1955. The following year, Bartley gave birth to a baby who lived only eight hours. Their marriage ended in 1956, and they began divorce proceedings in 1957. He died on March 3, 1958, in New York, while the couple was still separated.

== See also ==
- Goona-goona epic
- Exploitation films
