= Cavalcade of the West =

1936 film by Harry L. Fraser

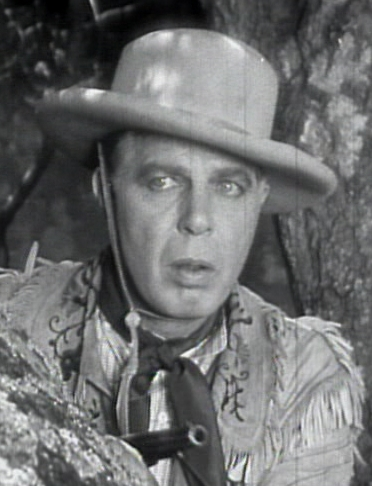
- Hoot Gibson
- Directed by: Harry L. Fraser
- Written by: Norman Houston
- Produced by: Walter Futter
- Starring: Hoot Gibson
- Cinematography: Paul Ivano
- Edited by: Arthur A. Brooks
- Distributed by: Diversion Pictures; Grand National Films
- Release date: October 1, 1936
- Running time: 59 minutes
- Country: United States
- Language: English

Cavalcade of the West is a 1936 American Western film directed by Harry L. Fraser.

== Plot ==
When a family misses the rendezvous for a wagon train they venture on their own to join it. They are ambushed by three outlaws who murder the father, knock out the mother and steal one of the two boys for themselves.

As the years go by, the remaining brother, Clint, and his mother, are looked after by others in the community with Clint making a living breaking and selling horses while the kidnapped brother Asa becomes an outlaw known as Ace Carter, presumably under the tutelage of his kidnappers. When the Pony Express is created, both brothers, their relationship unknown to each other, attempt to join as riders. Clint is accepted for the most dangerous route whilst Ace is rejected. Ace revenges himself by robbing the mail from his brother, and by robbing a stagecoach. The robbery of which Clint is suspected. Clint tracks down Ace and discovers him to be his long-lost brother. And when townsmen arrive to "string up" Ace for the robbery, Clint faces a tough choice.

== Cast ==
- Hoot Gibson ... Clint Knox
- Rex Lease ... Ace Carter AKA Asa Knox
- Marion Shilling ... Mary Christman
- Adam Goodman ... Windy Harper
- Nina Guilbert ... Mrs Martha Knox
- Earl Dwire ... George Christman
- Phil Dunham ... Reporter
- Robert McKenzie ... Judge
- Steve Clark ... John Knox
- Jerry Tucker ... Clint as a young boy
- Barry Downing ... Asa as a young boy
