= Lucky Terror =

1936 film by Alan James

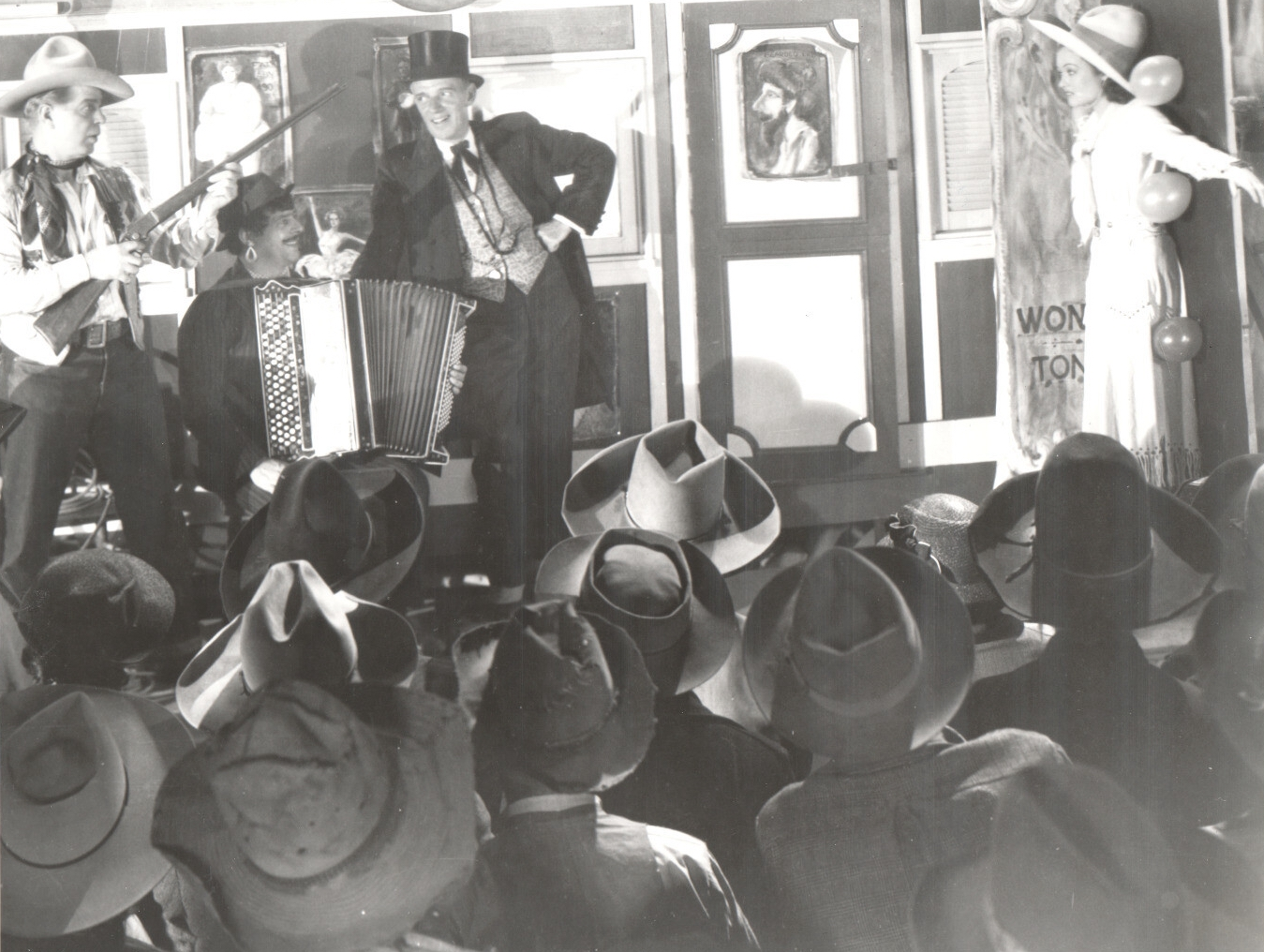
- Directed by: Alan James
- Written by: Roger Allman
- Screenplay by: Alan James
- Produced by: Walter Futter
- Starring: Hoot Gibson
- Cinematography: Arthur Reed
- Edited by: Carl Himm
- Distributed by: Grand National
- Release date: February 20, 1936
- Running time: 61 minutes
- Country: United States
- Language: English

Lucky Terror is a 1936 American Western film starring Hoot Gibson and directed by Alan James.

== Plot ==
This plot summary appeared in the book Astor Pictures.

The third of a half-dozen oaters Hoot Gibson made for producer Walter Futter's Diversion Pictures, Lucky Terror proved to be one of Gibson's final solo starring films, and one of his better later offerings. Hooter is a drifter who helps a young woman (Lona Andre) whose gold mine is sought by crooks. Astor Pictures re-released this Grand National film to theaters in 1946.

== Cast ==
- Hoot Gibson as Lucky Carson aka The Lucky Terror
- Charles Hill as Doc Halliday
- Lona Andre as Ann Thornton aka Madame Fatima
- George Chesebro as Jim Thornton (Ann's uncle)
- Robert McKenzie as Sheriff Hodges
- Jack Rockwell as Bat Moulton
- Frank Yaconelli as Anthony "Tony" Giribaldi (Doc's flunky)
- Charles King as Wheeler (lawyer)
- Horace B. Carpenter
