= Jericho (1937 film) =

- A poster with the film's alternative title: Dark Sands
- Directed by: Thornton Freeland
- Written by: George Barraud; Walter Futter
- Produced by: Walter Futter
- Starring: Paul Robeson
- Cinematography: John W. Boyle
- Edited by: Edward B. Jarvis
- Music by: Van Phillips
- Distributed by: Capitol Films
- Release dates: 23 August 1937 (UK); 16 August 1938 (USA)
- Running time: 75 minutes
- Country: United Kingdom
- Language: English

Jericho (U.S. title Dark Sands) is a 1937 British drama film directed by Thornton Freeland and starring Paul Robeson, Henry Wilcoxon and Wallace Ford. It was written by George Barraud and Walter Futter.

== Plot ==
A World War I American troopship is torpedoed, and many soldiers are trapped below the deck. Jericho Jackson, a medical student drafted into the war, heroically saves the trapped men, in defiance of his superior's orders to abandon ship, but accidentally kills the officer in the melee. Despite his heroism, Jericho is court-martialed for refusing orders. Embittered, he escapes. Captain Mack is held responsible for his escape and court-martialed.

Jericho ends up in North Africa, where he meets the Tuareg people. When he uses his medical skills to heal the sick, the Tuareg welcome Jericho into their tribe, and he marries and raises a family. He eventually becomes the Tuaregs' leader. He leads his people to victory over rivals and brings peace and unity to the region through which the Tuareg trek annually to trade for salt. When an anthropology film crew's coverage of the salt trek is shown in London, Captain Mack spots Jericho and vows to track him down. However, when the captain sees how much good Jericho has done for his adopted people, he relents and flies away alone.

== Cast ==
- Paul Robeson as Cpl. Jericho Jackson
- Henry Wilcoxon as Capt. Mack
- Wallace Ford as Mike Clancy
- Kouka as Gara
- John Laurie as Hassan
- James Carew as Maj. J.R. Barnes
- Lawrence Brown as Pvt. Face
- Rufus Fennell as Sgt. Gamey
- Ike Hatch as Pvt. Tag
- Frank Cram as Col. Lake
- Frank Cochrane as Agouba
- George Barraud as explorer
- Frederick Cooper as explorer
- Henry Aubin as explorer
- Eugene Cozier as Mick Jackson (uncredited)
- Charles Farrell as Sergeant on guard (uncredited)
- Peter Gawthorne as Court Martial President (uncredited)
- Danny Green as Sergeant (uncredited)

== Reception ==
The Monthly Film Bulletin wrote: "There is some good desert photography, and an excellent comedy-performance from Wallace Ford as the doughboy. But the film suffers from a rambling construction. The treatment is episodic, and the ending somewhat abrupt. The four main figures around whom the film is built each have their little part to play ... but with the exception of Wallace Ford, who is in any case eventually polished off for no particular reason, they have no great opportunities for displaying their talents, and the four strands are never properly interwoven."

Kine Weekly wrote: "Apart from a slight tendency to ramble, the original story, projected into the desert by the exigencies of war, consorts with realism and produces an arresting succession of big thrills. Paul Robeson, magnificently versatile in the main part is the king pin of the fantastic but interesting and popular entertainment. ... Good story, big spectacle, outstanding performance by Paul Robeson, versatile and popular supporting cast, authentic, colourful atmosphere, good music and star values."

Variety wrote: "Unusual picture which cannot fail to interest audiences throughout the world. The splendid technical qualities in connection with the photography of a trek to the salt mines of Africa would seem to be the most modern sort of film craftmanship, revealing a welter of realism. ... Robeson plays with reserve and discretion. He can indicate violent emotion without raising his voice out of the middle register. Acting throughout is on a high level, but it is the unusual story and absorbing African scenes which provide popular entertainment for all classes."
