= Paul L. Hoefler =

Paul Louis Hoefler (1893–1982) was a photographer, reporter and cinematographer who filmed wildlife and tribal scenes in Africa that were used in the popular documentary film Africa Speaks! produced by Walter Futter.

== Early life ==
Hoefler was born on September 6, 1893, in Spokane, Washington. His parents were Caroline Louise and Otto Louis Hoefler and his brothers were Lucien, Dudley, George, Phillip, and Howard.

== Career ==
Hoefler partnered with Walter Futter to make the film Africa Speaks!. He traveled to Africa and spent 14 months traveling across Africa, filming wild animals and various peoples. Film from an expedition to Africa was also spliced with film shot in Los Angeles to make the film. He wrote a book about the expedition and the making of the film entitled Africa Speaks. From the 1950s to the 1980s he ran the academic film company Paul L. Hoefler Productions.
