= Betty Bartley =

American actress (1922–2013)

- Born: November 12, 1922
- Died: September 10, 2013 (aged 90)
- Occupation: Actress

Betty Bartley Nannariello (November 12, 1922 – September 10, 2013), known professionally as Betty Bartley, was an American television and film actress. She began her career as a child actor and continued in film, television, and stage performances including appearances in early talkies, including The Laughing Lady. Illustrator McClelland Barclay chose her in 1941 as the Ideal Streamlined Ziegfeld Girl.

== Early life ==
Betty Bartley was born on November 12, 1922. Her mother, Elenor Marie McGraw (1892–1956), was the daughter of Thomas and Elizabeth McGraw of Seneca, New York. Her mother first married Hugh Bartley and lived in Belle Harbor, Queens, and then married Charles Devaney in 1933. She lived her married life in Belle Harbor and the Rockaways, New York until her death in October 1956. Bartley began acting as a child, appearing in the talkie film The Laughing Lady in 1929.

== Career ==
In 1939 and 1940, she appeared in the Broadway musical revue The Streets of Paris. Bartley was then a dancer in an Ed Wynn Broadway production in 1941. She starred in a production of Three Men on a Horse at the Westchester Playhouse in 1946. Her television performances before 1951 were on the shows Studio One, Man Against Crime, and Sure As Fate. In 1951, she was in the Broadway play Twentieth Century. She was among the cast of the traveling production of Twin Beds in 1954. In 1959, she starred in Bert Lahr's stage production of DuBarry Was a Lady.

Over the course of her career, she had appeared in films and stage productions with Maurice Chevalier, Fredric March, Ed Wynn, Nancy Carroll, and Abbott and Costello.

== Personal life ==
In 1946, Bartley married MGM stage and story editor Howard Hoyt, with whom she had a son, William B. Hoyt. Her second husband was director Walter Futter in 1955. The following year, Bartley gave birth to a baby who lived only eight hours. Their marriage ended in 1956, and they began divorce proceedings in 1957. Walter Futter died in 1958, while the couple was still separated. In 1959 Bartley was said to lead a firm that made cinemascope lenses. She married advertising executive Edgar Krass in September 1959, and they had a son in June 1960. Their sons are Edgar B. Krass and Richard B. Krass. By 1985, she married John Nannariello, who died in 1993.

Betty Bartley died in St. Petersburg, Florida in 2013.
