= Africa Speaks! =

1930 American documentary film

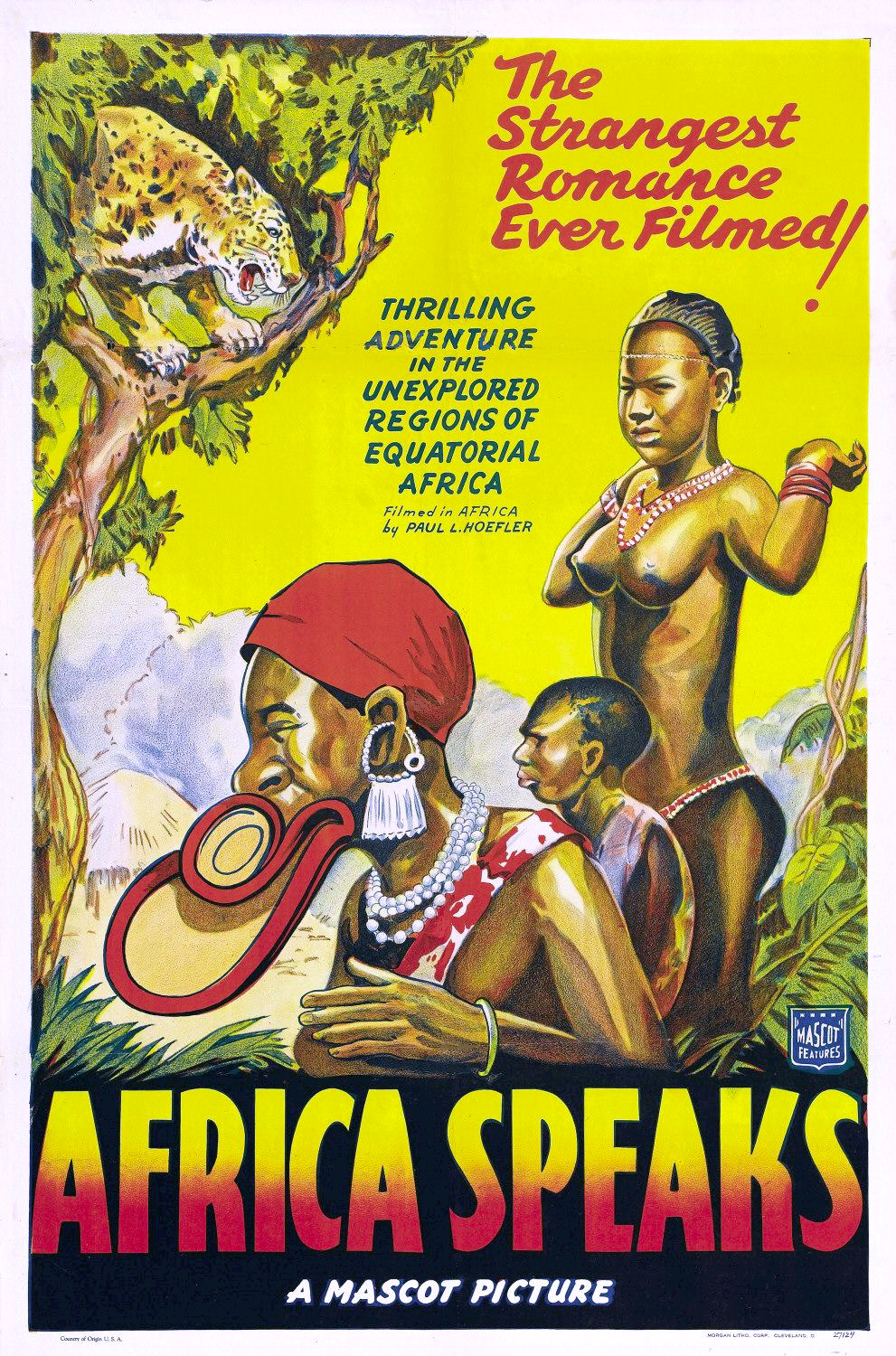
- Theatrical release poster
- Directed by: Walter Futter
- Written by: Walter Futter
- Produced by: Walter Futter; Paul L. Hoefler
- Narrated by: Lowell Thomas
- Cinematography: Paul L. Hoefler
- Edited by: Walter Futter
- Production company: Mascot Pictures
- Distributed by: Columbia Pictures
- Release date: August 15, 1930
- Running time: 75 minutes
- Countries: United States; France
- Languages: English; French
- Budget: less than $50,000

Africa Speaks! is a 1930 American-French adventure documentary film directed by Walter Futter and narrated by Lowell Thomas. It is an exploitation film.

== Premise ==
Africa Speaks! (1930)

Paul L. Hoefler heads a 1928 expedition to Africa capturing wildlife and tribes on film.

== Production ==
Although the film was shot over the fourteen months of the expedition in the Serengeti and in Uganda, a scene involving an attack by a lion on a native was apparently staged at the Selig Zoo in Los Angeles and involved a toothless lion.

Hoefler wrote a book entitled Africa Speaks about the expedition that was published in 1931.

== References in popular culture ==
The title of the film was parodied in the 1940 cartoon Africa Squeaks and the 1949 Abbott and Costello film Africa Screams.

== Home media ==
Africa Speaks was released on Region 0 DVD-R by Alpha Video on July 7, 2015.

== See also ==
- Goona-goona epic
