= Nakedness and colonialism =

Indigenous adornment and racism

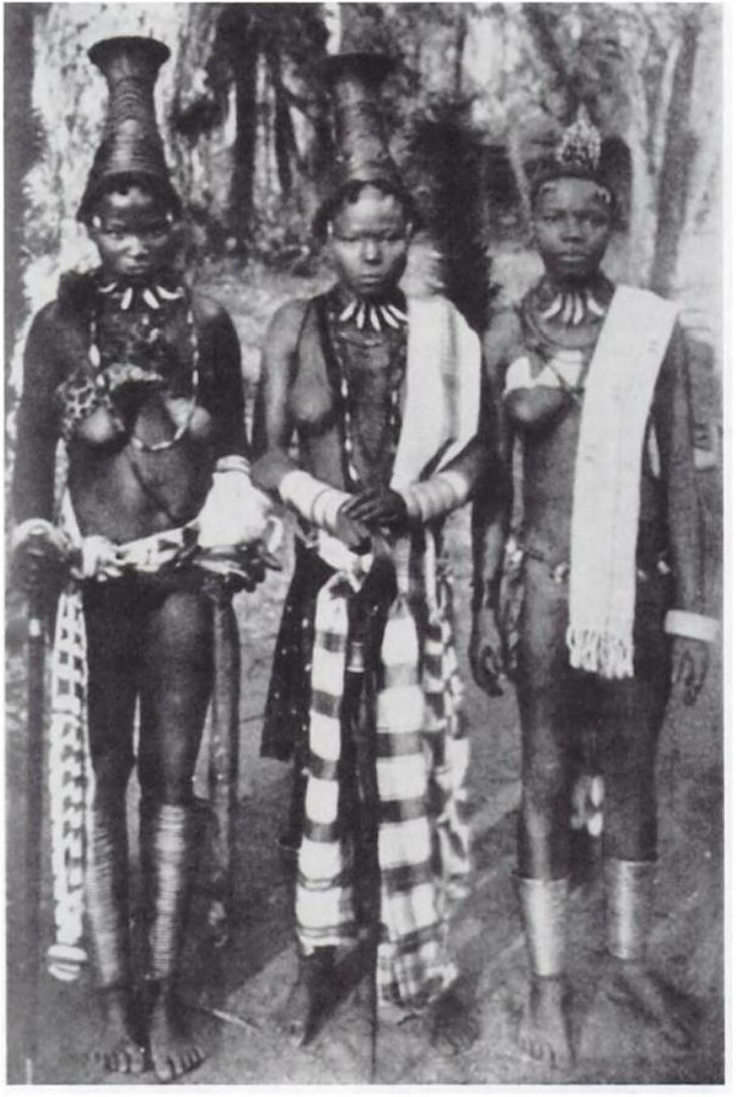
Igbo women adorned to show their high status

Nakedness and colonialism refers to the role of the unclothed bodies of Indigenous peoples in the history of contact with Western cultures and the emergence of concepts of race. In all human societies, bodily adornments of many kinds are part of nonverbal communications, indicating social status, wealth, and individuality. In climates that do not require clothing, Indigenous adornments are more often body paint, modifications such as tattoos and scarification, and jewelry, but they serve the same social functions as clothing.

Europeans made interpretations of indigenous nakedness based upon their own culture and experiences, which were ambivalent regarding nudity. In classical Greek and Roman cultures, nudity was normal in many situations, which were depicted in art. In classical antiquity, only the Abrahamic religions viewed the body as shameful, requiring modest dress except in private spaces or when segregated by sex. In post-classical history, public nudity became associated not only with low status, but with moral decay based upon Christian beliefs. With the rediscovery of Greek culture by the Western world during the Renaissance, the nude in art became idealized, but distinct from nakedness in everyday life.

In the tropical regions of Africa, the Americas, Asia, and Oceania, responses to encounters between Indigenous and Western cultures varied, and changed during the centuries of colonization, but were generally based upon the assumption of Western peoples and culture being more advanced. The effects of colonialism continue in contemporary non-Western societies. Outside urban areas, some retain or seek to reestablish Indigenous cultural practices that include traditional nakedness, while in cities, residents have generally adopted Western concepts of modest dress.

Contemporary Western tourists often come to the tropics with expectations not based on the authentic way of life of Indigenous peoples. Tourism companies may provide performances that satisfy these expectations, but also find resistance from groups within each country that have different conceptions of post-colonialism.

== Colonialism and undress ==
Colonialism is the domination of one culture by another, which has occurred throughout history as one society extended control over neighboring territories. This process expanded as technologies for navigation and transport allowed for contact with more distant parts of the world. The justifications of European expansion began in the 1500s in the context of religion and folklore that included beliefs in demons and half-human monsters. By the 18th century, European thought was embracing ideas of social progress from primitive to agriculture to industrialization. Many Europeans justified colonization as spreading civilization rather than as conquest.

Because clothing and body adornments are such an important part of non-verbal communications, the relative lack of body coverings was one of the first things explorers noticed when they encountered Indigenous peoples of the tropics. From the beginning with Columbus in the 15th century until the British in India in the 19th century, Europeans were concerned with attributing meaning to states of undress, which they did not see as a natural state for humans. Being properly dressed in Western cultures was so full of meanings that the scanty dress or nudity of others needed an explanation, which was generally provided by religion. One of the enduring stereotypes of non-Western others is the naked savage based upon the belief that clothes are the signifier of membership in a civilized society; the lack of clothes represented a complete lack of culture. In Victorian England, the naked body was a potential source of moral decay, which was domesticated by proper dress. Any glimpse of the body through improper clothing was a danger to sobriety, chastity, and social order. In The Voyage of the Beagle, Charles Darwin wrote of the indifference to nakedness among the natives of Tierra del Fuego, who "one can hardly make oneself believe are fellow creatures, and inhabitants of the same world".

Non-Western cultures during the early modern period were naked only by comparison to Western norms. The genitals or the entire lower body of adults might be covered in many situations, while the upper body of both men and women would usually be unclothed. However, lacking the Western concept of shame regarding the body, complete nudity in public for practical or ceremonial purposes was common. Children until puberty and sometimes women until marriage might be naked as having "nothing to hide".

=== Western ambivalence ===
Contact affected not only non-European cultures, but also caused European cultures to reevaluate what it means to be human. From the Ancient Greeks to the Medieval period, there had been a distinction between two types: civilized humans and barbarians who were human, but lacking in culture. The variety of human societies that became known in the early modern era produced additional distinctions, including those that colonizers saw as subhuman. Savages could be considered fully human, and thus capable of being brought into civilization by religious conversion, or an inferior breed to be enslaved or exterminated.

Western ambivalence about the human body could be expressed by responding to the nakedness of natives as either a sign of rampant sexuality or of the innocence that preceded the fall of man. The ambivalence of the West included geography and biology. Some imagined the tropics as "paradise" but others viewed it as primitive, and temperate climates as more complex. In the 19th century, with the acceptance of evolutionary theory, it was recognized that humanity had originated in the tropics based on anatomical similarities to apes.

Charles Darwin thought that it was migration to less hospitable climates that offered the challenges that promoted the development of modern humans. Lacking knowledge of genetics, beliefs regarding the origin of humans tended toward polygenism, that each race of humans had been a separate creation, which fit with belief in Europeans being a distinct and superior race. Darwin favored monogenism, that humans had a single common ancestor. Monogenism in the form of the recent African origin of modern humans is the dominant theory among contemporary paleoanthropologists.

=== Changing concepts of race ===
From the 17th century, European explorers viewed the lack of clothing they encountered in Africa and Oceania as representative of a primitive state of nature, justifying their own superiority, even as they continued to admire the beauty of Greek statues. A distinction was made by Europeans between idealized nudity in art and the nakedness of Indigenous people, which was uncivilized and indicative of racial inferiority.

In the late 19th century, British scientists, including Thomas Henry Huxley, were using nude photographs of natives supplied by the British Colonial Office as evidence for theories of race based upon comparative anatomy. Photographing naked natives also became popular with non-scientists such as travel writers and missionaries, who used the link between indigenous nudity and science to justify the display of images that would otherwise be classified as obscene. Eventually, such images became widely distributed as curiosities, spreading the idea that colonized peoples were naked savages.

Depictions of natives by Europeans
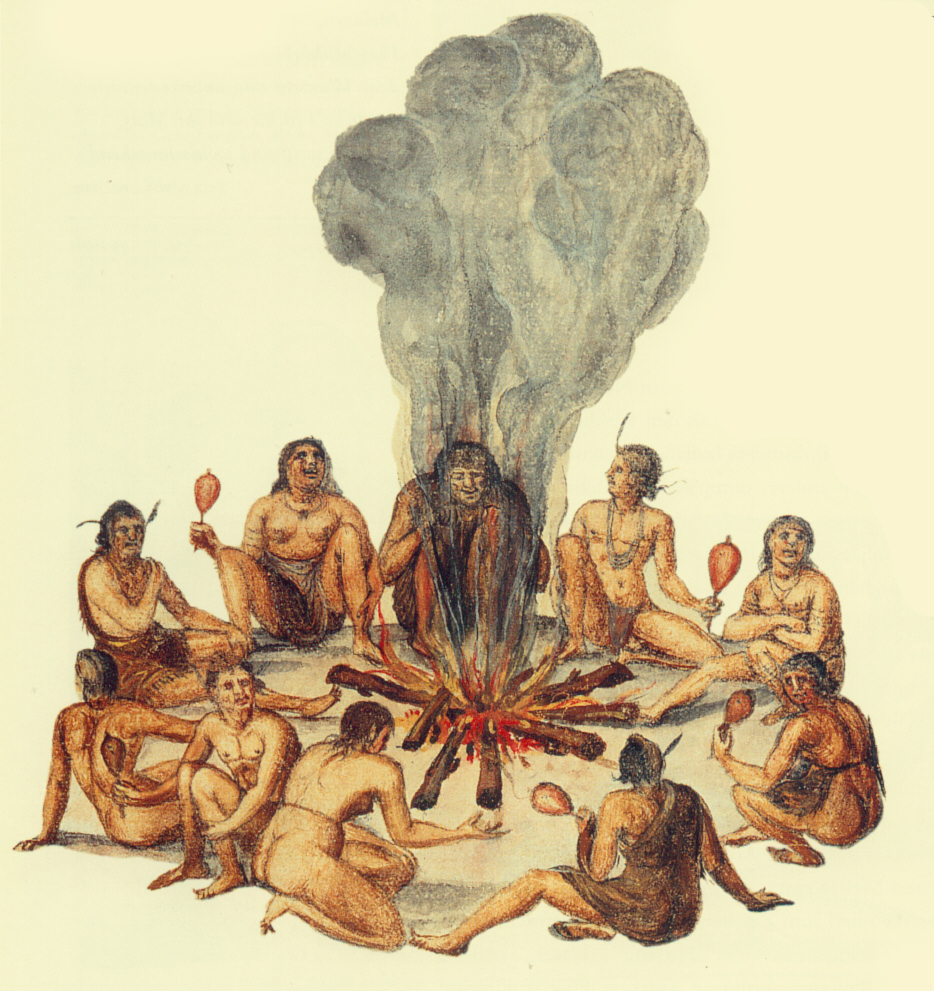
Ceremony of Secotan warriors in North Carolina by John White, 1585

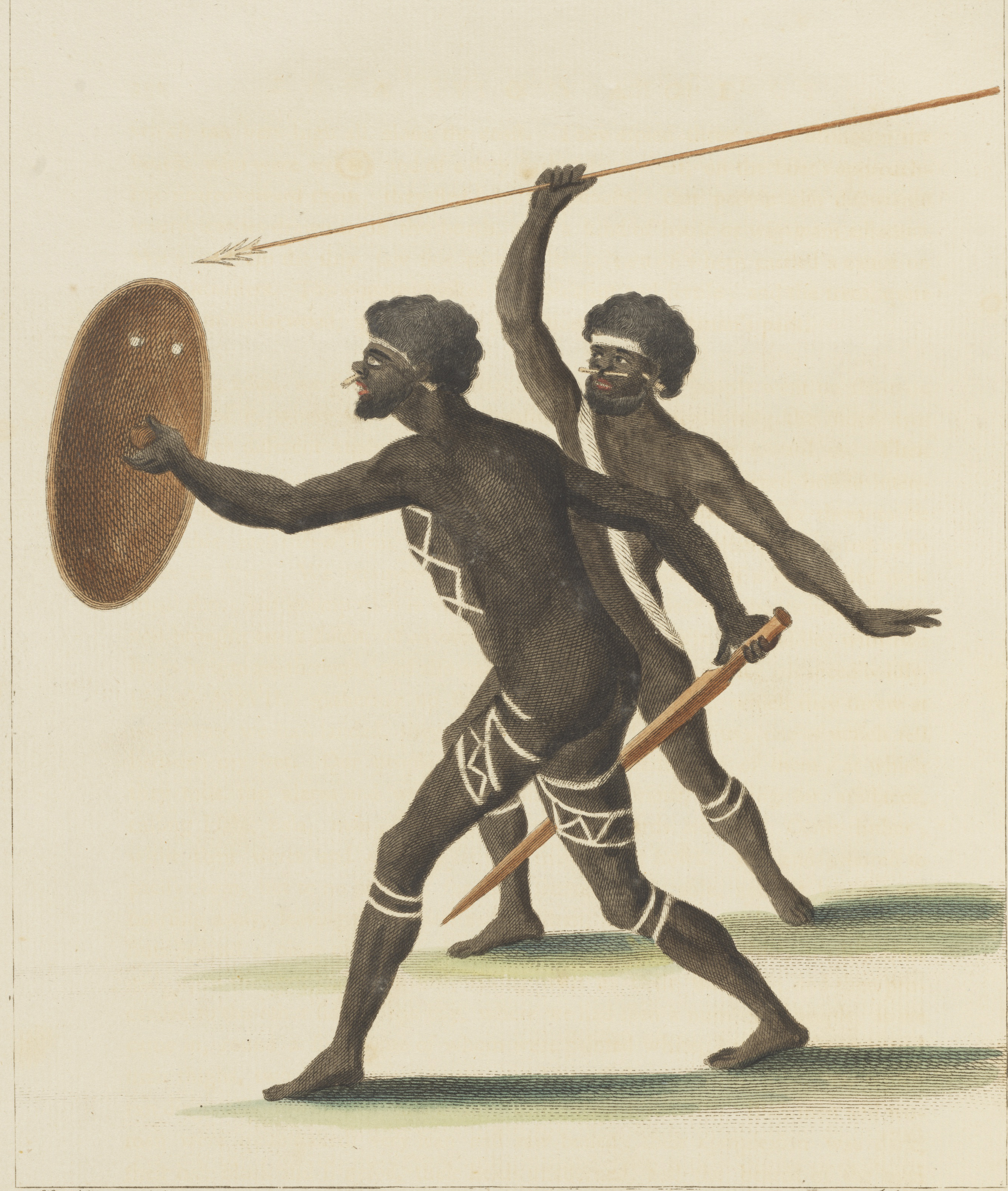
Two of the Natives of New Holland, Advancing to Combat by Sydney Parkinson, 1773

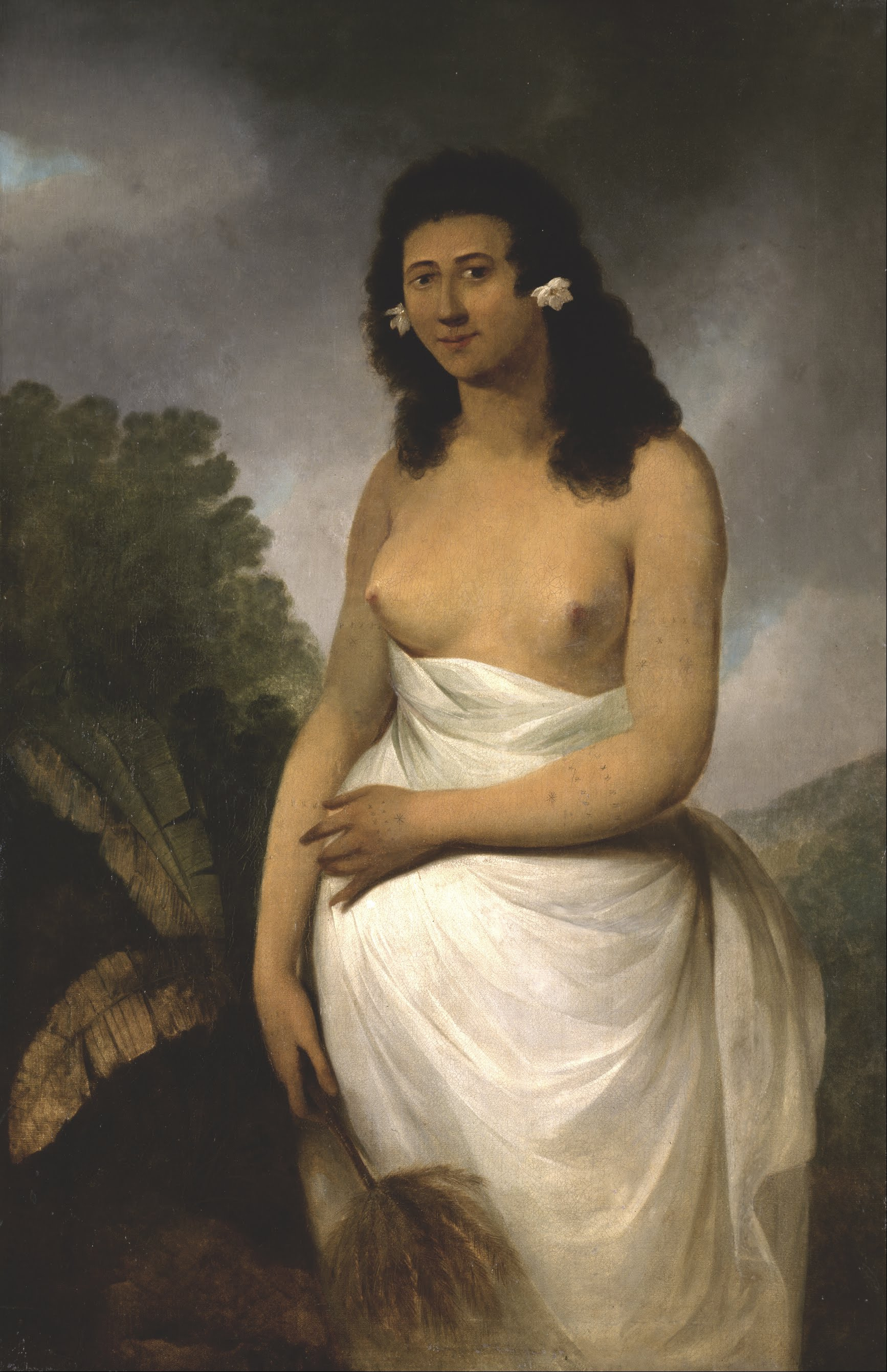
Portrait of Poedooa, daughter of Orea, King of Ulaitea, Society Islands (c. 1782-85) by John Webber

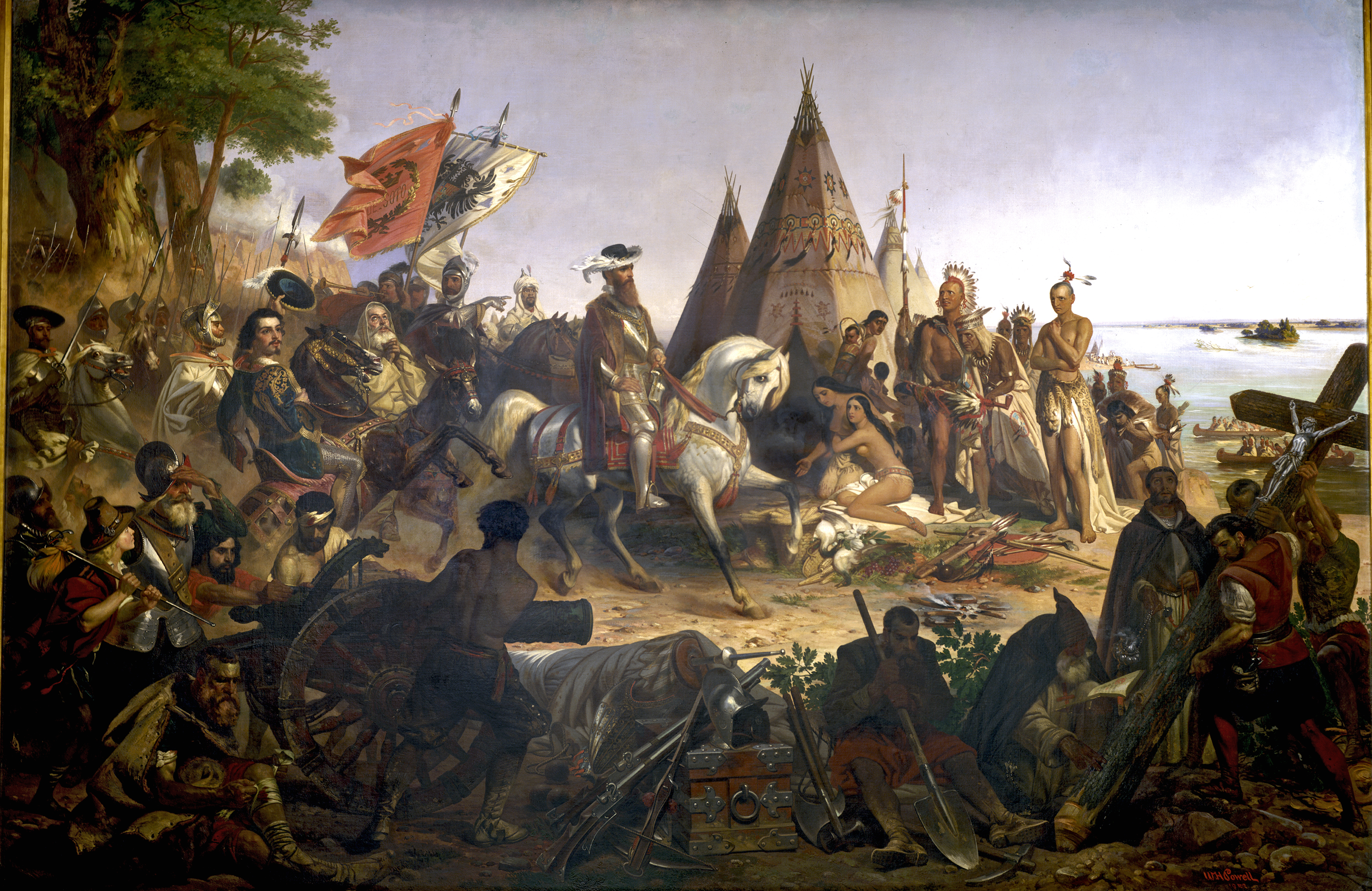
Discovery of the Mississippi by De Soto by William Henry Powell, 1853

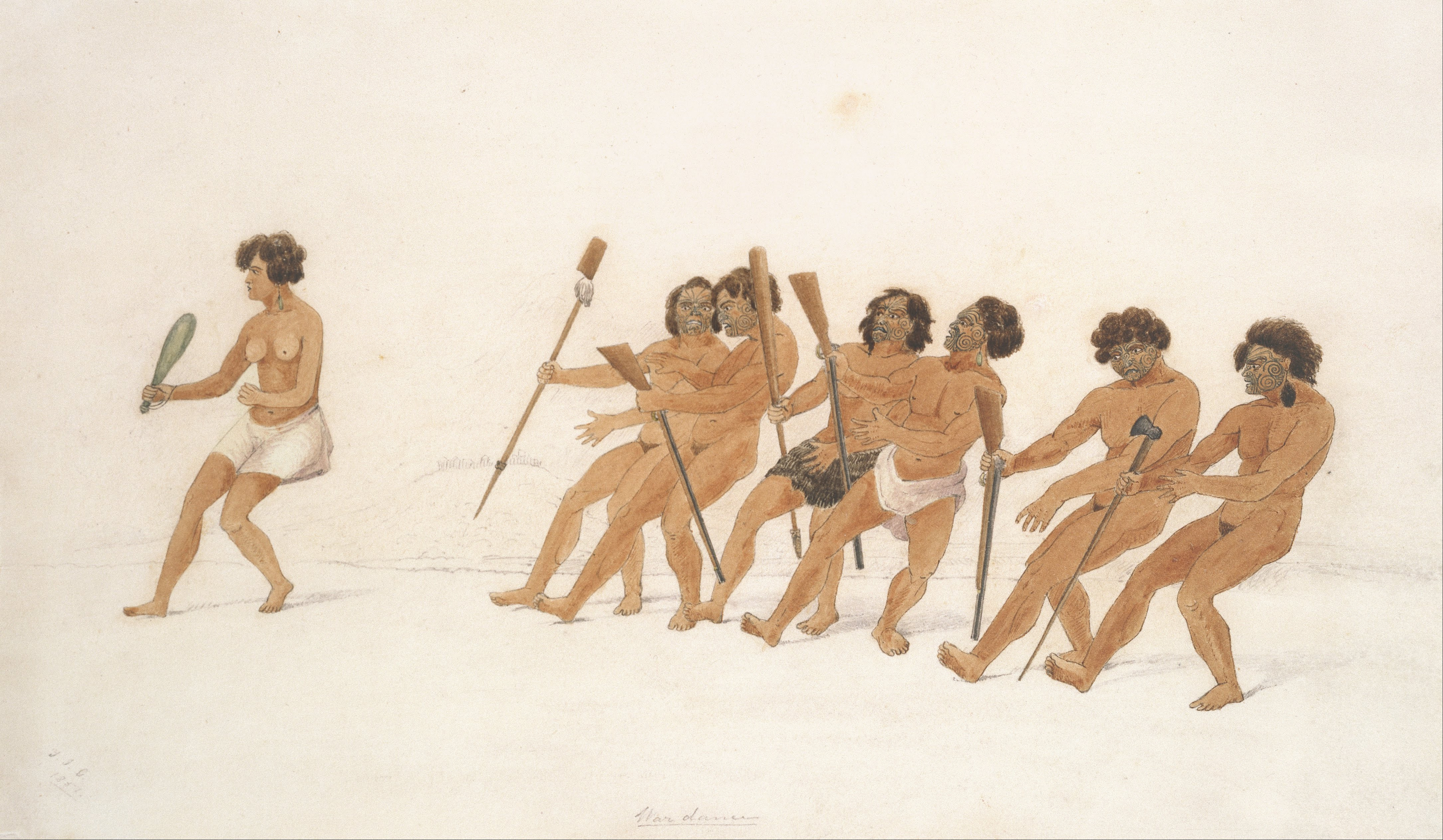
War Dance by Thomas John Grant, New Zealand, 1857

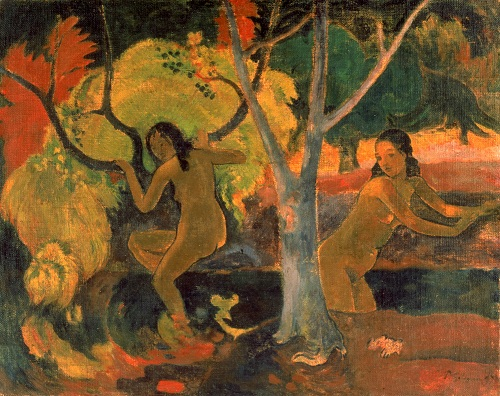
Bathers in Tahiti by Paul Gauguin, 1897

== Colonialism and skin color ==
Both nakedness and skin color are markers of difference which combined or diverged in particular circumstances. Blackness was a factor in contact between cultures based upon a biblical interpretations that had been used historically by Europeans to explain the existence of black people. The modern concept of race as innate had begun to emerge in the 15th century with the establishment of a Christian kingdom in Spain, expelling the Jews and Muslims. Although there had been many converts, lineage became the test of inclusion in the kingdom rather than profession of faith. As the natural sciences developed, humans were divided into groups based upon additional characteristics such as facial features and hair texture, not by skin tone alone.

Some Indigenous peoples have skin no darker than that of Southern Europeans, or among workers tanned by the sun, thus their nakedness was interpreted as being of low status. In combination with nakedness, the darker skin and other superficial differences in African and Australian peoples could be interpreted as their being less than human. Another contributing factor was the assumption, with or without cause, that Indigenous peoples were also dirty, the addition of public and private baths in the 19th century having made Europeans conscious of the benefits of good hygiene. However, anthropologists have noted that many non-Western societies have elaborate rituals of bathing and purification.

The Indigenous people of the Americas did not fit easily into existing categories. Columbus noted that they were physically attractive, with "fine bodies and handsome faces" but entirely lacking in clothing or other signs of human culture. Amerigo Vespucci found danger of seduction in the beauty of native women. The historical ambivalence of Europeans toward nudity led to alternative views of natives as innocent or sinful. Conceptions of the naked savage prevailed, the concept of the noble savage failing to serve the purposes of colonial control.

In the Pacific Islands, where colonization occurred later in the era, the darker skin of natives became a garment. The lack of clothing, in particular, women not covering their breasts, was no longer noticed by some Europeans after a time of adjustment.

== Africa ==
In some parts of Sub-Saharan Africa, except for Islamic countries, nudity is not solely sexual, but varies in social meaning from one cultural group to another. In some rural villages, both boys and girls are allowed to be nude while playing, based upon a belief that the young are innocent of negative feelings or sexual urges. Some women also bare their breasts as a symbol of their nurturing children. While recognizing that some behaviors may be obscene, mere nudity has no moral connotations.

Two contemporary Nigerian theologians have found agreement regarding modest dress in some traditional African practices and Judeo-Christian values, and see globalization as eroding both. With the passage of a dress code in Uganda that is enforced in the cities of Kampala and Entebbe, it is now European visitors that are often seen as improperly dressed.

In the 19th century, colonial imposition of European clothes was the first step in converting Africans to Christianity. At the same time, photographs of naked Indigenous peoples began circulating in Europe without a clear distinction between those created as commercial curiosities (or erotica) and those claiming to be scientific, or ethnographic images. Given the state of photography, it is unclear which images were posed, rather than being representative of everyday attire.

=== East Africa ===
In traditional societies of East Africa, such as the Samburu and Turkana in Kenya, the Nuba of Southern Sudan, and many others, continue to dress appropriately for the climate, often entirely naked while working or bathing. In 2014, the parliament of Uganda passed an anti-pornography law which included a dress code outlawing "immoral" clothing that exposes the intimate parts of the body. This law was enforced in the capital, Kampala, by male vigilantes, while the Karamajong people continued to dress untouched by western values, but celebrate the human body and acceptance of nakedness. The national dress code was defended as addressing the problem of sexual assaults, which women protested, pointing out that it not only unfairly placed the responsibility for assaults on women rather than men, but was inconsistent with the fact that for centuries women had worn little clothing, but rape had been rare.

=== Southern Africa ===
The South African province of Natal (now KwaZulu-Natal) was a British colony until 1994. The Christian missionaries among the white colonial minority pursued the policy of civilizing the Zulu majority, imposing Western clothing being a visible symbol of this effort. Indigenous peoples resisted by either wearing clothing inappropriately or reverting to their traditional attire when not at the mission station.

An annual event that draws thousands of participants and spectators is Umkhosi woMhlanga or "Reed Dance" in Eswatini. Zulu girls participate in a ceremony representing their pledge to virginity before marriage, wearing traditional dress which does not cover their breasts. At tourist "villages" that are part of resorts, Zulu teenage girls perform bare-chested. While primarily seeing this as an expression of their culture, they are not unaware of being sexualized by male tourists.

=== West Africa ===
In travels in Mali in the 1350s, Muslim scholar Ibn Battuta was shocked by the casual relationships between men and women even at the court of Sultans, and the public nudity of female slaves and servants.

Indigenous peoples of West Africa
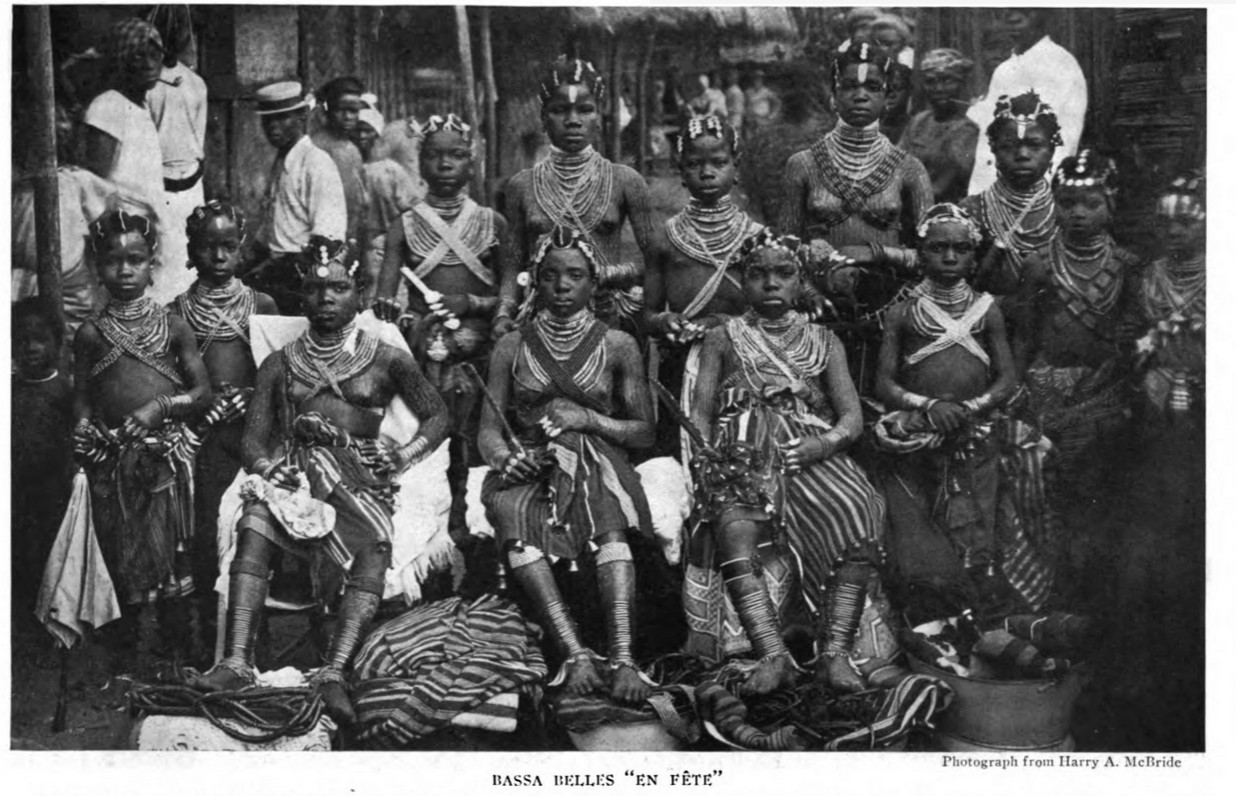
“Bassa women” - from: National Geographic Magazine, Vol XLII, November 1922.

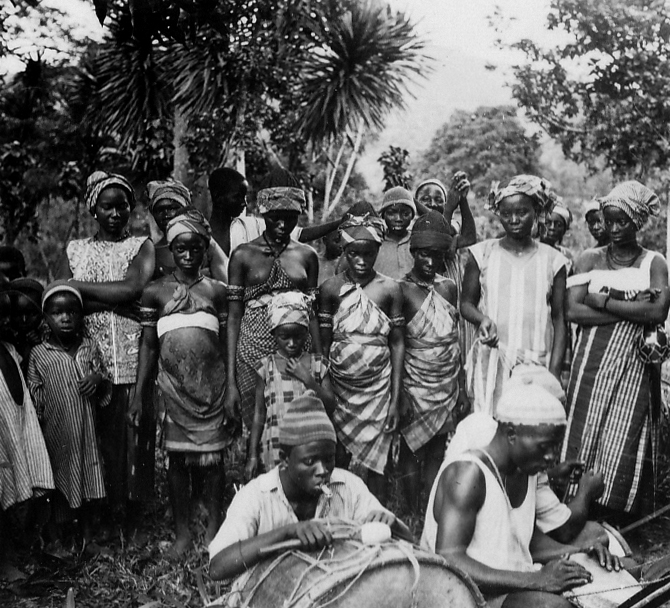
Musicians, Sierra Leone, 1936

George Basden, a missionary and ethnographer who lived with the Igbo people of Nigeria published two volumes of photographs in the 1920s and 1930s. The book described images of unclothed but elaborately decorated Igbo women as indicating their high status as eligible brides who would not have thought of themselves as naked. Igbo men were also dressed to indicate their status, but young men with no status were often entirely naked while laboring in fields. Igbo infants and boys were generally naked, while girls wore minimal adornments.

Ethnographic research with members of the Anaang people of Nigeria was welcomed in 1950-51, when elders of the tribe wanted their history and culture recorded due to the threat of Westernization. There were many who remembered the arrival of the first white people in 1901. People of all ages and genders openly talked of sexual beliefs and behavior. Such talks were in keeping with the Anaang's own customs of passing on cultural traditions. Before colonization, all children were naked until puberty, after which young men wore only a loincloth, and women wore a small cloth until marriage. Girls wore beads around their waists and ankles. Adult clothing for both sexes was a cloth that reached from the waist to the ground. The cloth is long enough to cover women's breasts, but this is not done while working. Having no shame in the body, both sexes openly bathed nude. Brides dance nude at their wedding, prior to being given their first adult clothing. The western researchers saw the bridal dance as sexual, but the members of the tribe said it was not. Norms of sexual behavior were strict, premarital intercourse being frowned upon and adultery being a crime, although polygyny is practiced.

With the independence of Ghana from English rule in 1957, the first Prime Minister Kwame Nkrumah and his political party began a program that sought to eliminate undesirable practices, including female genital mutilation, human trafficking, prostitution, and nudity. Nudity was practiced by the Frafra, Dagarti, Kokomba, Builsa, Kassena, and Lobi peoples in the Northern and Upper Regions of the country. Although the stated opposition to nudity was its association with harmful practices, its prevalence as a tradition was seen as detrimental to Ghana's reputation in the world and economic development, nakedness being associated with primitive backwardness. However, anti-nudity efforts also promoted the equal status of women. Some traditional practices remain, the Sefwi people of Ghana performing a ritual, "Bo Me Truo" that includes dancing, singing, and drama by nude women to avert disaster and promote fertility.

Traditional dress in some contemporary African ethnic groups
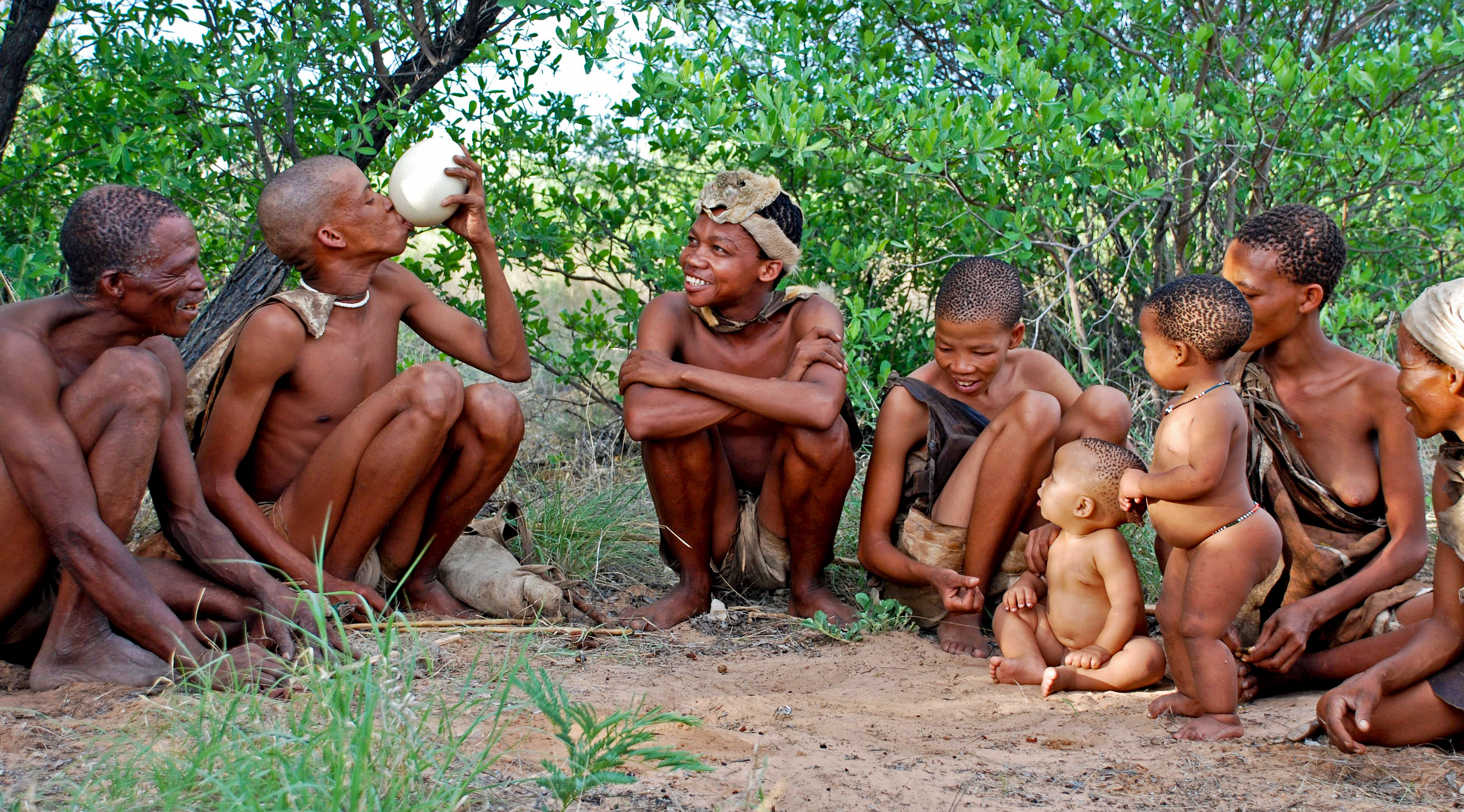
San people of South Africa

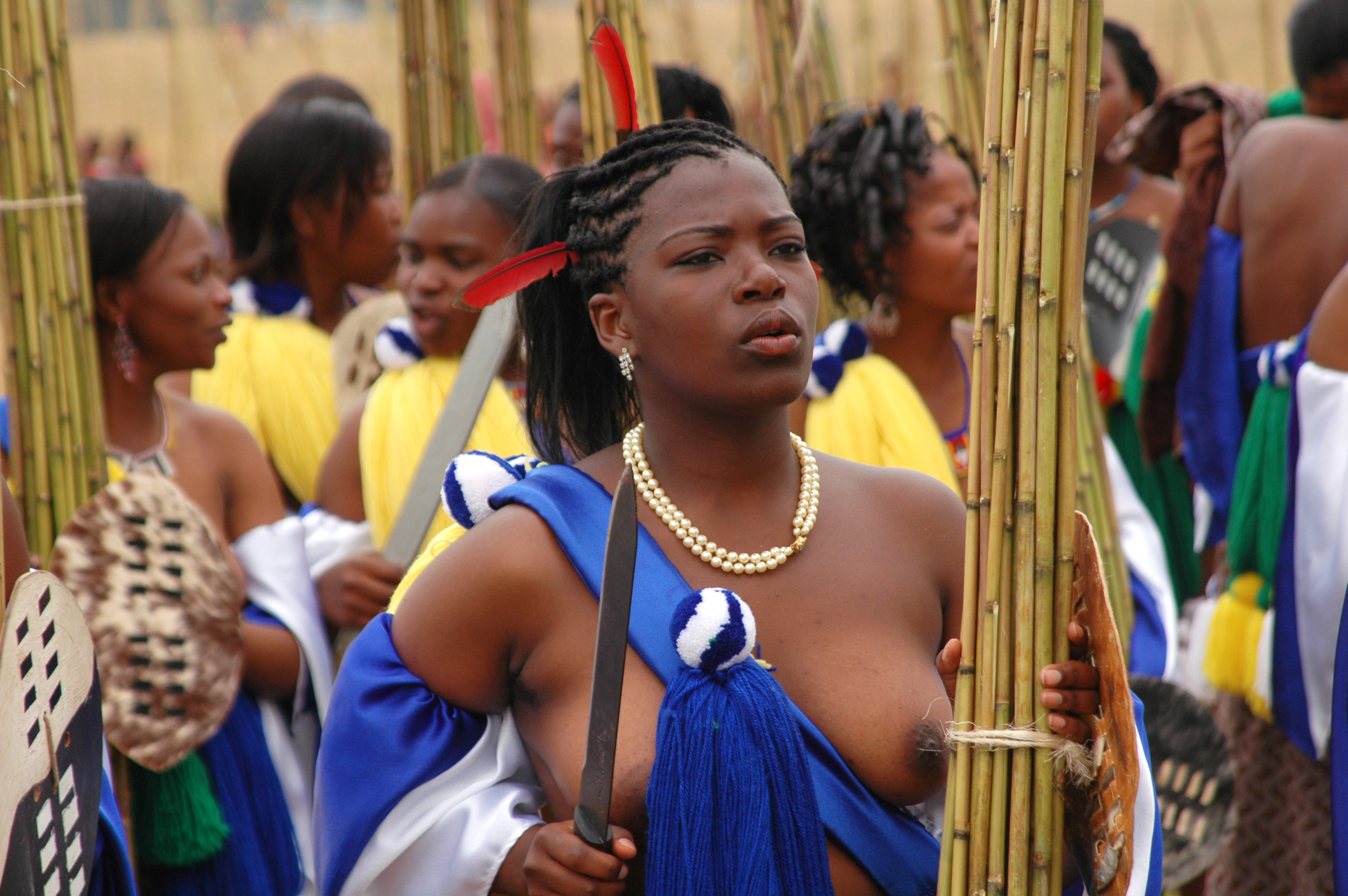
A Swazi woman participating in the Umhlanga ceremony in Eswatini – 2006

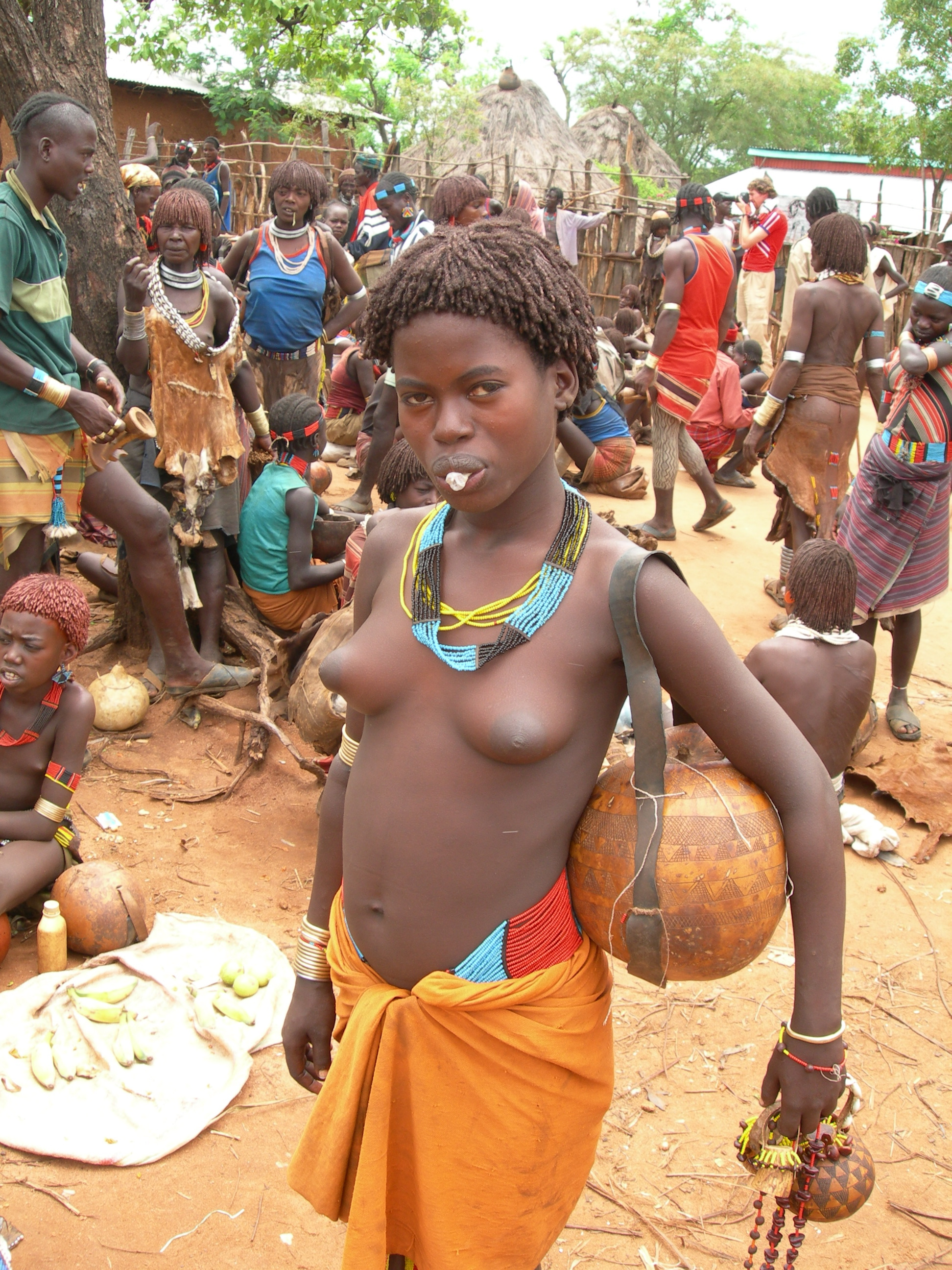
Young Hamer woman in southern Ethiopia (near Turmi) – 2006

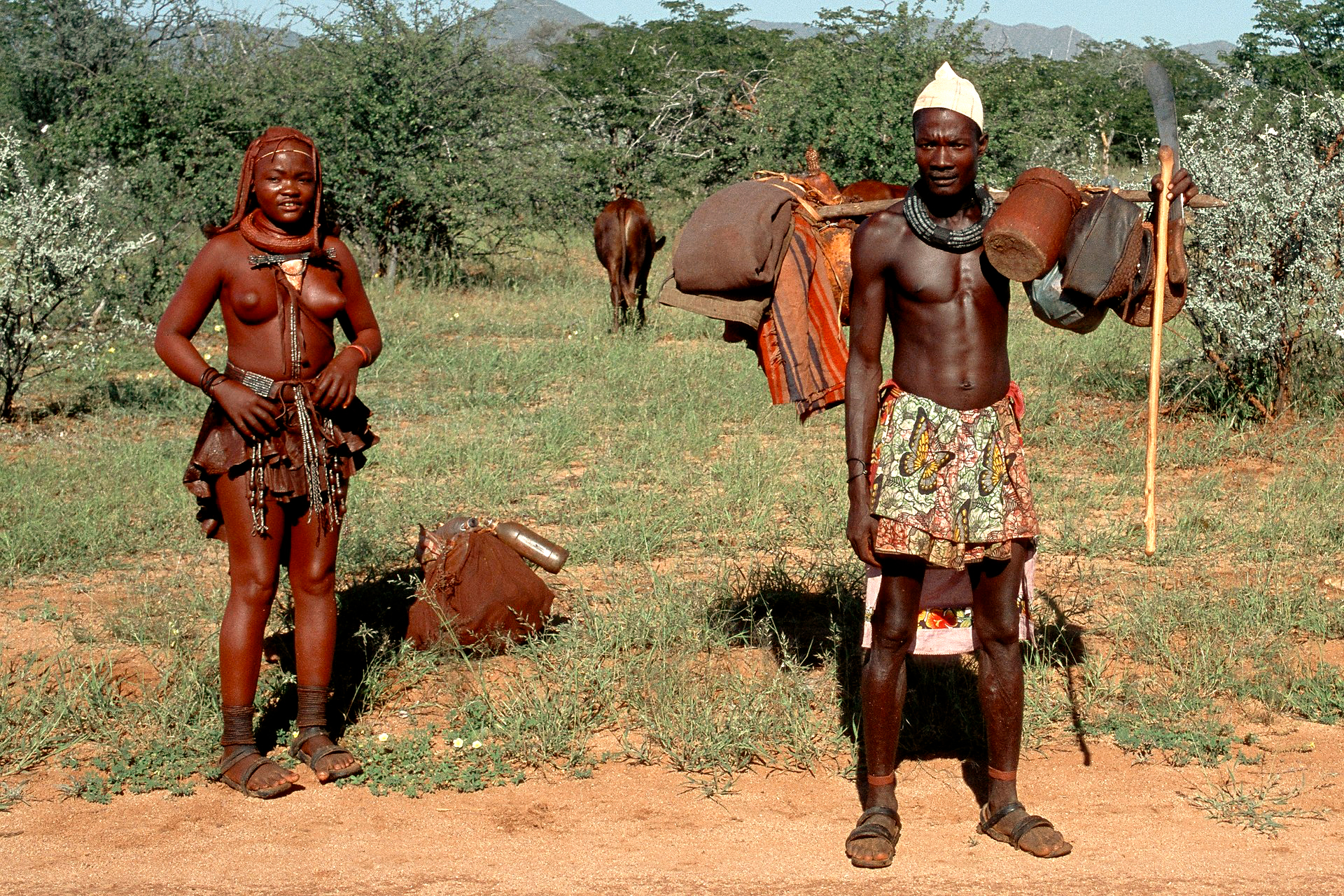
Himba herders of the Kaokoveld desert

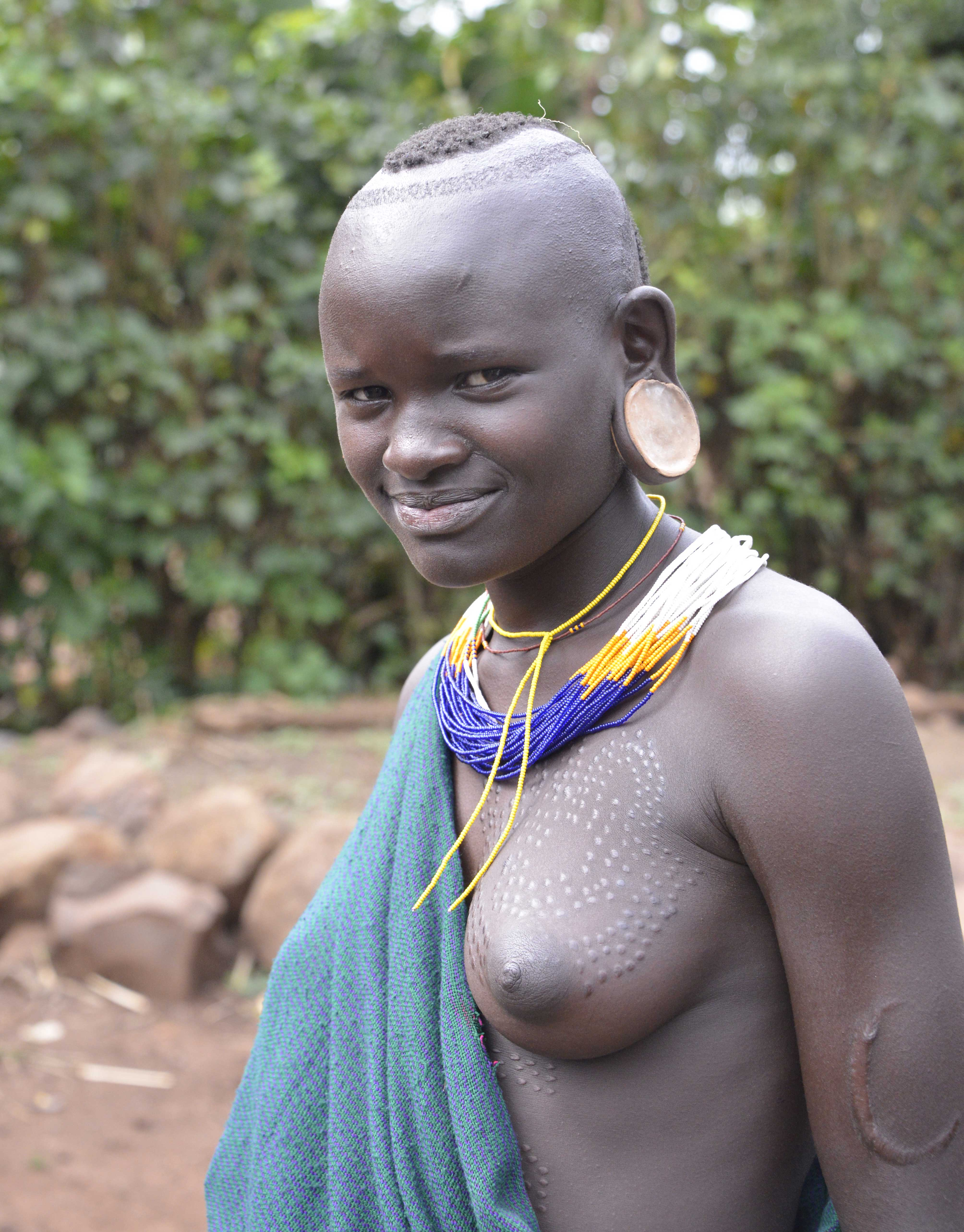
Beauty Scarification, Suri Tribe, Ethiopia - 2016

== The Americas ==
Although credited with the discovery of the Americas, Christopher Columbus had little importance in the subsequent history of the continents. He was not interested in the land or people, but in finding resources to exploit and establishing trade. He never gave up the idea that the lands he encountered were part of Asia. In his diaries, Columbus writes that the natives of Guanahani, his first landing, were entirely naked, both men and women, and gentle. This also meant that they were seen as less than fully human and exploitable.

=== North America ===
Indigenous peoples of the Americas had no associations of sexuality or nudity with shame or sin. European colonizers became aware of other practices, including premarital and extramarital sex, homosexuality, and cross-dressing, that motivated their efforts to convert natives to Christianity. However, characterization of others as savage may have been to justify conquest and displacement. In his diaries during an expedition to the Pacific coast in 1791, Alejandro Malaspina writes of the European response to the nakedness and odd dress of the southwest natives, ranging from amusement to hostility, and Western clothes being a metaphor for civilization. He was particularly disturbed by some native men dressing as women.

The Aztec city Tenochtitlán reached a population of eighty thousand before the arrival of the Spanish in 1520. Built on an island in Lake Texcoco, it was dependent upon hydraulic engineering for agriculture, which also supplied bathing facilities with both steam baths (temazcales) and tubs. The conquistadors viewed indigenous bathing practices, which included both men and women entering temazcales naked, in terms of paganism and sexual immorality, and sought to eradicate them. In the Yucatan, Mayan men and women bathed in rivers with little concern for modesty. Yet in spite of the number of hot springs in the region, there is no mention of their use for bathing by Indigenous peoples.

Many early colonists did not view Native Americans as distinctly different in color from themselves, and thus could be assimilated into colonial society following conversion. Colonists could view natives as either docile or violent, justifying their preference for conversion or extermination. Roger Williams of Rhode Island, rare among the Puritans, noted the innocence of natives compared to Europeans, indicating that nakedness nullified sexuality rather than promoting it.

=== South America ===
==== Brazil ====
Some Indigenous peoples of the Amazon remained uncontacted into the 20th century, maintaining their cultural traditions, including minimal dress typical of hot, humid climates. Now, their contact with outsiders is mainly loggers exploiting the forest.

== Asia ==
Nudity in Asia
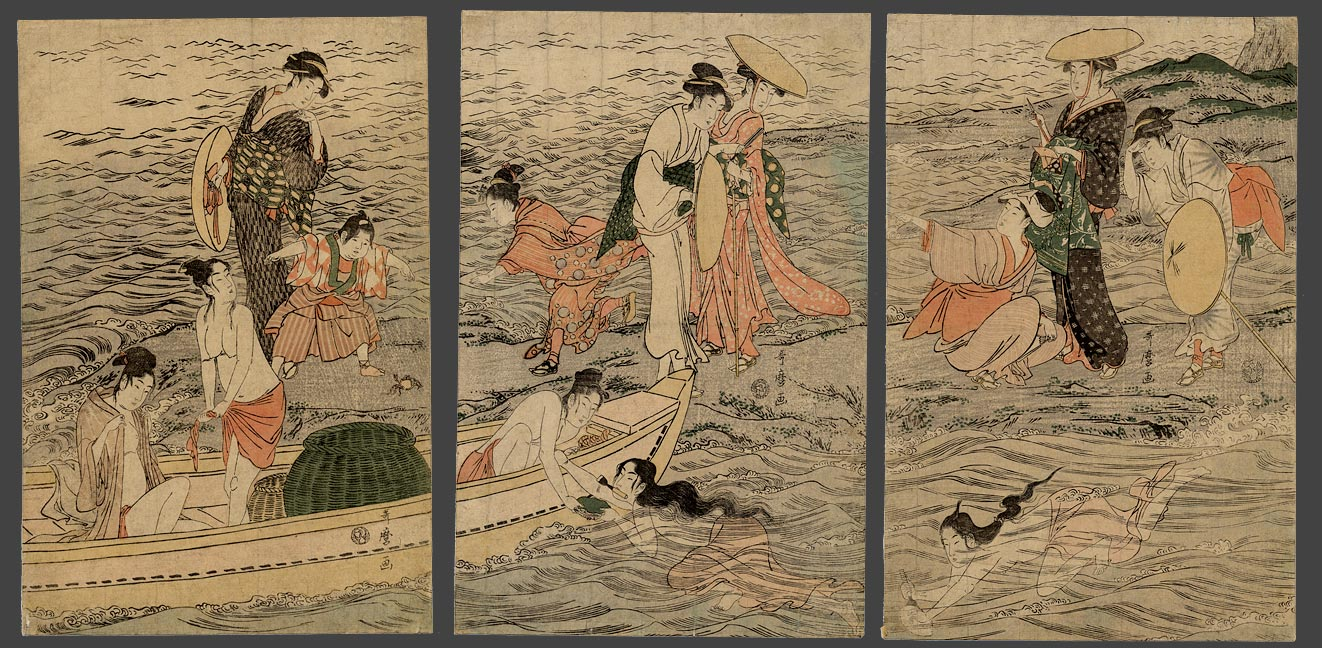
Triptych Ukiyo-e print of Japanese ama divers catching abalone (1788–1790) by Utamaro

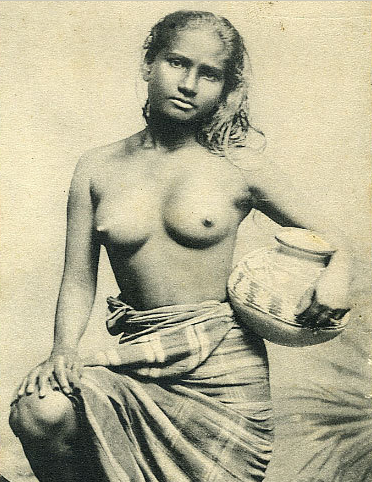
Rodiya women from Sri Lanka (c. 1910)

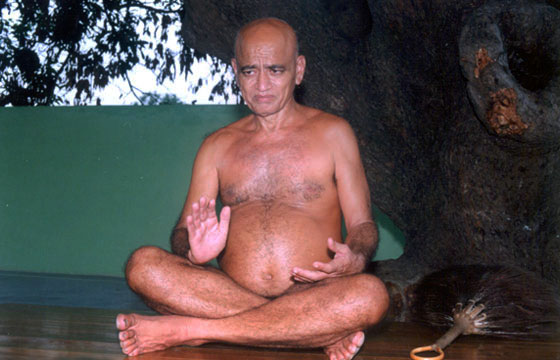
Acharya Vidyasagar, a contemporary Digambara Jain monk

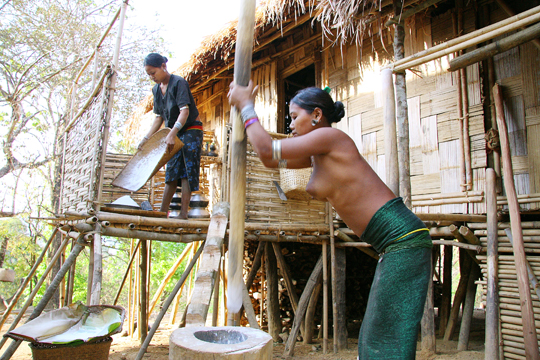
Mru women working in Bangladesh

=== India ===
Originally women often wore a sari that exposed their breasts.

In the British colonial period (1858-1947), people in northern India dressed modestly, but might bath nude in rivers. Indigenous peoples in southern tropical zones continued to be naked, but prior to Western colonization, some had already adopted more modest dress with the spread of Hinduism.

=== Japan ===
Although Japan was a colonizer of other societies, and not colonized by Europeans, the opening of Japan to visitors in the Meiji era (1868–1912) brought Western influences. The previously normal states of undress and the custom of mixed public bathing became an issue for leaders concerned with Japan's international reputation. Although often ignored or circumvented, the laws against nudity had the effect of sexualizing the body in situations that had not previously been erotic.

=== Korea ===
During the late Joseon period and before the Korean war, hanbok (dress) exposing the breast was the norm among commoner women. It was explained by the foreign observers that the women, being proud to have children, especially sons, bared their breasts. It spread as a mode of dressing among common women, and was seen in women of all ages, even past child rearing ages in pictures.

=== Sri Lanka ===
In Sri Lanka, upper body nudity had been historically acceptable for both men and women. During the British colonial period, the Diyareddha, a traditional female bathing garment and upper body nudity among lower cast females was tolerated even though the Vagrants Ordinance No 4 of 1841 outlawed public nudity and indecency.

=== Southeast Asia ===
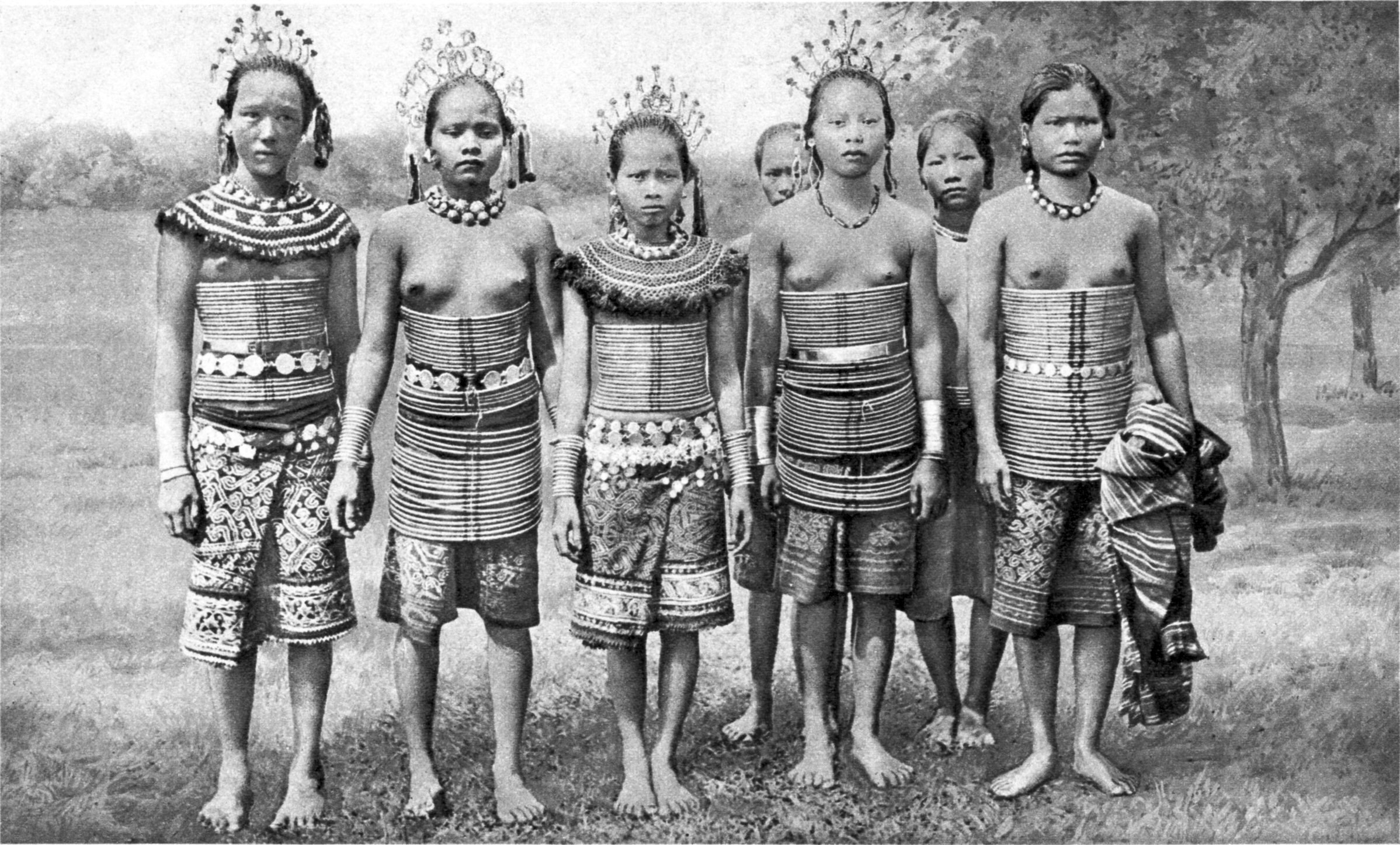
Sea Dayaks (Iban) women from Malaysia (1910)

== Oceania ==
The introduction of woven cloth to the Pacific islands had varied effects in different cultures. While missionaries viewed body coverings in terms of progress toward conversion to Christianity, native cultures integrated the new technology into their existing customs of body adornment. Pre-contact clothing was made from bark cloth, which is fragile, particularly when wet. The new cloth was popular, but used only when needed, which did not include preserving modesty, and thus could be removed as necessary.

=== Australia ===
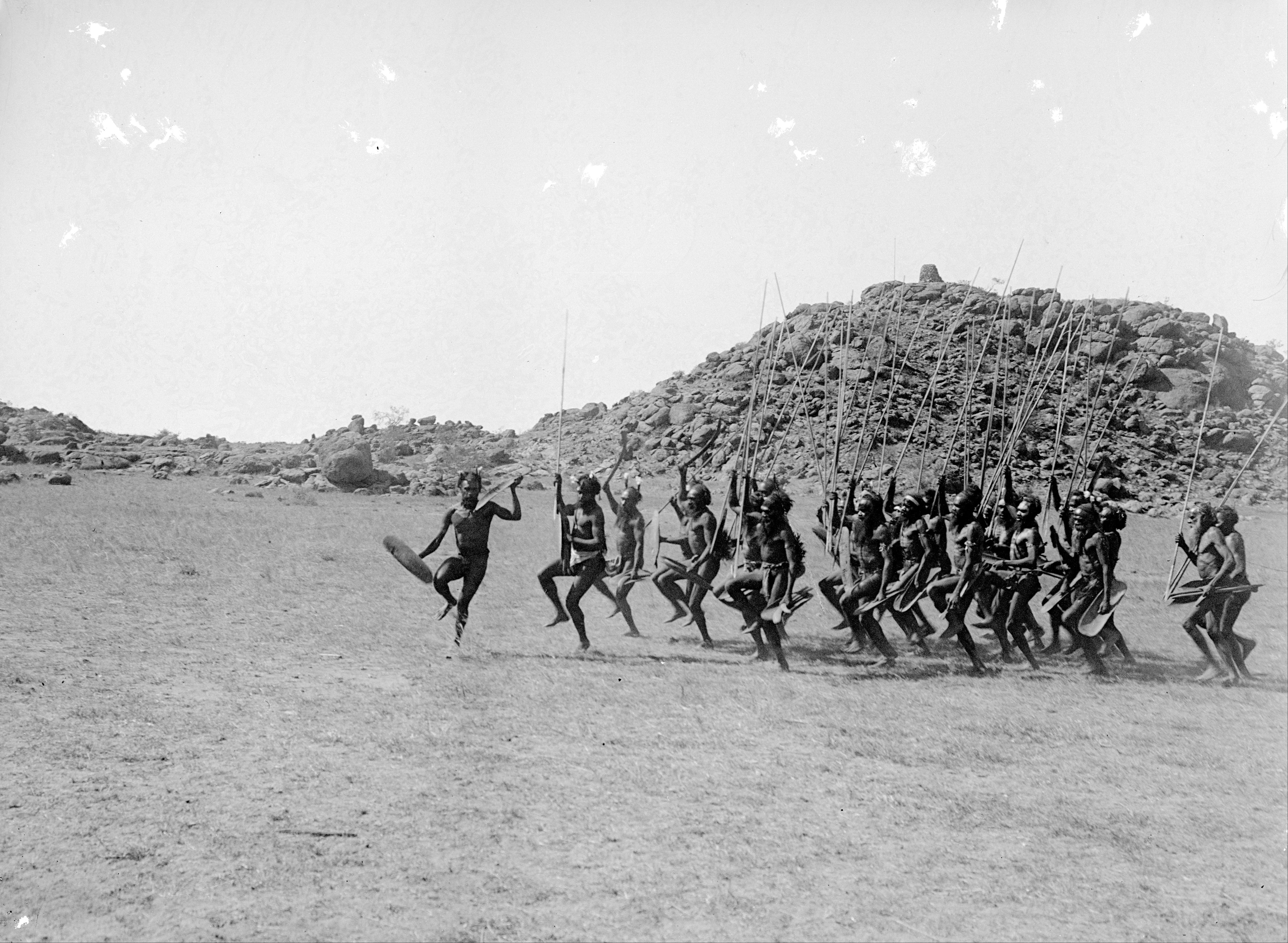
Arrernte people welcoming dance, Alice Springs, Central Australia, 9 May 1901

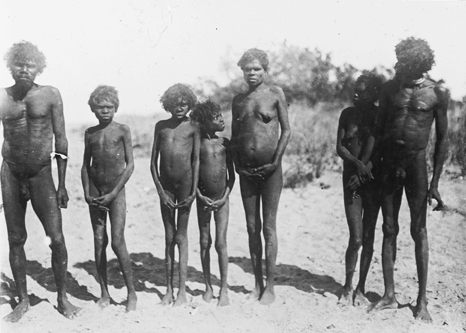
Aboriginal people at Cape Dombey, north of Port Keats, Northern Territory (1905)

Aboriginal Australians in 1819 wore only the jackets they were given, but not pants.

Missionaries and anthropologists came to Central Australia much later than other regions; it was sparsely populated due to scarce water resources. The first Europeans arrived in the late 1870s, with a second wave in the 1930s. Aboriginal peoples welcomed clothing, but used it as decorations rather than to cover their nakedness, which was disconcerting to outsiders. The 19th century missionaries pursued a policy of cultural conversion that included proper dress, but in the 20th century, anthropologists were more accepting of nakedness.

In an autobiography by an Arrernte man in 1950, he does not describe his people as naked. Instead, he reports that children were taught behaviors appropriate to each gender that maintained modesty without clothing, such as sitting facing away from others. These behaviors were not known or understood by Europeans at the time. He also described the missionaries trying to prevent an Arrernte ceremony which involved the men being naked with their bodies painted with sacred markings. The missionaries refused to give them food until they had dressed.

As the 20th century continued, it was found that clothing had results that were the opposite of what was intended. When aboriginal children had grown up naked, they had little interest in sexuality until adulthood, but clothing made them more sexually aware and precocious.

=== Indonesia ===
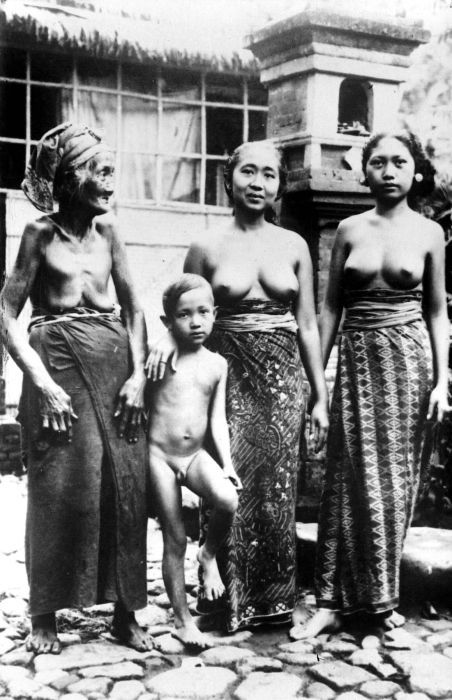
Group portrait of a Balinese family (1929)

==== Bali ====
A book by a German national serving as a medical doctor in the Netherlands East Indies army between 1912 and 1914 describes the island of Bali as an "Eden" for Western visitors. His praise includes the beauty of Balinese women, who were bare-breasted in everyday life and unclothed while bathing. Both men and women covered their upper bodies in some situations, such as in a temple.

Soon, the Dutch colonial administration began issuing conflicting orders regarding proper dress, which had limited effect due to some Balinese supporting tradition, others modernization. In this century, the norms for dress have been reversed, Balinese becoming conservative, while tourists need to be told that nude swimming is illegal, and swimwear is not appropriate off the beach.

=== Melanesia ===
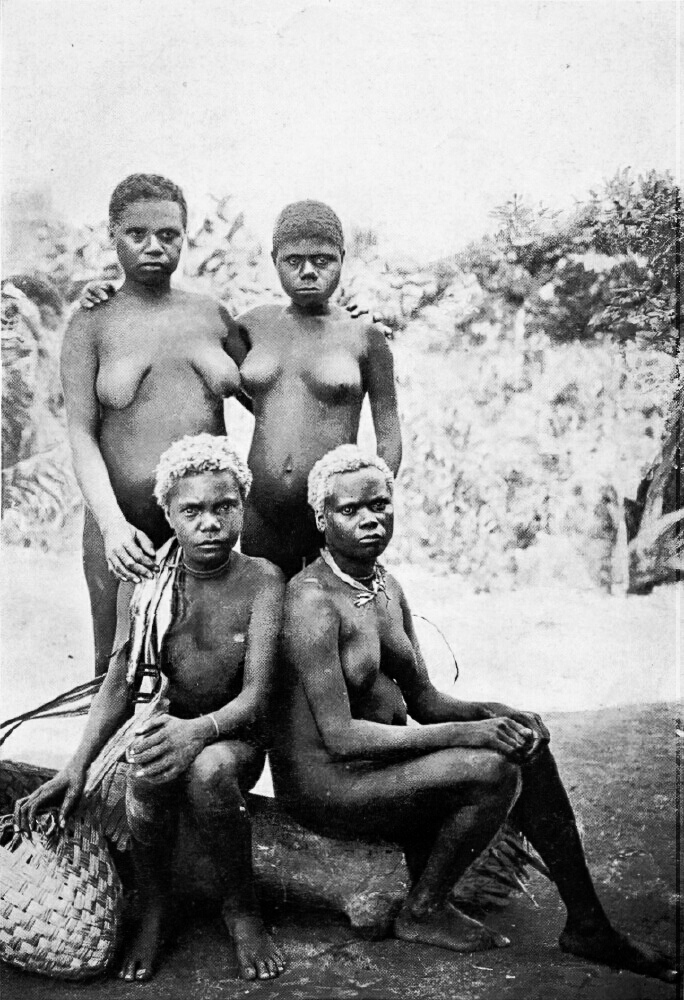
Women of Mioko Island, Papua New Guinea, c. 1900

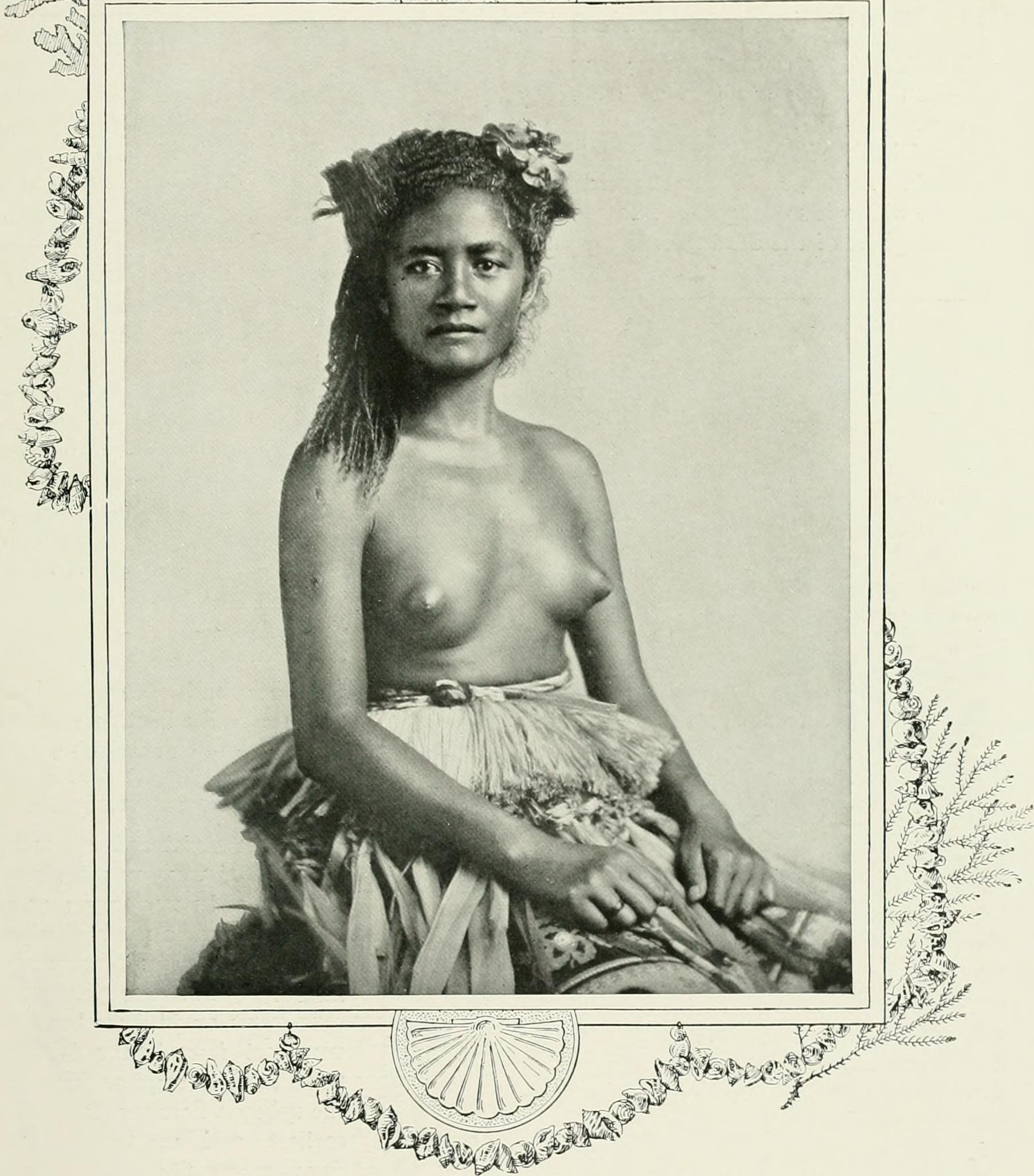
Fijian girl (1908)

=== Micronesia ===
In Yap State, Catholic services for Christmas and Easter include dances performed by women in traditional dress that do not cover their breasts.

=== Polynesia ===
Depictions of naked savages entered European popular culture in the 18th century in popular stories of tropical islands. In particular, Europeans became fascinated by the image of the Pacific island woman with bare breasts. While much was made of Polynesian nakedness, European cloth was welcomed as part of traditions of wrapping the body. Into the 20th century, the people of Pukapuka continued to be naked until adulthood.

==== Hawaii ====
Christian missionaries had a great influence, establishing alternative villages for their families, building schools as well as churches, and employing native women as domestics. Proper dress was a prerequisite for receiving these benefits, although not observed consistently. Hawaiian women thought of clothes as decoration, not for covering their nakedness, and often removed them for work or bathing.

The practice of surfing originally was part of native ritual, and was done naked. This was forbidden by Christian missionaries, putting an end to surfing for a period of time.

==== New Zealand ====
Māori people prior to European colonization wore woven cloaks and kilts for protection from the weather and to denote social status. However, very little of the human body had to be concealed for modesty's sake. In informal settings, men went naked except for a belt with a piece of string attached holding their foreskin shut over their glans penis. Women covered their pubic area with small aprons or bunches of fragrant plant material when in the presence of men – although these parts could be exposed in the gesture of contempt known as whakapohane. Pre-pubescent children wore no clothes at all. There was no shame or modesty attached to women's breasts, and therefore no garments devoted to concealing them; the colourful woven bodices (pari) now worn in kapa haka performances became standard costume only in the 1950s.

The European colonists regarded nudity as an obscenity. The nakedness of Māori was cited, often in the phrase "naked savages", as a sign of their racial inferiority, which in turn was seen as casting into doubt the validity of the Treaty of Waitangi.

== Works cited ==
- Adeyanju, James Olubbenga; Bello, Ben Olusoa (2017). "Biblical Virtues, African Culture, and Globalization". Afro Asian Journal of Social Sciences. 8 (4): 18. ISSN 2229-5313.
- Akas, Chielotam (6 September 2020). "Nudity versus Morality in "Women of Hope" Dance Performance". Research Review of the Institute of African Studies. 17: 134–140.
- Arnold, David (1 March 2000). ""Illusory Riches": Representations of the Tropical World, 1840-1950". Singapore Journal of Tropical Geography. 21 (1): 6–18. Bibcode:2000SJTG...21....6A. doi:10.1111/1467-9493.00060. ISSN 0129-7619.
- Barcan, Ruth (2004). Nudity: A Cultural Anatomy. Berg Publishers. ISBN 1859738729.
- Basden, George T. (1921). Among the Ibos of Nigeria. Philadelphia: J.B. Lippincott.
- Bastian, Misty L (2005). "The Naked and the Nude: Historically Multiple Meanings of Oto (Undress) in Southeastern Nigeria". In Masquelier, Adeline (ed.). Dirt, Undress, and Difference: Critical Perspectives on the Body's Surface. Bloomington: Indiana University Press. pp. 34–60. ISBN 978-0-253-21783-7.
- Batten, Alicia J. (2010). "Clothing and Adornment". Biblical Theology Bulletin. 40 (3): 148–59. doi:10.1177/0146107910375547. S2CID 171056202.
- Beaglehole, Pearl (1939). "Brief Pukapukan Case History". The Journal of the Polynesian Society. 48 (3): 135–143. JSTOR 20702767.
- Bentley, Jerry H. (1993). Old World Encounters: Cross-Cultural Contacts and Exchanges in Pre-Modern Times. New York: Oxford University Press. ISBN 978-0-19-507639-4.
- Berner, Christoph; Schäfer, Manuel; Schott, Martin; Schulz, Sarah; Weingärtner, Martina (27 June 2019). Clothing and Nudity in the Hebrew Bible. Bloomsbury Publishing. ISBN 978-0-567-67848-5.
- Boddy, Janice (20 December 2005). "Purity and Conquest in the Anglo-Egyptian Sudan". In Masquelier, Adeline (ed.). Dirt, Undress, and Difference: Critical Perspectives on the Body's Surface. Indiana University Press. pp. 168–189. ISBN 978-0-253-11153-1.
- Brock, Peggy (2007). "Nakedness and Clothing in Early Encounters Between Aboriginal People of Central Australia, Missionaries and Anthropologists". Journal of Colonialism and Colonial History. 8 (1). doi:10.1353/cch.2007.0015. ISSN 1532-5768. S2CID 162752259.
- Buck, Sir Peter (Te Rangi Hīroa) (1950). The Coming of the Maori (2nd ed.). Wellington: Māori Purposes Fund Board. pp. 176, 364–365.
- Cammaert, Jessica (2016). Undesirable Practices: Women, Children, and the Politics of the Body in Northern Ghana, 1930-1972. Expanding frontiers. Lincoln: University of Nebraska Press. ISBN 978-0-8032-8694-8.
- Cohen, I. Bernard (1992). "What Columbus "Saw" in 1492". Scientific American. 267 (6): 100–106. Bibcode:1992SciAm.267f.100C. doi:10.1038/scientificamerican1292-100. ISSN 0036-8733.
- Clark, Kenneth (1956). The Nude: A Study in Ideal Form. Princeton University Press. ISBN 0-691-01788-3 – via Internet Archive.
- Crooke, W. (1919). "Nudity in India in Custom and Ritual". The Journal of the Royal Anthropological Institute of Great Britain and Ireland. 49: 237–251. doi:10.2307/2843441. ISSN 0307-3114. JSTOR 2843441.
- D'Emilio, John; Freedman, Estelle B. (2012). Intimate Matters: A History of Sexuality in America (Third ed.). Chicago: The University of Chicago Press. ISBN 978-0-226-92380-2.
- Falk, Dan (24 February 2021). "How Darwin's 'Descent of Man' Holds Up 150 Years After Publication". Smithsonian Magazine.
- Fallon, Kathleen M.; Moreau, Julie (1 September 2016). "Revisiting Repertoire Transition: Women's Nakedness as Potent Protests in Nigeria and Kenya". Mobilization: An International Quarterly. 21 (3): 323–340. doi:10.17813/1086-671X-20-3-323. ISSN 1086-671X.
- Gilligan, Ian (13 December 2018). Climate, Clothing, and Agriculture in Prehistory: Linking Evidence, Causes, and Effects. Cambridge University Press. doi:10.1017/9781108555883. ISBN 978-1-108-47008-7. S2CID 238146999.
- Grillo, Laura S. (2019). An Intimate Rebuke: Female Genital Power in Ritual and Politics in West Africa. Durham: Duke University Press. ISBN 978-1-4780-0263-5.
- Han, Hee-sook (2004). "Women's Life During the Choson Dynasty". International Journal of Korean History. 6 (1): 112–160.
- Hansen, Karen Tranberg (2004). "The World in Dress: Anthropological Perspectives on Clothing, Fashion, and Culture". Annual Review of Anthropology. 33 (1): 369–392. doi:10.1146/annurev.anthro.33.070203.143805. ISSN 0084-6570. ProQuest 199841144.
- Herrera Sobek, María (2010). "The Naked and the Differently Clothed: Spanish Encounters with Native Americans in 18th Century Explorations of the Pacific Northwest and Southwest". Camino Real. ISSN 1889-5611.
- Heuler, Hilary (19 February 2014). "New Law Bans Miniskirts in Uganda". VOA.
- Hollander, Anne (1978). Seeing Through Clothes. New York: Viking Press. ISBN 0140110844.
- Hutnyk, John (1 July 1990). "Comparative Anthropology and Evans-Pritchard's Nuer Photography". Critique of Anthropology. 10 (1): 81–102. doi:10.1177/0308275X9001000105. ISSN 0308-275X. S2CID 145594464.
- James, Michael; Burgos, Adam (2022). "Race". In Edward N. Zalta (ed.). The Stanford Encyclopedia of Philosophy (Spring 2022 ed.). Metaphysics Research Lab, Stanford University.
- Jolly, Margaret; Macintyre, Martha (24 November 1989). Family and Gender in the Pacific: Domestic Contradictions and the Colonial Impact. Cambridge University Press. ISBN 978-0-521-34667-2.
- Kawano, Satsuki (2005). "Japanese Bodies and Western Ways of Seeing in the Late Nineteenth Century". In Masquelier, Adeline (ed.). Dirt, Undress, and Difference: Critical Perspectives on the Body's Surface. Bloomington: Indiana University Press. ISBN 978-0-253-21783-7.
- Kirsch, Stuart (1997). "Lost Tribes: Indigenous People and the Social Imaginary". Anthropological Quarterly. 70 (2): 58–67. doi:10.2307/3317506. ISSN 0003-5491. JSTOR 3317506.
- Kohn, Margaret; Reddy, Kavita (2023). "Colonialism". In Edward N. Zalta; Uri Nodelman (eds.). The Stanford Encyclopedia of Philosophy (Spring 2023 ed.). Metaphysics Research Lab, Stanford University.
- Lecuyer, Marie (2021). "The Foamy Politics of Surfing in Hawaii". Ephemera. 21 (1): 305–311. ISSN 2052-1499. ProQuest 2537722437.
- Levine, Philippa (2008). "States of Undress: Nakedness and the Colonial Imagination". Victorian Studies. 50 (2): 189–219. doi:10.2979/VIC.2008.50.2.189. ISSN 0042-5222. JSTOR 40060320. PMID 19069002. S2CID 43750425.
- Levine, Philippa (2013). "Naked Truths: Bodies, Knowledge, and the Erotics of Colonial Power". Journal of British Studies. 52 (1): 5–25. doi:10.1017/jbr.2012.6. ISSN 0021-9371. JSTOR 41999179.
- Levine, Philippa (1 March 2017). "Naked Natives and Noble Savages: The Cultural Work of Nakedness in Imperial Britain". In Crosbie, Barry; Hampton, Mark (eds.). The Cultural Construction of the British World. Manchester University Press. ISBN 978-1-78499-691-8.
- McGrath, Ann (1 January 2015). Naked shame: nation, science and Indigenous knowledge in Walter Roth's interventions into frontier sexualities. Australia, Australia/Oceania: Left Coast Press Inc. ISBN 978-1-59874-228-2.
- Masquelier, Adeline Marie (2005). "An Introduction". In Masquelier, Adeline Marie (ed.). Dirt, Undress, and Difference Critical Perspectives on the Body's Surface. Bloomington: Indiana University Press. pp. 1–33. ISBN 0253111536.
- Mead, S. M. (1969). Traditional Maori Clothing. Wellington: A. H. & A. W. Reed. pp. 85–87, 143.
- Messenger, John C.; Messenger, Betty T. (1981). "Sexuality in Folklore in a Nigerian Society". Central Issues in Anthropology. 3 (1): 29–50. doi:10.1525/cia.1981.3.1.29. ISSN 1937-6227.
- Mũkũyũ (21 November 2014). "The Politics of African "Moral" Dress". Gīkūyū Centre for Cultural Studies.
- Naidu, Maheshvari (2009). "'Topless' Tradition for Tourists: Young Zulu Girls in Tourism". Agenda. 23 (79): 38–48.
- Olesen, Jan (2009). ""Mercyfull Warres agaynst These Naked People": The Discourse of Violence in the Early Americas". Canadian Review of American Studies. 39 (3): 253–272. doi:10.3138/cras.39.3.253. ISSN 0007-7720.
- Ritchie, Jenny; Skerrett, Mere (2014). Early Childhood Education in Aotearoa New Zealand: History, Pedagogy, and Liberation. Palgrave Macmillan. ISBN 978-1-349-48394-5.
- Salazar, Noel B.; Graburn, Nelson H. H. (1 June 2014). Tourism Imaginaries: Anthropological Approaches. Berghahn Books. ISBN 978-1-78238-368-0.
- Salmond, Anne (1991). Two worlds: first meetings between Maori and Europeans, 1642–1772. Auckland: Viking. pp. 275–276.
- Salmond, Anne (2017). Tears of Rangi: Experiments Across Worlds. Auckland University Press. p. 526. ISBN 978-1-77558-923-5.
- Sarpong, Awo Abena Amoa; Sarpong, Henrietta Emma; Botchway, De-Valera N. Y. M. (2014). ""Bo Me Truo": A Female-Centred Sun Fire Nudity Dance Ritual of Fertility of the Sehwi People of Ghana" (PDF). Chronica Mundi. 9 (1): 93–128.
- Sayer, Karen (2002). "'A Sufficiency of Clothing': Dress and Domesticity in Victorian Britain". Textile History. 33 (1): 112–122. doi:10.1179/004049602793710099. ISSN 1743-2952. PMID 20707020. S2CID 45214026.
- Schlebusch; et al. (3 November 2017). "Southern African ancient genomes estimate modern human divergence to 350,000 to 260,000 years ago". Science. 358 (6363): 652–655. Bibcode:2017Sci...358..652S. doi:10.1126/science.aao6266. PMID 28971970. S2CID 206663925.
- Sheriff, Abdul H. (1974). "The Dynamics of Change in Pre-Colonial East African Societies". African Economic History Review. 1 (2): 7–14. doi:10.2307/3601096. ISSN 0360-6333. JSTOR 3601096.
- Sheth, Falguni A. (10 March 2022). "The Hijab and the Sari: The Strange and the Sexy Between Colonialism and Global Capitalism". Unruly Women: Race, Neocolonialism, and the Hijab. Oxford University Press. p. 0. doi:10.1093/oso/9780197547137.003.0005. ISBN 978-0-19-754713-7.
- Sooriyagoda, L (28 July 2025). "Public decency laws outlaw nudity in Sri Lanka". Daily Mirror.
- Stevens, Scott Manning (2003). "New World Contacts and the Trope of the 'Naked Savage". In Elizabeth D. Harvey (ed.). Sensible Flesh: On Touch in Early Modern Culture. University of Pennsylvania Press. pp. 124–140. ISBN 9780812293630.
- Stauss, Alexandra von (1 January 2012). "Intercultural Encounters: The Kalahari and The Zulu". Cultural Tourism and Identity: 85–98. doi:10.1163/9789004234581_007. ISBN 9789004234185.
- Tallie, T. J. (2016). "Sartorial Settlement: The Mission Field and Transformation in Colonial Natal, 1850-1897". Journal of World History. 27 (3): 389–410. doi:10.1353/jwh.2016.0114. ISSN 1045-6007. S2CID 151700116.
- Tcherkézoff, Serge (2008). First Contacts in Polynesia. The Samoan Case (1722–1848) Western Misunderstandings about Sexuality and Divinity. ANU Press. ISBN 978-1-921536-01-4.
- Toups, M. A.; Kitchen, A.; Light, J. E.; Reed, D. L. (2010). "Origin of Clothing Lice Indicates Early Clothing Use by Anatomically Modern Humans in Africa". Molecular Biology and Evolution. 28 (1): 29–32. doi:10.1093/molbev/msq234. ISSN 0737-4038. PMC 3002236. PMID 20823373.
- Vaughan, Alden T. (1 October 1982). "From White Man to Redskin: Changing Anglo-American Perceptions of the American Indian". The American Historical Review. 87 (4): 918. doi:10.2307/1857900. ISSN 0002-8762. JSTOR 1857900.
- Viestad, Vibeke Maria (4 March 2019). "Debunking the colonial myth of the "naked Bushman"". The Conversation.
- Wallace, Scott (18 October 2011). The Unconquered: In Search of the Amazon's Last Uncontacted Tribes. Crown. ISBN 978-0-307-46298-5.
- Walsh, Casey (9 March 2018). "Virtuous Waters: Mineral Springs, Bathing, and Infrastructure in Mexico". Bathing and Domination in the Early Modern Atlantic World. University of California Press. pp. 15–33. doi:10.1525/9780520965393-004. ISBN 978-0-520-96539-3. S2CID 243754145.
- Wamsley, Laurel (12 March 2018). "'National Geographic' Reckons With Its Past: 'For Decades, Our Coverage Was Racist'". The Two-Way.
- Watson, Irene (1998). "Naked Peoples: Rules and Regulations". Law Text Culture. 4: 1–17.
- Watson, Irene (2014). "Naked: The coming of the cloth". Aboriginal Peoples, Colonialism and International Law. Routledge.
- Watson, Irene (29 October 2014). Aboriginal Peoples, Colonialism and International Law: Raw Law. London: Routledge. ISBN 978-1-315-85899-9.
- Wiener, Margaret (2005). "Breasts. (Un)Dress, and Modernist Desires in Balinese-Tourist Encounter". In Masquelier, Adeline (ed.). Dirt, Undress, and Difference: Critical Perspectives on the Body's Surface. Indiana University Press. ISBN 978-0-253-21783-7.
- Woolf, Leonard (1963). Diaries in Ceylon, 1908–1911, and Stories from the East: Records of a Colonial Administrator. London: Hogarth Press.
- Zamora, Margarita (1990). "Abreast of Columbus: Gender and Discovery". Cultural Critique (17): 127–149. doi:10.2307/1354142. ISSN 0882-4371. JSTOR 1354142.
- "South African Festival: Inside Story Of The Controversial Zulu Half Naked Dance Festival In Southern Africa". Africa News | NationalTurk. 26 August 2013.
- "2024 Umhlanga Reed Dance dates officially announced! | The Kingdom of Eswatini (Swaziland)". The Kingdom of Eswatini. 16 August 2024.
- "What to wear in Kampala - Entebbe - Uganda". Kabiza Wilderness Safaris. 29 May 2022.
- "Women in Yap dance at Easter for the 'Light that lights up the world'". Catholics & Cultures. 19 April 2019.
