= Africa Squeaks =

1940 film by Robert Clampett

- Title card
- Directed by: Robert Clampett
- Produced by: Leon Schlesinger
- Starring: Mel Blanc; Ben Frommer; Lou Marcelle; Kay Kyser; Bill Days (all uncredited)
- Music by: Carl W. Stalling
- Animation by: John Carey; Dave Hoffman
- Color process: Black-and-white
- Production company: Leon Schlesinger Productions
- Distributed by: Warner Bros. Pictures
- Release date: January 27, 1940
- Running time: 7 min
- Country: United States
- Language: English

Africa Squeaks is a 1940 American animated comedy short film directed by Robert Clampett. The short was released on January 27, 1940. It is part of the Looney Tunes series and the 70th cartoon to feature Porky Pig. The cartoon is a parody of the movie Stanley and Livingstone starring Spencer Tracy and Cedric Hardwicke. The title is a parody of the 1930 documentary Africa Speaks!

== Plot ==
Porky Pig hunts at Darkest Africa, walking into the Africa Lions Club while Africans carry his belongings. Porky meets Henry Morton Stanley from Stanley and Livingstone, a caricature of his actor Spencer Tracy, who confuses him with Dr. Livingstone. He spends the remainder of the film finding Dr. Livingstone while being abused by animals.

The narrator introduces an ostrich sleeping with a pillow underground, two lions who share a wishbone, a monkey swinging across trees with her tail while holding a stroller with her baby inside, and a gorilla caricature of Tony Galento with a beer. A native uses blow darts to win a ham from a carnival game. At night, Porky is disturbed by the prowls of nearby wildlife and orders them to be quiet.

As Porky and the natives continue their march into a village named Los Angeles, a cat kicks an elephant out of a boarding house but keeps his trunk until he can pay rent to his chagrin. A vulture tries to hunt young deer, who retaliate by killing it with a machine gun. A native alerts Porky of another white man in the vicinity. Porky drags Stanley to meet him, only to find the white man to be Cake-Icer, a caricature of Kay Kyser, who encourages the natives and animals to sing. The next day, Porky and the Africans leave the village. The narrator bids Africa goodbye, which the continent literally responds joyfully.

== Cast ==
- Mel Blanc as Porky Pig, Africans, Lion, Cat, Elephant, Africa, Galento Gorilla, Deer, Carnival African, Kangaroo
- Ben Frommer as Stanley
- Lou Marcelle as the Narrator
- Kay Kyser as Cake-Icer (Guest Appearance)
- Bill Days as Gorilla Singer
- The Sportsmen Quartet as the Singing Natives

== Reception ==
The cartoon was reviewed by Boxoffice on February 3, 1940, saying: "Play this one by all means. It is composed of the stuff that shakes the rafters and fairly blows the roof off when the laughter starts to whip around. Porky goes to Africa on a safari. What occurs when he does a little exploring was cooked up by the fertile brain that injected the right touches of unusual caricature and bang-up comedy to give 'em the shrieks. And there is an ending that will knock 'em right out of their seats."

Motion Picture Exhibitor agreed, on February 7: "One of the best of the Leon Schlesinger series... The belly laughs are many, and the gags good."

On February 20, Motion Picture Herald said: "This time porcine Porky is a leader of a safari into the darkest regions of the Black Continent. Particularly productive of funny bone tickling in the spoofing of the Stanley search for Dr. Livingstone. There are additional sights of the strange behavior of animals and natives. In fact, the whole fun and frivolity piece is good."

== Home media ==
- DVD: Porky Pig 101 (B&W, uncut)

== See also ==
- Porky Pig filmography
- Looney Tunes and Merrie Melodies filmography (1940–1949)
