= Goona-goona epic =

Exploitation film genre

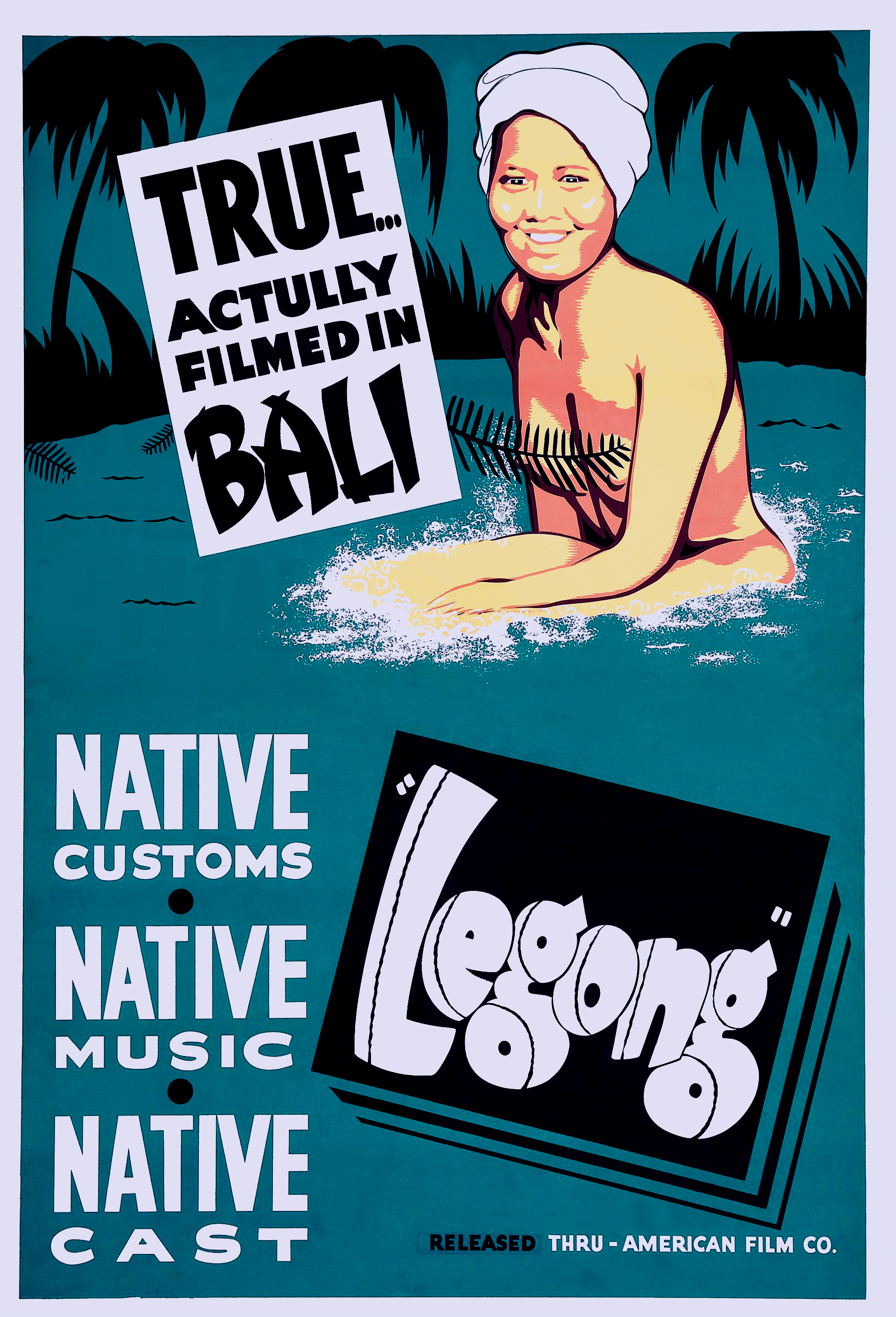
Poster for Legong: Dance of the Virgins (1935)

The goona-goona epic is a particular type of native-culture exploitation film set in remote parts of the Far East, Southeast Asia, Africa, South America, and the South Pacific.

== Background ==
In Hollywood trade magazines "goona-goona" was a descriptive term for films or photos showing women of color with bare breasts, usually in a supposed spirit of ethnographic interest. The use of the term as a film genre derives from the 1932 film Goona-Goona, An Authentic Melodrama of the Island of Bali by Andre Roosevelt and Armand Denis. The term originates from guna-guna, an Indonesian word for witchcraft.

== Characteristics ==
The genre made use of orientalist and exoticist themes. Examples included documentaries (often of questionable authenticity) and dramas, both of which rely heavily on travelogue and stock footage scenes (and sometimes fabricated scenes) of semi-nude native peoples performing exotic rituals and customs.

== Popularity and decline ==
The semi-pornographic nature of the genre provided scandal for the conservative American general audiences of the 1920s and 1930s, which made it popular.

Additionally, the genre grew during a time when Southeast Asia, particularly Bali, had become a popular destination among the Western public due to its perception as an "Eastern Paradise" compared to war-torn Western Europe. As western audiences began consuming more pornography, and as many colonized nations sought independence in the post-war era, the genre became obsolete.

== See also ==
- Mondo film
- Nudity in film
- Stereotypes of South Asians
