= Ke-Go =

- Type: Smart bombs
- Place of origin: Japan

Service history
- In service: 1945
- Used by: Imperial Japanese Navy
- Wars: World War II

Production history
- Manufacturer: Yokosuka Naval Air Technical Arsenal

Specifications
- Mass: 800 kg (1,764 lb)
- Length: 5.49 m (18 ft)
- Width: 2.85 m (9 ft 4 in)
- Guidance system: Infrared homing

Ke-Go was one of the first guided weapons, developed by the Imperial Japanese Army Ordnance Board. The Ke-Go was a free falling, infra-red guided, gyro-stabilized missile, intended to be dropped from airplanes onto shipping targets. The missile had eight wings in two cross-configurations, one set fore and one set aft. Output from the heat-seeking head was amplified to provide guidance control to flaps on the four forward wings. The main body was to hold an explosive charge behind the heat-seeking head.

== Development ==
Tokyo Shibaura Denki Company began development of infrared seekers around March 1944, and Hideo Itokawa of the Nakajima Aircraft Company was tasked with the aerodynamic design of the missile.

On September 5, 1944, a Land and Sea Technology Operation Committee was established to integrate science and technology for military purposes, and the Ke-Go project was included in one of the studies. The Army planned to produce 700 missiles by October 1945. The Navy's Yokosuka P1Y "Frances" bomber was intended to be the launch aircraft.

In addition to Toshiba, engineers from electronic components companies also participated in the development study group, and Akio Morita, who was a naval technology lieutenant, and Masaru Ibuka, who was a measurement instrumentation engineer, became acquainted at the study group and established Tokyo Telecom Industry Co., Ltd., the predecessor of Sony, after the war.

== Testing ==
In January 1945, the first drop test was carried out at Lake Hamana. The bombs were dropped on a 10 × 30 meters target (a fire burning on a raft). The results were not satisfactory. Despite the fact that the homing head worked quite satisfactorily, the control device did not work well. Only 5 or 6 out of 50 bombs dropped hit the target.

Based on these results, the fleet created two new models with improved guidance, but by the time the bombs were ready for testing, the war ended without the missiles entering mass production.

== See also ==
- List of anti-ship missiles
- List of World War II guided missiles of Germany

=== Weapons of comparable role, performance and era ===
- Bomb MK 57 Bat (U.S. Navy radar-guided glide bomb)
- PC 1400 X (Fritz X)
- LBD Gargoyle
- GB-4
- GB-6
- Mitsubishi Ki-147 (I-Gо̄ Model 1 Kо̄)
- Kawasaki Ki-148 (I-Gо̄ Model 1 Otsu)
- Nikitin PSN-1
- Nikitin PSN-2
- SNAB-3000
- UB-2000F
- UB-5000F
- VB-6 Felix

=== Other related articles of the same era ===
- Funryu
- Kehl-Strasbourg radio control link, for MCLOS control of WW II German PGM ordnance
- Kramer X4- Max Kramer's air-to-air guided missile
- Ohka
- Project Pigeon
