= VB-6 Felix =

American infrared homing guided bomb

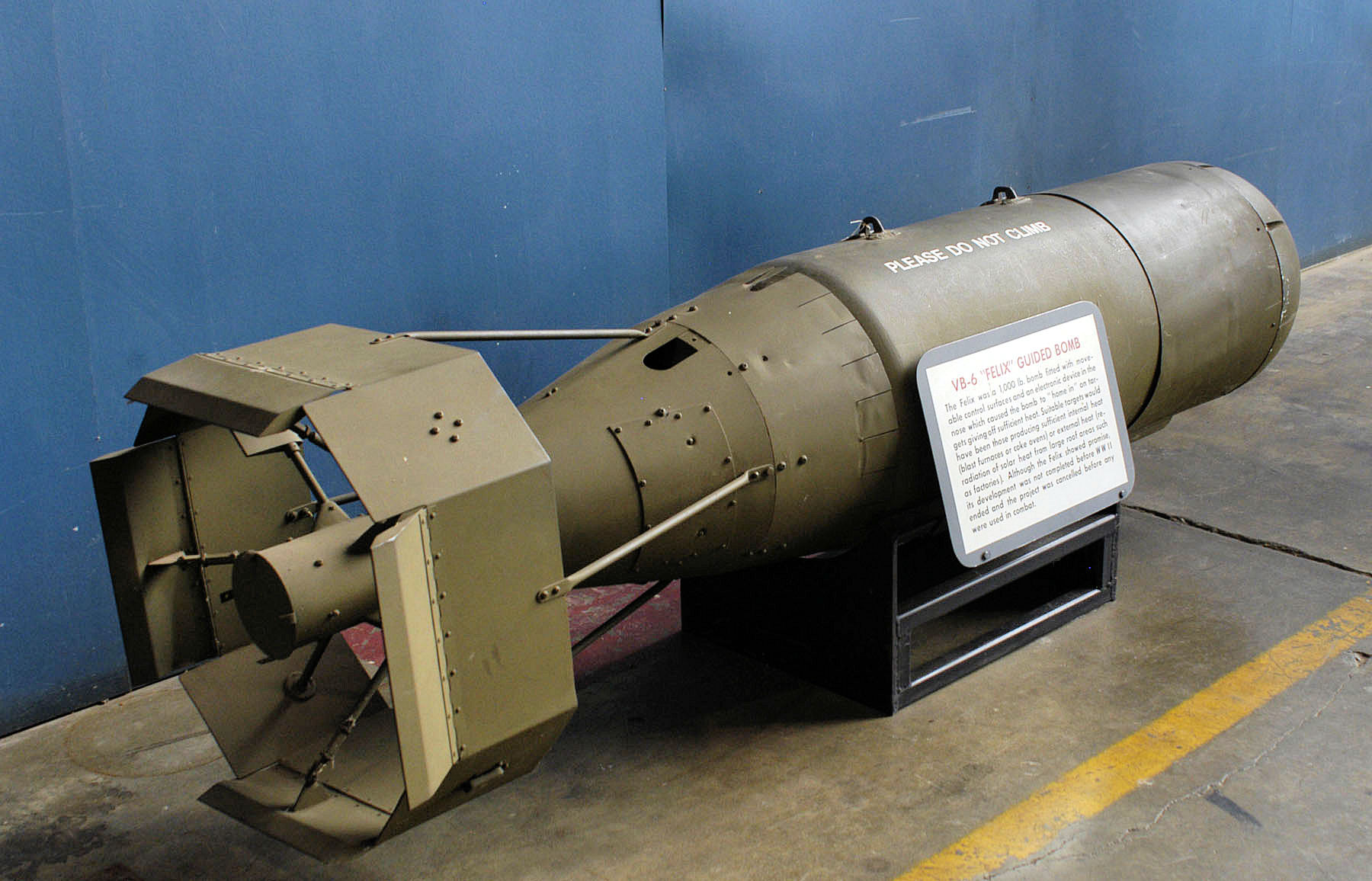
- VB-6 Felix at the National Museum of the USAF
- Type: anti-ship missile / guided bomb
- Place of origin: United States

Service history
- In service: never used operationally
- Wars: World War II

Production history
- Designer: National Defense Research Committee
- Produced: 1945

Specifications
- Mass: 1202 lb (545 kg)
- Length: 91.2 in (231.6 cm)
- Diameter: 18.6 in (47.2 cm)
- Warhead: amatol explosive
- Warhead weight: 1000 pounds (454 kg)
- Engine: none
- Guidance system: Infrared homing

The VB-6 Felix was a precision-guided munition developed by the United States during World War II. It used an infrared seeker to attack targets like blast furnaces or the metal roofs of large factories. The war ended before it could be used operationally.

== History ==
Created by the National Defense Research Committee, Felix relied on infrared to detect and home on heat-emitting targets in clear weather; blast furnaces were considered a particularly practical target for such a weapon, as were the reflective metal roofs of factory buildings. It was this property which earned the weapon its name, after the ability of cats to see in the dark; Felix the Cat was an extremely popular cartoon character at the time.

Felix was a 1000-pound (454 kg) general purpose (GP) bomb with an infrared seeker in the nose and octagonal guidance fins in the tail. Unlike other weapons, such as the German Fritz X, Felix was autonomous once launched, although there was a flare in the tail for tracking. In tests, Felix demonstrated a circular error probable of 85 feet (26 m).

Successful trials led to Felix being put in production in 1945, but the Pacific War ended before it entered combat.

== Dove ==
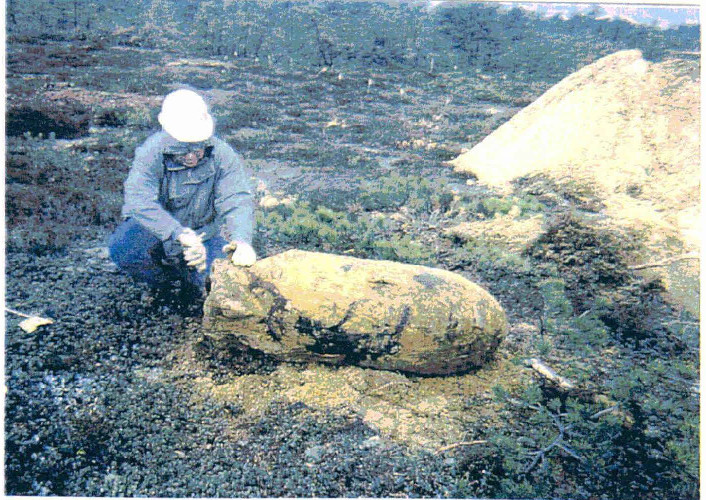
Remnant of a Dove bomb excavated at the former Camp Wellfleet in the late 1990s, where a bombing practice target was located in the 1940s.

A naval version of the Felix, the ASM-N-4 Dove, was approved in 1944; in 1946 the project was transferred to Eastman Kodak, and in 1949 a contract for 20 prototype weapons was issued. Dove's infrared seeker was expected to be capable of correcting 400-metre (1,300 ft) aiming errors; trials took place through 1952, but no production was undertaken.

== See also ==
- List of anti-ship missiles

=== Weapons of comparable role, performance and era ===
- Bomb MK 57 Bat (U.S. Navy radar-guided glide bomb)
- PC 1400 X (Fritz X)
- LBD Gargoyle
- Azon
- GB-4
- GB-6
- Bat
- Mitsubishi Ki-147 (I-Gо̄ Model 1 Kо̄)
- Kawasaki Ki-148 (I-Gо̄ Model 1 Otsu)
- Ke-Go
- Nikitin PSN-1
- Nikitin PSN-2
- SNAB-3000
- UB-2000F "Chaika-2"
