= Pelican (bomb) =

WW2 era American guided bomb

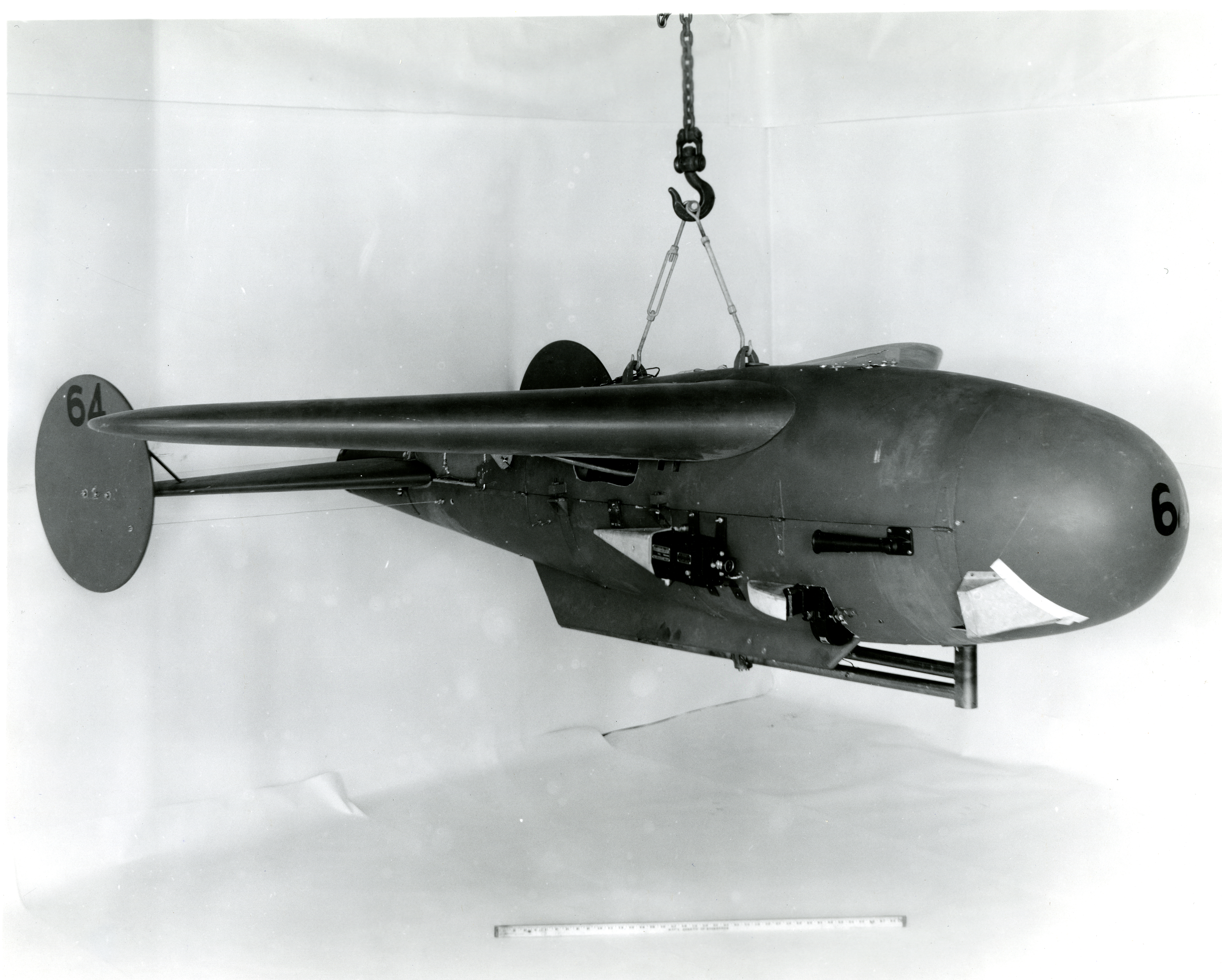
- Type: Guided bomb
- Place of origin: United States

Service history
- In service: 1944
- Used by: United States Navy
- Wars: World War II (testing only)

Production history
- Designed: National Defense Research Committee
- Manufacturer: Bureau of Ordnance

Specifications
- Warhead weight: 1,000-pound (450 kg) or 1,500-pound (680 kg) bomb
- Guidance system: Semi-active radar homing

The Pelican, also known as Bomb Mark 55 and, in one version, SWOD Mark 7, was a guided bomb developed by the United States Navy during World War II. Guided by semi-active radar homing, Pelican was produced in 1,000 lb (450 kg) and 1,500 lb (680 kg) sizes; the program reached the stage of live trials before being cancelled.

== Design and development ==
The project that led to the development of Pelican was initiated by the National Defense Research Committee in 1942. Two main guided-bomb programs were established for use by the U.S. Navy's Bureau of Ordnance; one led to the active radar-guided Bat, which saw operational service near the end of the war, while the other was for a bomb controlled by a semi-active radar seeker, which was designated Bomb Mark 55 and named Pelican.

Two versions of Pelican were developed; one used a 1,000-pound (450 kg) bomb as its basis, named Pelican Mark II, while the other used a 1,500-pound (680 kg) bomb and was referred to as Pelican Mark III. Both had a high-mounted wing, with a twin-fin empennage providing stabilization and control. The semi-active radar seeker head was designed for use with the AN/APS-2 radar carried in the Lockheed PV-1 Ventura; the PV-1 could carry two Pelican Mark IIs or a single Pelican Mark III. While Pelican required its launching aircraft to continue illuminating its target with its onboard radar following launch, compared to the Bat which carried its own radar set, Pelican could be released at a greater range.

The Pelican Mark III received the designation SWOD (Special Weapons Ordnance Device) Mark 7 late in its development.

== Operational history ==
Initial tests of Pelican were conducted in December 1942, and trials continued through 1943; these established that the radar-homing Pelican was significantly more accurate than bombs using television guidance. However the weight of the Pelican meant that the range of the PV-1 was inadequate for service in the Pacific Theatre, and the number of Venturas that could be converted was limited by operational needs; as a result, despite successful tests, including one on 9 September 1944 that saw two of four Pelicans launched hit the target hulk SS James Longstreet, the program was cancelled on 18 September 1944 by Admiral Ernest King. The resources devoted to the project were redirected to accelerated development of its successor, the U.S. Navy-deployed Bat.

== See also ==
- Azon – (United States)
- Dove – (United States)
- Fritz X – (Nazi Germany)
- Gargoyle – (United States)
- GB-8 – (United States)
- Henschel Hs 293 – (Nazi Germany)

Related lists

- List of anti-ship missiles
