= ASM-N-2 Bat =

U.S. World War II glide bomb

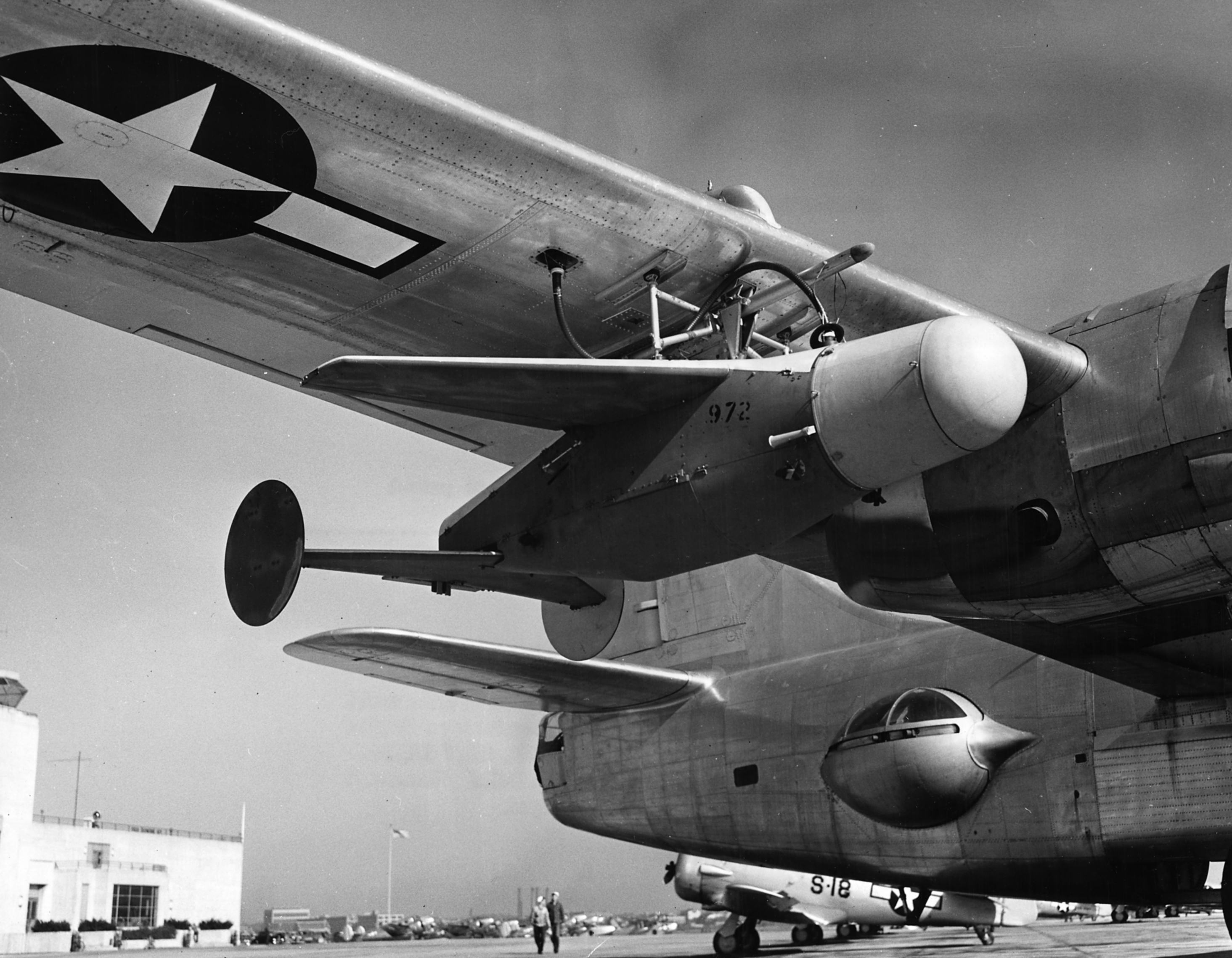
- Bat guided bomb mated to PB4Y Privateer
- Type: Conventional
- Place of origin: United States

Service history
- In service: 1945 (Bomb MK 57) – 1953 (ASM-N-2)
- Used by: United States Navy
- Wars: World War II

Production history
- Manufacturer: National Bureau of Standards
- No. built: 2,580

Specifications
- Mass: Airframe and guidance package only – 600 pounds (270 kg)
- Length: 11 feet 11 inches (3.63 m)
- Width: 10 feet (3.0 m)
- Filling weight: 1,000 lb bomb (1,600 lb (727 kg) gross)

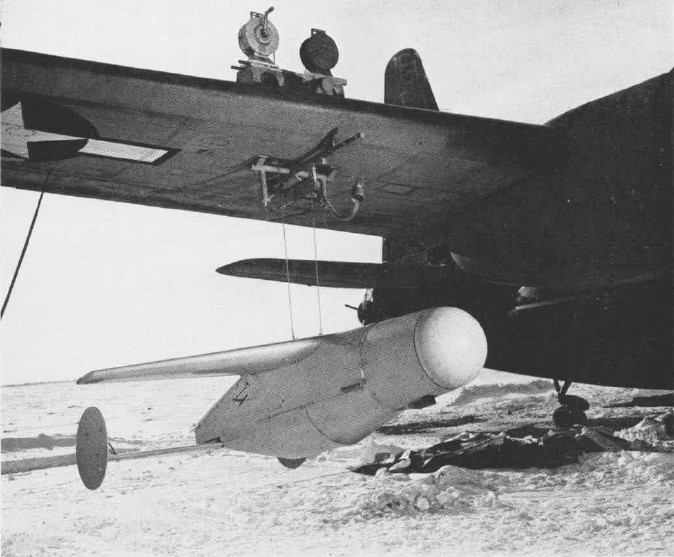
A Bat on its hoist

The ASM-N-2 Bat, originally designated as the Bomb MK 57 and later as the SWOD Mk 9, was a United States Navy World War II radar-guided glide bomb which was used in combat beginning in April 1945. The Bat was developed and manufactured by a unit within the National Bureau of Standards (later a part of the Army Research Laboratory), with assistance from the U.S. Navy's Bureau of Ordnance, the Massachusetts Institute of Technology, and Bell Telephone Laboratories. It is considered to be the first fully automated guided missile used in combat.

== Background ==
In January 1941, RCA proposed a new TV-guided anti-ship weapon called the Dragon, where the operator would use the TV image sent from the nose of the weapon and maneuver it during the weapon's fall. The National Bureau of Standards (NBS) would provide the ordinance airframe for the weapon idea, which was the same airframe design used for the cancelled pigeon-guided Project Pigeon and semi-active radar-guided Pelican programs.

By mid-1943, a modification of the Pelican’s design was proposed, which would replace the cancelled program’s semi-active system with a new active radar homing system from Western Electric, and pair it with a AN-M66 2,000-pound (907 kg) (one short ton) general-purpose (GP) bomb, the same ordnance unit as used for the heavier VB-2 version of the Azon guided bomb used by the US Army Air Force. This Pelican version entered testing in mid-1944 at Naval Air Station New York, where it hit its target ship in two out of four drops.

== Development ==
The production version of the project reused the original NBS airframe and paired it with the AN-M65 1,000-pound (454 kg) GP bomb, the same basic ordnance that was used in the original VB-1 Azon bomb and Pelican program. The missile was gyrostabilized with an autopilot system supplied by Bendix Aviation and steerable by a tail elevator that was powered by small wind-driven generators. While the NBS and Bendix developed the Bat's aerodynamic and gyroscopic stabilizing systems, MIT and Bell Labs worked together on its guidance mechanism. The Navy's Bureau of Ordnance, in partnership with MIT, supervised the missile’s development, with the NBS in charge of the overall development.

Flight tests were conducted at the Naval Air Ordnance Test Station at Chincoteague Island, Virginia, and "was flight tested by a small unit based at Philadelphia against targets in New Jersey" at the future Warren Grove Range . NBS Aerodynamics Division director Hugh Latimer Dryden would go on to win the President's Certificate of Merit for the development of the Bat.

== Deployment ==
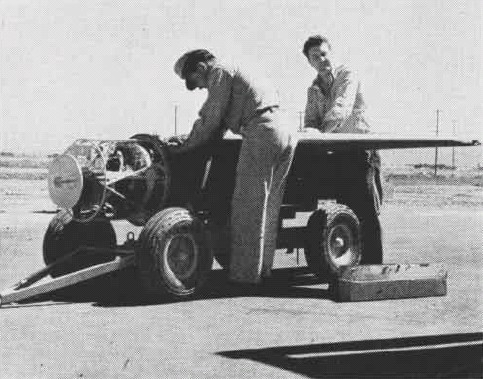
A Bat weapon on a bomb cart, with its nose radome removed

The missile was introduced into combat service in January of 1945. The anti-ship variant of the missile, the SWOD (“Special Weapons Ordnance Device") Mk.9 Mod 0 was introduced into combat service in April 1945.

On May 27, 1945, Consolidated PB4Y Privateers flying off the coast of Borneo with one bomb mounted under each wing dropped SWODs at altitudes of 15,000 to 25,000 feet (4,600 to 7,600 metres) and airspeeds of 140 to 210 kn (260 to 390 km/h), sinking several Japanese ships and damaging the kaibokan Aguni from a range of 20 nmi (37 km); this vessel is frequently misreported as having been sunk by a destroyer. Several Bats were later fitted with modified radar systems (SWOD Mk 9 Mod 1) and dropped on Japanese-held bridges and other land-based targets in Burma. The Bat's radar guidance system frequently got confused by radar land clutter, particularly against targets close to shore. A total of approximately 2,600 Bat missiles were deployed throughout World War II.

After the end of the war, the naval designation ASM-N-2 was applied to the unit.

The PB4Y Privateer was the primary launch platform for the Bat throughout World War II, but other aircraft were also modified to launch the weapon, including the Vought F4U Corsair, Curtiss SB2C Helldiver, and Grumman TBF Avenger. The primary post-war aircraft to carry the weapon was the Lockheed P2V Neptune, until the Bat was retired from service in 1953.

== Missiles on display ==
The original NBS test airframe of the Bat was renovated in 2001 to resemble the real missile and is currently on display at the museum of the National Institute of Standards and Technology, the successor to the earlier US National Bureau of Standards. Another example is on display at the Pima Air & Space Museum in Tucson, Arizona.

== See also ==
- Fritz X
- Henschel Hs 293
- Ruhrstahl X-4
- Azon
- VB-6 Felix
- McDonnell LBD-1 Gargoyle
- Project Pigeon
- GB-8
- Kawasaki Ki-147 I-Go Type1 - Ko
- Kawasaki Ki-148
- Ke-Go

Related lists

- List of anti-ship missiles
