= List of Russian/USSR gliders =

This is a list of gliders and sailplanes from the USSR and Russia.

== Russian/USSR miscellaneous constructors ==
- Anoschenko ND Macaque
- Anotchenko Makaka – N.D. Anotchenko
- Aviatrust Moskau
- Aviatrust Rote Presnia
- Berkout
- Borchn-Anemon BA-1 Tandem – Борчн- Анмонов БА-1
- Charkov ChAI-3 Харьков ХАИ-3
- Cochkanoff man-powered aircraft
- Delone 1909 glider – Делоне 1909
- Dobahov Krymosoaviahim
- Dobrovolski 1911 – S. P. Dobrovloski
- Domrachev Leningrad – Домрачева Ленинград – Y. V. Domrachev
- DOSAAF Aktivista
- Eliferov Aviafak 1 – Елиферов Авиафак 1
- Gremyatsky Diskoplan – Anatoli Grematsky
- Groshev G-2 – G. Groshev
- Groshev GN-7
- Ilyushin Il-32 – OKB Ilyushin
- Ilyushin Mastyazhart – S.V. Ilyushin
- Kalinin K-11 – proof of concept glider for K-12/BS-2 / K-13 tailless airliner / bomber.
- Klementyev APS-11 P. Klementyev
- Kostenko-Rauschenbusch LAK-1 – Костенко-Раушенбах ЛАК-1
- Kostenko-Rauschenbusch LAK-2 – Костенко-Раушенбах ЛАК-2
- Kovalenko DR-5
- Lush Swift Vladimir S. Lush
- Lyushin Maori – S. N. Lyushin
- Manotskov Kachouk – A. Manotskov (variable dihedral) – (Маноцкова Кашук)
- Nikitin PSN-1 – Vasilii Vasilyevich Nikitin – Glider bomb
- Nikitin PSN-2 – Vasilii Vasilyevich Nikitin – Glider bomb
- Oskbes Aviatika Mai 920 – Oskbes MAI Moskau Aviation Institut
- Petsuha PAI-6 – (Пьецуха ПАИ-6) – A. I. Petsuha
- Polikarpov BJP – Nikolaj Polikarpov– AMI
- Pychnov Strij – V. S. Pyshnov – AVF – (Aviarabotnik)
- Rostov GT-1 Kaganovich – Rostov Technical Institute
- Sharapov AN Brawler Kudeyar "Desperado"
- Skif (glider)
- Smolenets (glider) – (Смоленец)
- Spartakus 1 – E. Kristovskogo
- Spivak Kolesnikov Vega-1 – D. N. Kolesnikov & Spivak
- Spivak Kolesnikov Vega-2
- Tański Lotnia 2 – TAŃSKI, Czesław Tański
- Tikhonravov AVF-1 Aral – (Тихонравова АВФ-1 Арап) – M. K. Tikhonravov – Aviarabotnik
- Tolstoï Korchoun – . L. & Tolstoï, G. P. & K. Zeyvang – a.k.a. Толстых Коршун (Tolstoï Cerf-volant)
- Tsybin Ts-25
- Tupolev TB-6 glider (ANT-33?)
- Vakhmistrov-Tikhonravov Dragon V. Vakhmistrov & M. Tikhonravov
- Valk IOS – S.F. Valk
- Valk IOS-2
- Vekchine 1910 glider – G. D. Vekchine
- Yeremeyev Stalinets-4 P. Yeremeyev
- Za Mir
