= GB-4 =

American TV-guided bomb

GB-4 (Glide Bomb No.4)
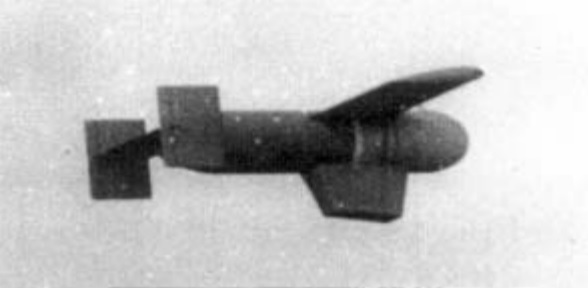
- Type: Guided Bomb
- Place of origin: United States

Service history
- In service: Combat Tested
- Wars: World War II

Production history
- Produced: 1944
- No. built: 1,200

Specifications
- Mass: 2,535 lb (1,150 kg)
- Length: 12.2 ft (3.7 m)
- Diameter: 24 in (61 cm)
- Warhead weight: 2,000 lb (910 kg)
- Detonation mechanism: T62 Impact Fuze
- Engine: none
- Operational range: 17 mi (27 km) Preferred
- Maximum speed: 250–300 mph (400–480 km/h)
- Guidance system: Block III (AN/AXT-2) television equipment and remote radio control

GB-4 (Glide Bomb No.4) was a precision guided munition developed by the United States during World War II. GB-4s used a television guidance system with the weapon being steered by a TV bombardier operating a joystick in the launch aircraft.

The first GB-4s (then known as MX-607s) were tested at Eglin Air Force Base during August 1943. During testing the GB-4's circular error probable accuracy was found to be 200 feet (61 m). The type was ordered into production on 15 January 1944. Although approved for operational use, the typed suffered from reliability problems throughout testing.

The GB-4 was briefly used in combat by the 388th Bomber Group, based in eastern England, but its performance was deemed unsatisfactory. 1,200 GB-4's were delivered to the USAAF however poor combat results lead to a decision to halt further deliveries in February 1945.

== See also ==
- Fritz X
- GB-1
- Azon
- VB-6 Felix
