= SS James Longstreet =

United States Liberty ship

Coordinates: 41°49′53.27″N 70°02′39.28″W

- SS James Longstreet before her last and final voyage

History

United States
- Name: James Longstreet
- Namesake: James Longstreet
- Operator: International Freighting Corporation
- Builder: Todd Houston Shipbuilding Corporation, Houston, Texas
- Cost: $1,833,400
- Yard number: 18
- Laid down: 24 August 1942
- Launched: 31 October 1942
- Out of service: Damaged by grounding in 1943 and written off
- Identification: Code letters KHKT
- Fate: Acquired by the Navy in 1944; Used as a target until 1970; Hulk sunk in 1996

General characteristics
- Class & type: Liberty ship; type EC2-S-C1, standard
- Tonnage: 7,000 tons deadweight
- Length: 441 feet 6 inches (135 m) oa; 416 feet (127 m) pp; 427 feet (130 m) lwl
- Beam: 57 feet (17 m)
- Draft: 27 ft 9.25 in (8.4646 m)
- Propulsion: 1 × triple-expansion steam engine, 1 × screw propeller
- Speed: 11.5 knots (21.3 km/h; 13.2 mph)
- Capacity: 562,608 cubic feet (15,931 m^{3}) (grain); 499,573 cubic feet (14,146 m^{3}) (bale)
- Complement: 38–62 USMM; 21–40 USNAG
- Armament: Varied by ship; Bow-mounted 3-inch (76 mm)/50-caliber gun; Stern-mounted 4-inch (102 mm)/50-caliber gun; 2–8 × single 20-millimeter (0.79 in) Oerlikon anti-aircraft (AA) cannons and/or, 2–8 × 37-millimeter (1.46 in) M1 AA guns

SS James Longstreet (Hull Number 112) was a Liberty ship built in the United States during World War II. Named after the Confederate general James Longstreet, she entered service in 1942, but was wrecked in a storm on 26 October 1943 and was subsequently used as a target hulk by the United States Navy.

== Construction history ==
Named after Confederate general James Longstreet and built at a cost of $1,833,400 USD, James Longstreet was launched in October 1942, in Houston, Texas, by the Houston Shipbuilding Corp.

== Wartime history ==
James Longstreet was operated by the International Freighting Corporation. After loading cargo James Longstreet sailed independently on 27 November 1942 (from Houston, Texas via New Orleans, Yucatán Straits, Panama) to Australia, India, and Ceylon. Her crew learned in Panama on 10 December 1942 that the ship would not be in a convoy and would be making the 11000 mile trek alone to Fremantle, routing 1000 miles off the standard shipping lanes. She returned through the Panama Canal on 14 May 1943. She joined convoy ZG 31 arriving at Guantánamo on 18 May, and leaving the following day with convoy GK 734 to reach Key West on 22 May. After loading a general cargo, she joined convoy HX 245 leaving New York City on 23 June 1943 to reach Liverpool on 7 July. She returned in ballast with convoy ONS 14 leaving Liverpool on 26 July 1943 to reach Halifax, Nova Scotia on 9 August, where she transferred to convoy XB 68 reaching the Cape Cod Canal on 11 August. After loading a general cargo including some explosives, she joined convoy BX 72 leaving Boston on 5 September 1943 to reach Halifax on 7 September, where she joined convoy HX 256 reaching Liverpool on 21 September. She joined convoy WP 405 at Milford Haven on 23 September 1943 to reach Portsmouth on 25 September, where she offloaded her cargo. The return voyage in ballast left Portsmouth on 7 October 1943 with convoy PW 411 reaching Milford Haven on 9 October. She then joined convoy ON 206 leaving Liverpool on 11 October 1943. Before reaching port, she collided with the British ship West Point, on 26 October and ran aground in a gale off of Sandy Hook, New Jersey. She was refloated on 23 November, and towed to New York City where she was declared a total loss.

== Target history ==
Instead of being scrapped, she was acquired by the US Navy in June 1944 and, after having her machinery removed, she was used as a target ship for early air to surface guided missiles, including the Pelican and ASM-N-2 Bat bombs. These tests were conducted off New York by planes flying from Floyd Bennett Field. A November 1944 gale broke James Longstreet loose from her mooring location. She was discovered drifting on 4 December 1944, and was towed to Naval Station Norfolk on 8 December. After being temporarily moored near Wolf Trap Light she resumed work as a bombing target in Pamlico Sound; but the sound was too shallow, and she once ran aground under tow to and from the target areas.

James Longstreet was then assigned as a target for Project Dove, where Polaroid Corporation was developing a heat-seeking bomb for the United States Navy. Earlier testing had been done using targets on Monomoy Island Gunnery Range south of Cape Cod, but the Navy wanted the system tested on a target more similar to the ships it was intended to hit. James Longstreet was towed from Chesapeake Bay on 26 February 1945, and reached Boston on 5 March. After being outfitted for her new role, she was scuttled on New Found Shoal in Cape Cod Bay at 09:46 25 April 1945 with most of the hull above water as a target for Navy air-to-surface missiles until 1970. She was then left derelict, becoming one of the most-photographed objects in the Bay, until April 1996, when waves submerged her in deeper water during a snowstorm.

The remains of James Longstreet, also referred to as "the target ship", lie approximately 3.5 nautical miles (4.0 mi; 6.5 km) off Eastham, Massachusetts in 20 to 25 feet (6.1 to 7.6 m) of water. The site is off limits to divers due to unexploded ordnance, but the remains of the ship can be observed above the water during extreme low tides.
