= Funryu =

- Type: Surface-to-air missile
- Place of origin: Japan

Service history
- In service: 1945
- Used by: Imperial Japanese Navy
- Wars: World War II

Production history
- Manufacturer: Yokosuka Naval Air Technical Arsenal

Specifications
- Mass: 1,900 kg (4,189 lb)
- Length: 4.0 m (13 ft)
- Width: 1.6 m (5 ft 3 in)
- Diameter: 0.6 m (2 ft 0 in)
- Guidance system: Command guidance

Funryu (奮龍, Funryū) were a series of surface-to-air anti-aircraft missiles developed in Japan at the end of the Second World War. The missile's development in the late stages of the war was plagued by organizational problems and cancelled before becoming operational.

In 1945, a few samples of SAM Funryu were created and tested, but due to the surrender of the Japanese Empire, had not been finalized. All the developments on the complex were destroyed after the end of hostilities.

The first design was the Funryu 1, an air-to-surface missile (ASM) specialized for anti-shipping use. Funryu 1 was much like a miniature airplane. The warhead contained 400 kg (882 lb) of explosive and guidance was via radio control. Testing of the Funryu 1 was conducted with the missile being dropped from a modified Mitsubishi G4M bomber. However, since perfecting the methods of controlling the missile in flight would take significant time and US bombing raids against Japan were intensifying at the time, it was decided that efforts should be directed towards surface-to-air missiles (SAMs). Thus, the Funryu 1 was shelved and became the only ASM of the Funryu family.

Two more advanced versions were called the Funryu 2 and the Funryu 4. The Funryu 2 was solid-fueled, 2.4 metres (7.9 ft) long, had a diameter of 30 centimetres (12 in) and weighed about 370 kilograms (815 lb). The Funryu 4 was liquid-fueled, 4.0 metres (13.1 ft) long, had a diameter of 61 centimetres (24 in) and weighed about 1,900 kilograms (4,190 lb).

Funryu 4, a much more conventionally shaped missile with four equally sized tail fins and elevons, would be guided primarily by radio control from the ground. The earlier Funryu 2 would be flown into the vicinity of its targets, then would glide the rest of the way. Funryu 4 was a high-speed design that could be flown directly at their target along the line of sight, making surface-to-air use possible.

The power plant was the KR-20 rocket engine with a thrust of 1,500 kgf (15 kN; 3,300 lbf) and 5 minutes of fuel, the same engine used on the rocket fighter J8M1. Since the engine was not powerful enough to launch the missile directly upwards with a full fuel tank, launches were instead performed at a 45° angle to the horizon, with climb relying on aerodynamic forces.

The control system was single-channel radio command guidance. Basic pulse signal frequency was 1 kHz, with the pulses divided into five groups. After every 200 pulses there was a short pause. The combination of these five 200-pulse groups could transmit five individual control commands: up, down, right, left, and detonation. Target-tracking and missile guidance were carried out visually, as well as by radar. The missile was detonated automatically when the radar signals of the target and the missile overlapped, indicating they were too close for the radar to tell apart. This type of radio-commanded detonation is also found in some post-WWII surface-to-air missiles.

A single prototype rocket was manufactured at Nagasaki, but was only bench tested for a single day on August 16, 1945 - a day after the end of hostilities.

Shortly thereafter, soldiers dynamited all equipment associated with the program "Funryu" so nothing associated with these missiles would get into American hands.

== See also ==
- Enzian
- Wasserfall
- Feuerlilie
- Rheintochter
- Ke-Go
- Kawasaki Ki-147 I-Go Type1 – Ko
- Kawasaki Ki-148
