= Mitsubishi Ki-147 =

Japanese World War II guided air-to-surface missile

Mitsubishi I-Gō Model 1 Kō
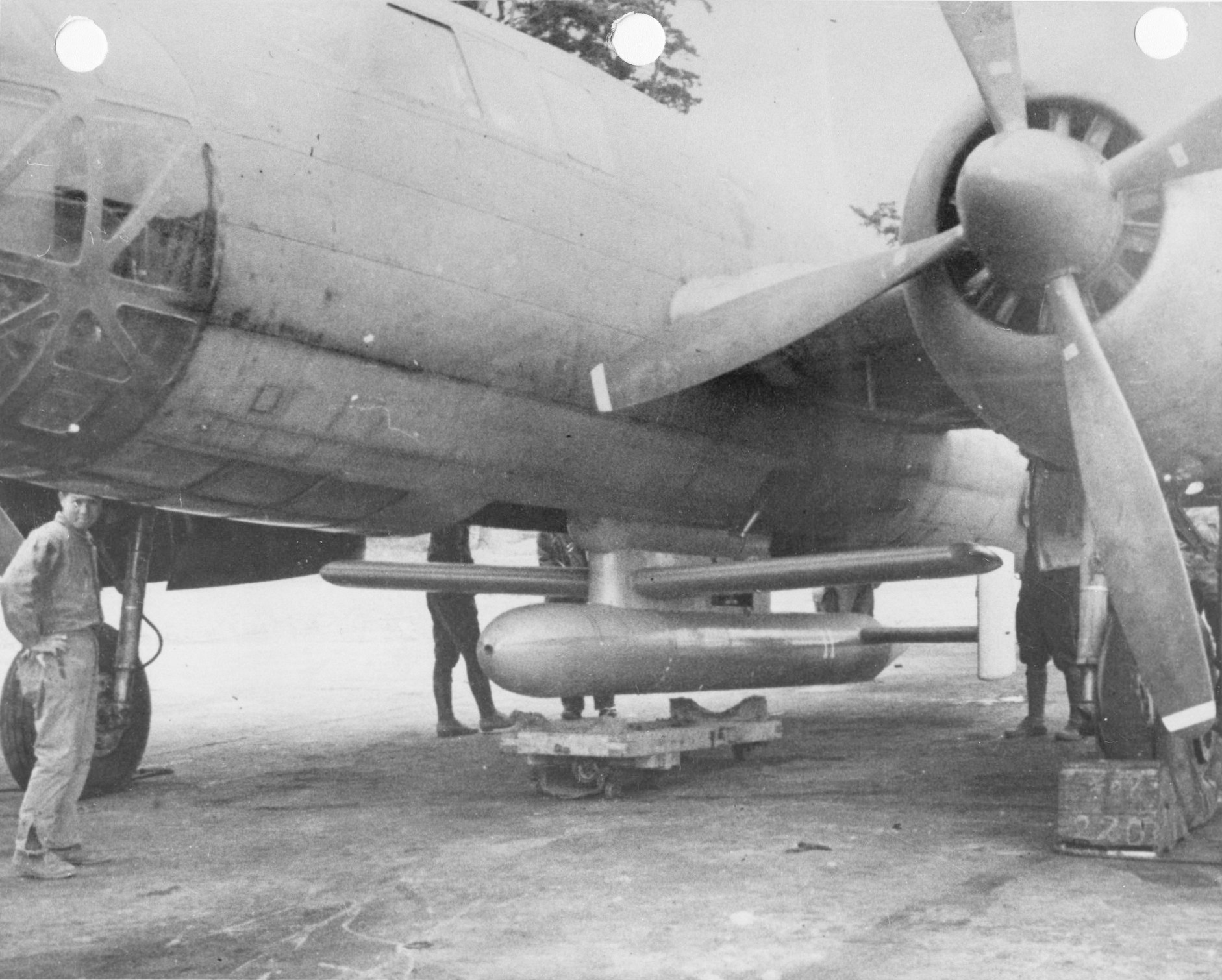
- Ki-147 prototype carried beneath a Mitsubishi Ki-67 heavy bomber
- Type: Guided air-to-surface missile
- Place of origin: Empire of Japan

Production history
- Designer: Mitsubishi Heavy Industries
- Designed: 1944
- Manufacturer: Mitsubishi Heavy Industries
- Produced: 1944–1945
- No. built: about 10–15 Model 1A test weapons (Note: Sources give slightly different figures. Ogawa gives 10 completed by November 1944, while the United States Strategic Bombing Survey reported about 15 Model 1A and 150 Model 1B weapons produced and tested.)

Specifications
- Mass: 1,400 kg (3,100 lb)
- Length: 5.77 m (18 ft 11 in)
- Height: 1.06 m (3 ft 6 in)
- Wingspan: 3.60 m (11 ft 10 in)
- Warhead: Navy No.80 800 kg armor-piercing bomb
- Warhead weight: 800 kg (1,800 lb)
- Engine: Toku-Ro Mark 1 Model 3 liquid-propellant rocket 240 kgf (2.4 kN; 530 lbf) for 75 s
- Propellant: Hydrogen peroxide with sodium permanganate catalyst;
- Maximum speed: 550 km/h (340 mph)
- Guidance system: MCLOS radio command
- Launch platform: Mitsubishi Ki-67

The Mitsubishi I-Gō Model 1 Kō (Japanese: イ号一型甲, I-Gō Ichi-gata Kō), also known by the Imperial Japanese Army designation Ki-147 or by its code I-Gō-1A, was a Japanese experimental radio-guided air-to-surface missile developed during the final year of World War II. It was designed by Mitsubishi Heavy Industries, alongside two other radio-guided weapons in the Army's I-Gō program: the smaller I-Gō Model 1B Otsu (Ki-148) and the I-Gō Model 1C Hei.

Development began in spring 1944, when Japanese Army planners sought a pilotless weapon that could increase the probability of hitting ships while reducing the losses associated with manned special-attack or ramming methods. The weapon was designed as a stand-off weapon against U.S. and Allied warships, carrying a Navy No.80 800 kg armor-piercing bomb and guided from a parent aircraft via manual radio control. Carried beneath a Mitsubishi Ki-67 heavy bomber which would serve as the control aircraft, it was to be released several kilometres from the target and guided visually by an operator in the parent aircraft using radio commands. Unlike a conventional bomb, the Ki-147 had wings, a liquid-fuel rocket motor, gyroscopic stabilisation and radio-command controls. It depended throughout its flight on an operator who had to keep both target and weapon in sight.

The first Mitsubishi-built Model 1 Kō was completed in October 1944 and flight-tested from the Ki-67 later that year. Persistent problems with the gyro stabiliser and radio-control system prevented the missile from entering operational service before the end of the war.

== Background ==
Research into guided weapons had been conducted in Japan on a limited scale since the 1930s. In early 1944, Army engineers proposed a guided alternative to manned ramming attacks. The concept involved a “parent–child” system, in which a carrier aircraft radio-controlled a released flying bomb toward its target. The system also offered a response to increasingly effective Allied anti‑aircraft fire, which frequently destroyed kamikaze aircraft before they could reach their targets. Radio control was expected to improve hit probability. This proposal led to the Japanese I-Gō guided missile program under the joint control of the Army and Navy.

The initial research and development on the I-Gō was carried out by the Japanese Army Aerotechnical Research Institute (or Rikugun Kokugijutsu Kenkyujo) in Tachikawa, Tokyo. The research results were eventually transferred in late May or early June 1944 to Mitsubishi, Kawasaki and the Aeronautical Research Institute of Tokyo University to commence final development of the I-Gō.

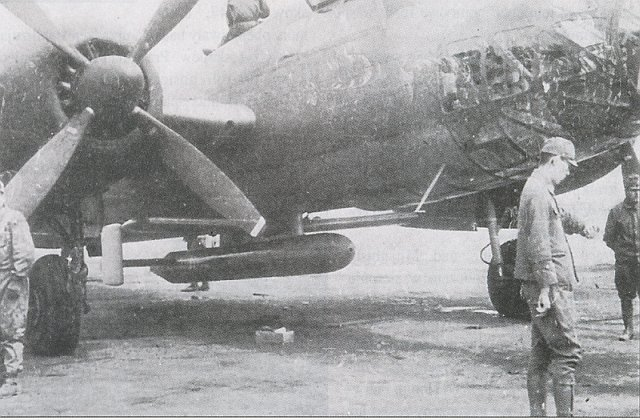
Ki-147 underneath a Ki-67 heavy bomber

The original plan called for three types of radio-guided flying bombs, designated the I-Gō-1A, I-Gō-1B and I-Gō-1C models. The Model 1A Kō (Ki-147), carrying a Navy No.80 800 kg armor-piercing bomb and produced by Mitsubishi, was intended for use against battleships and aircraft carriers, while the Model 1B Otsu (Ki-148), carrying a 300 kg bomb and produced by Kawasaki Aircraft was to be employed against destroyers and cargo vessels. The Mitsubishi Ki-67-Ia "Hiryū" heavy bomber was the designated mother aircraft of the Ki-147, while the Ki-148 was to be carried by the Kawasaki Ki-48-II light bomber or the Kawasaki Ki-102 B "Otsu" ground attack fighter.

In the spring of 1944, the Aeronautical Research Institute of Tokyo Imperial University became responsible for developing the I-Gō Model 1C (I-Gō-1C), the final iteration of the I-Gō program. It adopted a fundamentally different guidance concept, dispensing with radio control in favor of a novel system that utilized shockwaves generated by naval gunfire to direct the missile. Intended primarily for anti-ship operations, the system sought to guide the weapon by sensing and tracking pressure disturbances during naval engagements, effectively aiming toward a fire-and-forget capability so long as enemy ships were actively firing.

Development orders for the Ki-147 were issued to Mitsubishi in July 1944, with the company tasked with both the airframe and the engine. By the end of October 1944, Kawasaki had completed the first Model B, which was tested in conjunction with the Ki-48. The following month, the first Mitsubishi-built I-Gō 1A was released from a Ki-67 carrier aircraft off the coast of Chōshi. In total, approximately 15 Model 1A and 150 Model 1B missiles were produced and tested. Effort was eventually concentrated on perfecting the Model 1A, owing to its fewer electrical problems and heavier warhead.

== Design ==
=== Airframe ===
The Ki-147 was a disposable, single-use weapon of simplified construction. It featured a high-wing monoplane layout with straight, unswept wooden wings, accommodating the internal receiving antenna. The fuselage consisted of a circular metal framework covered with sheet metal. The main wing was positioned toward the forward section of the fuselage. At the rear, the tail assembly comprised twin vertical fins flanking the rocket nozzle exhaust, an arrangement also used on the Ki-148. The main difference from the Ki-148 was the addition of a cylindrical container mounted above the wing.

=== Propulsion ===
The Ki-147 was powered by a Mitsubishi Toku-Ro Mark 1 Model 3 liquid-propellant rocket engine, while the Ki-148 used the Mitsubishi Toku-Ro Mark 1 Model 2 rocket engine producing 1.5 kN (340 lbf) of thrust. It used aqueous hydrogen peroxide as propellant and a sodium permanganate solution as a catalyst. The propellants were fed into the combustion chamber by compressed air, producing 2.4 kN (540 lbf) of thrust for 75 seconds. The missile attained a maximum speed of approximately 550 km/h.

=== Guidance ===
Guidance was performed by an operator aboard the carrier aircraft using MCLOS (Manual Command to Line of Sight) radio control. The operator had no optical aid for controlling the missile, nor was visibility improved by any flame or smoke trail. For night use, a tail light was added to help maintain the missile’s course. The operator visually tracked the missile and transmitted control inputs in azimuth and elevation, commanding it into a dive shortly before reaching the target.

Stabilization was provided by a simple autopilot using single-axis directional gyroscopes. Immediately prior to launch, these were spun using electrical power supplied by the carrying aircraft, then uncaged prior to release, retaining usable angular momentum. Stabilization remained effective for approximately one to two minutes before losing stability and tumbling. The autopilot, manufactured by Sumitomo Communication Industry, consisted of a single-axis directional gyro coupled to two servomotors that provided simultaneous rudder and aileron control, with a similar arrangement for the elevator. The control surfaces were actuated by the same compressed air used to pressurize the propellant feed to the combustion chamber.

The Ki-147 employed a MCLOS radio-guidance system manufactured by Sumitomo Communication. An operator aboard the carrier aircraft transmitted control commands, via a simple radio system, that displaced the reference point of a single-axis gyroscope, causing the missile’s control surfaces to move until a new equilibrium was reached. The radio-control equipment consisted of custom receiver tuned to a modified Army Type Tobi-4 communication transmitter. It operated using tone modulation across one of six selectable VHF bands within the 35–58 MHz range. In theory, this allowed up to six missiles to be controlled simultaneously without mutual interference. The system permitted only one control input at a time and lacked proportional control or feedback, resulting in coarse, step-like flight corrections. Each missile could respond to only a single tone at any given time, corresponding to a single control input. Approximately 220 receivers were reportedly manufactured for the I-Gō-1A and I-Gō-1B programs, of which around 100 were expended during testing. In addition, about 10 transmitters were modified for installation in the controlling aircraft.

Electrical power for the onboard systems, including gyro pickoffs, servomotors, and the radio receiver, was supplied by an internal battery that provided approximately five minutes of power. As propellant was consumed and feed pressure dropped, the effectiveness of the control surfaces diminished progressively during the latter stages of each flight.

== Operational concept ==
The intended attack profile required the carrier Mitsubishi Ki-67 to advance to within 10–11 km of the target and to release the missile from an altitude of 700–1,000 m. After release, its safety device was deactivated 0.5 seconds later and the rocket engine ignited 1.5 seconds after that. A preset altimeter caused it to level off at an altitude of 30–150 m about 5 km from its target.

The carrier aircraft's speed at release was approximately 360 km/h and the missile was designed to strike its target at a terminal speed of 550 km/h. To maintain radio control throughout the approach, the carrier aircraft was required to be within 4,000 m of the Ki-147. The missile followed a “stair-step” glide path in the vertical plane and executed lateral corrections in discrete increments of up to approximately 25°, producing a zig-zag trajectory as successive control inputs were applied.

This operational requirement of maintaining continuous guidance during an extended approach toward the target significantly increased the carrier aircraft's exposure to enemy interceptors. Army planners drew an unfavourable comparison with the experience of Navy Mitsubishi G4M bombers carrying the manned Yokosuka MXY-7 Ohka special attack aircraft. Despite fighter escort, G4M carriers had suffered severe losses before weapon release, as the weight of the Ohka prevented them from taking evasive action under fighter attack. Under conditions of limited air superiority, the prospect of a carrier aircraft approaching to within 4,000 m of a defended target while maintaining unbroken radio contact was expected to result in substantial losses.

== Testing ==
The first prototype of the Ki-147 was completed in October 1944 and 10 missiles were completed in November. Drop tests were subsequently conducted. Approximately 17 missiles were test-flown, with between 70% and 80% being assessed as effective hits, although persistent control and equipment faults limited reliability.

In total, about 150 missiles of all types were built but due to malfunction of the gyro stabilizer and difficulties in adjusting the radio control equipment, the missile never entered operational service. Prior to the arrival of the US occupation forces to Japan, all approximately 200 I-Gō missiles had been destroyed.

== Specifications ==
- Length: 5.77 m (18 ft 11 in)
- Wingspan: 3.60 m (11 ft 10 in)
- Height: 1.06 m (3 ft 6 in)
- Wing area: 3.60 m^{2} (39 sq ft)
- All-up weight: 1,400 kg
- Main engine: 1 × Toku-Ro Mark 1 Model 3 rocket (240 kgf)
- Maximum speed: 550 km/h
- Range: 11 km (6.8 mi)
- Warhead: Navy No.80 800 kg armor-piercing bomb

== See also ==
- Funryu
- Ke-Go
- Yokosuka MXY-7 Ohka
- Guided bomb

== Bibliography ==
- Caidin, Martin (1956). "Japanese Guided Missiles in World War II". Journal of Jet Propulsion. 26 (8): 691–696. doi:10.2514/8.7117.
- Bōeichō Bōei Kenshūjo Senshishitsu [in Japanese] (January 1975). 陸軍航空兵器の開発・生産・補給 [Development, Production and Supply of Army Aviation Weapons]. Senshi Sōsho (in Japanese). Vol. 87. Asagumo Shinbunsha. pp. 458–459, 527–529.
- Dilworth, J.A. (December 1945). "Japanese radio-controlled flying bomb "I-Gō"". Japanese Guided Missiles (PDF). US Naval Technical Mission to Japan. pp. 20–25. Archived from the original (PDF) on 2011-09-27.
- Deibel, R.F. (December 1945). "Control Systems for Pilotless Aircraft". Japanese Guided Missiles (PDF). US Naval Technical Mission to Japan. pp. 11–15. Report No. 32; Enclosure B; Serial No. 101. Archived from the original (PDF) on 2011-09-27.
- Dyer, Edwin (2009). Japanese Secret Projects: Experimental Aircraft of the IJA and IJN 1939–1945. Midland Publishing. ISBN 978-1-85780-317-4.
- Everett, H. R. (2015). Unmanned Systems of World Wars I and II. Intelligent Robotics and Autonomous Agents Ser. Michael Toscano. Cambridge: MIT Press. pp. 387–391. ISBN 978-0-262-33177-7.
- Francillon, René J. (1979). Japanese aircraft of the Pacific War (2nd ed.). London: Putnam. ISBN 0-370-30251-6.
- Gunston, Bill (1979). The Illustrated Encyclopedia of the World's Rockets & Missiles. Salamander Books. p. 113.
- Grunden, Walter E. (2005). Secret weapons and World War II: Japan in the shadow of big science. Modern war studies. Lawrence, Kan: University Press of Kansas. ISBN 978-0-7006-1383-0.
- Iiyama, Yukinobu (2015). WWII 世界のロケット機 [WWII Rocket Aircraft from Around the World]. NF Bunko (in Japanese). Kojinsha. ISBN 978-4-7698-2870-9.
- Ishiguro, Ryusuke (2009). Japanese special attack aircraft and flying bombs. Sandomierz, Poland : STRATUS; Redbourn : Mushroom Model. pp. 216–220. ISBN 978-83-89450-12-8.
- "I-Gō Type1 – Ko". Kōkū Fan (1): 82, 16. 1961.
- "I-Gō Type1 – Ko". Kōkū Fan (１0): 23–25. 1965.
- "I-Gō Type1 – Ko". Kōkū Jōhō (9): 94–95. 1957.
- Military Analysis Division (January 1947). "XIV. Guided missiles and proximity fuzes". Japanese Air Weapons and Tactics. United States Strategic Bombing Survey. pp. 59–60.
- Nohara, Shigeru (October 2005). 日本軍用機事典 陸軍篇 1910–1945 [Encyclopedia of Japanese Military Aircraft: Army Edition, 1910–1945] (in Japanese). Ikaros Publishing. pp. 156–157. ISBN 978-4871497329.
- Ogawa, Toshihiko (August 2003). 幻の新鋭機: 逆転を賭けた傑作機 [Phantom Advanced Aircraft: Masterpiece Planes Built to Turn the Tide]. NF Bunko (in Japanese). Kōjinsha. pp. 294–299. ISBN 978-4769821427.
- "The I-Gō (IJA) – WarHistory.org". warhistory.org. 2019-05-31.
