= Project Pigeon =

Canceled pigeon-controlled guided bomb program

During World War II, Project Pigeon (later Project Orcon, for "organic control") was American behaviorist B. F. Skinner's attempt to develop a pigeon-controlled guided bomb.

== Overview ==
In the late 1930s, behaviorist B. F. Skinner was using pigeons in his research into operant conditioning, successfully training the birds to perform tricks. After the United States entered World War II, Skinner sought to use the same techniques to train pigeons to act as "pilots" for a bomb. Eventually, he devised a guidance system that was operated by a pigeon pecking at three spots arranged in a triangle. Once the pigeon reached a situation where it sensed the image was centered it pecked the center and the device locked on the target and remained so until impact. In June 1943, the Office of Scientific Research and Development funded Skinner's proposal for a homing guidance system under the name Project Pigeon.

The guidance system consisted of three lenses mounted in the nose of the bomb, which projected an image of the target onto screens affixed in a small compartment inside the nose cone. These screens were then mounted on pivots and fitted with sensors that measured any angular movement. One to three pigeons trained to recognize a target were stationed in front of their screens; when they saw the target, they would peck at the screens. They were trained by being shown an image of the target, with progressively faster pecking required to earn grains of food. One bird pecked more than 10,000 times in 45 minutes. As long as the target remained in the center of the screen, the screen would not move, but if the bomb began to drift off course, the image would move toward the edge of the screen. The pigeons would follow the image, pecking at it, tilting the screen on its pivots. When two possible targets were on the screen, Skinner noted that at least two of the birds would be in agreement, and the dissenter would be "punished for his minority opinion" to encourage it to choose the target preferred by the majority. The sensors would detect the movement and send signals to the control surfaces, which would steer the bomb in the direction the screen moved. As the bomb turned back toward the target, the pigeons would again follow the image, bringing the screen back to the center position. In this manner, the pigeons would correct any deviations in the course and keep the bomb on its glide path. Early electronic guidance systems used similar methods, with electronic signals and processors in place of the birds in detecting the target and preventing deviation from the glide path.

The National Defense Research Committee (part of the OSRD) regarded the idea of using pigeons to guide glide bombs as eccentric and impractical, but it still contributed $25,000 to the research. Despite progress in training, Skinner later complained: "Our problem was no one would take us seriously". Similar pigeon-based guidance was briefly considered for the SWOD Mark 7 but rejected in favor of radar.

Project Pigeon was canceled in October 1944 because the military believed that "further prosecution of this project would seriously delay others which in the minds of the Division have more immediate promise of combat application." The project was briefly revived by the U.S. Navy in 1948 as "Project Orcon", but was again canceled in 1953 once electronic guidance systems were proven reliable.

In 2024, Skinner was posthumously awarded the Ig Nobel Peace Prize for his work on the project; his daughter Julie Vargas, who received the award in his stead, said in her acceptance speech: "I want to thank you for finally acknowledging his most important contribution. People know him only for discovering operant conditioning, schedules of reinforcement, and for books like Walden Two, Verbal Behavior, Beyond Freedom & Dignity, and more. Even the B. F. Skinner Foundation fails to put a missile on its hat, so thank you for finally putting the record straight."

== See also ==
- Animal-borne bomb attacks
- Anti-tank dog
- Bat bomb (incendiary ordnance)
- Ethology
- Military animals
- Pigeon intelligence
- War pigeon
- Blue peacock (chicken powered nuclear mine)
