= LBD Gargoyle =

Gargoyle
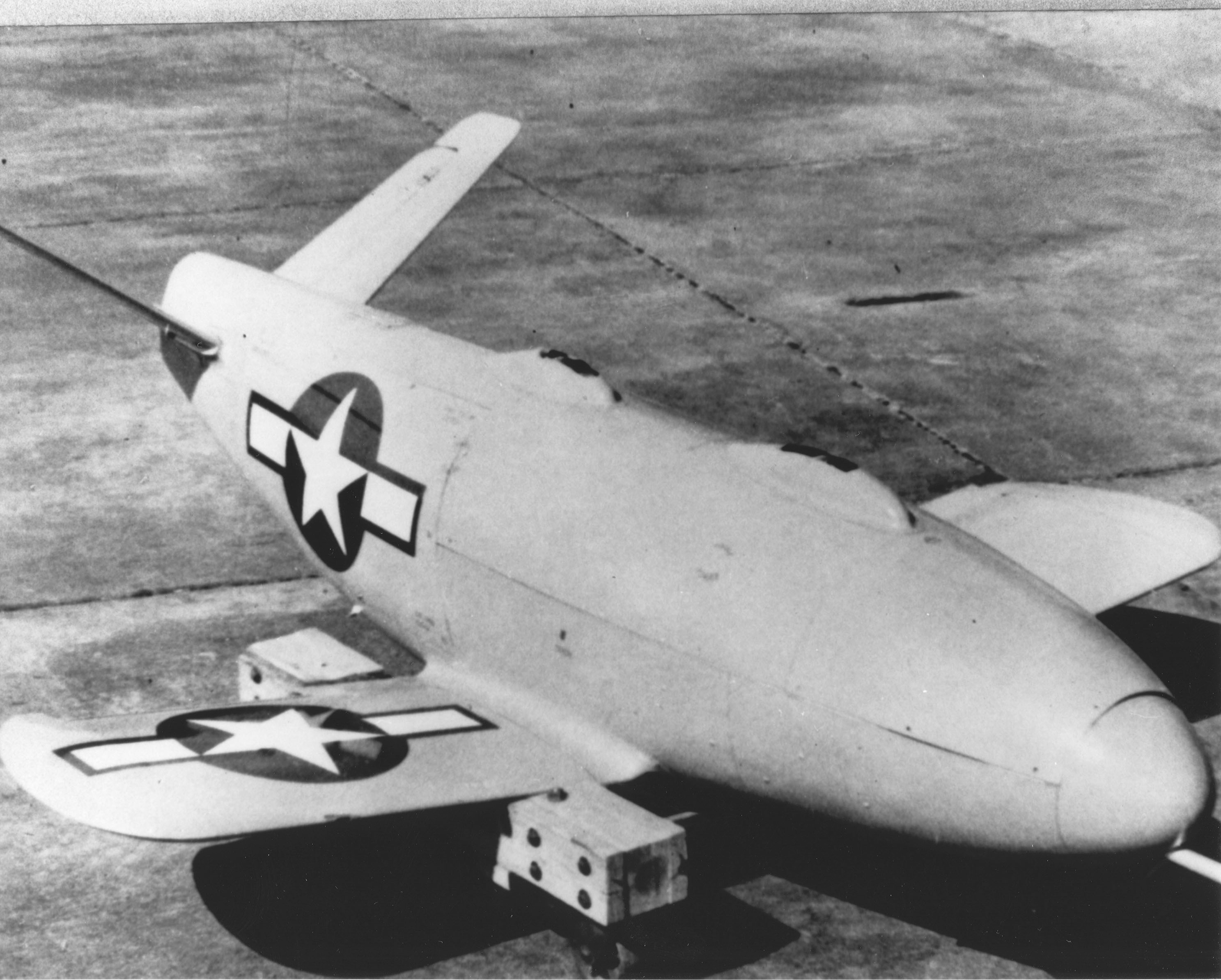
- LBD-1 at Mojave in 1946.
- Type: anti-ship missile / guided bomb
- Place of origin: United States

Service history
- In service: 1945-1950
- Used by: United States Navy
- Wars: World War II (test only)

Production history
- Manufacturer: McDonnell Aircraft
- Produced: 1944-1947
- No. built: 200

Specifications
- Mass: 1,500 lb (680 kg)
- Length: 10 ft 1 in (3.07 m)
- Wingspan: 8 ft 6 in (2.59 m)
- Warhead: armor-piercing bomb
- Warhead weight: 1,000 lb (450 kg)
- Engine: Aerojet 8AS1000 JATO bottle 1,000 lbf (4.4 kN) for 8 sec
- Propellant: solid fuel
- Operational range: 5 mi (8.0 km)
- Maximum speed: 600 mph (970 km/h)
- Guidance system: radio command guidance

The LBD-1 Gargoyle (later KSD-1, KUD-1 and RTV-N-2) is an American air-to-surface missile developed during World War II by McDonnell Aircraft for the United States Navy. One of the precursors of modern anti-ship missiles, it was extensively used as a test vehicle during the late 1940s.

== Design and development ==
Following the successful use of the German Henschel Hs 293 and Fritz-X guided bombs in combat during 1943, a requirement was issued by the U.S. Navy that October for a guided weapon based on similar principles. Assigned as part of the Glomb ("glide bomb") project, the weapon was code-named "Gargoyle", and following the completion of design work in the summer of 1944, McDonnell Aircraft was awarded a contract for a test-and-evaluation production run of 400 Gargoyles in September, given the designation LBD-1.

Intended for carriage by carrier-based aircraft, Gargoyle was of fairly conventional small-aircraft design, weighing 1,500 pounds (680 kg) when ready for launch, and fitted with a low-mounted 8-foot-6-inch (2.59 m) wing and v-tail attached to a streamlined fuselage, 10 feet 1 inch (3.07 m) in length, containing a 1,000-pound (450 kg) armor-piercing bomb. An Aerojet solid-propellant rocket, of the JATO type and providing 1,000 lbf (4.4 kN) of thrust, was fitted to provide terminal boost to 600 miles per hour (970 km/h), and guidance was by radio command, the missile being tracked visually via a flare mounted in the tail section. The effective range of Gargoyle was 5 miles (8.0 km) when released at an altitude of 27,000 feet (8,200 m).

== Operational history ==
Gargoyle's armor-piercing capability and the fact that it could be carried by carrier-based aircraft allowed development to continue despite late-war rationalizations of missile projects, and following delivery of the first weapons to the Navy at the end of 1944 flight trials were begun in March 1945. Difficulties encountered during the test program meant that by July only five of fourteen tests were considered to be "satisfactory" by the Navy, and the first fully successful flight did not occur until July 1946. By then Gargoyle had been redesignated twice, to KSD-1 in October 1945 and in early 1946 to KUD-1 as a pure research effort. The aerodynamic design of Gargoyle was, however, considered to be satisfactory from an aerodynamic standpoint; however, with the end of the war, the contract was reduced first to 375 missiles, and then to 200, with the production run being completed by the summer of 1947. That fall the Gargoyle was redesignated again under the U.S. Navy's new missile designation system, first to RTV-2 and then to the definitive RTV-N-2 in 1948. Testing continued through December 1950, Gargoyle being used to trial equipment and procedures for the Navy's other missile programs at the Marine Corps Auxiliary Air Station Mojave, before the program was finally terminated, the remaining RTV-N-2s being designated for scrapping.

== Surviving aircraft ==
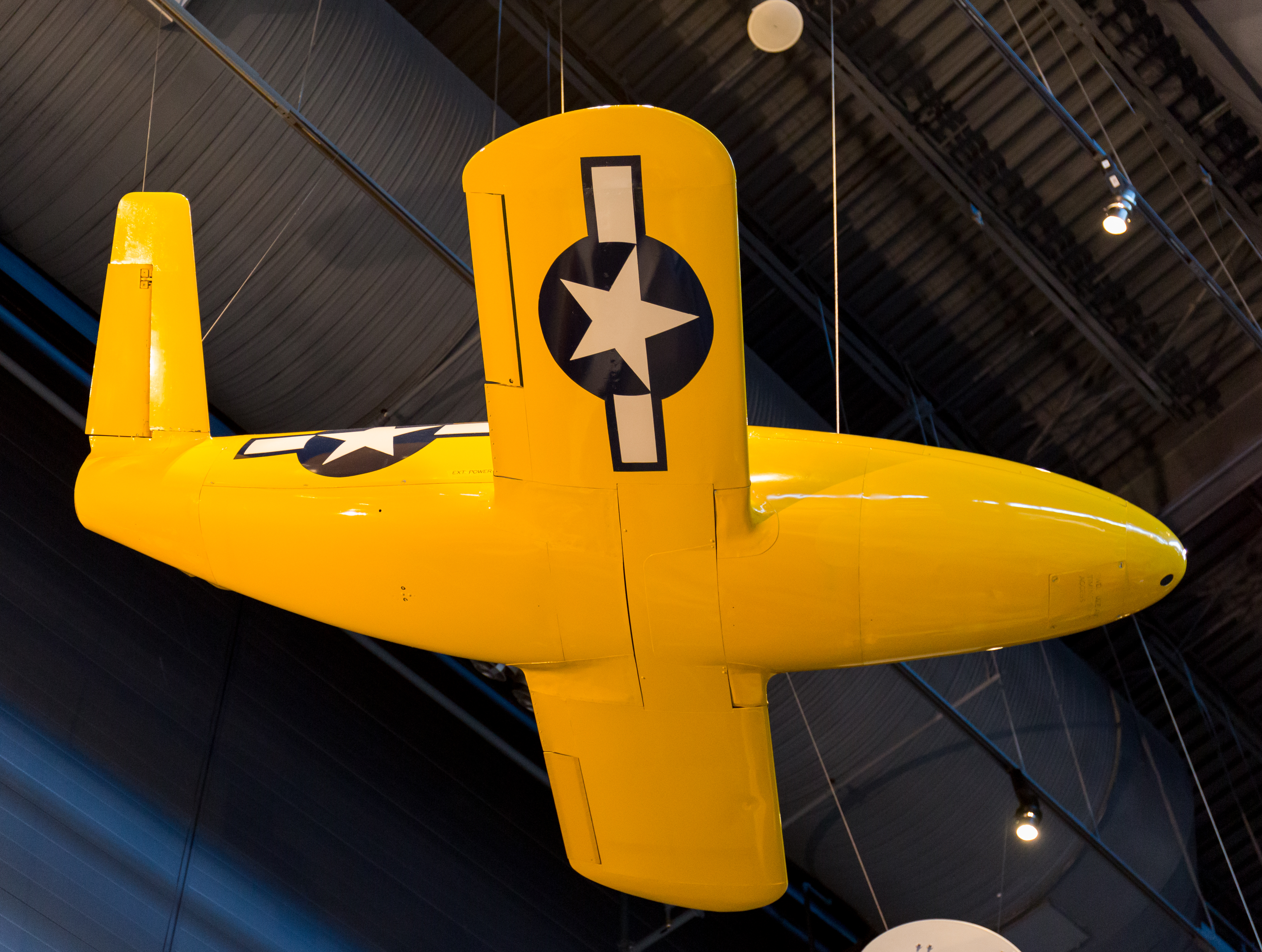
A Gargoyle Missile on display at the Steven F. Udvar-Hazy Center

A Gargoyle that was donated to the National Air and Space Museum in 1974 is on display at the Steven F. Udvar-Hazy Center.

== See also ==
- Azon
- GB-1
- VB-6 Felix

Related lists

- List of anti-ship missiles
