= Kawasaki Ki-48 =

Japanese light bomber

Ki-48
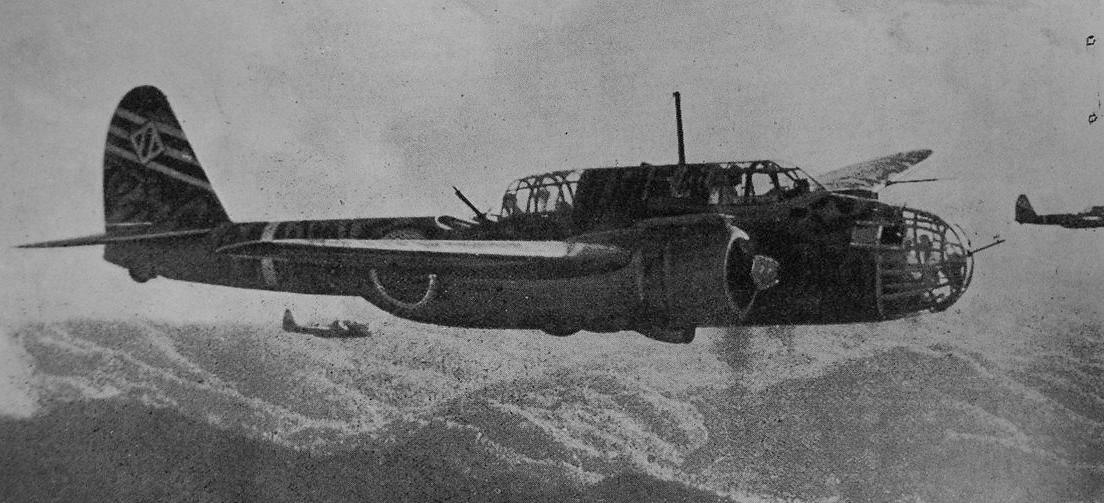
- Kawasaki Ki-48

General information
- Type: Light bomber
- Manufacturer: Kawasaki Kōkūki Kōgyō K.K.
- Designer: Takeo Doi
- Status: Retired
- Primary user: Imperial Japanese Army Air Force
- Number built: 1,997

History
- Introduction date: 1940
- Retired: 1945

The Kawasaki Ki-48 (Japanese: 九九式雙發輕爆擊機, romanized: kyuukyuu-shiki-souhatu-keibaku-gekki, shortened to 'Soukei', Army Type 99 Twin-engined Light Bomber), is a Japanese twin-engine light bomber that was used during World War II. Its Allied reporting name was "Lily".

== Design and development ==
The development of the aircraft began at the end of 1937 at the request of the Japanese military high command. Kawasaki received an order to develop a "high-speed bomber" capable of 480 km/h (300 mph) at 3,000 m (9,800 ft), and able to reach 5,000 m (16,000 ft) within 10 minutes. The design was inspired by the Soviet Tupolev SB.

Kawasaki had the advantage of the experience of designing the Ki-45 twin-engined heavy fighter. Most technical problems were solved; however the aircraft had a number of shortcomings. It carried an 800 kg (1,760 lb) bombload. This was slightly less than contemporary light bombers such as the A-20 Havoc, and the similar-appearing Martin Maryland and Baltimore. Speed was intended to be its primary defense, much like the later, unarmed, de Havilland Mosquito, so it had only three machine guns (an equivalent armament to contemporary light bombers). This made it vulnerable to enemy fighters later in the war, once they became fast enough to actually catch it. The flight characteristics of the Ki-48 also left much to be desired. Newer generations of Allied fighters caught up in speed, and eventually, the Ki-48 was too slow to outrun them, while superior modern Japanese aircraft, such as the Yokosuka P1Y and the Mitsubishi Ki-67, could only be produced in small numbers. The first versions were lightly armoured, so the Ki-48 was quite aerobatic, and could loop and turn with an experienced pilot at the controls. The aircraft was often used as a dive bomber in Burma. The aircraft was not necessarily a failure, and was considered an acceptable light bomber for the first few years of the war by many historians. Much like the Mitsubishi A6M Zero fighter, it was satisfactory for the period when it was designed and produced.

== Operational history ==
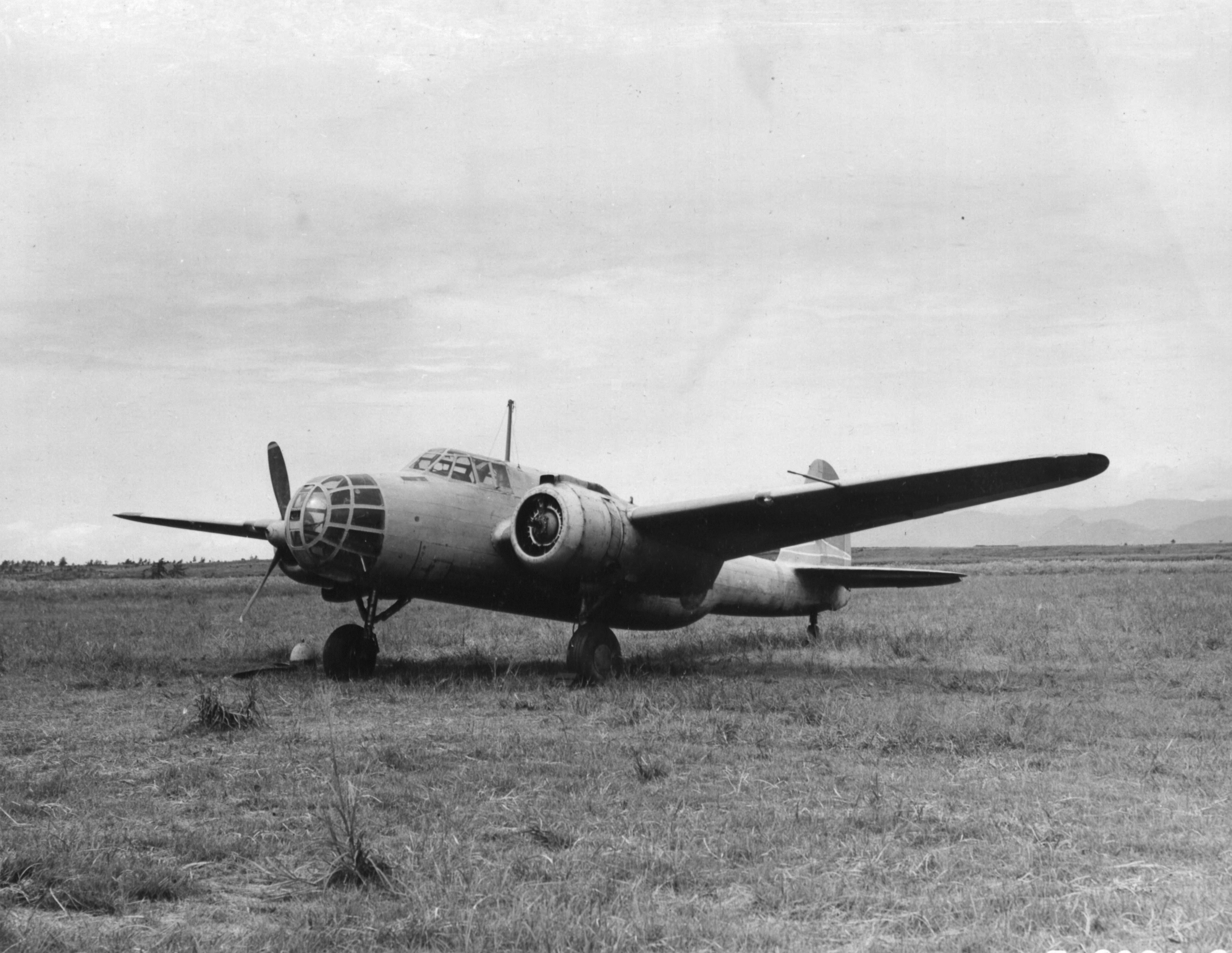
Kawasaki Ki-48 after Japanese surrender

The aircraft served in China from June 1940, replacing the Kawasaki Ki-32, and were widely used in the Philippines, Malaya, Burma, New Guinea, the Solomon Islands and the Dutch East Indies, where the Ki-48 Ia and Ib models, slow and badly armed, were supplemented by the marginally improved Ki-48 IIa and IIc, which were maintained in service along with the older types until the end of the war.

All models continued in service until the Battle of Okinawa during April 1945, when many were converted into kamikaze aircraft (Ki-48-II KAI Tai-Atari) armed with an 800 kg (1,760 lb) bomb. Some aircraft were modified to act as testbeds; one carried the Kawasaki Ki-148 guided missile intended for use on the Kawasaki Ki-102 in late 1944, and one was modified to test a Ne-0 pulsejet engine in late 1944 to early 1945.

The fact that all models continued in service until 1945 reflects that many Ki-48s survived more often than not. This was due to the use of small ship formations (three to ten aircraft) escorted by large numbers of fighters (25–75), typically Nakajima Ki-43s. Although not as fast as more modern fighters, after 1942, the aircraft was still fast enough to enable it to often avoid interception unless it ran into a standing patrol of fighters. The 90th Air Regiment of the 5th Air Army (based in Hopei, north China) equipped with Ki-48s was the only Japanese air unit in China proper to engage the Soviets, although others were advanced in preparation. It flew 20 sorties against the Soviets during 14 August 1945.

=== Ki-48 Special Attack Unit ===
The British Pacific Fleet departed from Ceylon on 16 January 1945 en route to Australia and struck Japanese-held oil wells and refineries at Palembang, Sumatra on 24–29 January 1945 in Operation Meridian.

On 29 January, seven Kawasaki Ki-48 of the Army's Shichisi Mitate Tokubetsu Kōgeki Tai counter-attacked the Allied fleet at low level as the British aircraft were returning from Palembang. The British radar picture was confused by the presence of over 100 friendly aircraft, and the first two or three Supermarine Seafire CAP interceptions did not occur until just before the Ki-48 formation entered the air defence zone. The last pair of Seafires chased the five remaining Ki-48s inside the screen and, with the support of returning Vought F4U Corsairs and Grumman F6F Hellcats which had just been scrambled, shot down all of them, amongst intense AA fire. One Seafire was slightly damaged and one Hellcat was written off due to friendly fire, but the only ship to be damaged was the carrier HMS Illustrious, hit by heavy AA shells.

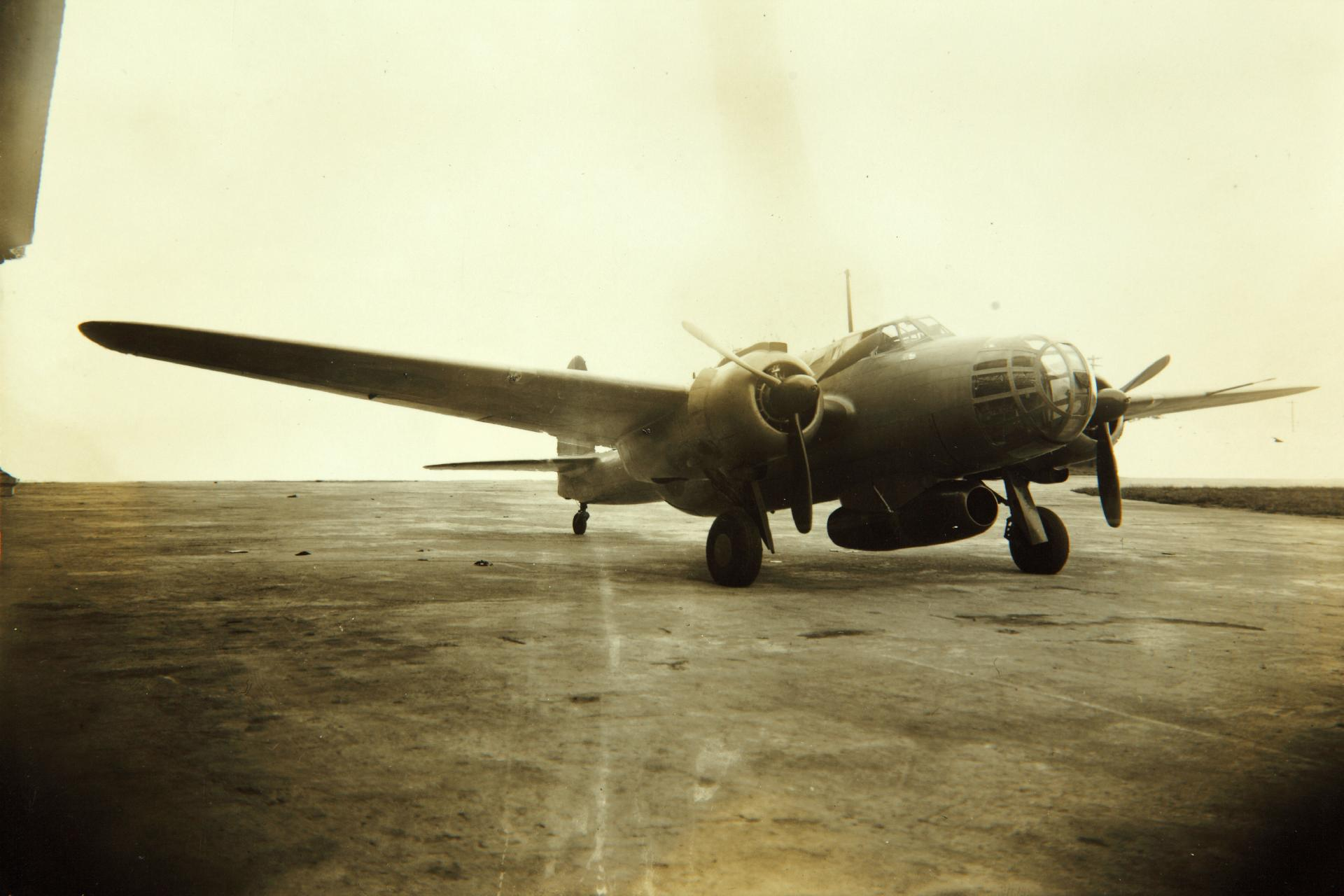
A modified Ki-48 with a Ne-0 turbojet under the bomb bay during testing

Such success, minor by Pacific fighting standards at the time, gave the British Pacific Fleet useful expertise and confidence in its ability to deal with kamikaze attacks.

== Variants ==
Ki-48
Four prototypes with 708 kW (963 hp) Nakajima Ha25 engines and five pre-production aircraft, with modified tail surfaces.
Ki-48-Ia
Army Type 99 Twin Engine Light Bomber Model 1A; as first series model. Produced from 1940, 557 built.
Ki-48-Ib,
Similar to the Ia, with changes in defensive machine gun mountings.

- Total production of Ki-48 Ia and Ib: 557 aircraft

Ki-48-II
Three prototypes built.
Ki-48-IIa
Fitted with more powerful engines, a longer fuselage, additional armour, and larger bomb load. Produced from April 1942.
Ki-48-IIb
Dive bomber version, with reinforced fuselage and dive brakes.
Ki-48-IIc
Improved defensive weapons. Produced from 1943.

- Total production of Ki-48 IIa, IIb and IIc: 1,408 aircraft

Ki-48-II KAI Kamikaze (Type Tai-Atari)
Conversion with 800 kg (1,760 lb) of explosives and two or three crew for kamikaze missions
Ki-66
Nose turret removed and replaced with solid nose fitted with 2x fixed forward firing 12.7mm machine guns. 8 prototypes built of varying configurations. None selected for mass production due to minimal increase in speed. Dive brakes used on Ki-48 IIb.
Ki-81
Proposed version of the Ki-48. Not built.
Ki-174
Single-seat special attack version. Not built.

- Total production of all versions: 1,997 aircraft

== Operators ==
Japan

- Imperial Japanese Army Air Force
  - 3rd Attack Air Combat Regiment (June 1942 – June 1945)
  - 6th Attack Air Combat Regiment (1942–1945)
  - 8th Light Bomber Air Combat Regiment (August 1941 – 1945)
  - 12th Light Bomber Air Combat Regiment (April 1944 – August 1945)
  - 16th Light Bomber Air Combat Regiment (1941–1945)
  - 34th Light Bomber Air Combat Regiment (October 1942 – April 1944)
  - 35th Light Bomber Air Combat Regiment (1942–1944)
  - 45th Attack Air Combat Regiment (July 1940 – February 1944)
  - 65th Attack/Light Bomber Air Combat Regiment (1940 – July 1941)
  - 75th Attack Air Combat Regiment (1941 – April 1945)
  - 90th Light Bomber Air Combat Regiment (October 1941 – August 1945)
  - 206th Light Bomber Air Combat Regiment (June 1941 – July 1941)
  - 208th Light Bomber Air Combat Regiment (March 1941 – May 1945)
  - 82nd Independent Light Bomber Company (1940–1942)
  - 21st Independent Headquarters Flight (July 1939-15 October 1942)
  - Hokota Army Light Bomber Flying School
  - Hokota Light Bomber Instructing Flight Division
  - Mito Army Flying School
  - Army Aviation Maintenance School
  - Tokorozawa Army Aviation Maintenance School

China

- Chinese Nationalist Air Force
  - 6th Group
    - 5th Squadron operated captured aircraft.

People's Republic of China

- Chinese Communist Air Force operated captured aircraft. The last Ki-48 retired from training role in 1952.

Indonesia

- Indonesian Air Force –then Indonesian People's Security Force– operated one aircraft against Dutch colonial rule. This aircraft was put together from bits and pieces of a number of aircraft to become the first twin-engined bomber in the Indonesian People's Security Force.

== Surviving aircraft ==
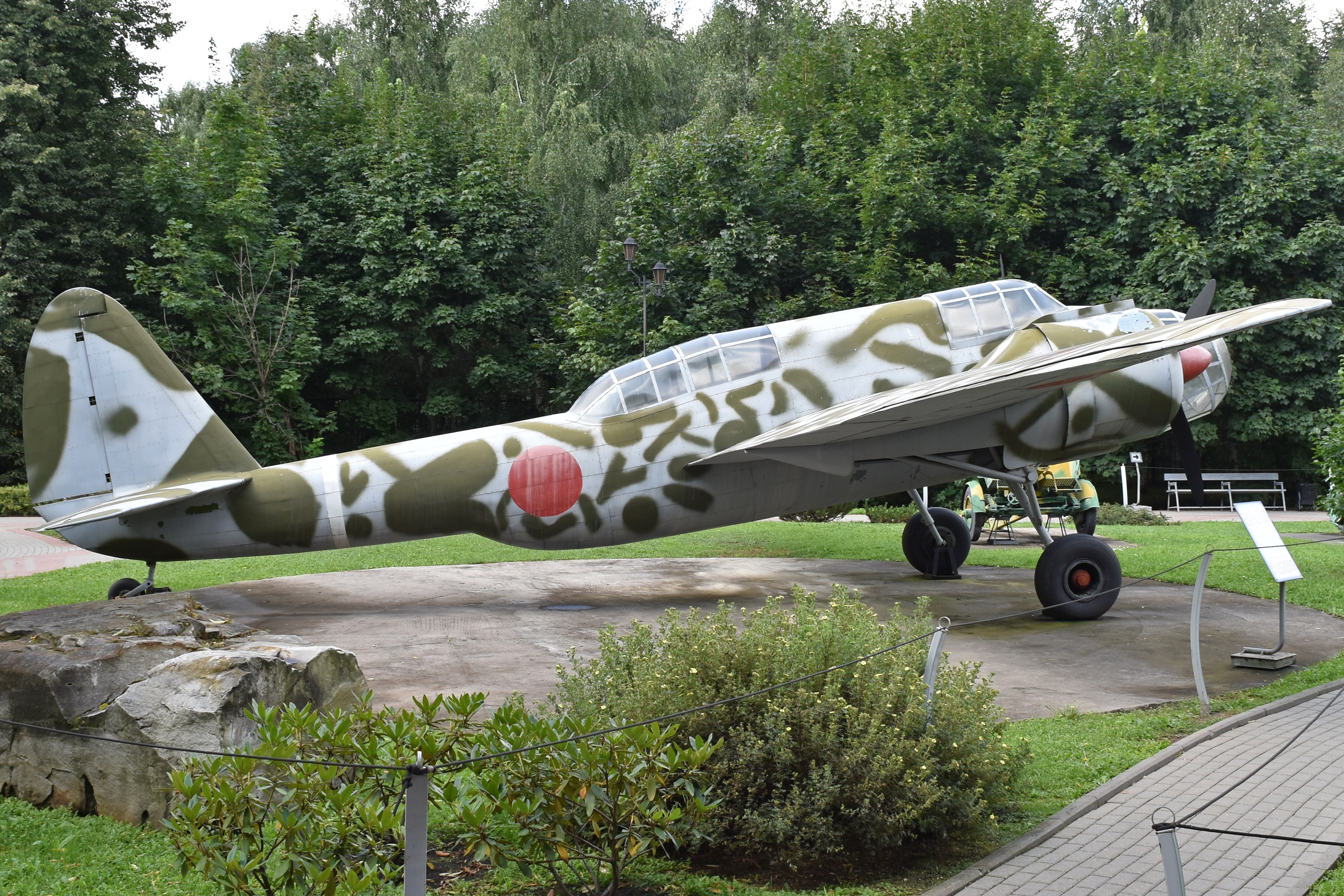
Kawasaki Ki-48 on display in ‘Victory Park’, Museum of the Great Patriotic War, Poklonnaya Hill, Moscow, Russia.

There is a Ki-48 on display at the Museum of the Great Patriotic War, Moscow. The China Aviation Museum in Datangshan has a Kawasaki Ki-48 in Chinese Liberation Army Air Force colours. Some of the parts of the airplane are reproduced. The Indonesian Air Force Museum in Yogyakarta is also known to have a Ki-48 in its collection.

== Specifications (Ki-48-IIa) ==
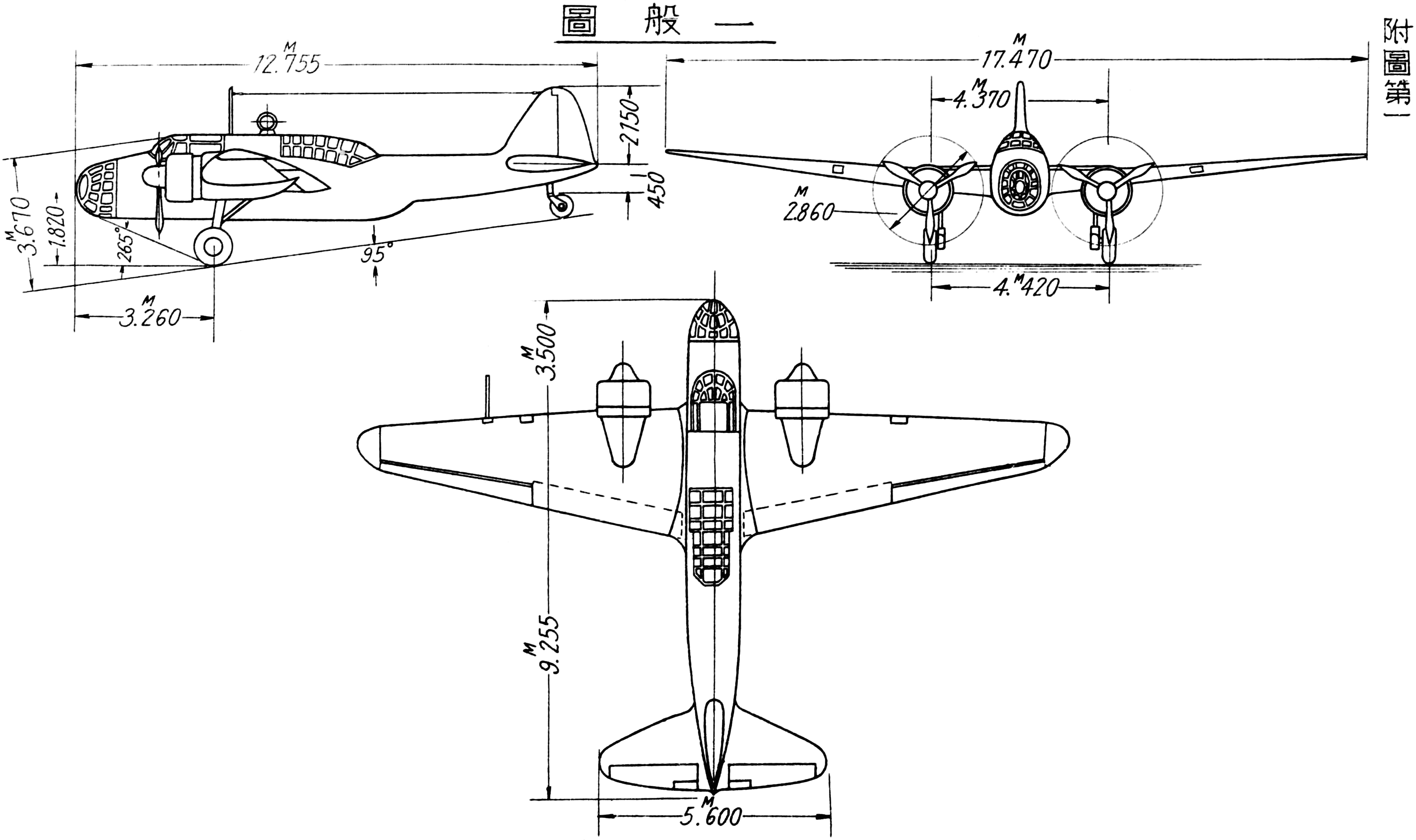
3-view drawing of the Kawasaki Ki-48

Data from Encyclopedia of Military Aircraft, Japanese Aircraft of the Pacific War, and Kawasaki Ki.48-I/II Sokei in Japanese Army Air Force-CNAF & IPSF Service, Aircam No.32

General characteristics

- Crew: 4
- Length: 12.75 m (41 ft 10 in)
- Wingspan: 17.45 m (57 ft 3 in)
- Height: 3.8 m (12 ft 6 in)
- Wing area: 40 m^{2} (430 sq ft)
- Empty weight: 4,550 kg (10,031 lb)
- Gross weight: 6,500 kg (14,330 lb)
- Max takeoff weight: 6,750 kg (14,881 lb)
- Powerplant: 2 × Nakajima Ha115 14-cylinder air-cooled radial piston engines, 843 kW (1,130 hp) each
- Propellers: 3-bladed variable-pitch propellers

Performance

- Maximum speed: 505 km/h (314 mph, 273 kn) at 5,600 m (18,400 ft)
- Range: 2,400 km (1,500 mi, 1,300 nmi)
- Service ceiling: 10,100 m (33,100 ft)

Armament

- Guns: 3 × 7.7 mm (0.303 in) Type 89 machine guns, in nose, dorsal and ventral positions
- Bombs: 800 kg (1,764 lb) of bombs

== See also ==
Aircraft of comparable role, configuration, and era

- Bristol Beaufort
- Bristol Blenheim
- Dornier Do 17
- Douglas A-20 Havoc
- Lockheed Hudson
- Martin Maryland

Related lists

- List of aircraft of Japan during World War II
- List of aircraft of World War II
- List of bomber aircraft
- List of military aircraft of Japan

== Bibliography ==
- Bueschel, Richard M. (1972). Kawasaki Ki. 48-I/II Sokei : in Japanese Army Air Force, CNAF & IPSF service. Richard Ward. Reading: Osprey. ISBN 0-85045-133-7. OCLC 1083005847.
- Francillon, René J. (1987) [1979]. Japanese aircraft of the Pacific War (2nd ed.). London: Putnam Aeronautical Books. ISBN 0-85177-801-1. OCLC 6124909.
- Green, William & Swanborough, Gordon (n.d.). "Pentagon Over the Islands: The Thirty-Year History of Indonesian Military Aviation". Air Enthusiast Quarterly (2): 154–162. ISSN 0143-5450.
- Jackson, Robert (2002). The Encyclopedia of Military Aircraft. London: Parragon. ISBN 0-7525-8130-9.
- Millot, Bernard (November 1977). "Kawasaki Type 99 Ki.48 "Lily" (1)" [Kawasaki Type 99 Ki.48 "Lily" Part One]. Le Fana de l'Aviation (in French) (96): 20–25. ISSN 0757-4169.
- Millot, Bernard (December 1977). "Kawasaki Type 99 Ki.48 "Lily" (2)" [Kawasaki Type 99 Ki.48 "Lily" Part Two]. Le Fana de l'Aviation (in French) (97): 31–35. ISSN 0757-4169.
