= MX designations =

The MX Designation System was introduced by the Experimental Engineering Section of the US Army Air Corps Material Division in 1941.

== Overview ==
MX designations were used for experimental weapon system programs, including jet- and rocket-powered systems, precision-guided munitions, fire-control systems, and other systems designed and manufactured by U.S. defense contractors under contracts provided by the U.S. Army Air Corps from 1941, the United States Army Air Force (1945–1947), and the United States Air Force (1947–1954). Some MX designated programs were also pursued by United States Navy. For example MX-554 led both to the Army JB-2 as well as the Navy KGW.

The "MX" indexation system was in use until 1 July 1954, but certain weapon programs are referred to by their "MX" designations in some technical literature for convenience, such as the SM-65 Atlas (MX-1593).
