= Nikitin PSN-2 =

PSN-2

General information
- Type: Research aircraft
- National origin: USSR
- Manufacturer: Nikitin
- Designer: M.M. Yefimo
- Number built: 1

History
- First flight: June 1940

The Nikitin PSN-2, (Planer Spetsial'nogo Naznachenaya - glider for special purpose) was a single seat glider bomb research aircraft designed and produced in the USSR from 1934.

== Development ==
The PSN-2 was a glider floatplane designed to test the concept and guidance equipment for a range of guided glider bombs proposed by S.F. Valk in 1933. Constructed of wood, the PSN-2 was a sleek monoplane aircraft with two floats attached to the wing with struts, an open cockpit in the extreme nose of the fuselage and extra fins at the aft end of each float. The PSN-2 could be carried aloft under a mother-ship or aero-towed off water. Beaching gear was available for manoeuvring the aircraft when not on the water. The planned mission of the pilotless production version of PSN-2 included a 40 km(25.85 mile) range flown at 700 km/h(435 mph), guided to the target with the KVANT Infra-red guidance system. Flight testing was carried out in 1940, but work was discontinued on 19 July 1940.

== Specifications (PSN-2) ==
Data from Encyclopaedia of Russian Aircraft 1875-1995

General characteristics

- Crew: 1
- Length: 7.98 m (26 ft 2.2 in)
- Wingspan: 7.0 m (22 ft 11.6 in)

Performance

== See also ==
- Fieseler Fi103
- RAE LARYNX
