= Nikitin PSN-1 =

PSN-1

General information
- Type: Research aircraft
- National origin: USSR
- Designer: Vasilii Vasilyevich Nikitin & N.G. Mikhelson
- Number built: 10

The Nikitin PSN-1 was a piloted glider anti-shipping missile produced in the USSR from 1937.

== Development ==
From 1933 a series of special projects was initiated under the PSN banner (Planer Spetsial'nogo Naznachenaya - Glider for Special Purposes). A proposal was made by S.F. Valk for a glider anti-shipping bomb with Infra-Red guidance, which was expanded to include DPT (long-range glider torpedo), LTDD (Long-range flying torpedo) and BMP (towed mine glider). To evaluate the Kvant Infra-Red guidance a piloted version was produced as the Nikitin PSN-1. Nikitin and Mikhelson designed a small single-seat monoplane flying boat glider with floats at approx 1/2 span, carrying a torpedo underneath. The PSN-1 was carried aloft by either Tupolev TB-3 or Tupolev TB-7 motherships and released at the appropriate height.

At least 10 were built and many of these were flown during trials of the autopilot and the Kvant (Quantum) guidance system.

== Specifications (PSN-1) ==
Data from Encyclopedia of Russian Aircraft 1875-1995

General characteristics

- Crew: 1
- Wingspan: 18 m (26 ft 3 in)
- Empty weight: 970 kg (2,138 lb)
- Gross weight: 2,000 kg (4,409 lb)
- Powerplant: 1 × MG-11F

Performance

- Maximum speed: 168 km/h (104 mph, 90 kn)

== See also ==
Aircraft of comparable role, configuration, and era

- Fieseler Fi 103
- RAE Larynx
- Henschel Hs 293

Related lists

- List of gliders
