= Azon =

American guided bomb

AZON
- AZON, the first guided bomb developed by the United States.
- Type: Guided bomb
- Place of origin: United States

Service history
- In service: 1944
- Used by: United States
- Wars: World War II

Specifications
- Mass: VB-1: 1,000 pounds (450 kg); VB-2: 2,000 pounds (910 kg)
- Operational range: 5,000 feet (1,500 m)
- Guidance system: MCLOS radio control system

AZON (or Azon), from "azimuth only", was one of the world's first guided weapons, deployed by the Allies and contemporary with the German Fritz X.

Officially designated VB-1 ("Vertical Bomb 1"), it was invented by Major Henry J. Rand and Thomas J. O'Donnell during the latter stages of World War II as the answer to the difficult problem of destroying the narrow wooden bridges that supported much of the Burma Railway.

AZON was essentially a 1,000 lb (454 kg) general-purpose AN-M65 bomb with a quadrilateral 4-fin style radio controlled tail fin design as part of a "tail package" to give the desired guidance capability, allowing adjustment of the vertical trajectory in the yaw axis, giving the Azon unit a lateral steering capability (meaning it could only steer left and right, and could not alter its pitch or rate of fall). This lack of any pitch control meant that the bombardier still had to accurately release it with a bombsight to ensure it could not fall short of or beyond the target. The "tail package" bolted onto the standard bomb warhead, in place of the usual sheet-metal fixed fins; this concept was an early iteration of a now common method of making modern guided bombs (such as the JDAM, the Paveway family, etc.): making the guidance and control units as separate pieces that attach to the tail and/or nose of a standard "iron bomb", making it into a guided weapon. There were gyroscopes mounted in the bomb's added tail package that made it an Azon unit, to autonomously stabilize it in the roll axis via operating a pair of ailerons, and a radio control system to operate the proportional-control rudders, to directly control the bomb's direction of lateral aim, with the antennas for the tail-mounted receiver unit built into the diagonal support struts of the tail surface assembly. The bomb's receiver and control system were powered by a battery which had around three minutes of battery life. The entire setup in the added "tail package" was sufficient to guide the weapon from a 5,000-foot (1,500 m) drop height to the target. Situated on the tail of the bomb was a 600,000-candela flare which also left behind a noticeable smoke trail, to enable the bombardier to observe and control it from the control aircraft. When used in combat, it was dropped from a modified Consolidated B-24 Liberator, with earlier development test drops of the Azon in the United States sometimes using the B-17 Flying Fortress as the platform. Some ten crews, of the 458th Bombardment Group, based at RAF Horsham St Faith, were trained to drop the device for use in the European theater.

The ability to only control the path of the bomb in the azimuth direction, made AZON bombs most suitable for long and narrow targets, such as bridges or railways. A disadvantage of using an AZON bomb was that after a bomb was dropped the bomber could not break away immediately, because the bombardier had to keep the bomb in view so he could guide it. The bombardier used a BC-1156 joystick control to adjust the course left or right. The directional commands were sent to the guidance package via a special-purpose radio system.

The 493rd Bomb Squadron also dropped Azon bombs in Burma in early 1945 from similarly modified B-24s, based at Pandaveswar Airfield, India, with considerable success, fulfilling the designers' original purpose for the ordnance.

== Azon operations ==
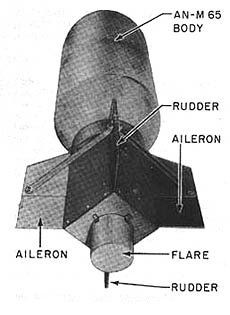
Components of Azon

Azon Operations in Europe by the Eighth Air Force, June–September 1944
Target	Date	Result
Melun	8 June 1944	Mission 400: an attack on the Melun bridge by an Azon unit is foiled by clouds.
Ham-sur-Somme	14 June 1944	Mission 412: 7 of 15 B-24s hit the bridge over the Somme at Ham and 5 use Azon bombs against targets of opportunity; no losses.
Étaples	15 June 1944	Mission 414: 12 B-24s use Azon bombs against Étaples railroad bridge and 7 others use the bombs against the Pecrone railroad bridge.
Saumur	22 June 1944	Mission 432: 9 of 10 B-24s use Azon bombs against the Saumur Bridge.
Esternay	17 August 1944	Mission 558: 10 B-24s are dispatched to drop Azon bombs on the Les Foulons rail bridge near Esternay but the mission is abandoned due to deteriorating weather.
Moerdijk	25 August 1944	Mission 571: 10 of 10 B-24s fly an Azon bomb mission to attack railroad bridge at Moerdijk, Netherlands but the target is missed by all 40 bombs launched.
Moerdijk	26 August 1944	Mission 577: a second attempt on the Moerdijk rail bridge is made with 9 aircraft, but clouds prevent an attack.
Ravenstein	1 September 1944	Mission 597: 12 of 12 Azon-equipped B-24s hit the Ravenstein rail bridge in the Netherlands, without loss.
Hemmingstedt & Kropp	13 September 1944	Mission 629: 6 of 11 B-24s dispatched on an Azon mission attacked the Hemmingstedt oil refinery and 5 hit the secondary target, ammunition dumps at Kropp. Operation Aphrodite guided bombs also attacked Hemmingstedt the next day.

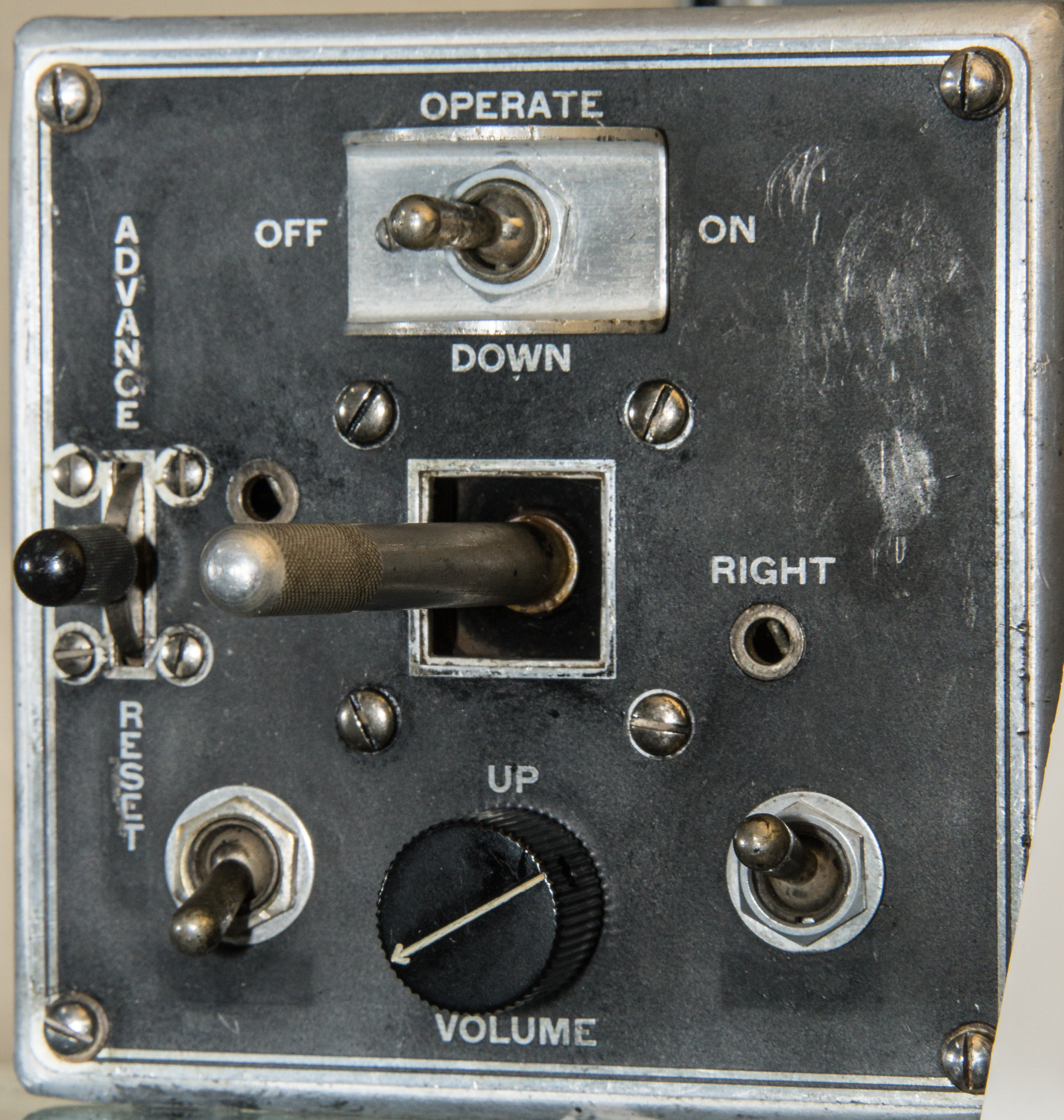
The bombardier used the joystick on the BC-1156 control lever to adjust the direction of the bomb to the left or right.

== See also ==
- Bat (U.S. Navy autonomously radar-guided bomb)
- Fritz X
- GB-8
- Kehl-Strasbourg radio control link, for MCLOS control of WW II German PGM ordnance
- List of anti-ship missiles
