= Kawasaki Ki-148 =

Ki-148 I-Gō Model 1 Otsu
- Type: Guided air-to-surface missile
- Place of origin: Japan

Production history
- Manufacturer: Kawasaki Kōkūki Kōgyō K.K.
- Produced: 1944-1945
- No. built: ~180

Specifications
- Mass: 680 kg (1,500 lb)
- Length: 4.09 m (13 ft 5 in)
- Wingspan: 2.6 m (8 ft 6 in) / Wing area: 1.95 m^{2} (21 sq ft)
- Effective firing range: 11 km (6.8 miles)
- Warhead: Shaped charge
- Warhead weight: 300 kg (661 lb)
- Propellant: 1 x 1.47 kN (330 lb_{f}) thrust Toku-Ro Mark 1 Model 2 rocket
- Maximum speed: 550 km/h (340 mph)
- Guidance system: radio-control
- Launch platform: Kawasaki Ki-102 in service (Kawasaki Ki-48 for trials)
- References: Japanese Aircraft of the Pacific War

The Kawasaki I-Gō Model 1 Otsu (No.1 Model 1B), otherwise known as Ki-148 was a World War II Japanese guided air-to-surface missile designed in 1944. Developed alongside its sister project the Mitsubishi I-Gō Model 1 Kō and the later Tokyo Imperial University designed I-Gō Model 1 Hei, the Ki-148 was a simple radio-controlled guided missile propelled by a liquid rocket engine generating 1.47 kN (330 lbf) of thrust for up to 80 seconds. Compared to the Ki-147, the Ki-148 was physically smaller and carried a 300 kg warhead versus the 800 kg warhead of the Ki-147.

Test trials were carried out in late 1944 and the weapon was quickly ordered by the war ministry. Launched during tests from a modified Kawasaki Ki-48 light bomber, its standard mother aircraft was to be the modern Kawasaki Ki-102 attack aircraft. Although approximately 180 missiles were built, none saw service before the end of World War II.
