= GB-1 =

U.S. World War II glide bomb

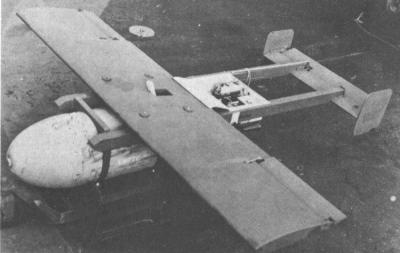
- Type: Glide bomb
- Place of origin: United States

Service history
- In service: 1943–1945
- Used by: United States Army Air Forces

Production history
- Designed: 1941–1943
- Manufacturer: Aeronca Aircraft

Specifications
- Wingspan: 12 feet (3.7 m)
- Warhead: 2,000 lb (910 kg) M34 GP bomb
- Operational range: 20 miles (32 km)
- Maximum speed: 230 miles per hour (370 km/h)
- Guidance system: Preset azimuth
- Launch platform: B-17 Flying Fortress

As the incipient ability to create guided weapons which might be used to make stand-off attacks from the air was considered by the US Army Air Forces. These weapons were considered more likely to soon become operational than the General Motors A-1 (GMA-1, Bug) powered guided bomb. The Glide Bomb (GB) serise could be launched from bombers from outside antiaircraft fire and be guided to hit targets at a shallow angle increasing the probability of damage. From 1941 to January 1946 the program to develop the GB-1 and its many developments existed.

The GB-1, also known as the "Grapefruit bomb" and as XM-108, was a glide bomb produced by Aeronca Aircraft for the United States Army Air Forces during World War II. Intended to allow bombers to release bombs from outside the range of enemy defenses, over one thousand GB-1s were used in combat before the end of the war.

== Design and development ==
The U.S. Army Air Corps – which would later become the U.S. Army Air Forces – initiated development of a glide bomb design in March 1941. Intended to allow bombers to stand off outside the range of enemy flak while releasing their bombload, while also potentially allowing for more precise targeting due to the shallow glide path the bomb would follow, the design resulted in three prototypes; one developed by Aeronca designated GB-1; a design by Bellanca designated GB-2, the Timm Aircraft-designed GB-3, and the Wright Field Equipment Laboratory GB-4.

The GB-1 mated a 12-foot (3.7 m) wing and twin-tail empennage of conventional small-aircraft design to a standard M34 2,000-pound (910 kg) bomb. A gyrostabilizer-based autopilot controlling azimuth was used, allowing the bomb to be set to a specific course following release at a specific altitude and target distance; gliding at a speed of 230 miles per hour (370 km/h), range from a release height of 15,000 feet (4,600 m) was 20 miles (32 km).

== Operational history ==
Selected for production over the competing GB-2 and GB-3 due to its simpler control system and its proving more practical for bomber carriage, production of the GB-1 began in May 1943; arriving in the combat zone in September, operational use was delayed due to the limited bombload the glider imposed – a B-17 Flying Fortress bomber could carry only two GB-1s on a mission, one on a rack under each of the bomber's wings – and the accuracy of the GB-1 proving to be significantly worse than that of ordinary bombs. Despite this, by May 1944 the first releases of GB-1s were undertaken. On 28 May 1944, 42 of 113 glide bombs released hit Cologne, after being released 18 miles from the Eifeltor marshaling yard in the city at 195 miles per hour (314 km/h); many failed to hold an electrical charge in their batteries, causing their autopilots to fail. German gunners mistook the bombs for aircraft they were shooting down, claiming over 90 kills. Due to the inaccuracy the bombs demonstrated, the Eighth Air Force did not use the glide bombs again; however other units would go on to use over a thousand GB-1s before the end of the war.

== Development of GB-1-based devices ==
During the war, variants of the GB-1, a self stabilized device without any additional capabilities was adapted for a panalopy of active and passive guidance systems. These systems appeared under one or more names and even under radically different designations. For this reason they sometimes had different MX designations.

using a contrast seeker for anti-shipping use GB-5 (MX-611) Originall, This was also known as GB-5A with a Fairchild photo-electric seeker There were also the GB-5B with a Hammond flare seeker.

GB-6 (MX-612) used an Offner heat sensor attached to a GB-8 airframe. GB-6 development languished even after transfer to Wendover Utah for a better climate. One hundred and fifty GB-6 were expended before development was halted inFebruary 1945. semi-active radar homing

GB-7 (MX-613) originally GB-7A which used semi-active radar homing. radio command guidance. The GB-5B (MX-616) which ultimately became GB-GB-14 wwhich had a radar send-receive guidance. The GB-7C was under research at the end of the war. The goal of the GB-7C to build a weapon capable of being used to destroy enemy radars did not become operationally available until the Vietnam War.

GB-8 (MX-645), was a radio controlled waepon. GB-8 had several limitations. It was difficult to track, GB-8 required 5 radio channels to achieve it's mission limiting the number of bombs that could be deploed at the same time. A flare carrying GB-8 was developed. A number of flare dispensing GB-8 could illuminate an area three miles long. Though GB-8s were sent to Europe the daylight bombing which was standard 8th Air Force policy had no use for illumiination. An anti-personnel version was developed which dispensed anti-personnel bomblets, development of the GB-8 ended September 1945.

GB-9 (MX494) was intended to use either a radio-baromiter or an anaroid one The device was intended to be dropped from a diving aircraft, descend to an altitude of 1,000 feet and then be guided by the operator until making a dive into the target. The GB-9 projrct began in January 1944 and ended in late 1945.

GB-10 was a television guided bomb onwhich a flare allowed tracking from above, not below. The GB-10 was little developed and terminated at the end of the war,

GB-11 (MX-614) was a chemical delivery system in which the 2,000 lb. bomb was replaced with M33A smoke tank. The GB-11 was little developed and cancelled with the end of the war.

GB-12 (MX-615) originally GB-5C. The GB-12 was hampered by an inability to deal with a mixed cloud situation. GB-12 was reasonably successful with either clear skies or a consistent layer of clouds. It failed whan broken clouds were present. The use of GB-12 was also considered as an air-to-air weapon. Five of 25 built were tested at Tonopah in May 1944 before the GB-12 was abandoned. heat seeking

GB-13 (MX-619) originally GB-5D, was a flair seeking weapon. It had a nose fairing with a Fairchild B-3 photocell which had a 70 degree homing cone. The GB-13 was intended for use as a skip-bomb which would be dreopped by a low flying aircraft with intent for it to skip off the ground and slide into the target. Testing of the GB-13 ended in late spring of 1945.

GB-15 (MX-717) was a Radar/TV seeking bomb which was rejectted by the 20th Air Force and effctivly cancelled in February 1945 though official cancellation did not occur until March 1946.

The GT-1 torpedo-delivering glider was also derived from the GB-1. The design and development of the GT-1 began in March 1941. It was imediatly the subject of an interservice imbroglio betwen the Army Air Force and US Navy, A status quo was achieved with a GB-1 variant delivering a Mk. 13, Mod 2 homing torpedo. The Army Glide Torpedo would deliver the U.S.N. homing torpedo close enough for its homing guidance to work. Interservice delays kept the GT-1 from advancing especially as neither service felt the weapon would be effective against any but stationary targets. Problems arose with the angle the torpedo entered the water.> That problem was solved by trailing a paravane which dettected the precise moment t release the torpedo. In early April 1944 18 B-25J aircraft were modified to deliver the GT-1. Both the 5th and 7th Air Forces determined the GT-1 was undesirable. An assortment of AAF powers kept the program alive, resulting in the formation of the 1st Provisionaal Glide Torpedo Squadron. The Mk.13 torpedos were programed to circle in increasing then decreasing diameters. The First Guided Torpedo Squadron was stationed in Okenawa. The few combat missions produced arguable results. The atom bomb brough a quick end to the war and both the GB-1 and GT-1 programs.

Production of the GB-1 was terminated in January 1945; following the end of the war, the bomb was taken out of service. Development of some GB-1 derivatives continued through January 1946. The GB-1 had proven incompatible with Army Air Force doctrin of massive daylight attack The Glide Bombs were assigned very low priority.
