= Feuerlilie =

German missile

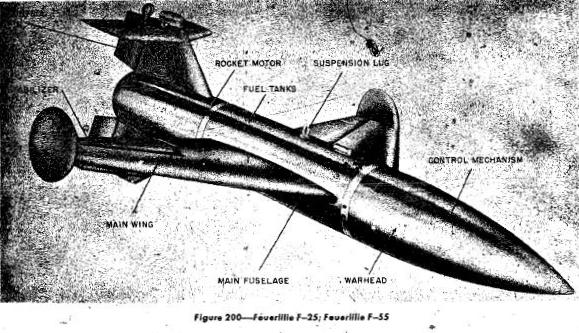
German feuerlilie anti-aircraft missile

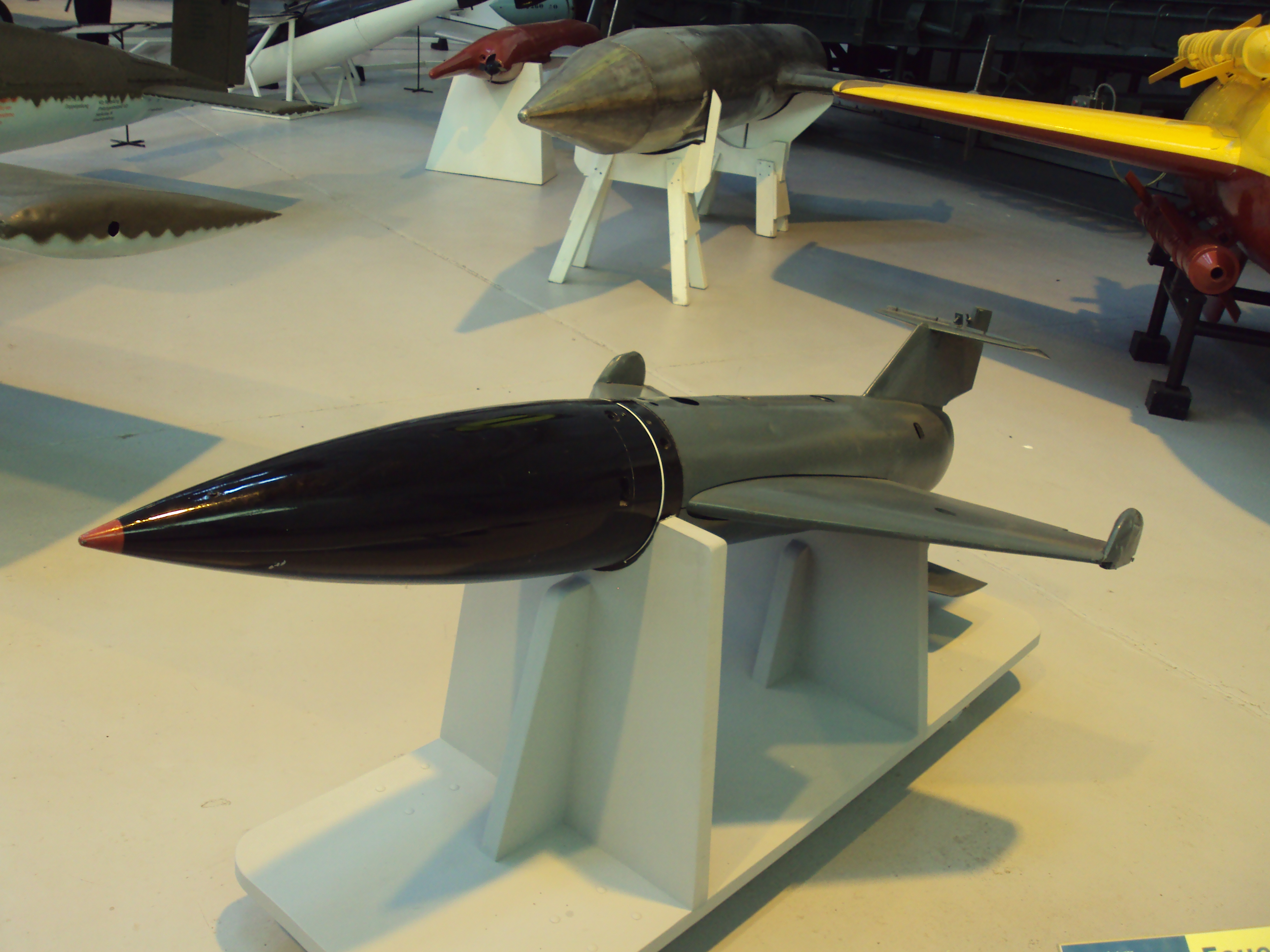
German Feuerlilie at Royal Air Force Museum Midlands

Feuerlilie (English: fire lily) was the code name of a German anti-aircraft missile, which was developed in 1940 and was shelved because of problems with the controller and the drive section at the end of January 1945 in favour of other projects. The Feuerlilie was built and tested at Rheinmetall-Borsig in two versions: the F-25 with a diameter of 25 cm, and the larger F-55 55 cm in diameter. The engines were Rheinmetall 109-505/515 solid rockets.

== Feuerlilie F-25 ==
In 1940 Hermann Goering's German Aviation Research organisation (Deutsche Forschungsanstalt für Luftfahrt - DFL) began to design a remote-controlled rocket under the code name Fire Lily to research the construction of anti-aircraft missiles.

The first model, the Feuerlilie (4.4 F) was a scaled-down version created in the short term to get an impression of the later flight behaviour of the new weapon. The intention of the Air Ministry (RLM) was to test 25 F 25s, in cooperation with the Deutsche Forschungsanstalt für Segelflug (DFS) and the Reichspost-Forschungsamt (RPF). In practice this took place, but only some time later.

The development of the remote control system was at an advanced stage in February 1943, with research in the wind-tunnel and the construction of a gun rack almost complete. The production of the first F-25 pre-series included 24 specimens made unexpectedly good progress and by July 1943 it was possible to make further F-25s ready. The work, however, faltered due to lack of motors. The first F-25 in the July 1943 was tested in the Leba proving ground on the Baltic Sea. By mid 1944 at least four F-25s had been fired. However, the test results did not meet expectations and so the development of the F-25 was still set before end of 1944.

== Feuerlilie F-55 ==
With the completion of the development of the F-25, the main interest in the LFA focused on the F-55. This was a remote-controlled 2-stage supersonic missile (first stage: solid and level flight: liquid). Launching the device was made from an oblique ramp, later also on a modified 88-mm anti-aircraft gun launch pad. The first production of the F-55 was completed in April 1942.

On 25 January 1943 a contract was sent to the Ardelt company in Breslau for the construction of five test samples. The construction of the units was completed in February 1943. On 9 March there was a delay to the delivery of the batch, now 30 units, due to technical problems, including with the controller and the drive section.

The first launch of an F-55A1 was on 12 May 1944. It flew for 69 seconds and a distance of 7500 m. From 19 October 1944 at Greifswalder Oie three further launches of the F-55A2, which demonstrated their unstable flight behaviour. The launch of the improved F-55A3 was aborted on 21 October 1944 because of technical problems.

On 22 November 1944 the Technical Department of the Air Ministry cut the number of F-55s from 25 to 11 devices. There was a further cut in December 1944 to 20 sample units of the A2 and A3 models. The last documented attempt to fly an F-55A2 took place on 11 December 1944 at Greifswalder Oie.

To accelerate the development and to obtain reliable results, on 14 January 1945 it was decided to use the unmodified drive from the Henschel Hs 293 in the F-55 A2 and A3. The F-55 would have a larger tail for greater flight stability. As the development was discontinued in late January 1945 these changes were scrapped.

== Technical data ==
- Length:

F-25 to 1896 mm

F-55 to 4800 mm

- Diameter:

F-25 - 250 mm

F-55 - 550 mm

- Span

F-25 to 1500 mm

F-55 - 4500 mm

- Vmax:

F-25 - 840 km / h

F-55 - 1260 km / h

- Nominal height:

F-25 - not known

F-55 - 10,000 m

- Weight:

F-25 - not known

F-55 - 600 kg with a payload of 100

== See also ==
- Henschel Hs 117
- Taifun
- Rheintochter
- Wasserfall

== Literature ==
- Manfred Griehl: Luftwaffe '45 Letzte Flüge und Projekte, Motorbuch Verlag, ISBN 3-613-02474-8
