= Royal Air Force Museum Midlands =

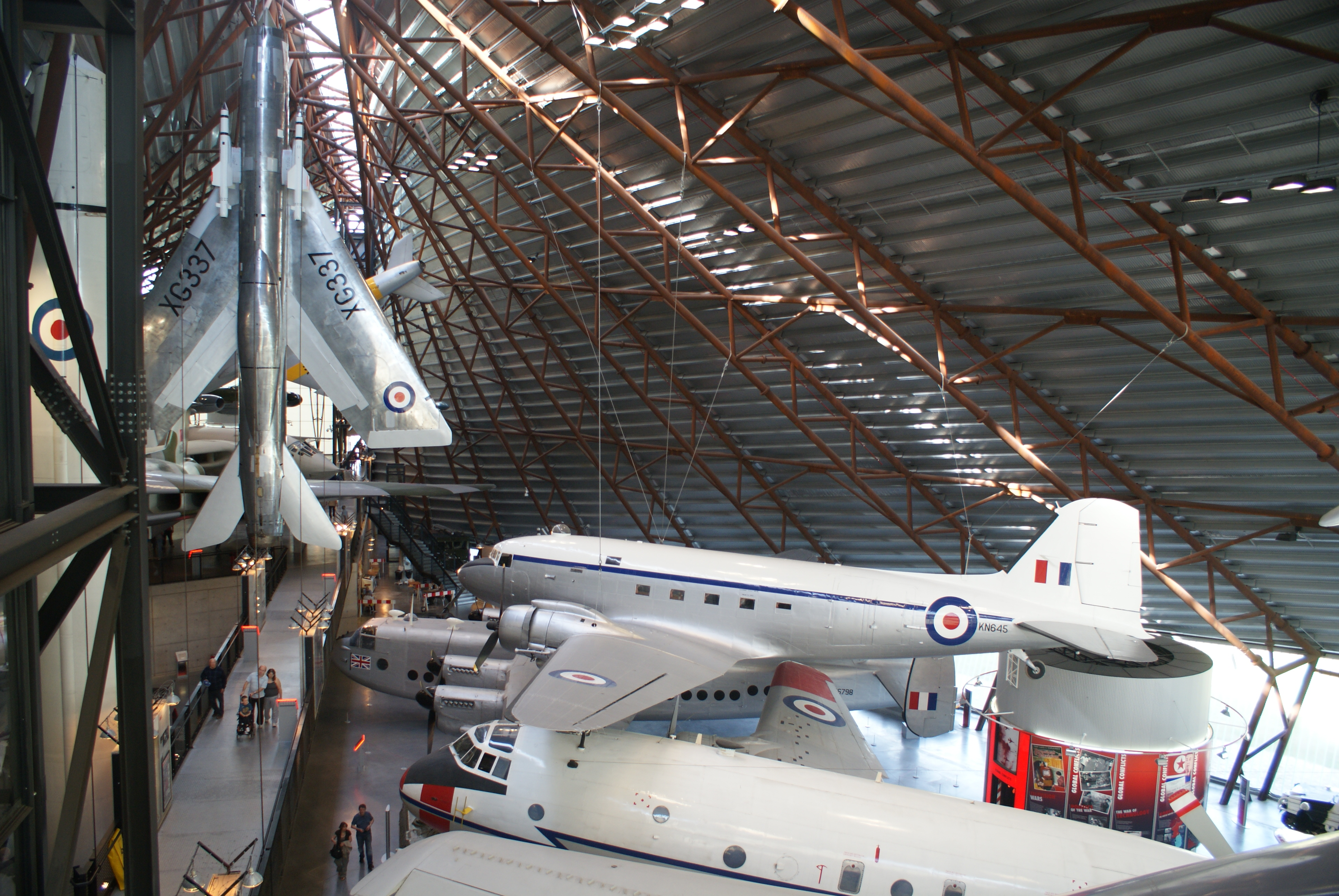

- Location within Shropshire
- Former name: Royal Air Force Museum Cosford
- Established: 1 May 1979
- Location: RAF Cosford, Shropshire
- Coordinates: 52.644°N 2.3115°W
- Type: Aviation museum
- Visitors: 351,304 (2025)
- Website: www.rafmuseum.org.uk

The Royal Air Force Museum Midlands, located at RAF Cosford in Shropshire, is a free museum dedicated to the history of aviation and the Royal Air Force in particular. The museum is part of the Royal Air Force Museum, a non-departmental public body sponsored by the Ministry of Defence and also a registered charity. The museum is spread over two sites in England; the other site is at the Royal Air Force Museum London at Colindale (near Hendon) in north London.

== History ==
The London museum was officially opened at the Colindale (then part of Hendon) London site on 15 November 1972 by Queen Elizabeth II. The hangars housed just 36 aircraft at opening. Over the years, the collection increased and aircraft were stored at RAF stations around the country when they were not on display to the public.

On 1 May 1979, the Cosford site was opened at RAF Cosford, one of the RAF stations which had been used to store the museum's collection of aircraft. On opening, the museum initially exhibited airframes which had been used for technical training at RAF Cosford. In the following years additional aircraft were added to the collection, and in 1980 it was agreed that the British Airways Collection be displayed at Cosford. On 21 June 1998 four additional galleries were opened, housing art, temporary exhibitions and other aviation subjects. 13 May 2002 saw the relocation of the RAF Museum Conservation Centre from Cardington, Bedfordshire to Cosford. The centre, costing £2.4 million, was opened by Marshal of the Royal Air Force Sir Michael Beetham.

In its early years, it was named The Aerospace Museum. In 1998 the name was changed to RAF Museum Cosford, and in March 2022 it was renamed RAF Museum Midlands.

The Cosford site includes several developmental aircraft such as those that led to the English Electric Lightning and the second prototype of the BAC TSR-2. Several of the aircraft are very rare, such as the only Boulton Paul Defiant, the only Vickers Valiant and one of only two surviving Vickers Wellingtons left in the world.

The first director of the museum was Dr John Tanner who retired in 1987. In 1988 Dr Michael A Fopp (who had previously directed the London Transport Museum) was appointed and was Director General of all three sites covered by the museum until his retirement in 2010.

The site can be reached by public transport via the neighbouring Cosford railway station on the Wolverhampton to Shrewsbury Line.

=== British Airways collection ===
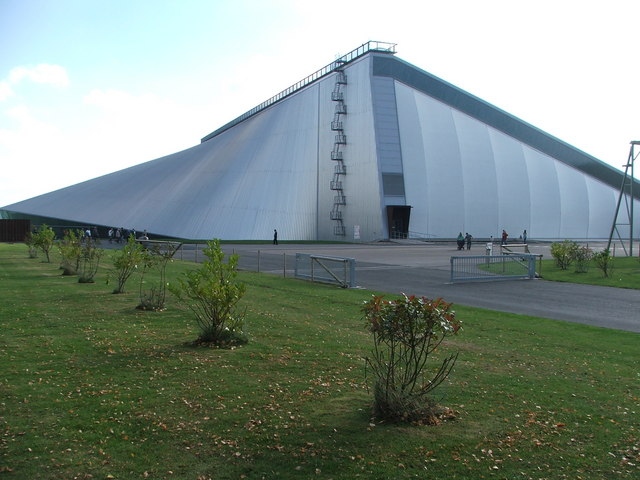
The National Cold War Exhibition

In 1980, the Cosford site agreed to house the British Airways Museum collection. In 2006 British Airways withdrew funding from the collection, after which the RAF Museum did not take on the costs of maintaining the aircraft. Several of the jet airliners were subsequently broken up, including the only Boeing 707 that was preserved in the UK, a Vickers VC10 and a Hawker Siddeley Trident.

== National Cold War Exhibition ==
The National Cold War Exhibition opened at Cosford in February 2007. The exhibition houses the museum's V bombers and other Cold War aircraft in a newly constructed 8,000m^{2} exhibition building designed by architects Fielden Clegg Bradley. The exhibition concept and design was developed by Neal Potter and includes 'silo theatres' which depict, in a variety of media, the key tensions of the Cold War period.

== Aircraft on display ==
The RAF Museum's Hunter T.7, serial number XL568, was operated by No. 74 Squadron RAF, then No. 237 Operational Conversion Unit RAF, and later by 208 and 12 Squadrons before being retired to ground instructional duties at RAF Cranwell and then to the museum at RAF Cosford. Another Hunter, F.6A XG225, now a gate guard at the Museum entrance, was initially with No. 92 Squadron RAF and later served with the Weapons Squadron (part of the School of Technical Training) at Cosford.

== Engines on display ==
The Cosford museum houses a large collection of aero engines; the majority are located in Hangar 1, and a small side room of this hangar contains a display of rocket engines.

- Alvis Leonides
- Armstrong Siddeley Cheetah XV
- Armstrong Siddeley Civet
- Armstrong Siddeley Mamba
- Armstrong Siddeley Stentor
- Bentley BR2
- Blackburn Cirrus Major
- Bristol Thor
- Bristol Siddeley 605
- Bristol Stentor
- Daimler-Benz DB 610
- de Havilland Gipsy
- de Havilland Gipsy Queen
- de Havilland Spectre
- de Havilland Double Spectre
- de Havilland Super Sprite
- General Electric T700
- Junkers Jumo 004
- Junkers Jumo 205
- Lycoming O-360
- Nakajima Sakae
- Napier Lion
- Power Jets W.2
- Pratt & Whitney R-985
- Pratt & Whitney R-1830
- Renault 70 hp
- Rolls-Royce Avon
- Rolls-Royce Dart
- Rolls-Royce Conway
- Rolls-Royce Derwent
- Rolls-Royce Olympus
- Rolls-Royce Viper
- Rolls-Royce Spey
- Rolls-Royce Tyne
- Rolls-Royce RB108
- Rolls-Royce RB162
- Rolls-Royce RB.211
- Rolls-Royce Kestrel XVI
- Packard Merlin 28
- Rolls-Royce/SNECMA M45H
- Rolls-Royce Turbomeca Adour
- Turbo-Union RB199
- Walter 109-500
- Walter 109–509
- Walter 109-739
- Wright R-3350

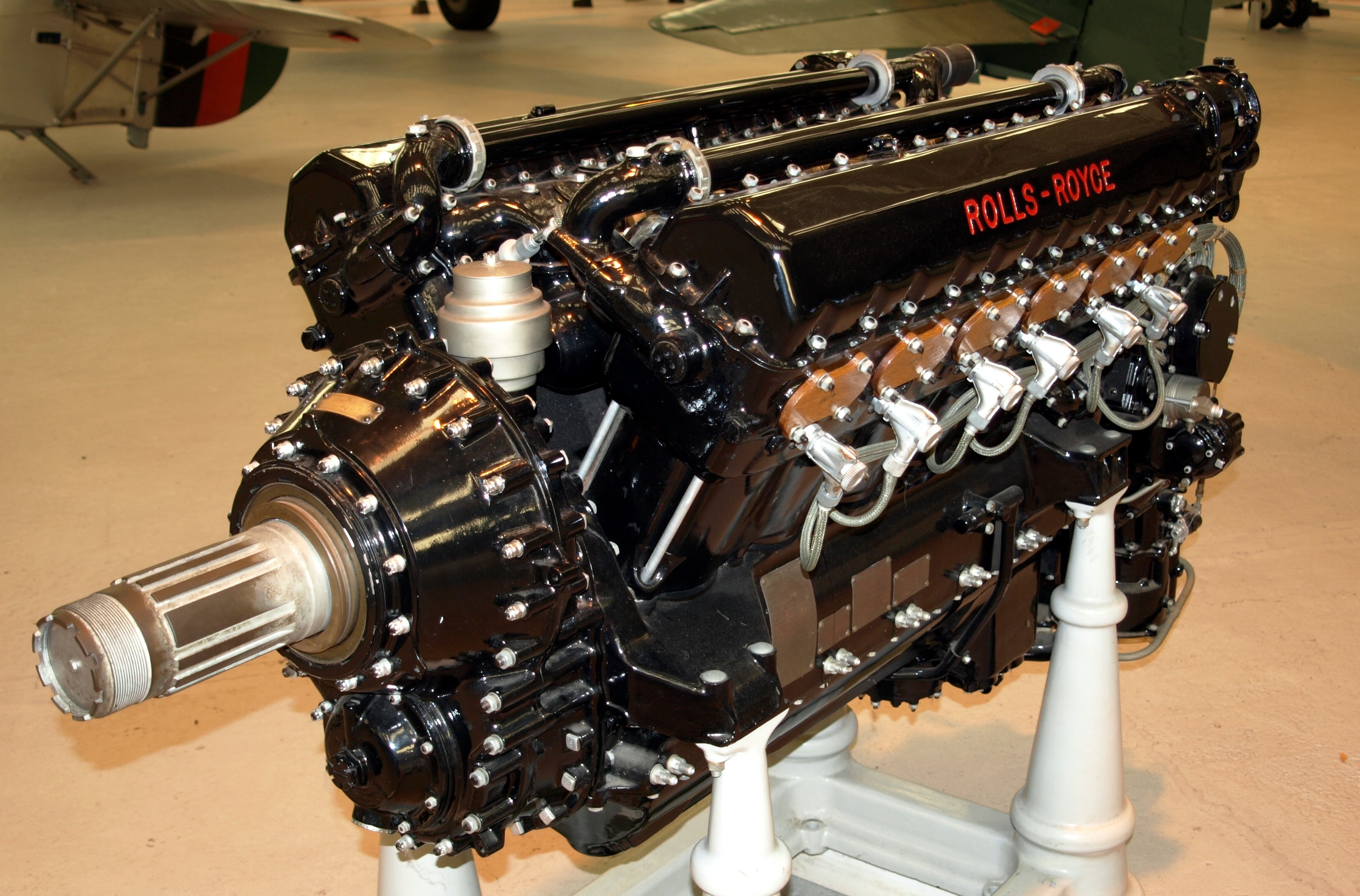
The Rolls-Royce Kestrel on display in the War Planes hangar

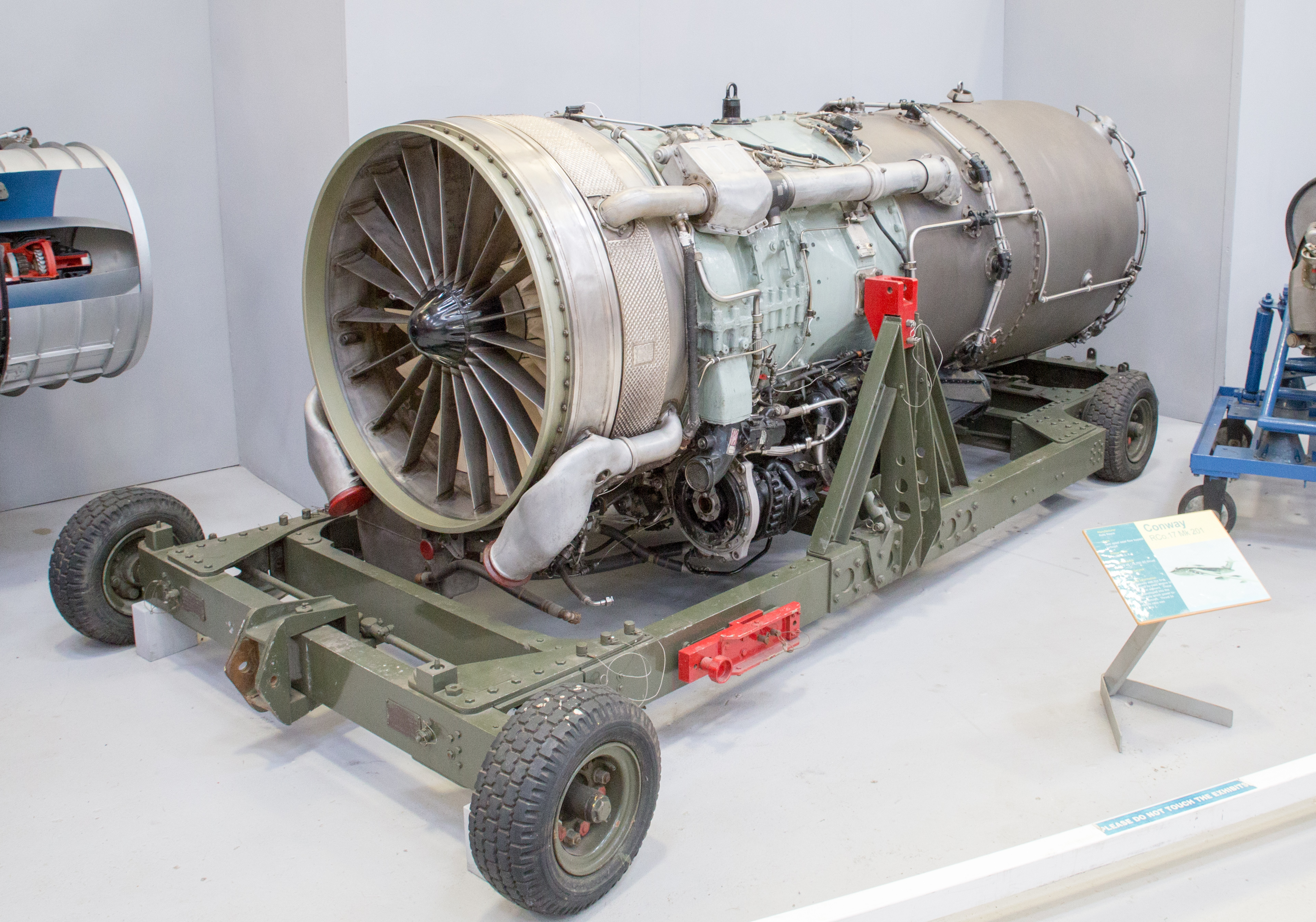
The Rolls-Royce Conway on display in Hangar 1

== Missile collection ==
The museum holds a large collection of missiles and rocket-powered weapons, including several rare German World War II types. The majority are located in the National Cold War Exhibition, with the German collection on display in Hangar 1.

- Australian Government Aircraft Factories Malkara
- Blohm & Voss BV 246
- British Aerospace Rapier
- Hawker Siddeley SRAAM
- British Aircraft Corporation Bloodhound
- British Aerospace Sea Skua
- British Aircraft Corporation Swingfire
- British Aircraft Corporation Thunderbird
- Douglas Thor
- Douglas Skybolt
- Engins Matra AS37 AR Martel
- Fairey Fireflash
- Fairey Separation Test Vehicle
- Fieseler Fi103 (V-1 flying bomb)
- German Army V-2
- Hai Ying 2G Silkworm
- Hawker Siddeley Blue Steel
- Hawker Siddeley Firestreak
- Hawker Siddeley Martel AJ-168
- Hawker Siddeley Red Top
- Henschel Hs 117 'Schmetterling'
- Henschel Hs 293
- Henschel Hs 298
- Holzbrau Enzian
- Lockheed Polaris
- Nord AS11
- Philco-Ford AIM-9B Sidewinder
- RAF Lightweight Torpedo Mk30
- Raytheon AIM-7 Sparrow
- Rheinmetall Borsig Feuerlilie
- Rheinmetall Borsig Rheinbote
- Rheinmetall Borsig Rheintochter
- Ruhrstahl Kramer X-4
- Ruhrstahl AG Fritz X
- Scheufeln Taifun
- USA Lightweight Torpedo Mk43
- USA Lightweight Torpedo Mk44
- Vickers Red Dean

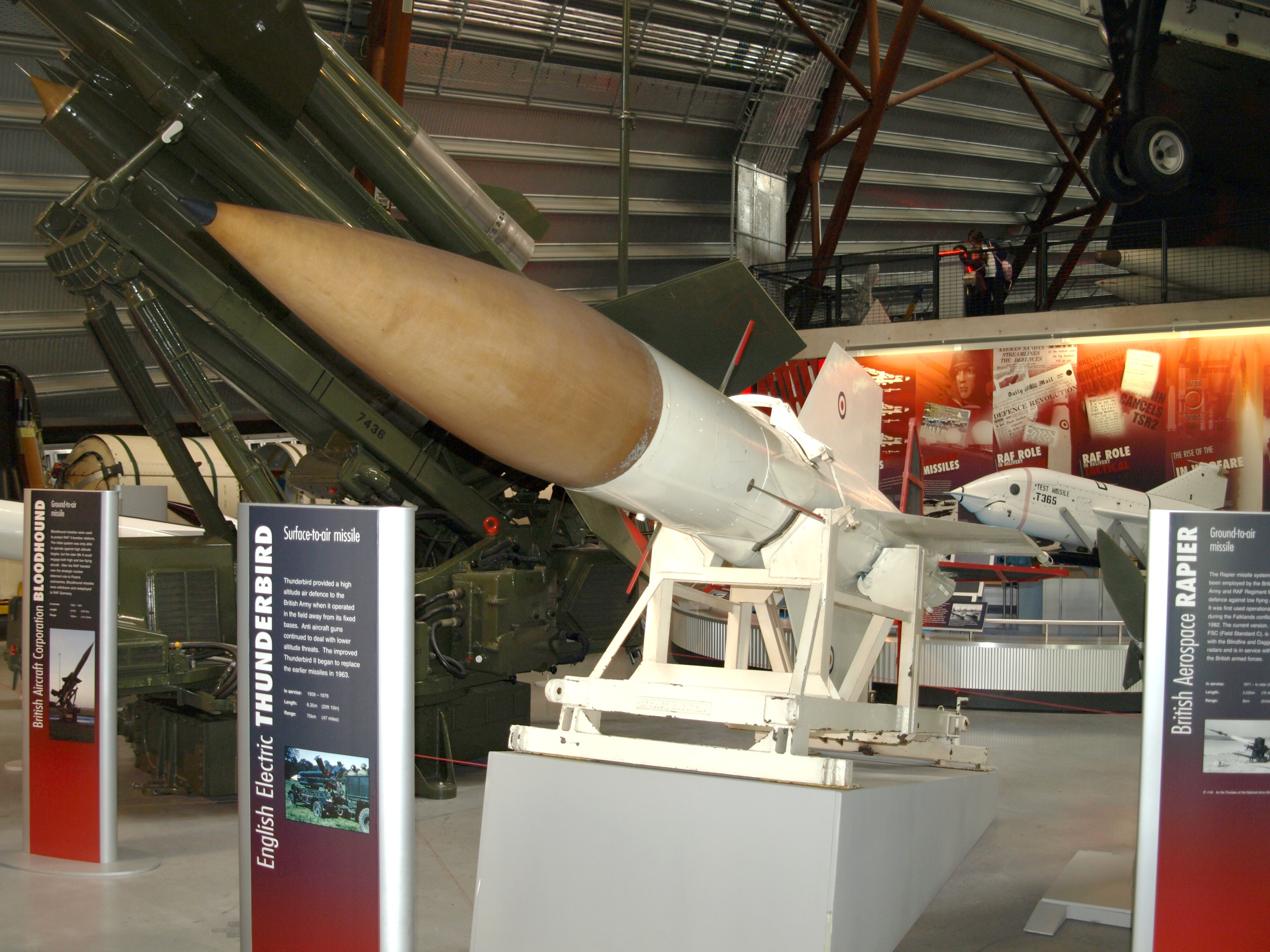
The English Electric Thunderbird surface-to-air missile on display in the National Cold War Exhibition hall

== Michael Beetham Conservation Centre ==
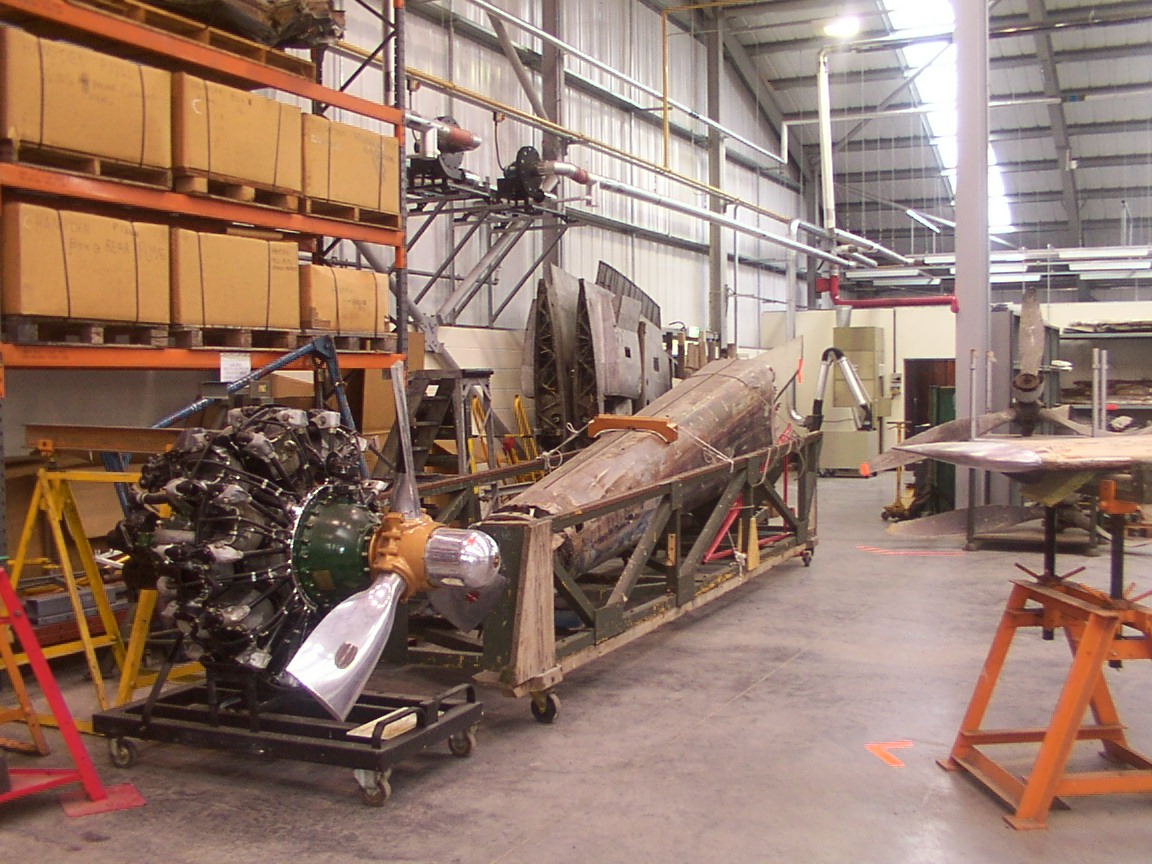
Michael Beetham Conservation Centre

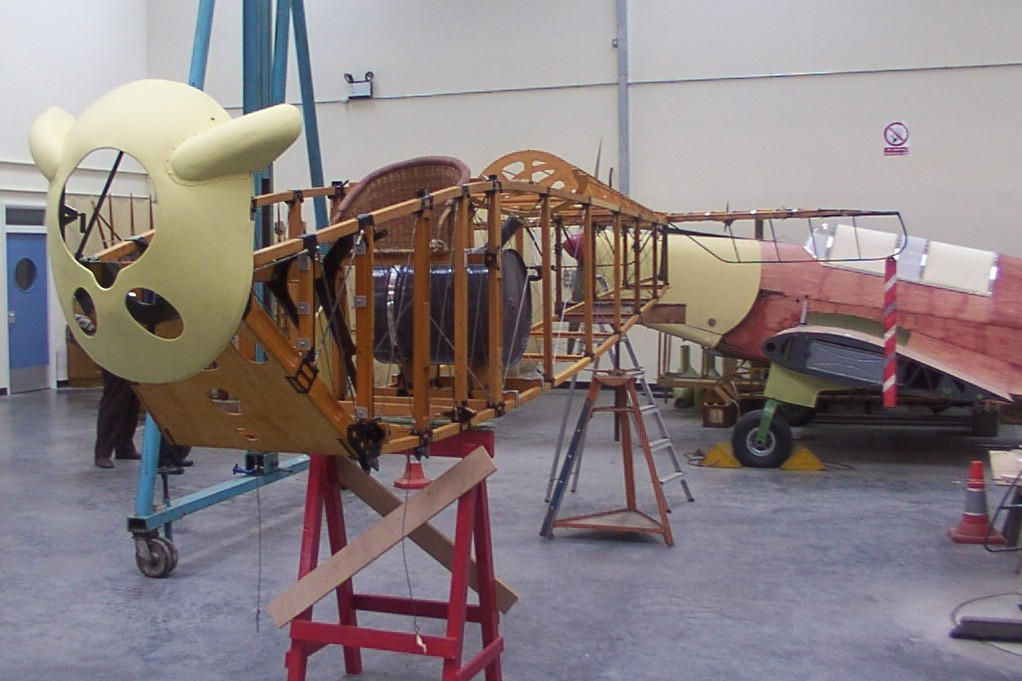
A Sopwith Dolphin under restoration in 2003 with the Miles Mohawk behind

Also on the museum site is the Michael Beetham Conservation Centre. The centre restores aircraft and artefacts for display at both Midlands and London. It is named in honour of Marshal of the Royal Air Force Sir Michael James Beetham, GCB, CBE, DFC, AFC, DL and it was opened by him on 13 May 2002.

Aircraft currently in storage or long-term restoration include:

- Handley Page Hampden
- LVG C.VI
- Dornier Do 17

== See also ==
- List of aerospace museums
