= Wasserfall =

German surface-to-air missile

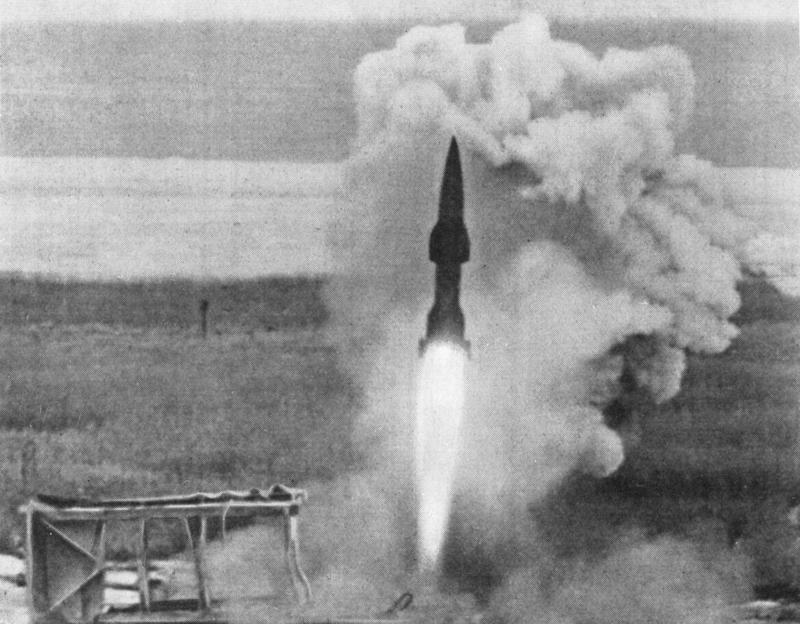
- Wasserfall test at Peenemünde, autumn 1944
- Type: Surface-to-air missile
- Place of origin: Germany

Specifications
- Mass: 3,700 kilograms (8,200 lb)
- Length: 7.85 metres (25.8 ft)
- Diameter: 0.88 metres (2 ft 11 in)
- Wingspan: 2.51 metres (8 ft 3 in)
- Warhead: 235 kilograms (518 lb)
- Detonation mechanism: Manual detonation or proximity fuse
- Engine: Liquid-propellant rocket motor
- Propellant: Initially Salbei (Nitric Acid) as oxidiser, later changed to Mixed Acid (90% Nitric Acid 10% Sulphuric Acid). Initially Visol as fuel, later changed to Optoline.
- Operational range: 24 kilometres (15 mi)
- Flight ceiling: 14 kilometres (8.7 mi)
- Maximum speed: 770 metres per second (1,700 mph)
- Guidance system: Manual command to line of sight (MCLOS); operator used a radio command link to steer the missile along the optical line of sight from launch point to target
- Launch platform: Fixed

The C2 "Wasserfall" Ferngelenkte Flakrakete ("Waterfall remote-controlled anti-aircraft rocket") was a German guided supersonic surface-to-air missile project of World War II. Development was not completed before the end of the war and it was not used operationally.

The system was based on many of the technologies developed for the V-2 rocket program. Significant additional development was required, including design and test of an effective guidance system to allow interception of an air target, adoption of hypergolic fuels to allow the missile to stand ready for launch for days or weeks, and the development of a reliable proximity fuse.^{234}

== Technical characteristics ==
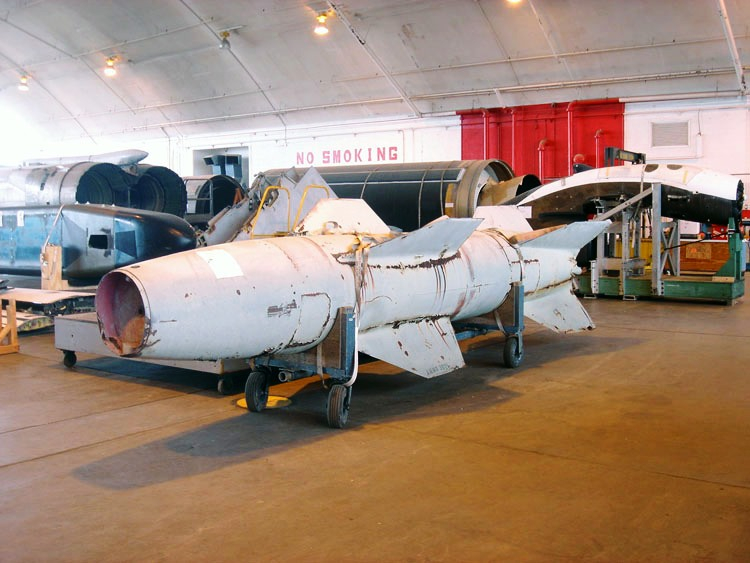
Wasserfall rocket displayed at the National Museum of the United States Air Force, 2007

Wasserfall was essentially an anti-aircraft development of the V-2 rocket, sharing the same general layout and shaping. Since the missile had to fly only to the altitudes of the attacking bombers, and needed a far smaller warhead to destroy these, it could be much smaller than the V-2, about 1/4 the size. The Wasserfall design also included an additional set of stub wings located at the middle of the fuselage to provide extra manoeuvring capability.Steering during the launch phase was accomplished by four graphite vanes placed in the exhaust stream of the combustion chamber, as with the V-2, but once sufficient airspeed had been attained this was accomplished by four air rudders mounted on the rocket tail. Each rudder and graphite vane was mounted on a common shaft operated by a dedicated servo motor.

Unlike the V-2, Wasserfall was designed to stand ready for periods of up to a month and fire on command, therefore the volatile liquid oxygen used in the V-2 was inappropriate. Dr. Walter Thiel designed a new rocket motor, which used Visol (vinyl isobutyl ether) and nitric acid. This hypergolic mixture was forced into the combustion chamber by pressurising the fuel tanks with nitrogen gas released from another tank. The pressurised nitrogen was released to the tanks by a pyrotechnically operated valve. When the tanks were up to pressure a series of burst diaphragms ruptured, allowing fuel and oxidant to flow to the combustion chamber. The oxidant flowed through the combustion chamber cooling jacket before flowing into the chamber itself. Motor burn time was 45 seconds and sufficient velocity was achieved to support a further 45 seconds of unpowered pursuit.^{:58} Wasserfall was to be launched from rocket bases (code-named Vesuvius) with water flood systems to dilute leaked hypergolic fuels in the event of a launch problem.

Several guidance systems were in development but none were completed by the end of the war. The simplest (code name Burgund) used a manually operated optical target tracker and a separate manually operated optical missile tracker, each with its own operator. The missile tracker operator was provided with a joystick to send guidance commands to the missile using a modified version of the FuG 203/FuG 230 "Kehl-Straßburg" radio control system.

Because Wasserfall was launched vertically, rather from an angled launcher, it had to be steered to come within the line of sight between the missile tracker operator and the target. This flight path was calculated by an analog electro-mechanical Einlenkrechner ("Initial Course Computer"). The first six seconds of missile flight were vertical, under the control of the missile internal gyro stabilised autopilot. After this the Einlenkrechner, taking input from the optical target tracker, automatically guided the optical missile tracker (but not the missile) to describe the calculated missile path, as it would be seen by the missile tracker operator. The missile tracker operator had to send guidance commands to the missile to keep it in the moving cross hairs of his optical tracker as it was automatically slewed in azimuth and elevation by the Einlenkrechner, thus causing the Wasserfall to fly the course computed by the Einlenkrechner. Once the missile tracker sight and Wasserfall missile was within 0.5 degrees of the target line of sight, the Einlenkrechner disengaged, allowing the missile tracker operator to maintain the missile on line of the sight with the target until the engagement completed. The missile tracker operator was provided with a control to detonate the missile warhead when the point of closest approach between missile and target was achieved.^{:82}

An optical guidance system for Wasserfall which used the more advanced Fug512/E530 Kogge/Brigg radio control system but was otherwise identical to Burgund, was given the code name Franken.^{:87}

Night-time or poor weather use was considerably more complex because neither the target nor the missile would be easily visible. For this role an alternative guidance system, code named Elsass, was under development. Elsass used a Würzburg or Mannheim radar for target tracking and a separate passive missile tracker that picked up a signal from a radio transmitter (known as Ruse) in the missile. As with the optically guided systems, the Einlenkrechner computer directed the missile tracker to provide the missile tracking operator with a course to bring the Wasserfall from vertical launch to line of sight with the target. Once the missile was close to line of sight between the missile tracker and the target, it created a strong blip on the missile tracker operators CRT display. The missile tracker operator then used the joystick to guide the missile so that the blip representing the missile moves to the centre of the missile tracker display. The missile tracker was kept pointing at the target using coordinates fed to it from the target tracking radar.^{:84}^{:187}

A radar guidance system which used the more advanced Fug512/E530 Kogge/Brigg radio control system, but was otherwise identical to Elsass, was given the code name Brabant.^{:87}^{:193}

== Development ==
Conceptual work began in 1941.

On 18 September 1942 the Inspector of Anti-Aircraft Artillery, General Walter Von Axthelm, issued a programme for the development of new Anti-Aircraft Artillery, which was approved by Reichmarschall Hermann Goering.^{:72}

The Army Ordnance team at Peenemünde studied three anti-aircraft rockets; the solid propellant C1, the liquid fuelled C2 and the two stage C3. The C1 and the C3 were not progressed, and the C2 was handed to the Future Projects Office of Dr. Ludwig Roth, under the Technical Direction of Dr. Wernher von Braun. Development was undertaken as a joint Army Ordnance - Luftwaffe project^{:231.} The initial architecture for the C2 was produced by Werner K Dahm, who was a member of Roths team. The initial design (identified as C2/E1) was submitted to the aerodynamics team of Dr. Rudolf Hermann. It called for unswept cruciform wings that were considerably longer than the tail fins. They were also offset by 45 degrees from the axial line of the fins. However, model testing in the supersonic wind tunnel at Peenemünde showed that this configuration exhibited an unacceptably large movement of the Centre Of Pressure depending upon airframe speed. This was rectified by moving the wings further back, shortening them, sweeping the leading edge on a sharper angle, and enlarging the tail fins. This resulted in wings and tail of similar shape and size. The offset in the line of the wings and tail were also found to introduce unpredictable instability at higher angles of attack, so the offset was removed. These changes yielded the C2/E2 variant.

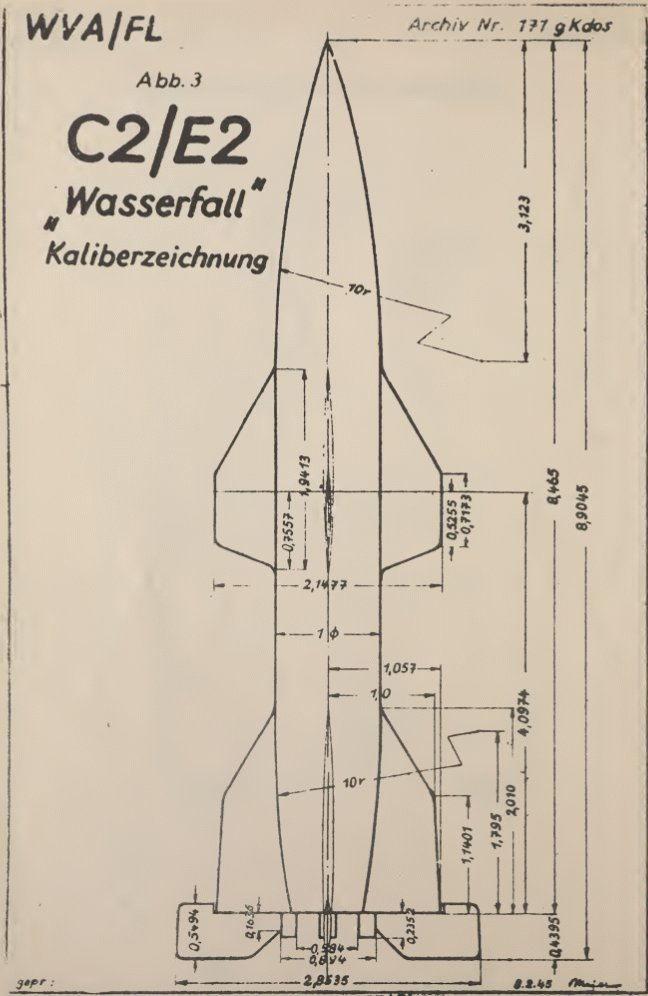
Wasserfall C2/E2 dimensioned diagram

A ground based simulator was developed that combined an electronic analog computer with a missile operator display and joystick. This was used to model missile response to operator control inputs and assess the operator response to various control behaviours.

In order to ease production the airframe was designed to be fabricated in sections that could be produced by separate dispersed manufacturers. Each was designed to be relatively simple to manufacture, except for the tail section which contained the complex and highly classified engine, radio receiver, gyros, Mischgerät and fin servos. Concentrating complex systems in the tail section also ensured that they were accessible from the ground without requiring ladders or towers. This was a lesson learned from difficulties with the V2, which had its guidance system in its nose.

Uses of critical materials was avoided, with the airframe being manufactured from steel rather than scarce aluminium needed for aircraft manufacture. Availability of graphite for guidance vanes was a cause of significant concern, as supplies were limited and it was critical to make electrodes for refining steel. Alternatives including ceramics, silicon carbide and possibly even oak were considered.

The first models were being tested in March 1943, but a major setback occurred in August 1943 when Dr. Walter Thiel was killed during the Operation Hydra bombings, the start of the Allied campaign against German V-weapons including V-2 production.

The first test launch was on 29 February 1944 with a second on 8 March 1944.^{:68.} Both used C2/E1 "long wing" airframes that were constructed before the wind tunnel tests had identified the problems with that configuration. Both had only basic two gyro autopilots intended to maintain a vertical trajectory and the Askania servos used on the V2 missile.^{:237}

A third launch was undertaken on 12 May 1944. This was the first C2/E2 configuration airframe to be launched. It carried newly delivered Siemens gyros and servos from their K12 autopilot system. These were connected using a modified V2 missile Mischgerät analog computer, which derived angular rate information from the attitude servos and mixed the signals to derive an individual control signal for each rudder servo.^{:237}

The fourth launch attempt on 8 June 1944 was a total failure, when the explosive bolt system that released the missile from its launch trolley failed to operate correctly. The missile and the launch trolley rose into the air, nosed over and crashed in nearby woods.^{:237}

Thirty-five Wasserfall trial firings had been completed by the time Peenemünde was evacuated on 17 February 1945. While test flights were made that included a ground based operator who controlled the missile course, no tests against targets were undertaken.

The test programme revealed a design defect, which allowed fuel and oxidiser to be thrown forward at engine cutoff. Being hypergolic, this would cause an explosion which would destroy the test vehicle.

As with the V2, the availability of fin servos that were sufficiently powerful, responsive and reliable remained a problem throughout the development of Wasserfall. Two possible alternatives to the Siemens K12 electro-hydraulic units were in development. One was purely electrical, being an electric motor with reduction gearing. The other was purely hydraulic, provided with an oil supply pressurised by the same nitrogen that pressurised the fuel system. The oil was vented after use and only enough was supplied for the 90 second flight time of the missile. The final five flights tested alternative servos, but only one of these flight was considered successful.

Shortages of basic components, such as vacuum tubes, diverted effort into the search for alternatives. Magnetic amplifiers and relays "chattering" at their resonant frequency were both investigated as gyro position signal amplifiers.

On 1 February 1945 Dr. Ludwig Roth issued a design proposal for a successor to Wasserfall that was reduced in size. The design aims were to require only 30% of the nitric acid oxidiser that was needed for Wasserfall and to reduce the amount of alloy steel needed in its construction. It retained the overall aerodynamic form of Wasserfall, but with a body width of 640mm and a length of 5680mm, it would carry a warhead of 80kg with an additional 20kg destruction charge to break up the missile into small pieces, as it was to be used over home territory. As an alternative to the high pressure nitrogen tank used in Wasserfall it was proposed to use the spherical compressed air tank developed for the V1 flying bomb. The missile would require 150kg of alloy steel, compared to 550kg required for Wasserfall. Thrust from the smaller engine would be reduced to 2900kg (8000kg for Wasserfall). Maximum range would be reduced to 20km (24km for Wasserfall) and altitude to 12km (14km for Wasserfall). Unlike Wasserfall there was no space in the nose for a homing device or proximity fuse. As this design was issued a matter of weeks before Peenemünde was evacuated, it was not progressed to development.

The V2 was also used to test subsystems for Wasserfall. The Bäckebo rocket which crashed in Sweden on 13 June 1944 was intended as a test flight for the Wasserfall radio control system.

== Assessment ==
According to Albert Speer and Carl Krauch it could have devastated the Allied bomber fleets. Speer, Germany's Reich Minister of Armaments and War Production, later claimed:

To this day, I am convinced that substantial deployment of Wasserfall from the spring of 1944 onward, together with an uncompromising use of the jet fighters as air defense interceptors, would have essentially stalled the Allied strategic bombing offensive against our industry. We would have well been able to do that – after all, we managed to manufacture 900 V-2 rockets per month at a later time when resources were already much more limited.

— Albert Speer, Reich Minister of Armaments and War Production, memoir.

== See also ==
- Enzian
- Rheintochter
- Henschel Hs 117 Schmetterling ("Butterfly")
- List of missiles
- List of German guided weapons of World War II
- List of surface-to-air missiles
- Wunderwaffe
