= German Aeronautical Research Institute =

Secret German aerospace research facility during the Second World War

Deutsche LFA wind tunnel. 1940
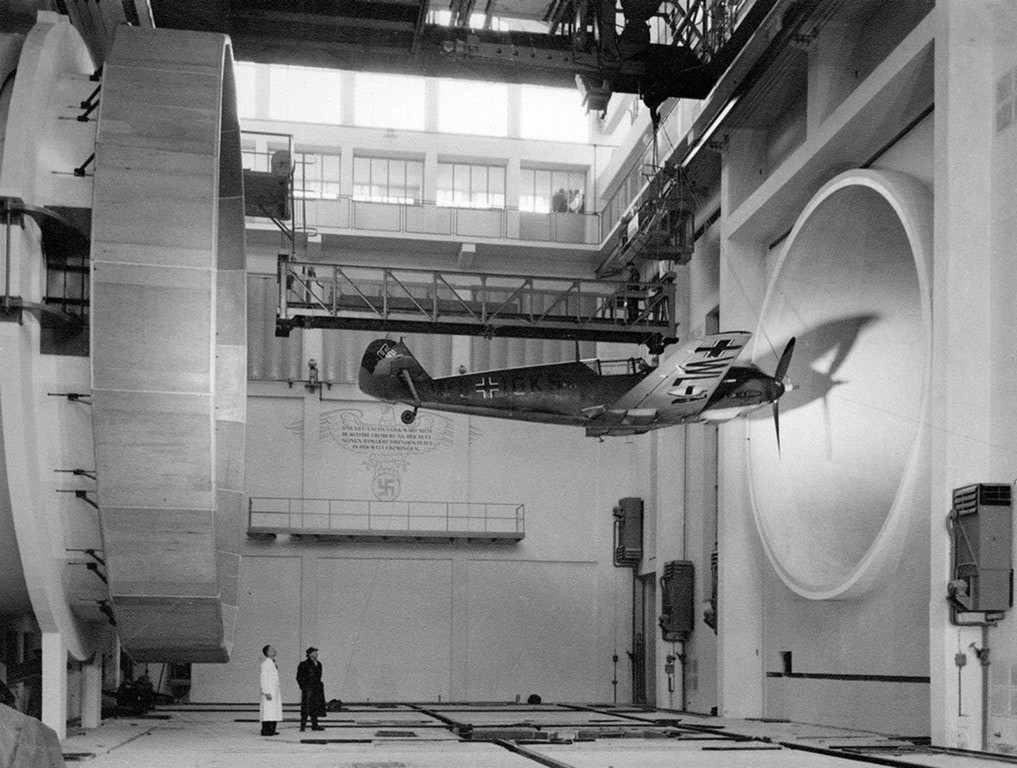
- Messerschmitt Bf 109F wind tunnel testing, 1940

The Deutsche Luftfahrtforschungsanstalt (LFA/German Aeronautical Research Institute, also known as the Hermann Göring Research Institute) was a secret German facility for airframe, aeroengine, and aircraft weapons testing during the Second World War. It was located near Völkenrode, on the western outskirts of Braunschweig (Brunswick), near what became the Inner German Border. The site was Germany's "most advanced and extensive [aviation] research establishment, outside of the existing Erprobungsstelle network of military aviation evaluation facilities, themselves headquartered at Rechlin.

== History and activities ==
=== Site layout ===
It was a 1,000-acre (400 ha) site begun in October 1935. The first wind tunnel was begun in November 1936. Most of the sixty buildings, scattered around the site, did not exceed treetop height, and all were well-camouflaged, to reduce the chance of them being detected by aerial reconnaissance and to avoid making them targets, as the wind tunnels of the Deutsche Versuchsanstalt für Luftfahrt (DVL) in Adlershof (near Berlin) or the Aerodynamische Versuchsanstalt (AVA, part of today's DLR agency) at the University of Göttingen were.

The buildings were in five groups. The Institute of Aerodynamics had five wind tunnels, while the Institute of Gas Dynamics had its own high-speed tunnel; both were at the southern end of the campus. The static testing station of the Institute of Strength Properties was to the west; the Institute of Engine Research, the east. Weapons research was done by the Institute of Kinematics in a 400 m (1,300 ft)-long tunnel in the northwest corner. These were accompanied by administration buildings, a canteen, a telephone exchange, guard houses, generators, and other facilities.

To help reduce the risk of detection, there were no railway lines in, nor overhead power lines, nor any chimneys; and uniquely for an aviation research facility of its time in Germany, no runways, taxiways or hardstands for active aviation operations; just about all of the facility's infrastructure needs were supplied underground from Braunschweig, including steam heat.

In addition, there were four hundred houses in Völkenrode for the 1,500 or so workers and scientists.

=== Work and research ===
==== Wind tunnels ====
Each of the wind tunnels at LFA was given an "A" number. A1 had a circular nozzle 2.5 m (8 ft 2 in) in diameter, producing a maximum speed of 123 mph (198 km/h; 107 kn); it entered service in 1937, the year after construction began on facilities. A2 measured 4 m (13 ft 1 in) long and had a test section 2.8 m (9 ft 2 in) in diameter (coated with Keratylene to keep the flow smooth), capable of generating test speeds (depending on the model's scale) of between Mach 1 and 1.2. It was driven by a pair of 600 kW (800 hp) DC electric motors, and fitted with interferometer and striation gear for study of flow patterns. Begun in 1937, it first ran in 1939. It did, however, suffer with problems of vibration, leading the research teams to rely on a Rheinmetall-Börsig F25 free-flight research rocket with models mounted in the nose. The A3 tunnel, largest at the LFA site, had an 8 m (26 ft 3 in) test section with a maximum speed of 95 m/s (210 mph; 185 kn) and a working length of 11 m (36 ft 1 in), enough to accommodate a Messerschmitt Bf 109's fuselage. It was powered by a pair of 6 MW (8,000 hp; 8,200 PS). The A9 building housed a pair of supersonic wind tunnels, each driven by a 4 MW (5,400 hp; 5,400 PS) motor, with a maximum speed of Mach 1.5, but a test section diameter of only 80 cm^{2} (12 in^{2}).

==== Materials testing ====
Along with direct aerodynamic research, LFA did testing on materials (though not, apparently, of parts) and on aircraft engines. The engine work included testing of turbine and turbine blade shapes, ceramic turbine blades, cooling of turbine blades (including liquid cooling), bearings, detonation, and several types of heat exchangers, among other things.

==== Engineering ====
The test centre assisted the BMW firm in developing the factory-produced forward cowling — which had the engine's oil cooler integrated into it from the beginning — for their BMW 801 fourteen-cylinder radial engine used in many German Luftwaffe military aircraft, most importantly the Focke-Wulf Fw 190A; trials indicated it was possible to reduce drag enough to save 150–200 hp (110–150 kW; 150–200 PS), as well as to maximize pressure build-up to assist cooling. It also helped in development of the pioneering Argus As 014 pulsejet used in the V-1. In collaboration with Göttingen and DVL (Berlin-Adlershof), it also contributed to the development of the swept wing (what Germans called Pfeilflügel, or "arrow wing").

Among the engine projects worked on at LFA was a toroidal (swing-piston) design by Otto Lutz of Büssing, a concept akin to the Wankel; work was also done by Junkers and Bosch.

=== Significance and legacy ===
LFA remained so secret, the Allied air forces never bombed it.

Postwar, the Fedden Mission of a Ministry of Aircraft Production team led by Roy Fedden visited the site.

== Sources ==
- Christopher, John. The Race for Hitler's X-Planes. The Mill, Gloucestershire: History Press, 2013.
