= Rheinbote =

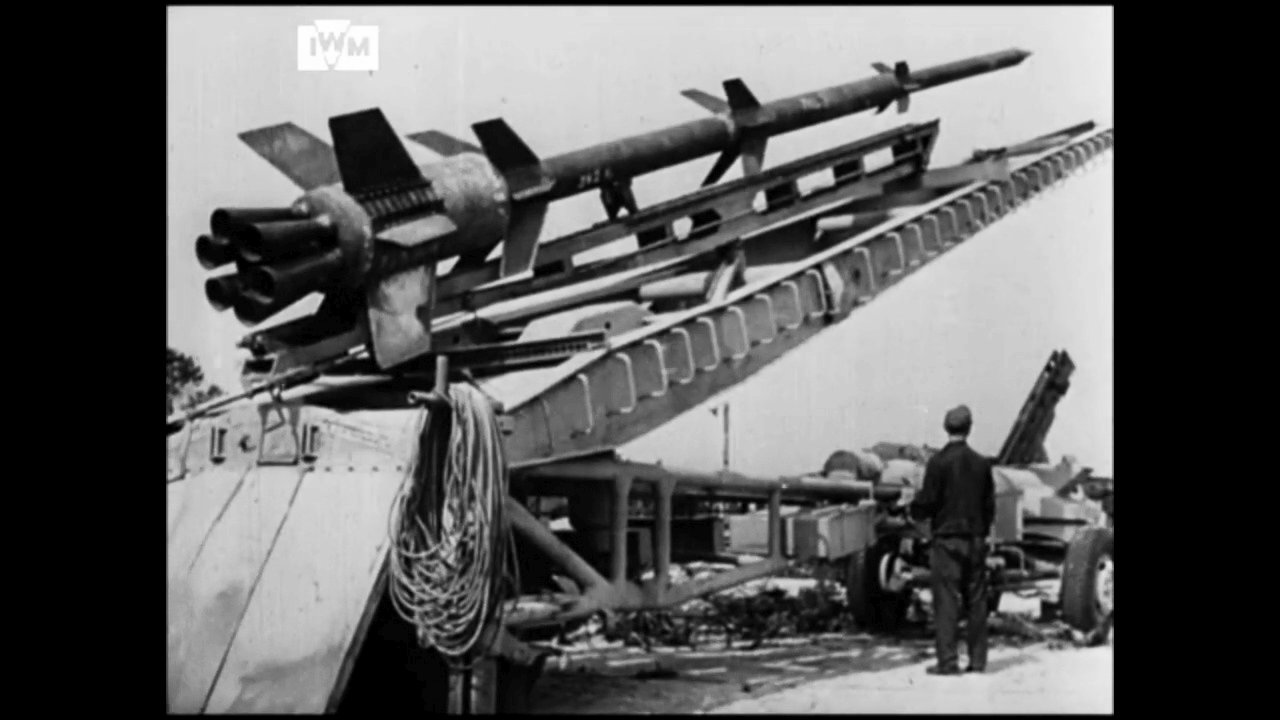
- Rheinbote on a modified Meillerwagen (1944?)
- Type: Unguided ballistic artillery rocket
- Place of origin: Nazi Germany

Service history
- In service: 1944–1945
- Used by: Nazi Germany
- Wars: World War II

Production history
- Designer: Rheinmetall-Borsig
- Designed: 1941–1944
- Manufacturer: Rheinmetall-Borsig
- Developed from: Rheintochter
- Produced: 1944–1945
- No. built: ~200

Specifications
- Mass: 1,715 kg (3,781 lb)
- Length: 11.4 m (37 ft 5 in)
- Diameter: 535 mm (21.1 in)
- Engine: Four-stage solid-fuel rocket
- Operational range: 160–230 km (100–140 mi)
- Guidance system: None; fin-stabilised ballistic flight
- Launch platform: Modified Meillerwagen or 8.8 cm Flak 41 mounting

Rheinbote (lit. 'Rhine Messenger'), also known as Rh Z 61/9 and Raketen-Sprenggranate 4831, was a German four-stage, solid-fuel, unguided ballistic artillery rocket developed by Rheinmetall-Borsig during the Second World War. Sometimes referred to in postwar literature as V-4, by analogy with the V-1 and V-2 vengeance weapons, the weapon was assigned the code name Meteor by the Wehrmacht.

This short-range ballistic rocket was intended to provide long-range mobile artillery fire without the logistical burden of railway guns or very heavy artillery. Unlike the liquid-fuelled V-2, Rheinbote used a sequence of solid-fuel stages. It carried only a small warhead and its unguided ballistic flight made it too inaccurate for effective military use.

Rheinbote was the first multi-stage rocket used operationally in warfare. It was used against Antwerp at a time when the city’s port functioned as one of the principal Allied logistical bases in north-west Europe. These launches were conducted from the occupied Netherlands in December 1944 and January 1945. Later calculations indicate that the rockets fired from the Nunspeet area overshot Antwerp by more than 50 km (31 mi) and fell in the Ghent area.

Historical studies generally concluded that the missile was militarily ineffective because of its small warhead, wide dispersion and poor practical accuracy. The concept of a long-range solid-fuel battlefield rocket remained undeveloped after the war.

== History ==
=== Origins ===
One of the problems facing the German military, and mobile armies more generally, was the weight of large-calibre artillery and the difficulty of supplying its ammunition. Mobile battlefield rocket systems offered a possible way to deliver long-range fire without the logistical burden of large-calibre guns, railway artillery and their ammunition trains. The conceptual background to Rheinbote lay in previous Rheinmetall-Borsig rocket developments, including the Rheintochter surface-to-air missile.

German engineers and artillery officers examined whether a fin-stabilised solid-fuel rocket could deliver artillery fire at ranges of 100 km (62 mi) or more. The design goal required a theoretical burnout velocity of about 1,350 m/s (4,900 km/h; 3,000 mph), which could not be achieved by a single powder rocket carrying a useful payload. The solution adopted was a multi-stage solid-fuel rocket in which successive propulsion units separated after burnout.

The origins of the Rheinbote project lay in studies submitted by the Arbeitsgruppe Z at Rheinmetall-Borsig to the Heereswaffenamt in 1941. These studies proposed rockets capable of delivering payloads of 250 kg (550 lb), 500 kg (1,100 lb) and 1,000 kg (2,200 lb) to a range of about 120 km (75 mi). Because of the large amount of propellant required, the Heereswaffenamt instead requested a weapon with a reduced payload and a range of approximately 200 km (120 mi).

The concept for the four-stage solid-fuel rocket was presented to the Heereswaffenamt by Heinrich Klein in April 1941. It was initially rejected by Walter Dornberger's Wa Prüf 11 department, partly because of the general shortage of powder and partly because Dornberger expected the liquid-fuelled V-2 rocket to satisfy the long-range rocket requirement. Klein later gained support in the artillery section of the Heereswaffenamt, where officers objected to the exclusive emphasis on liquid-fuel rockets. General Emil Leeb was eventually persuaded to authorise a limited development programme for multi-stage solid-fuel rockets. The Heereswaffenamt consequently supported two competing long-range weapons intended for use against England: the V-2 liquid-fuel rocket and the Rheinmetall multi-stage solid-fuel rocket.

Development began in 1942 under Heinrich Klein at Rheinmetall-Borsig. His team reportedly consisted of about 40 workers. The Rheinmetall project designation Rh Z 61 derived from Rheinmetall-Borsig, project Z and a concealed reference to the intended 160 km (99 mi) range, with the digits reversed and the zero omitted. In 1944, Joseph Goebbels called on Wehrmacht authorities to propose "names with emotive effect" for "especially high-quality” new weapons in order to "make them known in the home country and enhance their propaganda impact on enemy and neutral countries abroad." The Rheinbote received the "suggestive name" of Meteor.

=== Development and testing ===
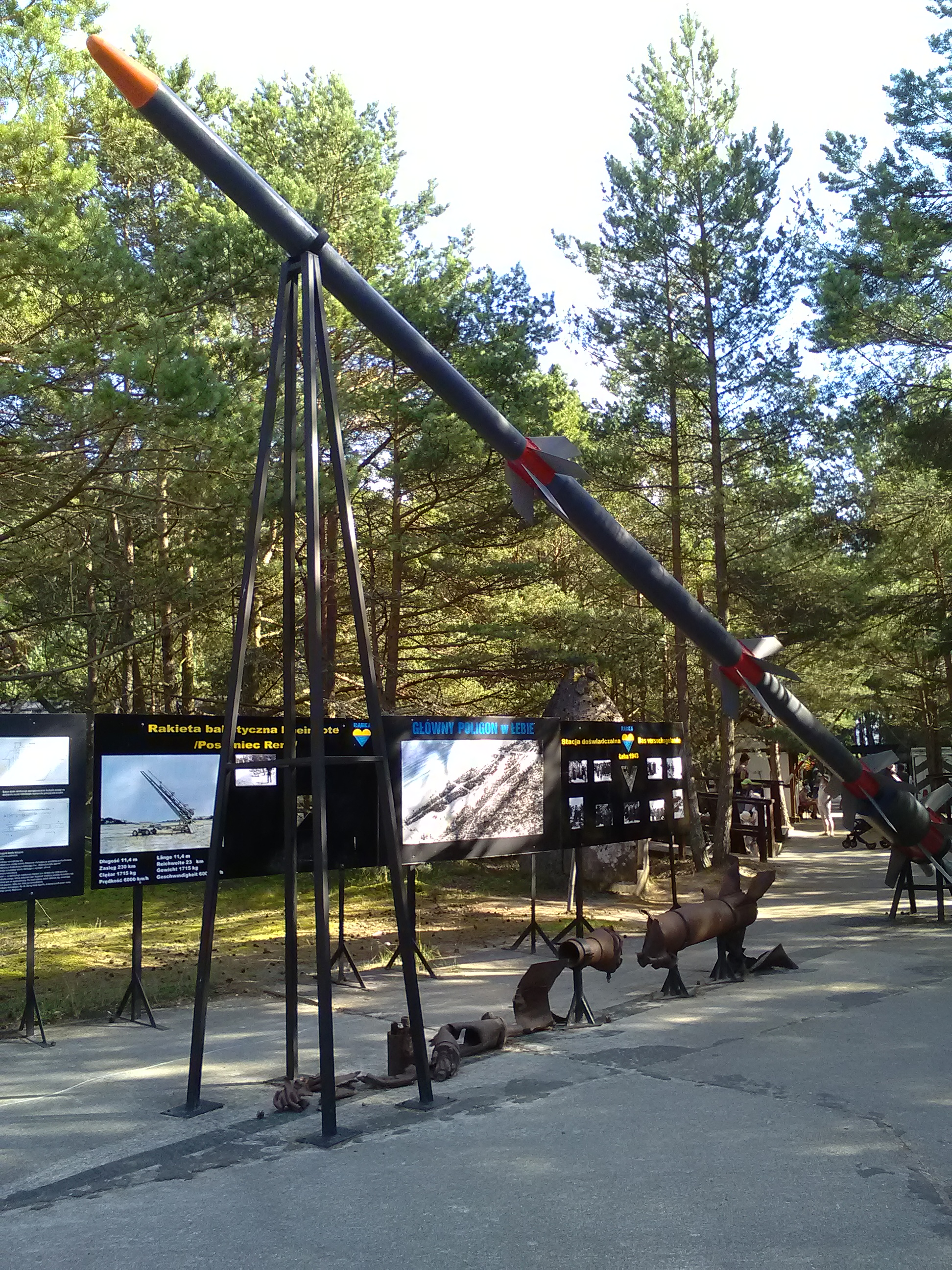
Rheinbote at the Rocket Launcher Museum in Rąbka, Poland (2017)

Early designs used two rocket stages, but the requirement for greater range led first to three-stage and finally to four-stage designs. The necessary increase in propellant mass forced a progressive reduction in payload. Initial experiments used small solid-fuel rocket units derived from aircraft take-off assistance rockets to examine launch behaviour, separation, stability and fin design. The first one-stage experimental rocket weighed about 52 kg (115 lb) and carried 17 kg (37 lb) of propellant; a two-stage test article weighed about 110 kg (240 lb); and a later three-stage test article weighed about 62 kg (137 lb).

The development sequence included several experimental versions. The German account lists Rh Z V1 as a small fin-stabilised take-off-assistance rocket, Rh Z V4 as an early two-stage design, Rh Z V10 to V18 as three-stage experimental weapons and Rh Z V25 as the first four-stage version. The Rh Z V25 reportedly weighed about 360 kg (790 lb), carried a 1 kg (2.2 lb) flash charge and was calculated for a burnout velocity of about 1,250 m/s (4,500 km/h; 2,800 mph) and a range of 90 km (56 mi). The later Rh Z 61/2 was a full-size four-stage design weighing about 1,640 kg (3,620 lb), but it still required changes to stage ignition and fin construction.

Because Rheinbote did not receive a high priority, testing of the powder rocket began only in December 1942. Although initial tests were carried out at Ludwigsfelde, testing took place in 1943 at the Rumbke rocket test site near Łeba, on the Pomeranian coast. The Łeba range was suited to Rheinbote trials because rockets could be fired westward over the Baltic and observed along a long over-water trajectory. Observation points on Bornholm, about 170 km (110 mi) from Łeba were used to follow long-range test flights and impacts by optical instruments. Many launches reportedly ended in failures or required major modifications to the missile. Three early missiles were ready by April 1943 and were demonstrated from a short launch stand originally associated with the Feuerlilie programme. According to Henshall, the Rheinbote was originally intended as a reserve weapon in case the V-1 weapon program failed.

The Rh Z 61/9 configuration had emerged by 1943, but the weapon was not yet operationally mature. In this version, the fins were changed from welded to riveted construction, the ignition of the final stage was modified, and the start stage used electrical ignition. Testing continued through 1944 at Posen, with unresolved issues in stage behaviour, launching arrangements and fuzing.

A secret Heereswaffenamt memorandum of 25 November 1943 compared several long-range weapons, including the Hochdruckpumpe, the V-2, Rheinbote and the smooth-bore K 5 railway gun. The document treated Rheinbote as a gun-like long-range firing system rather than simply as a rocket, partly because the term "rocket" was politically and bureaucratically sensitive within the German weapons programme.

=== Cancellation threat and production ===
In April 1944 the project narrowly avoided cancellation. At that time only developments in the highest urgency category were supposed to continue and Rheinbote did not have that status. Oberstleutnant Tröller, the Heereswaffenamt officer responsible for the weapon, reportedly preserved the programme by telling his hierarchy that the emerging SS weapons administration had shown interest in the multi-stage rocket. The necessary raw materials for 200 Rheinbote were then made available.

On 29 September 1944, four missiles were launched during a demonstration for the Heereswaffenamt. One malfunctioned and impacted about 200 m (220 yd) from the firing position. A report dated 30 September 1944 stated that the weapon was not yet fully operational, that the fuze problem remained unresolved and that no full maximum-range firing had yet been completed. Because the weapon required a large quantity of propellant to deliver only a small explosive payload, Walter Dornberger reportedly recommended that the trials be stopped. Testing and production nevertheless continued, largely because of pressure from Hans Kammler and the political demand for additional Vergeltungswaffen or "reprisal weapons".

By October 1944 the first production-series Rheinbote rockets were tested. A later demonstration took place at Łeba on 15 November 1944 before senior representatives of the Heereswaffenamt, the artillery branch and the SS weapons administration. The demonstration involved a salvo of four missiles followed by further single launches. Stage ignition and separation were reportedly audible and heavy smoke at the firing position made it advisable to move clear after launch. One rocket was apparently disturbed by the blast of a neighbouring launch because the weapons had been placed too close together for the demonstration; it returned to the firing area and detonated without causing serious damage. The recorded range of successful launches was about 153–157 km (95–98 mi).

In November 1944, Adolf Hitler ordered the formation of a Rheinbote battery and the immediate production of 300 missiles. By the end of 1944, 154 missiles had reportedly been produced at the Rheinmetall works in Berlin-Marienfelde, followed by a further 88 in January 1945. Production required about 130 labour hours per missile, and the unit cost was given as about 5,500 Reichsmark.

Production ended on 6 February 1945. German assessments concluded that the missile did not justify the use of more than 590 kg (1,300 lb) of propellant and two tons of high-grade steel to deliver an explosive charge of only about 25 kg (55 lb).

=== Operational use ===
Launch of a Rheinbote from a modified Meillerwagen

Operational use began in late 1944. Rheinbote had originally been designed so that it could serve as a fourth long-range weapon for use against London, alongside the V-1, V-2 and V-3, but its slow development, completed only in October 1944, prevented such use. The German long-range bombardment campaign had shifted toward Antwerp, which had become an essential Allied port after its liberation in 1944. The bombardment of Antwerp by V-1 and V-2 weapons created a new operational role for Rheinbote. By the end of December 1944, a total of 115 Rheinbote were available.

Artillerie-Abteilung (mot.) 709 was formed to conduct the firing. The unit was formed at the end of November 1944 and took up firing positions in the Netherlands in December 1944. The unit was subordinated to Kammler's Division zur Vergeltung (lit. 'Division for retaliation'), headquartered at Haaksbergen, which coordinated the operational use of several German long-range weapon systems in the final phase of the war. With the employment of Rheinbote from 24 December 1944, the division briefly controlled three of the four principal German long-range weapons then in service: the V-2, the Hochdruckpumpe and Rheinbote.

The battalion arrived on 12 December 1944 by rail on the southern shore of the IJsselmeer near Nunspeet and Zwolle, with about 240 personnel and four launch vehicles. Four launch positions were prepared in the Soerel woods, arranged in pairs roughly 70–80 m (230–260 ft) apart. From there the distance to Antwerp was approximately 165 km (103 mi). Because range tables had not yet been completed, the launch elevation for a target distance of about 165 km (103 mi) had to be calculated.

The first salvo was fired at noon on 24 December 1944. Six salvos of four rockets, 24 missiles in total, were fired toward Antwerp within about one hour. About 20 more rockets were fired by mid-January 1945. When no further rockets were available, the unit was withdrawn from Nunspeet. Later test values showed that the 64-degree elevation used in Holland gave a mean impact point at about 230 km (140 mi), not at the 165 km (103 mi) distance to Antwerp. The rockets therefore could not have struck Antwerp and must have overshot the city by more than 50 km (31 mi), falling in the Ghent area.

The number of operational launches is disputed. Hölsken describes 24 ready rockets fired on 24 December 1944 and about 20 further launches before the unit withdrew in mid-January 1945. Other later secondary accounts give higher totals, from about 70 to more than 200 launches. The lower figure appears to refer specifically to the documented Nunspeet operation, while the higher figures may include produced missiles, planned firings or less precisely documented launches.

=== Assessment ===
No reliable statements survive about the effect of the operational firings at their actual impact sites. The bombardment caused little military effect. The missile's small warhead, large dispersion and apparent overshoot meant that the port of Antwerp was probably not hit and the attack was overshadowed by the much larger V-1 and V-2 bombardment of the city. Some warheads also penetrated deeply into the ground before detonating, further reducing their destructive effect.

A Rheinmetall-Borsig report of 13 December 1944 gives one of the few concrete descriptions of the rocket's destructive effect. In a test impact at a farmstead, a Rheinbote produced a crater 1.20 m (3.9 ft) deep and 3.50 m (11.5 ft) in diameter. Nearby buildings suffered splinter and roof damage: the roof of a barn 5–15 m (16–49 ft) away was partly torn off, the roof of a stable 15 m (49 ft) away was almost completely stripped and the roof of a house 35 m (115 ft) away was badly damaged.

After the war, the Soviet Union examined captured German missile technology, including elements of the Rheinbote programme.

== Design ==
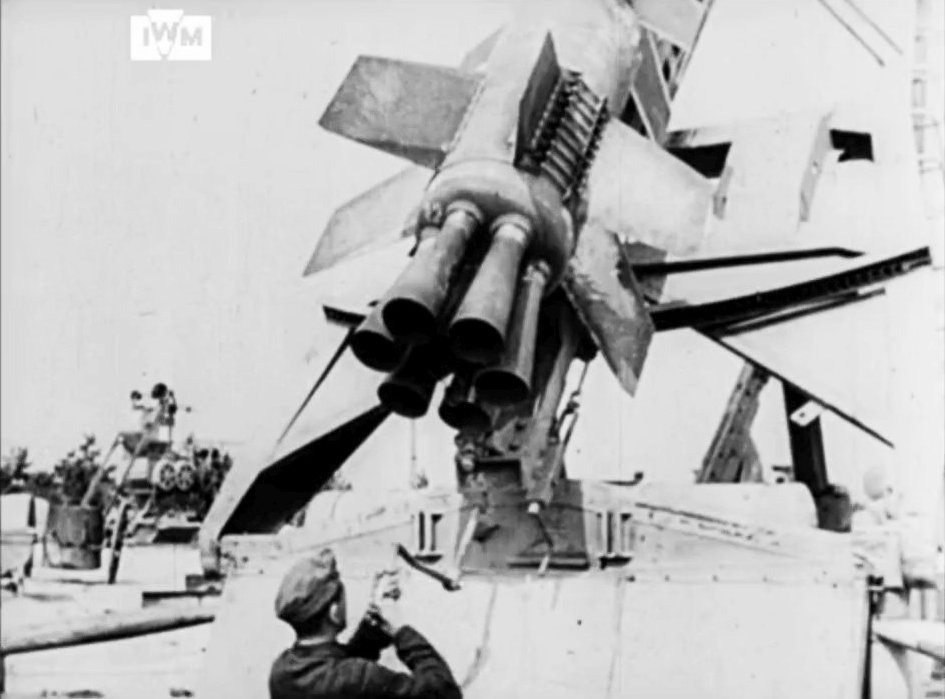
Detail of the booster stage of a Rheinbote sitting on a modified Meillerwagen (1944)

=== Airframe and stages ===
The Rheinbote was a four-stage solid-fuel rocket. The missile sacrificed payload capacity in order to achieve long range with the solid-fuel propulsion technology then available. The complete missile is usually given as 11.4 m (37 ft 5 in) long, with a maximum diameter of 535 mm (21.1 in). Hölsken gives the operational Rh Z 61/9 version as 11.70 m (38 ft 5 in) long and 1,650 kg (3,640 lb) in weight, while other sources give a launch weight of approximately 1,715 kg (3,781 lb).

The stages were nested into one another rather than simply attached end to end. Each stage was fin-stabilised and the rear fins were larger because the forward fins could initially interfere with stability. All stages had six stabilising fins arranged radially or star-like around the body. The first booster stage was 1.895–1.985 m (6 ft 2.6 in – 6 ft 6.1 in) long, 535 mm (1 ft 9.1 in) in diameter and weighed about 695 kg (1,532 lb). It contained approximately 245 kg (540 lb) of black-powder propellant and burned for about one second, producing approximately 372.6 kN (83,800 lbf) of thrust. It had six exhaust nozzles and six trapezoidal stabilising fins with a span of 1,460 mm (57 in). The second stage weighed 425 kg (937 lb) and the third stage weighed 395 kg (871 lb). Both were about 3.5 m (11 ft 6 in) long and 268 mm (10.6 in) in diameter. Each used approximately 140 kg (310 lb) of a solid propellant mixture based on diethylene glycol dinitrate and flash-powder components. Their burn time was about five seconds, with a thrust of approximately 54.9 kN (12,300 lbf) and each had a single nozzle and six stabilising fins. The fourth stage was approximately 4 m (13 ft 1 in) long, 19 cm (7.5 in) in diameter and weighed about 160 kg (350 lb). It used around 60 kg (130 lb) of similar propellant and produced approximately 33.3 kN (7,500 lbf) of thrust for about 3.5 seconds. The final stage remained attached to the warhead until impact, raising the striking mass to 140 kg (310 lb).

=== Warhead and fuze ===
The warhead was mounted above the fourth stage behind an ogival nose. It weighed 40 kg (88 lb) and contained approximately 25 kg (55 lb) of explosive, usually given as Amatol. The warhead used an EI. A. Z. 631 impact fuze. Wartime reports show that the fuze remained under development into January and February 1945, including work on a heat-activated safety switch and later an ampoule-type electrical element supplied by Mende of Dresden. Development of the fuze was later transferred in part to Sachsenwerk AG at Radeberg.

=== Launcher and aiming ===
The missile was launched from either a modified Meillerwagen or a modified 8.8 cm Flak 41 mounting. The modified Meillerwagen, later redesignated Raketenstartbahngeschütz 65 or RSBG 65, was fitted with a launch guide rail, hydraulic elevation equipment and limited traverse. The missile was secured to this rail by two sliding shoes. The launcher could be driven into a firing position with the missile already mounted and each launcher carried a crane for loading. Assembly of the stages and preparation of the fuze could take about one hour. The heavy smoke generated during launch made concealment difficult and encouraged rapid displacement of firing units after launch.

Range was adjusted by changing the elevation of the launch rail. Elevation was set by the Meillerwagen's hydraulic raising mechanism, while lateral correction was made by turning the entire vehicle. For a maximum range of about 220 km (140 mi), the launch rail was set at approximately 65 degrees. For a range of about 160 km (99 mi), the angle was about 75 degrees. The launcher elevation range was from 12 to 90 degrees and the traverse was 500 mils, roughly 28 degrees. This crude aiming method, combined with oscillation of the support arm under launch loads, greatly increased dispersion. At maximum range a lateral deviation of more than 20 km (12 mi) from the target point had to be expected.

=== Flight profile and accuracy ===
The missile was fired electrically from a cable-connected control position at a safe distance. When a lower stage burned out, a clockwork timing device triggered a pyrotechnic transfer charge, consisting of flash powder and nitroglycerin, which ignited a primer cartridge containing black powder and thermite; this in turn ignited the main propellant charge of the next stage. The exhaust from the newly ignited stage then separated it from the spent stage behind it. The successive stage ignitions occurred at approximately 2, 12 and 22 seconds after launch. The missile had no guidance system and relied entirely on fin stabilisation and ballistic flight. The launch stage burned for one second and fell away after about 3 km (1.9 mi) of flight. The second and third stages were identical, each burning for about five seconds and separating after about 12 km (7.5 mi) and 22 km (14 mi), respectively. The fourth stage burned for 3.5 seconds, accelerating the missile to about 1,300 m/s (4,700 km/h; 2,900 mph) and remained attached to the warhead until impact. At the end of the powered phase, the missile was about 10 km (6.2 mi) from the launch point and at an altitude of about 14 km (8.7 mi). The remaining flight was ballistic. At maximum range of about 220 km (140 mi), covered in approximately 260 seconds, the missile reportedly reached a maximum trajectory altitude of 78 km (48 mi), while a steeper trajectory at 160 km (99 mi) range could reach about 105 km (65 mi).

Stage fall zones had to be considered when selecting the direction of fire. One wartime report gave approximate fall distances of 4 km (2.5 mi), 6 km (3.7 mi) and 22 km (14 mi) for the spent stages, while the later technical account gives similar danger zones of about 3.5 km (2.2 mi), 12 km (7.5 mi) and 25 km (16 mi).

Reported speeds vary from 1,520–1,640 m/s (5,500–5,900 km/h; 3,400–3,700 mph; Mach 4.5 – Mach 4.8). Test reports cited in later secondary sources credit the missile with speeds approaching 6,800 km/h (4,200 mph; Mach 5.6).

Accuracy was poor. German sources give a circular error probable or dispersion radius of approximately 3–6 km (1.9–3.7 mi). The Nunspeet firings indicate that practical operational error could be far greater, since the launch setting used for Antwerp gave a mean range of about 230 km (140 mi) rather than the intended 165 km (103 mi). Upon detonation on sandy ground, the warhead generally produced only a small crater, approximately 1.2–1.5 m (3.9–4.9 ft) deep and 1.5–4 m (4.9–13.1 ft) in diameter.

=== Projected variants ===
Proposed follow-on designs, known as Rheinbote II and Rheinbote III, remained project studies. Rheinbote II was projected to carry a 200 kg (440 lb) payload to about 210 km (130 mi), although the theoretical work was discontinued after Rheinbote I had demonstrated ranges in excess of 220 km (140 mi).

Rheinbote III was a much larger projected missile intended to compete more directly with the V-2 role. It was projected to weigh about 8 t (8.8 short tons) and to deliver about 785 kg (1,731 lb) of explosive to approximately 250 km (160 mi). The proposal envisaged about 3,320 kg (7,320 lb) of propellant, a 30 t (33 short tons) launcher transported in two loads and emplacement in about two hours. The design was not built.

== Specifications ==
Published specifications for Rheinbote vary slightly, especially for length, launch weight, maximum speed and effective range. The following list summarises the principal figures reported in the main secondary sources. Ranges are used where the sources differ.

- Primary function: long-range artillery support
- Contractor: Rheinmetall-Borsig
- Alternative designations: Rh Z 61/9; Raketen-Sprenggranate 4831; R Spr Gr 4831; V-4
- Code name: Meteor
- Fuel source: solid rocket propellant; first stage: black powder; upper stages: diethylene glycol dinitrate-based solid propellant
- Length: 11.4 m (37 ft 5 in) to 11.70 m (38 ft 5 in)
- Diameter: 535 mm (21.1 in) maximum
- Maximum fin span: 1,460 mm (57 in)
- Launch weight: 1,715 kg (3,781 lb)
- Speed: 1,520–1,640 m/s (5,500–5,900 km/h; 3,400–3,700 mph; Mach 4.5 – Mach 4.8)
- Warhead: 40 kg (88 lb), containing about 20–30 kg (44–66 lb) of explosive
- Impacting mass: about 140 kg (310 lb), including the final stage
- Range: 160 km (99 mi) effective; 220–230 km (140–140 mi) maximum or observed mean range in later tests
- Maximum altitude: about 78–105 km (48–65 mi), depending on trajectory
- Guidance: none; fin-stabilised ballistic flight
- Stabilisation: six radial fins on each stage
- CEP: approximately 3–6 km (1.9–3.7 mi) in German estimates; much larger practical error in the Nunspeet firing
- Fuze: EI. A. Z. 631 impact fuze
- Launch platform: modified Meillerwagen, RSBG 65 launch rail or modified 8.8 cm Flak 41 mounting
- Unit cost: about 5,000–5,500 Reichsmark
- Date deployed: December 1944
- Users: Nazi Germany

== See also ==
- List of World War II guided missiles of Germany
- List of World War II weapons of Germany
- V-1 flying bomb
- V-2 rocket
- Rheintochter

== Sources ==
- Ankerstjerne, Christian (2022). "German Equipment Names". Panzerworld. Archived from the original on 24 September 2022.
- "V4". Bunker Museum Antwerpen.
- Boog, Horst; Krebs, Gerhard; Vogel, Detlef (2006). The Strategic Air War in Europe and the War in the West and East Asia, 1943–1944/5 (PDF). Germany and the Second World War. Vol. VII. Oxford: Clarendon Press. ISBN 978-0-19-822889-9.
- Batenburg, C. (2008). "Het geheime wapen in de Soerelse bossen" [The secret weapon in the Soerelse Woods]. Mothoek (in Dutch). Vol. 24, no. 4. pp. 148–150. Archived from the original on 2019-08-25.
- Christopher, John (2013). The Race for Hitler's X-Planes: Britain's 1945 Mission to Capture Secret Luftwaffe Technology. Stroud: History Press. ISBN 978-0-7524-8970-4.
- "Rakete Rheinbote V4". Deutsche Luftwaffe (in German). 15 August 2015. Archived from the original on 15 August 2015.
- Ford, Brian J. (2011). Secret Weapons: Technology, Science and the Race to Win World War II. Oxford: Osprey Publishing. ISBN 978-1-84908-390-4.
- Gander, Terry; Chamberlain, Peter (1979). Weapons of the Third Reich: An Encyclopedic Survey of All Small Arms, Artillery and Special Weapons of the German Land Forces 1939–1945. New York: Doubleday. ISBN 0-385-15090-3.
- Georg, Friedrich (2009). Hitlers letzter Trumpf: Entwicklung und Verrat der Wunderwaffen (in German). Vol. 2. Grabert. ISBN 978-3-87847-248-3.
- Hahn, Fritz (1986). Waffen und Geheimwaffen des deutschen Heeres 1933–1945 (in German). Vol. 2. Koblenz: Bernard & Graefe.
- Henshall, Philip (2002). Hitler's V-Weapons and Their Launching Sites. Stroud: Sutton Publishing. ISBN 978-0-7509-2607-2.
- Hogg, Ian V. (1997). German Secret Weapons of the Second World War. London: Greenhill Books. ISBN 1-85367-324-2.
- Hölsken, Dieter (1985). "Die V-Waffen: Entwicklung und Einsatzgrundsätze". Militärgeschichtliche Mitteilungen (in German). 38 (2): 95–122. doi:10.1524/mgzs.1985.38.2.95.
- Johnson, David (2001). V-Weapons Hunt: Defeating German Secret Weapons. Conshohocken, Pennsylvania: Combined Publishing. ISBN 978-1-84884-259-5.
- Jodl, Alfred (1 February 1944). "Suggestivnamen für neue Waffen" (in German). Archived from the original on 25 January 2022.
- Kens, Karlheinz; Nowarra, Heinz J. (1972). Die deutschen Flugzeuge 1933–1945: Deutschlands Luftfahrt-Entwicklungen bis zum Ende des Zweiten Weltkrieges (in German). München: J. F. Lehmann. ISBN 978-3-469-00405-5.
- Klein, Heinrich (1977). Vom Geschoss zum Feuerpfeil: Der grosse Umbruch der Waffentechnik in Deutschland, 1900–1970 (in German). Neckargemünd: Motorbuch Verlag.
- Koopman, Henk (2018). Vergeltungswaffen in Nederland: inzet van de V1, V2 & V4 vanaf Nederlands grondgebied 1944–1945 (in Dutch). Utrecht: Flying Pencil. ISBN 9789081870221.
- Kotarski, Leszek (2018). "Klein Peenemünde: Stacja doświadczalna Łeba" (PDF). Explorator (in Polish). Vol. 6. pp. 21–29. ISSN 1233-3204.
- Ley, Willy (1968). Rockets, Missiles, and Men in Space. New York: Viking Press.
- Pallud, Jean-Paul (2001). "The Secret Weapons: V3 and V4". After the Battle. 114: 2–29. ISSN 0306-154X.
- Pawlas, Karl R. (1992). "Fernzielrakete Rh Z 61/9 "Rheinbote"". Waffen Revue (in German). 84. Schwäbisch Hall: Journal Verlag Schwend: 53–82.
- Piszkiewicz, Dennis (1995). The Nazi Rocketeers: Dreams of Space and Crimes of War. Westport, Connecticut: Praeger. ISBN 978-0-8117-3387-8.
- "Division z.V. (zur Vergeltung)". Lexikon der Wehrmacht (in German).
