= BMW 109-558 =

1940s German aircraft rocket engine

109-558
- Type: Liquid-propellant rocket (sustainer)
- National origin: Germany
- Manufacturer: BMW
- Major applications: Henschel Hs 117 Schmetterling missile
- Number built: 120

The BMW 109-558 is a liquid fuelled sustainer rocket motor developed by BMW at their Bruckmühl facility, in Germany during the Second World War.

The 109-558 (with the "109-" prefix being the Reichsluftfahrtministerium, or RLM, designation for reaction-propulsion aircraft power projects, encompassing all jet & rocket engine designs) was designed as a sustainer rocket for the Henschel Hs 117 surface-to-air missile. It was tubular, measuring 12.5 cm (4.9 in) diameter and about 46 cm (18 in) long overall. The engine had a compressed air tank to pressurise tanks for the R-Stoff fuel (50% triethylamine and 50% xylidine) and SV-Stoff oxidiser (94% nitric acid with 6% dinitrogen tetroxide). SV-Stoff was used to cool the combustion chamber.

The 109-558 was capable of propelling an Hs 117 at 900–1,000 km/h (560–620 mph; 490–540 kn), with throttle control by sliding valves in the exhaust nozzle, operated by a servomotor controlled by a Mach sensor. Production of the 109-558 took forty to sixty hours using a very high proportion of slave labour.

== Applications ==
- Henschel Hs 117
- Henschel Hs 117H

== Specifications ==
==== General characteristics ====
- Type: liquid-fuelled rocket engine
- Length: 2,400 mm (7 ft 10 in)
- Diameter: 1,250 mm (49 in)
- Dry weight: 160 kg (350 lb).

==== Components ====
- Compressor:
- Combustors: Hypergolic combustion in a single combustion chamber
- Fuel type: R-Stoff fuel (50% triethylamine and 50% xylidine) and SV-Stoff oxidiser (94% nitric acid with 6% dinitrogen tetroxide)

==== Performance ====
- Maximum thrust: 3.7 kN (830 lbf) for 33 s, followed by 0.588 kN (132 lbf) for 24 s
- Thrust-to-weight ratio: 0.023125 kN/kg (2.36 lbf/lb)

== Sources ==
- Christopher, John. The Race for Hitler's X-Planes. The Mill, Gloucestershire: History Press, 2013.
