= Taifun (rocket) =

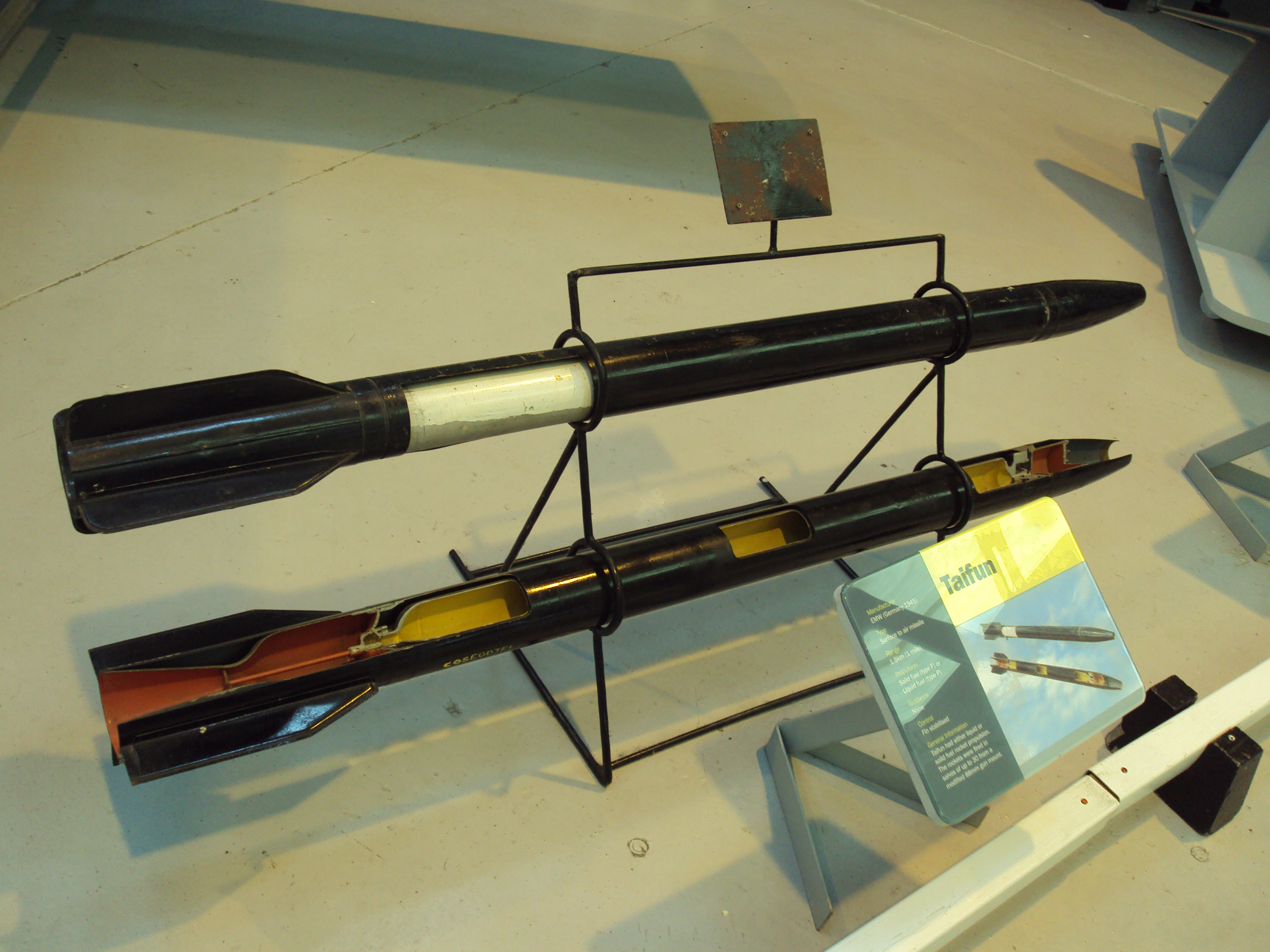
- Two "Taifun" rockets displayed at RAF museum Cosford
- Type: Unguided anti-aircraft rocket
- Place of origin: Germany

Production history
- Manufacturer: Flak-Versuchskommando Nord, EMW Peenemünde
- Produced: January–May 1945
- No. built: Approx 600

Specifications (Taifun F)
- Mass: 21 kg (46 lb) at launch
- Length: 1.93 m (6 ft 4 in)
- Diameter: 10 cm (3.9 in)
- Warhead: High Explosive
- Warhead weight: 500 g (1.1 lb)
- Detonation mechanism: Contact Fuze
- Propellant: Hypergolic Liquid
- Flight ceiling: 15,000 meters (50,000ft)
- Boost time: 2.5 secs
- Maximum speed: >3,300 km/h (2,100 mph) (Obtained)
- Launch platform: Modified 8.8 cm Flak 18/36/37/41

Taifun (German for "typhoon") was a German World War II anti-aircraft unguided rocket system. Waves of small, relatively cheap, Taifun flak rockets were to be launched en masse into Allied bomber formations. Although never deployed operationally, the Taifun was further developed in the US as the 76mm HEAA T220 "Loki" Rocket.

== Design and development ==
Development of the Taifun project started towards the end of 1944. Klaus Scheufelen, an officer at Peenemünde, had been working on the Wasserfall guided missile but had become dissatisfied with the project's complexity and proposed a cheap unguided rocket as an alternative. Designs were submitted to the Ministry of Aviation in September 1944 with Scheufelen named as the administrative officer in charge of development.

The Taifun proposal was developed by a small team at Peenemünde and its manufacturing arm (the Electromechanische Werke in Karlshagen). Their design was a 1.93 m (6 ft 4 in) long, spin stabilized unguided rocket with four small fins at the base. The rockets were fired from either a 30 or 50 barrel launcher mounted on an adapted 88 mm gun mounting.

The rocket was driven by a liquid fueled engine. The liquid propellant used was a hypergolic mixture consisting of an Oxidizer and a Fuel. Salbei (Red Fuming Nitric Acid) oxidizer was mixed with a Visol (Vinyl Ether) based fuel (some sources give the fuel as Tonka 250 or Dibutyl Ether). The fuel and oxidizer were fed into the combustion chamber under pressure. The pressure was provided by small cordite charges fired into the fuel tanks, in the process bursting a pair of thin diaphragms to allow the fuel and oxidizer to flow into the combustion chamber, propelling the rocket.

A solid propellant version of the Taifun, called the Wirbelsturm (German for "Tornado"), was designed in parallel with the liquid fueled models but was not put into production. Post war, the unbuilt solid propellant version was used as the basis of design for the Soviet R-103 and R-110 unguided surface-to-air rockets.

The Taifun's nose was fitted with a contact fuze. One of the two contact fuze designs, developed by Mende Radio of Dresden, used a condenser, charged by the ionization of the exhaust gas stream, discharging through a tube in rocket's nose, the other, developed by Rheinmetall-Borsig used a conventional impact fuze design. A timed self destruct fuze was fitted to the rear of the Taifun to destroy the rocket if it failed to hit a target. The Taifun's developers believed contact fuzes were superior to time fuzes against large bombers flying in formation (a view widely held among German flak specialists).

Production began in January 1945. More than 600 of an initial batch of 10,000 were completed by VE day. No Taifun rockets were deployed operationally.

== Survivors ==
Two Taifun rockets are displayed at the Royal Air Force Museum Cosford, UK.

== See also ==
- Henschel Hs 297 / 7.3 cm Föhn-Gerät – a WW2 German anti-aircraft rocket launcher.
- Z battery – British WW2 3-inch land-based anti-aircraft rocket launcher
- 76mm HEAA T220 "Loki" Rocket – An American post war development of the Taifun
