= Henschel Hs 298 =

German WWII air-to-air missile

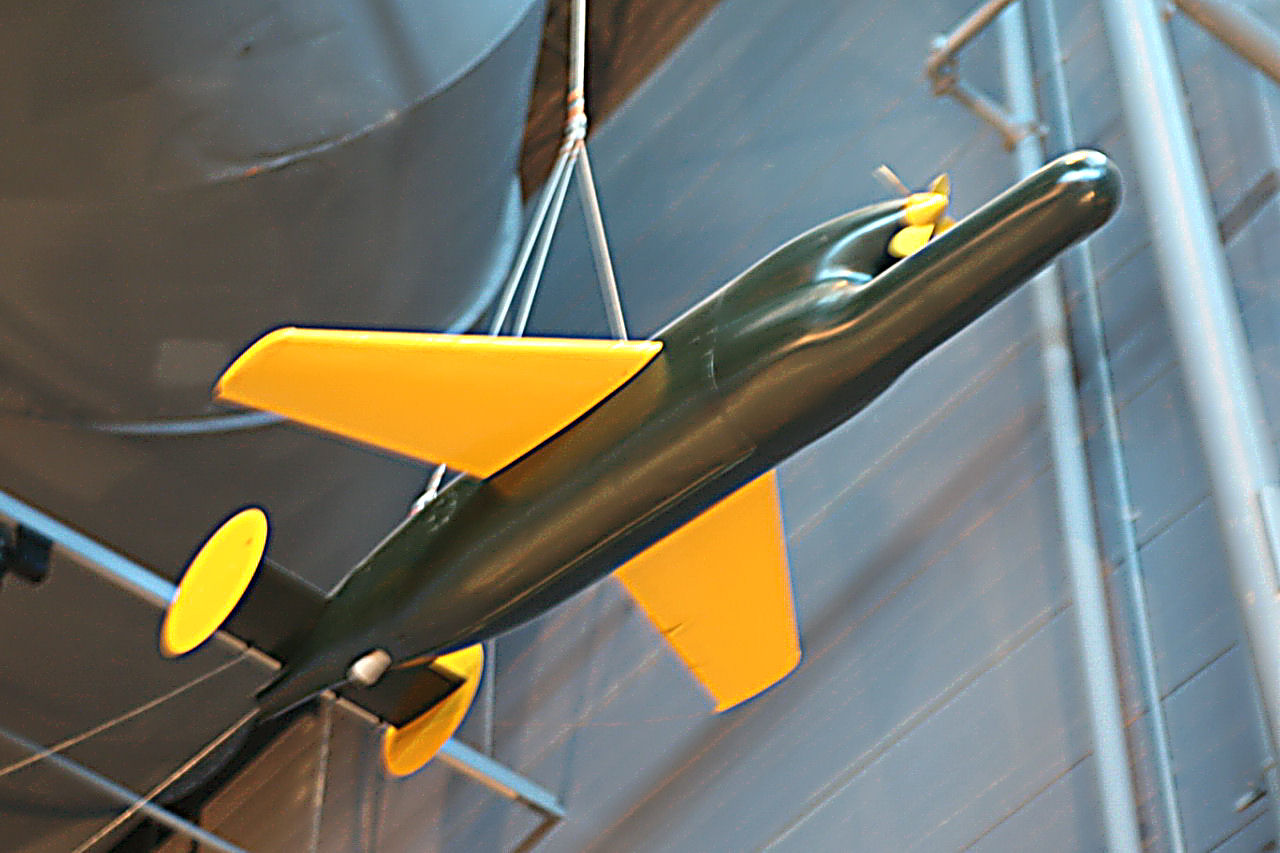

General information
- Type: Rocket-powered air-to-air missile
- National origin: Germany
- Manufacturer: Henschel
- Designer: Herbert A. Wagner

History
- First flight: 22 December 1944

The Henschel Hs 298 was a 1940s German rocket-powered air-to-air missile designed by Professor Herbert Wagner of Henschel.

== Design and development ==
The Hs 298 was designed specifically to attack Allied bomber aircraft and was the first missile designed specifically for air-to-air use. It was to be carried on special launch rails by Dornier Do 217s (five missiles) or Focke-Wulf Fw 190s (two missiles) and carried 48 kg (106 lb) of explosive, slightly more than the 40.8 kg warheads carried by unguided BR 21 heavy-calibre air-launched rockets in use from the spring of 1943 onwards.

The Hs 298 was a mid-wing monoplane with tapered swept back wings and it had a single horizontal stabiliser with twin vertical fins. It was powered by a Henschel-designed rocket motor built by Schmidding as the 109–543; it had two stages, the first high velocity stage was designed to leave the launch aircraft at 938 km/h (585 mph), in the second stage the speed was brought back to 682 km/h (425 mph) to give a maximum range of about 1.5 km (0.93 mi). It used a Kehl-Straßburg MCLOS radio guidance system (the Funkgerät FuG 203-series Kehl transmitter in the launching aircraft, the FuG 230 Straßburg receiver in the ordnance) powered by a propeller-driven (mounted on the nose) electric generator. The missile needed two crew on the launch aircraft to control it, one operator used a reflector-type sight to aim at the target and the other flew the missile using a joystick on the Kehl transmitter, and another sight paired to the first with a servo system.

The only known test firings were carried out on 22 December 1944 with three missiles carried by a Junkers Ju 88G. Only two missiles left the launch rails with one failing to release, of the two released one exploded prematurely and nose-dived into the ground. It was planned to enter mass production in January 1945 but the project was abandoned in favour of the X-4.

== Survivors ==
One Hs 298 is on display at the Royal Air Force Museum Cosford. One Hs 298 is on display at the Smithsonian National Air and Space Museum Steven F. Udvar-Hazy Center.

== Specifications ==
- Wing span – 1.24m (4 ft 1in)
- Length – 2.06m (6 ft 9in)
- Launch weight – 120 kg (265 lb)
- Launch speed – 938 km/h (585 mph)
- Cruise speed – 682 km/h (425 mph)
