= Henschel Hs 117 =

Hs 117 Schmetterling
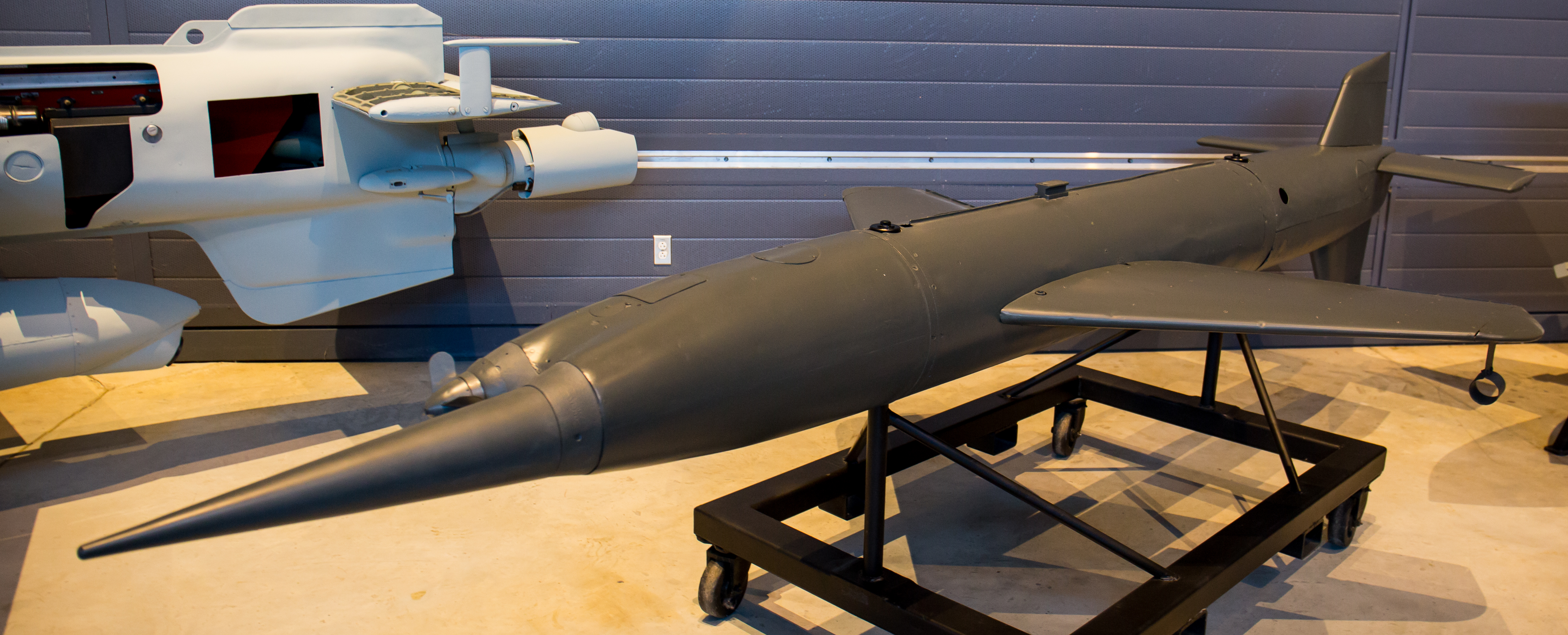
- A Schmetterling missile on display at the National Air and Space Museum (NASM), Steven F. Udvar-Hazy Center.
- Type: Surface-to-air (SAM) / Air-to-air (AAM) missile
- Place of origin: Germany

Production history
- Designer: Herbert A. Wagner
- Designed: 1942-1943
- Manufacturer: Henschel Flugzeugwerke
- Variants: Hs 117H (air-to-air missile variant)

Specifications (Hs 117)
- Mass: 450 kg (990 lb), 620 kg (1,370 lb) with launch boosters
- Length: 4,200 mm (170 in)
- Diameter: 350 mm (14 in)
- Wingspan: 2,000 mm (79 in)
- Warhead: High explosive
- Engine: 1x BMW 109-558 liquid-fuelled rocket engine 3.7 kN (830 lbf) for 33 sec, followed by 0.588 kN (132 lbf) for 24 sec
- Propellant: Tonka-250 (50% triethylamine and 50% xylidine) fuel, with SV-Stoff (nitric acid) oxidiser
- Operational range: 32 km (20 mi; 17 nmi)
- Flight altitude: 6,000–9,000 m (20,000–30,000 ft)
- Boost time: 2x Schmidding 109-553 Ethylene glycol solid fuel boosters, giving total 17.1 kN (3,800 lbf) thrust for 4 sec.
- Maximum speed: 900–1,000 km/h (560–620 mph; 490–540 kn)
- Guidance system: MCLOS; visual guidance by telescope, radio controls; two-man crew

The Henschel Hs 117 Schmetterling (German for Butterfly) was a radio-guided German surface-to-air missile project developed during World War II. There was also an air-to-air version, the Hs 117H.

The operators used a telescopic sight and a joystick to guide the missile by radio control, which was detonated by acoustic and photoelectric proximity fuses, at 10–20 m (33–66 ft).

== Development ==
In 1941, Professor Herbert A. Wagner (who was previously responsible for the Henschel Hs 293 anti-ship missile) invented the Schmetterling missile and submitted it to the Reich Air Ministry (RLM), who rejected the design because there was no need for more anti-aircraft weaponry.

However, by 1943 the large-scale bombing of Germany caused the RLM to change its mind, and Henschel was given a contract to develop and manufacture it. The team was led by Professor Wagner, and it produced a weapon somewhat resembling a bottlenose dolphin with swept wings and cruciform tail.

In May 1944, 59 Hs 117 missiles were tested, some from beneath a Heinkel He 111; over half the trials failed. Mass production was ordered in December 1944, with deployment to start in March 1945. Operational missiles were to be launched from a 37mm gun carriage.

In January 1945, a prototype for mass production was completed, and production of 3,000 missiles a month was anticipated, but on 6 February, SS-Obergruppenführer Hans Kammler cancelled the project.

== Variants ==
The Hs 117H was an air-launched variant, designed to be launched from a Dornier Do 217, Junkers Ju 188, or Junkers Ju 388. This version was designed to attack enemy aircraft up to 5 km (16,000 ft) above the launching aircraft.

== See also ==
- Henschel Hs 293
- Wasserfall
- Enzian
- Rheintochter

Related lists

- List of surface-to-air missiles
- List of German guided weapons of World War II
