= Enzian =

World War II German surface-to-air missile

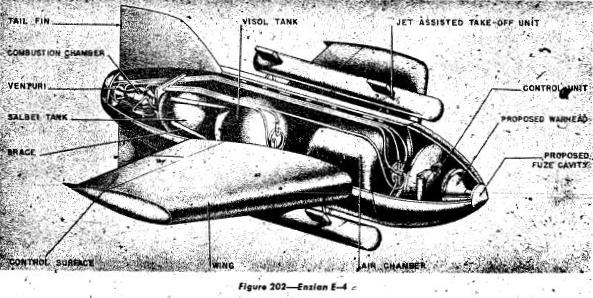
Messerschmitt "Enzian" E-4

The Enzian was a German WWII surface-to-air anti-aircraft missile that was the first to use a radio controlled guidance system. During the missile's development in the late stages of the war it was plagued by organisational problems and was cancelled before becoming operational.

It was named for a genus of mountain flower, in English the gentian.

== Development ==
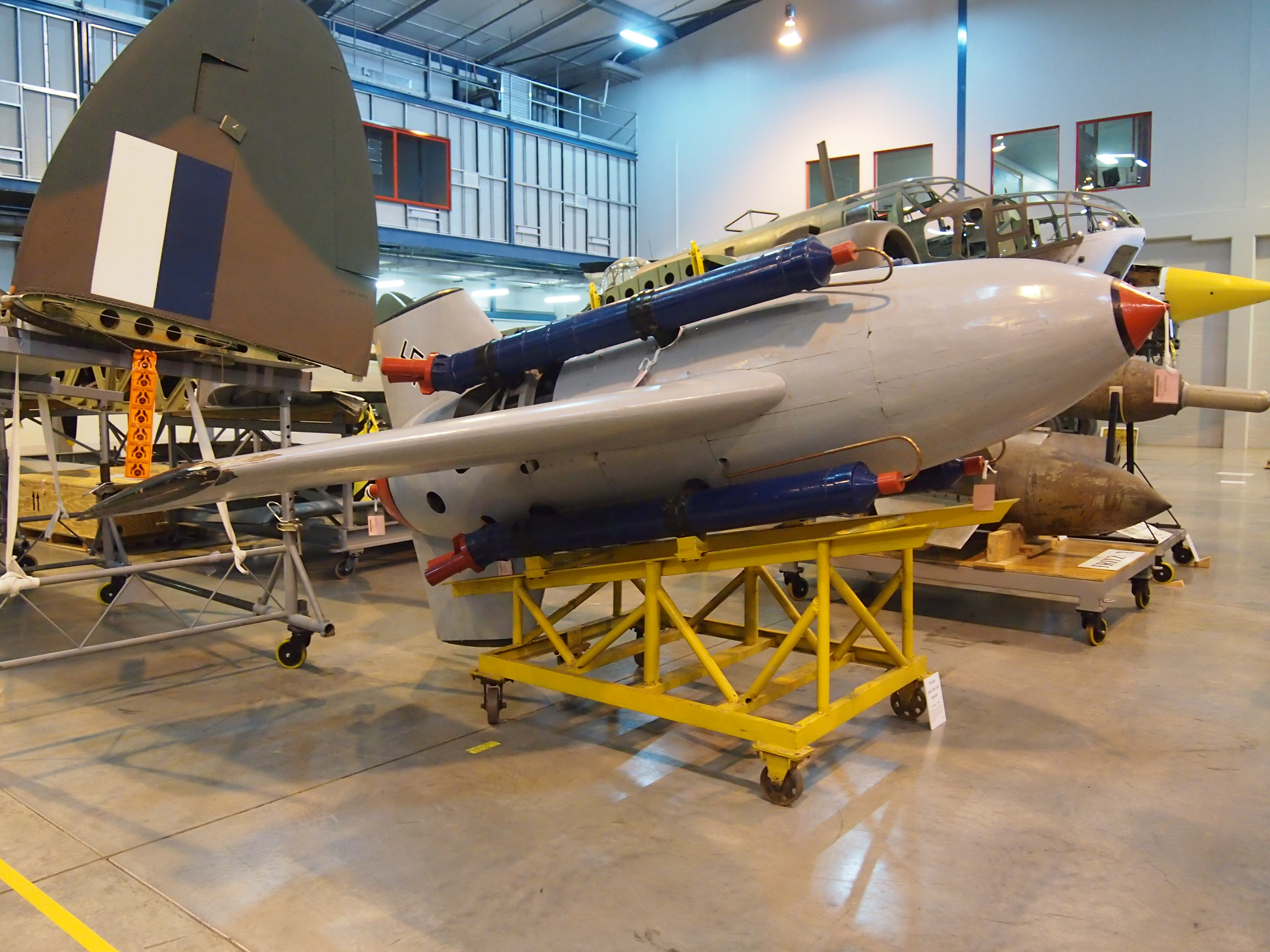
The Australian War Memorial's Enzian missile in 2012

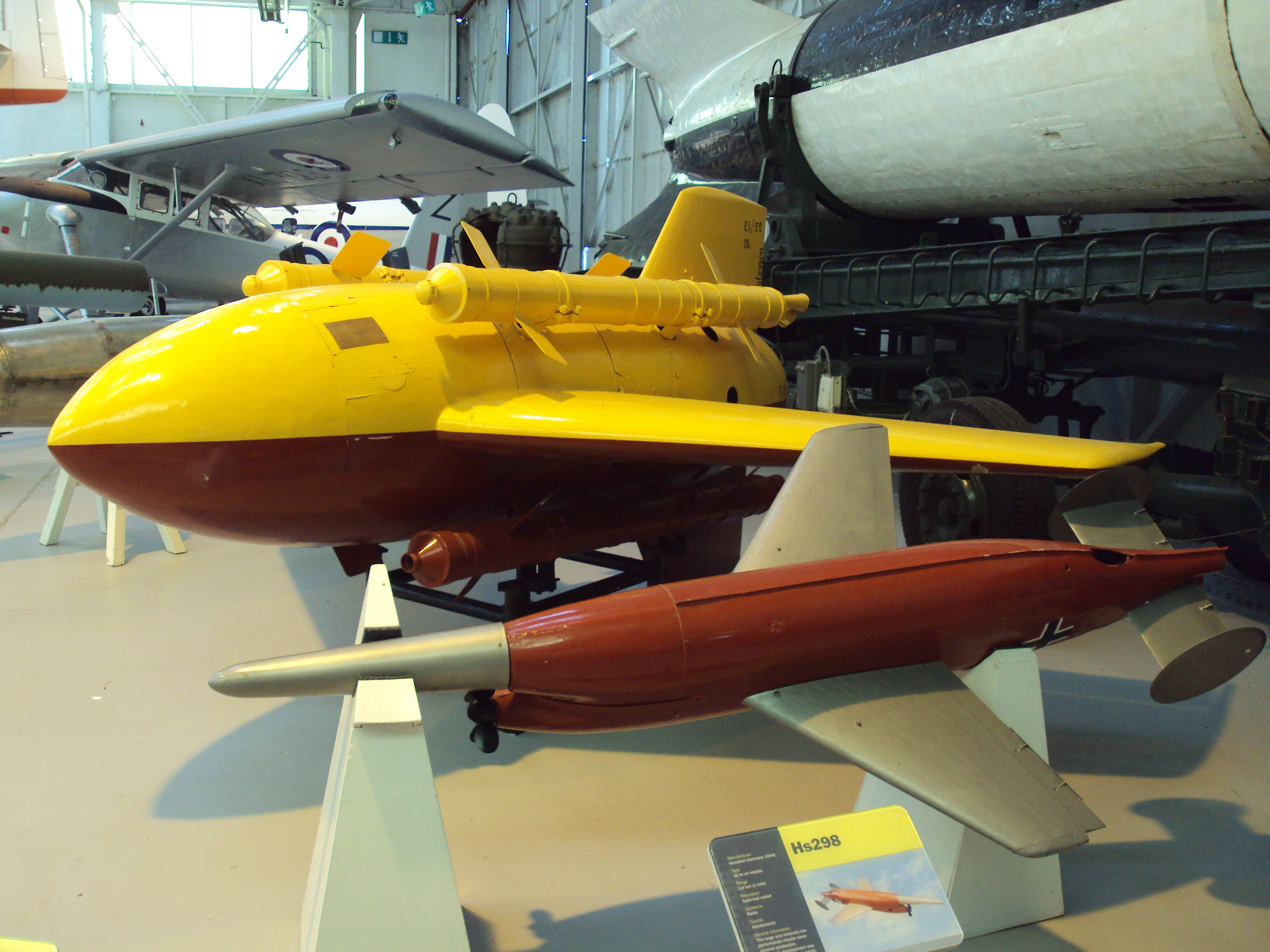
Messerschmitt "Enzian" missile (at the background in yellow and red) displayed at RAF museum Cosford

As early as 1943 it was becoming clear that Messerschmitt's Me 163 interceptor would be difficult to use in combat. After flying to the 25,000–30,000 ft (7,600–9,100 m) altitude of allied bombers, it had only a few minutes to find them and make an attack before running out of fuel. Even if the aircraft did accomplish this, it then had the additional problem of lacking a weapon that could be aimed effectively while closing on the target at some 400 mph (640 km/h; 350 kn).

Dr. Herman Wurster of Messerschmitt proposed an answer in the form of Flak Rakete 1 (FR-1) in 1943. Instead of tracking down the planes, the rocket would fly just in front of the target and then detonate a 500 kg (1,100 lb) warhead, in the hope of bringing down several bombers at once. With no human pilot on board, and thus no need to limit takeoff acceleration, the rocket could use solid fuel boosters (four Schmidding 109-553s, for a total of 7,000 kg (15,000 lb) of thrust, grouped around the exterior), reducing the amount of fuel needed for the rest of the climb by the sustainer motor, a Walther RI-10B. The liquid fueled sustainer used a combination of SV-Stoff and Br-Stoff (petrol), catalyzed by an amount of T-Stoff. The result, even with the heavy warhead, was that a much smaller airframe was needed to carry the required fuel – so small it could be portable and launched from a modified 88 mm gun mounting.

The design made as much use of wood as possible, due to the need to conserve other "strategic" materials in the rapidly deteriorating war situation. For the same reasons a new type of Walter rocket was envisioned, a modification of the engine in the Me 163 that would burn coal-gas (benzine) instead of the hydrogen peroxide used in other Walter designs (although a small amount of peroxide was used to drive the fuel pumps). Thrust was also reduced in flight, from 2,000 kg (4,409 lb) to 1,000 kg (2,205 lb).

The missile, which strongly resembled the Me 163 (with swept wings and elevons) would be guided primarily under radio control from the ground. The operator would fly the missile into the vicinity of the bombers, then cut the engine and let it glide. This presented a real problem in the Enzian. Other German missiles were high-speed designs that could be flown directly at their target along the line of sight, which is fairly straightforward even for an operator on the ground. The Enzian would instead be approaching its target from somewhere in front, which is considerably harder for the operator. Many experiments with radio and wire-guided missiles had demonstrated real problems with last-minute terminal guidance corrections.

The initial plans for solving this problem were rather advanced. The large airframe left plenty of room in the nose, which the designers intended to fill with a self-contained radar unit called Elsass. In the short term it was planned to use some sort of proximity fuze while flying the missile through the bomber stream. The warhead, of which several were studied, was to have a nominal lethal radius of 45 m (49 yd).

Several elaborations of the basic design were carried out, resulting in the FR-1 through FR-5. The FR-5 was considered to be a reasonable starting point, so development commenced on the newly named Enzian E.1 (and its engine) in September 1943. By May 1944, 60 airframes were complete, awaiting their engines. In order to gain flight test data they were fitted with RATO units instead.

A series of 38 flight tests commenced with generally favourable results, but the engine still lagged. Finally Dr. Konrad, the designer of the engine of the Rheintochter missile, was asked to modify his design for use in the Enzian. On consideration, it appeared this was a much better (and cheaper) solution anyway, and after January 1945 there were no plans to use the Walter design. The resulting E-4 version with the Konrad engine was considered the production version.

Because of difficulties in perfecting the proximity fuze, an infrared homing system, Madrid, was proposed, allowing Enzian to be flown right to the target. However the system was never actually developed beyond a test-bench mockup.

On 17 January 1945, all development projects were cancelled by the Luftwaffe in order to concentrate all possible efforts on only two designs, the Messerschmitt Me 262 and the Heinkel He 162. Although this was the official story, many in the Nazi and Luftwaffe hierarchy had their own pet projects continue. Enzian was judged further from completion than Henschel's Schmetterling missile, so it was cancelled. Messerschmitt engineers continued some low-level work on the project, hoping it would be re-funded, but by March it was clear the cancellation order would not be rescinded (although it had been for other designs) and all development efforts ceased.

== Survivors ==
Only two Enzian missiles are known to have survived the war. One is on display at the Royal Air Force Museum Cosford and the other is in storage at the Australian War Memorial's Treloar Resource Centre after being displayed for many years at the Royal Australian Air Force Museum.

== Cultural references ==
"Enzian" is the name of the foil character in Thomas Pynchon's Gravity's Rainbow, contrasted against the main character Slothrop's association with the V-2.

== See also ==
- List of World War II guided missiles of Germany
- AIM-9 Sidewinder
- List of missiles
