= Rheintochter =

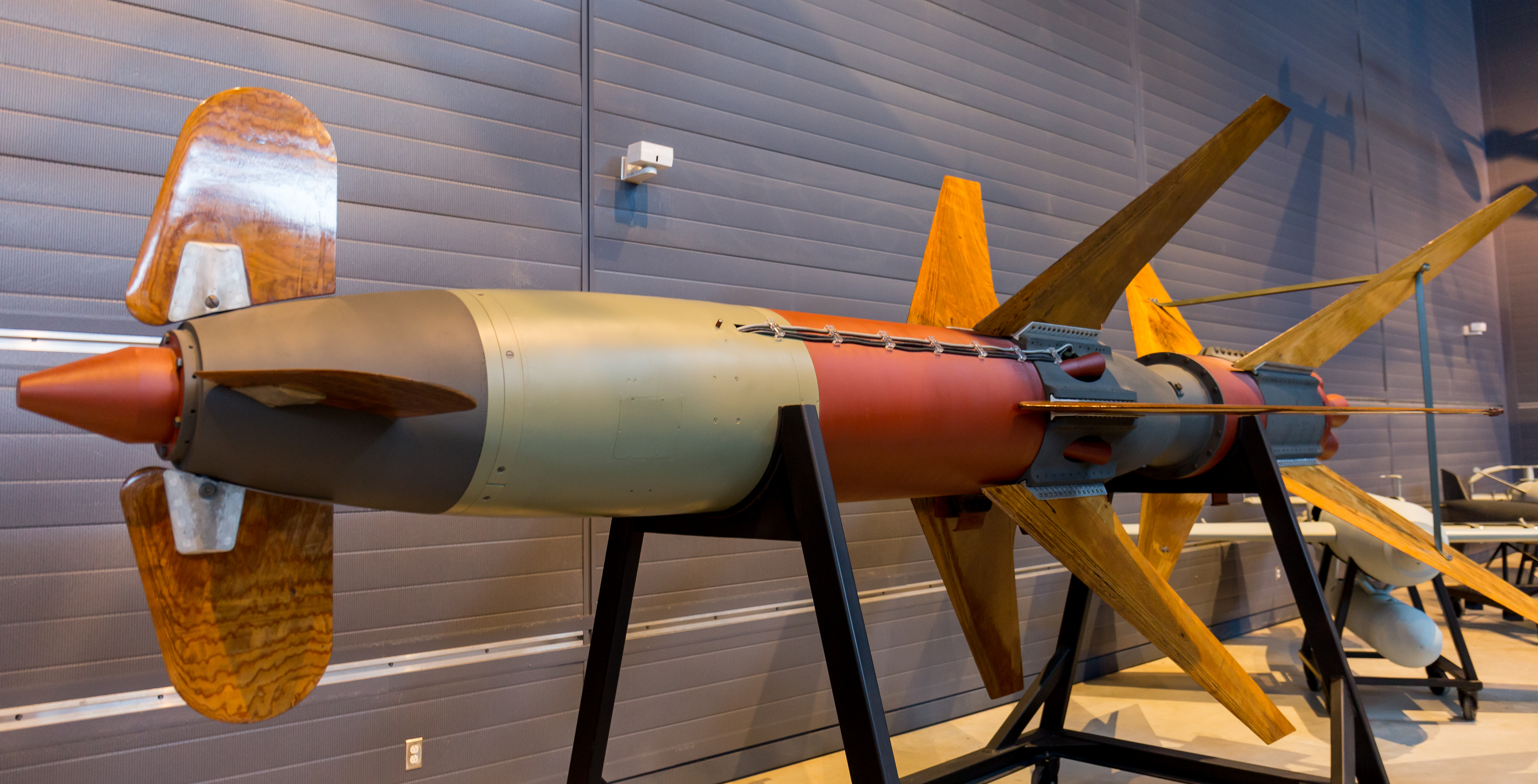
- A Rheintochter R1 missile on display at the Steven F. Udvar-Hazy Center
- Type: Surface-to-air missile
- Place of origin: Germany

Production history
- Designed: 1942-1943
- Manufacturer: Rheinmetall-Borsig

Specifications
- Length: 6.3 m (20 ft 8 in)
- Warhead weight: 136 kg (300 lb)
- Propellant: multi-stage solid fuel

Rheintochter was a German surface-to-air missile developed by Rheinmetall-Borsig during World War II. Its name comes from the mythical Rheintöchter (Rhinemaidens) of Richard Wagner's opera series Der Ring des Nibelungen.

The missile was a multi-stage solid fuelled rocket. It had four small varnished plywood control surfaces, resembling paddles, in the nose, six fins at the after end of the top stage, and four at the end of the main stage. It stood 6.3 m (20 ft 8 in) tall, with a diameter of 54 cm (1 ft 9 in). The sustainer motor, located ahead of the 136 kg (300 lb) warhead (rather than behind, as is more usual) exhausted through six venturis between the first stage fins.

== History ==
Rheintochter was ordered in November 1942 by the German army (Heer). Starting in August 1943, 82 test firings were made. An air-launched version was also designed. The operational version was intended to be fired from a ramp or converted gun mount.

The project was cancelled on 6 February 1945.

Examples are on display at the Steven F. Udvar-Hazy Center in Chantilly, Virginia, the Deutsches Museum in Munich, Air Defense Learning Annex at Fort Sill, OK and at the Royal Air Force Museum Midlands, UK.

== Variants ==
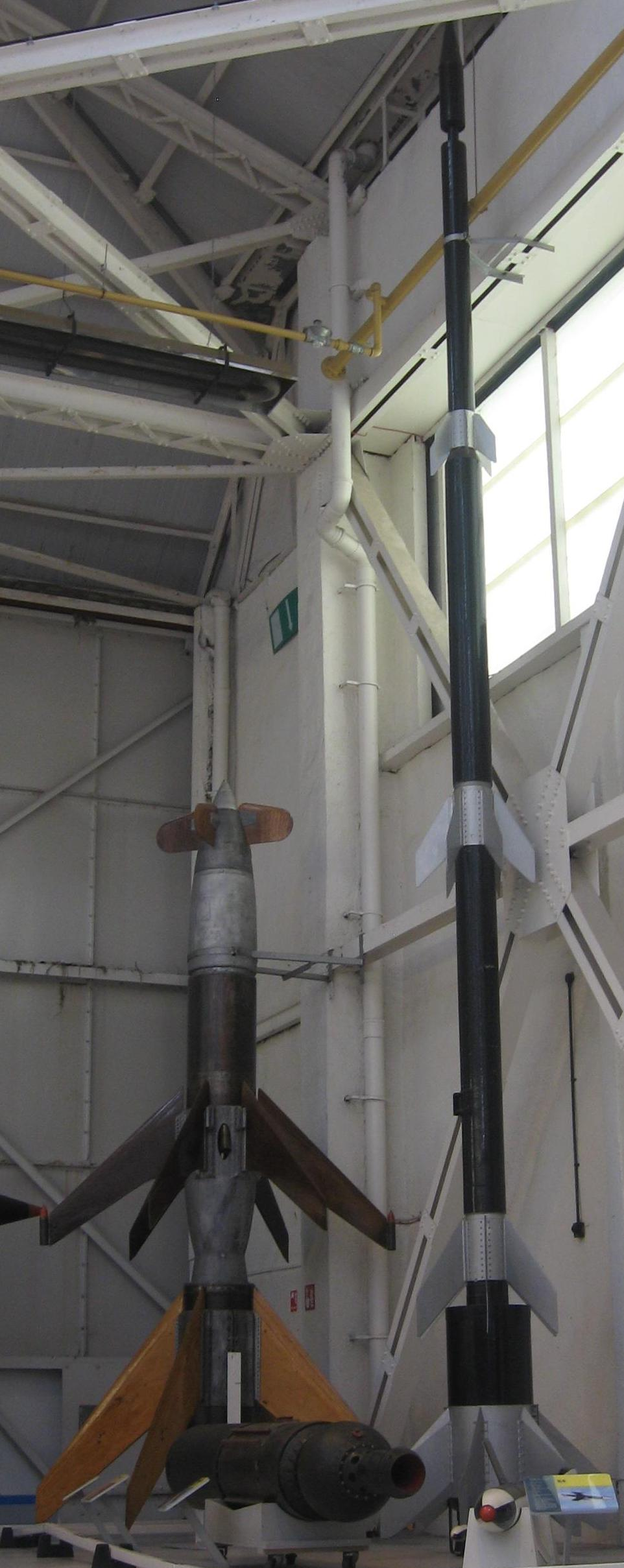
A Rheintochter R1 (left), and part of an R3 (centre), with a Rheinbote (right)

The initial R1 variant was powered by a two-stage solid-fuel rocket.

The proposed R2 did not offer any improvement over the R1, and was dropped in December 1944.

The R3 model was developed, which had a liquid fuel engine with solid-fuel boosters ("strap-ons"). Only six trial missiles were fired.

== Specifications ==
- Power plant: RI variant was 2-stage solid fuel; RIII was liquid fuel with solid-fuel boosters
- Length: 6.3 m (20 ft 8 in)
- Diameter: 54 cm (1 ft 9 in)
- Wing span: 2.65 m (8 ft 8 in)
- Launch weight: 1,748 kg (3,854 lb)
- Speed: 1,080 km/h (671 mph)
- Warhead: 136 kg (300 lb)
- Altitude: R1 8 km
- Guidance system: Radio Command

== See also ==
- List of World War II guided missiles of Germany
- Enzian

== Sources ==
- Christopher, John. The Race for Hitler's X-Planes. The Mill, Gloucestershire: History Press, 2013.
- Ford, Brian J., Secret Weapons, Osprey Publishing, 2011, ISBN 978 1 84908 390 4
