= Messerschmitt Me 262 variants =

Variants of the Messerschmitt Me 262

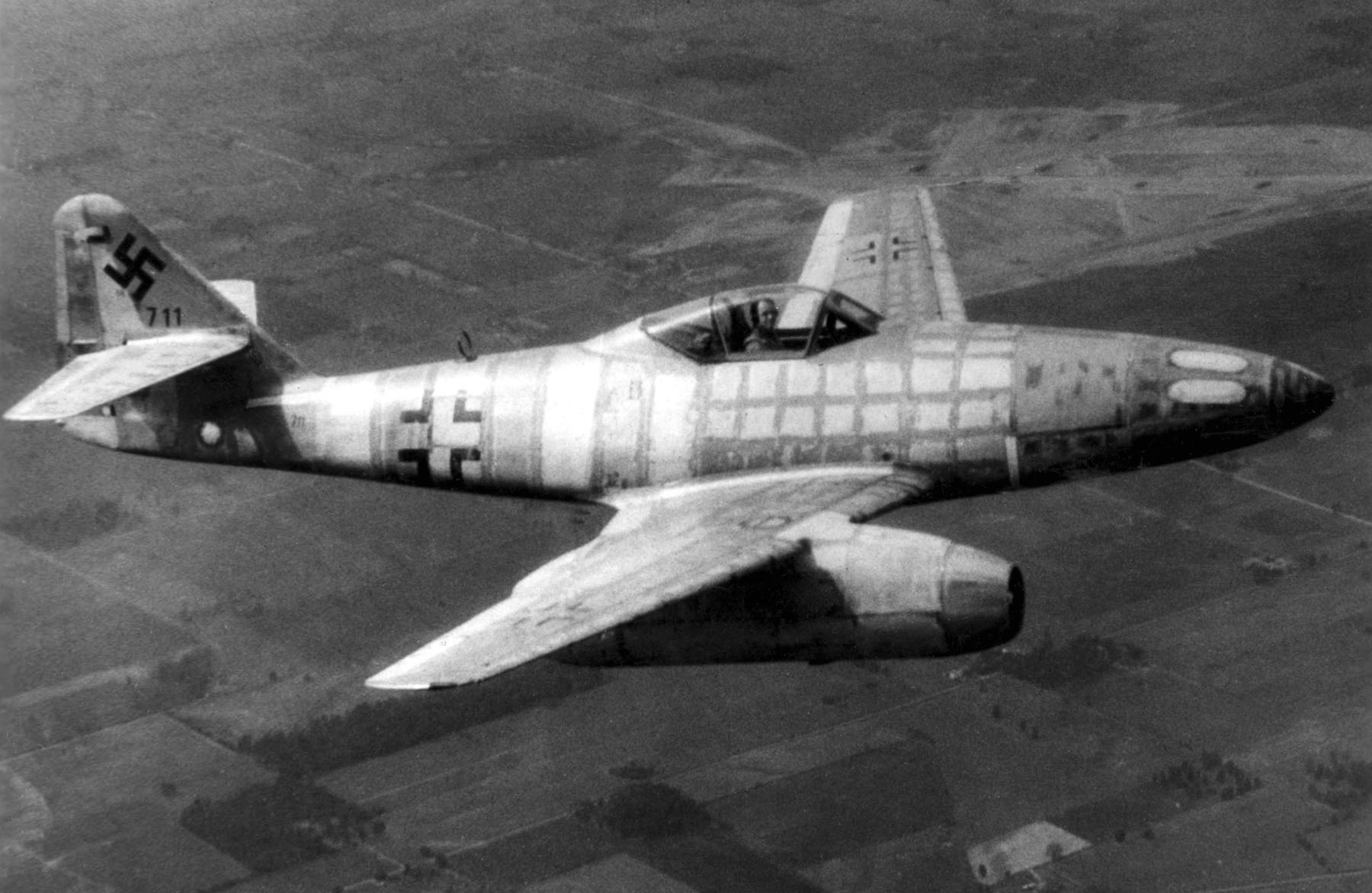
A captured Me 262A-1a undergoing evaluation in the United States.

The Messerschmitt Me 262 was a German World War II fighter aircraft built by Messerschmitt in the later stages of the war, and under license by Avia post-war.

== Prototypes ==
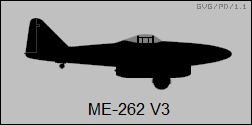
Me 262 V3

Messerschmitt began work on a single-seat jet-powered fighter before the start of World War II. The initial design was known as Projekt 1070 (P.1070). A twin-engined straight-wing design, the P.1070 was canceled in favor of the similar P.65. The P.65 was designed with a straight wing, similar to the P.1070, as well as an unswept vertical stabilizer. The prototypes were to be powered by two BMW 003 (P.3302) turbojet engines, while production aircraft would have had two BMW P.3304 engines. Messerschmitt later redesigned the P.65 with swept wings and tail surfaces as the P.1065, which was to have conventional landing gear and be armed with three MG 151 cannons with 250 rounds each. As of July 1940, the RLM ordered 20 prototypes of the P.1065 and planned to take delivery of the first aircraft by September of that year. However, delays with the BMW 003 engines meant that no P.1065 prototypes had been built by the end of the year.

In February 1941, Messerschmitt began work on the P.1065 V1, which was powered by a single Junkers Jumo 210G piston engine driving a two-bladed propeller. The V1 prototype made its first flight on April 18, 1941, ten days after the P.1065 was assigned the designation Me 262. In September 1941, BMW delivered the P.3302 engines to Messerschmitt, which were fitted to the Me 262 V1 after it had flown 47 times under piston power. The BMW-powered V1, which retained its Jumo engine, made its first take-off under jet power on March 25, 1941. Both engines suffered a compressor blade failure during the flight, forcing test pilot Fritz Wendel to land under piston power alone.

Following the successful test flights of the rival Heinkel He 280, the RLM cut back its initial order for 20 prototypes to just five on May 29, 1942. However, only three days later, Messerschmitt took delivery of two Junkers Jumo 004A turbojet engines. These were fitted to a new prototype, the Me 262 V3, which, after a failed first take-off attempt, took off on the second attempt and flew without problems on June 18. Following the success of the V3, the V2 prototype (which was intended to be powered by the BMW 003) was fitted with these engines and a new V4 prototype was built to this configuration. The conventional landing gear of the first four prototypes caused exhaust from the engines to deflect off the runway and caused the tail to be caught in the turbulence, making take-off difficult. To remedy this, the V5 prototype was built with fixed tricycle landing gear, and the definitive V6 was built with retractable tricycle gear.

Engine troubles continued to plague the Me 262 even after the switch to the Jumo 004. While airframe modifications were completed in 1942, a lack of engines meant that serial production did not begin until 1944.

=== Summary of Me 262 prototypes ===
- P.1065 V1, first prototype, initially powered by a single Jumo 210G in the nose, but later fitted with two BMW P.3302 turbojet engines. Redesignated Me 262 V1 in April 1941.
- P.1065 V2, second prototype, intended to be powered by BMW P.3302 engines, but fitted with Jumo 004A engines instead. Redesignated Me 262 V2 in April 1941.
- Me 262 V3, third prototype, first to be fitted with Jumo 004A engines.
- Me 262 V4, prototype with Jumo 004A engines.
- Me 262 V5, prototype with Jumo 004A engines and fixed tricycle landing gear.
- Me 262 V6, prototype for the production Me 262A with retractable tricycle landing gear and Jumo 004B-1 engines.
- Me 262 V7, prototype with Jumo 004A engines and a pressurized cockpit.
- Me 262 V8, prototype with Jumo 004A engines and four 30 mm MK 108 cannons in the nose. Later modified for use in high-speed tests as the Hochgeschwindigkeit I (HG I).
- Me 262 V9, prototype with Jumo 004A engines used for testing radio equipment.
- Me 262 V10, prototype with Jumo 004A engines with two bomb pylons under the wings and RATO gear.
- Me 262 V12, streamlined high-speed prototype.

== Early variant drawings ==
Messerschmitt released a report on September 11, 1943 featuring drawings of multiple proposed variants and derivatives of the production Me 262. Some of these proposals were later built in prototype form.

- Jäger, main production variant.
  - Jäger A1, fighter version, became the Me 262A-1.
  - Jäger u.Jabo, fighter-bomber version, became the Me 262A-2.
- Interzeptor, variant with liquid-propellant rocket engines complementing or replacing the jet engines.
  - Interzeptor I, with single Walter HWK RII-211 rocket engine in the tail, became the Me 262C-1.
  - Interzeptor II, with BMW 003R combined-thrust turbojet engines with built-in BMW 109-718 rockets, became the Me 262C-2.
  - Interzeptor III, with Walter HWK 109-509 rockets replacing the jet engines entirely, became the Me 262C-3.
- Schnellbomber, pure bomber variant.
  - Schnellbomber I, similar to Jäger u.Jabo, but with guns removed and increased fuel capacity.
  - Schnellbomber Ia, with lengthened fuselage featuring increased fuel capacity and cockpit moved to the nose.
  - Schnellbomber II, with enlarged fuselage featuring increased fuel capacity and internal bomb load.
- Aufklärer, reconnaissance variant.
  - Aufklärer I, similar to Jäger, but with guns replaced with cameras.
  - Aufklärer Ia, similar to Schnellbomber Ia, but with cameras in the rear fuselage.
  - Aufklärer II, similar to Schnellbomber II, but with cameras in the nose.
- Schulflugzeug, two-seat trainer variant, became the Me 262B-1.
- Panzerflugzeug, armored ground-attack variant, became the Me 262A-3.
  - Panzerflugzeug I
  - Panzerflugzeug II

== Me 262A ==
=== Pre-production, A-0 ===
Sixteen pre-production aircraft were ordered before the V6 prototype first flew. Delivery of these aircraft, designated Me 262A-0, were delayed by a shortage of engines. They were eventually delivered in April 1944, with an additional seven being delivered the following month for a total of 23 aircraft. The Me 262A-0s were sent to Erprobungsstelle Rechlin for evaluation. Pilots were satisfied with the Me 262's flight characteristics, and the Me 262 was ordered into full-scale production.

=== A-1 Schwalbe ===
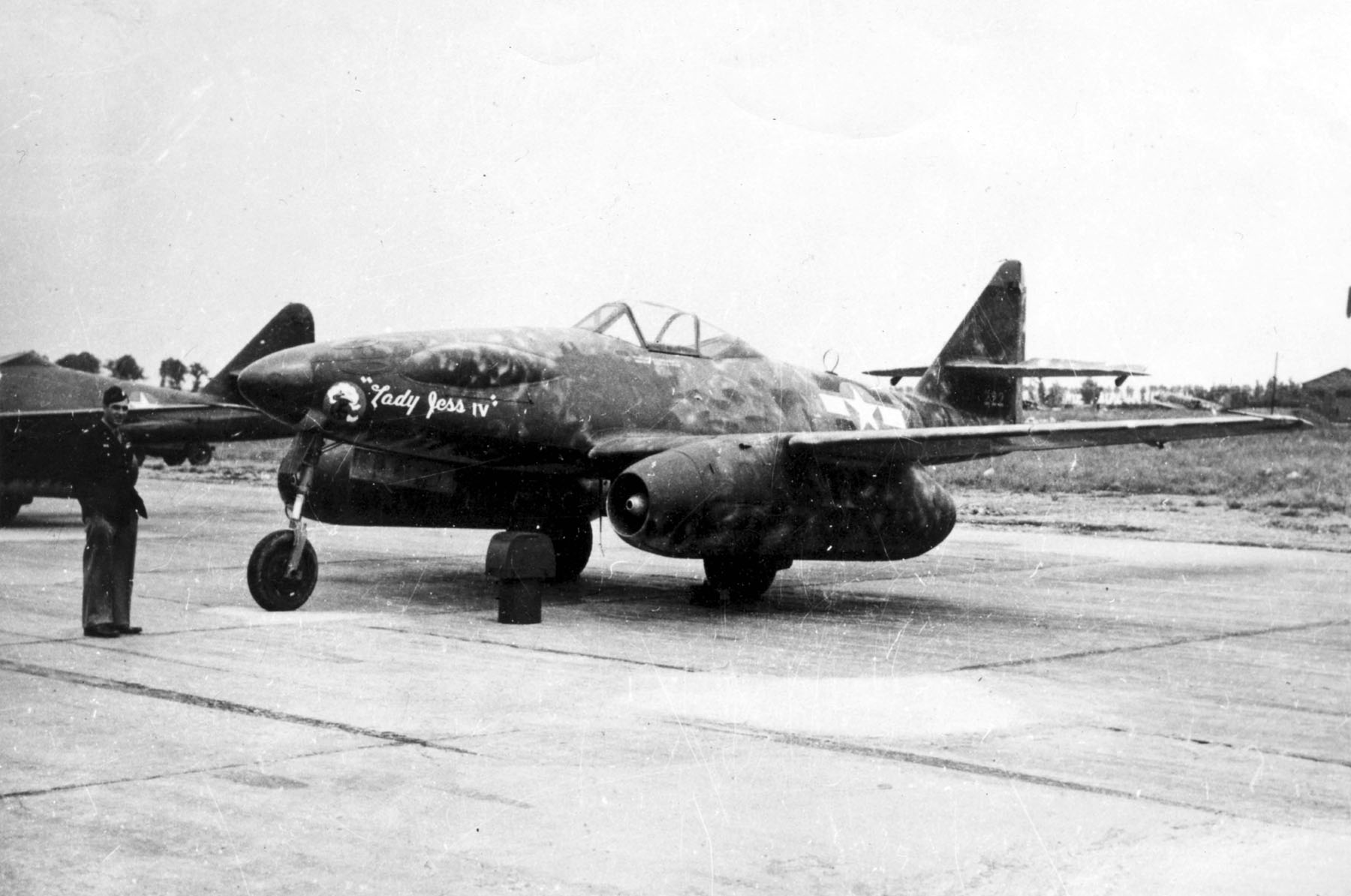
Lady Jess IV (FE-108), an Me 262A-1a/U3 captured by American forces at the end of the war.

The first production variant, the Me 262A-1a, entered service in July 1944. This variant, nicknamed Schwalbe (German: "Swallow"), was powered by two 8.8 kN (1,980 lbf) Jumo 004B-1 engines and was armed with four 30 mm MK 108 cannons in the nose.

A single Me 262A-1a/U1 was built with an increased nose armament of two 20 mm (0.787 in) MG 151 cannons, two 30 mm (1.181 in) MK 103 cannons, and two 30 mm (1.181 in) MK 108 cannons. A single night fighter prototype was built at the Me 262A-1a/U2 with FuG 220 Lichtenstein SN-2 90 MHz radar transceiver and a Hirschgeweih (stag's antlers) antenna array. The Me 262A-1a/U3 was a reconnaissance modification built in small numbers with either Rb 20/30 cameras or one Rb 20/20 and one Rb 75/30 camera. Two Me 262A-1a/U4 bomber destroyer prototypes were built with a single 50 mm (1.969 in) anti-tank gun in the nose. The /U4 was originally intended to be armed with the MK 214A cannon, but a lack of availability meant that it was fitted with a Rheinmetall BK-5 in the interim. The MK 214A was eventually fitted to the /U4 in February 1945, but the aircraft was not accepted for production. The Me 262A-1a/U5 was a heavy fighter prototype with six MK 108 cannons in the nose.

The Me 262A-1b was a modification of the A-1a with BMW 003A engines in place of the Jumo 004s. Only three such aircraft were built.

=== A-2 Sturmvogel ===
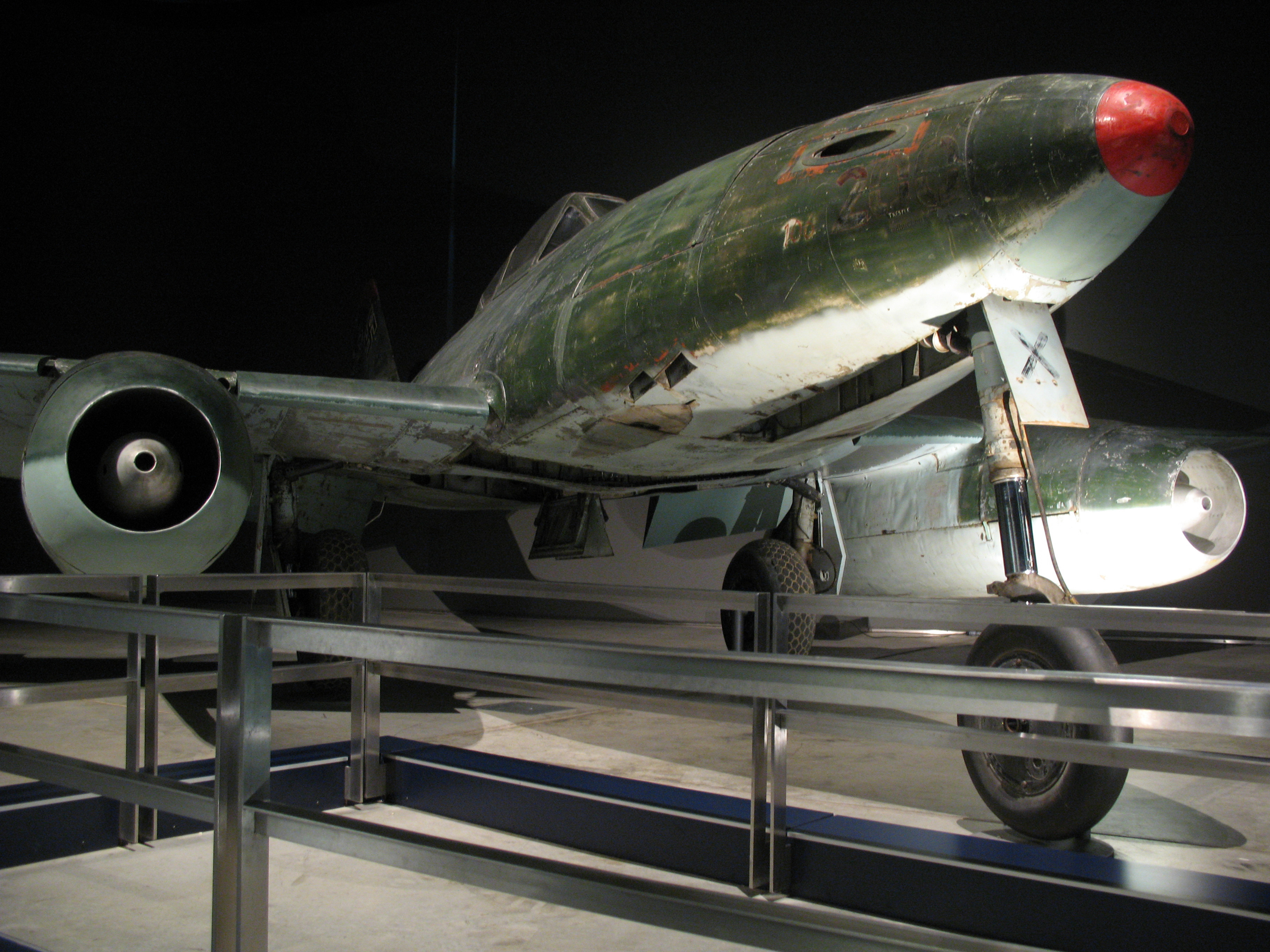
The sole surviving Me 262A-2a. This aircraft retained its empty upper gun ports.

Based on the Jäger u.Jabo proposal from the September 1943 report, the Me 262A-2a, nicknamed Sturmvogel (German: "Storm Bird"), was the definitive fighter-bomber version of the Me 262. While similar to the Me 262A-1a, the A-2a featured bomb racks capable of carrying two 250 kg (550 lb) or 500 kg (1,100 lb) bombs under the fuselage, and the upper pair of guns was deleted for balance, though some aircraft retained their empty upper gun ports.

One aircraft was fitted with a TSA bombsight as the Me 262A-2a/U1. Two Me 262A-2a/U2 prototypes were built with a glazed nose for a bombardier.

=== A-3 ===
The Me 262A-3a was a proposed low-level ground-attack variant of the Me 262A. Based on the Panzerflugzeug concepts from the September 1943 report, the A-3a would have had increased armor for the pilot, ammunition, air intakes, and fuel. The increased armor was expected to bring a decrease in range and performance, and no prototypes were built before the end of the war.

=== A-4, A-5 ===
The Me 262A-4a was an interim unarmed reconnaissance variant of the Me 262A. It was replaced by the armed Me 262A-5a, which had two MK 108 cannons as well as drop tanks.

=== Rüstsätze (field modification kits) ===
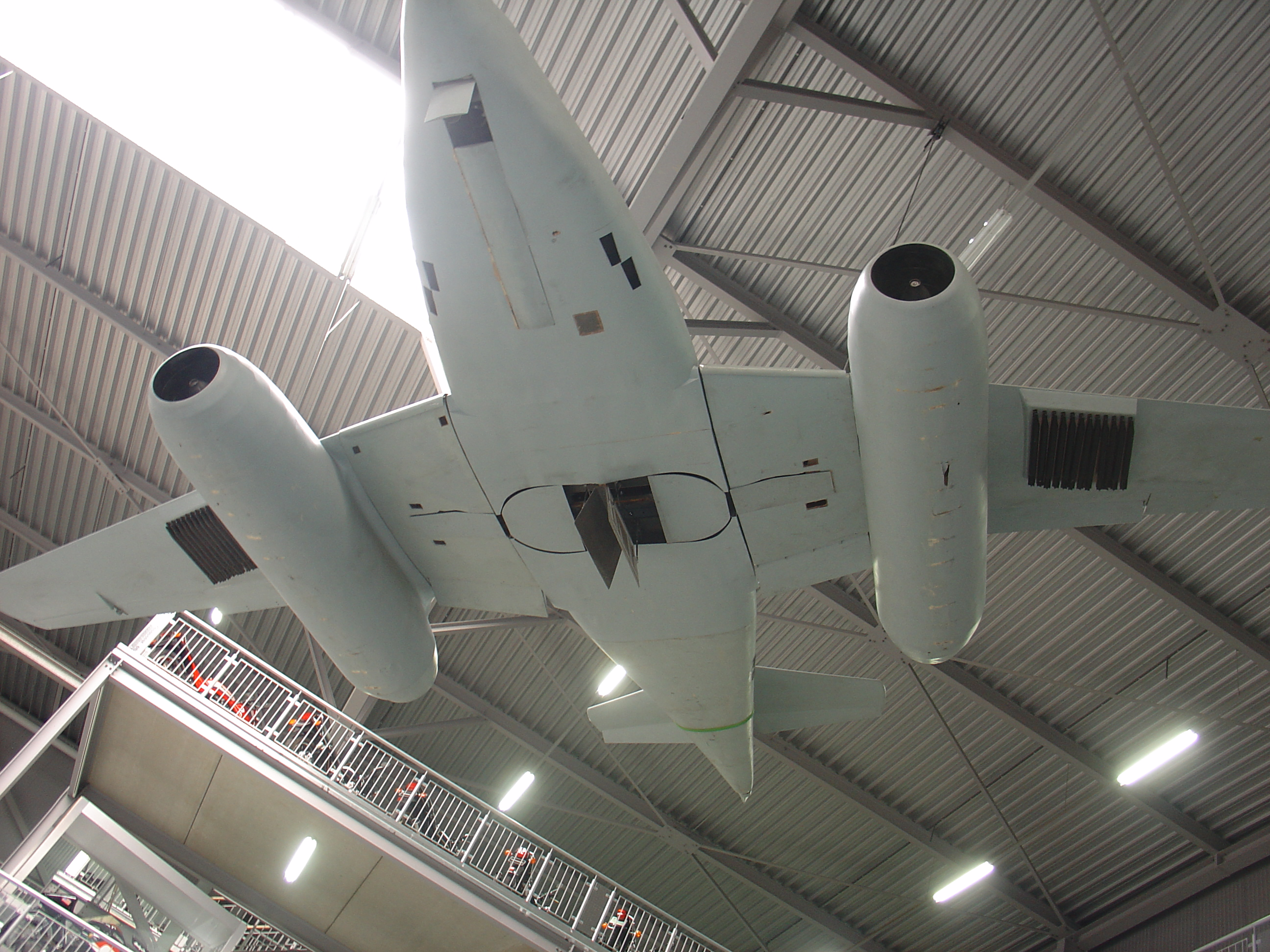
Mock-up of an Me 262A-1a/R7 displaying racks for twelve R4M rockets under each wing.

Several Rüstsätze field modification kits were made for the Me 262. These kits, denoted by /R numbers, differed from the Umrüst-Bausätze kits (/U numbers) in that they could be fitted in the field rather than being installed in the factory. The following Rüstsätze were made for the Me 262A:

- /R1, underfuselage pylon for 500 L (110.0 imp gal; 132.1 US gal) external fuel tank.
- /R2, RATO installation for two Rheinmetall 109-502 solid rocket engines.
- /R3, BMW 003R rocket boosted turbojet installation.
- /R4, installation of the FuG 350 Zc Naxos radar warning receiver/detector.
- /R5, standard 4x MK 108 cannon installation.
- /R6, Jabo (JagdBomber) equipment, such as bombsights and bomb racks.
- /R7, underwing installation of 12x R4M rockets carried on wooden racks.
- /R8, R110BS air-to-air rocket installation.
- /R9, Ruhrstahl X-4 air-to-air missile installation.

== Me 262B ==
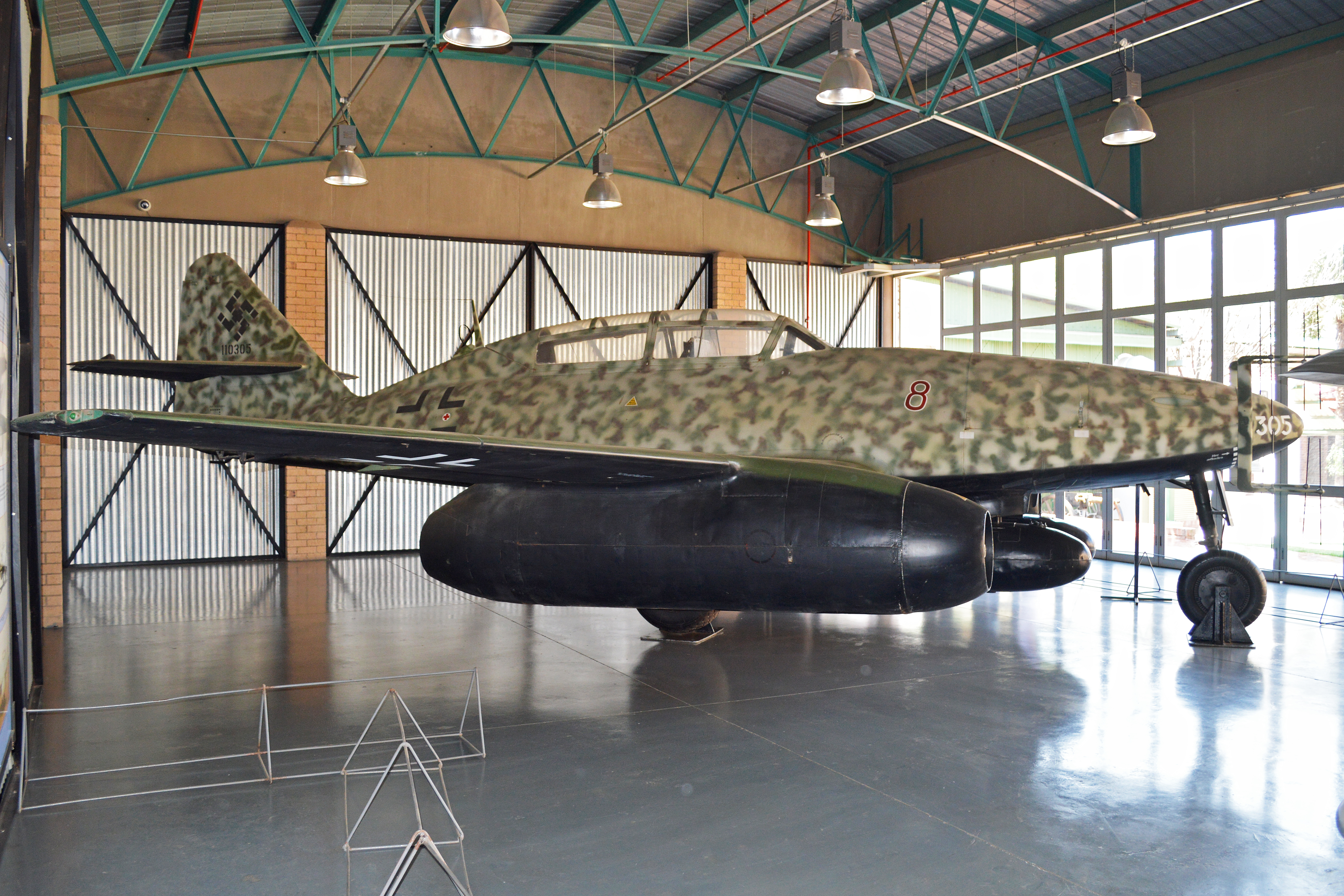
Me 262B-1a/U1

The need for a jet-powered trainer for the Luftwaffe led Messerschmitt to develop the dual-control Me 262B-1a. The B-1a was similar to the A-1a, but had a second seat in place of the rear fuel tank. Provisions for external fuel tanks were provided to extend the range. Only 15 B-1a trainers were built, with some being modified as Me 262B-1a/U1 night fighters. The B-1a/U1 was equipped with a FuG 218 Neptun radar and was armed with two MK 108 and two MG 151 cannons. Operationally, the radar's antenna proved to be a source of drag, but the B-1a/U1 could still outrun the de Havilland Mosquito.

The success of the Me 262B-1a/U1 led to the development of the Me 262B-2a, a dedicated night fighter. The B-2a had a stretched fuselage with increased fuel capacity and was to be armed with two upward-facing MK 108 cannons in a Schräge Musik configuration behind the cockpit. Early models were to have been fitted with a Neptun radar with "antler" antennas, but later production aircraft would have been fitted with a FuG 240 Berlin with an internal antenna. Only one prototype was built before the war ended.

== Me 262C ==
Me 262C-1a

The Me 262C home defense fighter was developed from the Interzeptor series of proposals from the September 1943 report. The first variant was the Me 262C-1a, also known as Heimatschützer I, which was developed from Interzeptor I. The C-1a was similar to the A-1a, but had a Walter HWK 109-509A-1 rocket engine housed in the tail. A single prototype was built from an A-1a, which first flew under turbojet power on October 16, 1944. The first flight under rocket power was conducted on February 27, 1945. The C-1a prototype piloted by Major Heinrich Bär reportedly intercepted and shot down a Republic P-47 Thunderbolt. However, the internal mounting of the rocket engine limited internal fuel storage for the turbojets and made servicing the rocket difficult.

A single prototype of the Me 262C-2b (Heimatschützer II) was converted from an A-1a. Based on the Interzeptor II proposal, the C-2b was powered by two BMW 003R mixed-power turbojets; a combination of a BMW 003A turbojet and a BMW 109-718 rocket engine. The C-2b, piloted by Karl Baur, made its only flight in March 1945.

There were two versions of the Me 262C-3. The first, Heimatschützer III, was derived from the Interzeptor III proposal and would have replaced the turbojets of the A-1a with Walter HWK RII-211 rocket engines. The second, Heimatschützer IV or Me 262C-3a, retained its turbojets and was to be fitted with a jettisonable Walter HWK 109-509S-2 and fuel tanks under the fuselage. Construction of the prototype was started before the end of the war, but problems with the installation of the rocket engine meant that it could not be finished before the factory was overrun by Allied forces in April 1945.

== Me 262 HG ==
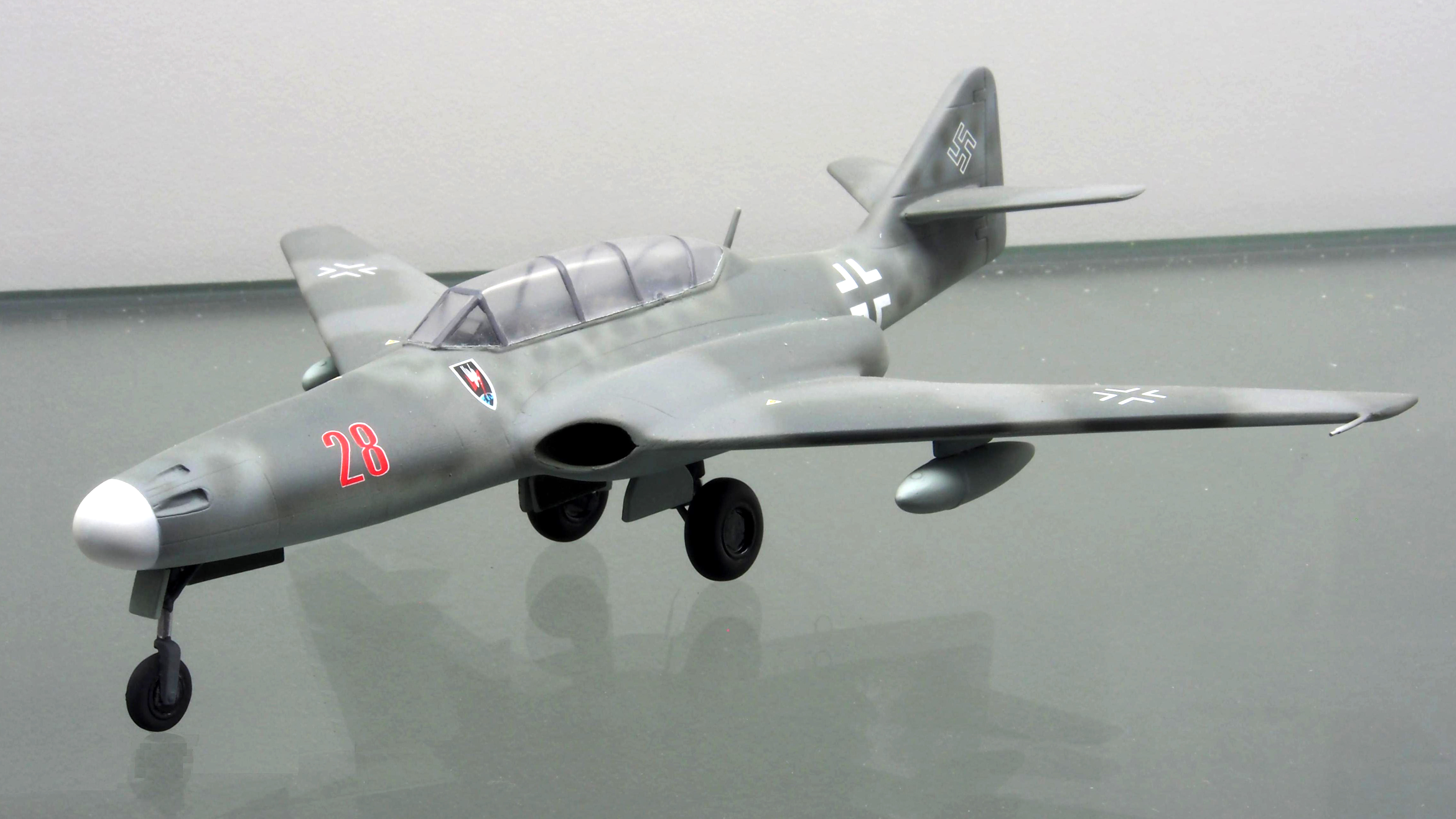
Model of the Me 262 HG III at Technikmuseum Speyer

In April 1941, Adolf Busemann proposed that a 35° swept wing be fitted to the Me 262. Although this was not implemented, it did lead to the development of the Hochgeschwindigkeit ("high-speed") project to improve the Me 262's speed. In 1944, the Me 262 V8 prototype was modified with a low profile canopy, known as the Rennkabine ("racing cabin"), as the Hochgeschwindigkeit I, or Me 262 HG I.

The more radical Hochgeschwindigkeit II (Me 262 HG II) proposal was to feature a new 35° swept wing with engines moved closer to the fuselage and a V-tail, though this was changed back to a conventional tail after wind tunnel tests showed that the V-tail was unstable. The Hochgeschwindigkeit III (Me 262 HG III) was to have a 45° swept wing and Heinkel HeS 011 engines in the wing roots. Neither of these projects were built.

== Late-war proposals ==
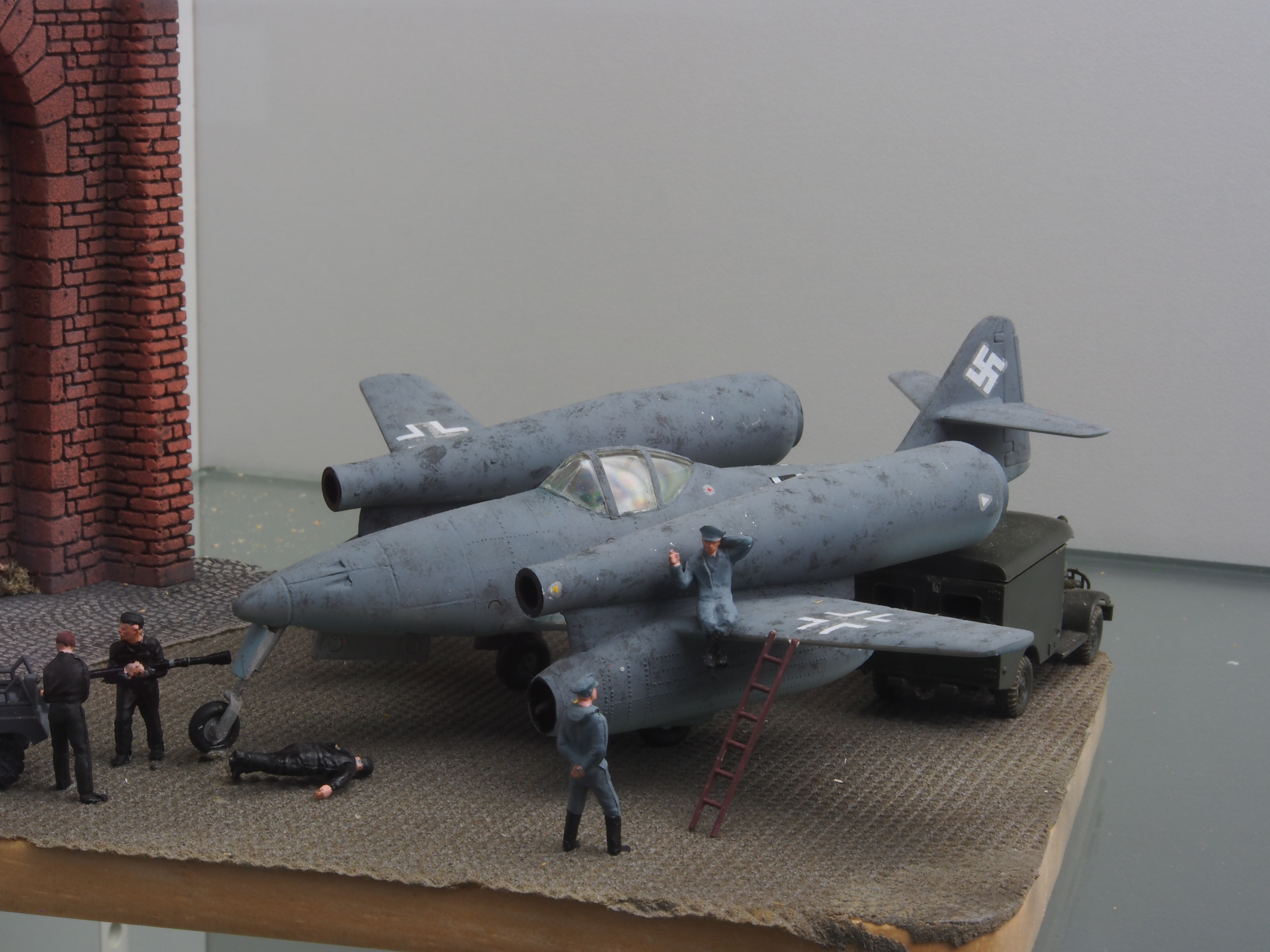
Model of an Me 262 Lorin

The Me 262D-1 was a proposed Zerstörer variant. It was to be armed with twelve SG 500 Jagdfaust recoilless rifles in the nose, which were meant to be fired from under an enemy bomber.

The Me 262E-1 was to be fitted with a 50 mm MK 114 cannon in the nose, similar to the Me 262A-1a/U4. The project was abandoned because the cannon flash and smoke limited visibility, but not before four prototypes were converted from Me 262A-1a airframes. The Me 262E-2 was a proposed rocket-armed variant with a total of 48 R4M rockets; 12 on each wing and 24 in the nose.

The Me 262W-1 was a proposed pulsejet-powered variant with two 2.7 kN (610 lbf) Argus As 014 engines. The similar Me 262W-3 proposal was to be fitted with two 4.90 kN (1,102 lbf) "square-intake" Argus As 044 engines. One of the more radical proposals was the ramjet-powered Me 262 Lorin. This variant was to be fitted with two Lorin ramjets (named after ramjet inventor René Lorin) mounted over the wings; one over each turbojet, resulting in a four-engined aircraft. Performance was expected to increase dramatically, but at the cost of range, which would have been reduced by about 80%.

== Proposed derivatives ==
=== P.1099 ===
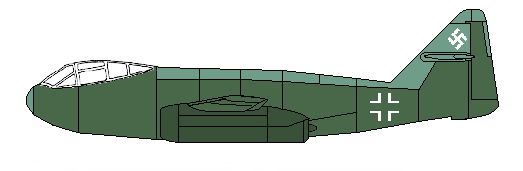
P.1099A

Proposed in January 1944 as a multirole development of the Me 262, the P.1099 was based on the Schnellbomber Ia concept from 1943. Two variants were proposed, the P.1099A and P.1099B. The P.1099A was to have the wings and tail of the Me 262A-2a, but with an enlarged fuselage and two-wheel main undercarriage. Two crew were to sit in an enlarged cockpit in the front of the aircraft, and it was to be powered by two Jumo 004C engines. A total of five different armament configurations were proposed, which are detailed in the table below.

The similar P.1099B featured a redesigned cockpit housing two or three crew. Three armament configurations were proposed, including some with defensive armament in barbettes.

Armament configurations
P.1099A
Fighter I	Configuration A	4x 30 mm MK 108 cannon
Fighter I	Configuration B	2x 30 mm MK 103 cannon
Fighter I	Configuration C	2x 30 mm MK 108 cannon; 1x 30 mm MK 103 cannon
Fighter II	Configuration A	1x 30 mm MK 108 cannon; 1x 55 mm MK 112 cannon
Fighter II	Configuration B	1x 50 mm MK 214 cannon
P.1099B
Fighter I	Configuration A	4x 30 mm MK 103 cannon; 2x 20 mm FPL 151 cannon
Fighter I	Configuration B	2x 30 mm MK 103 cannon; 1x 50 mm MK 214 cannon; 1x 20 mm FPL 151 cannon
Fighter II	Configuration A	4x 30 mm MK 108 cannon; 2x 30 mm MK 108 cannon (Schräge Musik)

=== P.1100 ===
Based on the P.1099, the P.1100 was a proposed bomber development of the Me 262. Two different designs were proposed, with the P.1100/I sharing the same layout as the P.1099 but with an internal bomb bay capable of carrying a 2,000 kg (4,400 lb) bomb. It was to be crewed by a pilot and a navigator/bombardier, with the pilot sitting in an offset cockpit. Power was to be provided by two Jumo 004C turbojets, with plans to upgrade to Heinkel HeS 011 engines later on. No defensive armament was planned for this variant.

The P.1100/II was to have the swept wings and engines of the Me 262 HG III and be crewed by two in the cockpit. Multiple defensive armament configurations were proposed. Despite interest from the RLM, both the P.1099 and P.1100 were canceled in 1945 due to fears that they would be underpowered.

== Avia S-92 Turbina ==
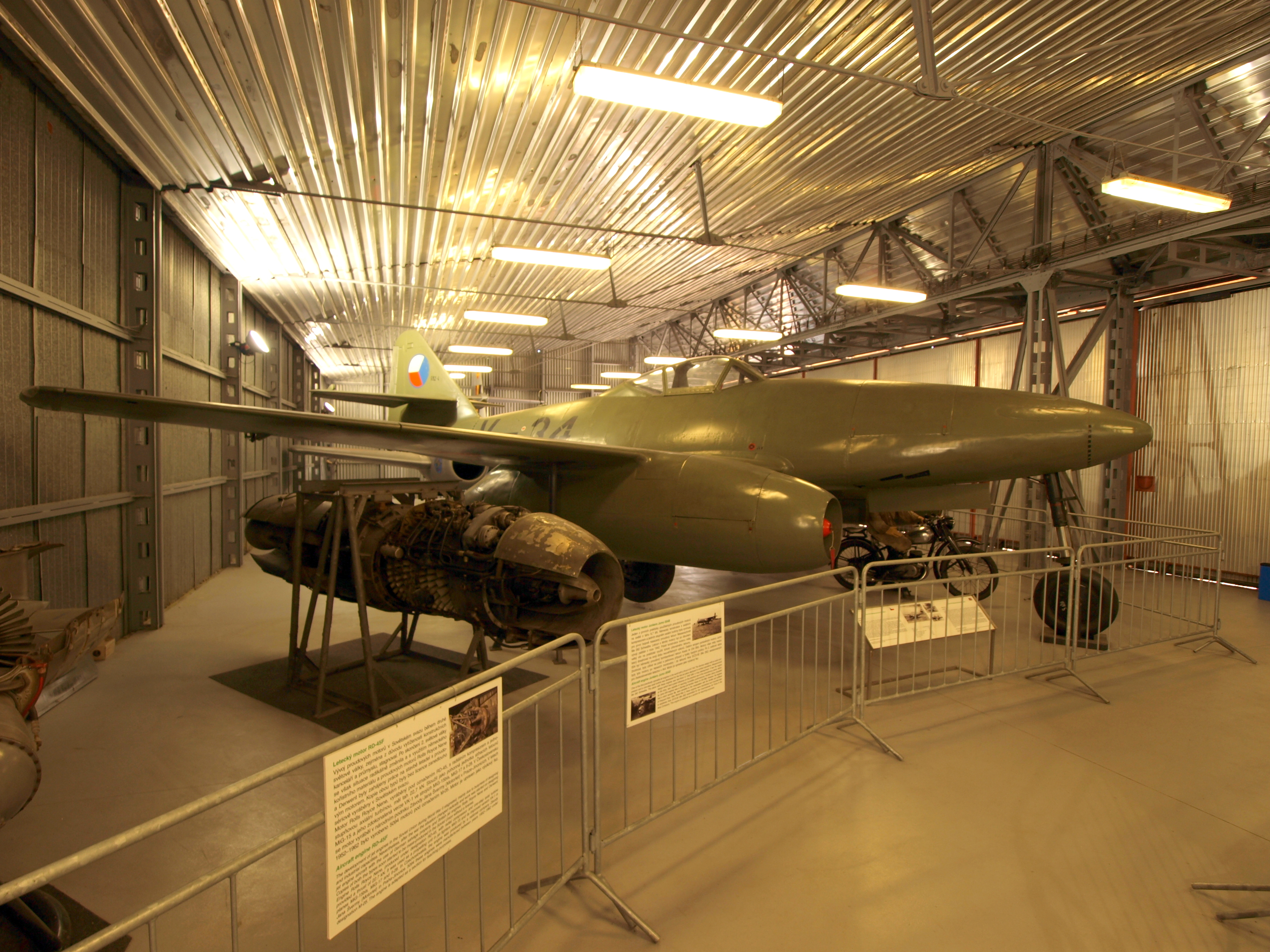
Surviving S-92 at the Kbely Aviation Museum in Prague.

During the later stages of the war, production of the Me 262 was carried out by factories in German-occupied Czechoslovakia. After the end of the war in Europe, no airworthy Me 262s were left in the country, with all either being destroyed by retreating German forces or confiscated by the former Allied powers. However, the Czech factories still had the necessary equipment to build new aircraft. Although there was initially insufficient documentation to replicate the Me 262, the missing plans were obtained from an American aviation magazine. Avia was charged with continuing production of the Me 262 post-war under the designation S-92, nicknamed "Turbina".

The Turbina was built in two variants; the single-seat S-92 and the two-seat CS-92. The first two prototypes were designated S-92.1 and S-92.2, with the former making its first flight on October 24, 1946. Most Turbina aircraft were powered by a pair of Avia M-04 turbojets (locally produced Jumo 004s), though one prototype, S-92.7, was powered by a pair of BMW 003s. Only nine S-92s and three CS-92s were built, and by the early 1950s they were outclassed by more modern fighters and were soon replaced by newer Soviet jets.

== Reproductions ==
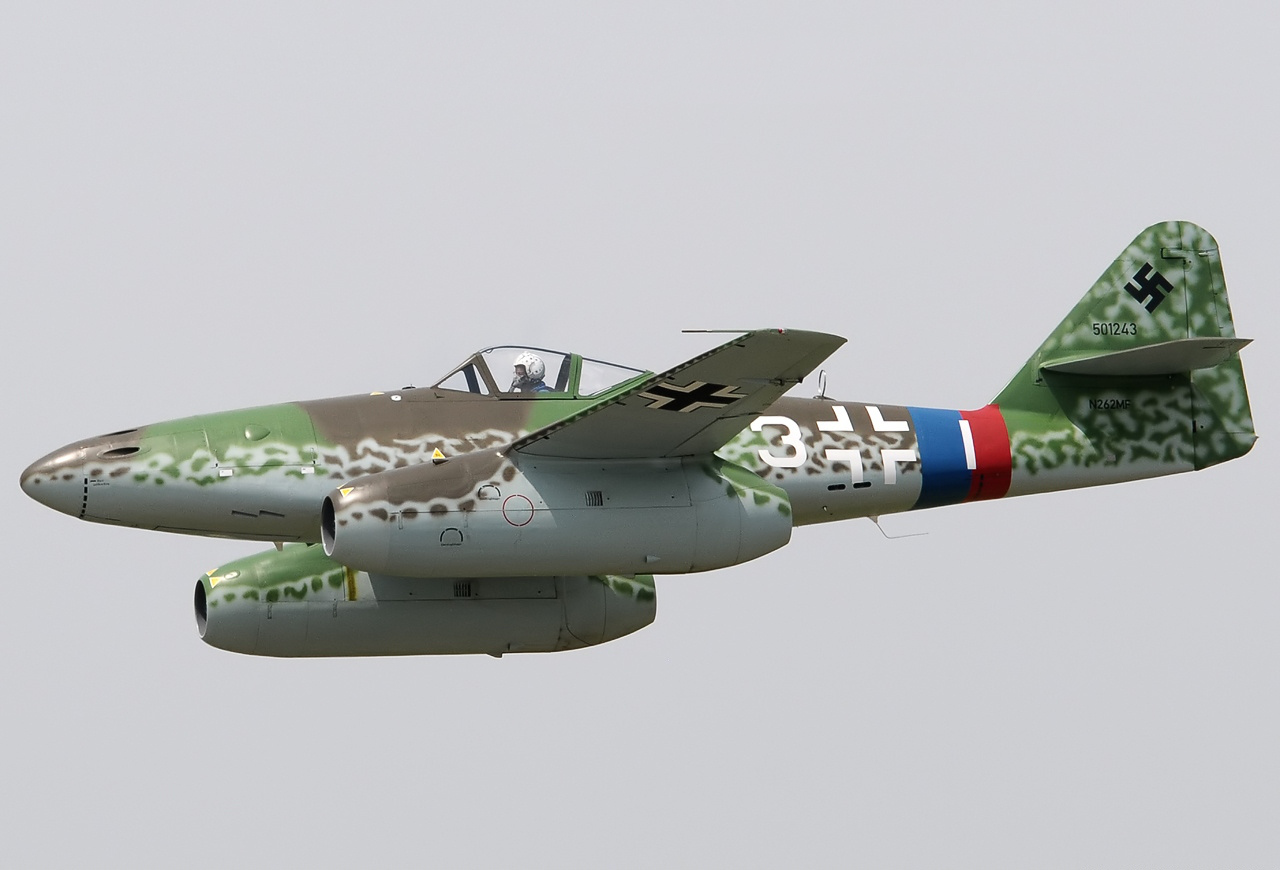
Me 262A/B-1c in single-seat configuration.

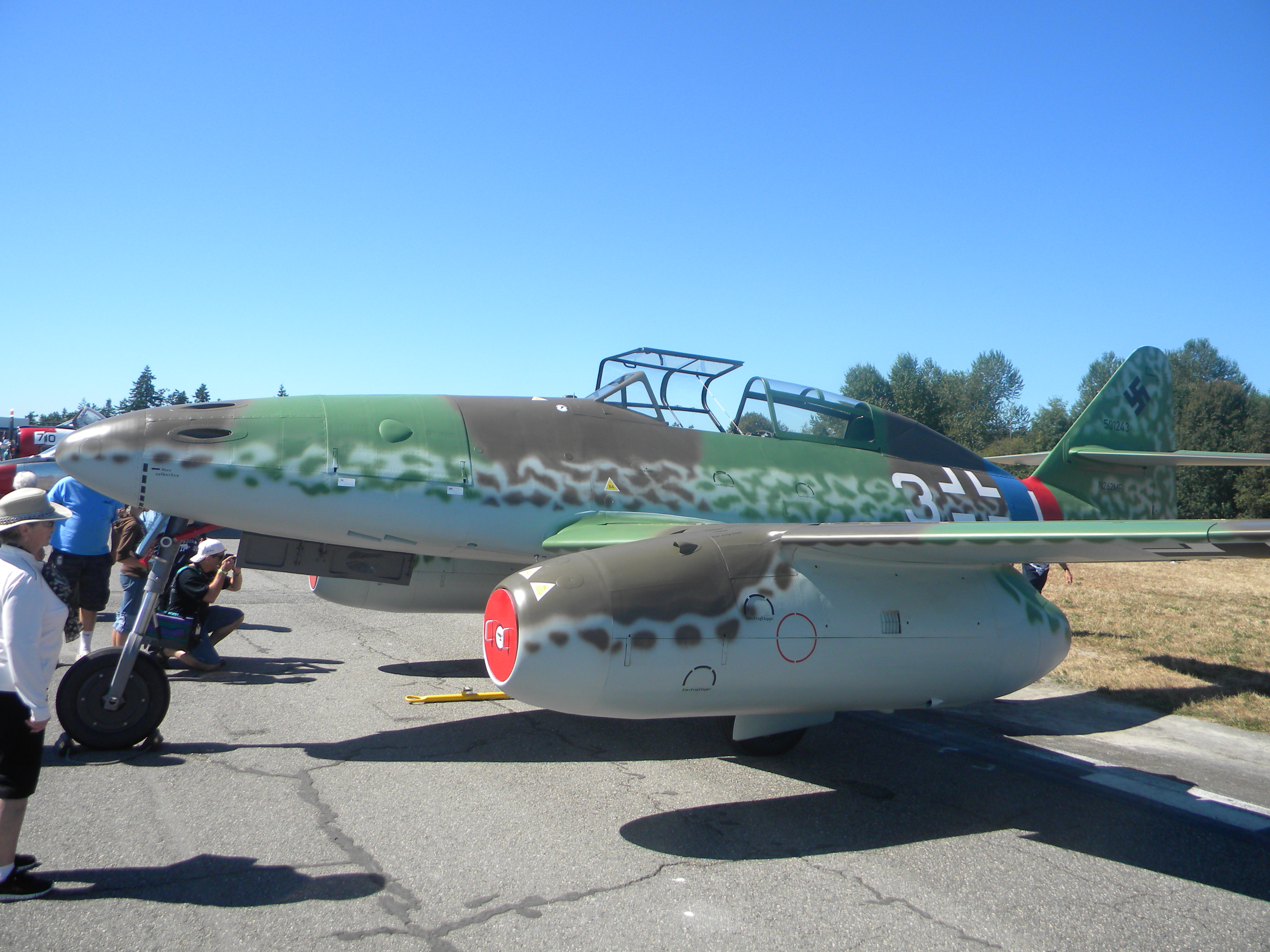
The same aircraft in two-seat configuration.

Five Me 262 reproductions were built by the Me 262 Project. These reproductions are faithful to the original aircraft, but have several upgrades to improve safety. These upgrades include strengthened landing gear and improved brakes, and power was provided by two modern General Electric CJ610 turbojets in place of the less reliable Jumo 004. The change in engine led to these reproductions using the "c" suffix in place of the "a" and "b" suffixes used for Jumo 004-powered and BMW 003-powered wartime variants, respectively. The aircraft were built in three models; the single-seat Me 262A-1c, the two-seat Me 262B-1c, and the interchangeable one/two-seat Me 262A/B-1c. The first reproduction, an Me 262B-1c, made its first flight on December 20, 2002.

== Summary of Me 262 variants ==
- Me 262A, single-seat variant.
  - Me 262A-0, pre-production aircraft based on the V6 prototype.
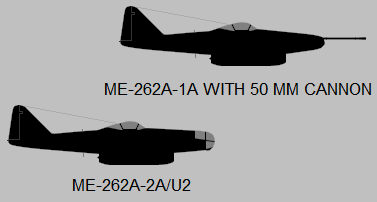
    Me 262A-1a/U4 (above) and Me 262A-2a/U2 (below)
  - Me 262A-1a, main fighter variant with Jumo 004B-1 engines.
    - Me 262A-1a/U1, up-gunned prototype with two MG 151, two MK 103, and two MK 108 cannons. One built.
    - Me 262A-1a/U2, night-fighter prototype with a FuG 220 Lichtenstein SN-2 90 MHz radar transceiver. One built.
    - Me 262A-1a/U3, unarmed reconnaissance modification with two Rb 20/30 cameras or one Rb 20/20 and one Rb 75/30 camera.
    - Me 262A-1a/U4, bomber destroyer prototypes with a single BK-5 or MK 214A cannon. Two built.
    - Me 262A-1a/U5, heavy fighter prototype with six MK 108 cannons.
  - Me 262A-1b, fighter prototype with BMW 003A engines. Three built.
  - Me 262A-2a, fighter-bomber variant.
    - Me 262A-2a/U1, prototype with improved bombsight. One built.
    - Me 262A-2a/U2, prototype with glazed nose for bombardier. Two built.
  - Me 262A-3a, proposed ground-attack variant. None built.
  - Me 262A-4a, unarmed reconnaissance variant.
  - Me 262A-5a, armed reconnaissance variant.
- Me 262B, two-seat variant.
  - Me 262B-1a, trainer variant based on the Me 262A-1a. 15 built.
    - Me 262B-1a/U1, night fighter modification with an FuG 218 Neptun radar and armed with two MK 108 and two MG 151 cannons.
  - Me 262B-2a, dedicated night fighter variant with an FuG 218 Neptun or FuG 240 Berlin radar and two Schräge Musik MK 108 cannons. One built.
- Me 262C, mixed or rocket-powered interceptor.
  - Me 262C-1a, A-1a with Walter HWK 109-509A-1 rocket engine in the tail. One built.
  - Me 262C-2b, powered by two BMW 003R mixed turbojet/rocket engines. One built.
  - Me 262C-3, proposed pure rocket-powered variant with Walter HWK RII-211 rocket engines in place of the turbojets.
  - Me 262C-3a, proposed turbojet-powered variant with jettisonable HWK 109-509S-2 rocket engine.
- Me 262D, Zerstörer variant.
  - Me 262D-1, proposed variant armed with twelve SG 500 Jagdfaust recoilless rifles.
- Me 262E, ground attack variant.
  - Me 262E-1, variant armed with a single MK 114 cannon. Four prototypes converted from Me 262A-1as.
  - Me 262E-2, proposed variant armed with 48 R4M rockets.
- Me 262W, pulsejet-powered variant.
  - Me 262W-1, proposed variant powered by two Argus As 014 engines.
  - Me 262W-3, proposed variant powered by two Argus As 044 engines.
- Me 262 HG I, V9 prototype with a low profile Rennkabine canopy.
- Me 262 HG II, proposed variant with a 35° wing sweep.
- Me 262 HG III, proposed variant with a 45° wing sweep and Heinkel HeS 011 engines.
- Me 262 Lorin, proposed variant with two Lorin ramjets complementing the turbojet engines.
- Me 262A-1c, modern reproduction of the Me 262A-1a with General Electric CJ610 turbojets. One built.
- Me 262B-1c, modern reproduction of the Me 262B-1a with General Electric CJ610 turbojets. Two built.
- Me 262A/B-1c, modern reproduction with General Electric CJ610 turbojets, convertible between single and two-seat configurations. Two built.
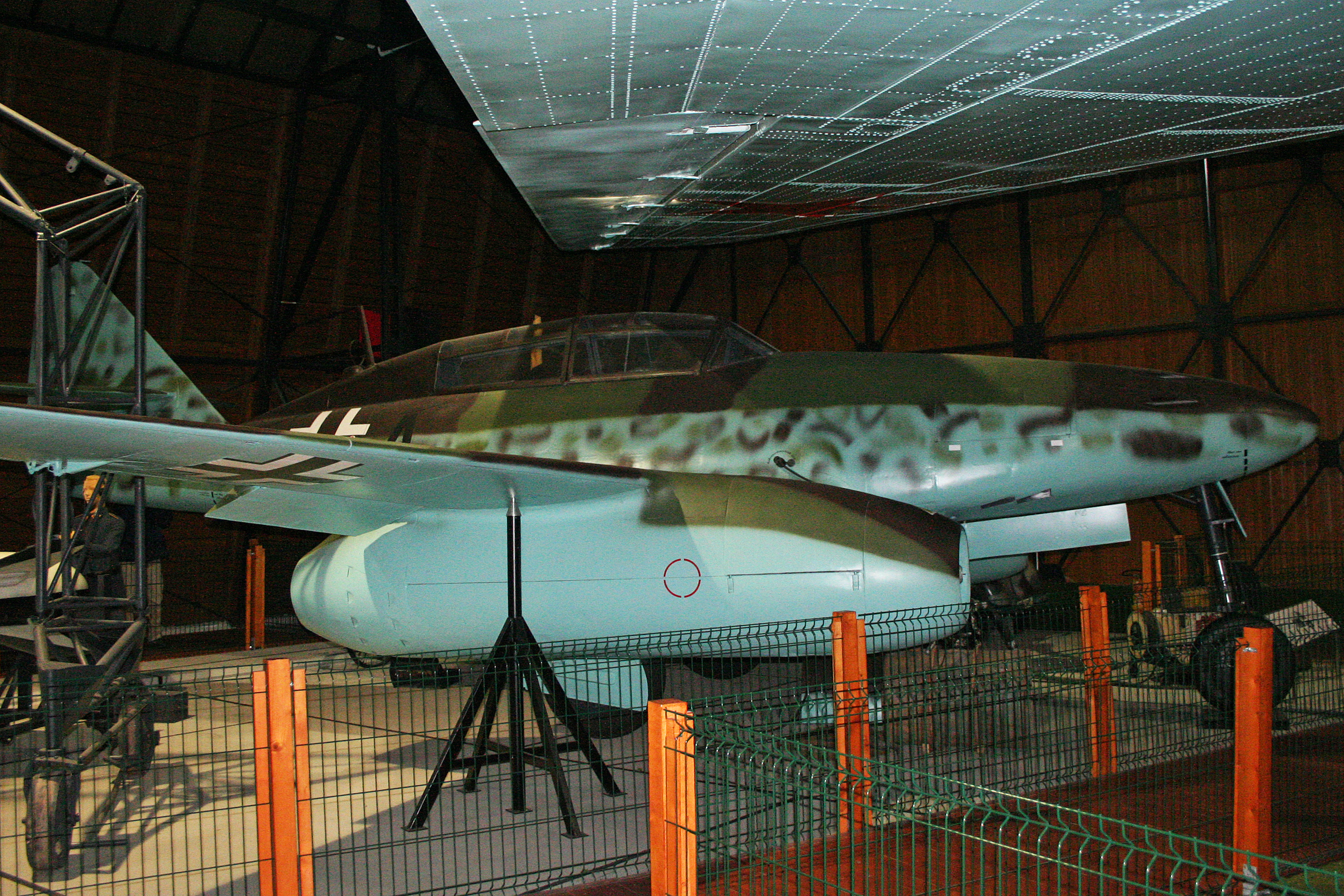
  CS-92 painted as a Luftwaffe Me 262B at the Kbely Aviation Museum.
- S-92, Czech variant of the Me 262A-1a with Avia M-04 turbojets. Nine built.
  - S-92.1, designation of the first prototype.
  - S-92.2, designation of the second prototype.
  - S-92.7, prototype with BMW 003 turbojets.
- CS-92, two-seat variant of the S-92. Three built.
