= MK 214A cannon =

MK 214A
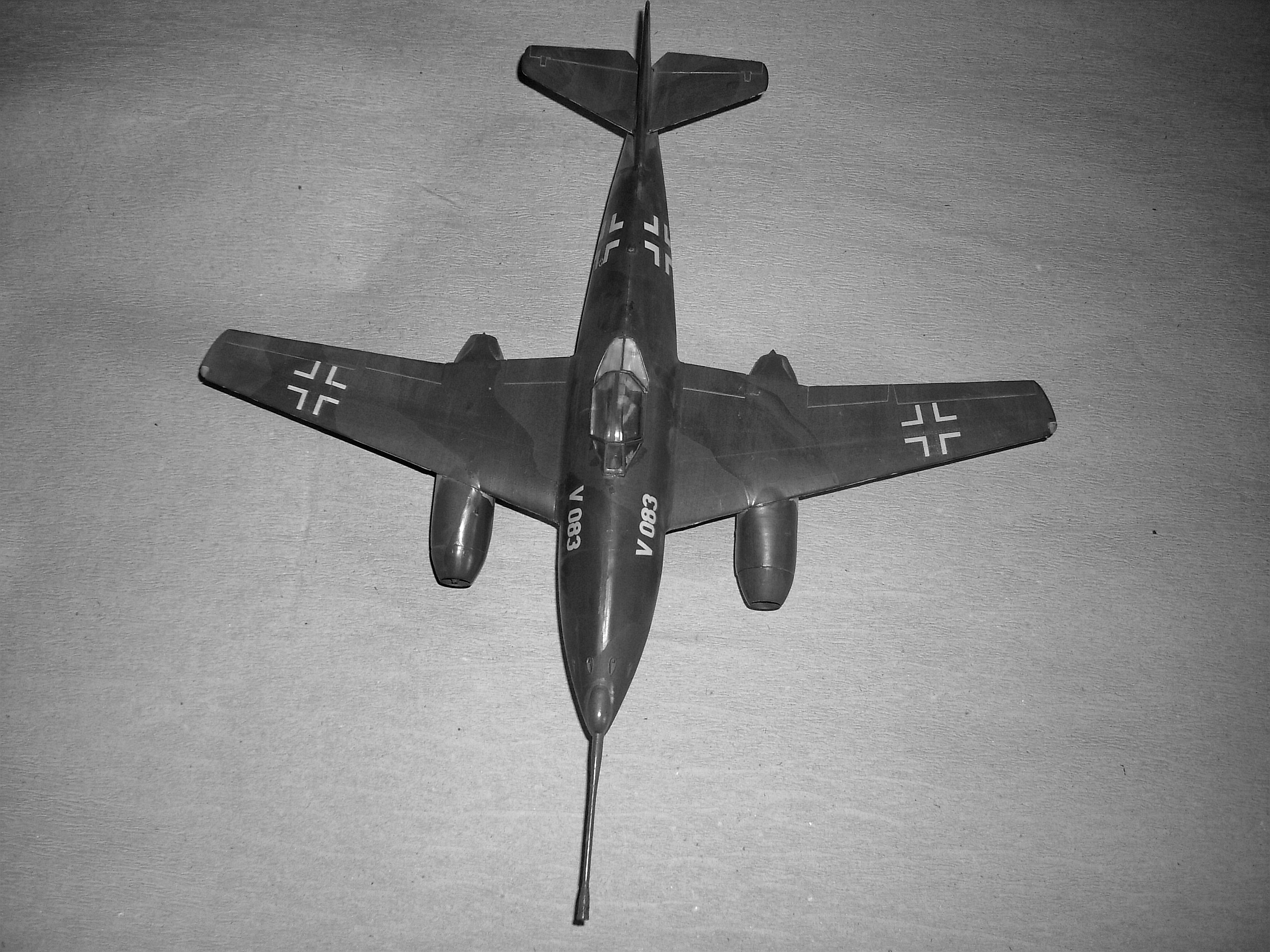
- A model of Me 262 with the MK 214 installed
- Type: Single-barrel automatic cannon
- Place of origin: Nazi Germany

Service history
- Used by: Nazi Germany (Test / R&D only)
- Wars: World War II

Production history
- Manufacturer: Mauser Werke AG

Specifications
- Mass: 718 kg (1,583 lb)
- Length: 4.16 m (13.6 ft)
- Barrel length: 2.825 m (9 ft 3.2 in)
- Cartridge: Fixed QF 50×420mm R
- Cartridge weight: 1,54 kg
- Caliber: 50 mm (1.969 in)
- Rate of fire: 150 rounds/min
- Muzzle velocity: 920 m/s (3,000 ft/s)
- Feed system: 30 round

The MK 214A was a 50 mm (1.969 in) calibre auto-cannon designed by Mauser Werke AG, for use on Messerschmitt Me 262 and Me 410 bomber-destroyers.

Intended for use on the Messerschmitt Me 262A-1a/U4, Mauser designed the MK 214, derived from the 5 cm Pak 38 anti-tank gun. Initial trials with the MK 214 revealed it to be over-complicated, so a refined version was developed as the MK 214A, flight tests of which were carried out from February 1945 by Karl Baur, but the weapon was not deployed operationally.

A similar installation using the BK 5 cannon was also planned.
