= Fritz X =

WWII radio guided bomb developed by Nazi Germany

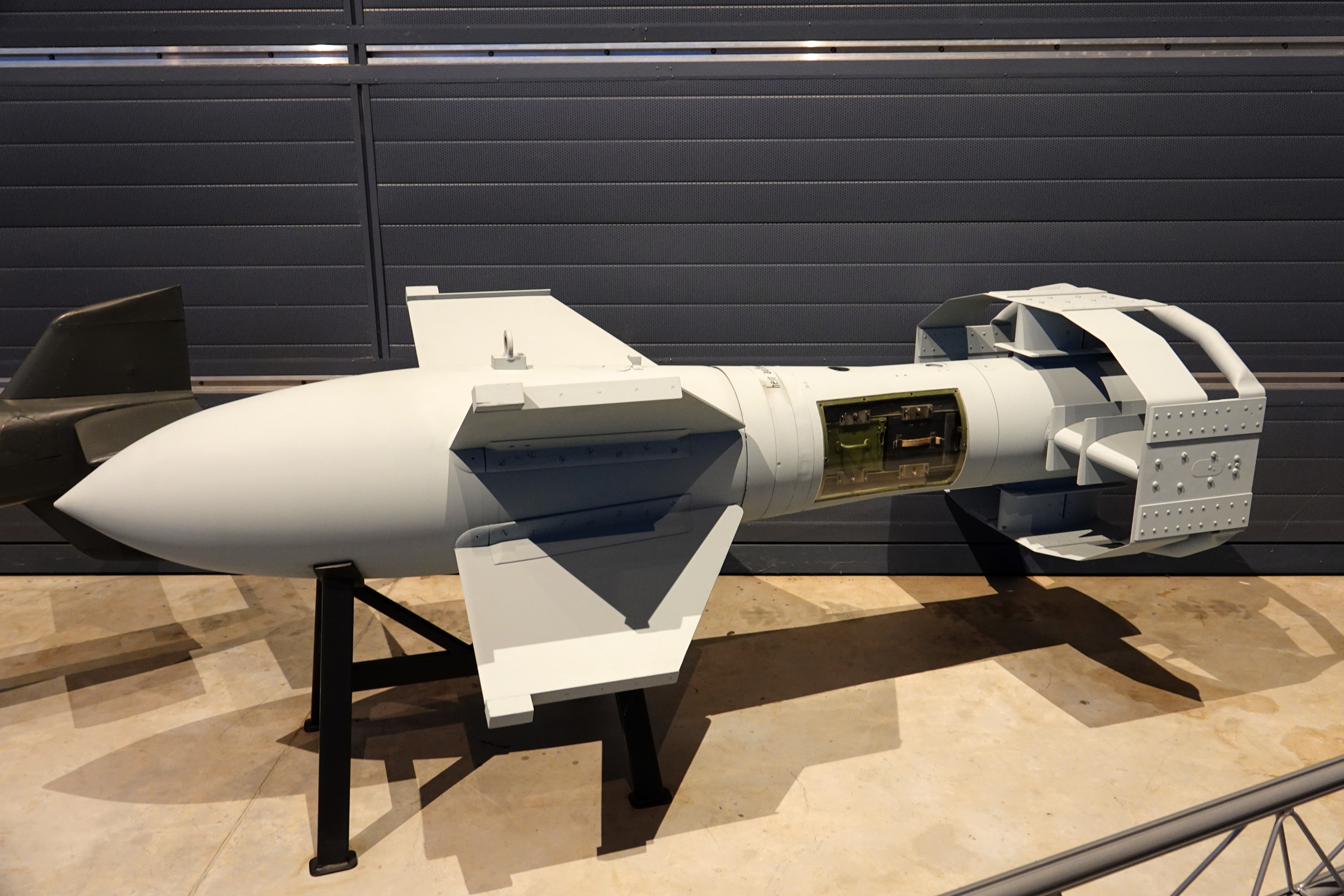
- Fritz X guided bomb
- Type: Anti-ship glide bomb
- Place of origin: Nazi Germany

Service history
- In service: 1943–44
- Used by: Nazi Germany (Luftwaffe)
- Wars: World War II

Production history
- Designer: Max Kramer
- Designed: 1938–1943
- Manufacturer: Ruhrstahl
- No. built: 1,400

Specifications
- Mass: 1,570 kg (3,460 lb)
- Length: 3.32 m (10.9 ft)
- Width: 1.4 m (4.6 ft)
- Diameter: 85.3 cm (33.6 in)
- Warhead: amatol explosive, armour-piercing
- Warhead weight: 320 kg (710 lb)
- Operational range: 5 km (3.1 mi)
- Maximum speed: 343 m/s (1,130 ft/s) 1,235 km/h (767 mph)
- Guidance system: Kehl-Straßburg FuG 203/230; MCLOS

Fritz X was a German guided anti-ship glide bomb used during World War II. Developed alongside the Henschel Hs 293, Fritz X was one of the first precision guided weapons deployed in combat. Fritz X was a nickname used both by Allied and Luftwaffe personnel. Alternative names include Ruhrstahl SD 1400 X, Kramer X-1, PC 1400X or FX 1400 (the latter, along with the unguided PC 1400 Fritz nickname, is the origin for the name "Fritz X").

== History ==
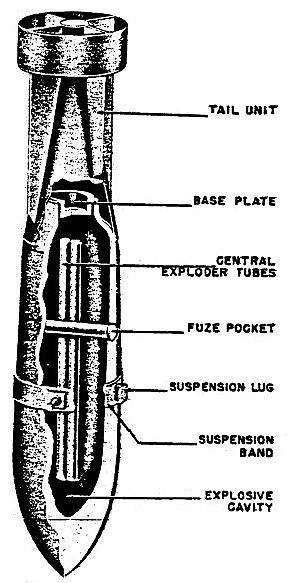
American drawing of the PC 1400 armour-piercing bomb, the basis for the Fritz X PGM

Fritz X was a further development of the PC 1400 (Panzersprengbombe, Cylindrisch 1,400 kg) (Note: German Wikipedia's WW II PC-series bomb specifications, German for "armour-piercing bomb, cylindrical".) armour-piercing high-explosive bomb, itself bearing the nickname Fritz. It was a penetration weapon intended to be used against armoured targets such as heavy cruisers and battleships. It was given a more aerodynamic nose, four stub wings, and a box-shaped tail unit consisting of a roughly 12-sided annular set of fixed surfaces and a cruciform tail with thick surfaces within the annulus, which contained the Fritz X's aerodynamic controls.

The Luftwaffe recognised the difficulty of hitting moving ships during the Spanish Civil War. German engineer Max Kramer, who worked at the Deutsche Versuchsanstalt für Luftfahrt (DVL), had been experimenting since 1938 with remote-controlled free-falling 250 kg (550 lb) bombs and in 1939 fitted radio-controlled spoilers. In 1940, Ruhrstahl AG was invited to join the development, since they already had experience in the development and production of unguided bombs.

Fritz X was guided by a Kehl-Straßburg radio control link, which sent signals to the movable spoilers in the thick vertical and horizontal tail fin surfaces, within the annular tail fin structure. This control system was also used for the unarmoured, rocket-boosted Henschel Hs 293 anti-ship ordnance, first deployed on 25 August 1943. The Straßburg receiver antenna installations on the Fritz X were aerodynamically integrated into the trailing edge of the annular surfaces of the tail fin, non-metallically encapsulated within four "bulged" sections in the trailing edge. This design feature of the FuG 230 Straßburg receiver installation is like the Azon (US contemporary guided bomb), which had its receiving antennas placed in the four diagonal struts bracing the fixed sections of its tail fins.

Minimum launch height was 4,000 m (13,000 ft) – although 5,500 m (18,000 ft) was preferred – and a range of 5 km (3.1 mi; 2.7 nmi) was necessary. As it was an MCLOS-guidance ordnance design, the operator had to keep the bomb in sight at all times (a tail flare was provided, as with the Azon, to assist the operator in tracking the weapon) and the control aircraft had to hold course, which made evading gunfire or fighters impossible. Approximately 1,400 examples, including trial models, were produced.

== Control setup ==
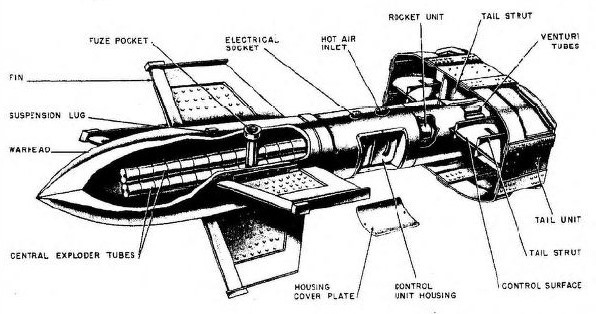
Fritz X schematic

The Fritz X possessed a spoiler-based control setup on its tail fin unit, using three sets of aerodynamic control spoiler systems, with two of them giving control in the pitch and yaw axes, differentially operating and constantly oscillating rapidly under direct control from the Kehl-Straßburg radio control link. The roll control setup, operating autonomously and not under control from the deploying aircraft, oscillated similarly to those under the externally controlled sets, and were on the outboard sections of the horizontal tailfin surfaces within the annular set of outer tailfin surfaces. These were like the American Azon ordnance's aileron control surfaces in their purpose, commanded by an internal gyroscope in the tail's central housing in both the Azon and Fritz X, to keep the ordnance level during its trajectory. The inboard set of spoiler surfaces in the tailfin's horizontal surfaces, which used a set of wing fence-like flat surfaces for airflow separation from the autonomous roll control spoilers, controlled the pitch angle after release and were controlled by the radio control link, giving the Fritz X's bombardier in the deploying aircraft the ability to control the range of the drop, a capability that the Azon did not have. The yaw control spoilers housed in the vertical tail fin surfaces were also under control through the radio link, and had similar "fence" surfaces to guide airflow over them. All three spoiler surface sets barely protruded from the surface during operation, with the pair of spoiler systems under external control having a degree of "proportionality" in their operation by varying the "dwell time" spent on one side or the other during their rapid rate of oscillation from side to side when a control input was sent to them.

== Combat procedure ==
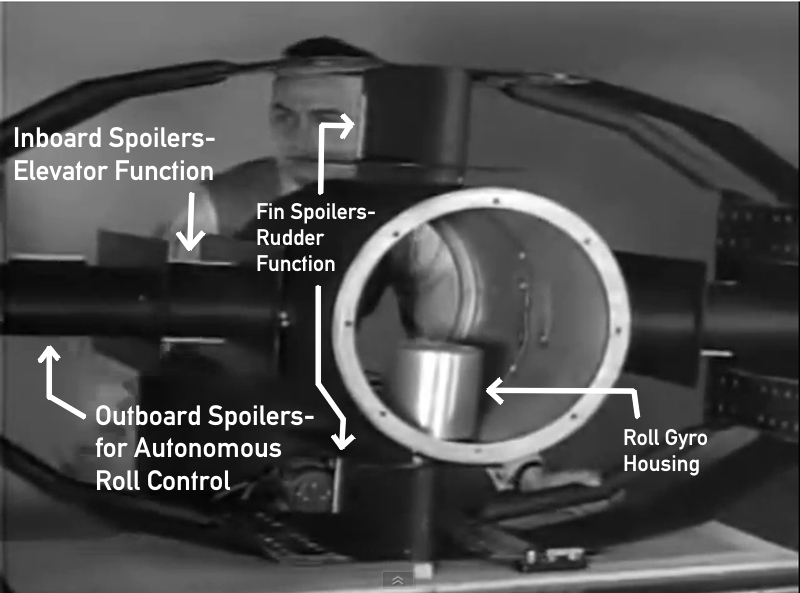
Annotated still from a 1946 USAAF-published film on Fritz X showing the location of control spoilers and autonomous roll gyro

The Fritz X was steered by the bombardier in the launching aircraft over a radio link between the aircraft's Kehl transmitter and the weapon's Straßburg receiver. The bombardier had to be able to see the target at all times, and like the Azon, the Fritz X had a flare in the tail so it could be seen from the controlling aircraft for its MCLOS-form guidance to control it properly. The disadvantage with this — in comparison to fully autonomous-guidance glide bombs like the operational U.S. Navy's Bat radar-homing glide bomb, used against Japan in 1944–45 — were that the aircraft had to be flown towards the target on a steady course and that as the missile neared its target it became possible to misguide it by jamming its radio channel.

Unlike the Hs 293, which was deployed against merchant ships and light escort warships, the Fritz X was intended to be used against armoured ships such as heavy cruisers and battleships. The Fritz X had to be released at least 5 kilometres (3 mi) from the target. The plane had to decelerate immediately after bomb release so the bombardier could see the bomb and guide it; this deceleration was achieved by making a steep climb and then levelling out. The bombardier could make a maximum correction of 500 metres (1,600 ft) in range and 350 metres (1,150 ft) in bearing. The bomber was vulnerable to fighter attack and ship-based air defence weapons while maintaining a slow, steady course so the bombardier could maintain visual contact to guide the bomb. When working properly, the missile was able to pierce 130 mm (5.1 in) of armor.

Accuracy is the main reason for developing a weapon system of this kind, rather than continuing to use unguided bombs. A skilled bombardier could guide 50% of the bombs to within a 15 m (50 ft) radius of the aiming point, and about 90% hit within a 30 m (100 ft) radius (some sources say 60% hit within 4.6 metre radius).

== Usage in combat ==
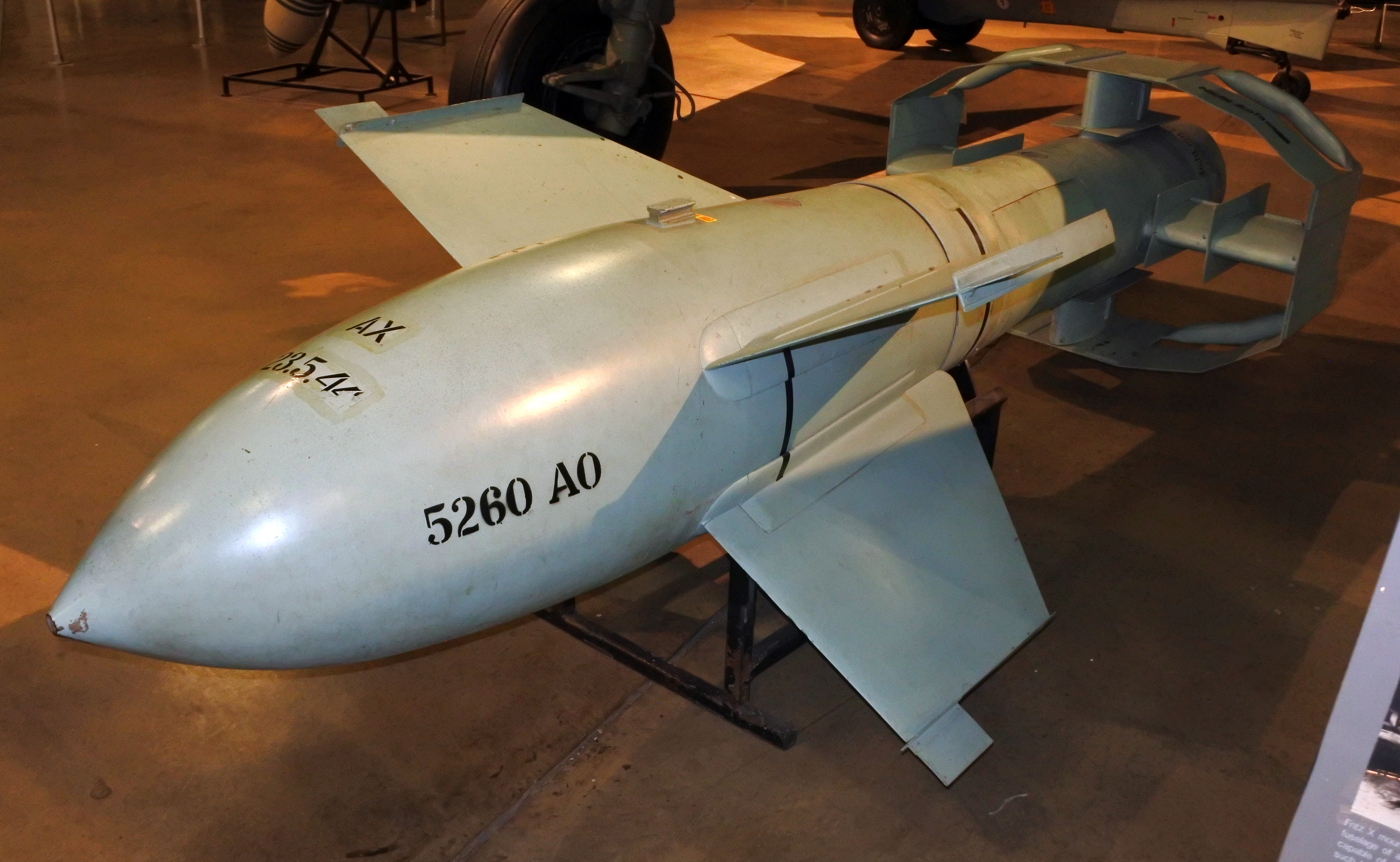
Fritz X guided bomb at the National Museum of the United States Air Force

The only Luftwaffe unit to deploy the Fritz X was Gruppe III of Kampfgeschwader 100 Wiking (Viking), designated III./KG 100; the bomber wing itself evolved as the larger-sized descendant of the earlier Kampfgruppe 100 unit in mid-December 1941. This unit employed the medium range Dornier Do 217K-2 bomber on almost all of its attack missions; in a few cases near the end of its deployment history, Dornier Do 217K-3 and M-11 variants were also used. The Fritz X had been initially tested with a Heinkel He 111 bomber, but was never taken into combat by this aircraft. A few special variants of the troublesome Heinkel He 177A Greif long-range bomber were equipped with the Kehl transmitter and proper bombracks to carry the Fritz X, and it is thought that this combination might have seen limited combat service, at least with the combinations known to have been involved in test drops. It was found that the launch aircraft had to "toss" the bomb slightly, climbing and then descending, to keep it in view ahead.

The Fritz X was first deployed on 21 July 1943 in a raid on Augusta harbour in Sicily. Several attacks around Sicily and Messina followed, but no confirmed hits were made and it appears the Allies were unaware that the large bombs being dropped were radio-guided weapons.

On 9 September, the Luftwaffe achieved their greatest success with the weapon. After Pietro Badoglio publicly announced the Italian armistice with the Allies on 8 September 1943, the Italian fleet had left La Spezia and headed to Tunisia. To prevent the ships from falling into Allied hands, six Do 217K-2s from III. Gruppe of KG 100 (III/KG 100) took off, each carrying a single Fritz X. The Italian battleship Roma, flagship of the Italian fleet, received two hits and one near miss, and sank after her magazines exploded. 1,393 men, including Admiral Carlo Bergamini, died. Her sister ship, Italia, was also seriously damaged but reached Tunisia.

The American light cruiser USS Savannah was hit by Fritz Xs at 10:00 AM on 11 September 1943 during the invasion of Salerno, and was forced to retire to the United States for eight months of repairs. A single Fritz X passed through the roof of "C" turret and killed the turret crew and a damage control party when it exploded in the lower ammunition-handling room. The blast tore a large hole in the ship's bottom, opened a seam in her side, and blew out all fires in her boiler rooms. Savannah lay dead in the water with her forecastle nearly awash, and eight hours elapsed before her boilers were relit, allowing the ship to get under way for Malta. USS Savannah lost 197 crewmen in this attack. Fifteen other sailors were seriously wounded, and four more were trapped in a watertight compartment for 60 hours. These four sailors were rescued when Savannah had arrived at Grand Harbor, Valletta, Malta on 12 September.

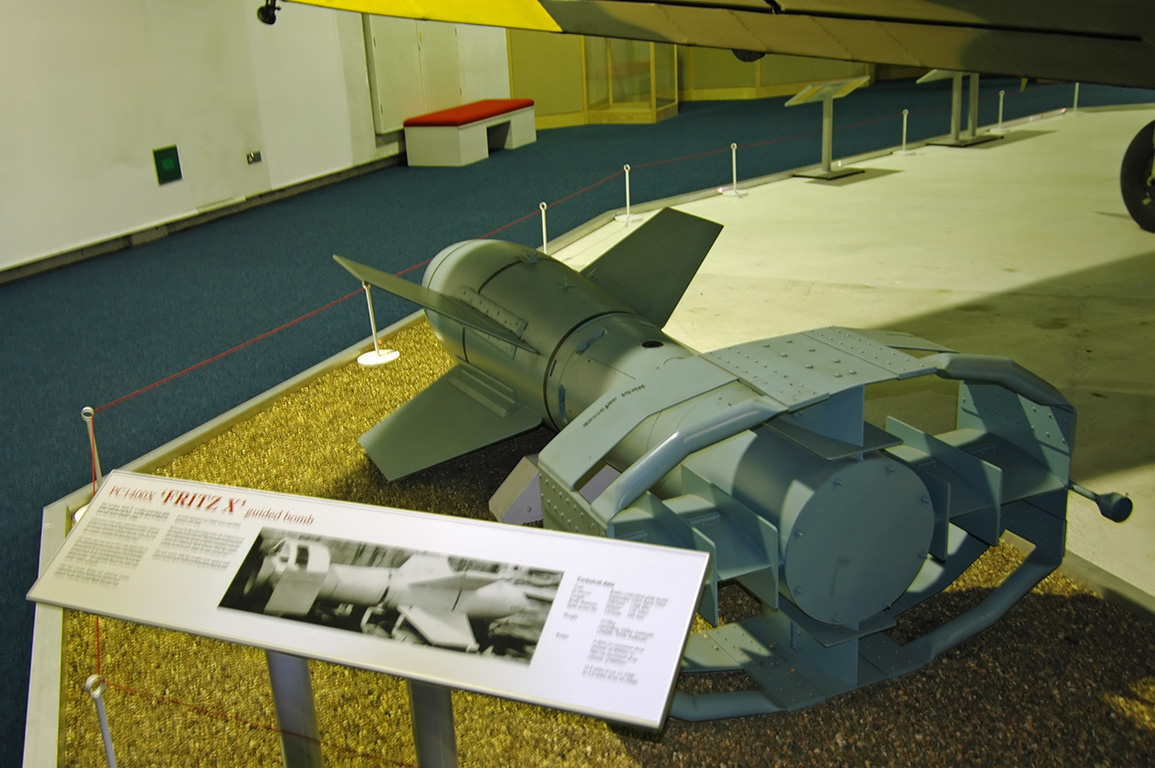
Rear view

Savannah's sister ship, USS Philadelphia, had been targeted earlier the same morning. The Fritz X just missed the ship, exploding about 15 metres away. Damage was minimal.

The Royal Navy's light cruiser HMS Uganda was hit by a Fritz X off Salerno at 14:40 on 13 September. The Fritz X passed through seven decks and straight through her keel, exploding underwater just under the keel. The concussive shock of the Fritz X's underwater detonation close to Uganda's hull extinguished all her boiler fires, and resulted in sixteen men being killed, with Uganda taking on 1,300 tons of water. Uganda was towed to Malta for repairs.

Two merchant ships may have been hit by Fritz X bombs at Salerno, though the evidence is uncertain. SS Bushrod Washington was hit by a glide bomb, either a Fritz X or a Hs 293, on 14 September while offloading a cargo of fuel. (Note: It remains uncertain today the exact cause of the loss of Bushrod Washington. Most accounts credit the attack to an Hs 293 launched from II./KG 100, and it is known from Luftwaffe records that II./KG 100 was active above Salerno around that time, flying nine missions from 9 to 30 September, three of them during the day. Eyewitness descriptions indicate that the side of the ship was blown out, more consistent with an Hs 293 attack than a Fritz X. The situation is further confused because original reports, possibly contrived to avoid mention of the glide bombs in accordance with U.S. policy at the time, suggest two conventional 250 kg bombs dropped from dive bombers were responsible.) SS James W. Marshall was set on fire by a conventional bomb, Hs 293 or Fritz X on 15 September. As with Bushrod Washington, the nature of the weapon that damaged James W. Marshall is uncertain. A witness aboard a ship nearby, Joseph A. Yannacci, attributes the attack to Ju 87 "Stuka" dive bombers, which were too small to carry glide bombs. An attack with a Fritz X cannot be ruled out, but there is at least an equal case that, if a glide bomb was involved, it was an Hs 293 from II./KG 100; Luftwaffe records show that II./KG 100, armed only with Hs 293 glide bombs, was active over Salerno that day.

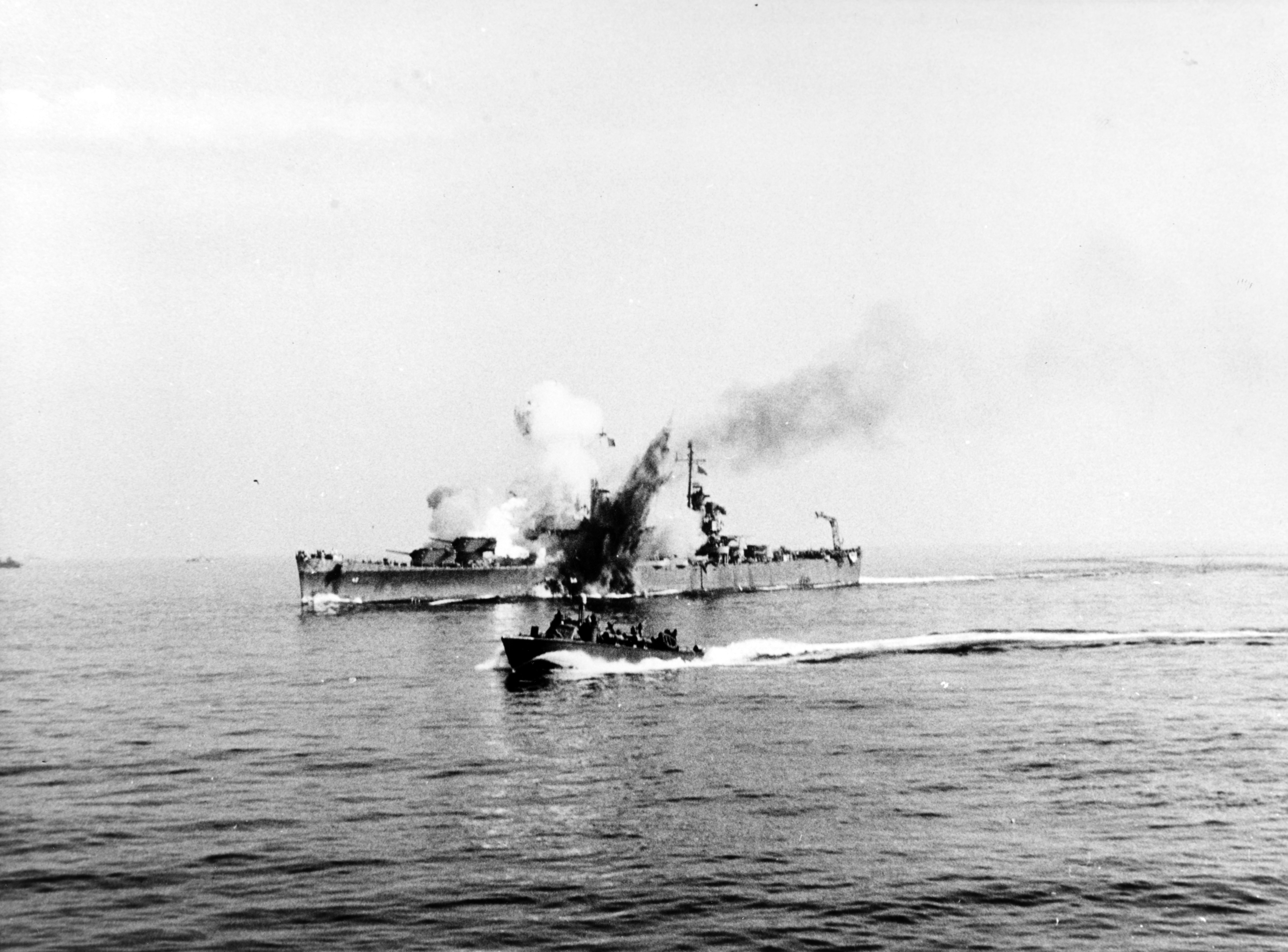
Savannah hit by a Fritz X during the Salerno landings

KG 100 achieved another success with Fritz X while the British battleship HMS Warspite was providing gunfire support at Salerno on 16 September. One bomb penetrated six decks before exploding in number 4 boiler room. This explosion put out all fires and blew out the double bottom. A second Fritz X near-missed Warspite, holing her at the waterline. She took on a total of 5,000 tonnes of water and lost steam and consequently all power, both to the ship herself and to all her systems, but although the damage had been considerable, Warspite's casualties amounted to only nine killed and fourteen wounded. She was towed to Malta by tugs Hopi and Moreno, then returned to Britain via Gibraltar and was out of action for nearly 9 months; she was never completely repaired, but returned to action to bombard German positions in Normandy during Operation Overlord.

The last Fritz X attack at Salerno lightly damaged the US light cruiser Philadelphia with two near misses on 17 September. This attack is sometimes reported as taking place on 18 September but US Navy records show the cruiser Philadelphia departed Salerno the night of 17/18 September. According to Luftwaffe records, III./KG 100, the Luftwaffe unit armed with the Fritz X, flew its last mission on 17 September. Other ships damaged by Fritz-X included Dutch sloop Flores and British destroyer Loyal.

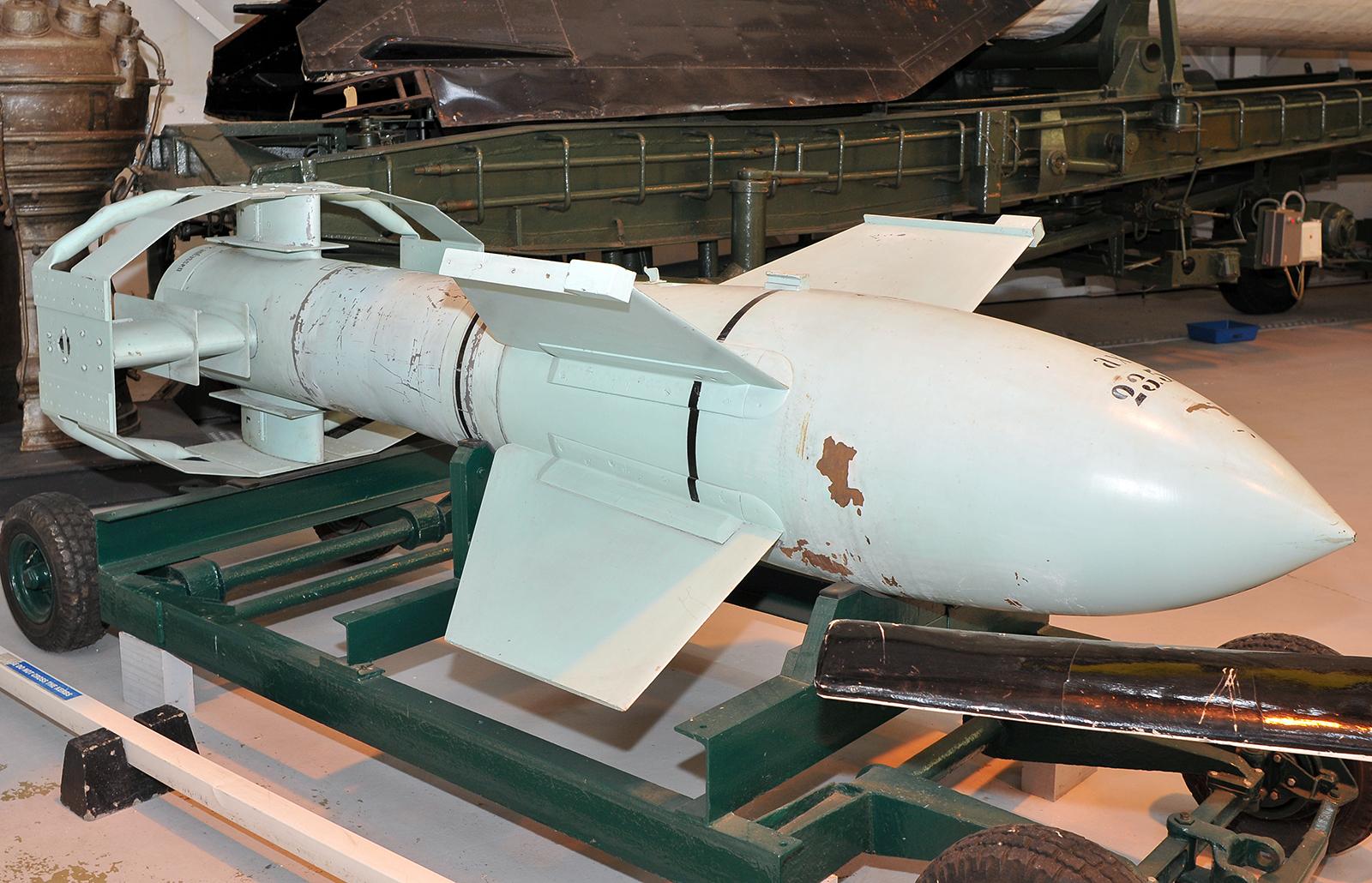
Fritz X at RAF Museum Cosford

=== Electronic countermeasures ===
The control system used by the Fritz X relied on radio contact between the bomb and the guidance unit, and was susceptible to electronic countermeasures. After the initial attacks in August 1943, the Allies went to considerable effort to develop jamming devices. These were first deployed in late September 1943, too late for Salerno. The system met with some success, but proved cumbersome and easily overwhelmed if large numbers of weapons were deployed simultaneously.

In early 1944, as the British and US Armies were engaged in the Battle of Anzio, the United Kingdom began to deploy its Type 650 transmitter, which employed a different approach to interfering with the FuG 203/230 radio link on a Fritz X, by jamming the Straßburg receiver's intermediate frequency (IF) section. The FuG 230 receiver's IF section operated at 3 MHz, and the Type 650 appears to have been quite successful in interfering with Fritz X ordnance deployments, especially because the operator did not have to attempt to find which of the eighteen selected Kehl-Straßburg command frequencies were in use and then manually tune the jamming transmitter to one of them. The Type 650 automatically defeated the receiver, regardless which radio frequency had been selected for a missile.

By the time of the Normandy landings, a combination of Allied air supremacy (keeping the Luftwaffe's bombers at bay) and ship-mounted jammers meant that the Fritz X had no significant effect on the invasion fleet. Some accounts report that the Norwegian destroyer Svenner was hit by a Fritz X at dawn on D-Day. This is unlikely, as III./KG 100, the unit which had carried the Fritz X into combat, had largely been re-equipped with the Hs 293 by that time for its anti-ship missions, and the attack on Svenner occurred before the first glide bombers launched their assaults on the Normandy beaches.

The Fritz X has been credited as responsible for the loss of the hospital ship HMHS Newfoundland at Salerno as well as the destroyer HMS Janus and the light cruiser HMS Spartan at Anzio, but these ships were hit by Hs 293s, as demonstrated by the nature of the damage inflicted, as well as by reports from witnesses (in the case of Janus, either an Hs 293 or a conventional torpedo was responsible).

== Operators ==
- Luftwaffe (Nazi Germany)

== See also ==
- List of World War II guided missiles of Germany
- Kramer X4- Max Kramer's air-to-air guided missile
- Ki-147
- Ki-148
- Ohka
- Project Pigeon
- Gargoyle
- GB-4
- GB-8
- VB-3 Razon
- Hs 293
