= Max Kramer =

German-American scientist

- Born: Max Otto Kramer; 8 September 1903; Cologne, North Rhine-Westphalia, Germany
- Died: June 1986 (aged 82); Pacific Palisades, Los Angeles, California, United States
- Occupation: Scientist

Max Otto Kramer (8 September 1903 – June 1986) was a German-American scientist who worked for the Ruhrstahl AG steel and armaments corporation. He was responsible for the construction of the Fritz X and the Ruhrstahl X-4 missiles (1943-1945), among others.

== Personal background ==
Max Otto Kramer was born on 8 September 1903 in Cologne, Germany, earned a degree in electronic engineering at the Technical College of Munich in 1926 and received his doctorate in aeronautics from the Technical College of Aachen in 1931. Already by the late 1930s he was an authority on aerodynamics, working at the German Institute of Aeronautics in Berlin, and holding patents for important innovations related to aircraft, such as landing flaps. His specialty was in the modeling of complex airflows, especially those related to laminar-flow dynamics.

== Early research in Germany ==
Kramer had a wide range of interests and his work encompassed automobiles, gliders, propeller noise, acoustic missile and wake tracking, and underwater coatings. However, he is best known for the development of the Ruhrstahl X-1 "Fritz-X" glide bomb, a radio-controlled bomb whose descent could be adjusted. This bomb was deployed a number of times in late 1943 and early 1944, achieving several successes before Allied air superiority and electronic countermeasures rendered it ineffective. Notable amongst its successes were the sinking of the Italian battleship Roma and the infliction of severe damage upon the British battleship HMS Warspite, the American light cruiser USS Savannah and the British light cruiser HMS Uganda.

Kramer continued to evolve the basic Ruhrstahl X-1 design during the war. One direction of research was to improve the ability of this weapon to penetrate the heavy armor of modern battleships of the British King George V and the American North Carolina classes. The X-2 and X-3 variants of the weapon did so by achieving even higher descent speeds into the transonic range without losing directional stability. The X-5 and substituted greater explosive power for descent speed, with a total weight approaching 2,250 kg. The X-6 attempted to overcome heavy deck armor with a very heavy steel tip and an enhanced explosive charge. None of the variants ever made it into large-scale production or operational use.

One of Kramer's most renowned development efforts involved the Ruhrstahl X-4, also known as the Kramer X-4. This was a highly innovative air-to-air missile, designed to be guided by airborne operators into the midst of Allied bomber formations. As such it was a precursor to the air-to-air guided missiles developed in the post-war period. Developed late in the war, X-4 does not appear to have been used in combat.

== Post-war activities in the United States ==
Kramer relocated to the United States after World War II as part of Operation Paperclip. From 1947 to 1952 he worked for the Pilotless Aircraft Laboratory at the Naval Air Development Station in Johnsville, Pennsylvania conducting research on autonomous air vehicles and missiles and building upon his research on the X-4.

Kramer left government employment in 1952 to take a position as Technical Director with Coleman Engineering Company where his work focused on the highly efficient movement of structures through fluids via creation of laminar flows. He often reported that on crossing the Atlantic he noticed dolphins have a shape implying laminar flow and that this was the inspiration for his research. However, he had been researching laminar-flow issues long before he came to the U.S. After ten years of effort he discovered that a compliant coating, such as the skin of a dolphin would dampen any turbulent tendencies resulting from movement through water. He claimed that a 30% reduction in drag was possible, but subsequent researchers were unable to duplicate these results, leading to what has been called "The Kramer Controversy." Over time, as more research on the topic has been conducted, scientists have gradually confirmed Dr. Kramer's pioneering views.

In 1956, in order to monetize Kramer's research on “Boundary Layer Stabilization by Distributed Damping,” Coleman Engineering and Kramer founded a jointly owned company, Coleman-Kramer, Inc. The result of this combined effort was a new material designed to reduce drag in underwater vehicles emulating the compliant skin of porpoises. In 1957 the technology was licensed to US Rubber Co. for manufacturing, under the trademark Lamiflo. The U.S. Navy wasn't interested in this material, so Kramer patented it. Later the Federal Bureau of Investigation claimed he sold it to the Russians.

Kramer died in June 1986 in Pacific Palisades, California.
