= Karl Baur =

German test pilot, flight instructor and engineer

- Born: November 13, 1911; Laichingen, Württemberg, Germany
- Died: October 12, 1963 (aged 51); Arlington, Texas, United States of America
- Known for: Chief Test Pilot for Messerschmitt; Instructor Pilot

Karl Baur (November 13, 1911 – October 12, 1963) was a German test pilot, flight instructor and engineer. His friends referred to him truly as "A Pilot's Pilot".

== Early life ==
Karl Baur was born November 13, 1911, in Laichingen, Württemberg, Germany. In 1927 he attended a summer camp for young boys interested in aviation, and it was here that Baur developed his desire to fly. He became involved in the world of glider flying during the 1930s, where with the F1 Fledermaus glider he completed the necessary distance, height, and acrobatic flying requirements to earn an International Silver C Badge in 1934. (Only 19 of these were awarded at that year, and Baur was one of 15 Germans who received the badge.) Baur also worked with powered aircraft and earned a private pilot license in 1931.

== Instructor Pilot ==
In 1935 Baur accepted an opportunity to go to Japan and serve as instructor at a Japanese glider school. He also did some acrobatic flying at various points around Japan, as well as a flight over the erupting volcano Mount Asama from a distance of 50 meters.

Upon his return to Germany in 1936, Baur completed his master's degree in Aeronautical Engineering (Dipl. Ing.) and went to work for the Deutsche Luftfahrtforschungsanstalt (DLA/German Aeronautical Research Institute) testing aircraft designs and instructing German pilots. Baur was called to military duty and attempted to join the Luftwaffe in 1938, but because of problems with his eyesight he could not pass the physical to be certified as a military pilot. He stayed with the German Aeronautical Research Institute until 1939, when he received an offer to become the Chief Test Pilot for the Messerschmitt Company.

== Test Pilot and Engineer ==
At Messerschmitt he test piloted such famous aircraft as the Bf 109, the Me 262 jet fighter, and the Me 163 rocket plane. Here is a partial list of aircraft he flew:

- Bf 109
- Messerschmitt Me 209
- Messerschmitt Me 309
- Me 210 - Me 410
- Messerschmitt Me 261
- Me 264 Amerikabomber contract contender
- Me 321 Gigant
- Me 323
- Me 163 Komet
- Me 262 jet fighter including C-series rocket-boosted Heimatschützer I and II variants

On April 29, 1945, the Allies captured the German city of Augsburg, where Baur was working on Messerschmitt aircraft. Baur and his crew were required by the American forces to repair the Me 262s that had been damaged and instruct some American pilots in their operation. Along with other German experts in the field of aeronautics and rocketry, Baur was sent to the United States in fall of 1945 during Operation Paperclip. He spent several months in the United States demonstrating the Me 262 providing technical help to American test pilots, and explaining about the aeronautic work he had done in Germany. In December 1945 Baur was able to return to Germany and reunite with his family.

Baur worked several odd jobs after the war, including serving an interpreter to the commander of an American Army Air Force Base in Germany, and as a sales representative for a company that manufactured car batteries. Baur accepted a job as an engineer at the Chance Vought Aircraft Corporation in Dallas, Texas, in August 1954. Baur worked for Chance Vought until his death on October 12, 1963. His widow, Isolde Baur lived in the Dallas-Fort Worth area until her death on June 5, 2006.

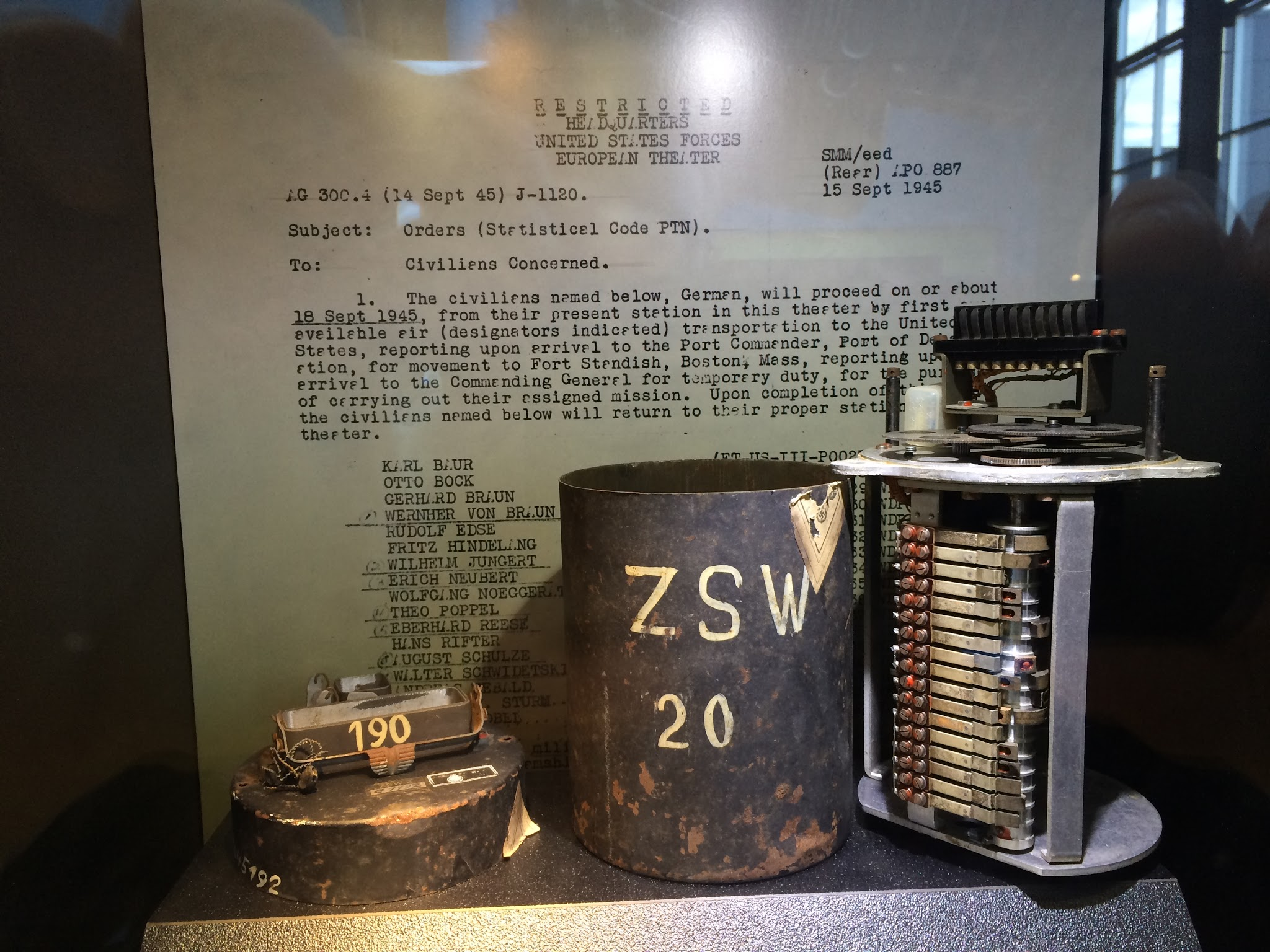
