= Ruhrstahl X-4 =

WWII guided missile developed by Nazi Germany

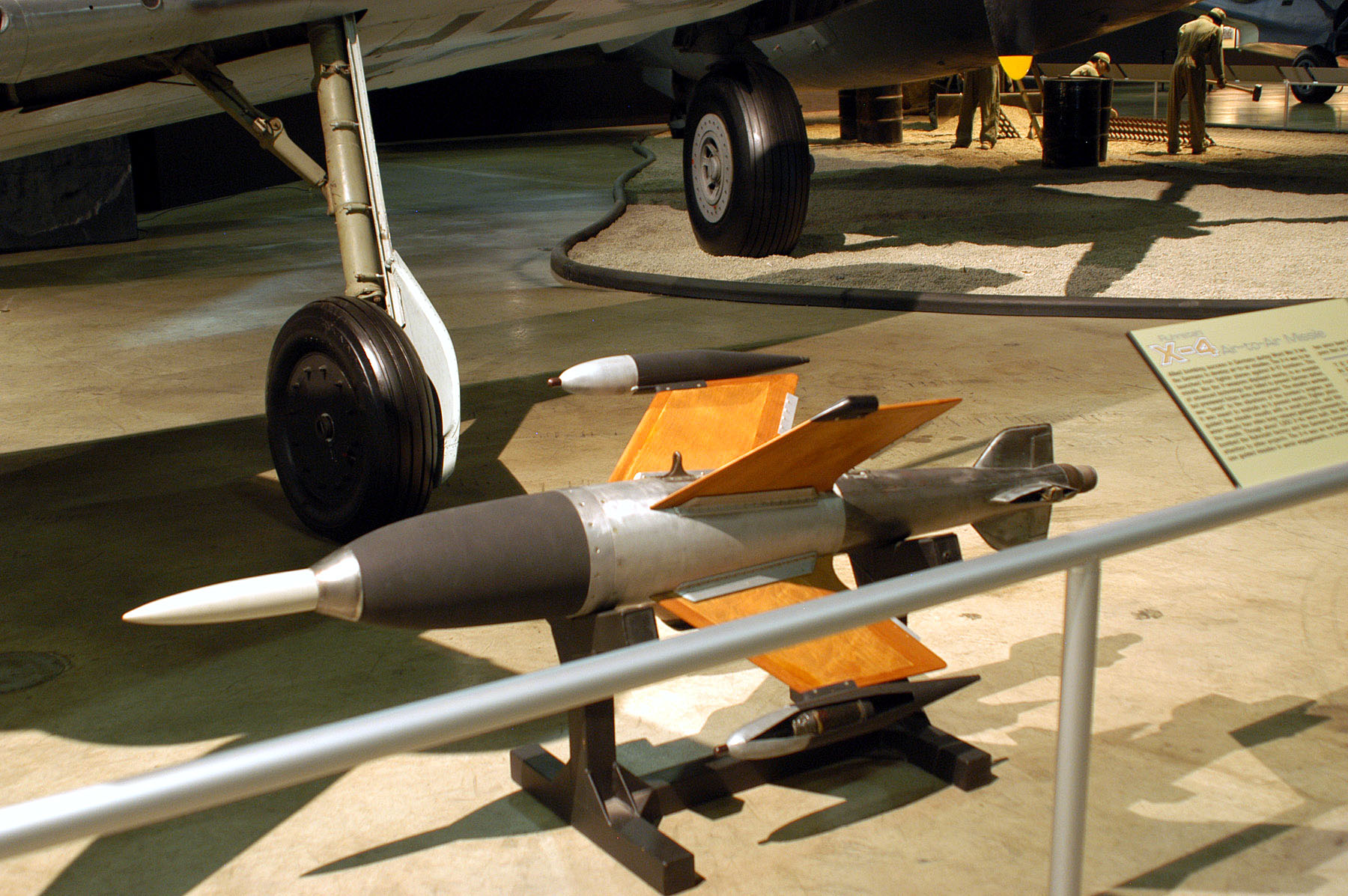
- Surviving example at the NMUSAF
- Type: Air-to-air missile
- Place of origin: Nazi Germany

Service history
- In service: Not operational
- Wars: World War II

Production history
- Manufacturer: Ruhrstahl AG
- Developed into: Ruhrstahl X-7

The Ruhrstahl Ru 344 X-4 or Ruhrstahl-Kramer RK 344 was a wire-guided air-to-air missile designed by Germany during World War II. The X-4 did not see operational service and thus was not proven in combat but inspired considerable post-war work around the world, and was the basis for the development of several ground-launched anti-tank missiles.

== History ==
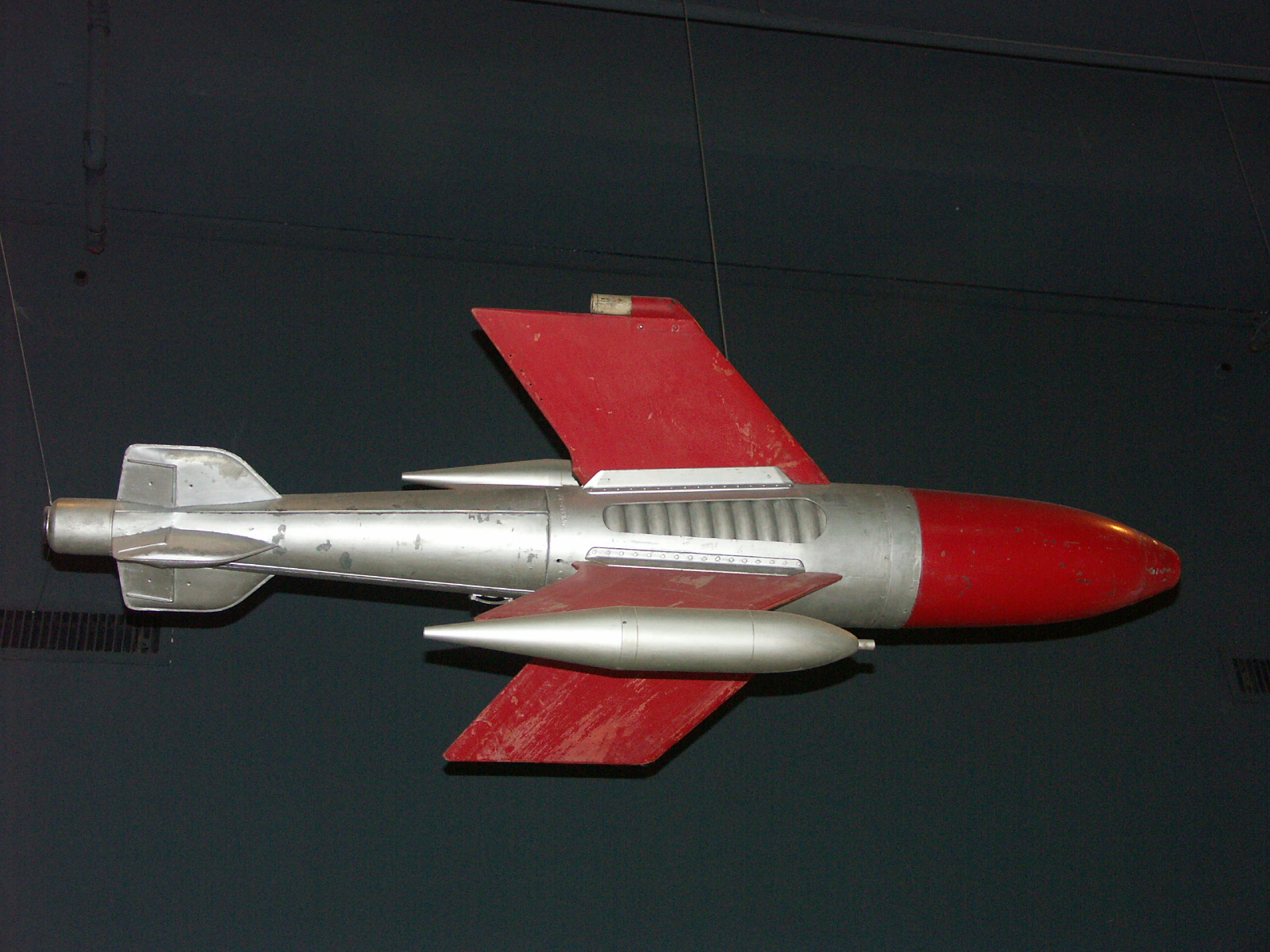
Kramer X4 (Deutsches Museum in Munich)

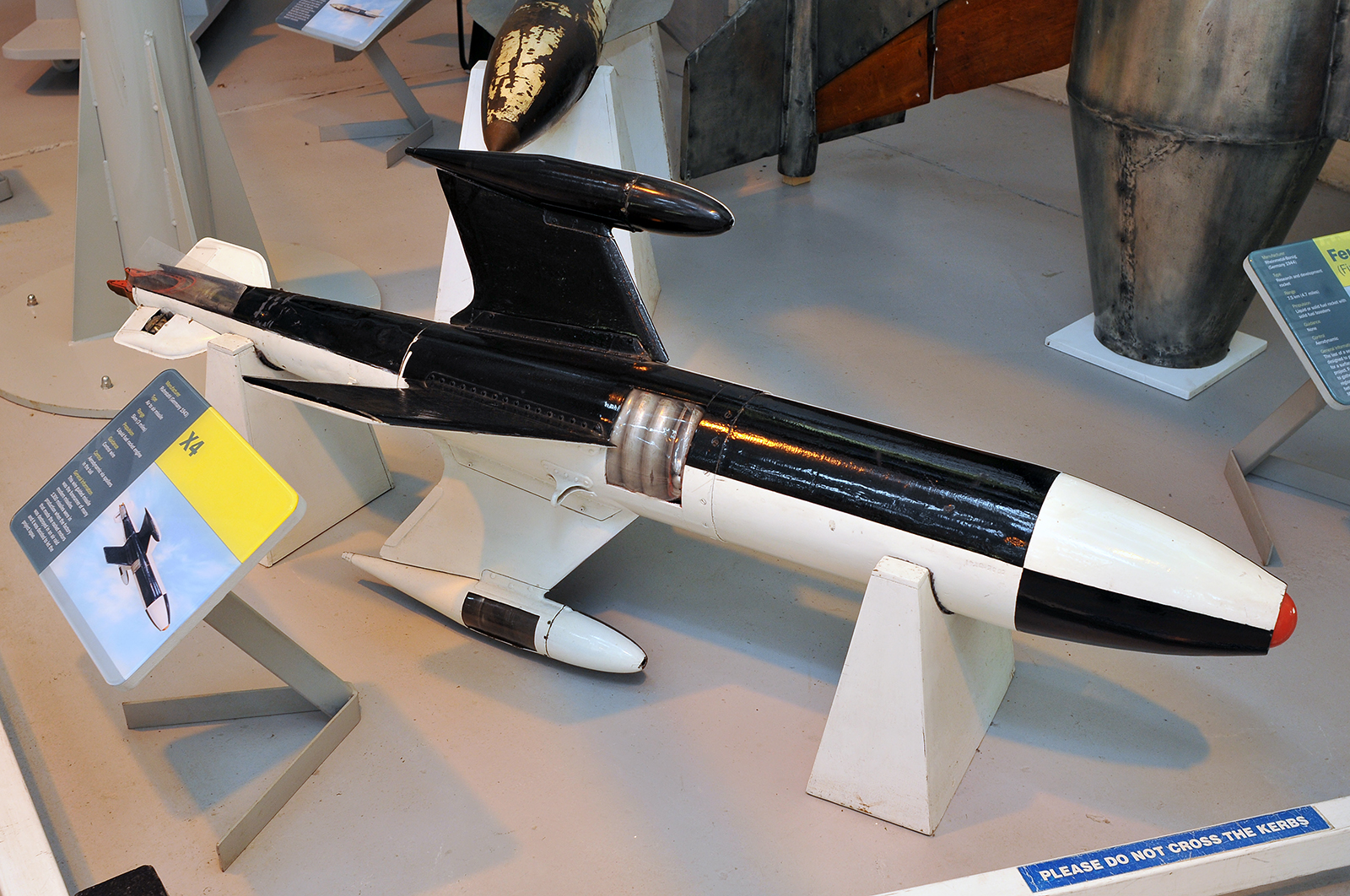
Ruhrstahl X-4 in RAF Museum Cosford

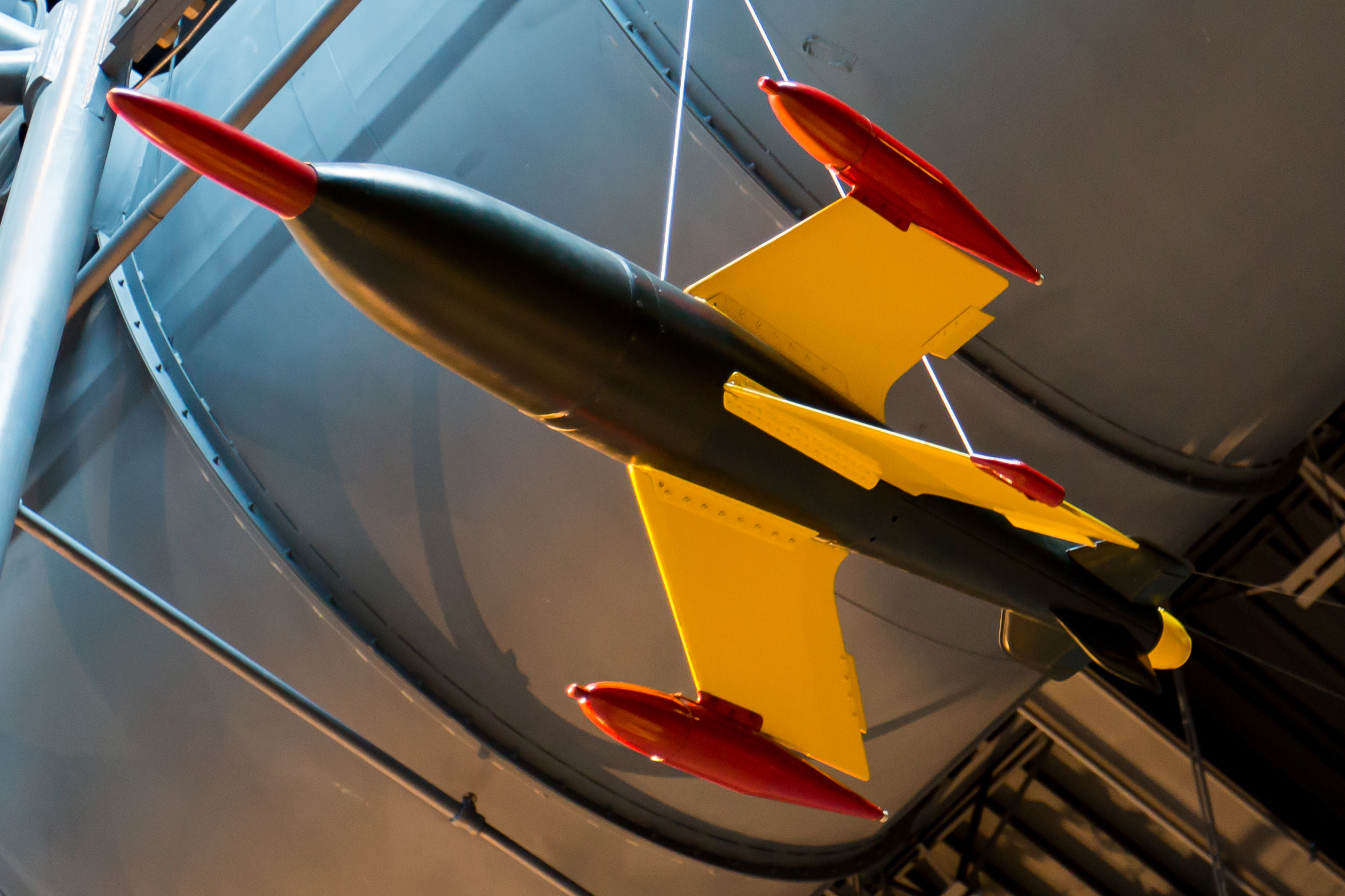
A Ruhrstahl X-4 on display at the Udvar-Hazy Center.

During 1943, the RAF's Bomber Command and the US Army Air Force mounted a series of heavy raids against Germany. Despite heavy bomber losses, these prompted Luftwaffe research into considerably more powerful anti-bomber weaponry in order to reduce the cost in lost fighter aircraft and aircrew. A massive development effort resulted in a number of heavy-calibre autocannon designs, air-to-air rockets, SAMs, and the X-4.

Work on the X-4 began in June 1943, by Max Kramer at Ruhrstahl AG. The idea was to build a missile with enough range to allow it to be fired from outside the range of the bombers' guns (a concept now known as stand-off weaponry). The bombers' defensive guns had a maximum effective range of about 1,000 m (3,300 ft). The missile was to be guided with enough accuracy to guarantee a "kill". The X-4 met these specifications and more. Its BMW 109-448 rocket motor accelerated the missile to over 1,150 km/h (710 mph) and kept the X-4 at this speed during its "cruise", between 1.5 and 4 km (0.9 and 2.5 mi).

The rocket burned a hypergolic mixture of S-Stoff (nitric acid with 5% iron(III) chloride) and R-Stoff (an organic amine-mixture of 50% dimethylaminobenzene and 50% triethylamine called Tonka 250) as propellant, delivering 140 kg (310 lb) thrust initially, declining to 30 kg (66 lb) over the 17-second burn. As there was no room for a fuel pump, the fuel components were forced into the motor by pistons inside long tubes, the tubes being coiled (similar to a coil spring) to fit inside the airframe. S-Stoff was so corrosive, it dissolved all base metals and was extremely difficult and dangerous to handle. The Germans planned to replace the motor with a solid fuel design as soon as possible.

The missile was spin-stabilized at about 60 rpm or one rotation a second, so any asymmetrical thrust from the engine or inaccuracies in the control surfaces would be evened out. Signals to operate control surfaces on the tail were sent via two wires (a method chosen to avoid radio jamming), which unwound from bobbins housed within long, bullet-shaped fairings, themselves mounted either on the roots of an opposing pair of the larger mid-body fins (there were four, swept 45°), or on one pair of those same fins' opposing tips; these contained a total of about 5.5 km (3.4 mi; 3.0 nmi) of wire. The wires were controlled by a joystick in the cockpit. A gyroscope kept track of "up" so control inputs from the pilot's joystick in the launch aircraft could be translated into yaw and pitch as the missile spun. Flares attached to two of the midsection wings were used to keep the missile visible through the smoke of its motor.

The warhead consisted of a 20 kg (44 lb) fragmentation device that had a lethal radius of about 8 m (26 ft). It was thought that the guidance system would allow the pilot to get the missile into this range in terms of pitch and yaw. But with the ranges the missile could operate at, it would be almost impossible to judge range to the target bomber anywhere near this accuracy. For this reason the missile mounted a proximity fuze known as a Kranich (Crane), using an acoustical system tuned to the 200 Hz sound of the B-17's engines in cruise mode, activated by the Doppler shift as the missile approached. The trigger range was seven metres (23 ft).

The first flight test occurred on August 11, 1944, using a Focke-Wulf Fw 190 for the launch platform. Subsequent tests used the Junkers Ju 88 and Messerschmitt Me 262, although they were not launched from the latter. The X-4 had originally been intended for use by single-seat fighters (including the Me 262 and possibly the Dornier Do 335), but the problems in guiding both the missile and the aircraft at the same time proved unworkable. Instead, the X-4 was re-directed to multi-seat aircraft like the Ju 88, while the unguided R4M rocket was to be used in single-seaters.

The X-4 was designed to be easily assembled by unskilled labour and airframe production began in early 1945 incorporating low-cost (non-strategic) materials, such as wood for fins. Production was hampered by Allied bombing of the BMW rocket engine factory at Stargard, though as many as 1,000 X-4s may have been completed, the missile was never officially delivered to the Luftwaffe. The fighter-interceptor designed to use this missile as its primary weapon was the Focke-Wulf Ta 183 Huckebein, which never got out of the project stage.

After the war, French engineers tried to develop a domestic version of the X-4, the Nord SS.10. 200 units were manufactured between 1947 and 1950. However, the program was disbanded due to the dangerous pre-flight refueling involved (the hypergolic nitric acid and Tonka combination was highly explosive).

== Specification ==
- Primary function: short-range air-to-air missile
- Propulsion: BMW 109-448 liquid rocket motor giving 30–140 kg (66–309 lb) thrust for 17 seconds
- Length: 2 m (6.6 ft)
- Diameter: 22 cm (8.7 in) (maximum)
- Wingspan: 74 cm (29 in)
- Launch weight: 60 kg (130 lb)
- Speed: 880 km/h (550 mph)
- Warhead: 20 kg (44 lb) fragmentation
- Range: 1.5–3.5 km (0.93–2.17 mi; 0.81–1.89 nmi)
- Fuzes: Kranich acoustic proximity fuze
- Guidance system: FuG 510/238 "Düsseldorf/Detmold" MCLOS visual guidance with wire control
- Unit cost:
- Date deployed: never

== See also ==
- List of missiles
- List of World War II guided missiles of Germany
