= Israel-related conspiracy theories =

Israel-related conspiracy theories encompass a range of conspiracy theories about the State of Israel, its government, its military, its intelligence services, and its Jewish citizens, attributing to them malicious intent and exaggerated powers or technological development. They follow the pattern of other conspiracy theories, often while incorporating antisemitic tropes.

== Zoological ==
Zoological conspiracy theories involving Israel are occasionally found in the media or on the Internet, typically in Muslim-majority countries, alleging use of animals to attack civilians or conduct espionage. These conspiracies are often reported as evidence of a Zionist or Israeli plot.

Examples include the December 2010 shark attacks in Egypt, Hezbollah claims of capturing Israeli spying eagles, and the 2011 capture in Saudi Arabia of a griffon vulture carrying a GPS wildlife tracking device which was said to be part of a "Zionist plot", a claim dismissed by Israeli wildlife officials as ludicrous.

Writing in The Times, James Hider linked the responses to the shark incident with those to the vulture incident and ascribed the reactions in Arab countries to "paranoia among Israel's enemies and its nominal friends," adding that "evidence of Mossad using animals is scant."

Jackson Diehl of The Washington Post said that Arab media and officials who circulate fantasies of Mossad sharks and spy birds "deserve to be mocked." Diehl wrote that the paranoia in fact has also a more benign explanation, since Israel's real covert operations "are almost as fantastic as the fantasies."

In 2011, Jihad el Khazen of the Lebanese newspaper Dar Al Hayat published a column analyzing recent animal-related conspiracy theories, explaining that the concept of conspiracy is not particular to Arabs. According to Dar Al Hayat, people "always look for explanations that suit their prejudices or whims, even as such explanations often give truth, logic and reason a slap in the face."

Gil Yaron wrote in The Toronto Star that "Many animals undoubtedly serve in Israel's army and security services: dogs sniff out bombs and alpaca help mountaineers carry their loads. [...] But tales about the use of sharks, birds, rodents or, as has also been claimed, insects in the service of the military are more the fruit of imagination than hard fact."

=== Birds ===
Birds and other animals are often tagged with GPS tracking devices or identification bands to record their movements for animal migration tracking and similar reasons. The high-resolution tracks available from a GPS-enabled system can potentially allow for tighter control of animal-borne communicable diseases such as the H5N1 strain of avian influenza.

According to an avian ecologist for the Israel's Nature and Parks Authority, the idea that tagged birds are used for spying is absurd. "Birds and other wildlife belongs to all of us and we have to cooperate," he stated. "Ignorance causes these stupid beliefs that they are used for spying."

==== Kestrel ====
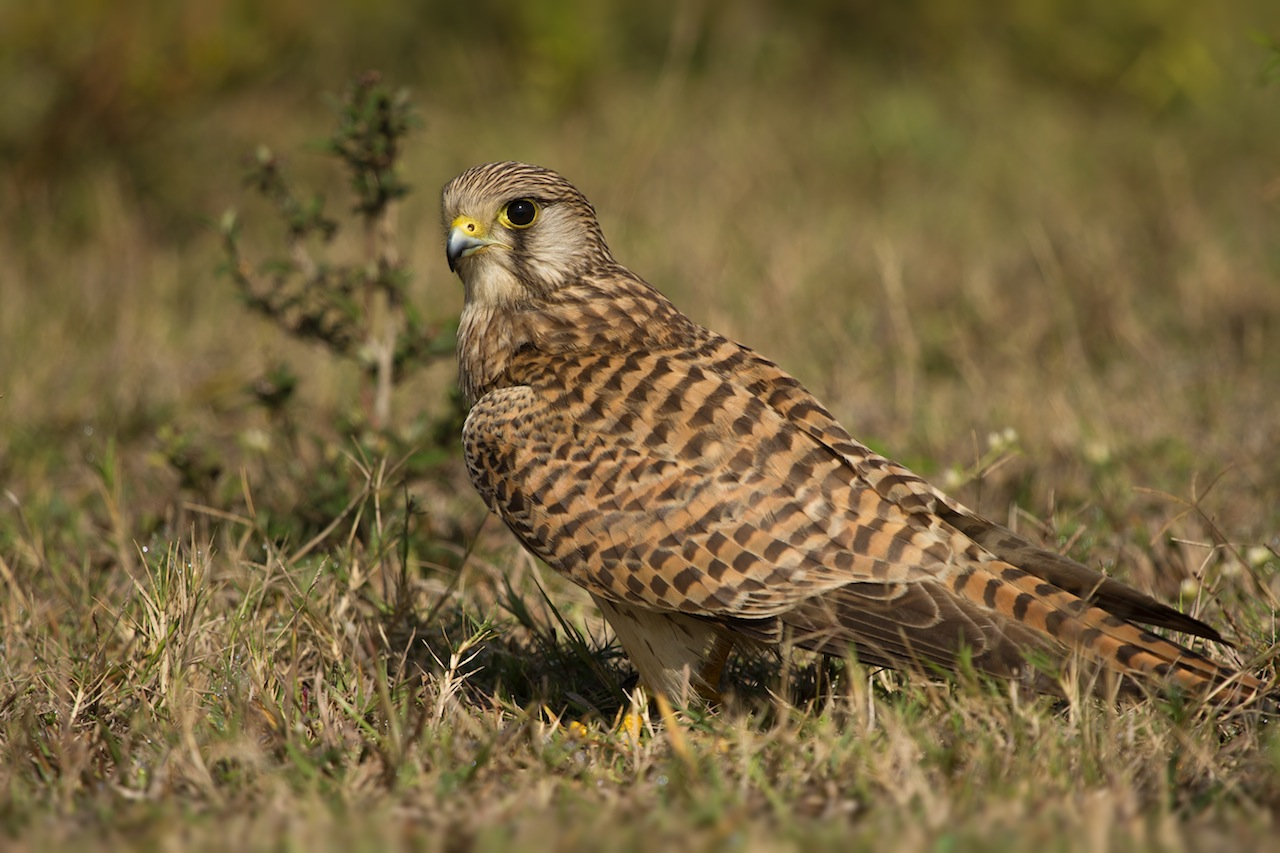
In 2013, a kestrel was subjected to medical examinations at Firat University in Turkey after being identified as an "Israeli spy".

In 2013, a kestrel carrying an Israeli foot band was discovered by villagers in the Elazığ Province, Turkey. Initially, medical personnel at Firat University identified the bird as an "Israeli Spy" in their registration documents, but X-ray scans and other tests found no electronic equipment. No charges were filed and the kestrel was freed and allowed to continue its flight.

==== Bee-eater ====
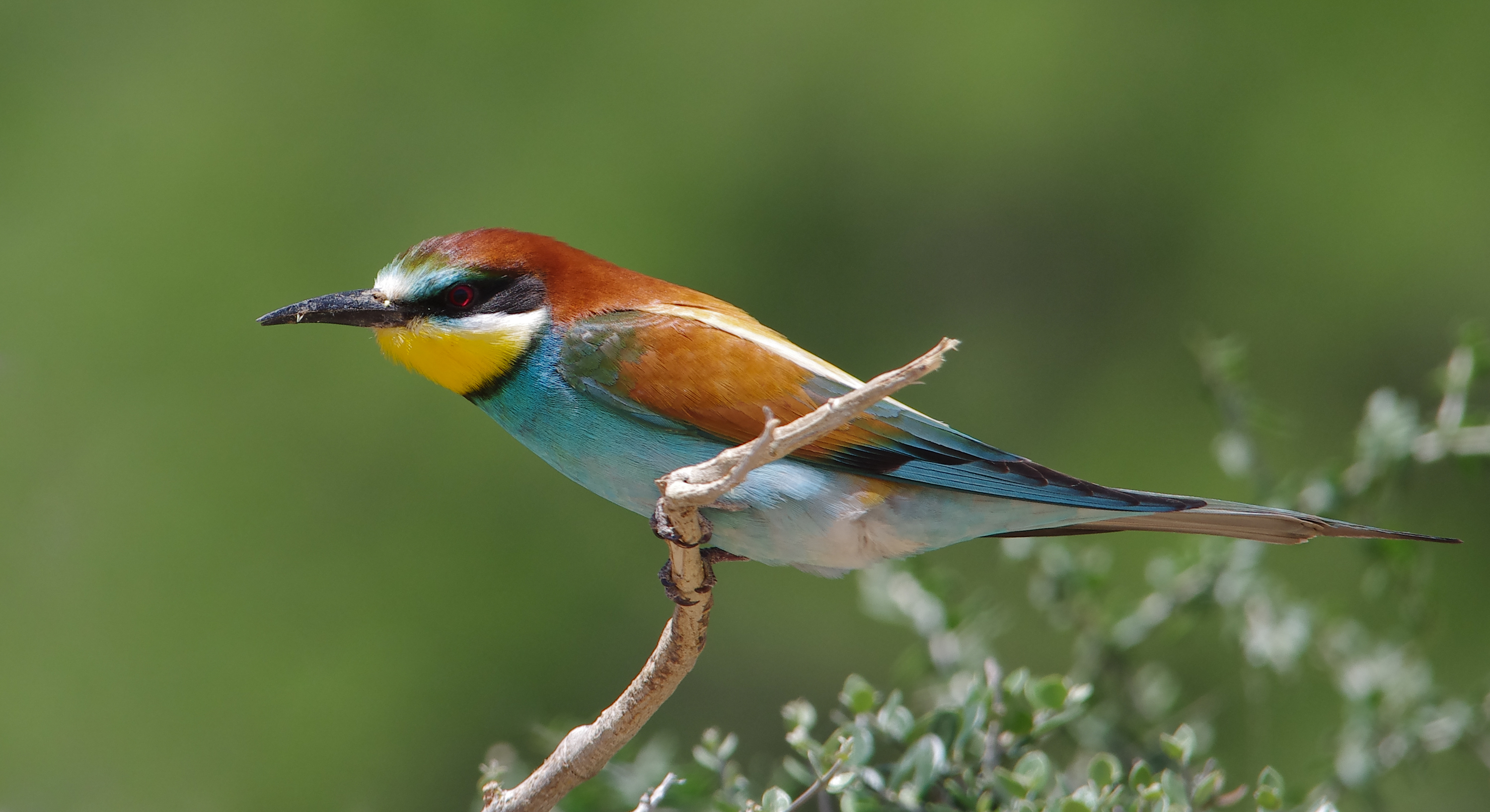
A European bee-eater.

In May 2012, a dead European bee-eater with an Israeli leg-band, used by naturalists to track migratory birds, was found near the southeastern Turkish city of Gaziantep. The villagers worried that the bird was carrying a micro-chip from Israeli intelligence and alerted local officials. The head of the Agriculture and Livestock Provincial Directorate in Gaziantep examined the corpse and stated that "the nose of the bird is very different and much lighter than others" and that it "can be used for audio and video," which, "in the case of Israel, they do." A counter-terrorism unit that was called in assured villagers that it was common to equip migratory birds with rings in order to track their movements.

BBC correspondent, Jonathan Head, described the incident as part of the "wildly implausible conspiracy theories" that take root in Turkey, with "alleged Israeli plots among the most widely believed."

==== Vultures ====
In December 2012, a Sudanese newspaper reported that the Sudan government had captured a vulture in the town of Kereinek, which they said was an Israeli spy bird and was tagged in Hebrew and equipped with electronic devices.

Ohad Hazofe, the avian ecologist, told Israeli news site Ynet: "This is a young vulture that was tagged, along with 100 others, in October. He has two wing bands and a German-made GPS chip." Hazofe denied that the device had any photographic capabilities. In an interview with CNN, he stated that "I'm not an intelligence expert, but what would be learned from putting a camera onto a vulture? You cannot control it. It's not a drone that you can send where you want. What would be the benefit of watching a vulture eat the insides of a dead camel?"

==== Eagles ====
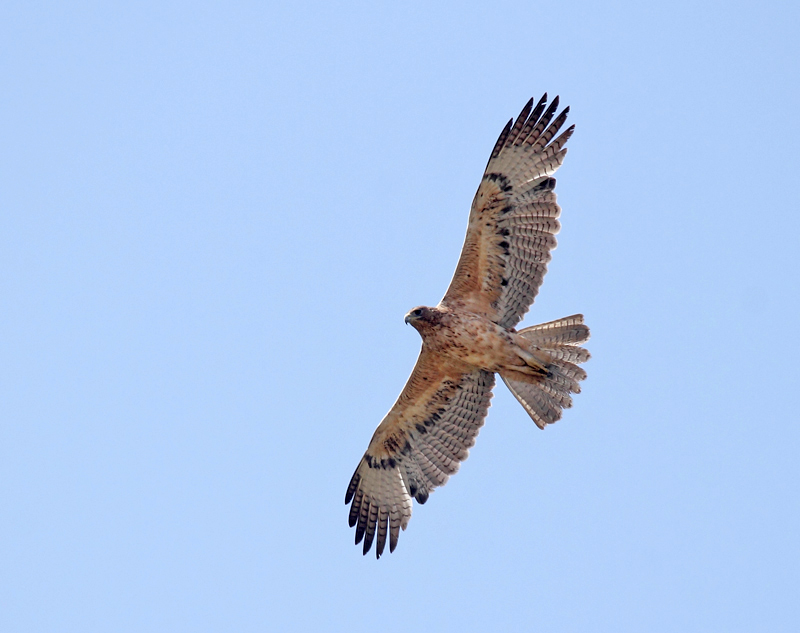
Bonelli's eagle, of the species that in 2013 was shot down in Lebanon with Hezbollah stating that it was an Israeli spy eagle.

In 2013, Hezbollah claimed that an Israeli spying eagle had been captured in Lebanon. They claimed that the eagle was one of many birds sent by Israel to spy and gather information via GPS transmitters across the Middle East. Tel Aviv University responded: "This morning, the media reported on an Israeli 'spy' that was caught by Hezbollah. The 'spy' is a predatory fowl that was part of a research project conducted by Tel Aviv University on raptors". The eagle that had been shot down, and delivered to Hezbollah, was a young and endangered Bonelli's eagle. Israeli ornithologist Yossi Leshem said he was tracking the bird for research and was "incredibly frustrated" it was killed.

A rare tagged eagle from the Golan Heights Gamla nature reserve that was captured by Syrian opposition forces and first suspected of carrying electronic espionage devices was then returned to Israel on 5 September 2017, as a gesture in recognition of the medical treatment Israel has provided to Syrians during the Syrian Civil War.

==== Griffon vultures ====
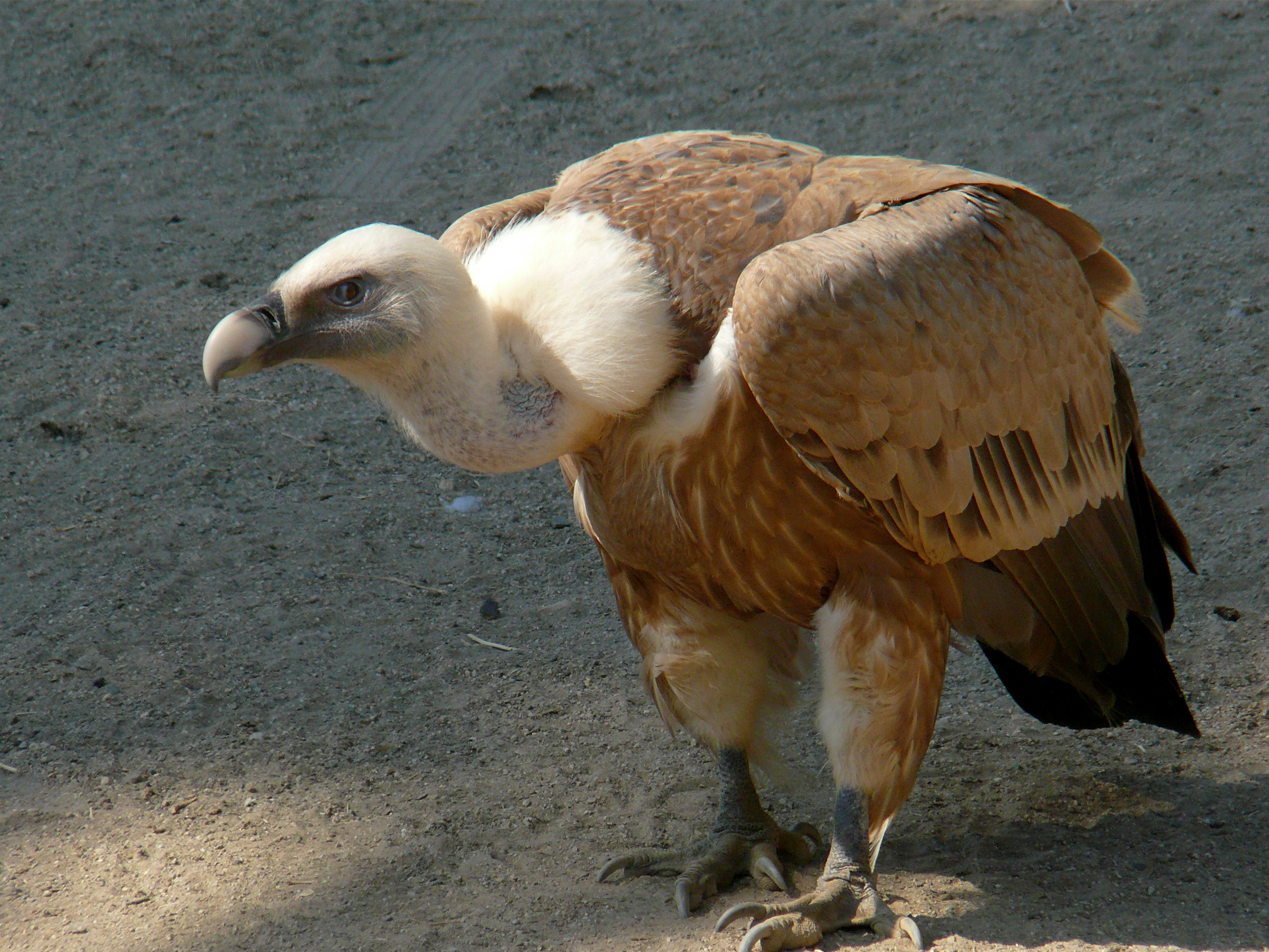
A griffon vulture similar to the ones captured in 2011 and 2016.

The griffon vulture has nearly disappeared from the mountains of Israel and is the subject of a reintroduction project. As part of that project, vultures are tagged with radios and labels to keep track of the population.

In 2011, a griffon vulture with a wingspan of about 8 feet (2.4 m) was caught by a hunter near Ha'il, Saudi Arabia wearing a GPS device and a "Tel Aviv University" leg tag. Rumors spread among locals, repeated in some Saudi newspapers, that the bird was sent by Israel to spy on the country.

Prince Bandar bin Sultan, then Secretary General of the Saudi National Security Council, dismissed the rumors, said the equipment on the bird was simply there for scientific study, and that the bird would be quickly released. Saudi wildlife authorities agreed that the equipment was for solely scientific purposes. "Some Saudi journalists rushed in carrying the news of this bird for the sake of getting a scoop without checking the information… they should have asked the competent authorities about the bird before publishing such news," Bandar said at the time. Israeli officials described the rumor as "ludicrous" and said they were "stunned."

A spokesman for Israel's Park and Nature Authority told the Israeli daily Ma'ariv that Israeli scientists use GPS devices to track migration routes. "The device does nothing more than receive and store basic data about the bird's whereabouts," he said. The Israeli ornithologist Yossi Leshem of Tel Aviv University said that this was the third such detention of a bird tracked by Israeli scientists in three decades. He reported that Sudanese authorities detained an Egyptian vulture in the late 1970s, and a white pelican in the early 1980s, both carrying Israeli equipment used for animal migration tracking.

In January 2016, a griffon vulture with an Israeli tag was captured by residents of the Lebanese village of Bint Jbeil on suspicion of espionage after flying four kilometers (2.5 miles) across the border. The bird was tied by rope and, according to Lebanese security officials, checked for listening devices. The bird was later repatriated to Israel by UN peacekeepers.

=== Fish ===
==== Sharks ====
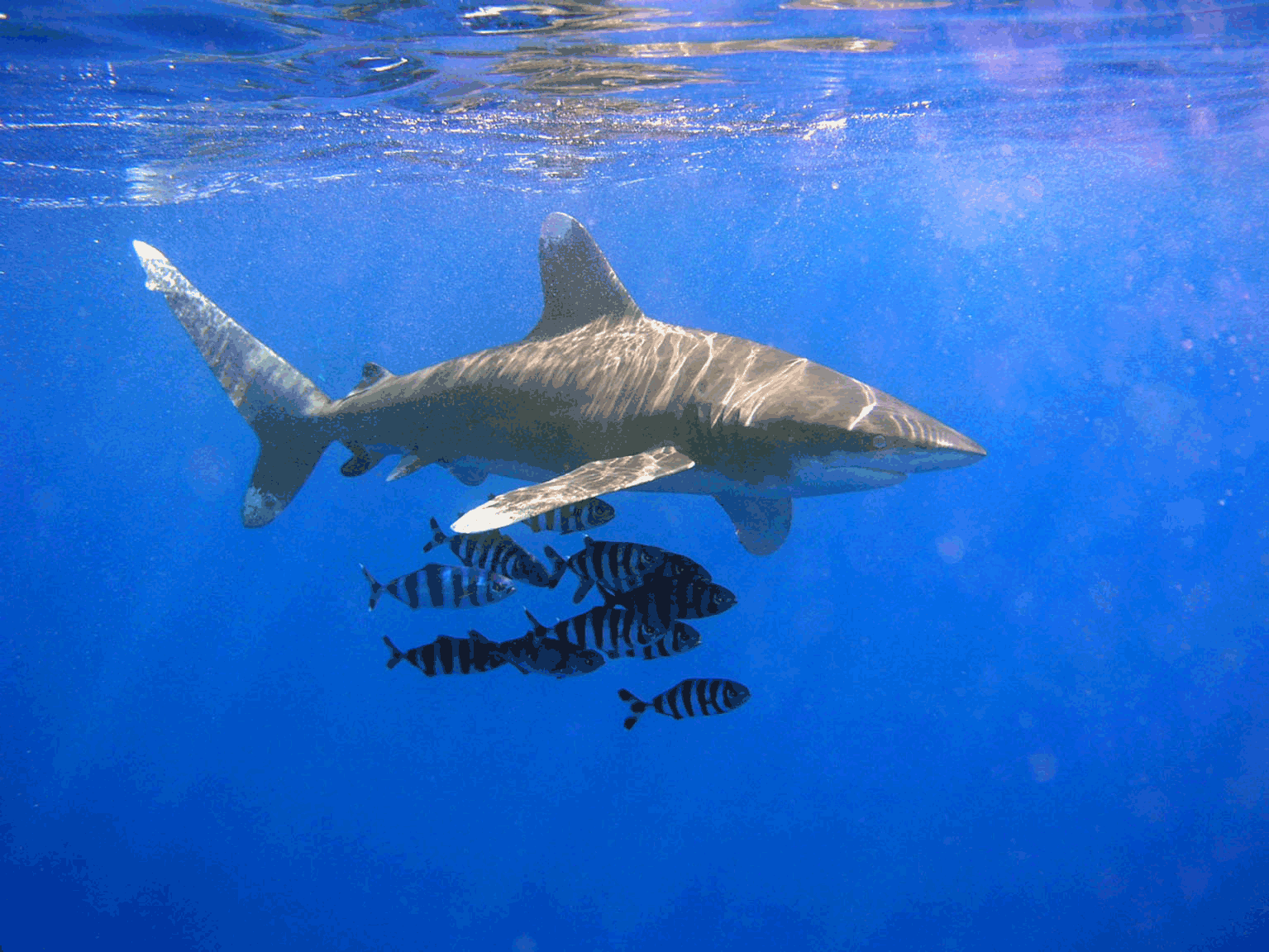
An oceanic whitetip shark, one of the two species implicated in the 2010 Sharm El Sheikh shark attacks

In December 2010, several shark attacks occurred off the South Sinai resort of Sharm el-Sheikh in Egypt.

Following the attacks, in an interview on Tawfik Okasha's popular but controversial Egypt Today television show, a Captain Mustafa Ismail, introduced as "a famous diver," alleged that the GPS tracking device found on one of the sharks was in fact a "guiding device" planted by Israeli agents. Prompted in a television interview for comments, the governor of South Sinai, Mohammad Abdul Fadhil Shousha, initially said: "What is being said about the Mossad throwing the deadly shark [in the sea] to hit tourism in Egypt is not out of the question. But it needs time to confirm." The Israeli foreign ministry, in response, suggested that Shousha had seen "Jaws one time too many." The governor later dismissed any connection between the event and Israel.

Describing the conspiracy connection to Israel as "sad," Professor Mahmoud Hanafy, a marine biologist at Suez Canal University, pointed out that GPS devices are used by marine biologists to track sharks, not to remote-control them. Egyptian officials suggested that the attacks were due to overfishing, illegal feeding, the dumping overboard of sheep carcasses, or unusually high water temperatures.

Amr Yossef, adjunct professor of political science at the American University in Cairo, wrote that this and other similar conspiracy theories result from a misconception among the Egyptian public that Israel is all-powerful. Yossef wrote, "Notwithstanding that such allegations have no factual or logical grounds, no one stops to ask why should an Israel facing serious security challenges (Iran, Hamas, Hezbollah, etc.) busy itself with that kind of stuff."

=== Mammals ===
Mammals have been used by the Israel Defense Forces since its inception in 1948. Pack animals such as mules and camels are used to negotiate rough terrain and haul equipment. The IDF conducts special operations training with llamas that are able to hide soldiers from heat-detection devices. Anti-tank dogs were used in Operation Blue and Brown, a 1988 attack on the headquarters of the Popular Front for the Liberation of Palestine – General Command in Lebanon. Antelope and oryxes have been introduced to Israeli army bases to clear vegetation while Barbary sheep are used to guard ammunition depots. Among the mammals that have been cited in Israel-related animal conspiracy theories are swine, hyenas, rodents, and a dolphin.

==== Dolphins ====
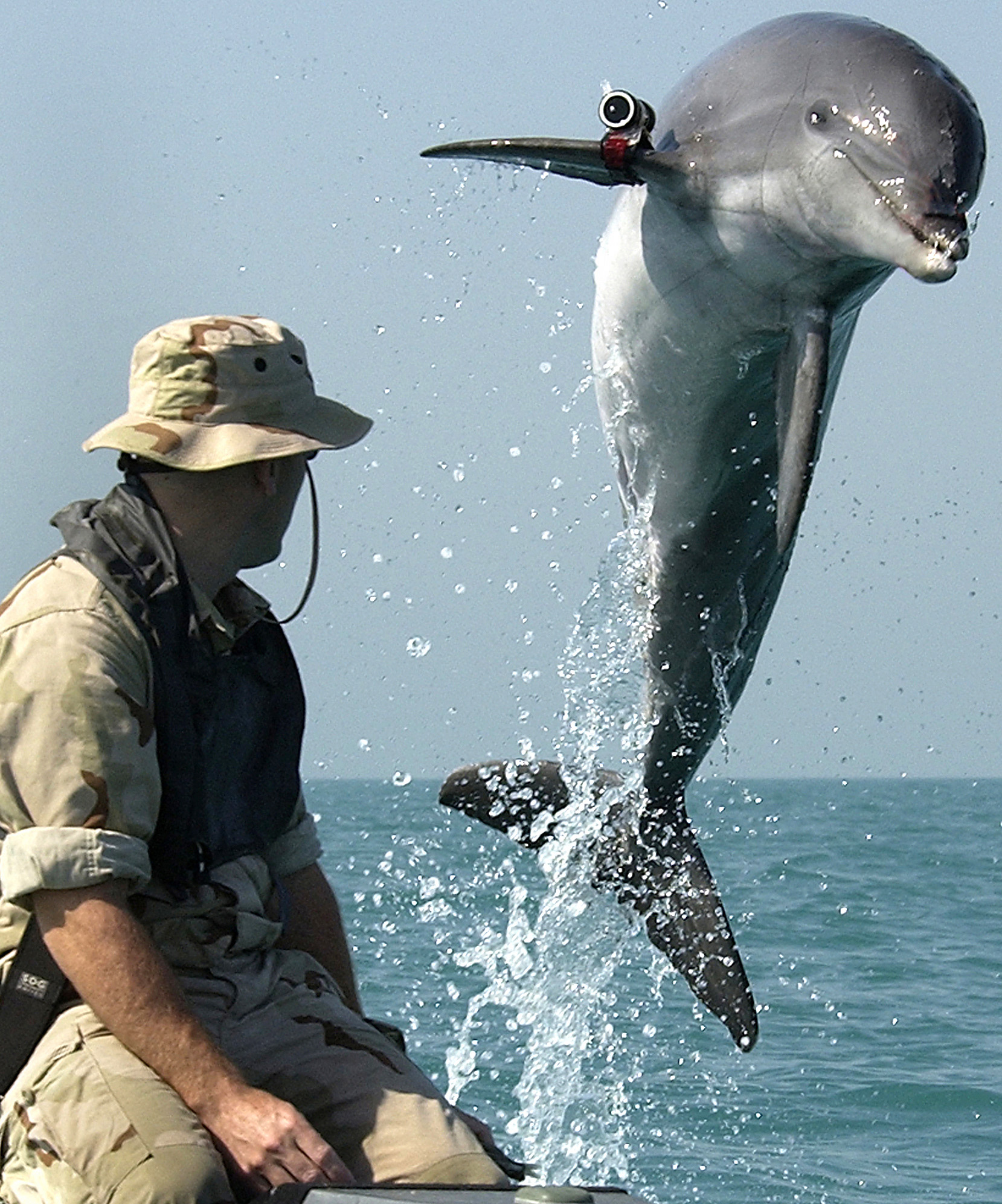
A dolphin named K-Dog used by the U.S. Navy for hunting mines

The first accusation that Israel employs dolphins for espionage was made on 19 August 2015 when the Izz ad-Din al-Qassam Brigades of Hamas claimed they captured one wearing cameras and other equipment off the Gaza coast.

Iran's Fars News Agency called it instead an "Israeli-made robot dolphin equipped with espionage equipment, including video-recording cameras."

"Israel did not just stop at the bloody attacks against the Gaza Strip," the Arabic-language Palestinian daily al-Quds reported. "Now it has recruited a watery pet, the dolphin, known for his friendship with humans, to use for operations to kill Qassam Brigade Naval Commandos." The Israel Defense Forces did not respond to the accusation, but Foreign Policy magazine noted that while "dolphins have been used by various militaries, including by both the United States and Russia, this report likely falls into what is a surprisingly fertile genre of conspiracy theories: the notion that Israeli intelligence routinely uses all manner of birds and other animals as tools of espionage." Nonetheless, in January 2022, a masked spokesman for the al-Qassam Brigades claimed in a video message that Israeli security forces had recently used another dolphin to chase Hamas frogmen off the coast of the Gaza Strip.

==== Rats ====
Allegations involving rats was on the news on 13 March 2018, when Jordanian TV host Dr. Bakr Al-Abadi told his viewers on Jordanian Prime TV:

"The Zionist entity gathered all the rats carrying the Bubonic plague in Norway, and released them in all the Egyptian provinces near the Sinai. According to several Egyptian sources, this operation took place in 1967, and these rats still exist in very large numbers. These rats breed very quickly and cause significant harm to crops. They devour these crops very quickly, and destroy grain silos. Even children are not safe from them. These rats often bite children's limbs. According to these sources, the Zionist entity, since the beginning of the normalization of its ties with Cairo, managed to smuggle chemical fertilizers and rotten seeds into Egypt, leading to the destruction of vast areas of soil and crops in Egypt. This is a well-planned strategic operation, with both short-term and long-term implications, but the clear goal is to annihilate the Arab world."

==== Cattle ====
On 27 December 2022, Al-Hayat Al-Jadida, the official newspaper of the Palestinian National Authority, reported that Rushd Morrar, a village elder of Khirbet Yanun near Nablus, claimed that Israeli cattle are "recruited and trained" spies. "These are recruited and trained cattle, as on the neck of each cow they hang a medallion with an eavesdropping and recording device on it, and sometimes cameras, in order to monitor every detail in Khirbet Yanun large and small," he said, and repeated the assertion that "settlers release herds of wild boars" to destroy Palestinian crops.

=== Reptiles ===
In February 2018, Hassan Firouzabadi, a military advisor to Iranian supreme leader Ali Khamenei, accused Western countries, including Israel, of spying on Iranian nuclear sites using lizards and chameleons, which according to him attract "atomic waves." "We found out that their skin attracts atomic waves and that they were nuclear spies who wanted to find out where inside the Islamic Republic of Iran we have uranium mines and where we are engaged in atomic activities," he said.

== Supernatural warfare ==
Some Israel-related animal conspiracy theories invoke superstition, conspiracy theories, folk religious beliefs, and antisemitic tropes in the context of modern warfare by referencing magical creatures.

For example, an interviewer in a 2014 broadcast on IRIB asked Iranian cleric Valiollah Naghipourfar if Israel was using jinn to collect military intelligence. Naghipourfar answered in the affirmative, "The Jew is very practiced in sorcery. Indeed most sorcerers are Jews."

In a March 2020 televised address, Supreme Leader of Iran Ali Khamenei claimed that Mossad was "using demons" and that "the Jews are experts at sorcery and at creating relationships with demons." He accused Israel and the United States of working with jinn to create the COVID-19 virus, and announced that he would not accept related international aid.

In 2021, Mohammad Bagheri, a novelist affiliated with the Islamic Revolutionary Guard Corps, wrote that Israeli intelligence operations use "magic, talismans, genie devils, and Kabbalah teachings."

In March 2023, Naghipourfar claimed that the intelligence services of Iran had repelled an attempted infiltration by Israel that had been "conducted via jinn."

Masaf Institute director Ali Akbar Raeefipour has claimed that "Mossad has formal 'supernatural units' which operate to wage psychic warfare and read minds," remarking that they employed those forces to win the 2006 war in Lebanon. Iranian cleric Mojtaba Azizi confirmed in 2024 that both the Central Intelligence Agency and Israel employ jinn in their missions, adding that Iran had the ability to use friendly jinn to combat them.

Iranian cleric Mostafa Karami told reporters in a televised interview that the Israel Defense Forces were able to kill Hassan Nasrallah and many other Hezbollah leaders in September 2024 by harnessing jinn. "[The Jews] have had access to genies and cosmic science since the time of David and Solomon. Historically, they have always used genies, their documents and traditions proved that. They have used genies and demons for warfare and intelligence operations throughout history."

In July 2025, Abdullah Ganji, a senior Iranian official and former editor of a newspaper linked to the Islamic Revolutionary Guard Corps, told 150,000 followers on X that after the Twelve-Day War, "a few sheets of paper were found on the streets of Tehran containing talismans with Jewish symbols." He added, "In the first year of the Gaza war, news had also leaked about [Benjamin] Netanyahu meeting with occult specialists. ... A few years ago, the Supreme Leader had stated that hostile countries and Western and Hebrew intelligence services use occult sciences and jinn entities for espionage." Ganji's claims were supported by Israeli entertainer and professed psychic Uri Geller. "The circumstances in Iran were so mysterious and so bizarre that the Iranian government realized that this cannot happen with mechanical means or cyberattacks," Geller told The Jerusalem Post. "They cannot happen with anything known to the human mind from a scientific point of view. They came to the conclusion that it was something supernatural, and they were basically right."

Former Iranian government spokesman Abdollah Ramezanzadeh has criticized the claims of the use of jinn by the Israeli military as distractions from legitimate security threats. Author Ali Bozorgian commented sardonically upon the discussion of jinn warfare, "The situation is strange. You wake up and realize the Jinns of Karaj have been defeated by the Jinns of Tel Aviv."

The official Farsi X account for Mossad responded to the 2025 allegations by Ganji by posting, "Using drugs and talking to the jinn are not desirable traits for someone leading a country."

== See also ==
- Animal-borne bomb attacks
- Animals used in espionage
- Conspiracy theories in the Arab world
- List of conspiracy theories
- Media coverage of the Arab–Israeli conflict
