= Licence to Kill (disambiguation) =

Licence to Kill is a 1989 James Bond film.

Licence to Kill or License to Kill may also refer to:

== Film and television ==
- License to Kill (1964 film) or Nick Carter va tout casser, a French action film
- License to Kill (1984 film), an American television film
- License to Kill (2013 film), a German documentary film about Israel
- "License to Kill", an episode of Dick Powell's Zane Grey Theatre
- "License to Kill", a two-part episode of The Fall Guy
- "License to Kill", an episode of Laramie
- License to Kill, a 2019 medical TV series hosted by Terry Dubrow

== Music ==
- Licence to Kill (soundtrack), a soundtrack album from the James Bond film, 1989
  - "Licence to Kill" (song), the movie theme song, performed by Gladys Knight
- License to Kill, an album, or its title song, by Malice, 1987
- "License to Kill", a song by Bob Dylan from Infidels, 1983

== Other uses ==
- 007: Licence to Kill, a 1989 video game based on the James Bond film
- Venom: License to Kill, a 1997 comic book miniseries

== See also ==
- Licensed to Kill (disambiguation)
