= Kuznechik (camel) =

Kuznechik (Russian: Кузнечик, meaning "grasshopper") was a Bactrian camel that became known for following the Soviet Red Army in its advance towards Germany in World War II.

== Camels in World War II ==
Sometime after the Battle of Stalingrad, many military units of the Soviet Red Army took to using camels in the southern theatre of the war in order to transport ammunition, fuel for tanks and aircraft, food, water for kitchens, fuel, and even wounded Red Army soldiers. The use of these animals as transport means was made necessary by the Kalmyk steppes' open terrain, their primitive roads and lack of water, as well as a shortage of adequate auxiliary vehicles in the Soviet armed forces.

In a notable case, a so-called "camel battalion" of around "one thousand camels" was carrying, for a "respectable distance," some "twelve thousand tons of various cargo," which would otherwise have required the use of approximately "134 trucks."

== From Stalingrad to Berlin ==
The 308th Rifle Division, formed on 21 March 1942 as part of the 1st Guards Army of the Soviet Red Army, started using a Bactrian camel brought over from Kazakhstan which the soldiers called kuznechik (Russian for "grasshopper"), for transport of food and cookery material. It is said that the camel also made it easier for soldiers returning to the camp to locate their unit from the "tall and imposing animal, visible at a great distance".

The 308th Rifle Division, in honor of its heroic performance, was renamed the 120th Guards Rifle Division and, as part of the 3rd Army of Rokossovsky’s Front, took active part in the Battle of Stalingrad under Colonel Leonty Gurtyev (where it defended the Barrikady factory), the liberation of Orel, Operation Bagration, the campaign for the recapture of Belarus, the East Prussian Offensive and finally the Battle of Berlin.

Kuznechik, carrying out its logistics duties in the rear, was to follow this mostly Siberian military formation all the way to Berlin, where its driver is said to have led the animal to the Reichstag to spit on the ruined building.

Other sources relate that Kuznechik was killed in a 1945 German air raid, near the Baltic Sea.

== Decorations ==
Kuznechik reportedly was awarded three wound stripes for injuries during various bombardments of the division as well as the Medal "For the Defence of Stalingrad".

== See also ==
- Animals in war
