= 2010 Sharm El Sheikh shark attacks =

Series of shark attacks in Egypt

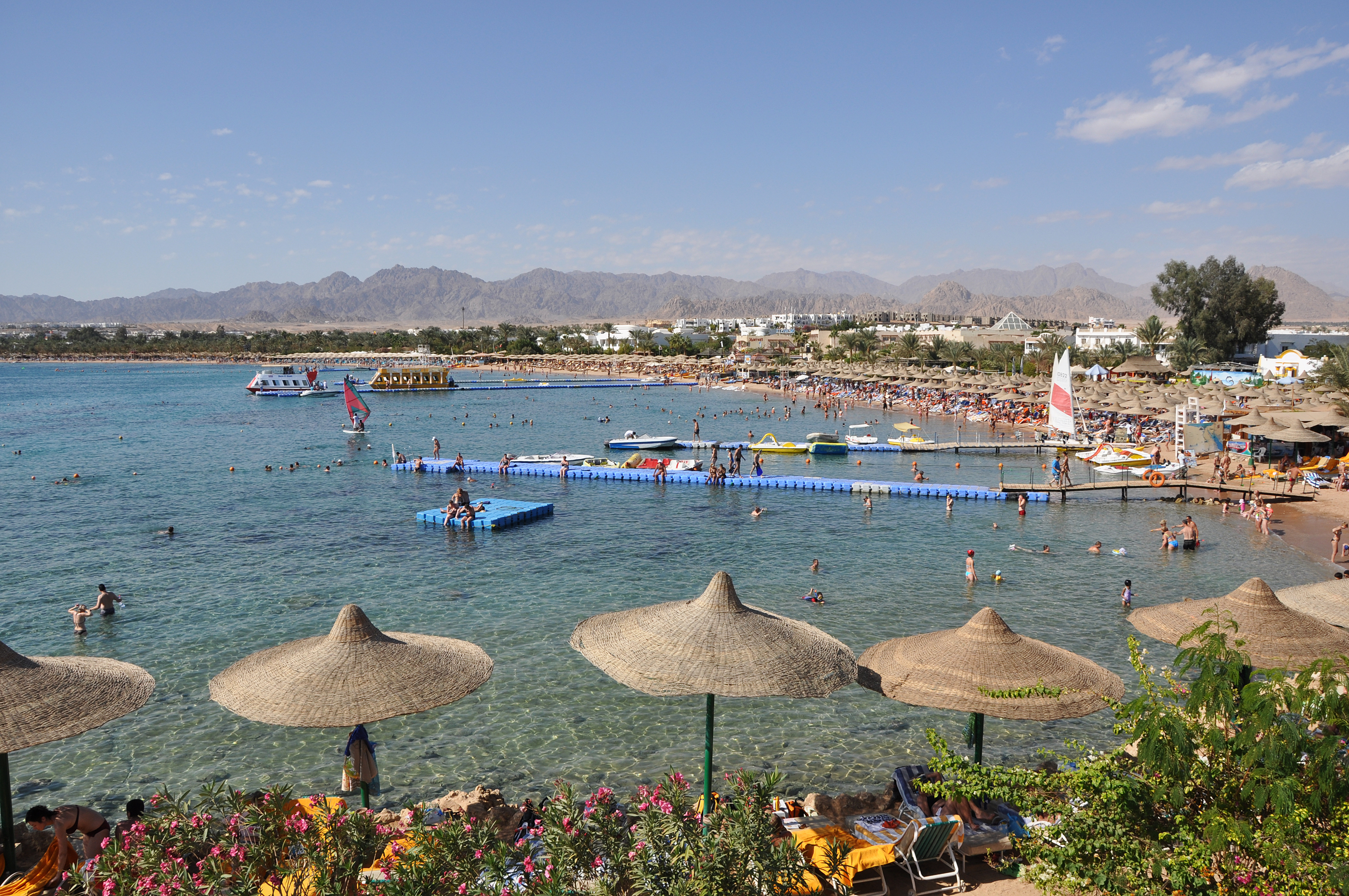
- Naama Bay in Sharm El Sheikh
- Date: 1–5 December 2010
- Venue: Naama Bay
- Location: Sharm El Sheikh, Egypt
- Type: Shark attack
- Deaths: 1
- Injuries: 5
- Suspects: 1 oceanic whitetip shark and 1 mako shark

The 2010 Sharm El Sheikh shark attacks were a series of shark attacks on swimmers in the Red Sea at a tourist resort in Sharm El Sheikh, Egypt. One Ukrainian and three Russians were seriously injured within minutes of each other on 1 December 2010, before a German woman was killed while wading and snorkeling in the shallows close to the shoreline on 5 December. The attacks were described as "unprecedented" by shark experts.

Beaches at the popular tourist resort were closed for over a week, dozens of suspected sharks were caught and killed, and the local government issued bans on shark feeding and restrictions on swimming. A variety of theories were proposed to explain the attacks, including overfishing in the Red Sea causing increased hunger and aggression in the sharks, as well as the illegal, intentional, or inadvertent feeding of fish close to shore which produces scents that attract sharks. Another theory considered that the dumping of sheep carcasses in the Red Sea by a livestock transport during the Islamic festival of Eid al-Adha may have attracted the sharks closer to shore.

== Attacks ==
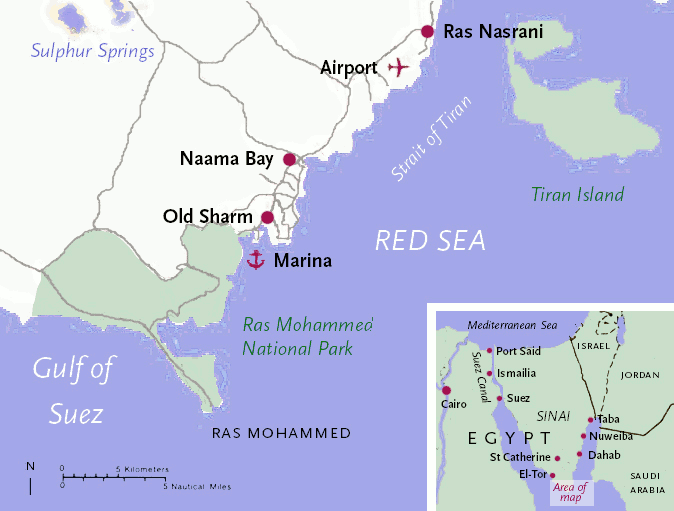
Map of Sharm El Sheikh; the attacks happened in Naama Bay and off Ra's Nasrani, a few kilometres to the north

The first attacks occurred on 1 December 2010, when four people were attacked within minutes of each other in the area of Ra's Nasrani. 48-year-old Russian woman Olga Martsinko suffered wounds to her hands and legs, lower back, and buttock, while 70-year-old Russian woman Lyudmila Stolyarova lost her right hand and left leg. Both had to have their injured limbs partly amputated. 54-year-old Russian man Yevgeniy Trishkin suffered serious leg wounds, requiring a partial amputation, and 46-year-old Ukrainian man Viktor Koliy suffered leg injuries but recovered enough to leave hospital the following day.

Stolyarova's husband Vladimir said, "I ran up to her and could hear her gasping, 'Shark! Shark! Shark!' She somehow managed to push the shark away from her. The shark bit off her arm, but she managed to swim closer to the shore. Before she got out of the water, the shark attacked again and bit off her foot." Other witnesses described the attack on Martynenko: "The woman managed to swim to the pier, but when people on the pier started pulling her out of the water, the shark bit off the woman's left buttock. She lost a lot of blood. There were tourists on the pier, and they helped to pull the woman out. Some of them were slapping the shark off with rubber fins. There were no rescuers on the pier during the moment when it all happened. A rescuer was running up to us from afar. There were neither cords nor stretchers at hand. We used a swimsuit to block the blood flow from the gaping wound and grabbed a sunbed to carry the woman to the shore."

The attacks on the two men were witnessed from the shore. A barman witnessed one of the victims "running from the sea with blood streaming from gashes in his leg". The other man had to be rescued by members of a local diving centre. According to the barman, "the sea went red ... [his foot] was gone".

In response, officials closed the beaches and suspended all diving and water sports. Specialists from the Egyptian Ministry of Environment were called in to investigate the incidents and caught a 2.25 metres (7.4 ft)-long oceanic whitetip shark weighing 150 kilograms (330 lb) that was claimed to be the one responsible for the attacks. The shark was identified by a local diver who claimed to have recognized it by its damaged fin. A mako shark that was 2.5 metres (8.2 ft) long and weighed 250 kilograms (550 lb) was also caught. However, divers and conservationists said the captured sharks were not the same as the one that had been seen and photographed in the area shortly before the attacks.

The attacks had a drastic effect on the local tourism industry. Bartender Mohamed Rashad was working at the al-Bahr beach restaurant during the attacks and said, "All the people ran away back to the hotel, no one wanted to stay on the beach. Now it's very quiet. People are scared to come to the beach. They are just coming to the bar to have a drink. They don't even want to stay on the sunbeds."

Egyptian authorities reopened the beaches on 4 December following the capture of the sharks. The following day, 71-year-old German woman Renata Seifert, who had visited the resort multiple times over the past 11 years, was killed by a mako shark while swimming in Naama Bay near the Hyatt hotel. Jochen Van Lysebettens of the Red Sea Diving College saw the attack and told Sky News, "Suddenly there was a scream of help and a lot of violence in the water. The lifeguard got her on the reef and he noticed she was severely wounded." According to local officials, she lost her arm in the attack and died within minutes.

Following the attacks, water sports were again suspended, though it was expected that scuba diving—which is considered to be at far less risk from shark attacks—would soon be allowed to resume. Egyptian authorities enlisted international shark experts to assess the situation and propose a solution. The Egyptian Ministry of Tourism also announced that the injured tourists would each be offered $50,000 in compensation, paid for by the local tourist industry. The attacks were widely described as "unprecedented" by both the media and American marine biologist Samuel H. Gruber.

== Possible causes ==
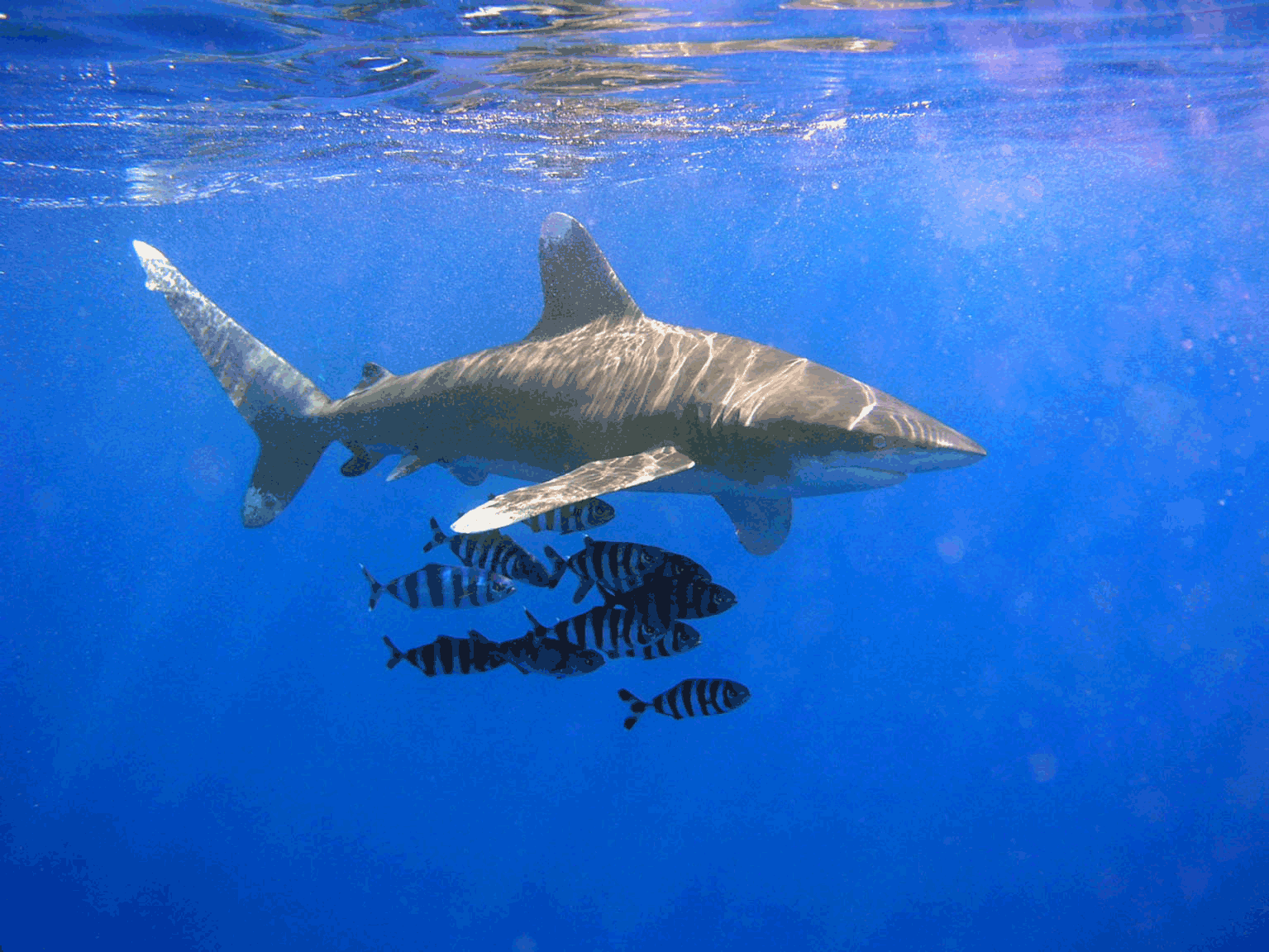
An oceanic whitetip shark, one of the two species implicated in the attacks

Sharks are commonly seen near Sharm El Sheikh but attacks on humans are very rare, particularly by the two species implicated in the attacks. Only nine attacks by oceanic whitetips had been reported worldwide in the last 430 years and only one had been fatal, though French oceanographic researcher Jacques Cousteau had once described the oceanic whitetip as "the most dangerous of all sharks".

Despite the greater notoriety of other sharks habitually found nearer the shore, the oceanic whitetip is believed to be responsible for many casualties as a result of predation on survivors of shipwrecks. Such incidents are not included in common shark attack indices for the 20th and 21st centuries; as a result, the oceanic whitetip does not have the highest number of recorded incidents, with only five recorded attacks as of 2009. The chairman of the Shark Trust, a British charity dedicated to shark conservation, commented: "It is probable that the tragic attacks were triggered by a specific activity or event... Attacks on humans by sharks are extremely rare and this species would normally not be found close to shore on bathing beaches". Mohammed Salam of the South Sinai Conservation organisation, a government body responsible for environmental protection in the area, said that "usually these kinds of sharks don't attack human beings but sometimes they have trouble with their nervous system and they accidentally go after people."

The chairman of the Sharm El Sheikh Chamber of Diving and Water Sports (CDWS) suggested that attacks might have been due to overfishing, which is an ongoing problem in the area. In a statement, Hesham Gabr said: "It is clear from our initial discussions with shark behavioural experts that this highly unusual spate of attacks by an oceanic whitetip shark was triggered by an activity, most probably illegal fishing or feeding in the area."

Other hypotheses for the shark attacks include that cattle ships transporting sheep for slaughter during the Islamic festival of Eid al-Adha on 16 November dumped sheep carcasses into the Red Sea, bringing sharks unusually close to the shoreline. Unscrupulous diving companies were also blamed for feeding sharks to attract them for their clients.

On 9 December 2010, an international team of experts announced that it had found that two species—makos and oceanic whitetips—had been involved in the attacks. It listed possible contributory factors as including "one or more incidents of illegal dumping of animal carcasses in nearby waters; depletion of natural prey in the area caused by overfishing; localised feeding of reef fish and/or sharks by swimmers, snorkellers and some divers; and unusually high water temperatures in Sharm El Sheikh."

== Israeli conspiracy theory ==
The attacks sparked conspiracy theories about possible Israeli involvement. Egyptian television broadcast claims from South Sinai governor Mohamed Abdul Fadil Shousha that Israeli divers captured a shark with a GPS unit planted on its back, allegedly by Mossad. Describing the theory as "sad", Professor Mahmoud Hanafy of the Suez Canal University pointed out that GPS devices are used by marine biologists to track sharks, not control them remotely. Shousha himself ultimately said he thought the dumping of sheep carcasses during the Islamic festival of Eid al-Adha on 16 November was the most likely explanation.

== See also ==
- Tourism in Egypt
