= License to Kill (2013 film) =

License to Kill (German: "Lizenz zum Töten: Wie Israel seine Feinde liquidiert") is a 2013 German documentary film about Israel directed by Egmont R. Koch. The documentary offers interviews with lawyers, politicians and former Mossad agents.

== Cast ==
- Arye Sharuz Shalicar
- Asa Kasher, former Mossad agent
- Moti Kfir, former Mossad agent
- Keshet Elion, former Mossad agent
- Gad Shimron, former Mossad agent
- Iftach Spector, general
- Philip Alston, professor
- Eliezer Tsafrir, former Mossad agent
