= Animal-borne bomb attacks =

Use of animals as delivery systems for explosives

Animal-borne bomb attacks are the use of animals as delivery systems for explosives. The explosives are strapped to a pack animal such as a horse, mule or donkey. The pack animal may be set off in a crowd.

Projects of bat bombs, dog bombs, and pigeon bombs have also been studied.

== Incidents ==
=== Afghanistan ===
In 2009, Taliban insurgents strapped an improvised explosive device to a donkey and let the donkey loose a short way from a camp of the British Armed Forces in Helmand Province.

In April 2013, in Kabul, a bomb attached to a donkey blew up in front of a police security post, killing a policeman and wounding three civilians. A government spokesman claimed insurgents were challenging the competence of the Afghan government prior to the 2014 withdrawal of the U.S. military.

=== Iraq ===
On 21 November 2003, eight rockets were fired from donkey carts at the Iraqi oil ministry and two hotels in downtown Baghdad, injuring one man and causing some damage.

In 2004, a donkey in Ramadi was loaded with explosives and set off towards a US-run checkpoint. It exploded before it was able to injure or kill anyone. The incident, along with a number of similar incidents involving dogs, fueled fears of terrorist practices of using living animals as weapons, a change from an older practice of using the bodies of dead animals to hold explosives. The use of improvised explosive devices concealed in animals' carcasses was also a common practice among the Iraqi Insurgency.

=== Lebanon ===
Malia Sufangi, a young Lebanese woman, was caught in the Security Zone in November 1985 with an explosive device mounted on a donkey with which she had failed to carry out an attack. She claimed that she had been recruited and dispatched by Syrian Brigadier-General Ghazi Kanaan who supplied the explosives and instructions on how the attack was to be carried out from his headquarters in the town of Anjer in the Bekaa Valley.

=== United States ===
In 1862, during the New Mexico campaign of the American Civil War a Confederate force approached the ford at Valverde, six miles north of Fort Craig, hoping to cut Union communications between the fort and their headquarters in Santa Fe. When it was nearly midnight, Union Captain James Graydon tried to blow up some rebel picket posts by sending mules loaded with barrels of fused gunpowder into the Confederate lines; however, the mules went back toward the Union camp and detonated there. Although the only casualties were two mules, the explosions stampeded a herd of Confederate beef cattle and horses into the Union's lines, so depriving the Confederate troops of some much-needed provisions and horses.

In the Wall Street bombing of 1920, an incident thought to be related to the 1919 United States anarchist bombings, anarchists used a bomb carried by horse-drawn cart.

=== Palestine (West Bank, Gaza Strip, and before the 1948 partition) ===
- 20 June 1939 – Irgun bombing of a vegetable market in Haifa, Palestine using a boobytrapped donkey killed 78 people.
- July 1939 – Another Irgun donkey bombing of a Haifa market, killed 21 and wounded 24.
- 25 June 1995 – At approximately 11 a.m., a Palestinian rode a booby-trapped donkey cart to an Israeli army base west of Khan Yunis in the Gaza Strip and detonated it. The Palestinian and the donkey were killed, but no soldiers were wounded. Hamas claimed responsibility for the attack.
- 17 June 2001 – A Palestinian man rode a bomb-laden donkey cart up to an Israeli position in the southern Gaza Strip and set off a small explosion. Israeli soldiers destroyed the cart, and no soldiers were wounded. The Palestinian man was captured by the soldiers.
- 26 January 2003 – Palestinian fighters strapped a bomb to a donkey and then exploded it remotely on the road between Jerusalem and Gush Etzion. No humans were injured in the attack. PETA director Ingrid Newkirk wrote to PLO Chairman Yasser Arafat asking him to keep animals out of the conflict. PETA was criticized for not objecting to killing of humans in the context.
- Later on 8 June 2009 – Palestinian gunmen approached the Karni crossing between the Gaza Strip and Israel with several trucks and at least five horses loaded with explosive devices and mines. The gunmen fired on IDF troops who observed them, and at least four gunmen were killed in the ensuing battle. A previously unknown organization called "the army of Allah's supporters" (Jund Ansar Allah) claimed responsibility for the foiled attack. The IDF estimated that the gunmen had planned to kidnap an Israeli soldier.
- 25 May 2010 – A small Syrian-backed militant group in the Gaza Strip blew up a donkey cart laden with explosives close to the border with Israel. According to a spokesman for the group, more than 200 kilograms of dynamite were heaped on the animal-drawn cart. The explosives were detonated several dozen meters from the border fence with Israel. The animal was killed in the blast but no human injuries or damage were reported.
- 19 July 2014 – Hamas militants attempted to attack Israeli troops in Gaza with a bomb-laden donkey. IDF forces operating in the Rafah area near the Gaza-Egypt border located the donkey suspiciously approaching their position shot the animal, causing the explosives to detonate. Israeli army spokesperson Major Arye Shalicar referred to the donkey as a "human shield" he said, "They used this donkey as a human shield, or an animal shield, if you like".

=== Renaissance ===
==== Rocket cats and birds ====
One method described by Helm has attracted attention for its illustration of what has been dubbed a 'rocket cat' – a feline with what appears to be a rocket on its back propelling it towards a castle or fortified town. The same illustration also shows what appears to be a rocket-propelled dove. The illustration appears in various forms in different manuscript versions of Helm's book, as well as in the 1625 printed edition. The images appear in a section titled "To set fire to a castle or city which you can't get at otherwise," in which Helm describes ways of using incendiary devices strapped to animals to set fortified places on fire. He writes:

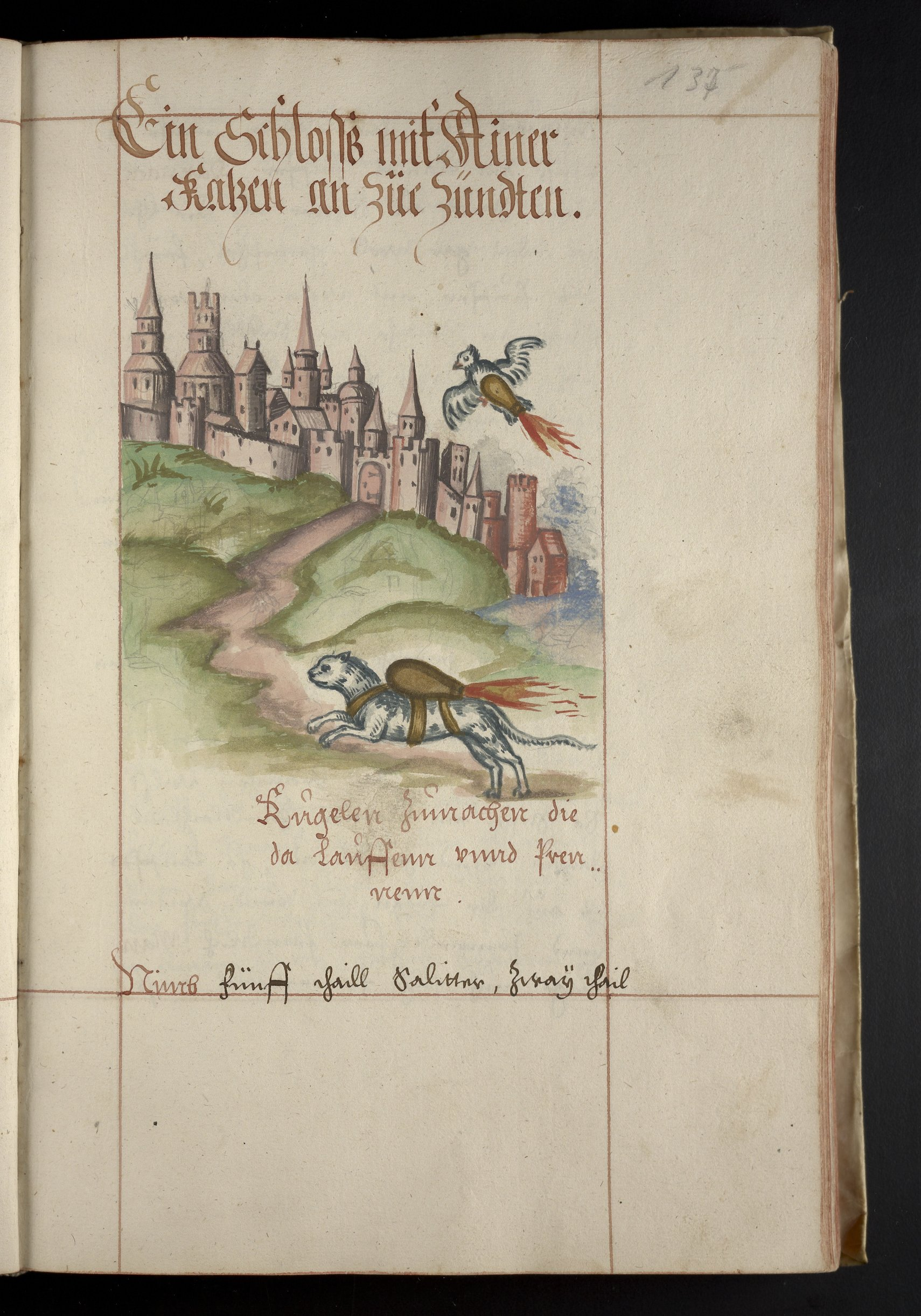
UPenn Ms. Codex 109, f137r.

== Military ==
During World War II the U.S. investigated the use of "bat bombs", or bats carrying small incendiary bombs. During the same war, Project Pigeon (later Project Orcon, for "organic control") was American behaviorist B. F. Skinner's attempt to develop a pigeon-guided missile. The project was barely funded and was cancelled on 8 October 1944. They had also used incendiary bat bombs that were largely ineffective. At the same time the Soviet Union developed the "anti-tank dog" for use against German tanks. The anti-tank dog project mostly failed, as the dogs would be spooked by the noises and gunfire, as well as running under Russian tanks due to the dogs being trained with diesel tanks, as opposed to the German tanks, which ran on petrol. The Imperial Japanese Army had used dogs and other animals strapped with bombs to run into American lines during Iwo Jima and Okinawa.

More recently, Iran purchased several dolphins, some of which were former Soviet military dolphins, along with other sea mammals and birds, in what some have alleged to be an attempt by Iran to develop kamikaze dolphins, intended to seek out and destroy submarines and enemy warships. However, the animals are today on display at the Kish Dolphin Park, on Iran's resort island of Kish in the Persian Gulf. During the Cold War, the Soviet Navy trained dolphins to attach underwater explosives and beacons to ships and submarines at Object 825 GTS at Balaklava, Crimea.

== See also ==
- Animals in war
- United States Navy Marine Mammal Program
