= War pig =

Pigs used in warfare

War pigs are pigs reported to have been used in ancient warfare as military animals. In combat, they were mostly employed as a countermeasure against war elephants.

Historical accounts of incendiary pigs or flaming pigs were recorded by the Greek military writer Polyaenus and by Aelianus Tacticus. Both writers reported that Macedonian king Antigonus II Gonatas' siege of Megara in 266 BC was broken when the Megarians doused some pigs with combustible pitch, crude oil or resin, set them alight, and drove them towards the massed Macedonian war elephants. The elephants bolted in terror from the flaming, squealing pigs, often killing great numbers of Macedonian soldiers by trampling them to death. According to an account, Gonatas later made his mahouts keep a swine among elephants to accustom the animals to pigs and this practice was immortalized by a Roman bronze coin dating back to his time, which showed an elephant on one side and a pig on the other.

== History ==
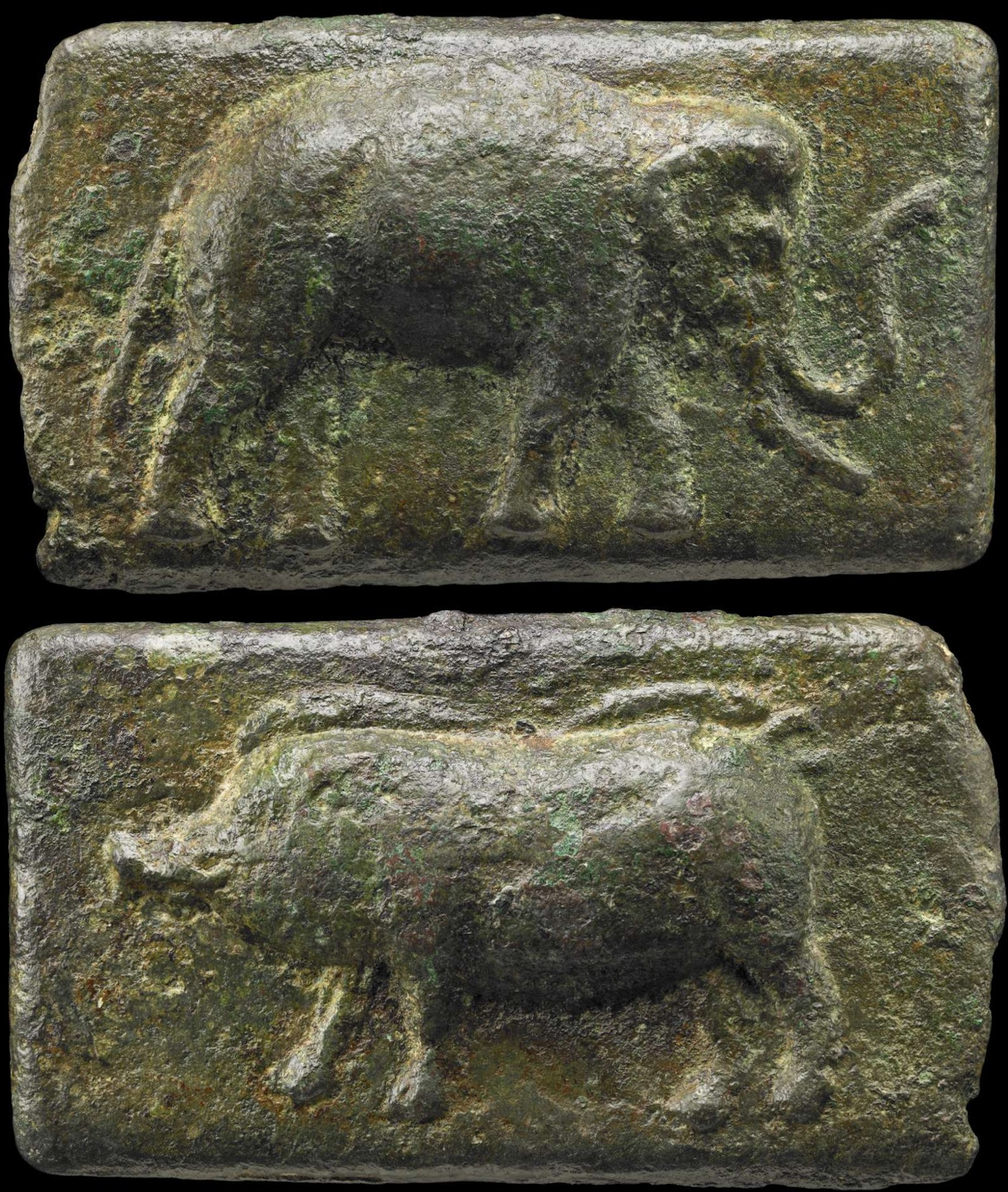
Cast bronze ingot minted by the Roman Republic after the Pyrrhic war, depicting an elephant and a sow.

In the 1st century BC, the Roman author Lucretius noted that humans may have attempted to launch wild beasts, such as lions or "savage boars", against the enemy, but with catastrophic results. In 272 BC, it was recorded that the Romans used wild boars in their fight against the war elephants of the Tarantines. According to a legend recounted in the "Alexander Romance", the Macedonian Emperor Alexander the Great learned about this "secret weapon" against war elephants from King Porus in India.

Roman author and military officer Pliny the Elder reported that "elephants are scared by the smallest squeal of the hog". Roman author and teacher Claudius Aelianus confirmed that elephants were frightened by squealing pigs and rams with horns, and reported that the Romans exploited both squealing pigs and horned rams to repel the war elephants of Pyrrhus in 275 BC. Byzantine Greek scholar Procopius, in History of the Wars, recorded that the defenders of Edessa suspended a squealing pig from the walls to frighten away Khosrau's single siege elephant in the 6th century AD.

As late as the 16th century, the supposed terror of the elephant for the squealing pig was reported by the English politician Reginald Scot.

== Bibliography ==
- Michael Crawford, Roman Republican Coinage, Cambridge University Press, 1974.
- Kistler, J. (2005, 2007). War Elephants. Lincoln: University of Nebraska Press.
- Mayor, A. (2005, 2009). Greek Fire, Poison Arrows, and Scorpion Bombs: Biological and Chemical Warfare in the Ancient World. NY: Overlook/Duckworth.
