= Licensed to Kill =

Licensed to Kill may refer to:

- Licensed to Kill (1965 film), a British imitation James Bond movie starring Tom Adams
- Licensed to Kill (1997 film), an American documentary by Arthur Dong
- Licensed to Kill? The Nuclear Regulatory Commission and the Shoreham Power Plant, a 1998 book by Joan Aron

== See also ==
- Licence to Kill (disambiguation)
