= Anti-tank dog =

Dogs trained to carry explosives by the USSR

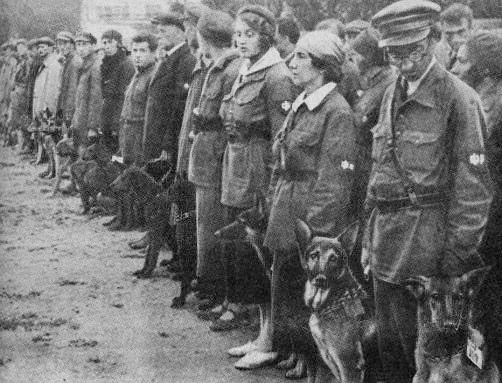
Soviet military dog training school, 1931

Anti-tank dogs (Russian: собаки-истребители танков sobaki-istrebiteli tankov or противотанковые собаки protivotankovye sobaki; German: Panzerabwehrhunde or Hundeminen, "dog-mines") were dogs taught to carry explosives to tanks, armored vehicles, and other military targets. They were intensively trained by Soviet military forces between 1930 and 1946, and used from 1941 to 1943 against German tanks in World War II. Initially, dogs were trained to leave a timer-detonated bomb and retreat, but this routine was eventually replaced by an impact-detonation procedure that killed the dog in the process.

== Background ==
In 1924, the Revolutionary Military Council of the Union of Soviet Socialist Republics approved the use of dogs for military purposes, which included a wide range of tasks such as rescue, delivery of first aid, communication, tracking mines and people, assisting in combat, transporting food, medicine and injured soldiers on sleds, and destruction of enemy targets. The idea of using dogs as mobile mines was developed in the 1930s, together with the dog-fitting mine design. A specialized dog training school was founded in the Moscow Oblast. Twelve regional schools were opened soon after, three of which trained anti-tank dogs.

== Training ==
The Red Army had no dedicated dog trainers in the 1930s, so they resorted to using hunters, police, and circus trainers. Several leading animal scientists were also involved in order to help organize a wide-scale training program. German Shepherds were favored for the program for their physical abilities and ease of training, but other breeds were used as well. In 1935, anti-tank dog units were officially included in the Red Army.

The original idea was for a dog to carry a bomb strapped to its body, and reach a specific static target. The dog would then release the bomb by pulling with its teeth a self-releasing belt and return to the operator. The bomb could then be detonated either by a timer or remote control, though the latter was too rare and expensive at the time to be used. A group of dogs practiced this for six months, but the reports show that no dogs could master the task. They performed generally well on a single target but became confused after the target or location was changed and often returned to the operator with the bomb unreleased, which in a live situation would have killed both the dog and the operator.

Continual failures brought about a simplification. The bomb was fastened to the dog and detonated upon contact with the target, killing the dog. Whereas in the first program, the dog was trained to locate a specific target, this task was simplified to find any enemy tank. Dogs were trained by being kept hungry and their food was placed under tanks. The tanks were at first left standing still, then were set with engines running combined with sporadic blank-shot gunfire and other battle-related distractions. This routine aimed to teach the dogs to run under the tanks in battlefield situations.

Each dog was fitted with a 10–12-kilogram (22–26 lb) mine carried in two canvas pouches adjusted individually to each dog. The mine had a safety pin which was removed right before the deployment; each mine carried no markings and was not supposed to be disarmed. A wooden lever extended out of a pouch to about 20 centimetres (7.9 in) in height. When the dog dived under the tank, the lever struck the bottom of the tank and detonated the charge. Because the underparts of the chassis were the most vulnerable area of these vehicles, it was hoped the explosion would disable the vehicle.

== Deployment by the Soviet Union ==
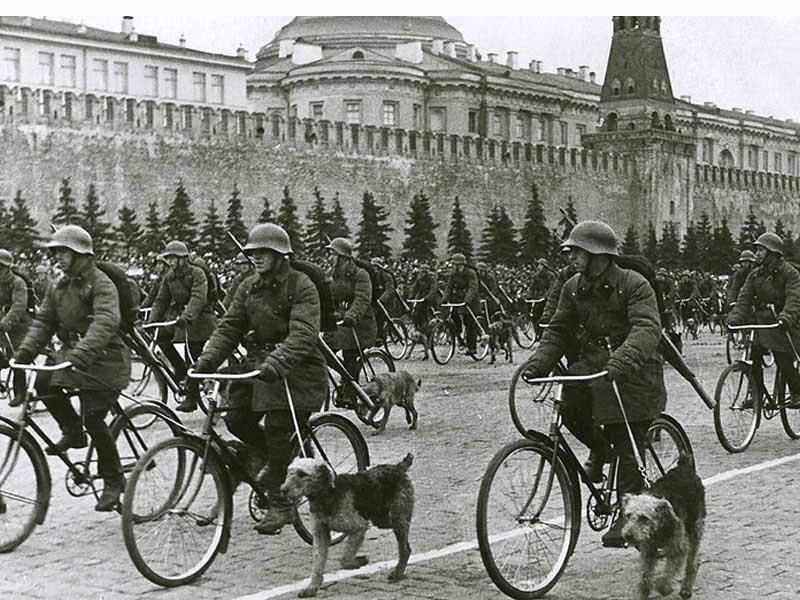
Military parade on Red Square, Moscow, 1 May 1938

The use of anti-tank dogs escalated during 1941 and 1942, when the Red Army made great efforts to stop the German advance on the Eastern Front of World War II. In that period, dog training schools were mostly focused on producing anti-tank dogs. About 40,000 dogs were deployed for various tasks in the Red Army.

The first group of anti-tank dogs arrived at the frontline at the end of the summer of 1941 and included 30 dogs and 40 trainers. Their deployment revealed some serious problems. In order to save fuel and ammunition, dogs had been trained on tanks which stood still and did not fire their guns. In the field, the dogs refused to dive under moving tanks. Some persistent dogs ran near the tanks, waiting for them to stop, but were shot in the process. Gunfire from the tanks scared away many of the dogs, which would run back to the trenches and often detonate the charge upon jumping in, killing Soviet soldiers. To prevent this, the returning dogs had to be shot, often by their controllers, which made the trainers unwilling to work with new dogs. Some went so far as to say that the army did not stop with sacrificing people to the war and went on to slaughter dogs too; those who openly criticized the program were persecuted by "special departments" (military counterintelligence). Out of the first group of 30 dogs, only four managed to detonate their bombs near the German tanks, inflicting an unknown amount of damage. Six exploded upon returning to the Soviet trenches, killing and injuring soldiers. Three dogs were shot by German troops and taken away without attempts by the Soviets to prevent this, which provided examples of the detonation mechanism to the Germans. A captured German officer later reported that they learned of the anti-tank dog design from the dead animals, and considered the program desperate and inefficient. A German propaganda campaign sought to discredit the Red Army, saying that Soviet soldiers refused to fight and sent dogs instead.

Another serious training mistake was revealed later; the Soviets had used their own diesel engine tanks to train the dogs rather than German tanks which had gasoline engines. As the dogs relied on their acute sense of smell, they wound up seeking out familiar Soviet tanks instead of the strange-smelling German tanks.

The efficacy of using anti-tank dogs in World War II remains uncertain. There are claims by the Soviet sources that around 300 German tanks were damaged by Soviet anti-tank dogs. This claim was considered propaganda by many Russian historians who believed it was meant to justify the dog training program. There are, however, documented claims of individual successes of the program, with the number of damaged tanks in such events being usually about a dozen. For example, at the front of the 160th Infantry Division near Hlukhiv, six dogs damaged five German tanks. Near the airport of Stalingrad, anti-tank dogs destroyed 13 tanks. At the Battle of Kursk, 16 dogs disabled 12 German tanks that had broken through the Soviet lines of defence near Tamarovka, Bykovo.

The German forces knew about the Soviet dogs from 1941 onwards, and so took measures to defend against them. Armored vehicles' top-mounted machine guns proved ineffective due to the relatively small size of the attackers, as the dogs were too low to the ground and because of the dogs' speed and the difficulty in spotting them. Consequently, every German soldier received orders to shoot any dog in combat areas.

After 1942, the use of anti-tank dogs by the Red Army rapidly declined, and training schools were redirected to producing the more needed mine-seeking and delivery dogs. However, training of anti-tank dogs continued after World War II, until June 1996.

== Use by other countries ==
The Imperial Japanese Army received about 25,000 dogs from their ally Germany and organized several dog training schools in Japan and one in Nanjing, China. In 1943, U.S. forces considered using armed dogs against fortifications. The aim was for a dog to run into a bunker carrying a bomb, which would then be detonated by a timer. Dogs in this secret program were trained at Fort Belvoir. The dogs, called "demolition wolves", were taught to run to a bunker, enter it, and sit while waiting for a simulated explosion. Each dog carried a bomb strapped to its body in canvas pouches, as with the Russian method. The program was terminated on 17 December 1943 due to safety concerns. During the training, dogs often returned to the senders without entering the bunker or waiting there for insufficient periods of time, which would have caused friendly casualties in a live fire situation. It was feared that in an actual battle, dogs would return much more often, scared by enemy fire. Attempts to continue the program in 1944 and 1945 failed.

In 2005, insurgents attempted to use a bomb-equipped dog during the Iraq War. The dog was detonated without inflicting damage.

== See also ==
- Anti-tank warfare
- Animal-borne bomb attacks
- Dogs in warfare
- Exploding animal
- Military animals as living bombs
