= Military animal =

Trained animal used for warfare or other military applications

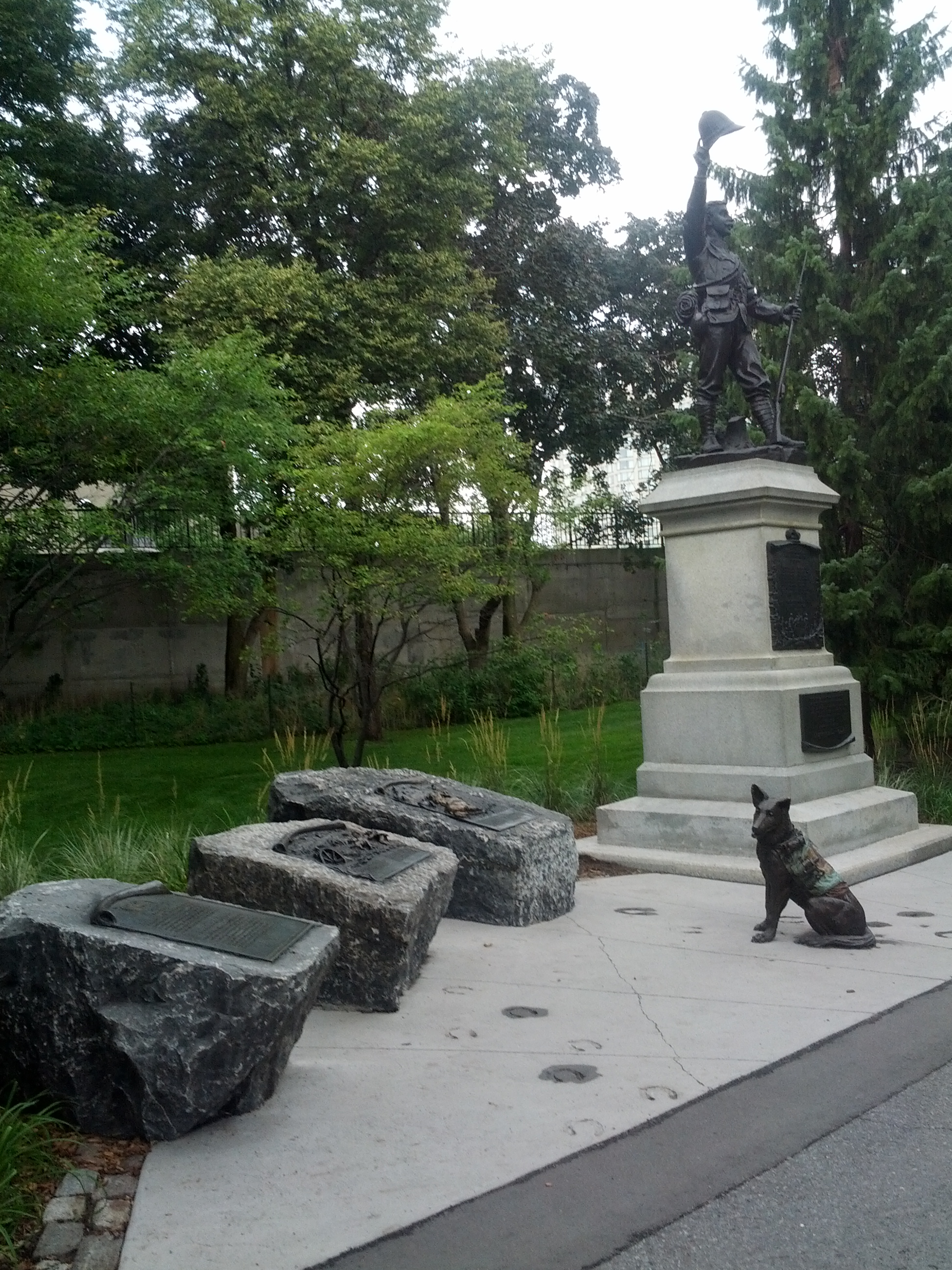
Monuments for military animals in Ottawa, Ontario.

Military animals are trained animals that are used in warfare and other combat related activities. As working animals, different military animals serve different functions. Horses, elephants, camels, and other animals have been used for both transportation and mounted attack. Pigeons were used for communication and photographic espionage. Many other animals have been reportedly used in various specialized military functions, including rats and pigs. Dogs have long been employed in a wide variety of military purposes, more recently focusing on guarding and bomb detection, and along with dolphins and sea lions are in active use today.

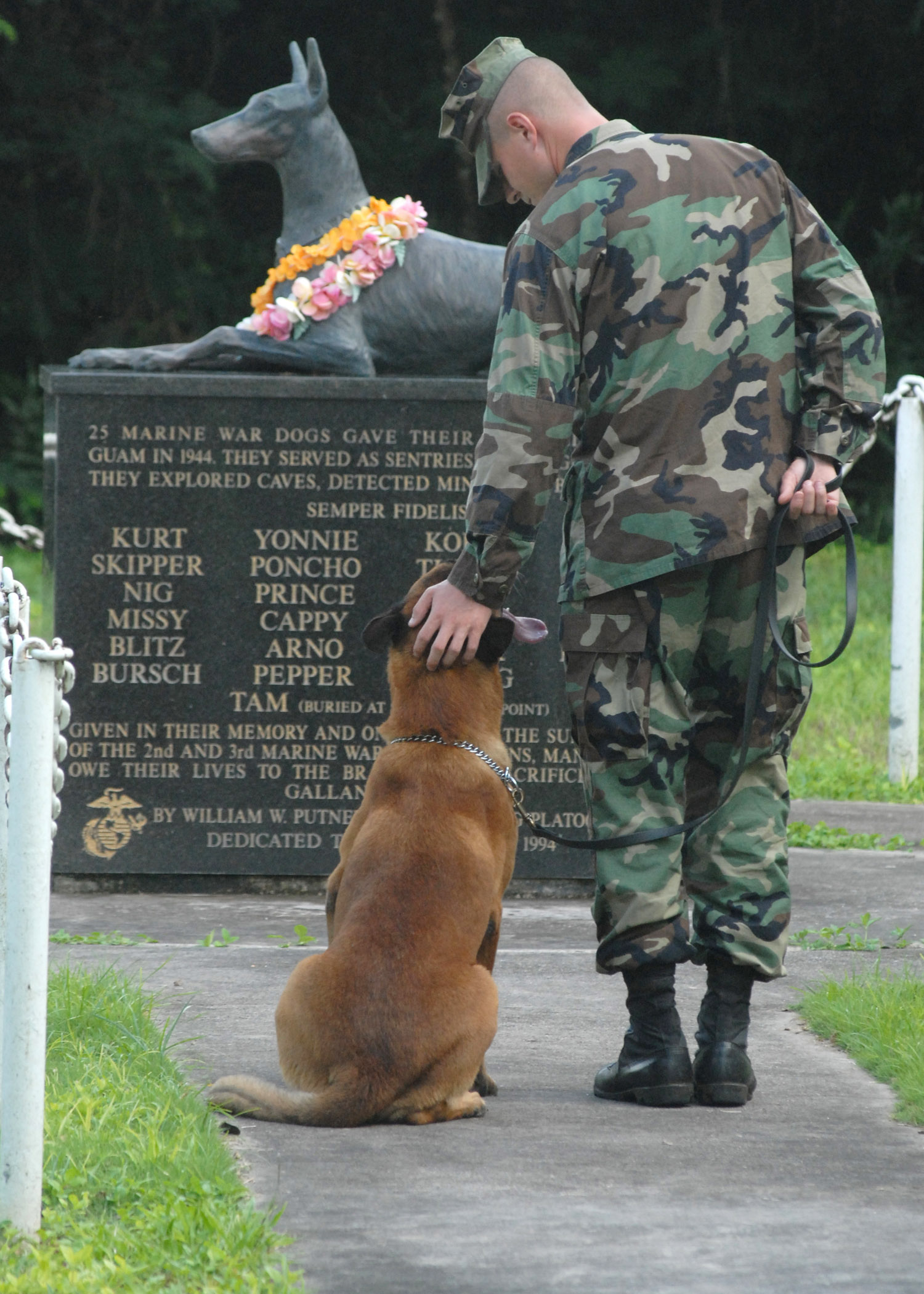
A U.S. Navy dog handler at the War Dog Memorial in the National War Dog Cemetery at Naval Base Guam. The cemetery honors the dogs—mostly Doberman Pinschers—that were killed in service with the United States Marine Corps during the Second Battle of Guam in 1944.

== Use ==
=== For transportation and hauling ===
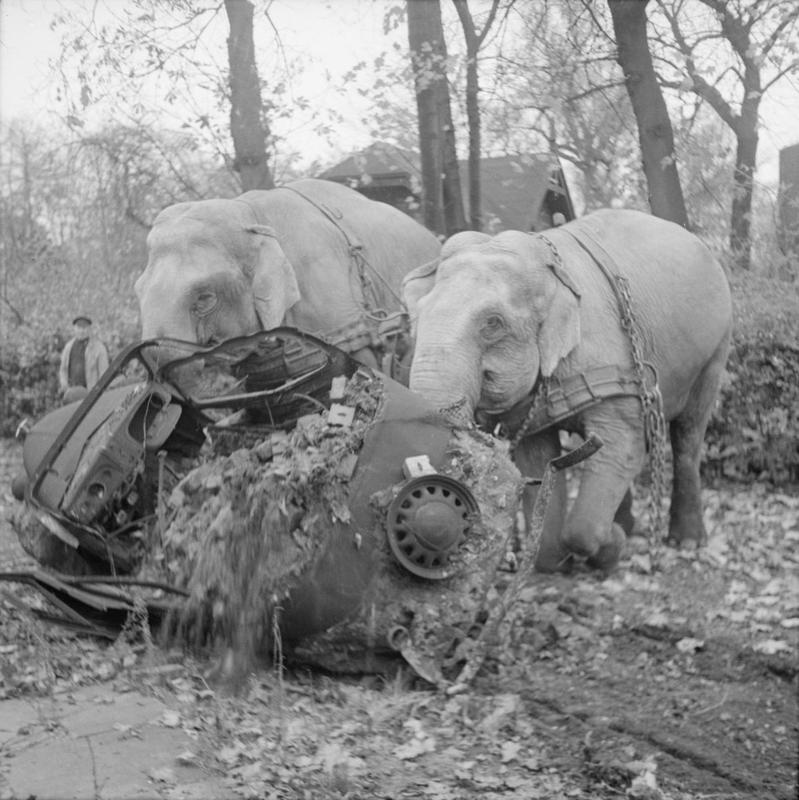
Circus elephants clear bomb damage, Hamburg, Germany, November 1945.

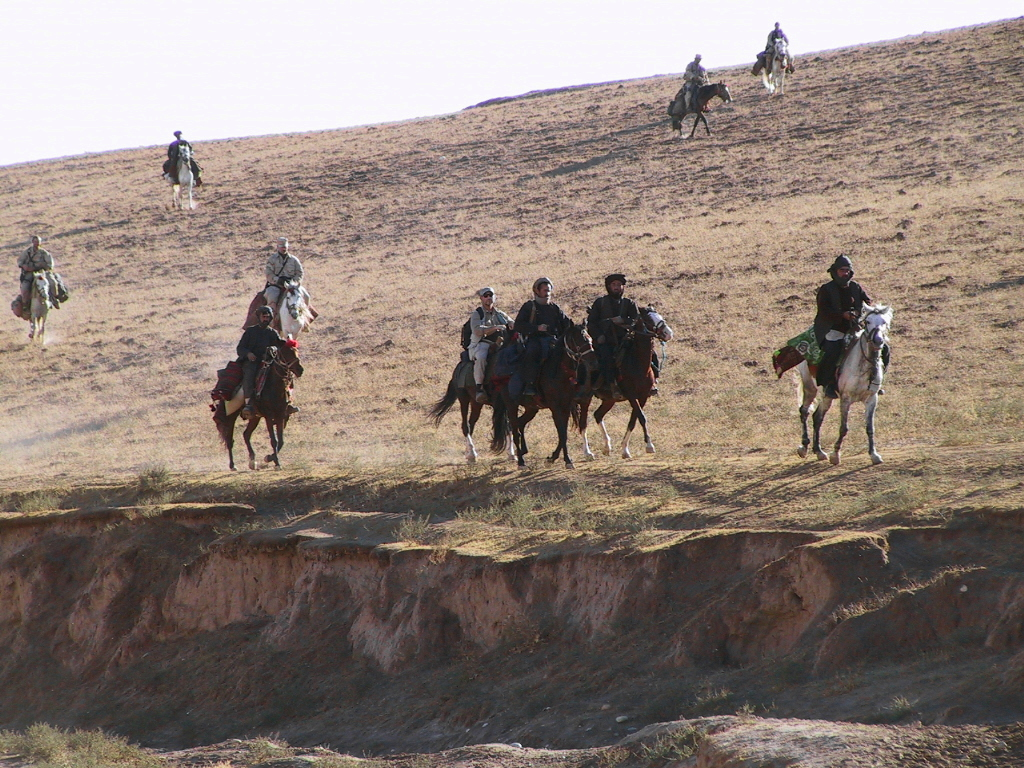
Photo released on 12 November 2001, claiming to show "the first US cavalry charge of the 21st century" in league with Northern Alliance forces in the Battle of Mazar-i-Sharif.

- The horse was the most widely used animal throughout the recorded history of warfare. Early mounts could pull a chariot or carry lightly armored skirmishing forces. With the appearance of heavier mounts and the invention of the stirrup, the horse-mounted cavalry became the most prestigious combat arm in Europe for several centuries. A knight's warhorse was trained to bite and kick. The combination of the horse-mounted warrior armed with a bow made the steppe people's armies the most powerful military force in Asian history. Horse-drawn war wagons were used by the Hussites during the Hussite Wars. With the appearance of modern ranged weapons and motor vehicles, horse use for military purposes fell into decline. However, horses and mules are still used extensively by various armies today for transport in difficult terrain.
- While elephants are not considered domesticable, they can be trained to serve as mounts, or for moving heavy loads. Sanskrit hymns record their use for military purposes as early as 1,100 B.C. A group of elephants was employed by Hannibal during the Second Punic War. They were employed as recently as World War II by both the Japanese and Allies. Elephants could perform the work of machines in locations where vehicles could not penetrate, so they found use in the Burma Campaign.
- Camels have typically seen use as mounts in arid regions (camel cavalry). They are better able to traverse sandy deserts than horses, and require far less water. Camels were employed in both world wars. Camels are used by the Indian Army and Border Security Force for patrolling in the desert regions of Rajasthan.

In World War II, many military units of the Soviet Red Army, sometime after the Battle of Stalingrad, took to using camels in the southern theatre of the war in order to transport ammunition, fuel for tanks and aircraft, food, water for kitchens, fuel, and even wounded Red Army soldiers. The use of these animals as means of transport was made necessary by the Kalmyk steppes' open terrain, its primitive roads and lack of water, as well as a shortage of adequate auxiliary vehicles in the Soviet armed forces. A case that became famous was that of the Bactrian camel named Kuznechik ("grasshopper") that followed the Soviet Red Army in practically all its advance towards Germany.

- Mules were used by the U.S. Army, the British Army, and the British Indian Army during World War II to carry supplies and equipment over difficult terrain. Pack animals that are innately patient, cautious, and hardy, mules could carry heavy loads of supplies where Jeeps and even pack horses could not travel. Mules were used in North Africa, Burma, and in Italy. They are also used for transporting supplies in mountainous regions.

It was necessary to have fifteen (15) mules attached to the (Tank) battalion for the purpose of transporting ammunition and gasoline to tanks which were impossible to service with any type of vehicle this battalion possesses. However, this is far from a satisfactory arrangement due to the limited amount of mules and the amount of supplies needed in the positions

— After action report, 751st Tank Battalion., February 1945, Section IV - Supply (page 190 of 242)
- Wojtek (bear) From Egypt, the Polish II Corps was reassigned to fight alongside the British Eighth Army. Regulations for the British transport ship forbade mascot and pet animals. To get around this restriction, Wojtek was officially drafted into the Polish Army as a private and listed among the soldiers of the 22nd Artillery Supply Company. During the Battle of Monte Cassino, Wojtek helped his unit convey ammunition by carrying 45 kg (100 lb) crates of 10 kg (25 lb) artillery shells. While this story generated debate over its accuracy, at least one account exists of a British soldier recalling seeing a bear carrying crates of ammunition. This service also earned him promotion to the rank of corporal.
- Sergeant Reckless was an American horse in the Korean war. Her most significant accomplishment came during the Battle of Panmunjom-Vegas, when in one day 51 solo trips, carrying 386 recoilless rounds (over 4,000 kg (9,000 lb)) as well as several wounded men, covering over 55 km (35 mi). The whole Battle of Vegas lasted 3 days. She was wounded twice during the battle: once when she was hit by shrapnel over the left eye and another time on her left flank. For her accomplishments during the Battle of Vegas Hill, Reckless was promoted to corporal. When not on the front lines, Reckless packed other items for the platoon, and was particularly useful for stringing telephone wire. She could string as much wire as twelve men on foot.
- Oxen have been used widely in war as beasts of burden, especially to transport heavy or siege artillery through heavy terrain.
- Both Sweden and, later, the Soviet Union, attempted to utilize moose as deep-snow cavalry. Moose were discovered to be unsuitable for warfare, as they easily contracted livestock diseases, were difficult to feed, and fled the battleground. The Soviets later trained moose not to be gun-shy, but were unable to make use of their cavalry because of the Soviet-Finnish War and World War II.
- Sled dogs have seen use in warfare as transportation and beasts of burden in cold, snowy regions of the world, particularly in Siberia and the Arctic. The French utilized imported Alaskan sled dogs to navigate the Vosges mountains in World War I. During World War II, the Alaska Territorial Guard used sled-dogs as its one of its most reliable means of transportation. The Danish military retains a dog sledding unit, the Sirius Dog Sled Patrol, for reconnaissance purposes in Greenland.
- Non-sled dog breeds have seen use as lesser beasts of burden, with the purpose of carrying small amounts of gear, such as ammo or first aid kits, or in pulling sledges of wounded soldiers away from the battlefield.
- Reindeer have seen military use for much the same roles as sled dogs, as beasts of burden in snowy regions of the world. A deer transportation battalion was utilized by the Red Army in World War II on the Karelian Front by the Finno-Soviet border. The indigenous Evens and Evenki peoples of Siberia were known to use reindeer as cavalry, though only for mounted archery.

=== As weapons ===
==== As fighters or mounts ====
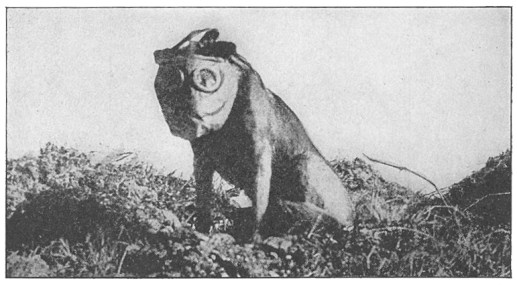
A dog employed by the Sanitary Corps during World War I to locate wounded soldiers. It is fitted with a gas mask.

- The Sumerians used hybrid donkeys to pull their war chariots around 2500 BC.
- Dogs were used by the ancient Greeks for war purposes, and they were undoubtedly used much earlier in history. The Roman Empire, starting with Marcus Aurelius, also used dogs in combat. The Romans trained the Molossian dog (or Canis Molossus) specifically for battle, often coating them in protective spiked metal collars and mail armour, and arranging them into attack formations. During their conquest of Latin America, Spanish conquistadors used Alaunts to kill warriors in the Caribbean, Mexico and Peru. Mastiffs, as well as Great Danes, were used in England during the Middle Ages, where their large size was used to scare horses to throw off their riders or to pounce on knights on horseback, disabling them until their master delivered the final blow.
- Ramses II had a pet lion which fought with him during the Battle of Kadesh.
- Pliny the Elder wrote about the use of pigs against elephants. As he relates it, elephants became scared by the squeal of a pig and would panic, bringing disaster to any soldiers who stood in their path of flight.

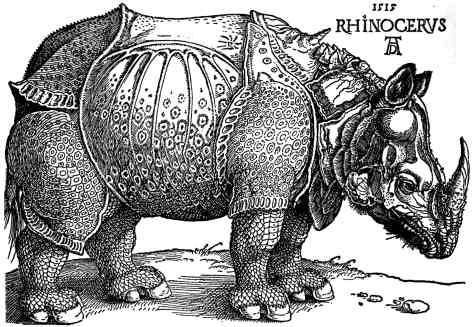
Dürer's Rhinoceros, a fanciful 'armoured' depiction.

- It is unsubstantiated that rhinoceros were used for war functions. By analyzing Albrecht Dürer's famous 1515 woodcut Dürer's Rhinoceros, it is possible that the liberties taken with the rhino's design were in fact designs for a suit of armour created for the rhinoceros's fight in Portugal. However, rhinos' apparently 'thick' or 'plated' skin is actually susceptible and the animals have poor eyesight, heavily limiting their ability to run in a specific direction. Their overly aggressive nature would make them unsuitable for use in mounted combat.
- War elephants were widely used in most parts of South Asia and North Africa, and were also employed by the Diadochi kingdoms, the Kingdom of Kush and the Roman Empire. They were usually equipped with armour and tusk swords and carried a howdah with soldiers and were controlled by a mahout. The Khmer Empire used ballista elephants, war elephants equipped with ballista-like weapons.
- Cattle, in some instances, saw use in battle through manmade stampedes of panicking herds that were driven towards the enemy. This was often a dangerous tactic to those that released them, especially following the invention of gunpowder. In both the Battle of Tondibi and Henry Morgan's siege of Panama, herds of cattle were released onto the battlefield, but stampeded back into their own army's lines due to gunfire from the opposing army.
- During the Warring States period of Chinese history, Qi general Tian Dan is said to have had 1,000 oxen dressed and painted like dragons, then their tails lit on fire and sent against the opposing Yan army.

==== As living bombs ====
- Historical accounts of incendiary pigs were recorded by the military writer Polyaenus and by Aelian. Both writers reported that Antigonus II Gonatas' siege of Megara in 266 BC was broken when the Megarians doused some pigs with combustible pitch, crude oil or resin, set them alight, and drove them towards the enemy's massed war elephants. The elephants bolted in terror from the flaming, squealing pigs, often killing great numbers of their own soldiers by trampling them to death.
- Blue Peacock was a British tactical nuclear weapon project in the 1950s. A technical problem is that during winter, the temperature of buried devices can drop quickly, creating a possibility that the mechanisms of the mine will cease working due to low temperatures in the winter. Various methods were studied to solve this problem. One proposal suggested that live chickens would be sealed inside the casing, with a supply of food and water. They would remain alive for approximately a week. Their body heat would apparently have been sufficient to keep the mine's components at a working temperature. This proposal was sufficiently outlandish that it was taken as an April Fool's Day joke when the Blue Peacock file was declassified on 1 April 2004 Tom O'Leary, head of education and interpretation at the National Archives, replied to the media that, "It does seem like an April Fool but it most certainly is not. The Civil Service does not do jokes."
- According to Pr. Shi Bo, monkeys were used in the beginning of the Southern Song dynasty, in a battle between rebels of the Yanzhou (Yasuo) province and the Chinese Imperial Army, led by Zhao Yu. The monkeys were used as live incendiary devices. The animals were clothed with straw, dipped in oil and set on fire. They were set loose into the enemy's camp, thereby setting the tents on fire, and driving the whole camp into chaos.
- In 1267, the sheriff of Essex was accused of plotting to release flying cockerels carrying bombs over London.
- Anti-tank dogs – a Soviet, World War II weapon that had mixed success. Canines with explosives strapped to their backs were used as anti-tank weapons.
- Project Pigeon – a proposed U.S. World War II weapon that used pigeons to guide bombs.
- Bat bomb, a U.S. project that used Mexican free-tailed bats to carry small incendiary bombs.
- Animal-borne bombs have been used by modern terrorists and insurgents in the Middle East, who have affixed explosives to animals, sometimes left wandering alone, and other times ridden by suicide bombers, in modern insurgent attacks in the Middle East.
- Rocket cats

==== To conceal explosive devices ====
- Exploding rat – dead rats were prepared for use by the British Special Operations Executive in World War II against Germany. Rat carcasses were filled with plastic explosives, to be left in locations such as factories where, it was hoped, the stoker tending a boiler would likely dispose of the unpleasant discovery by shoveling it into the furnace, causing it to explode. The rats contained only a small amount of explosive; however, a puncture of a high-pressure boiler could trigger a devastating boiler explosion.
- Animals' carcasses have been used to camouflage roadside improvised explosive devices during the Iraqi insurgency.

=== Deception and psychological warfare ===
- In Battle of Thymbra (547 BC), the Persians used baggage camels to create a barrier around their archers, since the smell of the camels disrupted the Lydian horses.
- In the Battle of Pelusium (525 BC) between the Achaemenid Empire and Ancient Egypt, Polyaenus claimed that the Achaemenid forces held cats in front of them as psychological tactic against the Egyptians, whose archers did not shoot for fear of harming what they considered to be sacred animals.
- In the Battle of Ager Falernus (217 BC), Hannibal Barca had torches attached to the horns of bulls before being set alight during nightfall and allowing them to run amok. The Romans, believing the torchlight was from fleeing Carthaginian soldiers, pursued the cattle and were caught in an ambush.

=== In communications ===
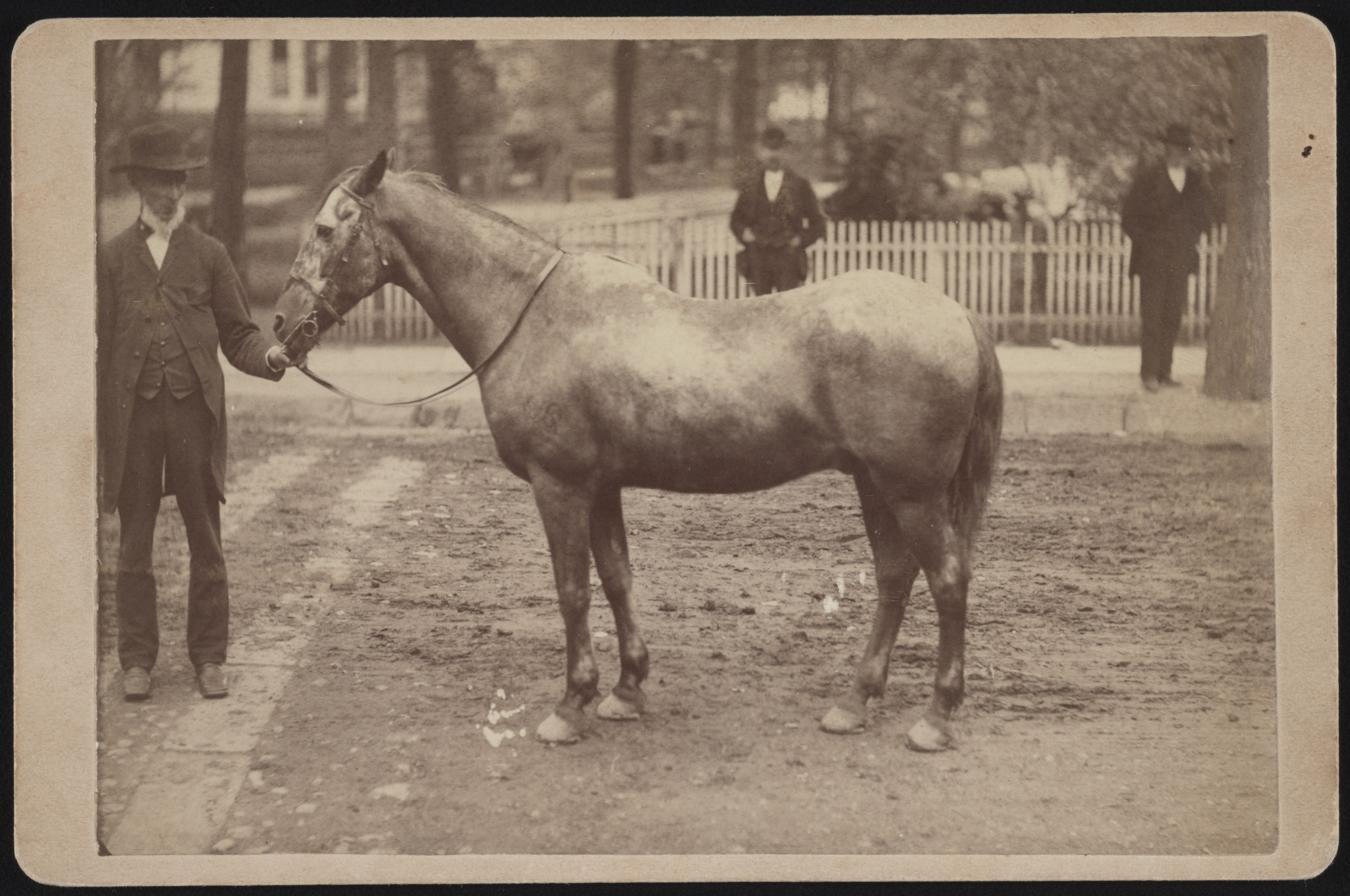
Charlie, the horse who carried the dispatch from General Slocum to General Sherman announcing the surrender of Atlanta, Georgia in the American Civil War

Homing pigeons have seen use since medieval times for carrying messages. They were still employed for a similar purpose during World War I and World War II. In World War II, experiments were also performed in the use of the pigeon for guiding missiles, known as Project Pigeon. The pigeon was placed inside so that they could see out through a window. They were trained to peck at controls to the left or right, depending on the location of a target shape.

Some dogs also saw use as messengers.

=== For morale ===
There is a long-standing tradition of military mascots – animals associated with military units that act as emblems, pets, or take part in ceremonies.

=== For espionage ===
In the years before the First World War pigeon photography was introduced to military intelligence gathering. Although employed during major battles like at Verdun and Somme, the method was not particularly successful. Various attempts in this direction were made during the Second World War as well. A CIA pigeon camera dating from the 1970s is displayed in the CIA Museum; details of CIA missions using this camera are still classified. During the Cold War, the CIA began using ravens and crows for surveillance.

The Acoustic Kitty was a US CIA project to use surgically modified cats to spy on the Kremlin and Soviet embassies in the 1960s. Despite expenditure of around US$10 million, the project failed to produce practical results and was cancelled in 1967. Documents about the project were declassified in 2001. In 2006, The Independent ran a story that the "Pentagon develops brain implants to turn sharks into military spies".

In 2007, Iranian authorities captured 14 squirrels, which were allegedly carrying spying equipment. The story was widely dismissed in the West as "nuts".

A number of spying scares in the Middle East involved birds. According to Israeli ornithologist Yossi Leshem, Sudanese authorities detained an Egyptian vulture in the late 1970s, and a white pelican in the early 1980s, both carrying Israeli equipment used for animal migration tracking. A more mediatized event was the 2011 capture by a Saudi farmer of a griffon vulture, which was eventually released by the Saudi authorities after they determined that the Israeli equipment it carried was used for scientific purposes. This was followed by international mockery and criticism of the Arab media outlets which uncritically had reported on the bird's alleged role in espionage. In 2012, a dead European bee-eater tagged with an Israeli leg band was found by villagers near the south-eastern Turkish city of Gaziantep. The villagers worried that the bird may have carried a micro-chip from Israeli intelligence to spy on the area. Turkish authorities examined the corpse of the bee-eater and assured villagers that it is common to equip migratory birds with rings in order to track their movements.

=== For locating hazards ===
Dogs have been used for detecting mines; they were trained to spot trip wires, as well as mines and other booby traps. They were also employed for sentry duty, and to spot snipers or hidden enemy forces.

On land, giant pouched rats such as the Gambian giant pouched rat have been tested with considerable success as specialised mine detecting animals, as their keen sense of smell helps in the identification of explosives and their small size prevents them from triggering land mines.

Chickens were used during the Gulf Wars to detect poisonous gases in an operation called Kuwaiti Field Chicken (KFC); the designation of the US Marines for chickens used in this role was Poultry Chemical Confirmation Devices. The plan was put on hold after 41 of 43 chicken used for such purposes died within a week of arrival in Kuwait.

Beginning during the Cold War, research has been done into the uses of many species of marine mammals for military purposes. The U.S. Navy Marine Mammal Program uses military dolphins and sea lions for underwater sentry duty, mine clearance, and object recovery.

=== Other specialized functions ===
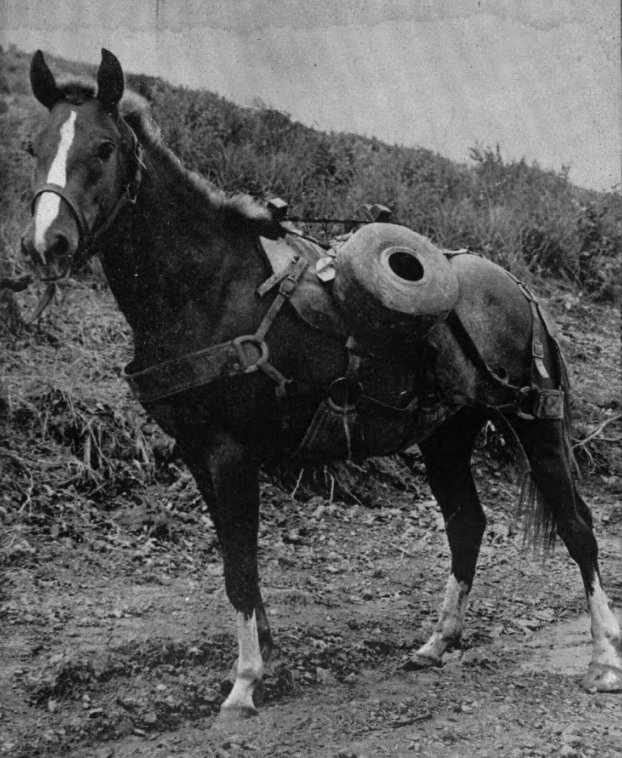
Pictured with a reel of communication wire, Sergeant Reckless was a highly decorated US Marine Corps artillery horse in the Korean War.

"Mercy dogs" were paramedic dogs used in the World Wars and Korean War. Their purpose was to locate and guide medics towards injured soldiers following large battles, or to directly carry medical supplies to the injured soldiers so that they could treat themselves as battles were ongoing.

Ship's cats were used in the Royal Navy to control vermin on board ships. Able seacat Simon of HMS Amethyst received the Dickin Medal.

During the Spanish Civil War (1936–1939), Nationalist pilots attached fragile supplies to live turkeys, which descended flapping their wings, thus serving as parachutes which could also be eaten by the defenders of the monastery of Santa Maria de la Cabeza.

Furthermore, use of military chickens was proposed in the British Blue Peacock project. The scheme involved burying nuclear bombs in the ground for later detonation should occupied (West) Germany be overrun by Warsaw Pact forces. The primitive electronic devices of the 1950s were unreliable in frozen ground, and the chickens were considered as a source of biogenic heat. This story has often been reported as an April Fool's joke, but when it was declassified and proven to be a true story on 1 April 2004 (April Fool's Day), the head of education and interpretation at the UK National Archives said, "It does seem like an April Fool but it most certainly is not. The Civil Service does not do jokes."

A secret 1960s CIA project known as Project OXYGAS envisioned dolphin saboteurs trained to attach explosive devices to enemy ships.

In 2019, Hvaldimir, a beluga whale found with a Russian harness, which had a GoPro camera mount but no camera, and the words "Equipment St Petersburg" (written in English) may have been trained as a guard whale or a spy.

Since the Russian invasion of Ukraine, Germany experimented with Madagascar hissing cockroaches fitted with miniature backpacks, using SWARM Biotactics technology to remotely steer and coordinate them for covert reconnaissance, such as navigating rubble or enclosed urban spaces to collect visual and sensor data where conventional robots or soldiers cannot easily operate.

== See also ==
- Animal–industrial complex
- Animal training
- Biological warfare
  - Entomological warfare
- Cruelty to animals
- Parachuting animals
- Remote control animal
- Brain implant § Research and applications
- Ship's cat
