= Arye Sharuz Shalicar =

German-Israeli spokesman for the IDF

- Hebrew: אריה שרוז שליקר; Persian: آریه شهروز شالی‌کار
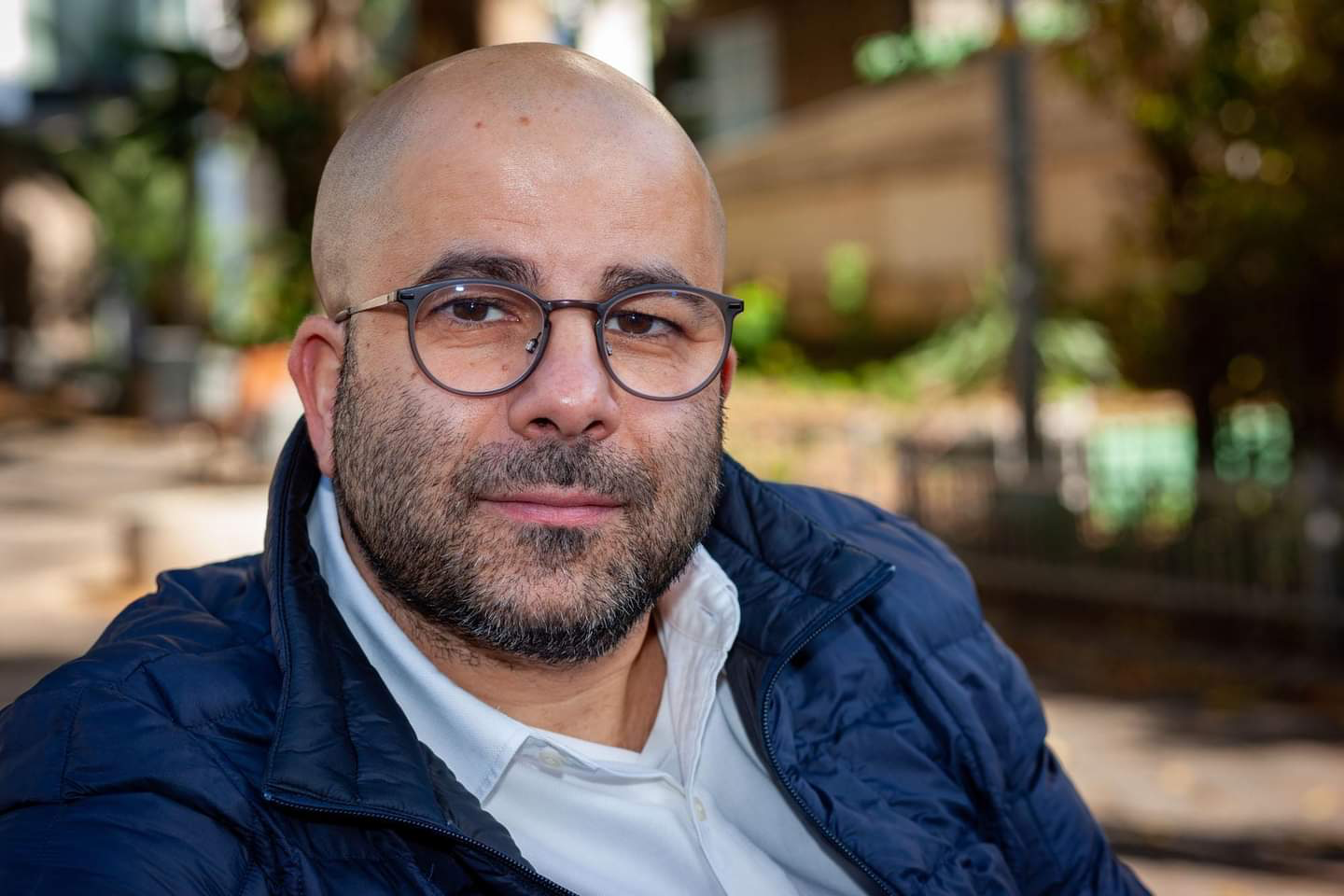
- Shalicar in 2023

Personal details
- Born: August 13, 1977 (age 49) Göttingen, Germany
- Children: 2
- Profession: Author; gangster; military officer; spokesman

Military service
- Allegiance: Israel
- Branch/service: Israel Defense Forces
- Years of service: 2001-present
- Rank: Major

Arye Sharuz Shalicar (Hebrew: אריה שרוז שליקר; Persian: آریه شهروز شالی‌کار; born August 13, 1977) is a German-Israeli author, Israel Defense Forces spokesman, and former gangster of Persian Jewish origin. He has been a spokesperson of the IDF since 2024, having previously held the position from 2009 to 2017.

== Biography ==
Shalicar was born to Iranian Jewish immigrants in Göttingen on August 13, 1977. His mother, Rose, and his father, David, were natives of Babol, Mazandaran, Iran. His father was a soldier in the army of Pahlavi Iran. He had a secular upbringing in Germany. At home, the family only spoke Persian. At 13, his family moved to Berlin-Wedding, with a high proportion of Muslims. He went by his middle name Sharuz, and tried to avoid exhibiting his Jewish faith. However, he began to take pride in Judaism after visiting his family in Ashdod during vacation. He later met Husseyn, a Kurd from Lebanon who led a street gang. Shalicar told him he was Jewish, and Husseyn, being Muslim, surprised Shalicar by offering him protection. At the age of 17, he admitted to being involved in a stabbing of a Turkish teenager who had insulted the gang, although he was not arrested. Recalling his youth, Shalicar said his mother cried every night and his father threw him out of the house multiple times, telling him "You are not my son anymore." Shalicar began to establish ties with Kurdish gangsters, but remained unaffiliated. He first joined The Black Panthers, a mostly Turkish street gang. He later joined the Berlin Street Gangsters, a gang of diverse ethnic origins.

He was primarily involved in graffiti and hip-hop. Shalicar initially planned to release an album, although he instead opted to work and eventually move to Israel. After graduating from high school in 1997, Shalicar did his basic German military service as a paramedic.

Afterwards, he began studying political science, as well as Jewish studies and Islamic studies at the Free University of Berlin. He had previously studied social sciences at the Humboldt University of Berlin. In 2001, he emigrated to Israel to "lead a life of belonging, a life without curious eyes, a life as a Jew". Some of his family members are Jewish settlers in the West Bank. In Israel, he joined the IDF in 2001 as paratrooper support. In 2006, Shalicar received a bachelor's degree in political science from the Hebrew University of Jerusalem. He later received a master's degree in European Studies with honours in 2009.

In 2006, he worked for the Jewish Agency for Israel and also worked at an ARD studio in Tel Aviv. From October 2009 to early 2017, he was one of the four official spokesmen of the IDF. In 2017, he transferred to the reserve forces and became a spokesman again following the October 7 attacks in 2023. In 2017, amid Pro-Palestine protests in Germany, he threatened the protestors who burnt Israeli flags, claiming that Israeli authorities knew who they were and that they should "live in fear". In May 2024, he announced that he was no longer an IDF spokesman. However, he became a spokesman again on September 25. Shalicar was named as the spokesperson for the newly established Israeli military Turkish language account on Twitter in March 2025.
