= Ernst-Wilhelm Modrow =

German World War II fighter pilot

- Born: 5 May 1908; Stettin, German Empire
- Died: 10 September 1990 (aged 82); Kiel, Germany
- Military career
- Allegiance: Nazi Germany; West Germany
- Branch: Luftwaffe; German Air Force
- Service years: 1939–45; 1950s–64
- Rank: Major (Wehrmacht); Oberstleutnant (Bundeswehr)
- Units: KGr.z.b.v. 108; LTS (See) 222; NJG 1
- Conflicts: See battles World War II: Norwegian Campaign; Battles of Narvik; North African Campaign; Defense of the Reich
- Awards: Knight's Cross of the Iron Cross
- Other work: Pilot with SCADTA and Luft Hansa

Ernst-Wilhelm Modrow (5 May 1908 – 10 September 1990) was a German night fighter pilot in the Luftwaffe of Nazi Germany. He was recipient of the Knight's Cross of the Iron Cross. Modrow, along with four other pilots, was the 45th most successful night fighter pilot in the history of aerial warfare. He was credited with 34 nocturnal aerial victories, including one de Havilland Mosquito, claimed in 259 combat missions, 109 of which flown at night. Modrow was the leading proponent of the Heinkel He 219. All but one of his 34 successes were claimed in this aircraft.

== Early life and career ==
Modrow was born on 5 May 1908 in Stettin, at the time in the Province of Pomerania in the Kingdom of Prussia. Today, Stettin is Szczecin, the capital city of the West Pomeranian Voivodeship in Poland. Modrow began his civil flight training in 1929 worked as a pilot for the Colombian-German Air Transport Society (SCADTA—Sociedad Colombo Alemana de Transportes Aéreos) from 1933 to 1937. Modrow then flew the postal routes to South America with the Deutsche Luft Hansa from May 1937 to August 1939.

== World War II ==
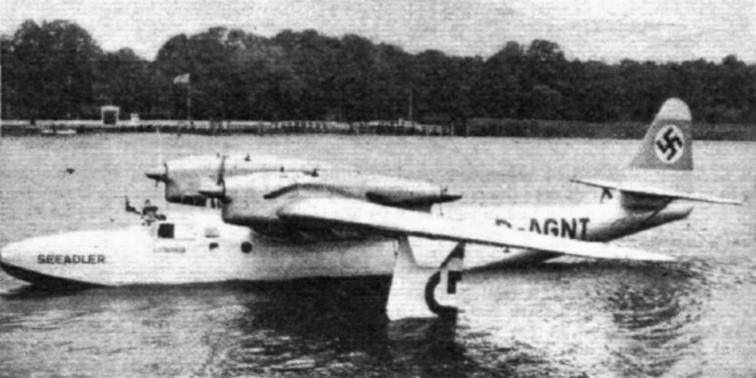
Dornier Do 26 "Seeadler", destroyed on 28 May 1940

World War II in Europe began on Friday 1 September 1939 when German forces invaded Poland. Modrow was posted to Kampfgruppe zur besonderen Verwendung 108 (KGr.z.b.v. 108—Fighting Group for Special Use) to fly the Dornier Do 26 flying boat. With this unit he flew maritime aerial reconnaissance and supply missions into Narvik during the Norwegian campaign. On 28 May 1940, his Do 26 D-AGNT "Seeadler" and another Do 26 were moored at Rombaksfjord when they came under attack by Royal Air Force (RAF) Hawker Hurricane fighters from No. 46 Squadron led by the New Zealander Flight Lieutenant Patrick Jameson. During the attack, Modrow was severely injured and both aircraft destroyed. In March 1941, following a period of convalescence, he was posted to Blindflugschule 1 (1st Blind Flying School) as an instructor. In April 1942, for one year, Modrow was posted to the Mediterranean Theatre, flying more than 100 transport missions with the Blohm & Voss BV 222 flying boat with the Lufttransportstaffel (See) 222 (LTS (See) 222—222nd Air Transport Squadron Sea). In April 1943, he was transferred to the Luftwaffe Erprobungsstelle See (Maritime Test Site) at Travemünde.

=== Night fighter ===
A map of part of the Kammhuber Line. The 'belt' and night fighter 'boxes' are shown.

Following the 1939 aerial Battle of the Heligoland Bight, RAF attacks shifted to the cover of darkness, initiating the Defence of the Reich campaign. By mid-1940, Generalmajor (Brigadier General) Josef Kammhuber had established a night air defense system dubbed the Kammhuber Line. It consisted of a series of control sectors equipped with radars and searchlights and an associated night fighter. Each sector named a Himmelbett (canopy bed) would direct the night fighter into visual range with target bombers. In 1941, the Luftwaffe started equipping night fighters with airborne radar such as the Lichtenstein radar. This airborne radar did not come into general use until early 1942.

In October 1943, Modrow was trained as night fighter pilot and was posted to I. Gruppe (1st group) of Nachtjagdgeschwader 1 (NJG 1—Night Fighter Wing 1). (Note: For an explanation of the meaning of Luftwaffe unit designation see Organisation of the Luftwaffe during World War II.) At the time, the group was under the command of Hauptmann (Captain) Manfred Meurer and was involved in the evaluation of the then new Heinkel He 219 night fighter under combat conditions. On the night of 7/8 March 1944, he claimed his first aerial victory, a de Havilland Mosquito, claimed shot down at 22:30 approximately 2 kilometres (1.2 miles) south of Venlo Airfield. On 30/31 March 1944, Modrow claimed two Handley Page Halifax shot down. The first Halifax was claimed at 04:13 north-northwest of Abbeville, the second at 04:30 south of Abbeville. One of the aircraft shot down by Modrow was Halifax HX322 NP-B from No. 158 Squadron piloted by Flight Sergeant Albert Brice. Of the crew of seven, only Sergeant Kenneth Dobbs, the wireless operator who bailed out, survived the crash near Caumont. The RAF endured its heaviest losses in the strategic bombing campaign of Germany that night. Out of more than 700 planes participating in the Nuremberg raid, 106 were shot down or crash landed on the way home to their base, and more than 700 men were missing, as many as 545 of them dead. More than 160 became prisoners of war. In April 1944, although first tests of the He 219 proved the aircraft to be superior to the Messerschmitt Bf 110 in the night fighter role, the Ministry of Aviation (Reichsluftfahrtministerium) was debating whether to cancel the He 219 production. As part of the assessment team, Modrow rated the He 219 to be faster than the Bf 110. He stated that flying the Bf 110, he would not have shot down the two bombers. In comparison to the Bf 110, the He 219 is much easier to handle in flight, and even in difficult weather conditions, the He 219 proved easier to land.

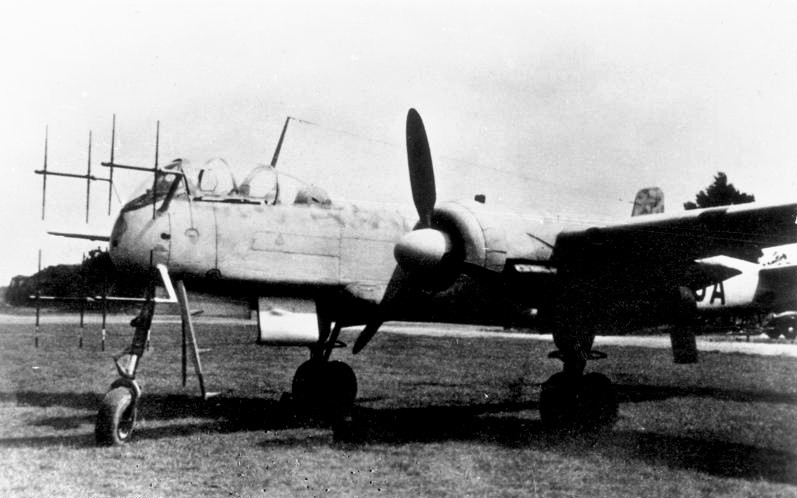
A Heinkel He 219 similar to those flown by Modrow

On 1 April 1944, Modrow was appointed Staffelkapitän (squadron leader) of the 1. Staffel (1st squadron) of NJG 1. On 22/23 April 1944, Modrow was credited with three Avro Lancaster bombers destroyed. He might have misidentified the second and third claim of the night. His second claim might have been Halifax LW633 from No. 425 "Alouette" Squadron of the Royal Canadian Air Force (RCAF), which crashed at 01:55 roughly 30 kilometres (19 miles) southeast of Gilze-Rijen. The other Halifax could have been LV780 from No. 424 "Tiger" Squadron, RCAF. The aircraft crashed at 02:04 about 25 kilometres (16 miles) southeast of Gilze-Rijen. On 27/28 May 1944, three Lancasters shot down were claimed by him, two at 02:25 and 02:35 at 'Brisbar' or 'Bisbar' (probably beacon "Eisbär" (Note: Beacon "Eisbär"—At Lemmer in 52°52′N 5°35′E)) respectively, and a third at 03:28 at Durbuy. He claimed the destruction of a Mosquito at 02:50 on 10/11 June 1944 approximately 8 kilometres (5 miles) south of Alkmaar. The aircraft was Mosquito BX.VI MM125 from No. 571 Squadron piloted by Flight Lieutenant Joe Downey (DFM). The aircraft was returning from Berlin when it came under attack by Modrow. Hit by a short burst of cannon fire, Downey ordered navigator Pilot Officer Ronald Arthur Wellington to bail out. Wellington escaped from the burning aircraft just prior to the midair explosion which killed Downey. Two nights later, he filed claim for the destruction of three Lancaster bombers. The first bomber was claimed at 01:27 at Freiburg, the second at 01:31 about 10 kilometres (6.2 miles) west-northwest of Amiens, and the third Lancaster at 01:46 near Krefeld.

On 21/22 June 1944, Modrow claimed four Lancasters shot down, taking his total to 25 aerial victories. That night, RAF Bomber Command had targeted the oil refineries at Wesseling, south of Cologne. No. 44, No. 49 and No. 619 Squadron lost six Lancasters each in this attack. The first two Lancasters were claimed at beacon "Gorilla" at 01:12 and 01:24 respectively. (Note: Beacon "Gorilla"—At Schoonrewoerd in 51°55′N 5°6′E) The third Lancaster was claimed at 01:39 north-northwest of Duisburg and the fourth at 02:01 north of Deelen. (Note: According to Hichliffe and Obermaier, Modrow claimed five victories on 21/22 June 1944. This would make him an "ace-in-a-day", a term which designates a fighter pilot who has shot down five or more airplanes in a single day.) On 18/19 August 1944, was credited with a Lancaster shot down, claimed at 02:09 near Zoutkamp. Following this aerial victory, Modrow was awarded the Knight's Cross of the Iron Cross (Ritterkreuz des Eisernen Kreuzes) on 19 August 1944. The presentation was made by Generalmajor Walter Grabmann, commander of 3. Jagd Division, on 1 September 1944 at Venlo. He claimed his 34th and last aerial victory, a Halifax bomber, on 5/6 January 1945.

== Later life ==
Following World War II, Modrow served in the Bundeswehr until 1964, and retired holding the rank of Oberstleutnant (lieutenant colonel). He died on 16 September 1990 in Kiel. He was interred at the Parkfriedhof Eichhof in Kiel.

== Summary of career ==
=== Aerial victory claims ===
Mathews and Foreman, authors of Luftwaffe Aces—Biographies and Victory Claims, researched the German Federal Archives and found records for 34 aerial victory claims. This number includes two de Havilland Mosquito aircraft, five Halifax, 25 Lancaster and two further four-engined bombers of unknown type. All of his aerial victories were claimed in nocturnal combat over the Western Front in defence of the Reich.

Victory claims were logged to a map-reference (PQ = Planquadrat), for example "PQ HF". The Luftwaffe grid map (Jägermeldenetz) covered all of Europe, western Russia and North Africa and was composed of rectangles measuring 15 minutes of latitude by 30 minutes of longitude, an area of about 360 square miles (930 km^{2}). These sectors were then subdivided into 36 smaller units to give a location area 3x4km in size.

Chronicle of aerial victories
Claim	Date	Time	Type	Location	Serial No./Squadron No.
– 2. Staffel of Nachtjagdgeschwader 1 –
1	7 March 1944	22:30	Mosquito	south of Venlo	
2	31 March 1944	04:13	Halifax	vicinity of Abbeville	Halifax LW500/No. 640 Squadron RAF
3	31 March 1944	04:30	Halifax	vicinity of Abbeville	
4	23 April 1944	01:10	Lancaster	Düsseldorf	Lancaster ND353/No. 7 Squadron RAF
5	23 April 1944	01:55	Lancaster	30 km (19 mi) southeast of Gilze en Rijen	
6	23 April 1944	02:04	Lancaster	30 km (19 mi) southeast of Gilze en Rijen	
7	25 April 1944	00:05	Lancaster	18 km (11 mi) northeast of Liège	Lancaster ND328/No. 100 Squadron RAF
8	25 April 1944	03:34	Lancaster	northeast of Liège	
9	2 May 1944	00:25	Halifax	30–50 km (19–31 mi) northwest of Brussels	Halifax MZ593/No. 51 Squadron RAF
10	12 May 1944	00:26	Lancaster	15 km (9.3 mi) southeast of Goes	
11	12 May 1944	01:04	Lancaster	PQ HF, over the North Sea	
12	13 May 1944	00:02	Halifax	5 km (3.1 mi) north of Bergen	Lancaster ND924/No. 635 Squadron RAF
13	13 May 1944	01:00	four-engined bomber	over the North Sea	
14	22 May 1944	01:41	Lancaster	20 km (12 mi) south-southwest of Finthorn	
15	23 May 1944	01:25	Lancaster	2.5 km (1.6 mi) south of Assen	Lancaster NE118/No. 626 Squadron RAF
16	28 May 1944	02:25	Lancaster	vicinity of 'Brisbar'	
17	28 May 1944	02:35	Lancaster	vicinity of 'Brisbar'	
18	28 May 1944	03:28	Lancaster	Durbuy	
– 1. Staffel of Nachtjagdgeschwader 1 –
19	11 June 1944	02:50	Mosquito	8 km (5.0 mi) south of Alkmaar	Mosquito MM125/No. 571 Squadron RAF
20	13 June 1944	01:27	Lancaster	Frisburg	Lancaster LM156/No. 15 Squadron RAF
21	13 June 1944	01:31	Lancaster	10 km (6.2 mi) west-northwest of Amiens	
22	13 June 1944	01:46	Lancaster	vicinity of Krefeld	
23	22 June 1944	01:12	Lancaster	southeast of beacon "Gorilla"	Lancaster ME704/No. 9 Squadron RAF
24	22 June 1944	01:24	Lancaster	beacon "Gorilla"	
25	22 June 1944	01:39	Lancaster	330° from Duisburg	Lancaster ED532/No. 467 Squadron RAAF
26	22 June 1944	02:01	Lancaster	west of Cologne	
27	21 July 1944	01:57	Lancaster	40 km (25 mi) southwest of beacon "Biber" (Note: Beacon "Biber"—At Oostvoorne in 51°55′N 4°6′E)	
28	19 August 1944	03:09	Lancaster	vicinity of Zoutkamp	Halifax LW538/No. 51 Squadron RAF
29	30 August 1944	03:51	four-engined bomber	PQ LT/05 Ost	Lancaster LM116/No. 103 Squadron RAF
30	23 September 1944	22:40	Lancaster	45 km (28 mi) west-northwest of Düsseldorf	
31	23 September 1944	23:11	Lancaster	75 km (47 mi) west-northwest of Düsseldorf	
32	6 November 1944	19:24	Lancaster	PQ GP	
33	6 November 1944	19:28	Lancaster	PQ GP	Lancaster LM742/No. 619 Squadron RAF
34	5/6 January 1945	—	Halifax		

=== Awards ===
- Knight's Cross of the Iron Cross on 19 August 1944 as Hauptmann and Staffelkapitän of the 1./Nachtjagdgeschwader 1
- German Cross in Gold on 1 January 1945 Hauptmann in the 1./Nachtjagdgeschwader 1
