= Dornier Do 18 =

1935 multi-role flying boat family by Dornier

Do 18
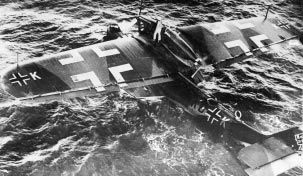

General information
- Type: Flying boat
- Manufacturer: Dornier
- Primary users: Luftwaffe Deutsche Luft Hansa
- Number built: 170

History
- First flight: 15 March 1935

The Dornier Do 18 was a development of the Do 16 flying boat. It was developed for the Luftwaffe, but Deutsche Luft Hansa received five aircraft and used these for tests between the Azores and the North American continent in 1936 and on their mail route over the South Atlantic from 1937 to 1939.

On 27–29 March 1938, a "Do 18 W" established a seaplane record, flying non-stop a straight distance of 8,391 km (5,214 mi) from Start Point, Devon to Caravelas in Brazil.

== Design and development ==
In 1934, the Dornier Flugzeugwerke started development of a new twin-engine flying boat to replace the Dornier Do J "Wal" (Whale) in both military and civil roles. The resultant design, Do 18, retained the layout of the Wal, with a metal hull fitted with distinctive stabilising sponsons, and powered by two engines above the wing in a push-pull layout, but was aerodynamically and hydrodynamically more efficient. It was planned to be powered by two of the new Junkers Jumo 205 Diesel engines. Although heavy, these promised to give much lower fuel consumption than conventional petrol engines of similar power.

The first prototype, the Do 18a, registration D-AHIS (and named Monsun by Deutsche Luft Hansa) flew on 15 March 1935, powered by two of the earlier 410 kW (550 hp) Junkers Jumo 5c Diesels as the planned Jumo 205s were not yet available. It was lost on 2 November 1935 over the Baltic Sea during high-speed tests. Three further prototypes followed, two (the Do 18d and Do 18b) being prototype military aircraft, and the Do 18c (later redesignated Do 18 V3), a civil prototype.

The Do 18c was delivered to Deutsche Luft Hansa as a Do 18E civil transport (D-ABYM Aeolus), quickly followed by a further two aircraft, (D-AANE Zyklon and D-ARUN Zephir) with a final Do 18E (D-AROZ Pampero) being built in 1938.

A further civil Do 18 was the Do 18F, a modified aircraft with longer wingspan and higher weights built for extended-range flights. The sole Do 18F, D-ANHR, first flew on 11 June 1937. It was later modified with 656 kW (880 hp) BMW 132N radial engines to test a possible upgrade for the Luftwaffe's aircraft, flying in this form on 21 November 1939 as the Do 18L. It suffered cooling problems, however, and further development of the radial powered Do 18 was abandoned.

== Operational history ==
=== Civil service ===
In 1936, Deutsche Luft Hansa started a series of endurance trials, culminating on 10–11 September when Zephir, flown by Flugkapitän Blankenburg with Deutsche Luft Hansa Director Freiherr von Gablenz as passenger, was launched by catapult from the seaplane tender Schwabenland at Horta, Azores, flying the 4,460 km (2,270 mi) to New York City in 22 hours 12 minutes. Also on 11 September, Aeolus flew from Horta to Hamilton, Bermuda in 18 hours 15 minutes, continuing to New York the next day. For the main leg of the North Atlantic the aircraft needed the help of the catapult on Schwabenland. On 22 September Aeolus returned to Horta in 17:50 h (3850 km). Zephir was catapulted on 28 September at Hamilton. Further flights to New York followed on 5–6 and 6–7 October and the return flights this time, 17 and 18 October from Sydney, Nova Scotia. The flying boats did not wait for their tender and went on to Lisbon and Travemünde.

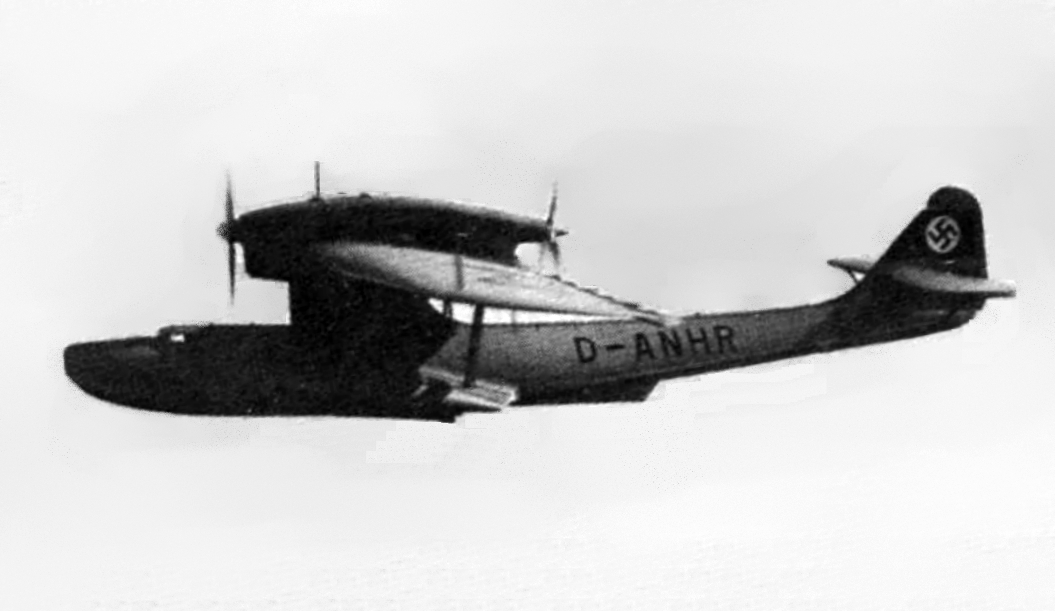
The Do 18 D-ANHR in 1938.

In April 1937, D-ARUN Zephir and D-ABYM Aeolus started service on the South Atlantic mail route from Bathurst, now Banjul, Gambia to Natal, Brazil (3040 km). Catapult ships were based in Bathurst and Fernando de Noronha to allow the aircraft to cross the Atlantic carrying a full load of mail.

In June they were joined by V6 D-AROZ Pampero. Aeolus was lost on 30 July 1937, when it had to make an ocean landing due to engine problems and was heavily damaged when Ostmark tried to retrieve the plane. Pampero (20 August) and Zephir (29 January 1938) also had to make ocean landings. Pampero was lost at sea nearly without trace on 1 October 1938 with a crew of five.

Deutsche Luft Hansa's fifth aircraft was the only Do 18F V7 D-ANNE Zyklon, that first took to the skies on 11 June 1937. This was the only Do 18 with a wider span, which enabled it to stay in the air with one engine out. This was a special demand of Deutsche Luft Hansa. Zyklon was used over the South Atlantic between September 1937 and March 1939. The Do 18s crossed the South Atlantic 73 times.

Zyklon is not the aircraft that established the England to Brazil distance record from 27–29 March 1938 as often stated.
The record-setting aircraft D-ANHR was taken from the military production line and was specially prepared. It was flown as a builder's machine with a Deutsche Luft Hansa crew augmented by the works pilot Gundermann. On the way back to the South American station the seaplane tender Westfalen took the aircraft into the English Channel where it was catapulted to Brazil. On the record flight the conditions were not optimal and the Do 18 did not reach Rio de Janeiro as planned.

=== Military use ===
In Luftwaffe service, it was obsolete by the outbreak of World War II, but, as the only military flying boat, 62 (58 serviceable) Do 18s equipped a Staffel in each of five Kürstenfliegergruppen (Coastal aviation groups) mainly on North Sea reconnaissance missions. In 1940 some squadrons changed their base to Norway. The vulnerable and underpowered flying boat was soon relegated to training and the air/sea rescue role. In the middle of 1941, only one squadron was still operational on Do 18. The Blohm & Voss BV 138 had superseded the Dornier.

A Do 18 was the first German aircraft to be shot down by British aircraft during the war, when one of a formation of three was caught over the North Sea by nine Fleet Air Arm Blackburn Skua fighter-bombers of 803 Naval Air Squadron flying from HMS Ark Royal on 26 September 1939. The flying boat was able to make an emergency landing but was sunk by the destroyer HMS Somali.

== Variants ==
=== Civil variants ===
Do 18E
Initial civil version, powered by 410 kW (550 hp) Jumo 205C-1 engines. Four built.
Do 18F
Long range civil version V7 D-ANNE Zyklon, with extended-span (26.30 m (86 ft 3 in)) wings and increased take-off weight. One built.
Do 18L
The record-aircraft D-ANHR modified with BMW 132M radials. One converted.

=== Military variants ===
- The Do 18D 79 built, was the first military version, powered by two 450 kW (600 hp) Jumo 205C engines, armed with one 7.92 mm (0.312 in) MG 15 machine gun in the bow and dorsal positions.
- The Do 18G 62 built, was an improved version, powered by two 656 kW (880 hp) Jumo 205D engines, armed with a 13 mm (0.51 in) MG 131 machine gun in the bow, and a 20 mm MG 151 cannon in a power-operated dorsal turret. This version had an altered bow contour and broader sponsons. Provision for rocket-assisted take off (JATO) was possible.
- The Do 18H 22 built (+ conversions ?) was an unarmed dual-control six seat training version.
- The Do 18N was a designation for unarmed air-sea search and rescue conversions in service with the Seenotdienst

Including the civilian flying boats 170 Dornier Do 18 were built by Dornier in Manzell (48 until March 1939) and Weser Flugzeugbau in Einswarden and Nordenham (122 until August 1940).

== Operators ==
- Germany
  - Deutsche Luft Hansa
  - Luftwaffe

== Specifications (Do 18D-1) ==
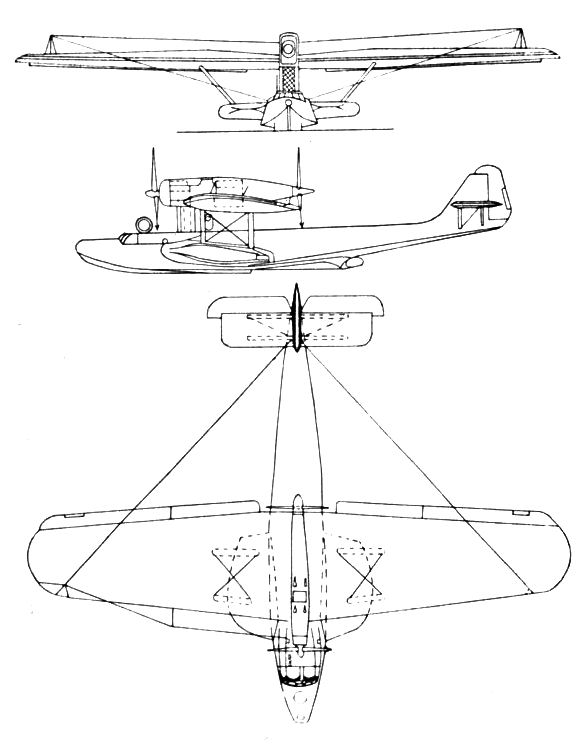
Dornier Do.18 3-view drawing from L'Aérophile August 1936

Data from Aircraft of the Third Reich Volume one, German Aircraft of the Second World War, The Do 18...Dornier's Whale Calf

General characteristics

- Crew: 4
- Length: 19.23 m (63 ft 1 in)
- Wingspan: 23.7 m (77 ft 9 in)
- Height: 5.32 m (17 ft 5 in)
- Wing area: 98 m^{2} (1,050 sq ft) including sponsons
- Empty weight: 6,680 kg (14,727 lb)
- Max takeoff weight: 8,500 kg (18,739 lb) (normal)

10,000 kg (22,000 lb) (catapult)

- Powerplant: 2 × Junkers Jumo 205C-4 6-cylinder opposed-piston diesel engines, 451 kW (605 hp) each
- Propellers: 3-bladed variable-pitch propellers

Performance

- Maximum speed: 250 km/h (160 mph, 130 kn) at sea level
- Cruise speed: 190 km/h (120 mph, 100 kn) (max. endurance)
- Range: 3,500 km (2,200 mi, 1,900 nmi)
- Service ceiling: 4,350 m (14,270 ft)
- Time to altitude: 1,000 m (3,300 ft) in 7 minutes 30 seconds

Armament

- Guns: 2 × 7.92 mm (0.312 in) MG 15 machine guns, one in each of bow and dorsal positions
- Bombs: 2× 50 kg (110 lb) or 2x 100 kg (220 lb) bombs under starboard wing

== See also ==
Related development

- Dornier Do J

Related lists

- List of aircraft of World War II
- List of interwar military aircraft
- List of military aircraft of Germany
- List of flying boats and floatplanes
