= Dornier Do 26 =

1938 multi-role flying boat family by Dornier

Do 26
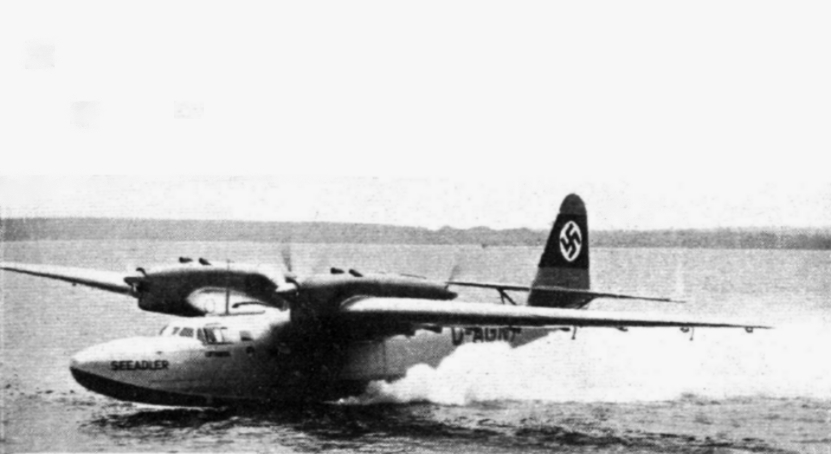
- Dornier Do 26A "Seeadler", 1938

General information
- Type: Transport and reconnaissance flying boat
- Manufacturer: Dornier Flugzeugwerke
- Primary users: Deutsche Lufthansa Luftwaffe
- Number built: 6

History
- Introduction date: 1939
- First flight: 21 May 1938
- Retired: 1945

The Dornier Do 26 was an all-metal gull-winged flying boat produced before and during World War II by Dornier Flugzeugwerke of Germany. It was operated by a crew of four and was intended, in civilian service, to carry a payload of 500 kg (1,100 lb) or four passengers on the Lisbon to New York route. In military service it carried as many as eighteen passengers.

== Design and development ==
The Do 26 was of all-metal construction. The hull had a central keel and a defined step; the wings were of gull wing configuration, the outer sections being equipped with fully retractable narrow stabilising wing-floats, instead of Dornier's famous "water-wing" sponsons extending from the lower hull for lateral stabilization.

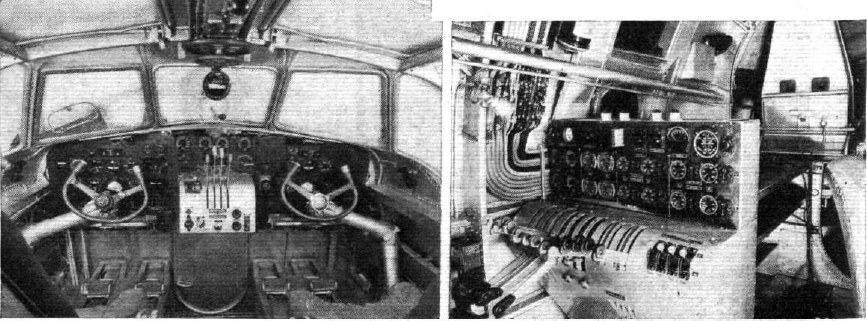
Interior of the Do 26A

Its four engines, Junkers Jumo 205C diesels, were mounted in tractor/pusher pairs in tandem nacelles located at the joint between the dihedral and horizontal wing sections. The rear (pusher) engines could be swung upwards through 10° during take-off and landing, to prevent contact between the three-blade airscrew and water spray created by the forward propellers.

The tail unit was of conventional design, comprising a horizontal tailplane and a single, vertical fin with rudder.

== Operational history ==
=== Pre-war ===
In 1937, Deutsche Lufthansa ordered three Do 26 aircraft, which were designed to be launched by catapult from special supply ships, for transatlantic air mail purposes. The first, Do 26A D-AGNT V1 Seeadler ("Sea eagle"), was piloted on its maiden flight by Flight Captain Erich Gundermann on 21 May 1938; D-AWDS V2 Seefalke ("Sea Falcon"), followed on 23 November 1938, piloted by Flight Captain Egon Fath. Both were completed and handed over to Deutsche Lufthansa before the outbreak of World War II. Due to opposition from the United States, the German airline was unable to operate these aircraft on the intended transatlantic route; instead, in 1939 they were used to carry air mail between Bathurst and Natal on the Southern Atlantic route. The third aircraft, Do 26B D-ASRA Seemöwe ("Seagull") was completed shortly before the start of World War II.

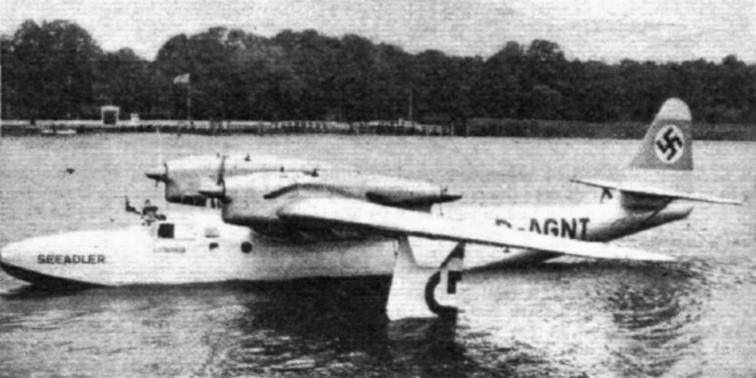
The first Do 26 "Seeadler" in 1938

One Do 26 civilian mission was carried out by V2 Seefalke, when on 14 February 1939 the veteran Deutsche Lufthansa pilot Flight Captain Siegfried Graf Schack von Wittenau embarked on a mercy flight to Chile, taking 580 kg (1,279 lb) of medical supplies for earthquake victims in Chile. The 10,700 km (6,600 mi) flight between Lisbon and Rio de Janeiro lasted 36 hours.

=== World War II ===
All three Deutsche Lufthansa aircraft were impressed into military service in 1939 at the outbreak of World War II, as P5+AH, P5+BH and P5+CH respectively.

Three other Do 26 aircraft (V4 – V6) were built as Do 26 C for the Luftwaffe with the more powerful 648 kW (880 hp) Junkers Jumo 205D engines; the original three aircraft were similarly converted for military service. Armament consisted of one 20 mm MG 151/20 cannon and three 7.92 mm (.312 in) MG 15 machine guns.

==== Norwegian Campaign ====
Allocated initially to KüFlGr (Küstenfliegergruppe/Coastal Aviation Group) 406 (later 506), the Do 26s saw service in April and May 1940 in the Norwegian Campaign, transporting supplies, troops and wounded to and from the isolated German forces fighting at Narvik under the command of General Eduard Dietl. During this campaign three of them were lost:

On 8 May 1940, V2 (ex Seefalke) was shot down by three Blackburn Skuas of 803 Naval Air Squadron, Fleet Air Arm, operating from the Royal Navy aircraft carrier HMS Ark Royal while carrying 18 Gebirgsjägers to the Narvik front. After a running fight V2 crash-landed in Efjorden in Ballangen Municipality. Siegfried Graf Schack von Wittenau, the crew and 18 soldiers, were captured in bloody fighting with Norwegian forces. One of the Skuas, flown by future Fleet Air Arm fighter ace Sub-Lieutenant Philip Noel Charlton, was hit by return fire from V2 and made an emergency landing at Tovik near Harstad.

Then, on 28 May 1940, both V1 (ex Seeadler piloted by Ernst-Wilhelm Modrow) and V3 (ex Seemöwe) were set ablaze with gunfire and sunk at their moorings at Sildvik in Rombaksfjord near Narvik, when discovered and attacked by three Hawker Hurricanes of No. 46 Squadron RAF led by the New Zealander Flight Lieutenant (later Group Captain) P.G. "Pat" Jameson, DSO, DFC and bar shortly after landing. Three mountain guns destined for the German forces fighting in the mountains east of Narvik were lost with the destruction of V1 and V3, whilst one gun was unloaded from one of the aircraft before it was lost.

==== Later World War II service ====
V5 was lost on 16 November 1940, killing its crew, after being launched at night from the catapult ship Friesenland in Brest, France. The fate of V4 and V6, which in 1944 were still assigned to the Test Unit (German: Erprobungsstelle) in Travemünde, is unclear.

== Variants ==
Do 26A
Two prototypes: V1 - D-AGNT Seeadler (Sea Eagle) and V2 - D-AWDS Seefalke (Sea Falcon)
Do 26B
Third prototype: V3 - D-ASRA Seemöwe (Seagull)
Do 26C
Military variant for Luftwaffe, powered by Junkers Jumo 205D engines and armed with 1x 20 mm (0.787 in) MG 151/20 cannon and three 7.92 mm (0.312 in) MG 15 machine guns. Three aircraft built and V1, V2 and V3 were rebuilt to similar standard.

== Operators ==
Germany

- Deutsche Lufthansa operated two Do 26A and one Do 26B between 1938 and 1939. Later all three were handed over to the Luftwaffe.
- Luftwaffe operated all six built aircraft.
  - Erprobungsstelle Travemünde
  - KGr.z.b.V. 108 (operated in Trans-Ozean Staffel/KGr.z.b.V. 108)
  - Küstenfliegergruppe 406 (operated in Sonderstaffel/Ku.Fl.Gr.406)

== Surviving aircraft ==
The wrecks of V1 Seeadler and V3 Seemöwe were located in Norwegian waters off Narvik after the war. Seemöwe has been removed but the fuselage and wings of Seeadler remain in situ (and are an attraction for divers). Some components from Seeadler, including the cockpit instrument panel and a propeller, are on display at the Narvik War Museum; another propeller can be seen at the flying club in Bodø, Norway.

== Specifications – civilian Do 26A ==
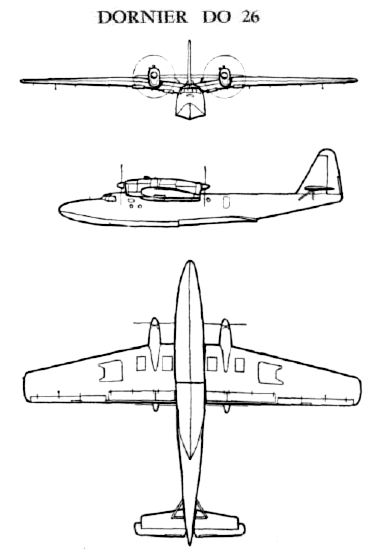

Data from Flugzeug-Typenbuch : Handbuch der Deutschen Luftfahrt- und Zubehör-Industrie 1939/40

General characteristics

- Crew: 4
- Capacity: 500 kg (1,100 lb) payload
- Length: 24.5 m (80 ft 5 in)
- Wingspan: 30 m (98 ft 5 in)
- Height: 6.85 m (22 ft 6 in)
- Wing area: 120 m^{2} (1,300 sq ft)
- Aspect ratio: 7.5
- Empty weight: 11,000 kg (24,251 lb)
- Max takeoff weight: 20,000 kg (44,092 lb)
- Powerplant: 4 × Junkers Jumo 205E 6-cyl water-cooled opposed-piston 2-stroke diesel engine 600 PS (591.8 hp; 441.3 kW)
- Propellers: 3-bladed constant-speed propellers

Performance

- Maximum speed: 335 km/h (208 mph, 181 kn)
- Cruise speed: 305 km/h (190 mph, 165 kn)
  Alighting speed: 110 km/h (68 mph; 59 kn)
- Range: 9,000 km (5,600 mi, 4,900 nmi)
- Service ceiling: 6,000 m (20,000 ft)
- Time to altitude: 1,000 m (3,300 ft) in 3 minutes

== See also ==
Related lists

- List of aircraft of World War II
- List of flying boats and floatplanes

== Bibliography ==
- Hafsten, Bjørn; Ulf Larsstuvold; Bjørn Olsen; Sten Stenersen (1991). Flyalarm – luftkrigen over Norge 1939–1945 (in Norwegian) (1st ed.). Oslo: Sem og Stenersen AS. ISBN 82-7046-058-3.
- Lawrence, Joseph (1945). The Observer's Book Of Airplanes. London and New York: Frederick Warne & Co.
- Munson, Kenneth (1978). German Aircraft Of World War 2 in colour. Poole, Dorset, UK: Blandford Press. ISBN 0-7137-0860-3.
- Thomas, Andrew (2007). Royal Navy Aces of World War 2. Oxford: Osprey Publishing. ISBN 978-1-84603-178-6.
- Vaagland, Per Olav (2003). En infanteribataljon i strid – BN II/IR 15 i slaget om Narvik 1940 (in Norwegian). Oslo: Norwegian Armed Forces Museum. ISBN 82-91218-32-3.
