= Junkers Jumo 205 =

Aircraft diesel engine family

Jumo 205
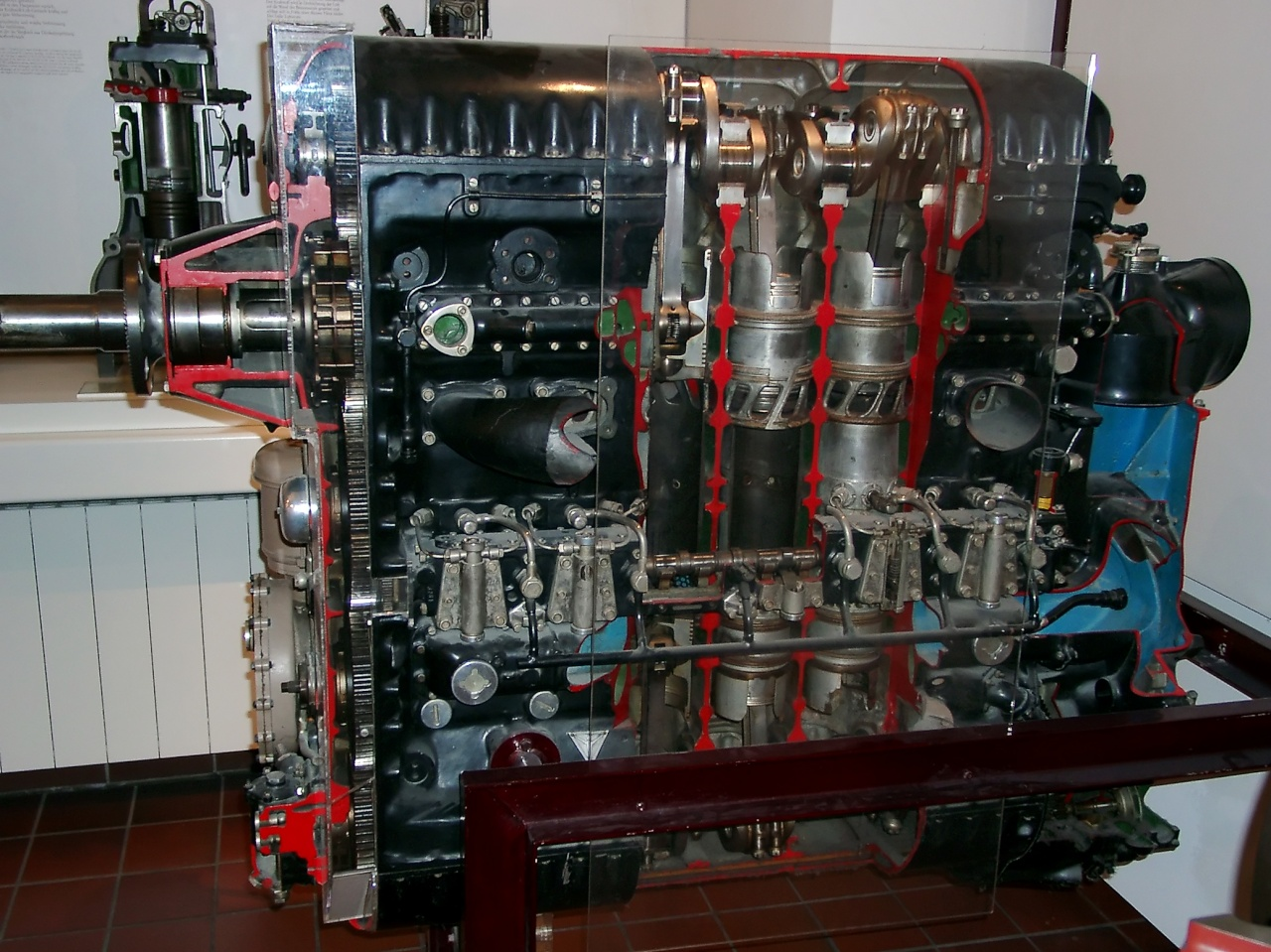
- Jumo 205 cutaway
- Type: Aircraft diesel engine
- Manufacturer: Junkers
- First run: 1930s
- Major applications: Junkers Ju 86; Blohm & Voss BV 138; Blohm & Voss BV 222
- Number built: c. 900
- Developed from: Junkers Jumo 204

The Jumo 205 aircraft engine was the most numerous of a series of aircraft diesel engines produced by Junkers. The Jumo 204 first entered service in 1932. Later engines of this type comprised the experimental Jumo 206 and Jumo 208, with the Jumo 207 produced in some quantity for the Junkers Ju 86P and -R high-altitude reconnaissance aircraft, and the 46 m (151 ft) wingspan, six-engined Blohm & Voss BV 222 Wiking flying boat. All three of these variants differed in stroke and bore and supercharging arrangements. In all, more than 900 of these engines were produced, in the 1930s and through most of World War II.

== Design and development ==
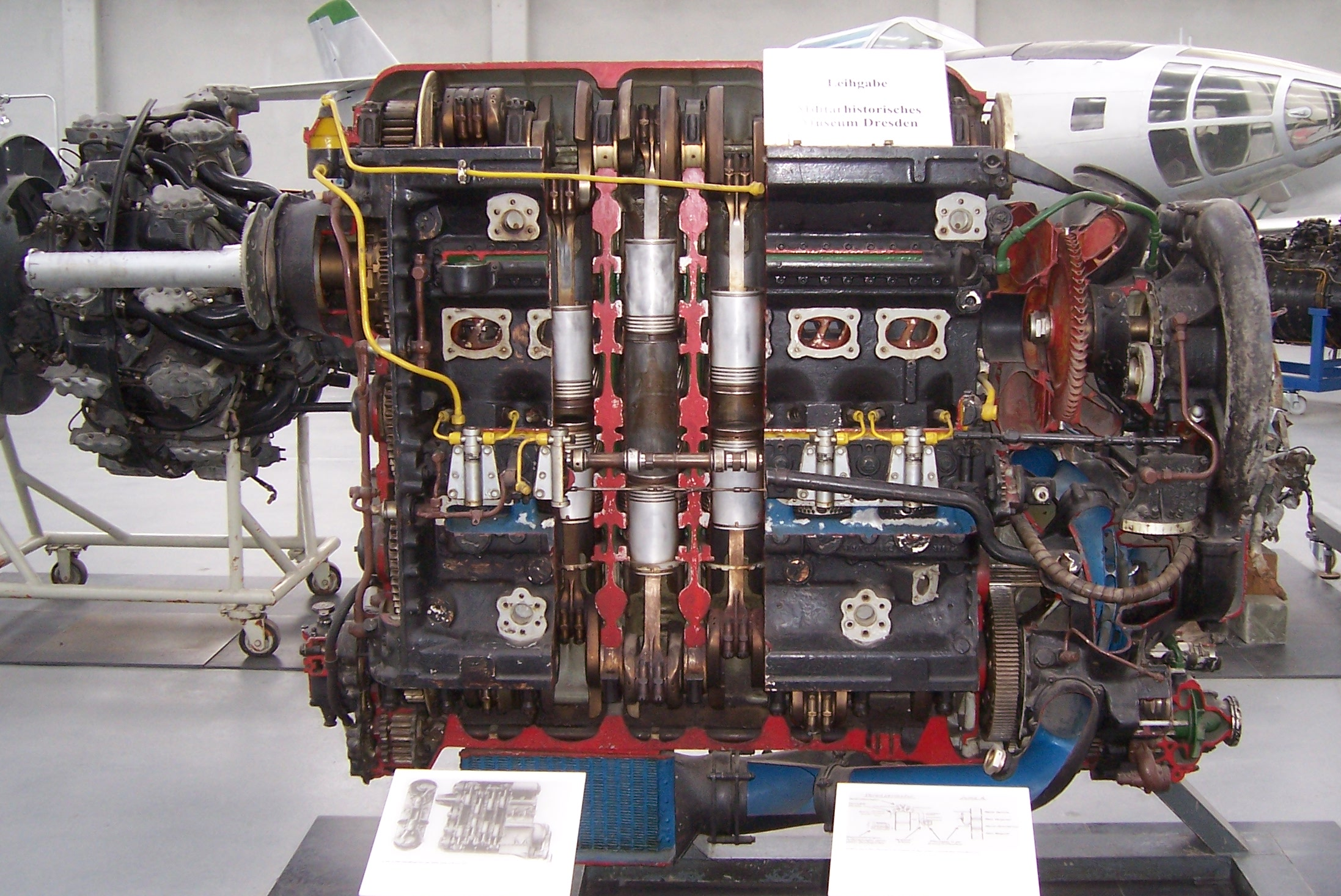
A similarly sectioned Junkers Jumo 207 aviation diesel engine

These engines all used a two-stroke cycle with 12 pistons sharing six cylinders, piston crown to piston crown in an opposed configuration. This unusual configuration required two crankshafts, one at the bottom of the cylinder block and the other at the top, geared together. The pistons moved towards each other during the operating cycle. The intake ports were located at one end of the cylinder, whereas the exhaust ports were at the other end. This made one piston effectively control the intake, and the other control the exhaust. Two cam-operated injection pumps per cylinder were used, each feeding two nozzles, for four nozzles per cylinder in all.

As is typical of two-stroke designs, the Jumos used no valves, but rather fixed intake and exhaust port apertures cut into the cylinder liners during their manufacture, which were uncovered when the pistons reached a certain point in their strokes. Normally, such designs have poor volumetric efficiency because both ports open and close at the same time and are generally located across from each other in the cylinder. This leads to poor scavenging of the burnt charge, which is why valveless two-strokes generally produce smoke and are inefficient.

The Jumo largely addressed this problem through a clever arrangement of the ports. The intake port was positioned under the "lower" piston, while the exhaust port was under the "upper" piston. The lower crankshaft operated 11° behind the upper, causing the exhaust ports to open and close first, which allowed for proper scavenging. This design enabled the two-stroke Jumos to run nearly as cleanly and efficiently as four-stroke engines with valves, but with significantly less complexity.

Some downside exists to this system, as well. For one, since matching pistons were not closing at quite the same time, but one ran "ahead" of the other, the engine could not run as smoothly as a true opposed-style engine. In addition, the power from the two opposing crankshafts had to be geared together, adding weight and complexity, a problem the design shared with H-block engines.

In the Jumo, these problems were avoided to some degree by taking power primarily from the "upper" shaft, somewhat offset upwards on the engine's front end. All of the accessories, such as fuel pumps, injectors and the scavenging compressor, were run from the lower shaft, meaning over half of its power was already used up. What was left over was then geared to the upper shaft, which ran the engine's propeller.

In theory, the flat layout of the engine could have allowed it to be installed inside the thick wings of larger aircraft, such as airliners and bombers. Details of the oil scavenging system suggest this was not possible and the engine had to be run "vertically", as it was on all designs using it.

Because the temperature of the exhaust gases of the Jumo diesel engines was substantially lower than that of comparable carburettor engines, it was easier to add a turbocharger for higher altitudes. This was explored in the Jumo 207 which used the energy of the exhaust gases to increase the power at high altitudes. The turbocharger was combined with a mechanically driven blower, so that the turbocharger creates the first stage of compression, and the mechanical blower the second stage. At low load and startup, the turbocharger does not contribute to supercharging the engine, but the mechanical blower provides enough air for the engine to operate. At high load, however, the turbocharger receives sufficient quantities of exhaust gas, which means that it alone can provide enough supercharging without the need of the inefficient mechanical blower. The addition of the turbocharger to the mechanical blower made the engine more powerful without significantly increasing its specific fuel consumption.

== Variants ==
Jumo 205 C
Produced 600 hp (440 kW) at 2,200 rpm
Jumo 205 D
First military version, delivering 880 hp (656 kW) at 3,000 rpm.
Jumo 205 E
Rated at 700 hp (522 kW) at 2,600 rpm.
Jumo 206
An experimental version. Development halted in favour of the Jumo 208.
Jumo 207A
High-altitude version with two inline centrifugal superchargers and a precooler.
Jumo 207 B-3
Had an improved turbocharger and featured GM-1 nitrous oxide injection.
Jumo 207 C
Optimised for medium altitude. Produced in small series for the Blohm & Voss BV 222.
Jumo 207 D
Optimised for medium altitude. Cylinder diameter increased from 105 mm to 110 mm. Maximum power at ground level was 1,200 hp (880 kW). Prototypes only.
Jumo 207 E
Similar to the 207 C but greater performance at high altitude. Project only.
Jumo 207 F
Optimised for higher altitude. Two-stage turbocharger. Development stopped in 1942.
Jumo 208
With greater displacement, resulting in a maximum power of 1,500 hp (1,100 kW) at medium altitude. Bench tested but not produced.
Jumo 218
A 12-cylinder version, the Jumo 218, was designed but never built.
Jumo 223
A single 24-cylinder four-crankshaft Jumo 223 was built and tested.
Jumo 224
Larger than the Jumo 223 by combining 4 Jumo 207 C engines.
CLM Lille 6As
A license-built version from CLM Lille, delivering 650 hp (480 kW)(CLM was the predecessor to the Indenor engine maker, a sister company to Peugeot)
CLM Lille 6BrS
A developed version of the 6As used to power the Bernard 86
Fairbanks Morse 38 8-1/8
Licensed-produced US version for marine and locomotive applications, still in production.

== Applications ==
The Jumo 205 powered early versions of the Junkers Ju 86 bomber, but was found too unresponsive for combat and liable to failure at maximum power, common for combat aircraft. Later versions of the design also used the engine for extreme high-altitude use, as with the Ju 86P and -R versions for high-altitude reconnaissance over the British Isles. In January 1940, the Luftwaffe tested the prototype Ju 86P with Jumo 207A-1 turbocharged diesel engines. It was far more successful as a power unit for airships, for which its characteristics were ideal, and for noncombat applications such as the Blohm & Voss Ha 139 airliner. Its more fuel-efficient operation lent itself for use on Germany's few maritime patrol flying-boat designs during World War II, such as the BV 138 and BV 222.

The licensed-produced Fairbanks Morse variant was used extensively by the United States, and is still in active service in US Navy submarines. It was also reverse-engineered by the Soviet Union for similar applications.

=== Applications list ===
- Blohm & Voss BV 138
- Blohm & Voss Ha 139
- Blohm & Voss BV 222
- Dornier Do 18
- Dornier Do 24 (V1 and V2 prototypes)
- Dornier Do 26
- Junkers Ju 86

== Specifications (Jumo 205E) ==
Data from Flugzeug-Typenbuch. Handbuch der deutschen Luftfahrt- und Zubehör-Industrie 1944

=== General characteristics ===
- Type: six-cylinder liquid-cooled inverted inline
- Bore: 105 mm (4.13 in)
- Stroke: 160 mm (6.30 in) x2
- Displacement: 16.62 L (1,014.21 cu in)
- Length: 2,051 mm (80.7 in)
- Width: 600 mm (23.6 in)
- Height: 1,325 mm (52.2 in)
- Dry weight: 570 kg (1,257 lb) dry, unequipped

=== Components ===
- Supercharger: engine driven supercharger at 8.85:1
- Fuel system: direct injection through four nozzles per cylinder
- Fuel type: Diesel fuel
- Oil system: dry sump, pressure feed with scavenge
- Cooling system: liquid-cooled

=== Performance ===
- Power output:

- 700 PS (690 hp; 515 kW) at 2,500 rpm (5 minutes) at sea level
- 630 PS (621 hp; 463 kW) at 2,420 rpm (30 minutes) at sea level
- 560 PS (552 hp; 412 kW) at 2,250 rpm (max. continuous) at sea level
- 500 PS (493 hp; 368 kW) at 2,000 rpm (cruise) at sea level

- Specific power: 42.1 PS/L (0.68 hp/cu in; 30.96 kW/L)
- Compression ratio: 17:1
- Specific fuel consumption: 0.170 kg/PSh (0.380 lb/(hp⋅h); 0.231 kg/kWh) at max continuous
- Oil consumption: 0.006–0.008 kg/PSh (0.013–0.018 lb/(hp⋅h); 0.008–0.011 kg/kWh)
- Power-to-weight ratio: 1.228 PS/kg (0.549 hp/lb; 0.903 kW/kg)
- B.M.E.P.: 7.6 atm (7.7 bar; 112 psi)
- Reduction gear: 0.633:1

== Other notable opposed-piston engines ==
- Commer TS3 the "Commer Knocker" commercial vehicle engine
- Leyland L60 tank engine, used in the Chieftain tank, was similar in layout to the Junkers Jumo 205 and Napier Culverin.
- Rolls-Royce K60 engine was used in the FV430 series of armoured fighting vehicles and Swedish tank Strv 103.
- Napier Deltic
- Soviet engine 5TDF was used in T-64 tank.
- Soviet engine 6TD was used in T-80UD, T-84, and Al-Khalid tanks.

== See also ==
- Napier Culverin: license built version of the Jumo 204
- Charomskiy ACh-30 and Charomskiy M-40: Soviet four stroke V12 diesel aero engines produced in the 1940s.
- Packard DR-980: American 9-cylinder radial diesel aero engine first flown in 1929.
- List of aircraft engines
