= Junkers Ju 86 =

Airliner and medium bomber aircraft

Ju 86
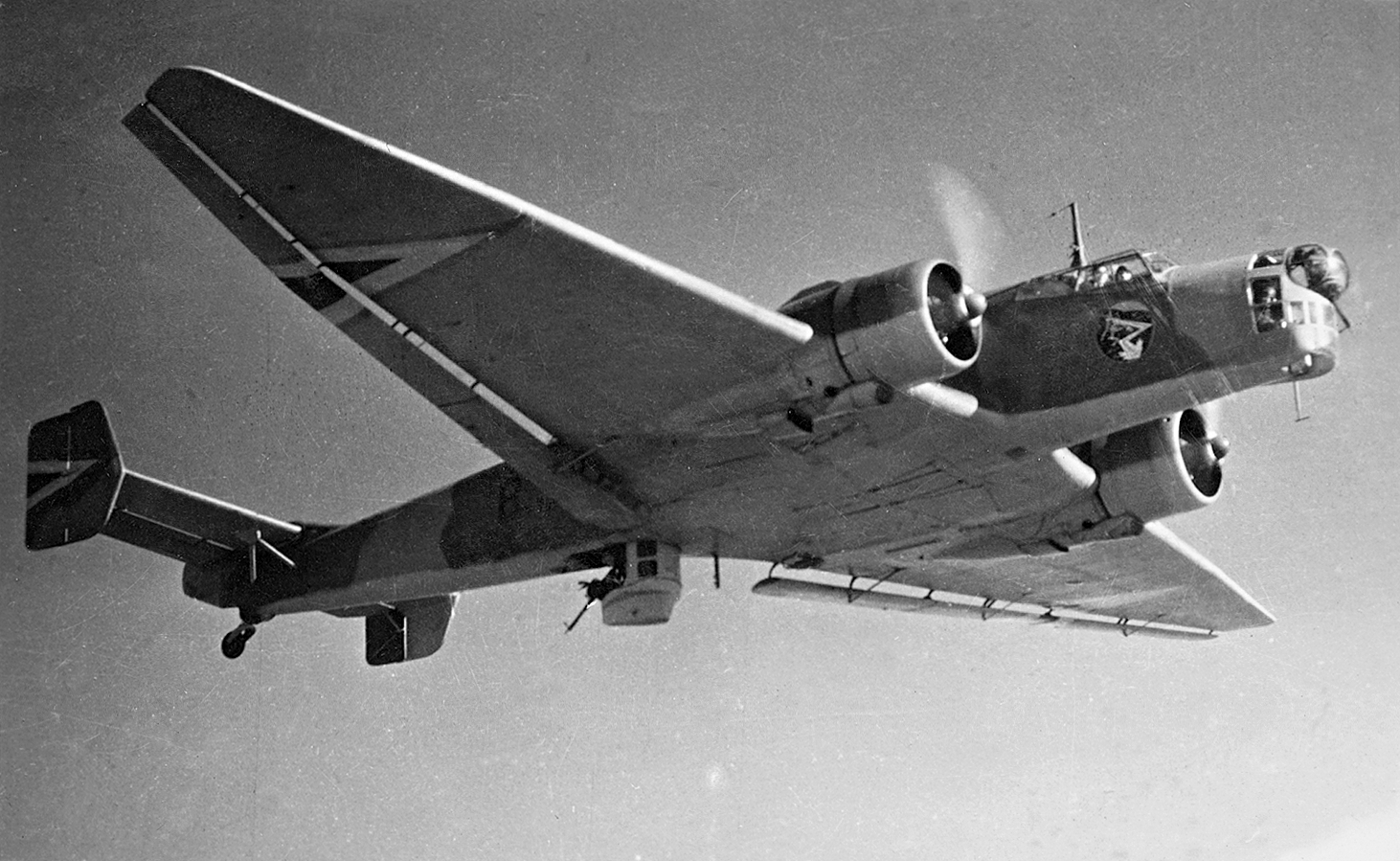
- Ju 86K-2 of Royal Hungarian Air Force, showing the Junkers Doppelflügel wing control surfaces

General information
- Type: Bomber, airliner, reconnaissance aircraft
- Manufacturer: Junkers
- Designer: Ernst Zindel
- Status: retired
- Primary user: Luftwaffe
- Number built: ~900

History
- Introduction date: 1936
- First flight: 4 November 1934
- Retired: 1958 (Swedish Air Force)

The Junkers Ju 86 is a monoplane bomber and civilian airliner designed and produced by the German aircraft manufacturer Junkers.

It was designed during the mid-1930s in response to a specification for a modern twin-engined aircraft suitable for use as both a high-speed airliner and a bomber. Junkers responded with a low-winged twin-engined all-metal monoplane; unusually, it was intended to be powered by Junkers Jumo 205 diesel engines instead of petrol engines for greater fuel efficiency. It also had a smooth metal skin instead of the company's traditional corrugated exterior. On bomber-configured aircraft, bombs were carried vertically in four fuselage cells behind the cockpit; these bomb cells were replaced by seating for up to ten passengers on the civil airliner version of the Ju 86. On 4 November 1934, the first prototype, powered by Siemens SAM 22 radial engines, made its maiden flight; on 4 April 1935, the third prototype, which was the first civil-configured aircraft, flew for the first time.

The civil-oriented Ju 86 models were operated by a range of airlines, including the German flag carrier Deutsche Luft Hansa, Manchukuo National Airways, South African Airways, Iberia Airlines and AB Aerotransport amongst others. Some civilian aircraft would be converted into military aircraft following the outbreak of the Second World War. The type was employed by various air forces on both sides of the conflict, although the first military use of the Ju 86 was during the Spanish Civil War, where it was flown by the Condor Legion with mixed results. The Luftwaffe deployed its Ju 86s during the invasion of Poland, but opted to withdraw its diesel-engined aircraft fairly promptly while the radial-engined Ju 86 models were predominantly assigned to training roles thereafter. During late 1942, Ju 86s, along with all other available transport aircraft, were pulled from training schools to reinforce the Luftwaffe's transport force in its attempt to supply the German 6th Army besieged at Stalingrad, although this attempt was soon ended due to Soviet advances.

The Ju 86P, which emerged in early 1940, could reach high altitudes because of its longer wingspan, pressurized cabin, and Junkers Jumo 207A-1 turbocharged diesel engines. It was used as a reconnaissance aircraft and as a nuisance bomber over England until interception by modified Supermarine Spitfires led to its withdrawal. At one point, Junkers was developing the Ju 86R, fitted with even larger wings and new engines, to attain even higher altitudes, but this model never progressed beyond the prototype stage. Today, only a single Ju 86 is known to exist; it is on permanent static display at the Swedish Air Force Museum outside Linköping.

== Design and development ==
=== Background ===
The origins of the Junkers Ju 86 are closely linked to the clandestine build-up of Luftwaffe during the mid-1930s. During 1934, the recently created German Reichsluftfahrtministerium (RLM) and the German flag carrier Deutsche Luft Hansa worked together to produce a specification for a twin use aircraft, capable of operating both as a high-speed airliner for Deutsche Luft Hansa and as a medium bomber for the Luftwaffe. Distinct civil and military variants of the aircraft were sought; however, where the requirements were not fully compatible with one another, it was deemed that military needs took precedence over those of the civil side of the programme.

Two German aircraft manufacturers, Junkers and Heinkel, were both approached regarding this specification; each company received an initial order for five prototypes (three military and two civil) of their designs, these being the Ju 86 and Heinkel He 111 respectively. Junkers' opted for a low-winged twin-engined monoplane that featured all-metal stressed skin construction. Unlike the majority of Junkers' previous designs, the Ju 86 discarded the typical corrugated skinning in favour of smooth metal skinning, which helped to reduce drag. It was intended to be powered by Junkers Jumo 205 diesel engines, which although heavy, gave better fuel efficiency than conventional petrol engines. This decision made the Ju 86 one of the earliest quantity production aircraft to use diesel propulsion.

The wing of the Ju 86, which was tapered, comprised two primary spars and one auxiliary spar. It was outfitted with distinctive Junkers doppelflügel control surfaces on the wing, similar to those on the Junkers Ju 52, that were hinged below the wing's trailing edge, with the outboard section on each side functioning as an aileron, and the inner section functioning as a wing flap. The aircraft was fitted with a retractable main-gear conventional undercarriage with a fixed tailwheel, and twin fins and rudders. Unusually, the main undercarriage members were attached to the wing roots and outwardly retracted into recesses within the wings; this arrangement meant that the undercarriage had a particularly narrow track.

The bomber aircraft had a crew of four: a pilot, navigator, radio operator/bombardier and gunner. Defensive armament consisted of three machine guns: at the nose, at a dorsal position, and within a retractable ventral position. Bombs were carried vertically in four fuselage cells behind the cockpit. The airliner version replaced these bomb cells with seating for ten passengers; furthermore, the fuel tanks were relocated from the fuselage to the wings.

=== Into flight ===
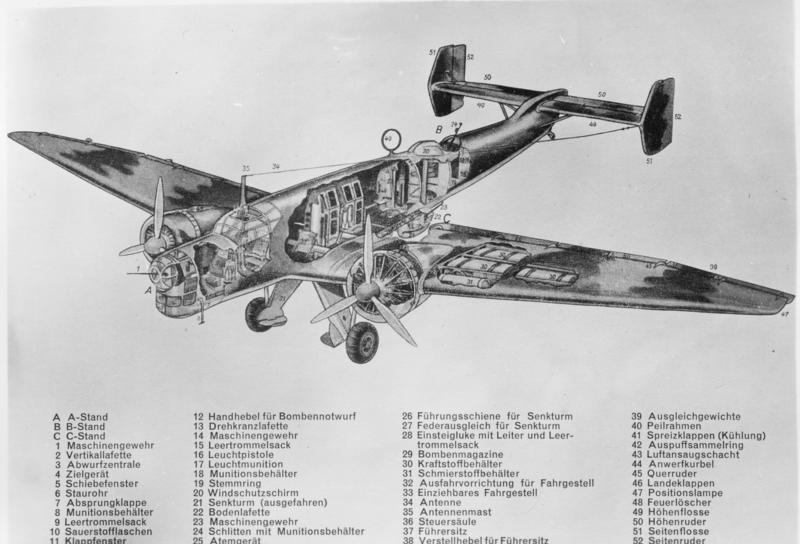
Ju 86 cutaway diagram

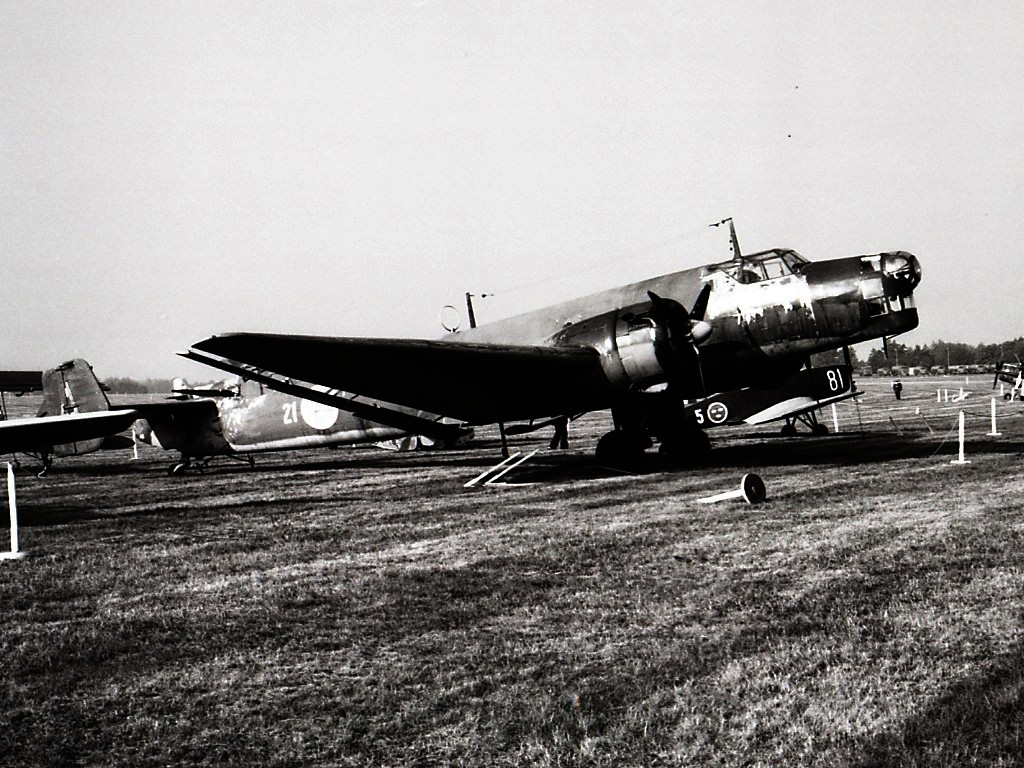
The only complete Junkers Ju 86 remaining (1976)

As the Jumo 205 was unavailable when the first prototype airframe was completed, the bomber-configured Ju 86ab1 was fitted with Siemens SAM 22 radial engines instead when it performed its maiden flight on 4 November 1934. Early flight trials were reportedly demonstrated the prototype to possess unsatisfactory control and stability; modifications were made. The second prototype, which was also a bomber, flew during January 1935. The third Ju 86, the first civil prototype, flew on 4 April 1935. The fourth and fifth prototypes, which were more representative of production aircraft, were furnished with a new wing design with an increased chord, and thereby wing area, towards the tips.

During late 1935, production of both pre-series military and civil aircraft commenced. In April 1936, full-rate production of the Ju 86A-1 bomber was achieved. Many of the early modifications made were centred around increasing the aircraft's stability, such as the addition of a spine-like dorsal fin on the tail end of the fuselage on the Ju 86C. Production was quickly transitioned to the improved Ju 86D, the chief differences of which being a modified tail cone that improved stability and an almost 50 per cent increase in fuel capacity over that of the Ju 86A. During the late 1930s, demand for the type was such that rival firm Henschel became involved in the production program.

Early use of the Jumo-powered Ju 86 bomber in the Spanish Civil War showed that it was inferior to the He 111, with the diesel engines being unsuitable for rough treatment during combat and thus difficult to keep operational. Accordingly, production plans of the type were promptly cut back. One Ju 86 had already been converted to use radial engines as a testbed for possible export versions, and this showed improved reliability. Production switched to a version powered by the BMW 132 engine, the Ju 86E, the production of which continued though to 1938. The sudden end to production without advance warning meant that there were still enough component parts to construct a further 1,000 aircraft.

While the Ju 86 was deemphasised as a bomber as time went on, Junker opted to continue development of the aircraft as a high altitude platform for both reconnaissance and bombing missions. The Ju 86P, which possessed a longer wingspan, pressurized cabin, Junkers Jumo 207A-1 turbocharged two-stroke, opposed-piston diesel engines and a two-man crew, could fly higher than 12,000 m (39,000 ft), where it was felt to be safe from enemy fighters. Furthermore, it could be produced by remanufacturing existing Ju 86D airframes.

During early 1942, Junkers was working on the Ju 86R, which used even larger wings and new engines and was reportedly capable of reaching even higher altitudes – up to 16,000 m (52,500 ft) – in order to continue evading increasingly advanced interceptors. While a few aircraft were built and delivered to the Luftwaffe during 1943, production was limited to a small quantity of aircraft. Further advanced models, such as the Ju 86 R-3 and the Ju 186, but these never left the drawing board.

=== Export variants ===
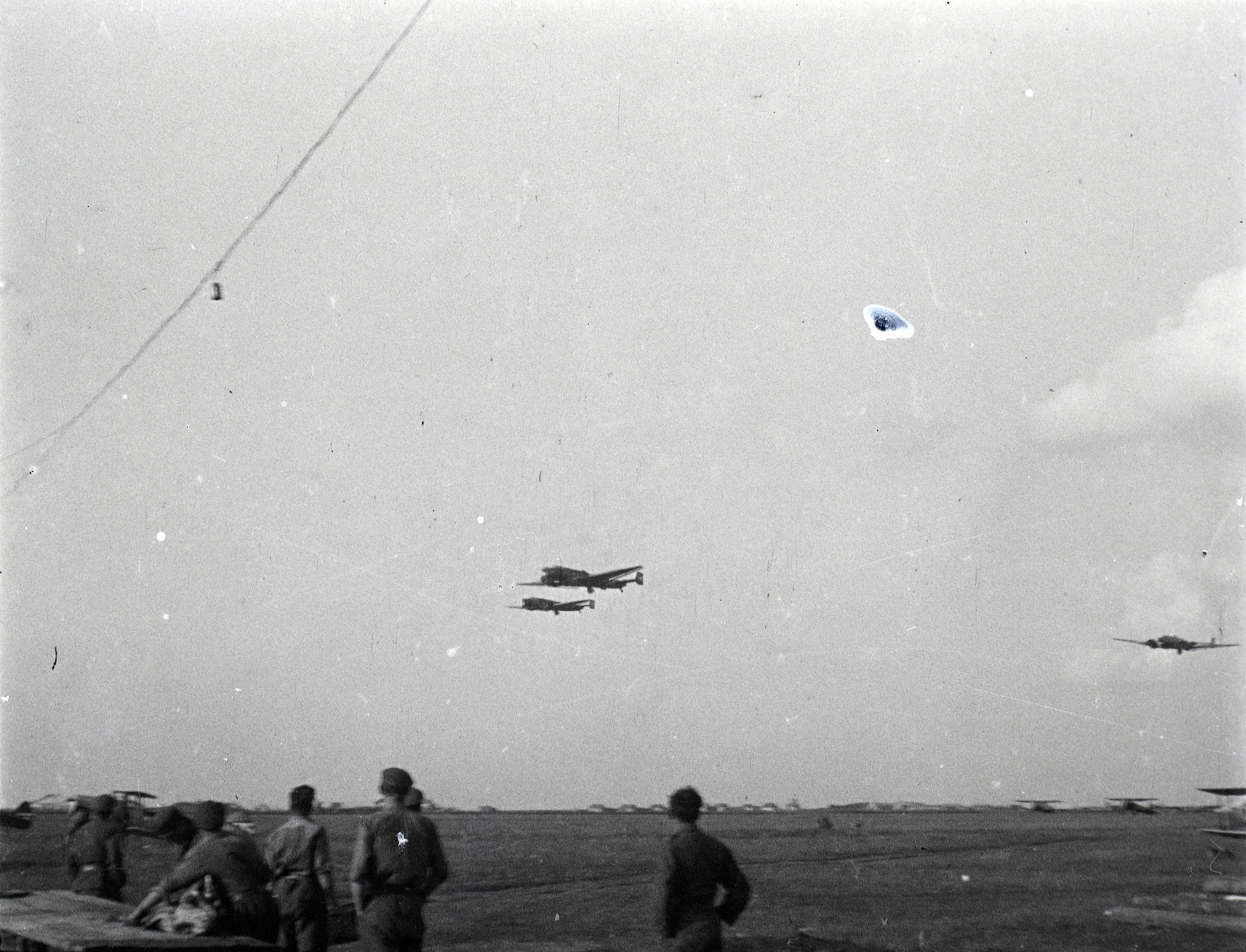
Hungarian Ju-86K-2s, 1941

Civil variants, introduced in 1936, were designated Ju 86Z in three different models differing in their engines. The Jumo-engined Ju 86Z-1 (corresponding to the former B-0 or C-1) was sold to Swissair (one), Airlines of Australia (one), and LAN-Chile (three). The BMW 132H-powered Ju 86Z-2 was sold to DLH (two) and the para-military Manchukuo Air Transport (five or more). The Pratt & Whitney R-1690 Hornet-engined Ju 86Z-7 was delivered to AB Aerotransport (ABA) of Sweden (one, for use as a mail carrier), Lloyd Aéreo Boliviano (three), and South African Airways (SAA) (seventeen). The ABA aircraft was later transferred to the Swedish Air Force, with which it served, under the designation Tp 9, until 1958. South African Airways' original intention was to have its Ju 86s powered by 745 hp Rolls-Royce Kestrels. Six aircraft for SAA, flown with these engines, were refitted with Hornets before delivery, and the remainder were also Hornet-powered.

The Ju 86K was an export model, also built under license in Sweden by Saab as the B 3 with (905 hp) Bristol Mercury XIX radial engines. Several aircraft remained in service with the Swedish Air Force until 1958. A few were converted for radio interception activities.

== Operational history ==
The bomber was field-tested in the Spanish Civil War by the Condor Legion. Four Ju 86D-1s arrived in Spain in early February 1937, but after a few sorties one of them was shot down in late February–early March 1937 by Republican fighters. A replacement aircraft was sent from Germany, but after two more were damaged in landing accidents, the remaining two aircraft were sold to the Nationalist air force, where they remained in service until at least the end of the Civil War. The Ju 86 had proved to be generally inferior to the Heinkel He 111 evaluated at the same time.

A single Gruppe of Ju 86 bombers (III KG 1 "Hindenburg") remained in operational service at the start of the Second World War and were used in the invasion of Poland, but replaced soon after. The diesel-engined Ju 86A and Ds were quickly retired while the radial-engined Ju 86E and Gs were transferred to bomber training schools. Soon after the conflict started, the Luftflotte (Air Fleet) commanders raided their training schools for Ju 52s as transport aircraft, together with their experienced aircrew instructors. This depletion continued with the formation of special bomber crews for the invasions of Norway, the Low Countries, and Crete. This was to a severe blow to the pilot training programme, and Oberstleutnant Lt-Colonel Paul Deichmann, Chief of Staff to the Luftwaffe's Chief of Training Helmuth Wilberg suggested that Ju 86s with dual controls and instruments could be easily produced to replace the appropriated Ju 52s. However, his contention that "the need for air transport services would soon reach tremendous proportions" was simply brushed aside by the commander-in-chief of the Luftwaffe, Hermann Göring.

In late 1942, all available aircraft, including Ju 86s, were pulled out of the training schools to reinforce the Luftwaffe's transport force in its attempt to supply the German 6th Army, besieged at Stalingrad. The Ju 86s formed two transport Gruppen, equipped with 58 aircraft, operating out of Tatsinskaya Airfield. They were unsuited to the transport role, and suffered heavy losses (42 Ju 86s were lost by the end of January 1943) before being forced out of the airlift when the Soviets captured Tatsinskaya, not having the range to reach Stalingrad from the replacement airfields. More than 40 Ju 86s were lost in this endeavour while the survivors were reallocated to training bomber crews.

Ju 86s operated by the Allies in the Second World War included 17 (Note: 18 units had been delivered to the airline during the interwar years) early-model units that had been in use by South African Airways. When the conflict broke out, these aircraft were militarised and armed as bombers with defensive guns and external bomb racks. These aircraft were initially used for coastal patrols along with the sole Ju 86K-1, playing an important role in the interception of the German blockade runner SS Watussi in December 1939. In May 1940, they were used to re-equip No. 12 Squadron SAAF, which was deployed in the East African Campaign from June 1940. It flew its first bombing missions on 14 June 1940. As more modern aircraft became available, the South African Ju 86s were passed from squadron to squadron, seeing their last use with No. 22 Squadron SAAF, which used it along with the Avro Anson in the coastal reconnaissance role, finally retiring its Ju 86s in September 1942.

During March 1939, Hungary used its Ju 86s to bomb Slovak airfields and defensive positions during the Slovak–Hungarian War. From June 1941, Hungary's Ju 86s began to be replaced by Italian Caproni Ca.135 bombers. An independent bomber squadron, equipped with a mix of Ju 86s and Ca 135s was deployed in support of the Hungarian Gyorshadtest (or Fast Corps) during the German-led invasion of the Soviet Union. However, the Ju 86 was withdrawn from front line service by Hungary during 1942.

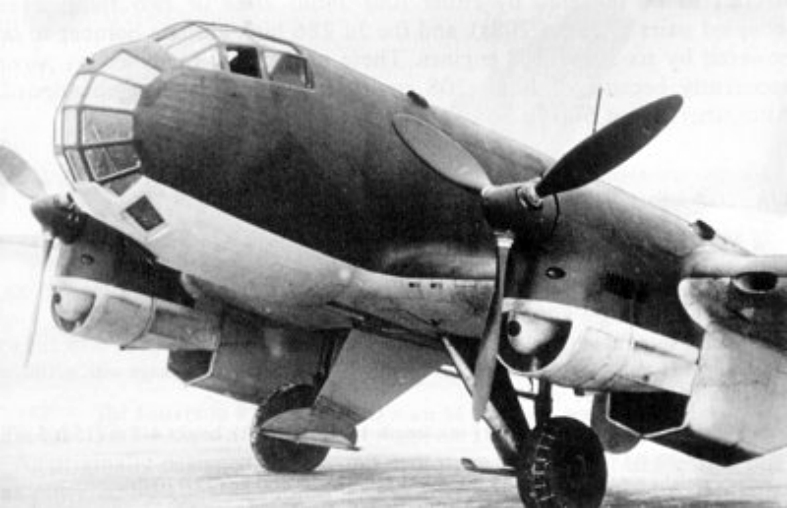
A Ju 86P high-altitude reconnaissance aircraft, with Jumo 207 turbocharged diesel powerplants.

In January 1940, the Luftwaffe evaluated the prototype Ju 86P, which could fly higher than 12,000 m (39,000 ft), where it was felt to be safe from enemy fighters. The British Westland Welkin and Soviet Yakovlev Yak-9PD were developed specifically to counter this threat. Satisfied with the trials of the Ju 86P prototype, the Luftwaffe ordered that some 40 older-model bombers be converted to Ju 86P-1 high-altitude bombers and Ju 86P-2 photo-reconnaissance aircraft, with pressurized fuselage, no armament, and a crew of two.

The Ju 86P operated successfully for some years over Britain, the Soviet Union and North Africa. During early 1941, the reconnaissance version flew sorties over Britain, but these stopped when Hitler invaded Russia (Operation Barbarossa). By mid-1942, the pressurized bomber version was available, and flew about a dozen nuisance raids over southern England. (Note: Each bomber carried a single 250kg bomb, so most drops caused little damage. However, a hit in the middle of Bristol during rush hour killed 48 people and caused major damage.) The RAF created a special interception squadron equipped with modified Supermarine Spitfire Mk IXs, leading to one bomber attempting a raid on Portsmouth being intercepted and damaged on 12 September 1942. After this, no further flights over England were attempted. In August 1942, a modified Spitfire Mk V shot down a Ju 86P over Egypt at an altitude of 14,500 m (49,000 ft). After the loss of two more aircraft, the Ju 86P was withdrawn from service in 1943.

A single unit operated the Ju 86R, which was capable of even greater altitudes than the Ju 86P, between 1943 and mid 1944.

== Surviving aircraft ==
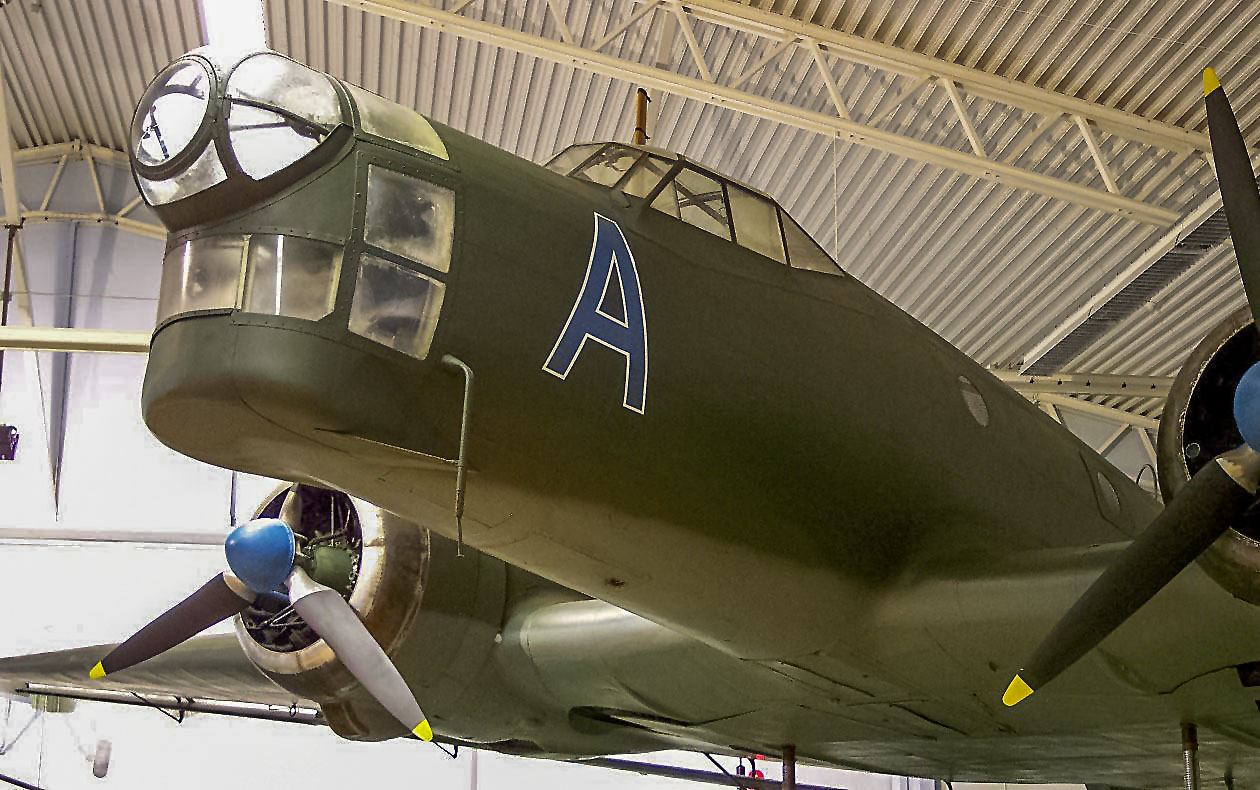
The only remaining complete Junkers Ju 86, displayed at the Swedish Air Force Museum

Only one Junkers Ju 86 is known to exist today. The aircraft was built in Germany and sold to Sweden in 1938. Before it was retired from Swedish service in 1958, the aircraft was used in the 1955 movie Des Teufels General. It is on permanent static display at the Swedish Air Force Museum near Linköping.

== Variants ==
=== Prototypes ===
Ju 86abl
First bomber prototype.
Ju 86bal
Second transport prototype.
Ju 86cb
Third bomber prototype.
Ju 86V4
Prototype for the Ju 86B commercial transport aircraft.
Ju 86V5
Prototype for the Ju 86A bomber aircraft.

=== Production models ===
Ju 86A-0
13 pre-production bomber aircraft.
Ju 86A-1
Initial bomber version.
Ju 86B-0
Seven pre-production transport aircraft.
Ju 86C-1
Six transport aircraft for Deutsche Luft Hansa, powered by two Junkers Jumo 205C diesel engines.
Ju 86D-1
Bomber version.
Ju 86E-1
Bomber version for the Luftwaffe, powered by two BMW 132F radial engines.
Ju 86E-2
Powered by two BMW 132N radials.

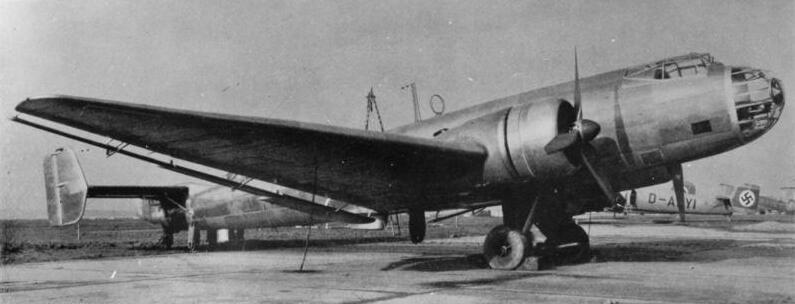
Ju 86G - note the radial engines and rounded glazed nose

Ju 86G-1
Fitted with a round glass nose.
Ju 86E-2
Uprated version of the Ju 86E-1.
Ju 86K-1
Export version for South Africa and Sweden.

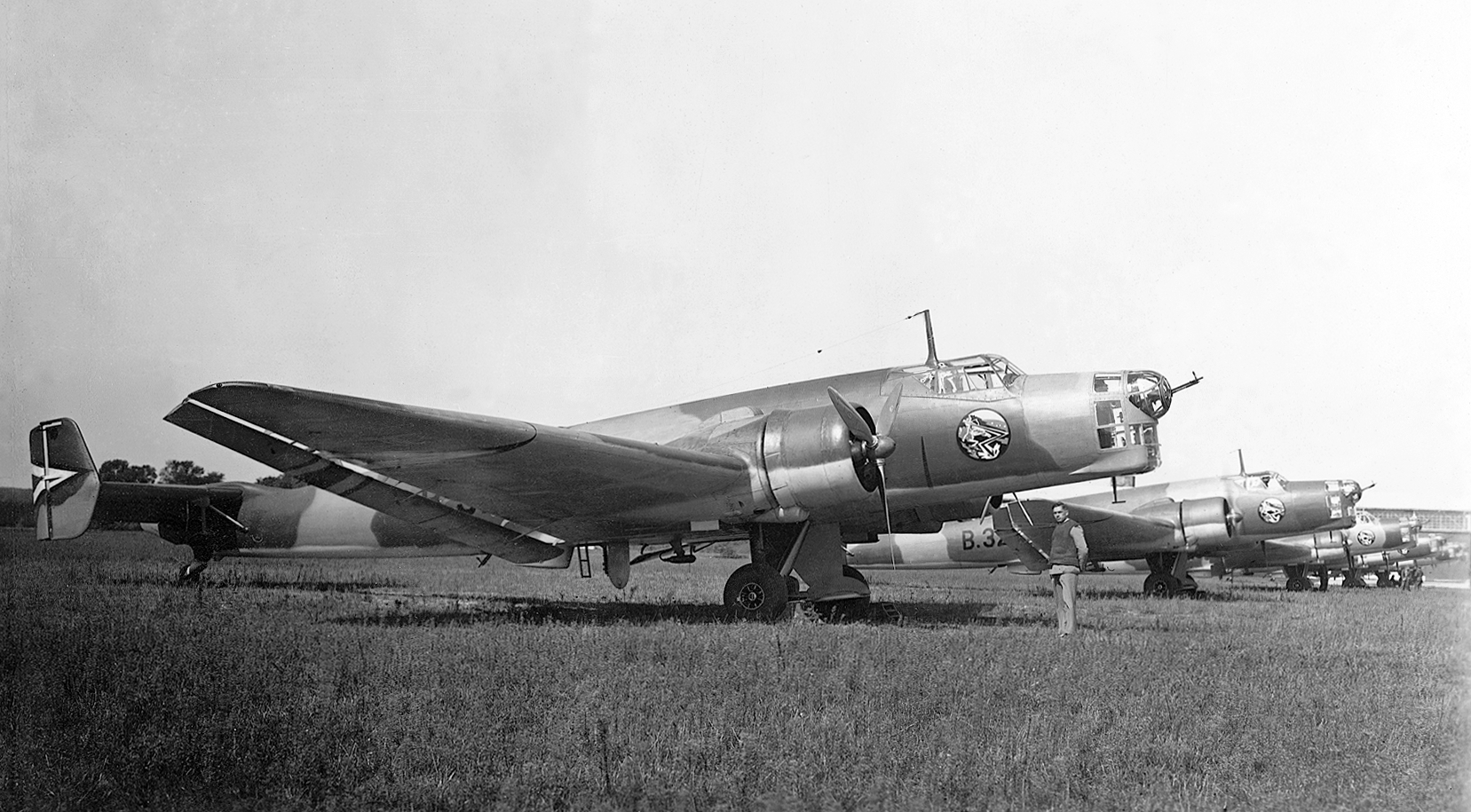
Hungarian Ju 86K-2

Ju 86K-2
Export version for Hungary.
Ju 86K-4
Export version for Sweden, similar to the Ju 86K-1, but fitted with two Bristol Pegasus III radials.
Ju 86K-5
Swedish-built bomber aircraft, powered by two Swedish-built Bristol Pegasus XII radials.
Ju 86K-6
Export version for Chile
Ju 86K-7
Export version for Austria and Portugal (Note: According to a source, the ten aircraft received by Portugal were the K-7 version) with BMW 132 radials.
Ju 86K-13
Swedish-built bomber aircraft, fitted with Swedish or Polish-built Pegasus engines.
Ju 86P-1
High-altitude bomber version, fitted with two Jumo 207 diesel engines and with turbochargers.
Ju 86P-2
High-altitude photo reconnaissance version, still equipped for bombing. Same engines as P-1.
Ju 86R-1
High-altitude photo reconnaissance version. Retained Jumo 207 engines.
Ju 86R-2
High-altitude bomber version.
Ju 86R-3
Powered by two Jumo 208 engines.
Ju 86Z series
Civil export models

=== Proposals ===
Ju 186
Proposed four-engined high-altitude bomber aircraft. Not built.
Ju 286
Proposed six-engined high-altitude bomber aircraft. Not built.
K 85
Proposed torpedo bomber version for the Swedish Air Force.

== Operators ==
=== Military operators ===
Austria

- Austrian Air Force

Bolivia

- Bolivian Air Force

Chile

- Chilean Air Force

Germany

- Luftwaffe

Hungary

- Royal Hungarian Air Force

Portugal

- Portuguese Air Force

Romania

- Romanian Air Force

South Africa

- South African Air Force: The SAAF operated 18 aircraft, 17 Ju 86Z and one Ju 86K (from South African Airways). These aircraft were operated by 12 Squadron and 16 Squadron

Spain

- Spanish Air Force

Sweden

- Swedish Air Force

=== Civil operators ===
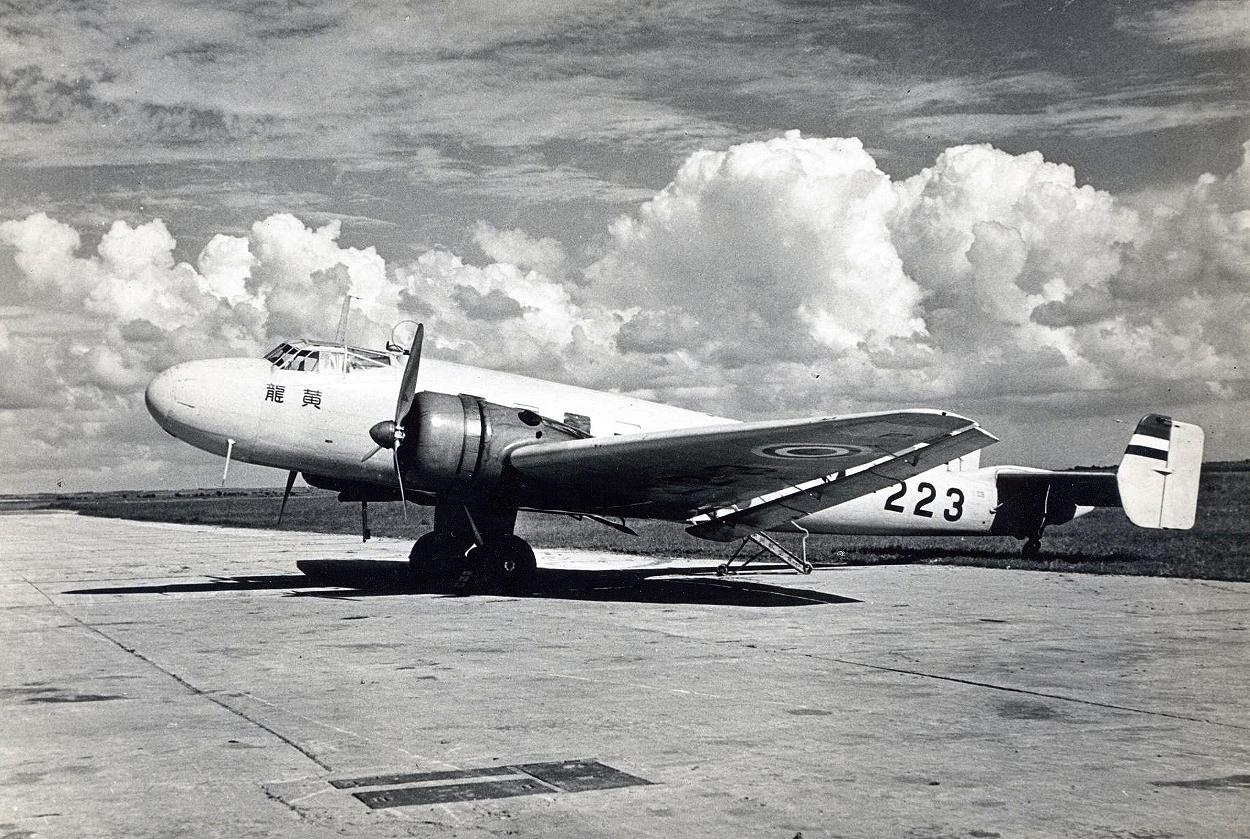
Junkers Ju 86Z, Manchukuo National Airways. M-223 "Huánglóng"

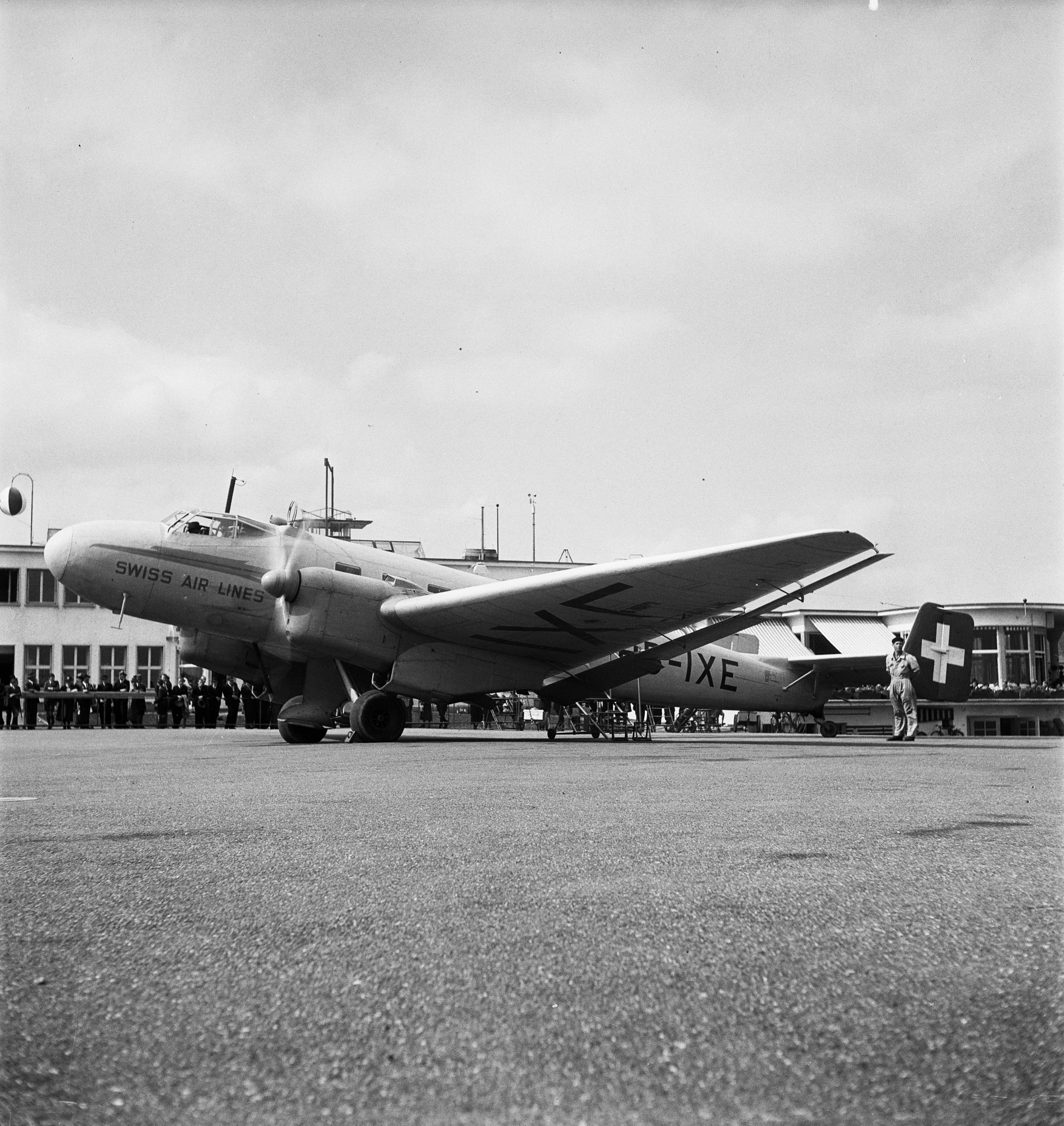
Ju 86B-1 of Swiss Air Lines

Australia

- Southern Airlines and Freighters of Australia

Bolivia

- Lloyd Aéreo Boliviano

Chile

- LAN Chile

Germany

- Deutsche Luft Hansa

Manchukuo (Manchuria)

- Manchukuo National Airways

South Africa

- South African Airways

Spanish State

- Iberia Airlines

Sweden

- AB Aerotransport

Switzerland

- Swissair

== Specifications (Ju 86R-1) ==
3-side view of the Ju 86K

Data from The warplanes of the Third Reich, Jane's Fighting Aircraft of World War II and Warbirds Resource Group

General characteristics

- Crew: two (pilot and radio operator)
- Length: 16.46 m (54 ft 0 in)
- Wingspan: 32 m (105 ft 0 in)
- Height: 4.08 m (13 ft 5 in)
- Wing area: 97.06 m^{2} (1,044.7 sq ft)
- Empty weight: 6,780 kg (14,947 lb)
- Max takeoff weight: 11,530 kg (25,419 lb)
- Fuel capacity: 1,937 L (512 US gal; 426 imp gal)
- Powerplant: 2 × Junkers Jumo 207B-3 six-cylinder liquid-cooled two-stroke opposed-piston diesel engines, 750 kW (1,000 hp) each for take-off

560 kW (750 hp) at 12,000 m (40,000 ft) with GM-1 Nitrous Oxide injection

- Propellers: 4-bladed constant-speed propellers

Performance

- Maximum speed: 420 km/h (260 mph, 230 kn) at 9,000 m (30,000 ft)

370 km/h (230 mph; 200 kn) at 9,000 m (30,000 ft)

- Cruise speed: 250 km/h (160 mph, 130 kn) at 13,700 m (44,900 ft)
- Range: 1,750 km (1,090 mi, 940 nmi)
- Endurance: seven hours and ten minutes
- Service ceiling: 14,400 m (47,200 ft)

== See also ==
- Aerial reconnaissance in World War II

Aircraft of comparable role, configuration, and era

- Heinkel He 111
- Dornier Do 17
- Fokker T.V
- Savoia-Marchetti SM.79

Related lists

- List of aircraft of World War II
- List of military aircraft of Germany
