= Blohm & Voss BV 138 =

1937 flying boat family by Blohm & Voss

BV 138B
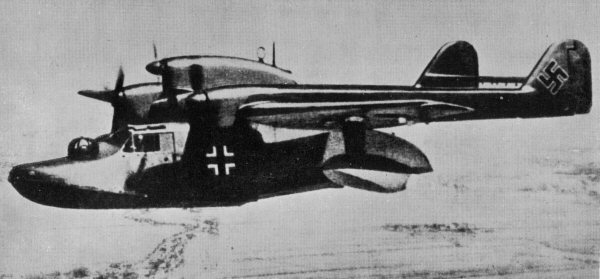
- An image of a BV 138 published in a British Aircraft guide.

General information
- Type: Maritime patrol Long-Range Reconnaissance
- Manufacturer: Blohm & Voss
- Designer: Richard Vogt
- Primary user: Luftwaffe
- Number built: 297

History
- Manufactured: 1938–1943
- Introduction date: October 1940
- First flight: 15 July 1937

The Blohm & Voss BV 138 Seedrache (Sea Dragon) was a trimotor flying boat designed and built by the German aircraft manufacturer Blohm & Voss. It served as the Luftwaffe's primary seaborne long-range maritime patrol and naval reconnaissance aircraft operated by the Luftwaffe during the Second World War.

The BV 138 was a pre-war design by Dr Richard Vogt, originally developed under the company name of Hamburger Flugzeugbau, and thus it was initially designated Ha 138 instead. It had an uncommon appearance due to its combination of unusual design features, such as its twin boom tail unit, short hull, and trimotor engine configuration. In reference to the side-view shape of its fuselage, the aircraft was often referred to via the nickname Der Fliegende Holzschuh ("Flying Clog"). Originally designed to be powered using two engines, the trimotor configuration was adopted prior to flight testing due to engine difficulties. Development would be protracted due to multiple redesigns being enacted.

Shortly after the maiden flight of the first prototype (D-ARAK) on 15 July 1937, identified instabilities necessitated a redesign of the hull and tail booms to improve both hydrodynamic and aerodynamic properties. The first production-standard aircraft, designated BV 138A-1, performed its first flight during April 1940, by which point Germany was at war with multiple neighbouring nations. By December 1940, it has been introduced as a military naval reconnaissance aircraft by the Luftwaffe. Despite concerns as to its structural strength, which was improved over time, it was adapted into various roles, including as a radar-equipped anti-shipping aircraft, an austere troop transport, and as an airborne aerial countermeasure to naval mines. The definitive BV 138C-1 was introduced to service during March 1941. A total of 297 BV 138s were built between 1938 and 1943.

== Development ==
During the early 1930s, the Blohm & Voss shipbuilding company in Hamburg was suffering financial hardship due to a prolonged downturn in orders amid the Great Depression affecting global demand; company officials opted to diversify via the creation of a new subsidiary company, Hamburger Flugzeugbau, which specialised in the design and manufacture of aircraft. The BV 138, which was originally designated as the Ha 138, originated out of the new company's interest in creating its first flying boat; the endeavour was considered a natural fit for the firm, being owned by a shipbuilding company meant that many staff already had good knowledge of the maritime environment and suitable construction practices thereof, while the company's main complex was sited on the Elbe, permitting direct access to a large body of water.

Design studies into various configuration were performed; one, referred to as P.12, was selected for further development as a long range reconnaissance aircraft. In terms of its general configuration, it had a relatively short hull, a high-mounted wing that incorporated not only a pair of engines but also floats, and twin boom tail unit. During early 1935, a mock-up of the design was completed; shortly thereafter, an initial order calling for the construction of three prototypes was placed. Originally, each of these prototypes was powered by a different pair of engines, each to be capable of providing around 1,000 hp; however, due to engine difficulties, the aircraft was redesigned into a trimotor with the new third engine being positioned above the centre of the wing. In this guise, the aircraft was powered by an arrangement of three Junkers Jumo 205 diesel engines, each capable of 650 hp.

This stage of development was protracted, in part due to the need to address the original engine difficulties with an extensive redesign. On 15 July 1937, the first prototype performed its maiden flight. It differed from subsequent aircraft in several ways, having a unique hull design. Several changes were made, particularly in the area of the vertical tail surfaces and the hull, on the second prototype after flight testing revealed both hydrodynamic and aerodynamic instability. A longer and reshaped hull was adopted along with stronger tail booms. A total of five pre-production aircraft, which were capable of carrying multiple defensive machine guns, were completed during the late 1930s.

During April 1940, the first production-standard aircraft, designated BV 138A-1, performed its first flight; shortly thereafter, it was rapidly introduced into Luftwaffe service in response to pressing wartime demands. In June 1940, quantity deliveries commenced to KüFlGr 506 and 906. In light of criticism that structural strengthening was required, the BV 138A-1 had a relatively short production run, being replaced by the BV 138B-1 towards the end of 1940. Improvements included the adoption of the more powerful Jumo 205D diesel engine and armament changes.

The strength of the structure was only fully addressed via the introduction of the improved BV 138C-1 in March 1941; this model became the definitive version of the aircraft. To address vibration-related concerns on the earlier models, the central engine of the BV 138C-1 drove a four-bladed propeller, while the other two engines were fitted with broader three-bladed counterparts; the central engine's radiator arrangement was also revised.

== Design ==
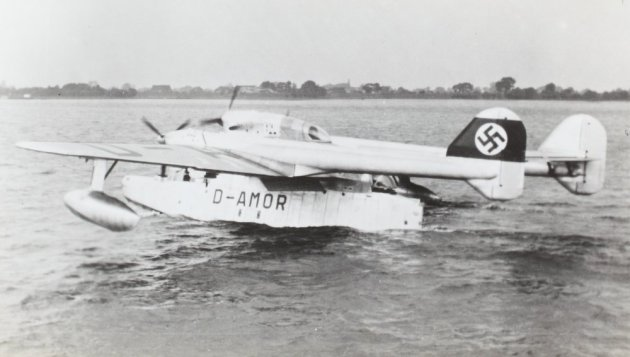
The second prototype Ha 138/BV 138 V2

The Blohm & Voss BV 138 is a military trimotor flying boat. It had a relatively compact hull which, with its hydrodynamic step beneath and flat sides, earned it the nickname, "Fliegender Holzschuh" (the flying clog). The booms of the twin tail unit, much like the smaller Focke-Wulf Fw 189 twin-engined reconnaissance monoplane, extended horizontally from the rear of the outer engine nacelles. For hydrodynamic reasons, the hull featured a distinct "turn-down", or "beak" at the stern. While the first prototype had featured a gull wing, it was quickly determined that this wing could not generate sufficient lift, so the concept was abandoned on the second prototype. The airplanes had also a hardpoint for catapult launches from seaplane tenders.

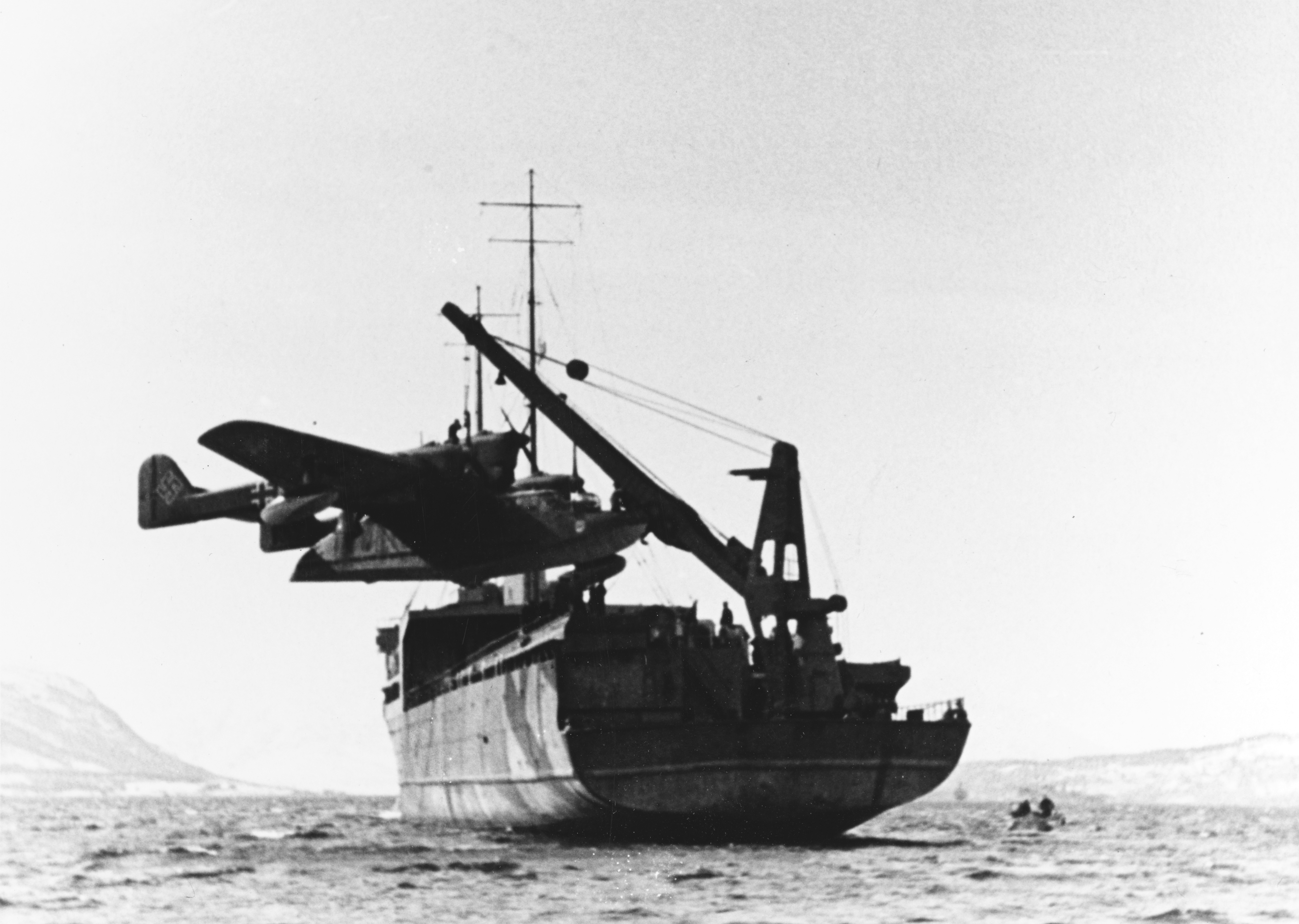
BV 138 being prepared for catapult launch on the aircraft tender Friesenland.

It was powered by a total of three piston engines. The central engine was mounted above the fuselage while the wing engines were lower. The pre-production prototypes and the BV 138A-01 to BV 138A-06, were powered by various makes of engines ranging from 485 to 746 kW (650–1,000 hp). The first standardized version, BV 138B-1, was powered by three 880 PS (868 hp, 647 kW) Junkers Jumo 205D two-stroke, opposed-piston aircraft diesel engines. The engine cowlings also had an atypical appearance. Due to the unique nature of the vertical orientation of the six-cylinder opposed-piston engines, they resembled the cowlings of 4 or 6-cylinder inverted inline engines found on smaller civil and utility aircraft. The choice for diesel engines made it possible to refuel at sea from U-boats, who also used diesel engines. When refuelling at sea, the airplane had to be fitted with a fuel filter as marine diesel fuel contained some condensation.

There were three gun positions on the aircraft, including an enclosed powered gun turret armed with a single MG 151/20 autocannon on the bow. Due to the fields of fire being obstructed by the tail, especially the horizontal stabilizer, the defensive gun positions on the stern comprised one gun position low on the fuselage and a second one higher up, just aft of the central engine. The gun position behind the central engine, which could see over the horizontal stabilizer, was a fully open Scarff ring-like emplacement which originally mounted a 7.92 mm MG 15 machine gun, although most aircraft had a 13 mm MG 131 heavy machine gun. The lower gun position at the rear fuselage fired below the horizontal stabilizer. It too was left open and equipped with a machine gun on early aircraft, however, most later-built aircraft mounted an enclosed powered turret similar to the one on the bow.

Many German aircraft had Umbau sets available for modifications in the field. For the BV 138 there was an Umrüst-Bausatz (factory conversion kits) set for adding an additional bomb rack, which could doubled the bomb payload. As per German nomenclature, such aircraft held a suffix '/U1'. A BV 138 C-1 aircraft with the Umbau modification would become BV 138 C-1/U1.

== Operational history ==
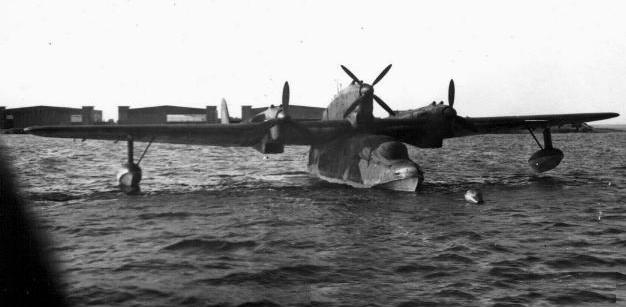
Blohm & Voss BV 138 at anchor on Lake Siutghiol, near Constanta, Romania in 1943.

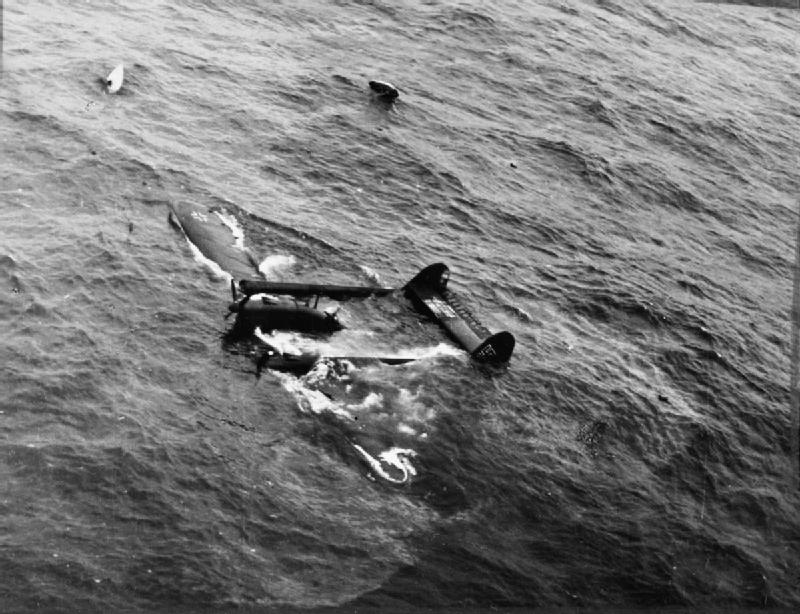
A Bv 138 flying boat shot down by a Bristol Beaufighter of No. 404 Squadron RCAF near the northern coast of Scotland, 1943.

During the invasion of Norway in April 1940, two of the pre-production aircraft were pressed into service as troop transports. By December of that year, the BV 138 had been declared operational in the long-range reconnaissance role. The first unit to be equipped with the type being based in Western France. In addition to its use in the maritime reconnaissance role, several aircraft were specially adapted to sweep naval mines; designated BV 138MS, this role necessitated the deletion of all conventional armaments and the installation of a large (roughly 40 feet (12 m) diameter) dural hoop mounted horizontally under the wings, powered by an auxiliary motor generating an electric field which detonated magnetic mines. Early built aircraft often had issues related to insufficient structural strength.

In March 1941, the most successful variant of the aircraft, designated BV 138C-1, entered Luftwaffe service. For naval reconnaissance, some aircraft carried FuG 200 Hohentwiel low-UHF band maritime search radar sets; this enabled the type to be effectively used to conduct anti-shipping missions. Dependent upon the mission role and equipment fitted, the crew could comprise as many as six personnel.

Some BV 138s served with the specialist KG200, where they would often carry up to 10 fully armed infantry troops in place of a bombload.

In preparation of a repeat of Operation Wunderland in 1943, the U-boat U-255 was sent to the East coast of Novaja Zemlya where it teamed up with a BV 138. The U-255 refuelled the BV 138 four times for reconnaissance flights over the Kara Sea, up to the Vilkitsky Strait. The BV 138 could not find any shipping however, that would make a mission for the German cruiser Lützow worthwhile, so the operation was cancelled.

The BV 138 was tested with the Walter HWK 109-500 Starthilfe RATO jettisonable rocket pod, used in pairs, for shorter takeoff performance. All rocket units were jettisoned after use; fitted with parachutes, they could be recovered after landing.

== Variants ==
Ha 138 V1 (D-ARAK)

First prototype, developed under Hamburger Flugzeugbau designation. First flight on 15 July 1937.

Ha 138 V2 (D-AMOR)

Second prototype, developed under Hamburger Flugzeugbau designation. First flight in August 1937.

Ha 138 V3

Third prototype, developed under Hamburger Flugzeugbau designation. Construction abandoned due to redesign.

BV 138 A-01 to 06

Pre-production operational test beds; six built. First flew February 1939

BV 138 A-1

First serial production, 25 built. Standard engine is the 605 PS Junkers Jumo 205 C.

BV 138 B-0

Pre-production operational test beds, in service by October 1940; 10 built.

BV 138 B-1

Entered service in November 1940; 21 built. Engines are upgraded to 880 PS (868 hp, 647 kW) Junkers Jumo 205D two-stroke, opposed-piston aircraft diesel engines.

BV 138 C-1

From this version on, the central motor was fitted with a four-blade propeller, while the wing engines kept a three-blade propeller, but the blades were reinforced and wider; 227 built.

BV 138 MS

Minesweeping version; (Note: The "MS" suffix of the BV 138 MS signified Minensuch (literally "mine search")) all MS variants were converted from existing aircraft and had their armament removed; the turrets and gun positions were covered. They carried magnetic field-generating degaussing equipment, which included a hoop antenna with a diameter equal to the length of the fuselage, which encircled the hull and wings

== Surviving aircraft ==
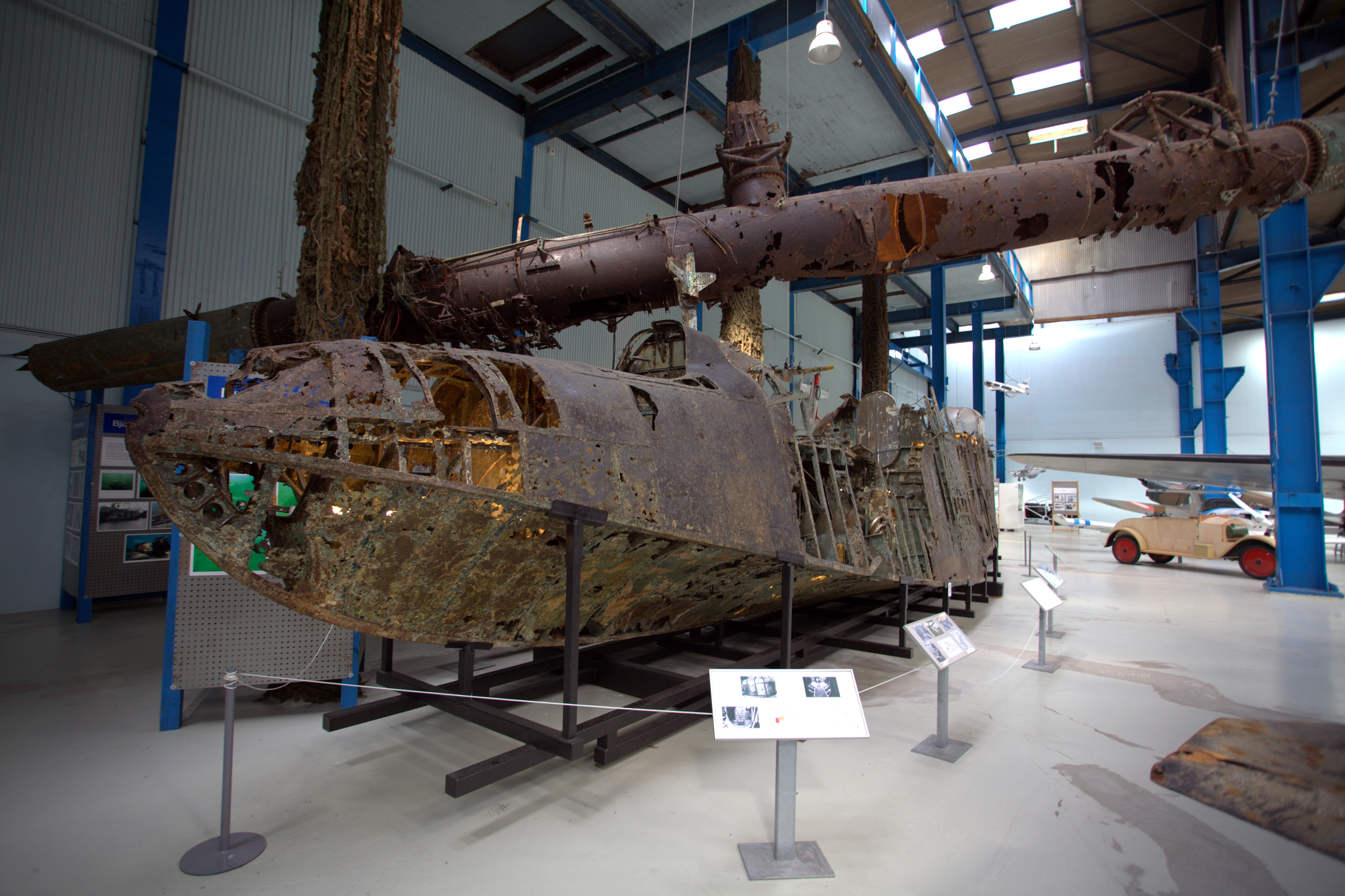
The wreck of NJ+HE a Blohm & Voss BV 138 displayed at the Danish Technical Museum in Elsinore. (Note: The wing spar is poised over the aircraft in the same position as it was, when the wreck was discovered in The Sound, off Copenhagen)

No complete BV 138s remain in existence. However, the wreck of one aircraft, sunk after the war in a British air show, was raised from the seabed of the Øresund Sound in 2000, and is on display at the Danish Technical Museum in Helsingør.

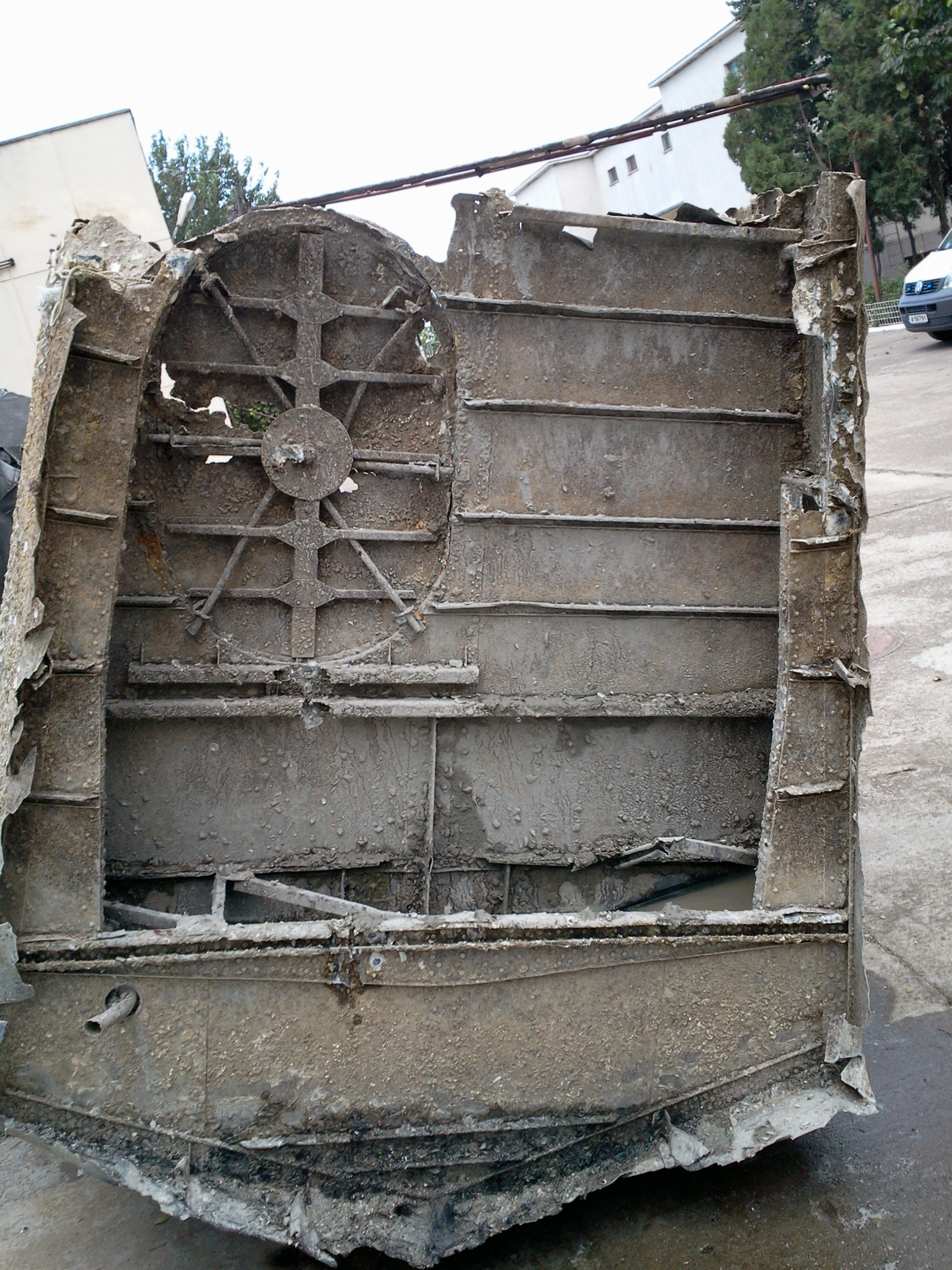
Parts of the BV 138 wreck discovered in Romania

In 2012, the wreck of a BV 138 was discovered in Lake Siutghiol at a depth of 5 m by two divers, and initially thought to be a Savoia-Marchetti S.55. The wreck, together with that of a He 114 also discovered there, were recovered by Romanian Navy divers in October of the same year. The wrecks are stored at the National Museum of the Romanian Navy in Constanța.

In June 2013, a vessel from the Norwegian Geological Survey filmed a Blohm & Voss BV 138 at a depth of 35 m in Porsangerfjorden, Norway, not far from the WWII German seaplane harbour in Indre Billefjord.

Another wreckage of a BV 138 was identified by the Norwegian Mapping and Cadastre Authority on the seabed near Svalbard in 2022.

== Specifications (BV 138C-1) ==

Data from Aircraft of the Third Reich : Volume One

General characteristics

- Crew: Six (pilot, navigator, radio operator, nose-gunner, rear-gunner, upper-rear gunner)
- Capacity: up to 10 passengers
- Length: 19.85 m (65 ft 1 in)
- Wingspan: 26.94 m (88 ft 5 in)
- Height: 5.9 m (19 ft 4 in)
- Wing area: 112 m^{2} (1,210 sq ft)
- Empty weight: 11,770 kg (25,948 lb)
- Gross weight: 14,500 kg (31,967 lb)
- Max takeoff weight: 17,650 kg (38,912 lb)
- Fuel capacity: 3,750 L (990 US gal; 820 imp gal) maximum internal fuel
- Powerplant: 3 × Junkers Jumo 205D Six-cylinder liquid-cooled opposed piston diesel engines, 647 kW (868 hp) each for take-off
- Propellers: 3-bladed constant-speed propellers

Performance

- Maximum speed: 285 km/h (177 mph, 154 kn) at sea level at 14,000 kg (31,000 lb) at sea level
- Cruise speed: 235 km/h (146 mph, 127 kn) at 1,000 m (3,300 ft)
- Range: 1,220 km (760 mi, 660 nmi) at 195 km/h (121 mph; 105 kn)
- Ferry range: 4,300 km (2,700 mi, 2,300 nmi) with max fuel
- Endurance: Five hours and 30 minutes (standard configuration); 18 hours (ferry configuration)
- Service ceiling: 5,000 m (16,000 ft) at 14,500 kg (32,000 lb)

2,800 m (9,200 ft) at 17,650 kg (38,910 lb)

- Rate of climb: 3.67 m/s (722 ft/min)
- Time to altitude: 3,170 m (10,400 ft) in 24 minutes
- Wing loading: 114.2 kg/m^{2} (23.4 lb/sq ft)
- Power/mass: 0.106 kW/kg (0.064 hp/lb)

Armament

- Guns:

- 2 × 20 mm (0.79 in) MG 151/20 cannon, one in a nose turret and one in the rear fuselage covering upper rear area
- 1 × 13 mm (0.51 in) MG 131 machine gun in open position behind the central engine, covering the top rear area
- 1 × 7.92 mm (0.31 in) MG 15 machine guns in the starboard side, used by the radio operator (optional)

- Bombs: Mounted under starboard wing root, up to:

- 3 × 50 kg (110 lb) bombs
- 3 × 70 kg (154 lb) SD 70 bombs
- 2 × 150 kg (331 lb) Fl WB 150 depth charges

(With the Umbau modification, the payload could be doubled.)

Avionics

- FuG 200 Hohentwiel (optional)

== See also ==
Aircraft of comparable role, configuration, and era

- CANT Z.506
- Consolidated PBY Catalina
- Dornier Do 18
- Kawanishi H6K
- Short Sunderland

Related lists

- List of aircraft of World War II
- List of military aircraft of Germany
