= Charomskiy M-40 =

Soviet turbocharged aircraft diesel engine developed during World War II

- Type: Liquid-cooled V-12 turbocharged diesel engine
- National origin: Soviet Union
- Manufacturer: Charomskiy
- First run: c. 1940
- Major applications: Petlyakov Pe-8
- Manufactured: 1940–41
- Number built: 120

The Charomskiy M-40 was a Soviet turbocharged aircraft diesel engine developed during World War II. It was used in a few Petlyakov Pe-8 heavy bombers until August 1941 when it was removed, because it was unreliable at high altitudes. The engines were stored until 1944 when they were disassembled and their components were used in the closely related Charomskiy ACh-30B.

== Development ==
Much like the Charomskiy ACh-30, the M-40 was a development of the experimental AN-1RTK turbo-supercharged diesel engine that had begun development in the early 1930s. It dropped its predecessor's supercharger, but added another two E-88 turbochargers and two intercoolers. It failed its State acceptance testing in May 1940, but production began regardless at the Kirov factory in Leningrad which built 58 engines in the first half of 1941. Production ceased in the Fall after a total of 120 engines were finished.

Delivery problems with the Mikulin AM-34FRNV forced the termination of the production of the Petlyakov Pe-8 for lack of suitable engines in 1940, but the M-40 was adapted for use on the Pe-8 in the spring of 1941. However the M-40 tended to "cut out at high altitude because the manually controlled fuel feed depended on a certain engine speed being maintained and it could only be restarted at about 1,500 metres (4,900 ft)". In August 1941 the M-40s were removed from the few Pe-8s that had received them and placed into storage. In 1944 Factory No. 500 began to disassemble them in order to use their components in the closely related Charomskiy ACh-30B engine.

A boosted version, the M-40F, was tested in the summer of 1940 and was approved for production the following November, although only a small batch was built in 1941. It was evaluated in a Yermolaev Yer-2 during 1941, but not accepted for use.

== Variants ==
- M-40 — main production version
- M-40F — boosted version, Power: 1,500 hp (1,100 kW), Weight: 1,200 kg (2,600 lb)

== Applications ==
- Petlyakov Pe-8
- KV-4 Heavy Tank design proposals

== Specifications ==
Data from Kotelnikov, Russian Piston Aero Engines

=== General characteristics ===
- Type: V-12, turbocharged, four-stroke, diesel engine
- Bore: 180 mm (7.1 in)
- Stroke: 200 mm (7.9 in)
- Displacement: 61.04 L (3,725 cu in)
- Dry weight: 1,150 kg (2,540 lb)

=== Components ===
- Turbocharger: 4 x E-88
- Fuel type: diesel
- Cooling system: liquid-cooled

=== Performance ===
- Power output: 1,250 hp (930 kW)
- Compression ratio: 13.5:1

== See also ==
Related development

- Charomskiy ACh-30

Comparable engines

- Junkers Jumo 204
- Junkers Jumo 205

Related lists

- List of aircraft engines
