= Blohm & Voss BV 222 Wiking =

1940 flying boat family by Blohm & Voss

BV 222 Wiking
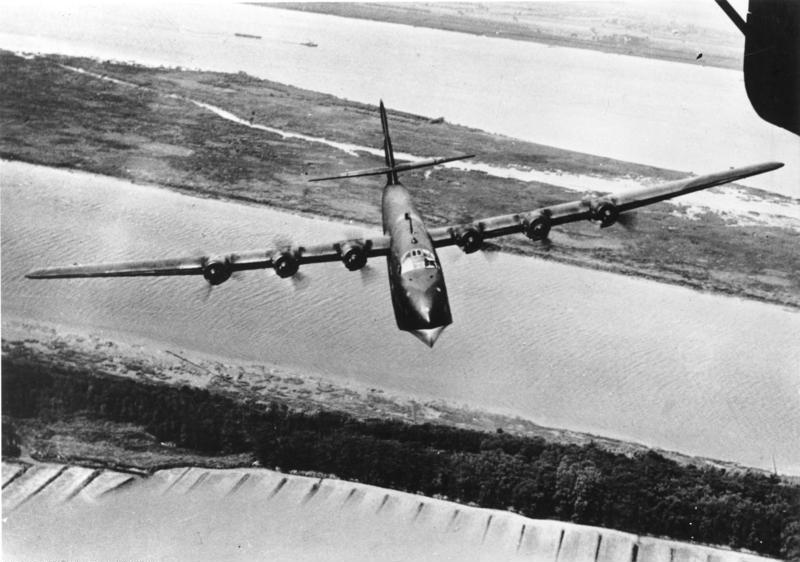
- The BV 222 Wiking in flight

General information
- Type: Passenger, cargo or air ambulance Flying boat
- Manufacturer: Blohm & Voss
- Primary user: Luftwaffe
- Number built: 13

History
- Introduction date: 1941
- First flight: 7 September 1940
- Retired: 1947

The Blohm & Voss BV 222 Wiking (pronounced "Veeking") was a large six-engined German monoplane flying boat designed and built by the German aircraft manufacturer Blohm & Voss. It was the largest Axis flying boat to enter production and operation during the Second World War.

The BV 222 was developed during the late 1930s as a commercial transport for the transatlantic and other long distance routes of the German flag carrier Luft Hansa. By the time it first flew on 7 September 1940, Nazi Germany had already started the Second World War, ending most long distance civil services, and development focussed on military roles. In July 1941, V1 undertook its first cargo transport mission with the Luftwaffe and further logistics flights followed, and by the end of that year, BV 222s were being armed. Deliveries of production aircraft, designated BV 222C, took until 1943 to begin.

The BV 222 was operated by the Luftwaffe, initially for transport, across numerous theatres, including Norway, France, North Africa and even the Arctic. At one point, Nazi officials were considering using the BV 222 for a long distance air route between Germany and Japan, flying from Kirkenes in Norway to Tokyo via Sakhalin Island, a distance of 6,400 km (4,000 mi). After the Allied Invasion of Normandy in June 1944, surviving BV 222s were transferred to KG 200. Several BV 222s were captured and tested by both the United States and Britain. None have been preserved.

== Development ==
During the interwar period, the German flag carrier Deutsche Luft Hansa had built up an extensive network of long range airmail routes, including transatlantic routes. During the mid 1930s, the airline continued to hold a strong interest in the further development of its long distance routes and accordingly, Luft Hansa formulated a requirement for a new large flying boat to serve on its transatlantic routes. Specifics of this requirement included sufficient space to accommodate a minimum of 24 passengers. In response, the German aircraft manufacturer Hamburger Flugzeugbau designed a new larger flying boat, which was initially designated the Ha 222. The design team was headed by Dr. Richard Vogt.

The company, which had changed its name to that of its parent company, Blohm & Voss, received an initial order from Luft Hansa for three aircraft under the designation of BV 222 during September 1939. Blohm & Voss had been so confident that it had already made plans to commence production in January 1938, and start work on two more later that year.

On 7 September 1940, the first aircraft, designated V1, performed its first flight, with the civil registration D-ANTE. By this point, the Second World War had been underway for almost a year and Luft Hansa saw no prospect of operating a transatlantic route, thus the airline had no immediate role for the BV 222 to fill. The flight test programme was then adjusted to investigate the type's potential for military applications and various minor modifications, such as the addition of larger loading doors, were made.

Initial trials found that the BV 222 had stiff flight controls and that its hydrodynamic qualities could be improved. The former issue was largely attributed to friction and thus was soon resolved. Those same trials also demonstrated that the aircraft was capable of carrying up to 92 passengers, or 72 stretcher patients, over a short distance at a maximum speed of 385 km/h (239 mph). The flight characteristics were determined to be satisfactory, although some improvements were required. Trials of the aircraft continued until December 1940, at which point the V1 was transferred to the Luftwaffe. It was camouflaged and given the Stammkennzeichen military aircraft registration code of CC+EQ, which was later changed to the Geschwaderkennung "wing code" designation X4+AH, when in service with Lufttransportgruppe (See) 222.

Prototypes were identified as V1 to V8. Production examples were designated C-09 to C-13. Up to two BV 222s could be assembled at a time at the company's Steinwerder works outside Hamburg and each complete aircraft took an average of 350,000 work hours to complete. At the height of production, personnel worked night and day, permitting a hull to be completed within as little as six weeks.

== Design ==
The Blohm & Voss BV 222 was a large six-engined flying boat. The interior volume of the hull was spacious due to there being no bulkheads above the stepped cabin floor. Below the floor there were closely spaced bulkheads instead. There were no heavy structural elements needed to carry stresses between the base of the hull and the wings. Access to the bilge was achieved via hatches. The hull planing bottom used an unfaired lateral main step. A further five much smaller steps were present on the planing bottom immediately aft of the main step, while the rear of the keel terminated in a tall knife-edge mid way along the rear fuselage. To prevent the corrosion experienced with the first prototype, a specially developed paint was applied to most BV 222s. Unlike with most flying boats, a high-quality finish was not deemed necessary.

Typical for flying boats, the BV 222 used wingtip balance floats however these retracted into recesses on the wing underside and consisted of pairs of retracting float on each side, which came together when extended to join into a single float. Flutes were later added to sides of the floats to improve their hydrodynamic properties. The wing was built around a large welded tubular steel wing spar which supported the engines. The spar was of a constant diameter to just outboard of the engines, then was tapered to the wing tips. Fuel and oil were housed in tanks within the wing spar. The outer wing structure had to be strengthened.

The majority of the flight control surfaces, save for segments of the elevators that were power-augmented, were manually operated by the pilot. On production aircraft, torsion tubes, gears and quadrants were used to actuate control surfaces. The ailerons were divided into two sections, with the inner pair fitted with servo tabs. Under normal conditions, the inner and outer aileron sections would move and work independently, however, the inner sections would be picked up by stops on the outer sections in situations where they became ineffective, such as during low speed flight or taxiing downwind. The elevator was split into three sections, the outer one being used only for trimming, while the middle section was directly controlled by the pilot, and the centre section was controlled by an autopilot which reduced operator fatigue on long flights, but was switched off for landing and takeoff. Instead of a trio of trimming wheels, a tab box was used which was praised by pilots.

The BV 222 was originally powered by six Bramo 323 Fafnir radial engines. Later built aircraft were powered by six 746 kW (1,000 hp) Jumo 207C inline two-stroke opposed-piston diesel engines instead. The use of diesel fuel permitted refueling at sea by special re-supply U-boats. One aircraft was fitted with Jumo 205C and later Jumo 205D engines.

== Operational history ==
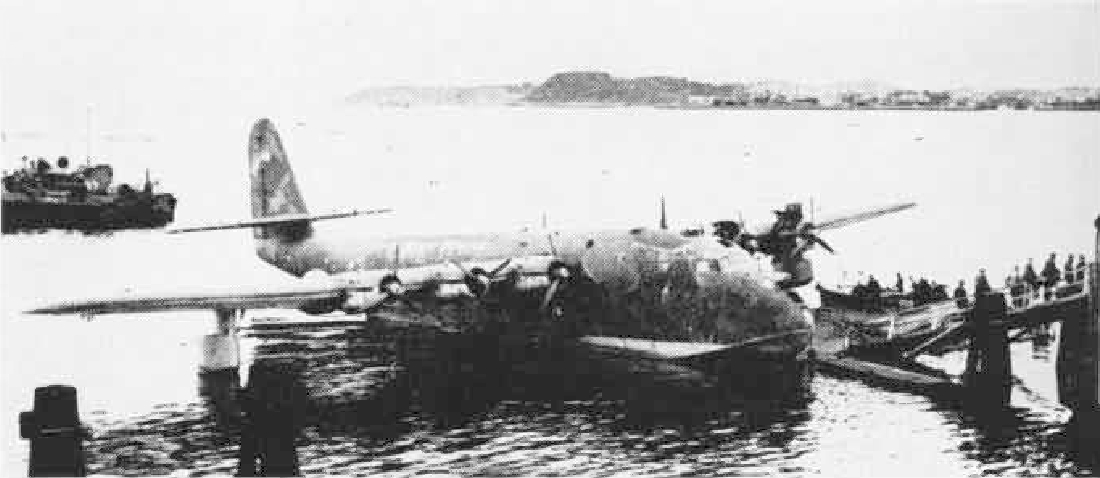
A captured BV 222 at Trondheim, Norway, after the war

On 10 July 1941, V1 undertook its first cargo mission for the Luftwaffe. By 19 August 1941, V1 had made seven flights between Hamburg (Germany) and Kirkenes (Norway), transporting 65,000 kg (143,000 lb) of supplies and 221 wounded men, covering a distance of 30,000 km (19,000 mi). After an overhaul at Hamburg, V1 was sent to Athens, Greece, from where it carried supplies for the Afrika Korps, making 17 flights between 16 October and 6 November 1941. At this time, V1 was unarmed, but was escorted by a pair of Messerschmitt Bf 110 heavy fighters.

Following these flights, V1 returned to Hamburg to be armed, with one 7.92 mm (0.312 in) MG 81 machine gun in the hull four in waist mounts, and two turret-mounted 13 mm (0.51 in) MG 131 machine guns. The registration was changed to X4+AH at the same time and V1 formed the basis for the new air transport squadron Lufttransportstaffel 222 (LTS 222). Between 1942 and 1943, the aircraft flew in the Mediterranean, until it collided with a submerged wreck and sank while landing at Piraeus harbour in February 1943.

On 7 August 1941, V2 (CC+ER) made its first flight and following a period of extensive testing, was assigned to LTS 222 on 10 August 1942 as X4+AB. In addition to the armament fitted to V1, it received two rear-facing wing-mounted turrets with dual 13 mm (0.51 in) MG 131s, which were accessed via the tubular wing spar. Wing-mounted turrets were not used on most BV 222s as they strongly degraded the aerodynamics.

Following the German invasion of the Soviet Union in June 1941, plans were made to connect Germany and Japan by air using Luftwaffe aircraft modified for very long range flights since commercial flights by Deutsche Luft Hansa were no longer possible, and it was dangerous for ships or U-boats to make the trip by sea. Field Marshal Erhard Milch had the feasibility of such direct flights studied, and several routes were considered, including departing from German-occupied Russia and Bulgaria, and a sea route using a BV 222 flying from Kirkenes in north Norway to Tokyo via Sakhalin Island, a distance of 6,400 km (4,000 mi). The BV 222 was one of three aircraft seriously considered for the program, along with the Focke-Wulf Fw 200 and the Heinkel He 177. The He 177 was ruled out due to its engines being unreliable and in 1943 the Junkers Ju 290 was selected for the flights.

V3 (initially DM+SD) first flew in November 1941 and was transferred to LTS 222 in December 1941. After V1's sinking, V3 returned to Hamburg where it was armed. It was destroyed along with V5 on 20 June 1943 at Biscarrosse by RAF de Havilland Mosquitos of No. 264 Squadron.

V4, which had an enlarged horizontal tail, was also assigned to LTS 222 for Africa flights. V6 was shot down on 21 August 1942 on the Taranto (Italy) to Tripoli (Libya) route by a Bristol Beaufighter and V8 was lost on the same route on 10 December 1942.

By late 1942, German officials had a growing interest in using the BV 222 as a long range maritime patrol aircraft rather than as a transport. Accordingly, refits commonly saw the addition of the FuG 200 Hohentwiel search radar, rear warning systems, and armament changes. Somewhat related to these changes was V7 (TB+QL), which made its first flight on 1 April 1943. In addition to those changes, V7 was fitted with six 746 kW (1,000 hp) Jumo 207C inline two-stroke diesel engines. With a takeoff weight of 50,000 kg (110,000 lb) and a range of 6,100 km (3,800 mi). it was intended as the prototype BV 222C.

One BV 222, V4, is reported to have shot down a US Navy Consolidated PB4Y-1 Liberator of VB-105 (BU#63917) on 22 October 1943. This incident has often been mistakenly construed as a BV 222 shooting down an Avro Lancaster.

A BV 222, believed to have been C-10, was reportedly shot down southwest of Biscarrosse on the night of 8 February 1944 by an RAF Mosquito of No. 157 Squadron.

In July 1944, V2 participated in Operation Schatzgräber ("Treasure Seeker"), the code name of a German weather station at Alexandra Land, a Soviet Arctic island. The station's crew were evacuated due to illness and the BV 222 also transported a spare wheel for a Fw 200 that had sustained damage during a landing near the station.

Following the Invasion of Normandy in June 1944, the remaining BV 222s were transferred to KG 200. Of these, C-09 was probably the BV 222 reported to have been strafed and destroyed by RCAF Hawker Typhoons of No. 439 Squadron on 24 April 1945 at Seedorf. V7 and V4 were scuttled by their crews at the end of the conflict.

=== Postwar ===
Three BV 222s were captured and then operated by Allied forces: C-011, C-012 and C-013. C-012, which was captured at Sørreisa in Norway after the end of the conflict along with V2, was flown by Captain Eric "Winkle" Brown from Norway to the RAF station at Calshot in 1946. It was assigned the RAF serial number "VP501". After it was tested by the Marine Aircraft Experimental Establishment at Felixstowe, it was operated by No. 201 Squadron until 1947, when it was scrapped.

C-011 and C-013 were captured by US forces. On 15 August and again on 20 August 1945, a US Navy pilot performed test flights in one of them, accompanied by a German flight crew. During two flights with a combined flight time of 38 minutes, four engine fires occurred. Spares were plentiful but of exceptionally poor quality. Not deemed airworthy, it was sunk by a US Navy destroyer. Other reports claim another US-captured aircraft was shipped to the US and may have been flown. Its fate is unknown.

V2 briefly wore US markings in 1946 but retained identification markings from the original V5 aircraft for Operation Schatzgräber. V2 was scuttled by the British who filled it with scrap to weigh it down. V2 is on the seabed in Trondheimsfjord between Ilsvika and Munkholmen in 318 m (1,043 ft) of water, and seemed to be well preserved due to low oxygen levels in the water. There were plans to raise and restore it. However, it was videotaped in 2023 by Blueye Robotics, showing that there is now severe deterioration, and coral is growing on the wreck. Historian Knut Sivertsen, advisor at Justismuseet in Trondheim, stated in 2023 that it is probably too big to salvage, and there are no plans to do so.

== Variants ==
- BV 222A – Prototype and development aircraft, comprising V1 through V8. Most were powered by six Bramo 323 Fafnir radial engines and differed individually in equipment, armament, and configuration.
- BV 222B – Proposed version powered by six 1,100 kW (1,470 hp) Junkers Jumo 208 diesel engines; not built.
- BV 222C – Diesel-powered production version developed from V7, which was fitted with six 750 kW (1,000 hp) Jumo 207C opposed-piston engines and served as the prototype for the variant. Production aircraft were designated C-09 through C-13.
- BV 222D – Proposed production version powered by six Jumo 205D diesel engines. C-13 was intended to become the first aircraft of the version, but the planned production series was abandoned.
- BV 222E – Proposed military transport version powered by six Bramo 323 Fafnir radial engines, developed after the abandonment of the diesel-powered BV 222D; not built.

== Specifications (BV 222C-09) ==
Data from Aircraft of the Third Reich and War Planes of the Second World War : Volume Five

General characteristics

- Crew: 11-14
- Capacity: 92 troops or 72 wounded on stretchers
- Length: 37 m (121 ft 5 in)
- Wingspan: 46 m (150 ft 11 in)
- Height: 10.9 m (35 ft 9 in)
- Wing area: 255 m^{2} (2,740 sq ft)
- Empty weight: 30,650 kg (67,572 lb)
- Gross weight: 45,990 kg (101,391 lb)
- Max takeoff weight: 49,000 kg (108,027 lb)
- Powerplant: 6 × Junkers Jumo 207C six-cylinder liquid-cooled opposed piston 2-stroke diesel engines, 745 kW (1,000 hp) each for take-off
- Propellers: 3-bladed variable pitch tractor propellers

Performance

- Maximum speed: 330 km/h (210 mph, 180 kn) at 46,000 kg (101,000 lb) at sea level

390 km/h (240 mph) at 5,000 m (16,000 ft)

- Cruise speed: 300 km/h (190 mph, 160 kn) continuous economical at sea level

344 km/h (214 mph) at 5,550 m (18,210 ft)

- Ferry range: 6,100 km (3,800 mi, 3,300 nmi)
- Endurance: 28 hours at 245 km/h (152 mph) at sea level
- Service ceiling: 7,300 m (24,000 ft)
- Rate of climb: 2.4 m/s (470 ft/min)
- Time to altitude: 6,000 m (20,000 ft) in 52 minutes

Armament

- Guns: ** 3 × 20 mm (0.787 in) MG 151/20 cannon (one each in fwd turret and two wing turrets).
  - 5 × 13 mm (0.51 in) MG 131 machine guns (one in nose and four in beam positions)

== See also ==
Aircraft of comparable role, configuration, and era

- Blohm & Voss BV 238
- Consolidated PB2Y Coronado
- Kawanishi H8K
- Latécoère 631
- Martin JRM Mars
- Short Shetland

Related lists

- List of military aircraft of Germany
- List of seaplanes and flying boats
