= Georg Hartmann (geographer) =

Georg Hartmann (4 August 1865 – 12 July 1946) was a German geographer working in German South West Africa.

He was born in Dresden and educated at the technical school of his native city and at Leipzig, where he studied mathematics, physics, and geography (doctorate 1889). From 1893 to 1908 he traveled throughout German South West Africa and southern Angola. He worked as a director for the Otavi Mining and Railway Company and was co-founder of the town Grootfontein in Otjozondjupa Region, Namibia.

In 1908 he returned to Germany, settling in the village of Rathstock, near Alt Tucheband. He gave lectures, and authored papers on history, colonial politics and sociology.

Hartmann's mountain zebra (Equus zebra hartmannae Matschie, 1898) is named in his honor. It is a subspecies of the mountain zebra native to south-western Angola, Namibia and South Africa. Hartmann Valley in the Kaokoveld is also named after him.

Hartmann died at Grammersdorf in Schleswig-Holstein.

== Selected works ==
- Der einfluss des treibeises auf die bodengestalt der polargebiete, 1891 – The influence of drift ice on land formation in polar regions.
- Meine Expedition 1900 ins nördliche Kaokofeld und 1901 durch das Amboland, 1903 – My expedition in 1900 to the northern Kaokoveld and in 1901 to Ovamboland.
