= Kampfgruppe 1001 Nights =

Kampfgruppe 1001 Nights (German: 1001 Nacht) was a German Kampfgruppe formed on the Oder front during the final German offensive of the Second World War, taking part in the failed attack on Genschmar on 27 March 1945.

== History ==
Kampfgruppe 1001 Nights was formed from the guards at the V-2 launch sites in March 1945.

Three companies of V-2 guards arrived at the German Ninth Army HQ on the Oder river in early March, 1945. Simultaneously, three companies of Hetzer panzerjäger from the 560th SS Tank Destroyer Battalion, which had been used for training purposes, were sent to join Army Group Vistula on the Oder front. General Theodor Busse, Ninth Army's commander, decided to form these troops into a Kampfgruppe which could be used as a mobile reserve.

Major Gustav-Adolf Blancbois was placed in command. Soon after its formation, a motorcycle company and several anti-tank guns, armoured cars and a company of StuG III assault guns from the 27th SS Volunteer Division Langemarck were added to the Kampfgruppe. The Kampfgruppe's strength was about 500 infantry and 43 serviceable armoured vehicles.

The Kampfgruppe was divided into three combat formations, named Suleika, Harem and Sultan. Suleika was commanded by Sturmbannführer Wost and later by Haupsturmführer Markowz with a staff, a supply company, three Jagdpanzer-Kompanien with 14 Hetzer each and a fourth with Sturmgeschütze and back up recovery tanks.

On 27 March, the Kampfgruppe was ordered into action near the town of Genschmar, in an attempt to reduce the Red Army's bridgehead over the Oder, which it failed to do.

On 16 April, the battle of Seelow Heights began as the Red Army attacked the German defensive lines on the Oder. The Kampfgruppe was sent with the 25th Panzergrenadier Division and the 111th StuG-Lehr Brigade to support the 606th Infantry Division near the town of Wriezen. The Germans were driven back, with the Kampfgruppe reduced to 18 functioning armoured vehicles and 50 men.

The Kampfgruppe was dissolved near Müncheberg during the withdrawal to Berlin. Its remnants were encircled and destroyed in the Halbe pocket; few of its men survived the war. One exception was Blancbois himself, who, along with a small number of his men, escaped to the west and surrendered to the Americans on the Elbe.

== Commander ==
- Oberstleutnant Gustav-Adolf Blancbois

== Order of battle ==
- Kampfgruppe HQ
- Element Suleika - 560th SS Tank Destroyer Battalion (SS-Sturmbannführer Wöst)
  - 3 x companies of Hetzer panzerjägers
  - company of Sturmgeschütze
  - company from 600th SS Parachute Battalion
- Element Harem - Panzer-Aufklärungs-Abteilung Speer
  - Motorcycle company
  - Sd.Kfz. 231 company
  - Anti-Tank platoon
- Element Sultan - Marschregiment 2
  - 3 x Schutzen-Kompanie
