= The Children of Golzow =

1961 East German film

The Children of Golzow (Die Kinder von Golzow)
- Directed by: Winfried Junge
- Screenplay by: Barbara Junge
- Produced by: DEFA
- Starring: 18 people from Golzow
- Narrated by: Winfried Junge
- Edited by: Barbara Junge
- Running time: 2,570 minutes (42 hours, 50 min.)
- Countries: East Germany (1961-1990); Germany (1990-2007)
- Language: German

The Children of Golzow (German: Die Kinder von Golzow) is a documentary by the German filmmaker Winfried Junge that was started in 1961 and lasted until 2007, when the series concluded. The film is a prolonged observation of the lives of several people in the Brandenburg village of Golzow.

In 1985, the episode "Lebensläufe" was included in the Guinness Book of World Records as the movie with the longest production period. There is also a museum about the documentary in Golzow.

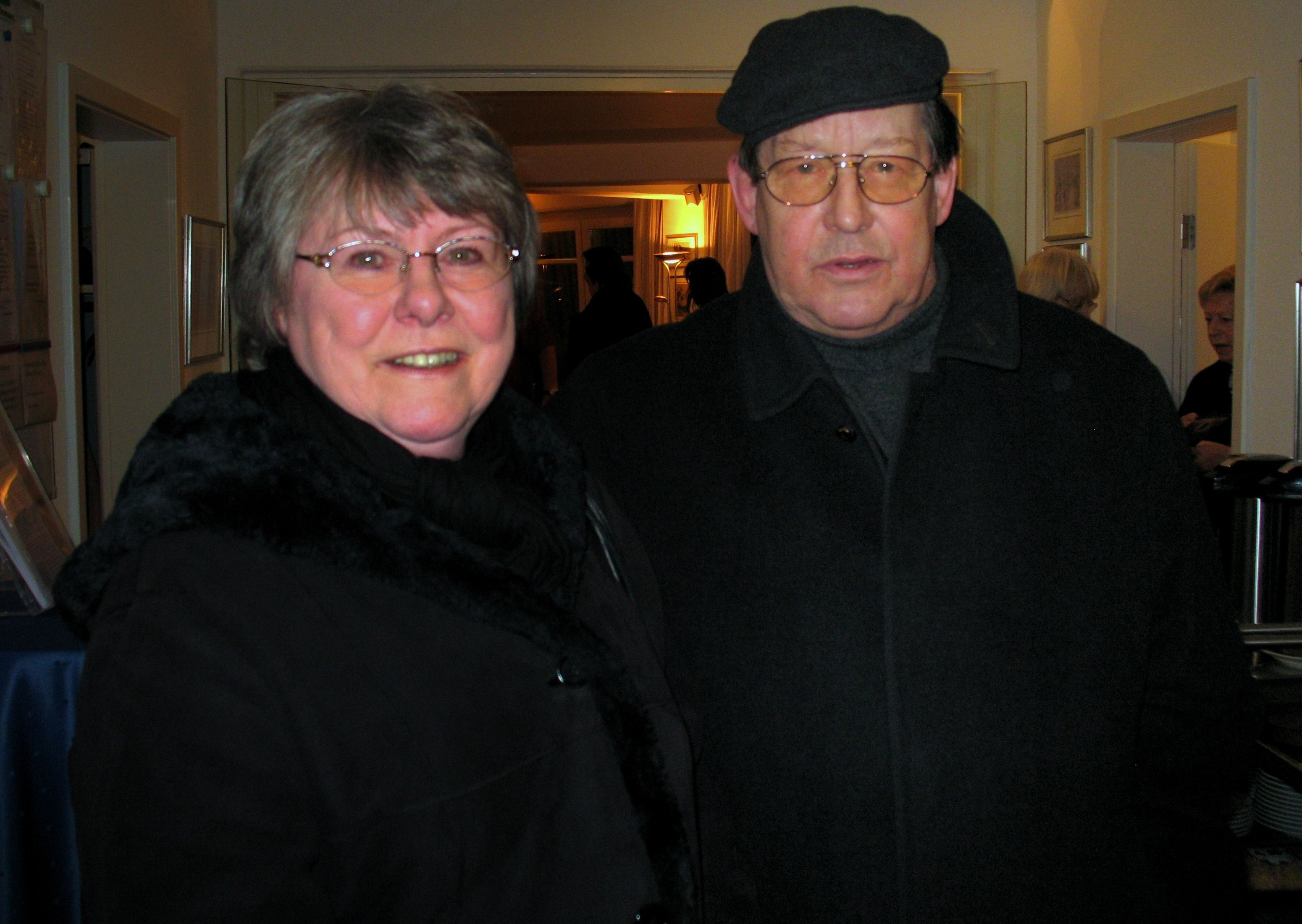
Barbara and Winfried Junge (2010)

== Introduction ==
Eighteen people born between 1953 and 1955 were filmed by Junge and his wife Barbara at regular intervals from 1961 to 2007 in a variety of situations which were both public as well as having a more personal accent (such as the death of a relative).

== Social aspect ==
The films reflect not only the individual life stories of the characters but also provide profound insight into the history of the GDR and the process of German reunification in 1990. After reunification the DEFA film studio closed, so Junge continued the "Golzow-Project" with the ARD and its regional affiliate RBB.

== Idea ==
The idea for the project derives from Karl Gass.

== Segments ==
This is a list of the installments of the "Children of Golzow" until 2007. The titles are in the German language, translation into English in brackets.

1. 1961: Wenn ich erst zur Schule geh [When I finally go to school] (13 min, b/w)
2. 1962: Nach einem Jahr - Beobachtungen in einer ersten Klasse [After a year - observation in a first grade] (14 min, b/w)
3. 1966: Elf Jahre alt [Eleven years old] (29 min, b/w)
4. 1969: Wenn man vierzehn ist [When you are fourteen] (36 min, b/w)
5. 1971: Die Prüfung [The exam] (19 min, b/w)
6. 1975: Ich sprach mit einem Mädchen [I spoke to a girl] (30 min, b/w)
7. 1979/80: Anmut sparet nicht noch Mühe [Neither save grace nor effort] (107 min)
8. 1980: Lebensläufe - Die Geschichte der Kinder von Golzow in einzelnen Portraits [Resume - the story of the children of Golzow in separate portraits] (257 min)
9. 1984: Diese Golzower - Umstandsbestimmung eines Ortes [These inhabitants of Golzow - adversial phrase of a location] (100 min)
10. 1992: Drehbuch: Die Zeiten; Drei Jahrzehnte mit den Kindern von Golzow und der DEFA [Storyline: the times; three decades with the children of Golzow and the DEFA] (284 min, 3 parts)
11. 1994: Das Leben des Jürgen von Golzow [The life of Jürgen from Golzow] (192 min)
12. 1995: Die Geschichte vom Onkel Willy aus Golzow [The story of uncle Willy from Golzow] (145 min)
13. 1996/97: Was geht euch mein Leben an - Elke, Kind von Golzow [My life is none of your business - Elke, child of Golzow] (125 min)
14. 1996/97: Da habt ihr mein Leben - Marieluise, Kind von Golzow [My life there you have it - Marieluise, child of Golzow] (141 min)
15. 1998: Brigitte und Marcel - Golzower Lebenswege [Brigitte and Marcel - Golzow paths of life] (110 min)
16. 1999: Ein Mensch wie Dieter - Golzower [A human like Dieter - from Golzow] (122 min)
17. 2001: Jochen - ein Golzower aus Philadelphia [Jochen - inhabitant of Golzow from Philadelphia] (119 min)
18. 2002: Eigentlich wollte ich Förster werden - Bernd aus Golzow [Actually I wanted to become a forester - Bernd from Golzow] (142 min)
19. 2006: Und wenn sie nicht gestorben sind... - Das Ende der unendlichen Geschichte [And they live happily... The end of the never-ending story] (278 min, 2 parts)
20. 2007: ...dann leben sie noch heute - Das Ende der unendlichen Geschichte [...ever after - The end of the never-ending story] (290 min, 2 parts)

== See also ==
- Up Series
- Springfield Up (The Simpsons episode)
