= Luftwaffe =

Air force of Nazi Germany (1935–1945)

- Emblem of the Luftwaffe
- Founded: 1935; 91 years ago
- Disbanded: 1946; 80 years ago (Note: Official dissolution of the Wehrmacht, including the Luftwaffe, began with Proclamation No. 2 of the Allied Control Council on 20 September 1945 and was not complete until Order No. 34 of 20 August 1946.)
- Country: Germany
- Allegiance: Adolf Hitler
- Type: Air force
- Role: Aerial warfare
- Size: Aircraft: 119,871 (total production); Personnel: 3,400,000 (total in service at any time for 1939–45)
- Part of: Wehrmacht
- Engagements: Spanish Civil War (1936–1939); World War II (1939–1945)

Commanders
- OKL: See list
- Inspector of Fighters: See list
- Inspector of Bombers: See list
- Notable commanders: Hermann Göring; Albert Kesselring; Robert R. von Greim

Insignia
- Balkenkreuz

- Balkenkreuz (alternate)

- Hakenkreuz

Aircraft flown
- List of German WWII planes

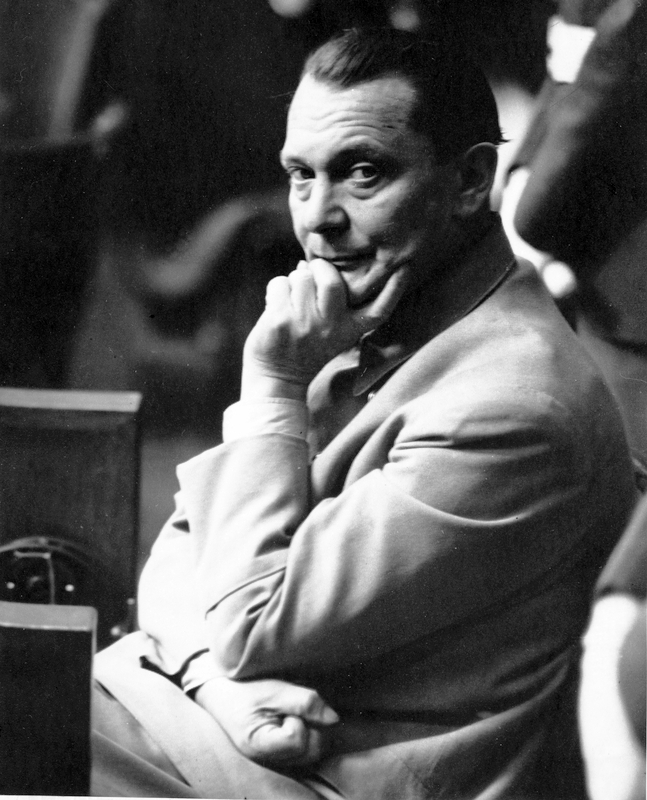
Hermann Göring, the first Supreme Commander of the Luftwaffe (in office: 1935–1945)

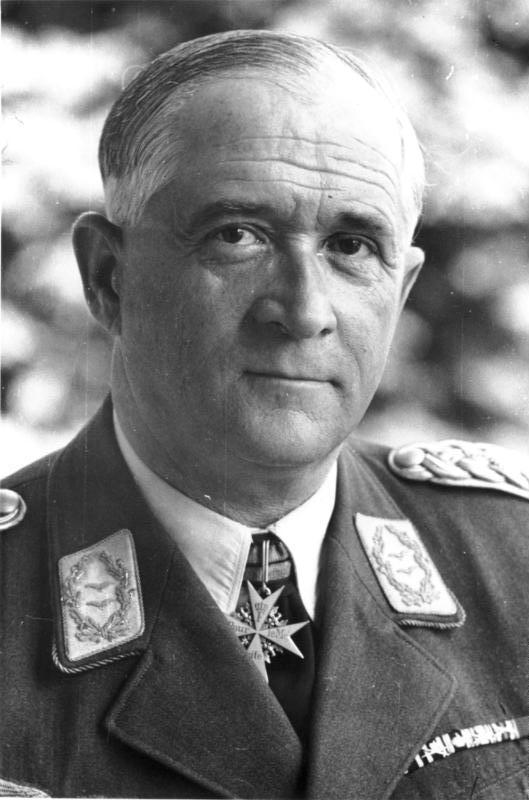
Robert Ritter von Greim, the second and last Supreme Commander of the Luftwaffe (in office: April–May 1945)

The Luftwaffe (Note: Luftwaffe is also the generic term in German-speaking countries for any national military aviation service, and the names of air forces in other countries are usually translated into German as "Luftwaffe" (e.g. Royal Air Force is often translated as "britische Luftwaffe"). However, Luftstreitkräfte, or "air armed force", is also sometimes used as a translation of "air force" for post-World War I air arms, as it was used as the first word of the official German name of the former East German Air Force. Since German Luft translates into English as "air", and "Waffe" may be translated into English as either "weapon" or "arm", "Air Arm" may be considered the most literal English translation of Luftwaffe (cf. Fleet Air Arm).) (German pronunciation: [ˈlʊftvafə]) was the aerial-warfare branch of the Wehrmacht before and during World War II. Germany's military air arms during World War I, the Luftstreitkräfte of the Imperial Army and the Marine-Fliegerabteilung of the Imperial Navy, had been disbanded in May 1920 in accordance with the terms of the 1919 Treaty of Versailles, which banned Germany from having any air force.

During the interwar period, German pilots were trained secretly in violation of the treaty at Lipetsk Air Base in the Soviet Union. With the rise of the Nazi Party and the repudiation of the Versailles Treaty, the Luftwaffe's existence was publicly acknowledged and officially established on 26 February 1935, just over two weeks before open defiance of the Versailles Treaty through German rearmament and conscription would be announced on 16 March. The Condor Legion, a Luftwaffe detachment sent to aid Nationalist forces in the Spanish Civil War, provided the force with a valuable testing ground for new tactics and aircraft. Partially as a result of this combat experience, the Luftwaffe had become one of the most sophisticated, technologically advanced, and battle-experienced air forces in the world when World War II began on 1 September 1939. By the summer of 1939, the Luftwaffe had twenty-eight Geschwader (wings). The Luftwaffe also operated a paratrooper force known as the Fallschirmjäger.

The Luftwaffe proved instrumental in the German victories across Poland 1939 and Western Europe in spring 1940. Although the Luftwaffe inflicted severe damage to the RAF's infrastructure during the Battle of Britain and devastated many British cities during the subsequent Blitz, it failed to force the British into submission. In 1941 with the Invasion of Yugoslavia, German invasion of Greece and since June 1941 against the Soviet Union, the Luftwaffe was very successful.

From 1942, Allied bombing campaigns gradually destroyed the Luftwaffe's fighter arm. From late 1942, the Luftwaffe used its surplus ground support and other personnel to raise Luftwaffe Field Divisions. In addition to its service on the Western front, the Luftwaffe operated over the Soviet Union, North Africa, and Southern Europe. Despite its belated use of advanced turbojet and rocket-propelled aircraft for the destruction of Allied bombers, the Luftwaffe was overwhelmed by the Allies' superior numbers and improved tactics, and a lack of trained pilots and aviation fuel. In January 1945, during the closing stages of the Battle of the Bulge, the Luftwaffe made a last-ditch effort to win air superiority, and met with failure. With rapidly dwindling supplies of petroleum, oil, and lubricants after this campaign, and as part of the entire combined Wehrmacht military forces as a whole, the Luftwaffe ceased to be an effective fighting force.

After the defeat of Nazi Germany, the Luftwaffe was disbanded in 1946. During World War II, German pilots claimed roughly 70,000 aerial victories, while over 75,000 Luftwaffe aircraft were destroyed or significantly damaged. Of these, nearly 40,000 were lost entirely. The Luftwaffe had only two commanders-in-chief throughout its history: Reichsmarschall Hermann Göring and later Generalfeldmarschall Robert Ritter von Greim for the last two weeks of the war.

The Luftwaffe was deeply involved in Nazi war crimes. By the end of the war, a significant percentage of aircraft production originated in concentration camps, an industry employing tens of thousands of forced laborers. (Note: In January 1944, Messerschmitt and contractors were using 7564 concentration camp prisoners, Heinkel and subsidiaries employed a further 9724, and Junkers used 1571. Heinkel used forced labor at Mielec and the Mauthausen subcamps Wien-Floridsdorf, Hinterbrühl, and Schwechat. Junkers had factories at Wiener Neudorf (also a subcamp of Mauthausen); and operated factories at Buchenwald subcamps Mühlhausen, Stempeda and Harzungen.) The Luftwaffe's demand for labor was one of the factors that led to the deportation and murder of hundreds of thousands of Hungarian Jews in 1944. The Luftwaffe frequently bombed non-military targets, the Oberkommando der Luftwaffe organised Nazi human experimentation, and Luftwaffe ground troops committed massacres in Italy, Greece, and Poland.

== History ==
=== Origins ===
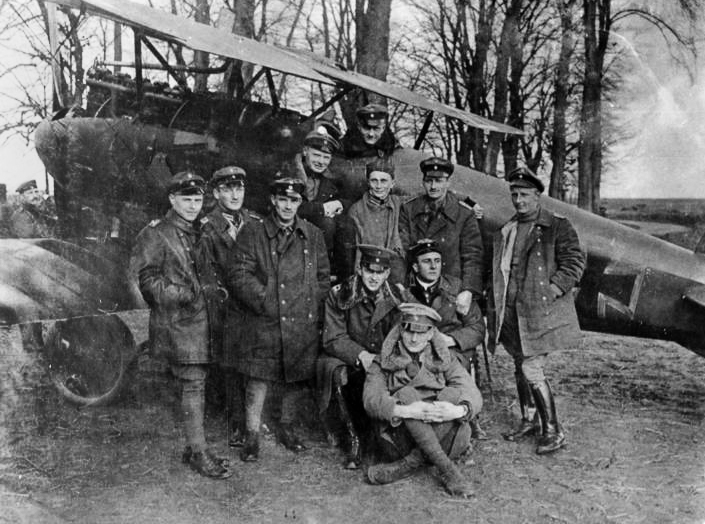
Manfred von Richthofen with other members of Jasta 11, 1917 as part of the Luftstreitkräfte

The Imperial German Army Air Service was founded in 1910 with the name Die Fliegertruppen des deutschen Kaiserreiches, most often shortened to Fliegertruppe. It was renamed the Luftstreitkräfte on 8 October 1916. The air war on the Western Front received the most attention in the annals of the earliest accounts of military aviation, since it produced aces such as Manfred von Richthofen, Ernst Udet, Oswald Boelcke, and Max Immelmann. After the defeat of Germany, the service was dissolved on 8 May 1920 under the conditions of the Treaty of Versailles, which also mandated the destruction of all German military aircraft.

Since the Treaty of Versailles forbade Germany to have an air force, German pilots trained in secret. Initially, civil aviation schools within Germany were used, yet only light trainers could be used in order to maintain the façade that the trainees were going to fly with civil airlines such as Deutsche Luft Hansa. To train its pilots on the latest combat aircraft, Germany solicited the help of the Soviet Union, which was also isolated in Europe. A secret training airfield was established at Lipetsk in 1924 and operated for approximately nine years using mostly Dutch and Soviet, but also some German, training aircraft before being closed in 1933. This base was officially known as the 4th squadron of the 40th wing of the Red Army. Hundreds of Luftwaffe pilots and technical personnel visited, studied, and were trained at Soviet Air Force schools in several locations in Central Russia. Roessing, Blume, Fosse, Teetsemann, Heini, Makratzki, Blumendaat, and many other future Luftwaffe aces were trained in the USSR in joint Soviet-German schools that were set up under the patronage of Ernst August Köstring.

The first steps towards the Luftwaffe's formation were undertaken just months after Adolf Hitler came to power. Hermann Göring, a World War I ace, became National Kommissar for aviation with former Luft Hansa director Erhard Milch as his deputy. In April 1933, the Reich Aviation Ministry (Reichsluftfahrtministerium or RLM) was established. The RLM was in charge of the development and production of aircraft. Göring's control over all aspects of aviation became absolute. On 25 March 1933, the German Air Sports Association absorbed all private and national organisations, while retaining its 'sports' title. On 15 May 1933, all military aviation organisations in the RLM were merged, forming the Luftwaffe; its official 'birthday'. The National Socialist Flyers Corps (Nationalsozialistisches Fliegerkorps or NSFK) was formed in 1937 to give pre-military flying training to male youths, and to engage adult sport aviators in the Nazi movement. Military-age members of the NSFK were drafted into the Luftwaffe. As all such prior NSFK members were also Nazi Party members, this gave the new Luftwaffe a strong Nazi ideological base in contrast to the other branches of the Wehrmacht (the Heer (army) and the Kriegsmarine (navy)). Göring played a leading role in the buildup of the Luftwaffe in 1933–36, but had little further involvement in the development of the force after 1936, and Milch became the "de facto" minister until 1937.

The absence of Göring in planning and production matters was fortunate. Göring had little knowledge of current aviation, had last flown in 1922, and had not kept himself informed of the latest events. Göring also displayed a lack of understanding of doctrine and technical issues in aerial warfare which he left to others more competent. The Commander-in-Chief left the organisation and building of the Luftwaffe, after 1936, to Erhard Milch. However, Göring, as a part of Hitler's inner circle, provided access to financial resources and materiel for rearming and equipping the Luftwaffe.

Another prominent figure in German air power construction this time was Helmuth Wilberg. Wilberg later played a large role in the development of German air doctrine. Having headed the Reichswehr air staff for eight years in the 1920s, Wilberg had considerable experience and was ideal for a senior staff position. Göring considered making Wilberg Chief of Staff (CS). However, it was revealed Wilberg had a Jewish mother. For that reason, Göring could not have him as CS. Not wishing his talent to go to waste, Göring ensured the racial policy of Nazi Germany did not apply to him. Wilberg remained in the air staff, and under Walther Wever helped draw up the Luftwaffe's principle doctrinal texts, "The Conduct of the Aerial War" and "Regulation 16".

=== Preparing for war: 1933–1939 ===
==== Wever years, 1933–1936 ====
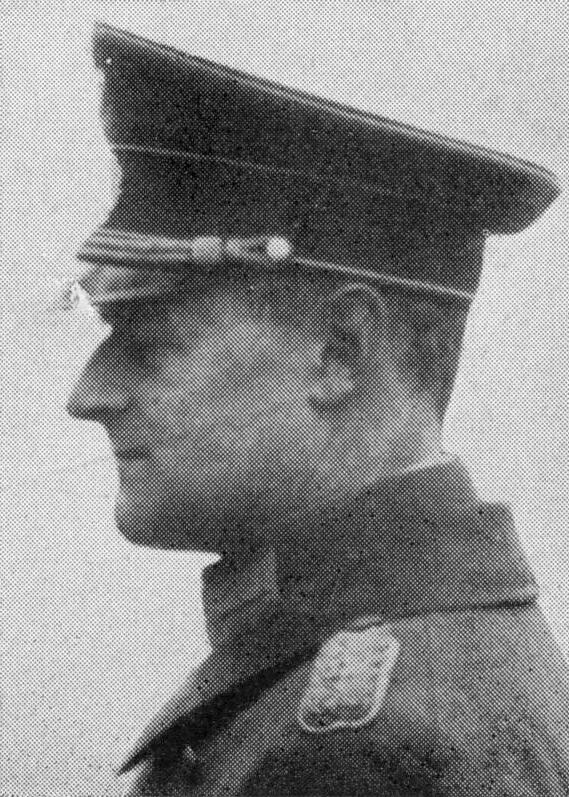
Walther Wever, Chief of the Luftwaffe General Staff, 1933–1936

The German officer corps was keen to develop strategic bombing capabilities against its enemies. However, economic and geopolitical considerations had to take priority. The German air power theorists continued to develop strategic theories, but emphasis was given to army support, as Germany was a continental power and expected to face ground operations following any declaration of hostilities.

For these reasons, between 1933 and 1934, the Luftwaffe's leadership was primarily concerned with tactical and operational methods. In aerial terms, the army concept of Truppenführung was an operational concept, as well as a tactical doctrine. In World War I, the Fliegertruppe's initial, 1914–15 era Feldflieger Abteilung observation/reconnaissance air units, each with six two-seater aircraft apiece, had been attached to specific army formations and acted as support. Dive bomber units were considered essential to Truppenführung, attacking enemy headquarters and lines of communications. Luftwaffe "Regulation 10: The Bomber" (Dienstvorschrift 10: Das Kampfflugzeug), published in 1934, advocated air superiority and approaches to ground attack tactics without dealing with operational matters. Until 1935, the 1926 manual "Directives for the Conduct of the Operational Air War" continued to act as the main guide for German air operations. The manual directed OKL to focus on limited operations (not strategic operations): the protection of specific areas and support of the army in combat.

With an effective tactical-operational concept, the German air power theorists needed a strategic doctrine and organisation. Robert Knauss, a serviceman (not a pilot) in the Luftstreitkräfte during World War I, and later an experienced pilot with Lufthansa, was a prominent theorist of air power. Knauss promoted the Giulio Douhet theory that air power could win wars alone by destroying enemy industry and breaking enemy morale by "terrorising the population" of major cities. This advocated attacks on civilians. The General Staff blocked the entry of Douhet's theory into doctrine, fearing revenge strikes against German civilians and cities.

In December 1934, Chief of the Luftwaffe General Staff Walther Wever sought to mold the Luftwaffe's battle doctrine into a strategic plan. At this time, Wever conducted war games (simulated against France) in a bid to establish his theory of a strategic bombing force that would, he thought, prove decisive by winning the war through the destruction of enemy industry, even though these exercises also included tactical strikes against enemy ground forces and communications. In 1935, "Luftwaffe Regulation 16: The Conduct of the Air War" was drawn up. In the proposal, it concluded, "The mission of the Luftwaffe is to serve these goals."

Historian James Corum states that under this doctrine, the Luftwaffe leadership rejected the practice of "terror bombing" (see Luftwaffe strategic bombing doctrine). According to Corum, terror bombing was deemed to be "counter-productive", increasing rather than destroying the enemy's will to resist. Such bombing campaigns were regarded as diversion from the Luftwaffe's main operations; destruction of the enemy armed forces.

Nevertheless, Wever recognised the importance of strategic bombing. In newly introduced doctrine, The Conduct of the Aerial Air War in 1935, Wever rejected the theory of Douhet and outlined five key points to air strategy:

1. To destroy the enemy air force by bombing its bases and aircraft factories, and defeating enemy air forces attacking German targets
2. To prevent the movement of large enemy ground forces to the decisive areas by destroying railways and roads, particularly bridges and tunnels, which are indispensable for the movement and supply of forces
3. To support the operations of the army formations, independent of railways, i.e, armoured forces and motorised forces, by impeding the enemy advance and participating directly in ground operations
4. To support naval operations by attacking naval bases, protecting Germany's naval bases and participating directly in naval battles
5. To paralyze the enemy armed forces by stopping production in the armaments factories

Wever began planning for a strategic bomber force and sought to incorporate strategic bombing into a war strategy. He believed that tactical aircraft should only be used as a step to developing a strategic air force. In May 1934, Wever initiated a seven-year project to develop the so-called "Ural bomber", which could strike as far as into the heart of the Soviet Union. In 1935, this design competition led to the Dornier Do 19 and Junkers Ju 89 prototypes, although both were underpowered. In April 1936, Wever issued requirements for the 'Bomber A' design competition: a range of 6,700 kilometres (4,200 mi) with a 900 kilograms (2,000 lb) bomb load. However, Wever's vision of a "Ural" bomber was never realised, and his emphasis on strategic aerial operations was lost. The only design submittal for Wever's 'Bomber A' that reached production was Heinkel's Projekt 1041, which culminated in the production and frontline service as Germany's only operational heavy bomber, the Heinkel He 177, on 5 November 1937, the date on which it received its RLM airframe number.

In 1935, the military functions of the RLM were grouped into the Oberkommando der Luftwaffe (OKL; "Air Force High Command").

Following the untimely death of Wever in early June 1936 in an aviation-related accident, by the late 1930s the Luftwaffe had no clear purpose. The air force was not subordinated to the army support role, and it was not given any particular strategic mission. German doctrine fell between the two concepts. The Luftwaffe was to be an organisation capable of carrying out broad and general support tasks rather than any specific mission. Mainly, this path was chosen to encourage more flexible use of air power and offer the ground forces the right conditions for a decisive victory. In fact, on the outbreak of war, only 15% of the Luftwaffe's aircraft were devoted to ground support operations, counter to the long-held myth that the Luftwaffe was designed for only tactical and operational missions.

==== Change of direction, 1936–37 ====
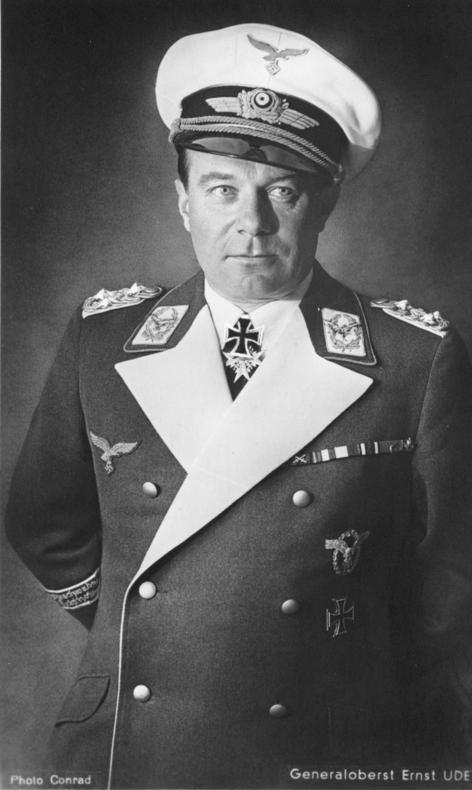
General Ernst Udet. Along with Albert Kesselring, Udet was responsible for establishing the design trend of German aircraft. His focus was on tactical army support air forces.

Wever's participation in the construction of the Luftwaffe came to an abrupt end on 3 June 1936 when he was killed along with his engineer in a Heinkel He 70 Blitz, ironically on the very day that his "Bomber A" heavy bomber design competition was announced. After Wever's death, Göring began taking more of an interest in the appointment of Luftwaffe staff officers. Göring appointed his successor Albert Kesselring as Chief of Staff and Ernst Udet to head the Reich's Air Ministry Technical Office (Technisches Amt), although he was not a technical expert. Despite this Udet helped change the Luftwaffe's tactical direction towards fast medium bombers to destroy enemy air power in the battle zone rather than through industrial bombing of its aviation production.

Kesselring and Udet did not get on. During Kesselring's time as CS, 1936–1937, a power struggle developed between the two as Udet attempted to extend his own power within the Luftwaffe. Kesselring also had to contend with Göring appointing "yes men" to positions of importance. Udet realised his limitations, and his failures in the production and development of German aircraft would have serious long term consequences.

The failure of the Luftwaffe to progress further towards attaining a strategic bombing force was attributable to several reasons. Many in the Luftwaffe command believed medium bombers to be sufficient power to launch strategic bombing operations against Germany's most likely enemies; France, Czechoslovakia, and Poland. The United Kingdom presented greater problems. General der Flieger Hellmuth Felmy, commander of Luftflotte 2 in 1939, was charged with devising a plan for an air war over the British Isles. Felmy was convinced that Britain could be defeated through morale bombing. Felmy noted the alleged panic that had broken out in London during the Munich crisis, evidence he believed of British weakness. A second reason was technical. German designers had never solved the issues of the Heinkel He 177A's design difficulties, brought on by the requirement from its inception on 5 November 1937 to have moderate dive-bombing capabilities in a 30-meter wingspan aircraft. Moreover, Germany did not possess the economic resources to match the later British and American effort of 1943–1944, particularly in large-scale mass production of high power output aircraft engines (with output of over least 1,500 kW (2,000 hp)). In addition, the OKL had not foreseen the industrial and military effort strategic bombing would require. By 1939 the Luftwaffe was not much better prepared than its enemies to conduct a strategic bombing campaign, with fatal results during the Battle of Britain.

The German rearmament programme faced difficulties acquiring raw materials. Germany imported most of its essential materials for rebuilding the Luftwaffe, in particular rubber and aluminum. Petroleum imports were particularly vulnerable to blockade. Germany pushed for synthetic fuel plants but still failed to meet demands. In 1937 Germany imported more fuel than it had at the start of the decade. By summer 1938, only 25% of the requirements could be covered. In steel materials, industry was operating at barely 83% of capacity, and by November 1938 Göring reported the economic situation was serious. The Oberkommando der Wehrmacht (OKW), the overall command for all German military forces, ordered reductions in raw materials and steel used for armament production. The figures for reduction were substantial: 30% steel, 20% copper, 47% aluminum, and 14% rubber. Under such circumstances, it was not possible for Milch, Udet, or Kesselring to produce a formidable strategic bombing force even had they wanted to do so.

The development of aircraft was now confined to the production of twin-engined medium bombers that required much less material, manpower, and aviation production capacity than Wever's "Ural Bomber". German industry could build two medium bombers for one heavy bomber and the RLM would not gamble on developing a heavy bomber which would also take time. Göring remarked, "the Führer will not ask how big the bombers there are, but only how many there are." The premature death of Wever, one of the Luftwaffe's finest officers, left the Luftwaffe without a strategic air force during World War II, which eventually proved fatal to the German war effort.

The lack of strategic capability should have been apparent much earlier. The Sudeten Crisis highlighted German unpreparedness to conduct a strategic air war (although the British and French were in a much weaker position), and Hitler ordered the Luftwaffe be expanded to five times its earlier size. The OKL badly neglected the need for transport aircraft; even in 1943, transport units were described as Kampfgeschwadern zur besonderen Verwendung (Bomber Units on Special Duties, KGzbV). and only grouping them together into dedicated cargo and personnel transport wings (Transportgeschwader) during that year. In March 1938, as the Anschluss was taking place, Göring ordered Felmy to investigate the prospect of air raids against Britain. Felmy concluded it was not possible until bases in Belgium and the Netherlands were obtained and the Luftwaffe had heavy bombers. It mattered little, as war was avoided by the Munich Agreement, and the need for long-range aircraft did not arise.

These failures were not exposed until wartime. In the meantime, German designs of mid-1930s origin such as the Messerschmitt Bf 109, the Heinkel He 111, the Junkers Ju 87 Stuka, and the Dornier Do 17, performed very well. All first saw active service in the Condor Legion against Soviet-supplied aircraft. The Luftwaffe also quickly realised the days of the biplane fighter were finished, the Heinkel He 51 being switched to service as a trainer. Particularly impressive were the Heinkel and Dornier, which fulfilled the Luftwaffe's requirements for bombers that were faster than 1930s-era fighters, many of which were biplanes or strut-braced monoplanes.

Despite the participation of these aircraft (mainly from 1938 onward), it was the venerable Junkers Ju 52 (which soon became the backbone of the Transportgruppen) that made the main contribution. During the Spanish Civil War Hitler remarked, "Franco ought to erect a monument to the glory of the Junkers Ju 52. It is the aircraft which the Spanish revolution has to thank for its victory."

==== Dive-bombing ====
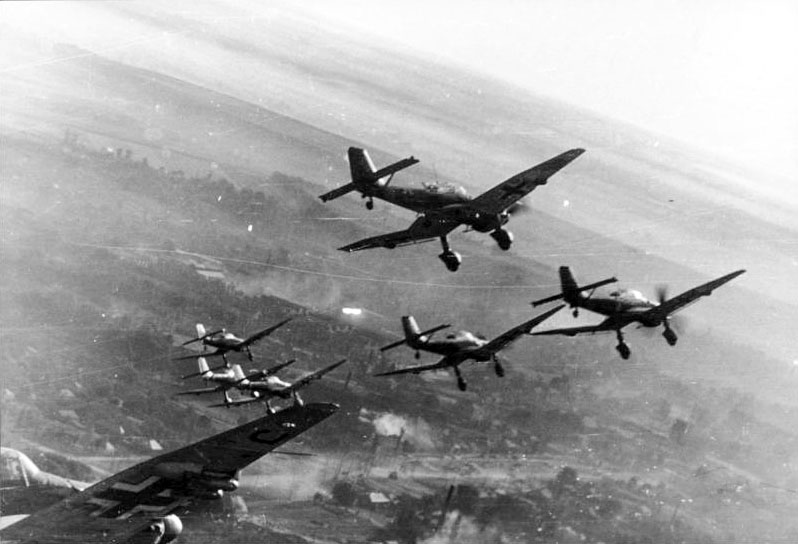
Junkers Ju 87Ds over the Eastern Front, winter 1943–44

Poor accuracy from level bombers in 1937 led the Luftwaffe to grasp the benefits of dive-bombing. The latter could achieve far better accuracy against tactical ground targets than heavier conventional bombers. Range was not a key criterion for this mission. It was not always feasible for the army to move heavy artillery over recently captured territory to bombard fortifications or support ground forces, and dive bombers could do the job faster. Dive bombers, often single-engine two-man machines, could achieve better results than larger six or seven-man aircraft, at a tenth of the cost and four times the accuracy. This led to Udet championing the dive bomber, particularly the Junkers Ju 87.

Udet's "love affair" with dive-bombing seriously affected the long-term development of the Luftwaffe, especially after Wever's death. The tactical strike aircraft programmes were meant to serve as interim solutions until the next generation of aircraft arrived. In 1936 the Junkers Ju 52 was the backbone of the German bomber fleet. This led to a rush on the part of the RLM to produce the Junkers Ju 86, the Heinkel He 111, and the Dornier Do 17 before a proper evaluation was made. The Ju 86 was poor while the He 111 showed the most promise. The Spanish Civil War convinced Udet (along with limited output from the German munitions industry) that wastage was not acceptable in munition terms. Udet sought to build dive-bombing into the Junkers Ju 88 and conveyed the same idea, initiated specifically by the OKL for the Heinkel He 177, approved in early November 1937. In the case of the Ju 88, 50,000 modifications had to be made. The weight was increased from seven to twelve tons. This resulted in a speed loss of 200 km/h. Udet merely conveyed the OKL's own dive-bombing capability request to Ernst Heinkel concerning the He 177, who vehemently opposed such an idea, which ruined its development as a heavy bomber. Göring was not able to rescind the dive-bombing requirement for the He 177A until September 1942.

==== Mobilisation, 1938–1941 ====
By the summer of 1939, the Luftwaffe had ready for combat nine Jagdgeschwader (fighter wings) mostly equipped with the Messerschmitt Bf 109E, four Zerstörergeschwader (destroyer wings) equipped with the Messerschmitt Bf 110 heavy fighters, 11 Kampfgeschwader (bomber wings) equipped mainly with the Heinkel He 111 and the Dornier Do 17Z, and four Sturzkampfgeschwader (dive bomber wings) primarily armed with the iconic Junkers Ju 87B Stuka. The Luftwaffe was just starting to accept the Junkers Ju 88A for service, as it had encountered design difficulties, with only a dozen aircraft of the type considered combat-ready. The Luftwaffe's strength at this time stood at 373,000 personnel (208,000 flying troops, 107,000 in the Flak Corps, and 58,000 in the Signals Corps). Aircraft strength was 4,201 operational aircraft: 1,191 bombers, 361 dive bombers, 788 fighters, 431 heavy fighters, and 488 transports. Despite deficiencies, it was an impressive force.

However, even by the spring of 1940, the Luftwaffe still had not mobilised fully. Despite the shortage of raw materials, Udet had increased production through introducing a 10-hour working day for aviation industries and rationalising production. During this period 30 Kampfstaffeln and 16 Jagdstaffeln were raised and equipped. A further five Zerstörergruppen ("Destroyer groups") were created (JGr 101, 102, 126, 152 and 176), all equipped with the Bf 110.

The Luftwaffe also greatly expanded its aircrew training programmes by 42%, to 63 flying schools. These facilities were moved to eastern Germany, away from possible Allied threats. The number of aircrew reached 4,727, an increase of 31%. However, the rush to complete this rapid expansion scheme resulted in the deaths of 997 personnel and another 700 wounded. 946 aircraft were also destroyed in these accidents. The number of aircrew completing their training was up to 3,941, The Luftwaffe's entire strength was now 2.2 million personnel.

In April and May 1941, Udet headed the Luftwaffe delegation inspecting the Soviet aviation industry in compliance with the Molotov–Ribbentrop Pact. Udet informed Göring "that Soviet air forces are very strong and technically advanced." Göring decided not to report the facts to Hitler, hoping that a surprise attack would quickly destroy the USSR. Udet realised that the upcoming war with the USSR might cripple Germany. Udet, torn between truth and loyalty, suffered a psychological breakdown and even tried to tell Hitler the truth, but Göring told Hitler that Udet was lying, then took Udet under control by giving him drugs at drinking parties and hunting trips. Udet's drinking and psychological condition became a problem, but Göring used Udet's dependency to manipulate him.

=== Commanders ===
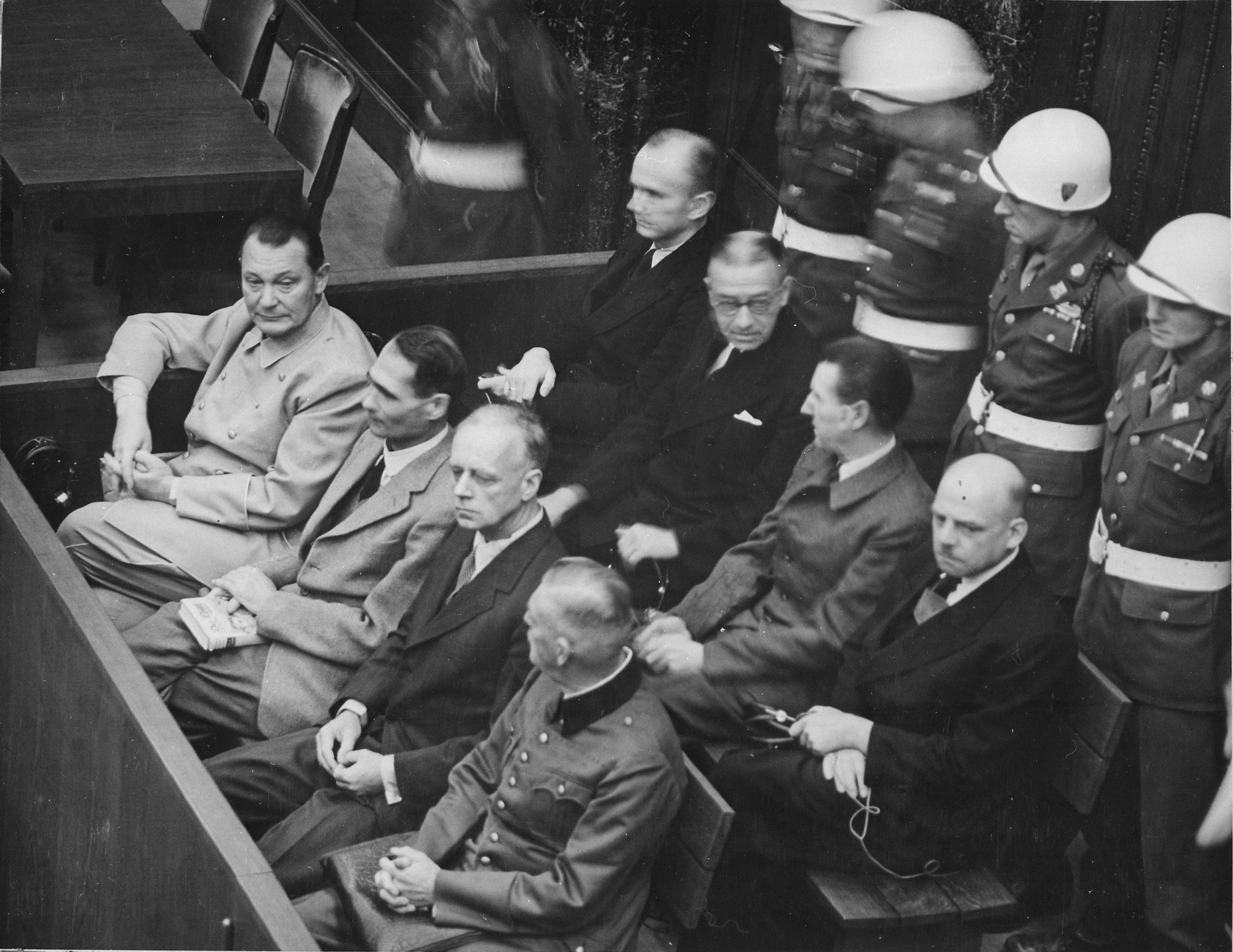
Defendants in the dock during the Nuremberg trials. The main target of the prosecution was Hermann Göring (at the left edge on the first row of benches), considered to be the most important surviving Nazi official after Adolf Hitler's death.

Throughout the history of Nazi Germany, the Luftwaffe had only two commanders-in-chief. The first was Göring, with the second and last being Generalfeldmarschall Robert Ritter von Greim. His appointment as commander-in-chief of the Luftwaffe was concomitant with his promotion to Generalfeldmarschall, the last German officer in World War II to be promoted to the highest rank. Other officers promoted to the second highest military rank in Germany were Kesselring, Hugo Sperrle, Milch, and Wolfram von Richthofen.

At the end of the war, with Berlin surrounded by the Red Army, Göring suggested to Hitler that he take over leadership of the Reich. Hitler ordered his arrest and execution, but Göring's SS guards did not carry out the order, and Göring survived to be tried at Nuremberg.

Sperrle was prosecuted at the OKW trial, one of the last twelve of the Nuremberg trials after the war. He was acquitted on all four counts. He died in Munich in 1953.

=== Organisation and chain of command ===
At the start of the war the Luftwaffe had four Luftflotten (air fleets), each responsible for roughly a quarter of Germany. As the war progressed more air fleets were created as the areas under German rule expanded. As one example, Luftflotte 5 was created in 1940 to direct operations in Norway and Denmark, and other Luftflotten were created as necessary. Each Luftflotte would contain several Fliegerkorps (Air Corps), Fliegerdivision (Air Division), Jagdkorps (Fighter Corps), Jagddivision (Air Division), or Jagdfliegerführer (Fighter Air Command). Each formations would have attached to it a number of units, usually several Geschwader, but also independent Staffeln and Kampfgruppen. Luftflotten were also responsible for the training aircraft and schools in their operational areas.

A Geschwader was commanded by a Geschwaderkommodore, with the rank of either major, Oberstleutnant (lieutenant colonel) or Oberst (colonel). Other "staff" officers within the unit with administrative duties included the adjutant, technical officer, and operations officer, who were usually (though not always) experienced aircrew or pilots still flying on operations. Other specialist staff were navigation, signals, and intelligence personnel. A Stabschwarm (headquarters flight) was attached to each Geschwader.

A Jagdgeschwader (hunting wing) (JG) was a single-seat day fighter Geschwader, typically equipped with Bf 109 or Fw 190 aircraft flying in the fighter or fighter-bomber roles. Late in the war, by 1944–45, JG 7 and JG 400 (and the jet specialist JV 44) flew much more advanced aircraft, with JG 1 working up with the Heinkel He 162 "emergency fighter" at war's end. A Geschwader consisted of groups (Gruppen), which in turn consisted of Jagdstaffel (fighter squadrons). Hence, Fighter Wing 1 was JG 1, its first Gruppe (group) was I./JG 1, using a Roman numeral for the Gruppe number only, and its first Staffel (squadron) was 1./JG 1. Geschwader strength was usually 120–125 aircraft.

Each Gruppe was commanded by a Kommandeur, and a Staffel by a Staffelkapitän. However, these were "appointments", not ranks, within the Luftwaffe. Usually, the Kommodore would hold the rank of Oberstleutnant or, exceptionally, an Oberst. Even a Leutnant (second lieutenant) could find himself commanding a Staffel.

Similarly, a bomber wing was a Kampfgeschwader (KG), a night fighter wing was a Nachtjagdgeschwader (NJG), a dive bomber wing was a Stukageschwader (StG), and units equivalent to those in RAF Coastal Command, with specific responsibilities for coastal patrols and search and rescue duties, were Küstenfliegergruppen (Kü.Fl. Gr.). Specialist bomber groups were known as Kampfgruppen (KGr). The strength of a bomber Geschwader was about 80–90 aircraft.

=== Personnel ===
Luftwaffe strength during the fall of 1941
Forces	Personnel strength
Flying units	500,000
Anti-aircraft units	500,000
Air signal units	250,000
Construction units	150,000
Landsturm units	36,000

The peacetime strength of the Luftwaffe in the spring of 1939 was 370,000 men. After mobilisation in 1939 almost 900,000 men served, and just before Operation Barbarossa in 1941 personnel strength had reached 1.5 million men. The Luftwaffe reached its largest personnel strength during the period November 1943 to June 1944, with almost three million men and women in uniform; 1.7 million of these were male soldiers, 1 million male Wehrmachtsbeamte and civilian employees, and almost 300,000 female and male auxiliaries (Luftwaffenhelfer). In October 1944, the anti-aircraft units had 600,000 soldiers and 530,000 auxiliaries, including 60,000 male members of the Reichsarbeitsdienst, 50,000 Luftwaffenhelfer (males age 15–17), 80,000 Flakwehrmänner (males above military age) and Flak-V-soldaten (males unfit for military service), and 160,000 female Flakwaffenhelferinnen and RAD-Maiden, as well as 160,000 foreign personnel (Hiwis).

=== Spanish Civil War ===
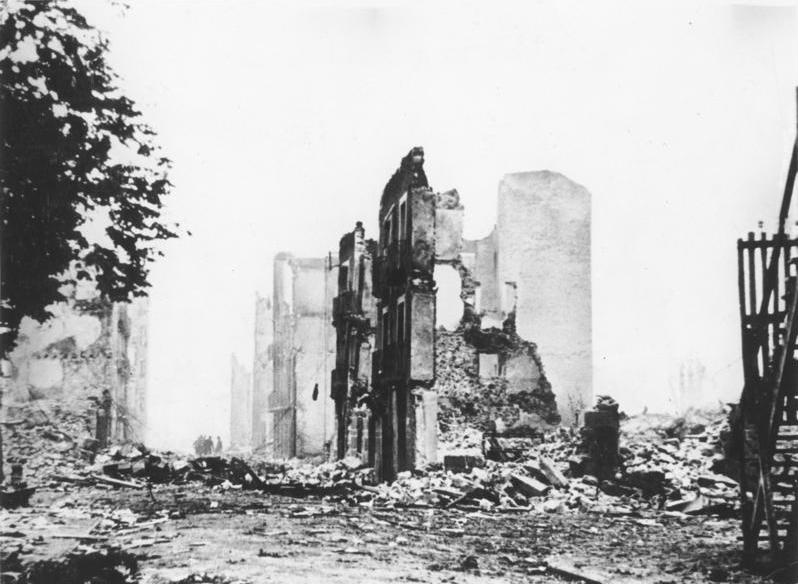
Ruins of Guernica, 1937

The Luftwaffe's Condor Legion experimented with new doctrine and aircraft during the Spanish Civil War. It helped the Falange under Francisco Franco to defeat the Republican forces. Over 20,000 German airmen gained combat experience that would give the Luftwaffe an important advantage going into the Second World War. One infamous operation was the bombing of Guernica in the Basque country. It is commonly assumed this attack was the result of a "terror doctrine" in Luftwaffe doctrine. The raids on Guernica and Madrid caused many civilian casualties and a wave of protests from abroad. It has been suggested that the bombing of Guernica was carried out for military tactical reasons, in support of ground operations, but the town was not directly involved in any fighting at that point in time. It was not until 1942 that the Germans started to develop a bombing policy in which civilians were the primary targets, although the Blitz on London and many other British cities involved indiscriminate bombing of civilian areas, 'nuisance raids' which could even involve the machine-gunning of civilians and livestock.

=== World War II ===
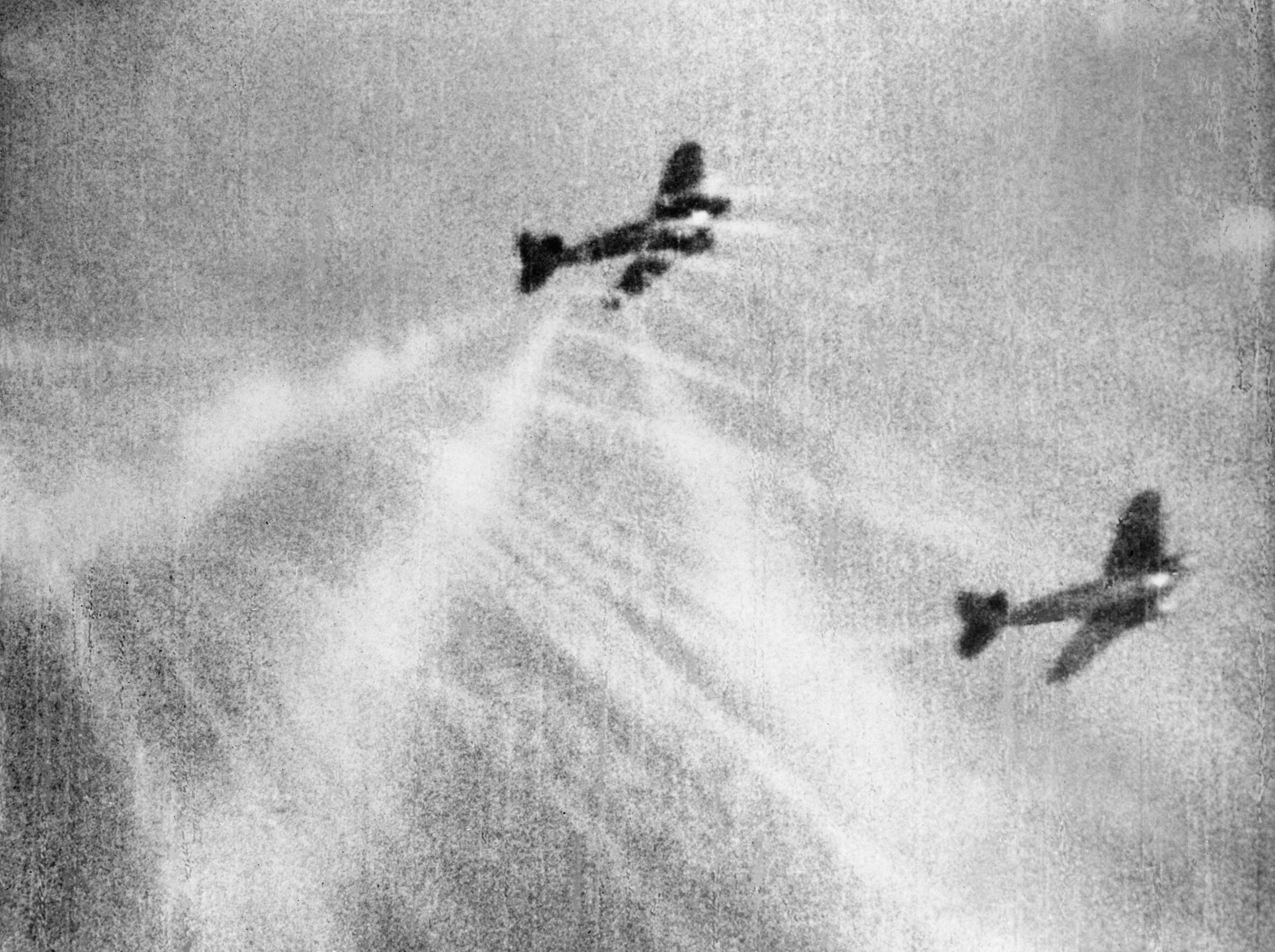
Gun camera film showing tracer ammunition from a Supermarine Spitfire hitting a Heinkel He 111 bomber on its starboard quarter

When World War II began in 1939, the Luftwaffe was one of the most technologically advanced air forces in the world. During the Polish Campaign that triggered the war, it quickly established air superiority, and then air supremacy. It supported the German Army operations which ended the campaign in five weeks. The Luftwaffe's performance was as the OKL had hoped. The Luftwaffe rendered invaluable support to the army, mopping up pockets of resistance. Göring was delighted with the performance. Command and control problems occurred, but flexibility and improvisation in both the army and the Luftwaffe solved these problems. The Luftwaffe was to have in place a ground-to-air communication system, which played a vital role in the success of 1940's Fall Gelb.

In the spring of 1940 the Luftwaffe assisted the Kriegsmarine and Heer in the invasion of Norway. Flying in reinforcements and winning air superiority, the Luftwaffe contributed decisively to the German conquest.

In May and June 1940, the Luftwaffe contributed to the unexpected German success in the Battle of France. It destroyed three Allied Air Forces and helped secure the defeat of France in just over six weeks. However, it could not destroy the British Expeditionary Force at Dunkirk despite intense bombing. The BEF escaped to continue the war.

During the Battle of Britain in summer 1940, the Luftwaffe inflicted severe damage on Britain's Royal Air Force, but did not achieve the air superiority that Hitler had demanded for the proposed invasion of Britain, which was postponed and then canceled in December 1940. The Luftwaffe ravaged British cities during the Blitz of 1940–1941, but failed to break British morale, and the RAF shot down German planes by over a two to one ratio. Hitler had already ordered preparations for Operation Barbarossa, the invasion of the Soviet Union.

In spring 1941 the Luftwaffe helped its Axis partner, Italy, secure victory in the Balkans Campaign and continued to support Italy or the Italian Social Republic in the Mediterranean, Middle East and African theaters until May 1945.

In June 1941, Germany invaded the Soviet Union. Despite destroying thousands of Soviet aircraft, the Luftwaffe failed to destroy the Red Air Force altogether. Lacking strategic bombers (the very "Ural bombers" that Wever had asked for six years before) the Luftwaffe could not strike at Soviet production-centres regularly or with the needed force. The Axis and Soviet air operations during Operation Barbarossa consumed vast numbers of men and planes. As the war dragged on, the Luftwaffe was eroded in strength. German defeats at the Battle of Stalingrad in 1942 and in the Battle of Kursk in 1943 ensured the gradual decline of the Wehrmacht on the Eastern Front.

British historian Frederick Taylor asserts that "all sides bombed each other's cities during the war. Half a million Soviet citizens, for example, died from German bombing during the invasion and occupation of Russia. That's roughly equivalent to the number of German citizens who died from Allied raids."

The Luftwaffe defended German-occupied Europe against the growing offensive power of RAF Bomber Command and, starting in the summer of 1942, the steadily building strength of the United States Army Air Forces. The mounting demands of the Defence of the Reich campaign gradually destroyed the Luftwaffe's fighter arm. Despite its belated use of advanced turbojet and rocket-propelled aircraft for bomber-destroyer duties, it was overwhelmed by Allied numbers and a lack of trained pilots and fuel. A last-ditch attempt, known as Operation Bodenplatte, to win air superiority on 1 January 1945 failed. After the Bodenplatte effort, the Luftwaffe ceased to be an effective fighting force.

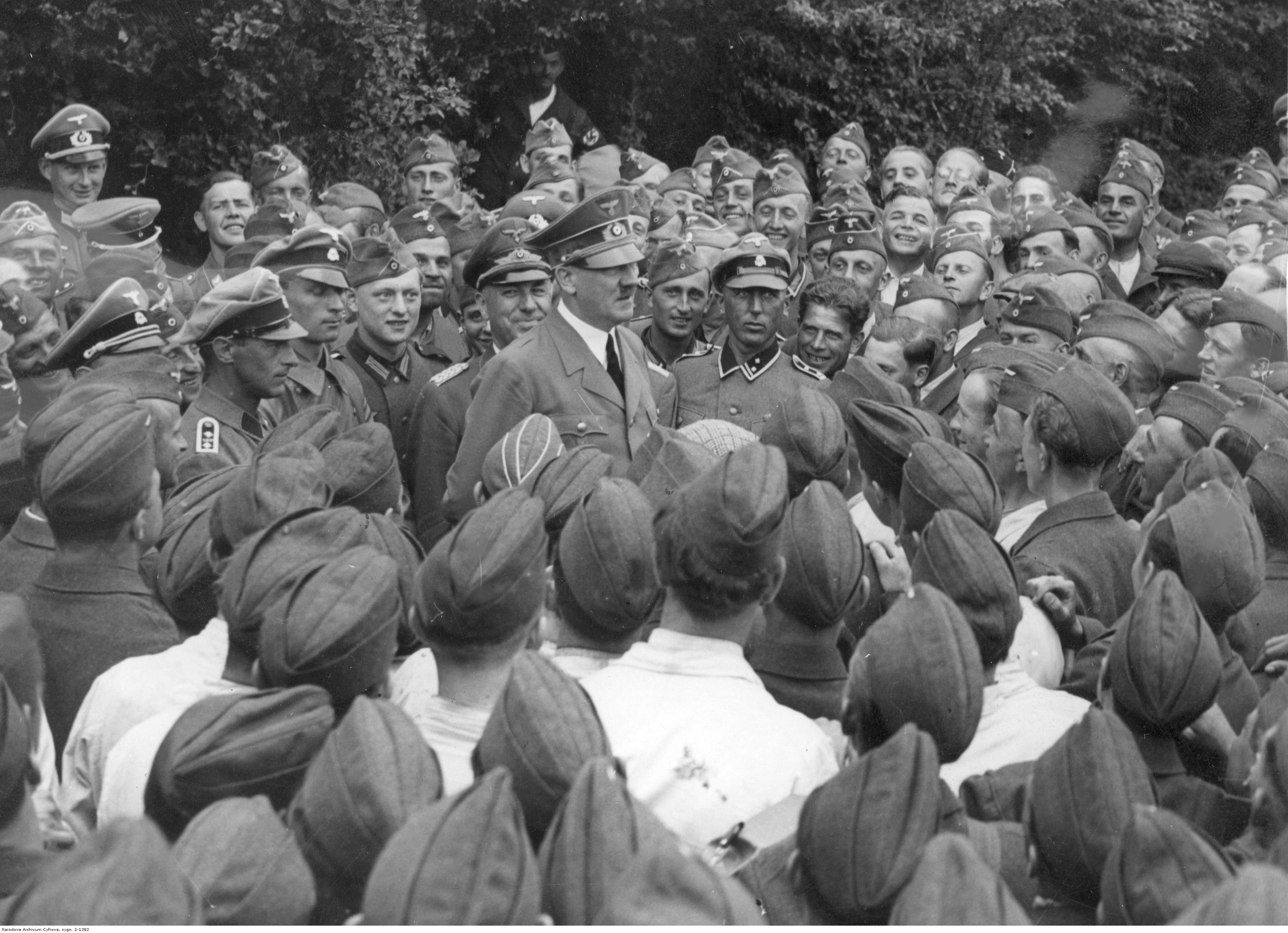
Adolf Hitler visiting Luftwaffe soldiers January 1943.

German day- and night-fighter pilots claimed more than 70,000 aerial victories during World War II. Of these, an estimated 745 victories were attributed to Messerschmitt Me 262 jet fighters. Flak shot down 25,000–30,000 Allied planes. Broken down according to the different Allied forces, about 25,000 were American planes, about 20,000 British, 46,100 Soviet, 1,274 French, 375 Polish, and 81 Dutch as well as aircraft from other Allied nationalities.

The highest-scoring day-fighter pilot was Erich Hartmann with 352 confirmed kills, of which all but 7 were on the Eastern front against the Soviets. The leading aces in the west were Hans-Joachim Marseille with 158 kills (most of which were against British Commonwealth forces in the Desert campaign), and Georg-Peter Eder with 56 kills of aircraft from the USAAF (of a total of 78). The most successful night-fighter pilot, Heinz-Wolfgang Schnaufer, is credited with 121 kills. 103 German fighter pilots shot down more than 100 enemy aircraft for a total of roughly 15,400 aerial victories. Roughly a further 360 pilots claimed between 40 and 100 aerial victories for round about 21,000 victories. Another 500 fighter pilots claimed between 20 and 40 victories for a total of 15,000 victories. Part of the reason German pilots scored such high victory totals was that they were in combat for the duration of the war-unlike the Allies, who rotated their flyers out of combat after a certain amount of time to recuperate or to impart their skills in training other pilots - German pilots flew until they were killed, captured, or too badly wounded to keep flying. It is relatively certain that 2,500 German fighter pilots attained ace status, having achieved at least five aerial victories. These achievements were honored with 453 German single and twin-engine (Messerschmitt Bf 110) day-fighter pilots receiving the Knight's Cross of the Iron Cross. Intense personal rivalry may have played an important role in motivating high-performing aces (who scored the vast majority of aerial victories). Public recognition in the form of medals and mentions in the army bulletin spurred efforts of peers who had previously flown with award-winners . 85 night-fighter pilots, including 14 crew members, were awarded the Knight's Cross. Some bomber pilots were also highly successful. Stuka and Schlachtflieger pilot Hans-Ulrich Rudel flew 2,530 ground-attack missions and claimed the destruction of more than 519 tanks and a battleship, among others. He became the most highly decorated German serviceman of the Second World War. Bomber pilot Hansgeorg Bätcher flew more than 658 combat missions, destroying numerous ships and other targets.

Luftwaffe losses, on the other hand, were high as well. The estimated total number of destroyed and damaged for the war totalled 76,875 aircraft. Of these, about 43,000 were lost in combat, the rest in operational accidents and during training. By type, losses totalled 21,452 fighters, 12,037 bombers, 15,428 trainers, 10,221 twin-engine fighters, 5,548 ground attack craft, 6,733 reconnaissance planes, and 6,141 transports.

According to the General Staff of the Wehrmacht the losses of the flight personnel until February 1945 amounted to:

	Officers	Enlisted
Killed in action	6,527	43,517
Wounded in action	4,194	27,811
Missing in action	4,361	27,240
Total	15,082	98,568

According to official statistics, total Luftwaffe casualties, including ground personnel, amounted to 138,596 killed and 156,132 missing through 31 January 1945.

== Omissions and failures ==
=== Lack of aerial defence ===
The failure of the Luftwaffe in the Defence of the Reich campaign was a result of a number of factors. The Luftwaffe lacked an effective air defence system early in the war. Hitler's foreign policy had pushed Germany into war before these defences could be fully developed. The Luftwaffe was forced to improvise and construct its defences during the war.

The daylight actions over German-controlled territory were sparse in 1939–1940. The responsibility of the defence of German air space fell to the Luftgaukommandos (air district commands). The defence systems relied mostly on the "flak" arm. The defences were not coordinated and communication was poor. This lack of understanding between the flak and flying branches of the defence would plague the Luftwaffe throughout the war. Hitler, in particular, wanted the defence to rest on anti-aircraft artillery as it gave the civilian population a "psychological crutch" no matter how ineffective the weapons.

Most of the battles fought by the Luftwaffe on the Western Front were against the RAF's "Circus" raids and the occasional daylight raid into German air space. This was a fortunate position since the Luftwaffe's strategy of focusing its striking power on one front started to unravel with the failure of the invasion of the Soviet Union. The "peripheral" strategy of the Luftwaffe between 1939 and 1940 had been to deploy its fighter defences at the edges of Axis occupied territory, with little protecting the inner depths. Moreover, the front line units in the West were complaining about the poor numbers and performance of aircraft. Units complained of lack of Zerstörer aircraft with all-weather capabilities and the "lack of climbing power of the Bf 109". The Luftwaffe's technical edge was slipping as the only formidable new aircraft in the German arsenal was the Focke-Wulf Fw 190. Milch was to assist Udet with aircraft production increases and the introduction of more modern types of fighter aircraft. However, they explained at a meeting of the Reich Industrial Council on 18 September 1941 that the new next-generation aircraft had failed to materialise, and production of obsolete types had to continue to meet the growing need for replacements.

The buildup of the Jagdwaffe ("Fighter Force") was too rapid and its quality suffered. It was not put under a unified command until 1943, which also affected the performance of the nine Jagdgeschwader fighter wings in existence in 1939. No further units were formed until 1942, and the years of 1940–1941 were wasted. The OKL failed to construct a strategy; instead, its command style was reactionary, and its measures not as effective without thorough planning. This was particularly apparent with the Sturmböck squadrons, formed to replace the increasingly ineffective twin-engined Zerstörer heavy fighter wings as the primary defence against USAAF daylight raids. The Sturmböcke flew Fw 190A fighters armed with heavy 20mm and 30mm cannon to destroy heavy bombers, but this increased the weight and affected the performance of the Fw 190 at a time when the aircraft were meeting large numbers of equal if not superior Allied types.

Daytime aerial defence against the USAAF's strongly defended heavy bomber forces, particularly the Eighth Air Force and the Fifteenth Air Force, had its successes through the calendar year of 1943. But at the start of 1944, Eighth AF commander Jimmy Doolittle made a major change in offensive fighter tactics, which defeated the Luftwaffe's day fighter force from that time onwards. Steadily increasing numbers of the superlative North American P-51 Mustang single-engine fighter, leading the USAAF's bombers into German airspace defeated first the Bf 110 Zerstörer wings, then the Fw 190A Sturmböcke.

=== Development and equipment ===
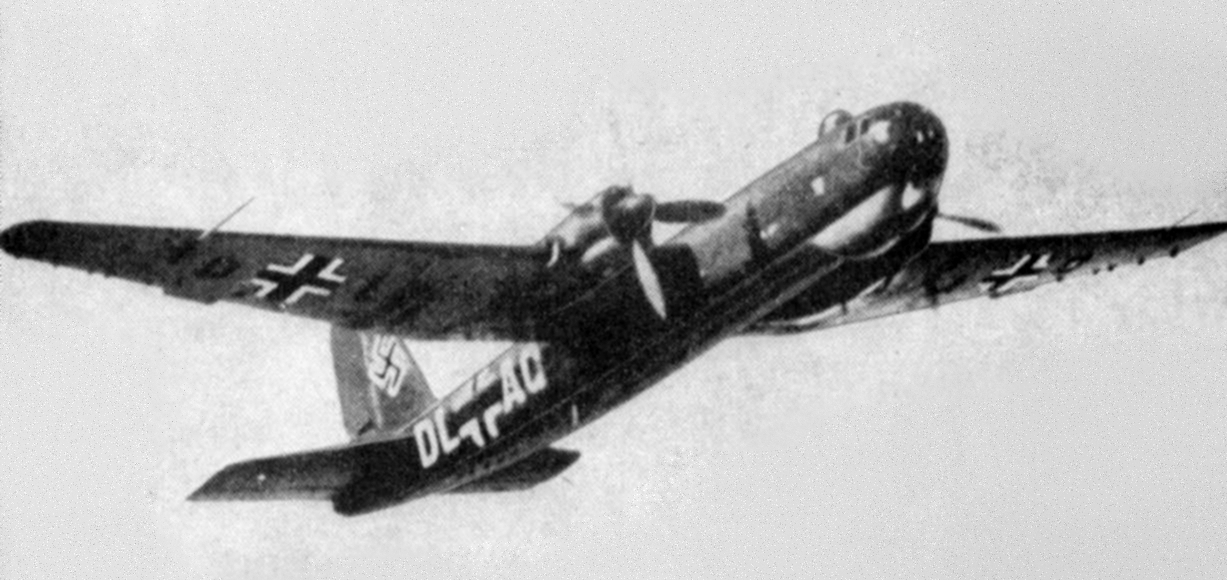
The most troublesome of all German designs during WWII – both in development and in service – was the He 177A Greif heavy bomber.

In terms of technological development, the failure to develop a long-range bomber and capable long-range fighters during this period left the Luftwaffe unable to conduct a meaningful strategic bombing campaign throughout the war. However, Germany at that time suffered from limitations in raw materials such as oil and aluminum, which meant that there were insufficient resources for much beyond a tactical air force: given these circumstances, the Luftwaffe's reliance on tactical mid-range, twin-engined medium bombers and short-range dive-bombers was a pragmatic choice of strategy. It might also be argued that the Luftwaffe's Kampfgeschwader medium and heavy bomber wings were perfectly capable of attacking strategic targets, but the lack of capable long-range escort fighters left the bombers unable to carry out their missions effectively against determined and well-organised fighter opposition.

The greatest failure for the Kampfgeschwader, however, was being saddled with an aircraft intended as a capable four-engined heavy bomber: the perpetually troubled Heinkel He 177, whose engines were prone to catch fire in flight. Of the three parallel proposals from the Heinkel engineering departments for a four-engined version of the A-series He 177 by February 1943, one of these being the Heinkel firm's Amerikabomber candidate, only one, the He 177B, emerged in the concluding months of 1943. Only three airworthy prototypes of the B-series He 177 design were produced by early 1944, by which point the Avro Lancaster, the most successful RAF heavy bomber, was already in widespread service.

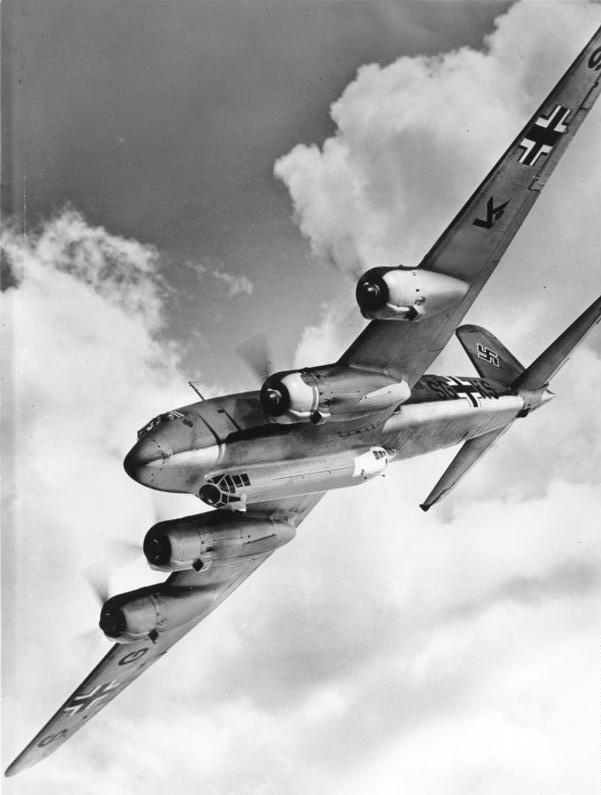
Arguably, one of the greatest tactical failures was the neglect of naval aviation in the western theatre, 1939–1941 (pictured is a Focke-Wulf Fw 200 C Condor).

Another failure of procurement and equipment was the lack of a dedicated naval air arm. Felmy had already expressed a desire to build a naval air arm to support Kriegsmarine operations in the Atlantic and British waters. Britain was dependent on food and raw materials from its Empire and North America. Felmy pressed this case firmly throughout 1938 and 1939, and, on 31 October 1939, Großadmiral Erich Raeder sent a strongly worded letter to Göring in support of such proposals. The early-war twin-engined Heinkel He 115 floatplane and Dornier Do 18 flying boat were too slow and short-ranged. The then-contemporary Blohm & Voss BV 138 Seedrache ("seadragon") flying boat became the Luftwaffe's primary seaborne maritime patrol platform, with nearly 300 examples built; it had a 4,300 km (2,700 mi) maximum range. Another Blohm und Voss design of 1940, the enormous, 46-meter wingspan Blohm & Voss BV 222 Wiking maritime patrol flying boat was capable of a 6,800 km (4,200 mi) range at maximum endurance. The Dornier Do 217 would have been ideal as a land-based choice but suffered production problems. Raeder also complained about the poor standard of aerial torpedoes, although their design was the responsibility of the Kriegsmarine, even considering production of the Japanese Type 91 torpedo used in the Attack on Pearl Harbor as the Lufttorpedo LT 850 by August 1942. (Note: see Yanagi missions and Heinkel He 111 torpedo bomber operations)

Without specialised naval or land-based, purpose-designed maritime patrol aircraft, the Luftwaffe was forced to improvise. The Focke-Wulf Fw 200 Condor – developed as a civilian airliner – lacked the structural strength for combat maneuvering at lower altitudes, making it unsuitable for use as a bomber in maritime patrol duties. The Condor lacked speed, armor and bomb load capacity. Sometimes the fuselage literally "broke its back" or a wing panel dropped loose from the wing root after a hard landing. Nevertheless, it was adapted for the long-range reconnaissance and anti-shipping roles and, between August 1940 and February 1941, Fw 200s sank 85 vessels for a claimed total of 363,000 GRT. Had the Luftwaffe focused on naval aviation – particularly maritime patrol aircraft with long range, Germany might well have been in a position to win the Battle of the Atlantic. However, Raeder and the Kriegsmarine failed to press for naval air power until the war began, mitigating the Luftwaffe's responsibility. At the same time Göring regarded any other branch of the German military developing its own aviation as an encroachment on his authority and continually frustrated the navy's attempts to build its own airpower.

The absence of a strategic bomber force for the Luftwaffe, following Wever's death in 1936 and the end of the Ural bomber programme was not addressed until the authorisation of the "Bomber B" design competition in July 1939, which sought to replace the medium bomber force with which the Luftwaffe would begin the war, and the partly achieved Schnellbomber high-speed medium bomber concept with more advanced, twin-engined high-speed bomber aircraft fitted with pairs of relatively "high-power" engines of 1,500 kW (2,000 hp) and upwards as a follow-on to the earlier Schnellbomber project, that would also be able to function as shorter-range heavy bombers.

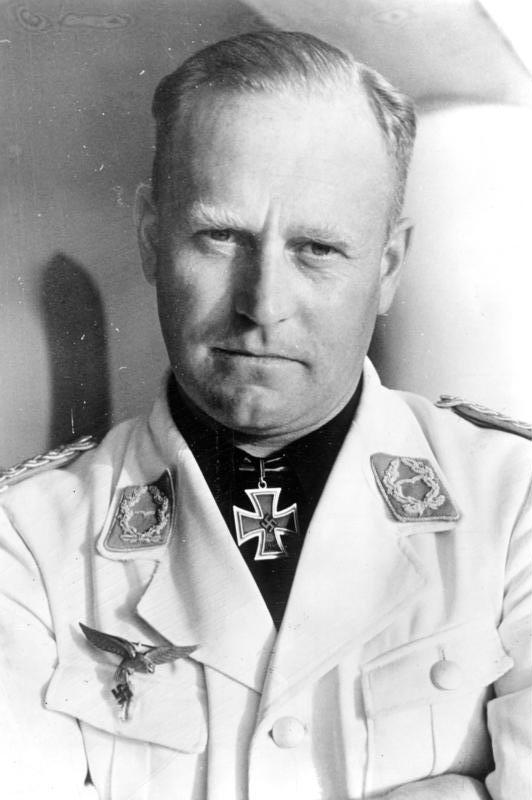
Oberst Edgar Petersen, head of the Luftwaffe's Erprobungsstellen network of test facilities late in the war

The spring 1942 Amerikabomber programme sought to produce strategic bomber designs for the Luftwaffe to directly attack the United States from Europe or the Azores. Inevitably, both the Bomber B and Amerikabomber programmes were victims of the continued emphasis of the Wehrmacht combined military's insistence for its Luftwaffe air arm to support the Heer as its primary mission, and the damage to the German aviation industry from Allied bomber attacks.

==== Challenges in directly addressing combat pilots' issues ====
The RLM's apparent lack of a dedicated "technical-tactical" department, that would have directly been in contact with combat pilots to assess their needs for weaponry upgrades and tactical advice, had never been seriously envisioned as a critically ongoing necessity in the planning of the original German air arm. The RLM did have its own Technisches Amt (T-Amt) department to handle aviation technology issues, but this was tasked with handling all aviation technology issues in Nazi Germany, both military and civilian in nature, and also not known to have ever had any clear and actively administrative and consultative links with the front-line forces established for such purposes. On the front-line combat side of the issue, and for direct contact with the German aviation firms making the Luftwaffe's warplanes, the Luftwaffe did have its own reasonably effective system of four military aviation test facilities, or Erprobungstellen located at three coastal sites – Peenemünde-West (also incorporating a separate facility in nearby Karlshagen), Tarnewitz and Travemünde – and the central inland site of Rechlin, itself first established as a military airfield in late August 1918 by the German Empire, with the four-facility system commanded later in World War II by Oberst Edgar Petersen. However, due to lack of co-ordination between the RLM and the OKL, all fighter and bomber development was oriented toward short-range aircraft, as they could be produced in greater numbers, rather than quality long-range aircraft, something that put the Luftwaffe at a disadvantage as early as the Battle of Britain. The "ramp-up" to production levels required to fulfill the Luftwaffe's front-line needs was also slow, not reaching maximum output until 1944.

Production of fighters was not given priority until the Emergency Fighter Program was begun in 1944; Adolf Galland commented that this should have occurred at least a year earlier. Galland also pointed to the mistakes and challenges made in the development of the Messerschmitt Me 262 including the protracted development time required for its Junkers Jumo 004 jet engines to achieve reliability. German combat aircraft types that were first designed and flown in the mid-1930s had become obsolete, yet were kept in production, in particular the Ju 87 Stuka, and the Bf 109, because there were no well-developed replacement designs.

=== Production failures ===
The failure of German production was evident from the start of the Battle of Britain. By the end of 1940, the Luftwaffe had suffered heavy losses and needed to regroup. Deliveries of new aircraft were insufficient to meet the drain on resources; the Luftwaffe, unlike the RAF, was failing to expand its pilot and aircraft numbers. This was partly owing to production planning failures before the war and the demands of the army. Nevertheless, the German aircraft industry was being outproduced in 1940. In terms of fighter aircraft production, the British exceeded their production plans by 43%, while the Germans remained 40% "behind" target by summer 1940. In fact, German production in fighters fell from 227 to 177 per month between July and September 1940. One of the many reasons for the failure of the Luftwaffe in 1940 was that it did not have the operational and material means to destroy the British aircraft industry, something that the much-anticipated Bomber B design competition was intended to address.

The so-called "Göring programme", had largely been predicated on the defeat of the Soviet Union in 1941. After the Wehrmacht's failure in front of Moscow, industrial priorities for a possibility in increasing aircraft production were largely abandoned in favor to support the army's increased attrition rates and heavy equipment losses. Milch's reforms expanded production rates. In 1941 an average of 981 aircraft (including 311 fighters) were produced each month. In 1942 this rose to 1,296 aircraft of which 434 were fighters. Milch's planned production increases were initially opposed. But in June, he was granted materials for 900 fighters per month as the average output. By the summer of 1942, the Luftwaffe's operational force had recovered from a low of 39% (44% for fighters and 31% for bombers) in the winter of 1941–1942, to 69% by late June (75% for fighters and 66% for bombers) in 1942. However, after increased commitments in the east, overall operational ready rates fluctuated between 59% and 65% for the remaining year. Throughout 1942 the Luftwaffe was out produced in fighter aircraft by 250% and in twin-engine aircraft by 196%.

The appointment of Albert Speer as Minister of Armaments increased production of existing designs and the few new designs that had originated from earlier in the war. However, the intensification of Allied bombing caused the dispersion of production and prevented an efficient acceleration of expansion. German aviation production reached about 36,000 combat aircraft for 1944. However, by the time this was achieved the Luftwaffe lacked the fuel and trained pilots to make this achievement worthwhile.

The failure to maximise production immediately after the failures in the Soviet Union and North Africa ensured the Luftwaffe's effective defeat in the period of September 1943 – February 1944. Despite the tactical victories won, they failed to achieve a decisive victory. By the time production reached acceptable levels, as so many other factors had for the Luftwaffe – and for the entire Wehrmacht's weapons and ordnance technology as a whole – late in the war, it was "too little, too late".

=== Engine development ===
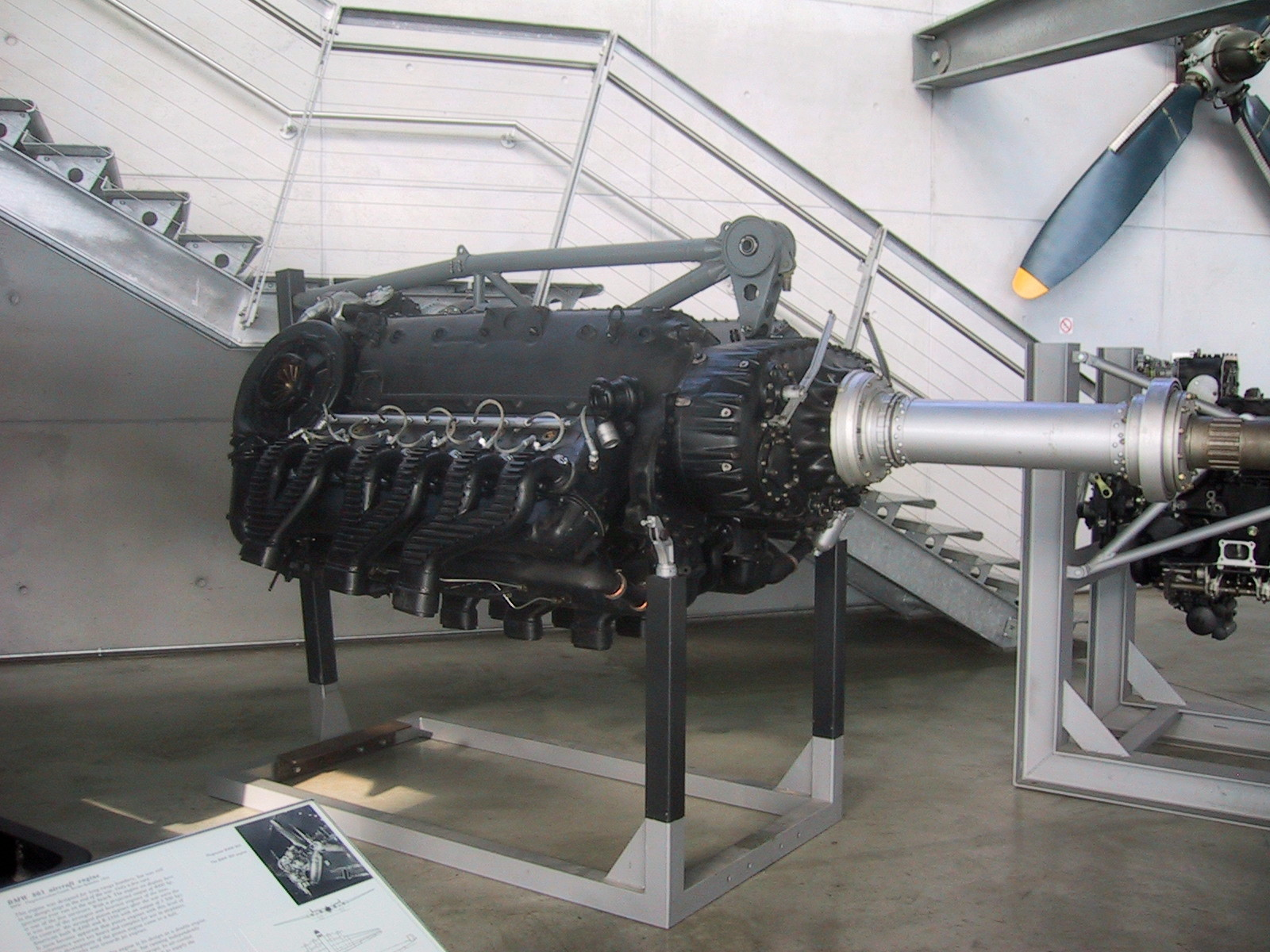
A restored DB 610 "power system" engine, comprising a pair of DB 605 inverted V12s – the top of its central space-frame motor-mount structure can be seen.

By the late 1930s, airframe construction methods had progressed to the point where airframes could be built to any required size, especially in Germany with aircraft like the Dornier Do X flying boat and the Junkers G 38 airliner. However, powering such designs was a major challenge. Mid-1930s aero engines were limited to about 600 hp and the first 1000 hp engines were just entering the prototype stage – for Nazi Germany's then-new Luftwaffe air arm, this meant liquid-cooled inverted V12 designs like the Daimler-Benz DB 601.

Nazi Germany's initial need for substantially more powerful aviation engines originated with the private venture Heinkel He 119 high-speed reconnaissance design, and the Messerschmitt Me 261 for maritime reconnaissance duties. To give enough power in each engine installation, Daimler-Benz coupled two DB 601 engines as single "power system" with the propeller gear reduction housing across the front ends of the two engines. The combined powerplant, known as the DB 606, gave 2,700 metric horsepower (2,000 kW) maximum output in February 1937, for a total weight of around 1.5 tonnes.

Daimler-Benz's was at the same time developing a 1,500 kW class X-configuration engine design resulting in the twenty-four cylinder Daimler-Benz DB 604 (four banks of six cylinders each). Possessing essentially the same displacement of 46.5 litres (2,840 in^{3}) as the initial version of the liquid-cooled Junkers Jumo 222 multibank engine, six banks of four inline cylinders apiece instead; coincidentally, both the original Jumo 222 design and the DB 604 each weighed about a third less (at some 1,080 kilograms or 2,380 pounds of dry weight) than the DB 606. The DB 604's protracted development was diverting valuable German aviation powerplant research resources, and with more development of the "twinned-DB 605" based DB 610 coupled engine (itself initiated in June 1940 with a top output level of 2,950 PS (2,170 kW), and brought together in the same way – with the same all-up weight of 1.5 tonnes – as the DB 606 had been) giving improved results at the time, the Reich Air Ministry stopped all work on the DB 604 in September 1942. Such "coupled powerplants" were the exclusive choice of power for the Heinkel He 177A Greif heavy bomber, mistasked from its beginnings in being intended to do moderate-angle "dive bombing" for a 30-meter wingspan class, heavy bomber design – the twin nacelles for a pair of DB 606s or 610s did reduce drag for such a combat "requirement", but the poor design of the He 177A's engine accommodations for these twin-crankcase "power systems" caused repeated outbreaks of engine fires, causing the "dive bombing" requirement for the He 177A to be cancelled by mid-September 1942.

BMW worked on what was essentially an enlarged version of its highly successful BMW 801 design from the Focke-Wulf Fw 190A. This led to the 53.7-litre displacement BMW 802 in 1943, an eighteen-cylinder air-cooled radial, weighing 1,530 kg (3,370 lb) matching that of the 24-cylinder liquid-cooled inline DB 606; and the even larger, 83.5-litre displacement BMW 803 28-cylinder liquid-cooled radial, which from post-war statements from BMW development personnel were each considered to be "secondary priority" development programmes at best. This situation with the 802 and 803 designs led to the company's engineering personnel being redirected to place all efforts on improving the 801 to develop it to its full potential. The BMW 801F radial development, through its use of features coming from the 801E subtype, was able to substantially exceed the over-1,500 kW output level.

The twinned-up Daimler-Benz DB 601-based, 1,750 kW output DB 606, and its more powerful descendant, the 2,130 kW output DB 605-based DB 610, weighing some 1.5 tonnes apiece, were the only 1,500 kW-plus output level aircraft powerplants to ever be produced by Germany for Luftwaffe combat aircraft, mostly for the Heinkel He 177A heavy bomber. Even the largest-displacement inverted V12 aircraft powerplant built in Germany, the 44.52-litre (2,717 cu. in.) Daimler-Benz DB 603, which saw widespread use in twin-engined designs, could not exceed 1,500 kW output without more development. By March 1940, even the DB 603 was being "twinned-up" as the 601/606 and 605/610 had been, to become their replacement "power system": this was the strictly experimental, approximately 1.8-tonne weight apiece, twin-crankcase DB 613; capable of over 2,570 kW (3,495 PS) output, but which never left its test phase.

The proposed over-1,500 kW output subtypes of German aviation industry's existing piston aviation engine designs—which adhered to using just a single crankcase that were able to substantially exceed the aforementioned over-1,500 kW output level—were the DB 603 LM (1,800 kW at take-off, in production), the DB 603 N (2,205 kW at take-off, planned for 1946) and the BMW 801F (1,765 kW (2,400 PS) engines. The pioneering nature of jet engine technology in the 1940s resulted in numerous development problems for both of Germany's major jet engine designs to see mass production, the Jumo 004 and BMW 003 (both axial flow designs), with the more powerful Heinkel HeS 011 never leaving the test phase.

=== Personnel and leadership ===
The bomber arm was given preference and received the "better" pilots. Later, fighter pilot leaders were few in numbers as a result of this. As with the late shift to fighter production, the Luftwaffe pilot schools did not give the fighter pilot schools preference soon enough. The Luftwaffe, the OKW argued, was still an offensive weapon, and its primary focus was on producing bomber pilots. This attitude prevailed until the second half of 1943. During the Defence of the Reich campaign in 1943 and 1944, there were not enough commissioned fighter pilots and leaders to meet attrition rates; as the need arose to replace aircrew (as attrition rates increased), the quality of pilot training deteriorated rapidly. Later this was made worse by fuel shortages for pilot training caused by the Allied strategic bombing campaign against German oil production. Overall this meant reduced training on operational types, formation flying, gunnery training, and combat training, and a total lack of instrument training.

At the beginning of the war, commanders were replaced with younger commanders too quickly. These younger commanders had to learn "in the field" rather than entering a front-line post fully qualified. Training of formation leaders was not systematic until 1943, which was far too late, with the Luftwaffe already stretched. The Luftwaffe thus lacked a cadre of staff officers to set up new combat units with carefully selected and skilled combat personnel, and pass on experience.

Moreover, Luftwaffe leadership from the start poached the training command, which undermined its ability to replace losses, while also planning for "short sharp campaigns", which did not pertain. Moreover, no plans were laid for night fighters. In fact, when protests were raised, Hans Jeschonnek, Chief of the General Staff of the Luftwaffe, said, "First we've got to beat Russia, then we can start training!"

== Luftwaffe ground forces ==
The Luftwaffe was unusual among contemporary independent air forces in possessing an organic paratrooper force called Fallschirmjäger. Established in 1938, they were deployed in parachute operations in 1940 and 1941 and participated in the Battle of Fort Eben-Emael and the Battle for The Hague (alongside the German Army's 22nd Air Landing Division) in May 1940, and en masse during the Battle of Crete in May 1941. However, more than 4,000 Fallschirmjäger were killed during the Crete operation. The associated losses of aircraft and the belief that paratroops no longer enjoyed the advantage of surprise led to reduction in airborne operations. Afterwards, although continuing to be trained in parachute delivery, paratroopers were only used in a parachute role for smaller-scale operations, such as the rescue of Benito Mussolini in 1943. Fallschirmjäger formations were mainly used as light infantry in all theatres of the war. Their losses up to February 1945 were 22,041 killed, 57,594 wounded and 44,785 missing.

During 1942 surplus Luftwaffe personnel was used to form Luftwaffe Field Divisions, standard infantry divisions that were used chiefly as rear echelon units to free up front line troops. From 1943, the Luftwaffe also had an armoured division called Fallschirm-Panzer Division 1 Hermann Göring, which was expanded to a Panzerkorps in 1944.

Ground support and combat units from the Reichsarbeitsdienst (RAD), the Luftschutzpolizei (LSP), the National Socialist Flyers Corps (NSFK), and the National Socialist Motor Corps (NSKK) were also put at the Luftwaffe's disposal during the war. In 1942 56 RAD companies served with the Luftwaffe in the West as airfield construction troops. In 1943 420 RAD companies were trained as crews of anti-aircraft artillery (AAA) and posted to existing Luftwaffe AAA battalions in the homeland. At the end of the war, these units were also fighting Allied tanks. Beginning in 1939 with a transport regiment, the NSKK had in 1942 a complete division-sized transportation unit serving the Luftwaffe, the NSKK Transportgruppe Luftwaffe serving in France and at the Eastern front. The overwhelming number of its 12,000 members were Belgian, Dutch, and French collaborators.

== War crimes ==
=== Forced labour ===
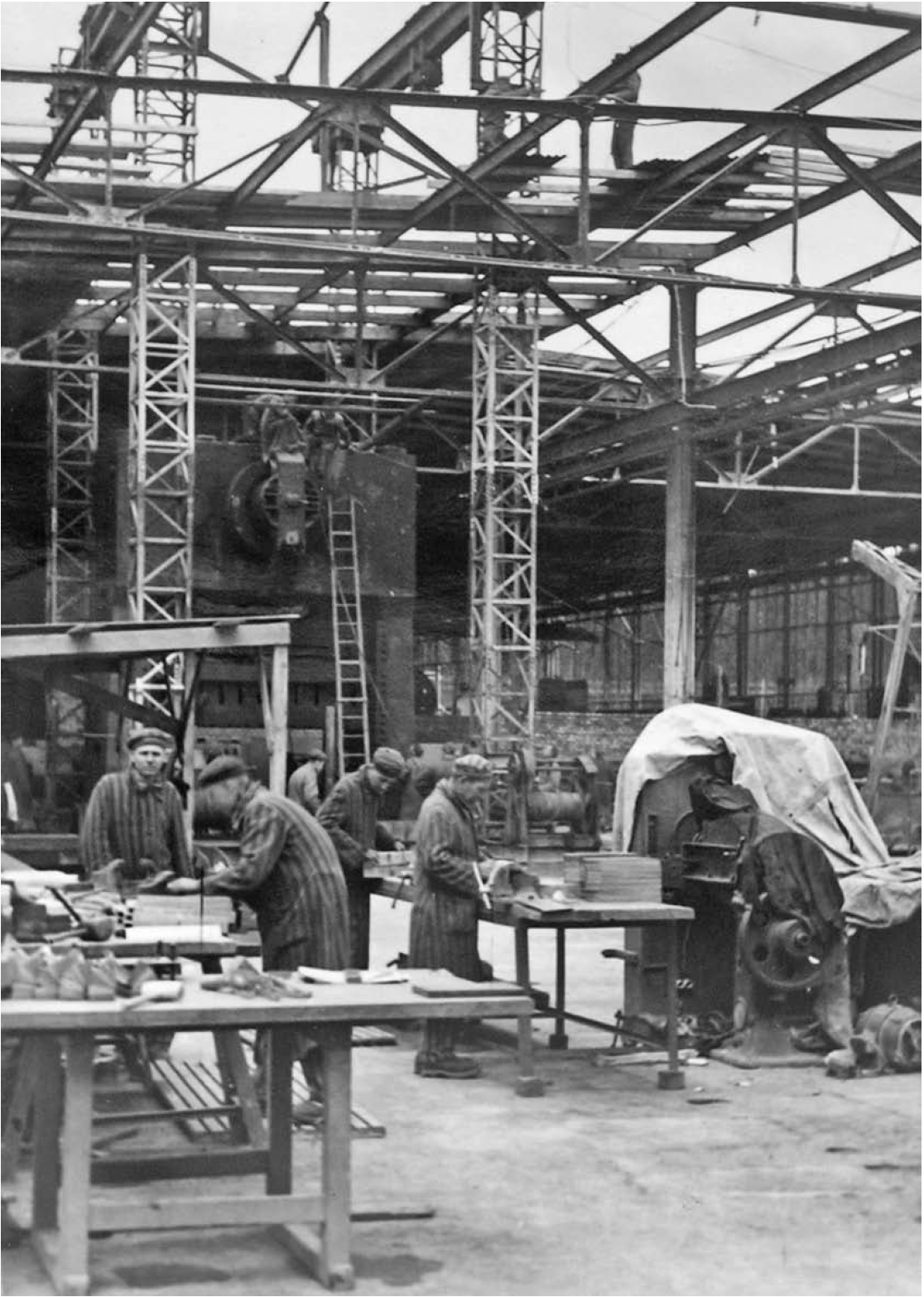
Concentration camp prisoners forced to work at a Messerschmitt aircraft factory

In 1943 and 1944, aircraft production was moved to concentration camps in order to alleviate labour shortages and to protect production from Allied air raids. The two largest aircraft factories in Germany were located at Mauthausen-Gusen and Mittelbau-Dora concentration camps. Aircraft parts were also manufactured at Flossenbürg, Buchenwald, Dachau, Ravensbrück, Gross-Rosen, Natzweiler, Herzogenbusch, and Neuengamme. In 1944 and 1945, as many as 90,000 concentration prisoners worked in the aviation industry, and were about one tenth of the concentration camp population over the winter of 1944–45. Partly in response to the Luftwaffe's demand for more forced labourers to increase fighter production, the concentration camp more than doubled between mid-1943 (224,000) and mid-1944 (524,000). Part of this increase was due to the deportation of Hungarian Jews; the Jägerstab programme was used to justify the deportations to the Hungarian government. Of the 437,000 Hungarian Jews deported between May and July 1944, about 320,000 were gassed on arrival at Auschwitz and the remainder forced to work. Only 50,000 survived.

Almost 1,000 fuselages of the jet fighter Messerschmitt Me 262 were produced at Gusen, a subcamp of Mauthausen and a brutal labour camp, where the average life expectancy was six months. By 1944, one-third of production at the crucial Regensburg plant that produced the Bf 109, the backbone of the Luftwaffe fighter arm, originated in Gusen and Flossenbürg alone. Synthetic oil was produced from shale oil deposits by prisoners of Mittlebau-Dora as part of Operation Desert directed by Edmund Geilenberg in order to make up for the decrease in oil production due to Allied bombing. For oil production, three subcamps were constructed and 15,000 prisoners forced to work in the plant. More than 3,500 people died. Vaivara concentration camp in Estonia was also established for shale oil extraction; about 20,000 prisoners worked there and more than 1,500 died at Vaivara.

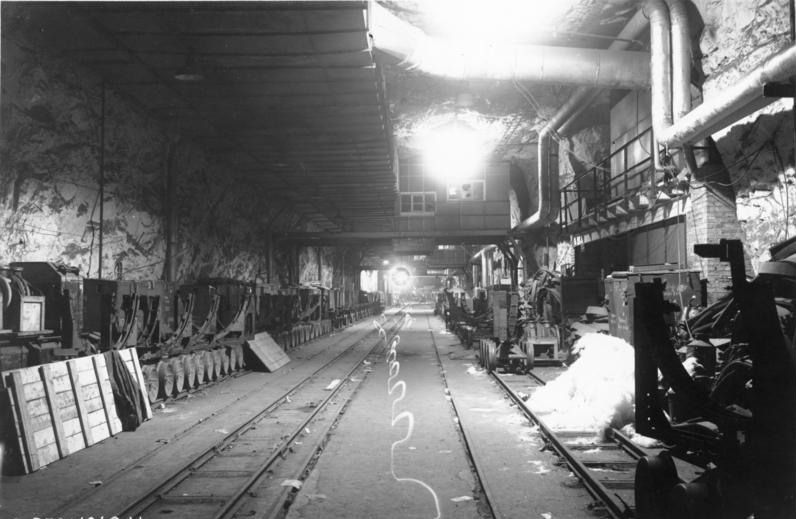
Manufacturing of V-1 cruise missiles and V-2 rockets in the Mittelwerk tunnels resulted in the deaths of more than 12,000 people.

Luftwaffe airfields were frequently maintained using forced labour. Thousands of inmates from five subcamps of Stutthof worked on the airfields. Airfields and bases near several other concentration camps (Note: Buchenwald, Dachau, Flossenbürg, Gross-Rosen, Herzogenbusch, and Hinzert) and ghettos (Note: Krewo ghetto, Baranowicze ghetto, and Stołpce ghetto) were constructed or maintained by prisoners. On the orders of the Luftwaffe, prisoners from Buchenwald and Herzogenbusch were forced to defuse bombs that had fallen around Düsseldorf and Leeuwarden respectively.

Thousands of Luftwaffe personnel worked as concentration camp guards. Auschwitz included a munitions factory guarded by Luftwaffe soldiers; 2,700 Luftwaffe personnel worked as guards at Buchenwald. Dozens of camps and subcamps were staffed primarily by Luftwaffe soldiers. (Note: See Luftwaffe guards at concentration camps for a full list.) According to the Encyclopedia of Camps and Ghettos, it was typical for camps devoted to armaments production to be run by the branch of the Wehrmacht that used the products. In 1944, many Luftwaffe soldiers were transferred to concentration camps to alleviate personnel shortages.

=== Massacres ===
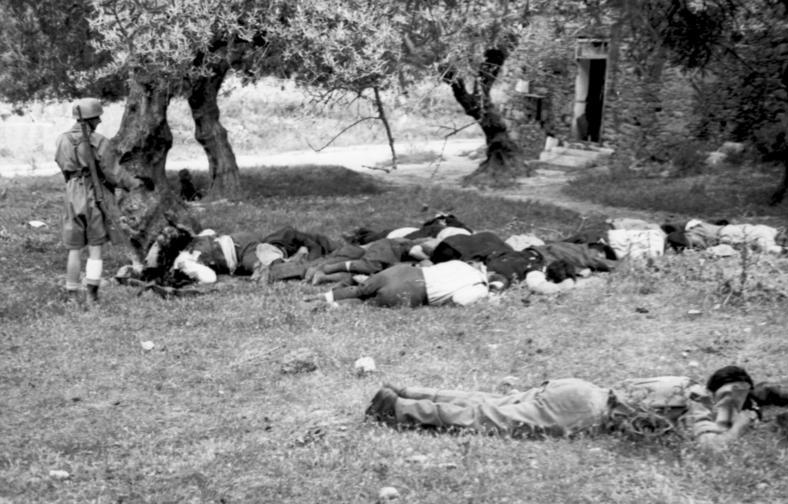
Civilians murdered by Luftwaffe paratroopers in Kondomari, Crete

Luftwaffe paratroopers committed many war crimes in Crete following the Battle of Crete, including the Alikianos executions, the Massacre of Kondomari, and the Razing of Kandanos. Several Luftwaffe divisions, including the 1st Parachute Division, 2nd Parachute Division, 4th Parachute Division, 19th Luftwaffe Field Division, 20th Luftwaffe Field Division and the 1st Fallschirm-Panzer Division, committed war crimes in Italy, murdering hundreds of civilians.

Luftwaffe troops participated in the murder of Jews imprisoned in ghettos in Eastern Europe. For example, they assisted in the murder of 2,680 Jews at the Nemirov ghetto, participated in a series of massacres at the Opoczno ghetto, and helped to liquidate the Dęblin–Irena Ghetto by deporting thousands of Jews to Treblinka extermination camp. Between 1942 and 1944, two Luftwaffe security battalions were stationed in the Białowieża Forest for Bandenbekämpfung (Note: Literally "bandit fighting", the word referred to ethnic cleansing and genocide under the guise of anti-partisan warfare.) operations. Encouraged by Göring, they murdered thousands of Jews and other civilians. Luftwaffe soldiers frequently executed Polish civilians at random with baseless accusations of being "Bolshevik agents", in order to keep the population in line, or as reprisal for partisan activities. The performance of the troops was measured by the body count of people murdered. 10,000 Luftwaffe troops were stationed on the Eastern Front for such "anti-partisan" operations.

=== Human experimentation ===
Throughout the war, concentration camp prisoners were forced to serve as human subjects in testing Luftwaffe equipment. Some of these experiments were carried out by Luftwaffe personnel and others were performed by the SS on the orders of the OKL.

In 1941, experiments with the intent of discovering how to prevent and treat hypothermia were carried out for the Luftwaffe, which had lost aircrew to immersion hypothermia after ditchings. The experiments were conducted at Dachau and Auschwitz. Sigmund Rascher, a Luftwaffe doctor based at Dachau, published the results at the 1942 medical conference entitled "Medical Problems Arising from Sea and Winter". Of about 400 prisoners forced to participate in cold-water experiments, 80 to 90 were killed.

In early 1942, prisoners at Dachau were used by Rascher in experiments to perfect ejection seats at high altitudes. A low-pressure chamber containing these prisoners was used to simulate conditions at altitudes of up to 20,000 metres (66,000 ft). It was rumored that Rascher performed vivisections on the brains of victims who survived the initial experiment. Of the 200 subjects, 80 died from the experimentation, and the others were executed. Eugen Hagen, head doctor of the Luftwaffe, infected inmates of Natzweiler concentration camp with typhus in order to test the efficacy of proposed vaccines.

=== Aerial bombing of non-military targets ===
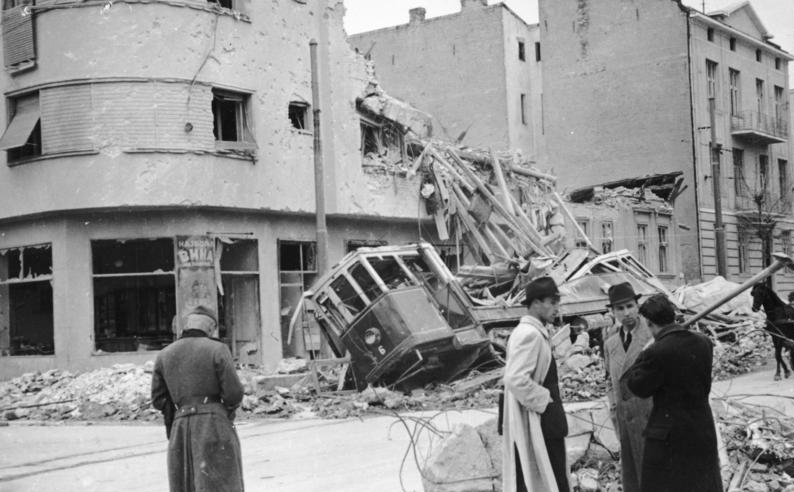
Bomb-damaged buildings in Belgrade in April 1941

No positive or specific customary international humanitarian law with respect to aerial warfare existed prior to or during World War II. This is also why no Luftwaffe officers were prosecuted at the post-World War II Allied war crime trials for the aerial raids.

The bombing of Wieluń was an air raid on the Polish town of Wieluń by the Luftwaffe on 1 September 1939. The Luftwaffe started bombing Wieluń at 04:40, five minutes before the shelling of Westerplatte, which has traditionally been considered the beginning of World War II in Europe. The air raid on the town was one of the first aerial bombings of the war. About 1,300 civilians were killed, hundreds were injured, and 90 percent of the town centre was destroyed. The casualty rate was more than twice as high as Guernica. A 1989 Sender Freies Berlin documentary stated that there were no military or industrial targets in the area, except for a small sugar factory in the outskirts of the town. Furthermore, Trenkner stated that German bombers first destroyed the town's hospital. Two attempts, in 1978 and 1983, to prosecute individuals for the bombing of the Wieluń hospital were dismissed by West German judges when prosecutors stated that the pilots had been unable to make out the nature of the structure due to fog.

Operation Retribution was the April 1941 German bombing of Belgrade, the capital of Yugoslavia. The bombing deliberately targeted the killing of civilians as punishment and resulted in 17,000 civilian deaths. It occurred in the first days of the German-led Axis invasion of Yugoslavia. The operation commenced on 6 April and concluded on 7 or 8 April, resulting in the paralysis of Yugoslav civilian and military command and control, widespread destruction in the centre of the city and many civilian casualties. Following the Yugoslav capitulation, Luftwaffe engineers conducted a bomb damage assessment in Belgrade. The report stated that 218.5 metric tons (215.0 long tons; 240.9 short tons) of bombs were dropped, with 10 to 14 percent being incendiaries. It listed all the targets of the bombing, which included: the royal palace, the war ministry, military headquarters, the central post office, the telegraph office, passenger and goods railway stations, power stations, and barracks. It also mentioned that seven aerial mines were dropped and that areas in the centre and northwest of the city had been destroyed, comprising 20 to 25 percent of its total area. Some aspects of the bombing remain unexplained, particularly the use of aerial mines. In contrast, Pavlowitch states that almost 50 percent of housing in Belgrade was destroyed. After the invasion, the Germans forced between 3,500 and 4,000 Jews to collect rubble that was caused by the bombing.

The biggest attacks at civilian targets occurred in the Battle of Britain when the Luftwaffe attacked the British Isles and primarily hit non military targets. This resulted in over 22,000 civilians being killed and over 30,000 being wounded.

=== Trials ===
Several prominent Luftwaffe commanders were convicted of war crimes, including General Alexander Löhr and Field Marshal Albert Kesselring.

== See also ==
- Der Adler, Luftwaffe's propaganda magazine
- Emergency Fighter Program
- German Air Fleets in World War II
- List of flags of the Luftwaffe (1933–45)
- List of German aircraft projects, 1939–45
- List of German World War II jet aces
- List of German World War II night fighter aces
- List of Luftwaffe personnel convicted of war crimes
- List of weapons of military aircraft of Germany during World War II
- List of World War II aces from Germany
- List of World War II military aircraft of Germany
- Luftwaffe serviceable aircraft strengths (1940–45)
- Luftnachrichten Abteilung 350 – the Luftwaffe signal intelligence organization
- Military Ranks of the Luftwaffe (1935–45)
- Milch Trial
- Uniforms of the Luftwaffe (1935–45)
