= Kampfgruppe =

German term for combat formations in WWI and WWII

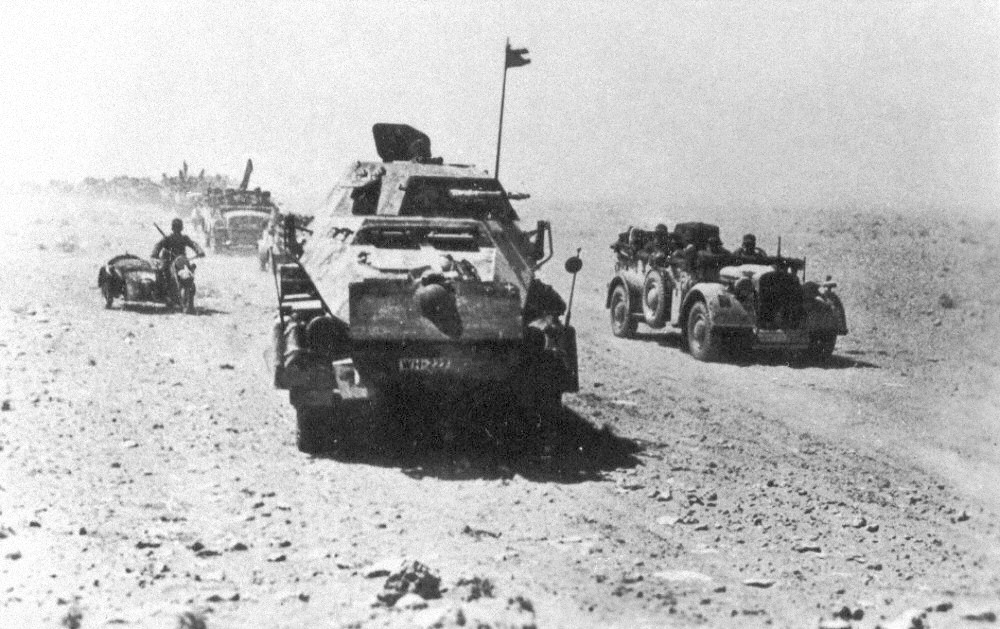
The Panzerjäger-Abteilung 39 (part of "Kampfgruppe Gräf", from the 21st Panzer Division) of the Afrika Korps on the move. The vehicles are a Sd.Kfz. 231 8-rad and motorcycle sidecar combination.

In military history, the German term Kampfgruppe (pl. Kampfgruppen; abbrev. KG, or KGr in Luftwaffe usage during World War II, literally "fighting group" or "battlegroup") can refer to a combat formation of any kind, but most usually to that employed by the Wehrmacht of Nazi Germany and its allies during World War II, and, to a lesser extent, the German Empire in World War I.

It also referred to bomber groups in Luftwaffe usage, which themselves consisted of three or four Staffeln (squadrons), and usually (but not exclusively) existed within Kampfgeschwader bomber wings of three or four Kampfgruppen per wing.

== Nature ==
The Kampfgruppe was an ad hoc combined arms formation, usually employing a combination of tanks, infantry, and artillery (including anti-tank) elements, generally organised for a particular task or operation. (Note: While the word Kampfgruppe in German literally refers to any battlegroup, the modern usage in the English-speaking world is restricted to World War II. Kampfgruppen in World War I lacked the panzer component, and, as such, were closer to the original meaning of the word.)

A Kampfgruppe could range in size from a company to a corps, but the most common was an Abteilung (battalion)-sized formation. Kampfgruppen were generally referred to by either their commanding officer's name or the parent division.

== World War I ==
The Stormtroopers (in German Stoßtruppen, shock troops, literally "punch/push troops") were specialist military troops which were formed in the last years of World War I as the German army developed new methods of attacking enemy trenches, called "infiltration tactics". Men trained in these methods were known in German as Sturmmann (literally "assault man" but usually translated as Stormtrooper), formed into companies of Sturmtruppen (Storm Troops). Other armies have also used the term "assault troops", "shock troops" or fire teams for specialist soldiers who perform the infiltration tasks of stormtroopers.

== Early World War II ==
With respect to their ad hoc nature and objective-oriented strategy, Finnish ski troops employed during the Soviet-Finnish Winter War of 1939-1940 could, in principle, be considered an equivalent to Kampfgruppen. However, given the poor equipment of the Finnish forces, the combined-arms aspect of the Kampfgruppen could not have been applied. In the Continuation War (1941–1944), battlegroups (Finnish: taisteluosasto) were commonly used by Finns and were bigger, having infantry, artillery, and anti-tank units. In many cases, there were several units of different regiments, brigades, and divisions in the same battlegroup. For instance in June 1944, Battlegroup Ehrnrooth (commander of 7th Regiment) consisted of I/7th Regiment, III/7th Regiment, III/6th Regiment (minus its 9th infantry company), fortification battalion 4, II/field artillery Regiment 19, light field artillery battalion 24, heavy artillery battalion 20, and heavy artillery battalion 27. For few days, regiment commander had more firepower under his command than any ordinary infantry division commander. Finnish battlegroups were relatively short-period ad hoc, but very common phenomena, especially in 1941 and 1944. Field artillery and anti-aircraft artillery units created their own artillery battlegroups.

== Late World War II ==
Hundreds of Kampfgruppen are documented to have taken part in operations ranging from a few days to over a year during the war. They left a significant impact in the popular culture and the picture of the Second World War. Famous examples include:

- Kampfgruppe Peiper was a mechanised brigade-sized formation formed under the command of SS-Standartenführer Joachim Peiper, which took part in the 1944 Battle of the Bulge. KG Peiper was to be the striking arm of the 1st SS Panzer Division Leibstandarte SS Adolf Hitler.
- Kampfgruppe Das Reich was a regiment-sized formation formed from the remaining combat-ready elements of the 2nd SS Panzer Division Das Reich, which was encircled in the Kamenets-Podolsky pocket in early 1944.
- Kampfgruppe 1001 Nacht was a German Kampfgruppe formed on the Oder front during the final German offensive of the Second World War. The formation is most notable for its unusual title, referring to the medieval Persian book of 1,001 Nights, a collection of tales and fables.
- During the Allied invasion of France, Major Hans von Luck took command of the 125th Panzergrenadier Regiment of the 21st Panzer Division, stationed near Caen, France.

=== Panzerkampfgruppe (late war) ===
A Panzerkampfgruppe was effectively the main striking force of a Panzer division. The usual Panzerkampfgruppe organization consisted of one tank battalion, one Panzergrenadier battalion, and one self-propelled artillery battalion, for a well rounded mobile fighting force. A mobile engineer company was often attached to the Panzerkampfgruppe.

=== Flak-Kampftrupps (late war) ===
Flak-Kampftrupps were mixed units which combined two or more heavy Flak pieces and light autocannons.

=== Other services ===
While the original concept of Kampfgruppe is usually reserved to the land warfare, some German tacticians and strategists applied it also for naval warfare. The most obvious change was the design (units were usually earmarked for operation in advance instead of being organized ad hoc) and the type of units involved (instead of combined arms, different classes of naval vessels were employed). One example is German Kampfgruppe 5 employed during Operation Weserübung. This unit consisted of the heavy cruiser Blücher, the heavy cruiser Lützow, the light cruiser Emden, three torpedo boats, and eight minesweepers carrying 2,000 troops to Oslo.

During the Second World War, the Kampfgeschwader bomber units of Luftwaffe consisted of several Kampfgruppen, which, in terms of size, were somewhere between squadrons and groups of Anglo-American air forces.

== Post-war influence ==
The most similar formations currently in use are the US Army Task force, the NATO battlegroup, and the Russian battalion tactical group. The Norwegian borderstation Korpfjell still use the German name Kampfgruppe Korpfjell.

== See also ==
- Kampfgruppen der Arbeiterklasse (KdA) or in English "Combat Groups of the Working Class" were a paramilitary organisation in East Germany, founded in 1953 and abolished in 1990. It numbered about 400,000 for much of its existence.
- Marching regiment
