= Golzow (Amt) =

- Amt
- Coat of arms

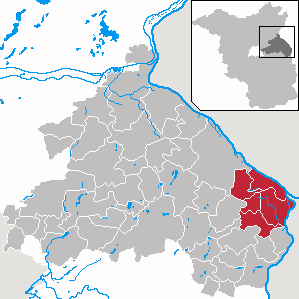
- Map of Märkisch-Oderland highlighting Golzow
- Interactive map of Golzow
- Location within Germany Location within Brandenburg
- Coordinates: 52°34′N 14°30′E
- Country: Germany
- State: Brandenburg
- District: Märkisch-Oderland
- Seat: Golzow
- Subdivisions: 5 municipalities

Area
  - Total: 152.01 km^{2} (58.69 sq mi)

Population (2025-12-31)
  - Total: 5,148
  - Density: 33.87/km^{2} (87.71/sq mi)
- Time zone: UTC+01:00 (CET)
  - Summer (DST): UTC+02:00 (CEST)
- Website: www.amt-golzow.de

Amt Golzow is an Amt ("collective municipality") in the district of Märkisch-Oderland, in Brandenburg, Germany. Its seat is in Golzow.

The Amt Golzow consists of the following municipalities:

1. Alt Tucheband
2. Bleyen-Genschmar
3. Golzow
4. Küstriner Vorland
5. Zechin

== Demography ==
Development of Population since 1875 within the Current Boundaries (Blue Line: Population; Dotted Line: Comparison to Population Development of Brandenburg state; Grey Background: Time of Nazi rule; Red Background: Time of Communist rule)

Recent Population Development and Projections (Population Development before Census 2011 (blue line); Recent Population Development according to the Census in Germany in 2011 (blue bordered line); Official projections for 2005-2030 (yellow line); for 2017-2030 (scarlet line); for 2020-2030 (green line)

Amt Golzow: Population development
within the current boundaries (2020)

Year	Pop.	±% p.a.
1875	13,500	—
1890	11,875	−0.85%
1910	9,712	−1.00%
1925	11,009	+0.84%
1939	10,210	−0.54%
1950	11,083	+0.75%
1964	9,148	−1.36%
1971	8,991	−0.25%
1981	7,890	−1.30%

Year	Pop.	±% p.a.
1985	7,741	−0.48%
1990	7,517	−0.59%
1995	6,991	−1.44%
2000	6,859	−0.38%
2005	6,271	−1.78%
2010	5,699	−1.89%
2015	5,313	−1.39%
2020	5,262	−0.19%
2025	5,148	−0.44%
