= Küstriner Vorland =

- Municipality
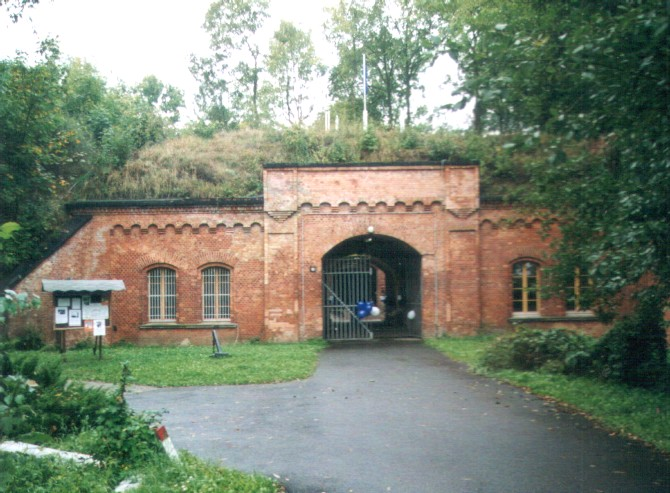
- Fort Gorgast

- Coat of arms

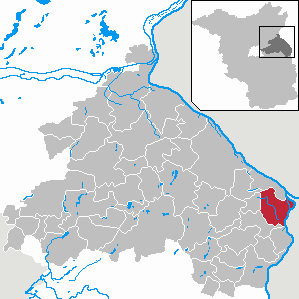
- Location of Küstriner Vorland within Märkisch-Oderland district
- Interactive map of Küstriner Vorland
- Location within Germany Location within Brandenburg
- Coordinates: 52°34′06″N 14°36′35″E
- Country: Germany
- State: Brandenburg
- District: Märkisch-Oderland
- Municipal assoc.: Golzow
- Subdivisions: 3 Ortsteile

Government
  - Mayor (2024–29): Werner Finger

Area
  - Total: 45.97 km^{2} (17.75 sq mi)
- Elevation: 10 m (33 ft)

Population (2025-12-31)
  - Total: 2,501
  - Density: 54.41/km^{2} (140.9/sq mi)
- Time zone: UTC+01:00 (CET)
  - Summer (DST): UTC+02:00 (CEST)
- Postal codes: 15328
- Dialling codes: 033472
- Vehicle registration: MOL
- Website: www.kuestriner-vorland.de

Küstriner Vorland (literally "Küstrin's foreland") is a municipality in the district Märkisch-Oderland, in Brandenburg, Germany at the border with Poland.

== History ==
It was established on January 1, 1998, by the merger of Küstrin-Kietz with the villages of Gorgast and Manschnow. Küstriner Vorland is part of the Amt ("collective municipality") Golzow.

The settlement of Küstrin-Kietz formed the western part of Küstrin which is now Polish Kostrzyn nad Odrą, until it was cut off by the implementation of the Oder-Neisse line in 1945. The town's quarters west of the Oder River then belonged to East Germany and were renamed Kietz in 1954. In a 1991 vote the inhabitants chose to readopt the historic denotation.

The incorporated village of Gorgast, once a commandry of the Order of Saint John, features a historic fort finished in 1889 in addition to the Küstrin fortification system and a park laid out according to plans by Peter Joseph Lenné.

== Politics ==
Seats in the municipal assembly (Gemeinderat) as of 2008 elections:

- IG Küstriner Vorland (Free Voters): 9
- The Left: 3
- Pro Zukunft (Free Voters): 1
- Evangelical parish: 1
- Independent: 2

== Transport ==
The border crossing at Küstrin-Kietz is the eastern terminus of the Bundesstraße 1 federal highway from Aachen via Berlin. It is continued by the Polish national road No. 22 to Gorzów Wielkopolski and Elbląg.

Küstrin-Kietz as well as Gorgast also have access to local trains running on the former Prussian Eastern Railway from Berlin-Lichtenberg to Küstrin (Kostrzyn nad Odrą).

== Demography ==
Development of population since 1875 within the current boundaries (Blue line: Population; Dotted line: Comparison to population development of Brandenburg state; Grey background: Time of Nazi rule; Red background: Time of communist rule)

Küstriner Vorland: Population development
within the current boundaries (2013)

Year	Pop.	±% p.a.
1875	3,973	—
1890	3,612	−0.63%
1910	2,985	−0.95%
1925	3,464	+1.00%
1933	3,428	−0.13%
1939	3,575	+0.70%
1946	3,761	+0.73%
1950	4,293	+3.36%
1964	3,913	−0.66%
1971	3,936	+0.08%
1981	3,682	−0.66%
1985	3,658	−0.16%
1989	3,656	−0.01%
1990	3,630	−0.71%
1991	3,520	−3.03%
1992	3,481	−1.11%
1993	3,447	−0.98%
1994	3,425	−0.64%
1995	3,397	−0.82%
1996	3,357	−1.18%

Year	Pop.	±% p.a.
1997	3,390	+0.98%
1998	3,347	−1.27%
1999	3,328	−0.57%
2000	3,303	−0.75%
2001	3,225	−2.36%
2002	3,160	−2.02%
2003	3,096	−2.03%
2004	3,022	−2.39%
2005	2,992	−0.99%
2006	2,977	−0.50%
2007	2,905	−2.42%
2008	2,873	−1.10%
2009	2,848	−0.87%
2010	2,754	−3.30%
2011	2,640	−4.14%
2012	2,606	−1.29%
2013	2,598	−0.31%
2014	2,606	+0.31%
2015	2,605	−0.04%
2016	2,546	−2.26%
