= List of Luftwaffe personnel convicted of war crimes =

This is a list of Luftwaffe personnel convicted of war crimes committed during World War II, including massacres, reprisals, and human experimentation.

Name	Rank	Crime	Convicted of	Sentence	Result
Alexander Andrae	General der Flieger	Commander of "Fortress Crete" from 9 June 1941 to 30 August 1942	War crimes	Four consecutive life sentences	Released in January 1952, after serving four years
Wilhelm Beiglböck	Consulting Physician to the Luftwaffe	Nazi human experiments in Dachau concentration camp	Crimes against humanity	15 years imprisonment	Released in 1952
Bruno Bräuer	General der Fallschirmtruppe	The deaths of 3,000 Cretans, massacres, systematic terrorism, deportation, pillage, wanton destruction, torture and ill treatment (Note: According to Antony Beevor, the crimes had been "committed under another general".)	War crimes	Execution	Executed 20 May 1947
