= Zechin =

- Municipality
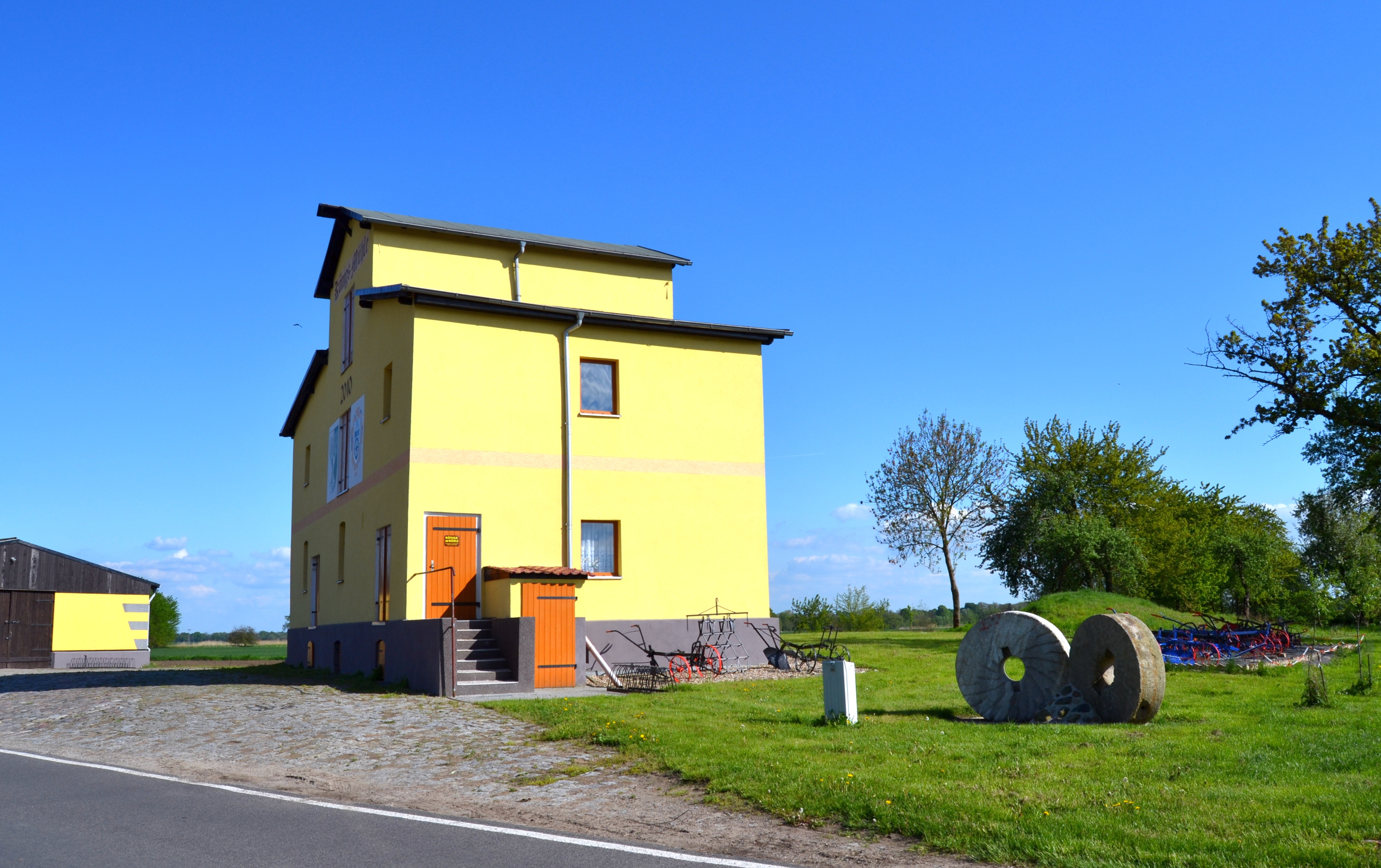
- Königs-Mühle (King's Mill) in Zechin.

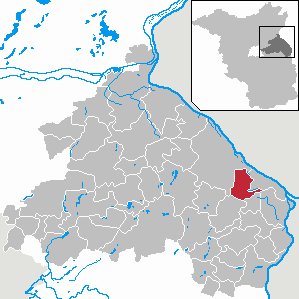
- Location of Zechin within Märkisch-Oderland district
- Interactive map of Zechin
- Location within Germany Location within Brandenburg
- Coordinates: 52°36′15″N 14°27′25″E
- Country: Germany
- State: Brandenburg
- District: Märkisch-Oderland
- Municipal assoc.: Golzow
- Subdivisions: 3 Ortsteile

Government
  - Mayor (2024–29): Dirk Lexow

Area
  - Total: 27.73 km^{2} (10.71 sq mi)
- Elevation: 9 m (30 ft)

Population (2025-12-31)
  - Total: 631
  - Density: 22.8/km^{2} (58.9/sq mi)
- Time zone: UTC+01:00 (CET)
  - Summer (DST): UTC+02:00 (CEST)
- Postal codes: 15328
- Dialling codes: 033473
- Vehicle registration: MOL
- Website: Gemeinde Zechin

Zechin is a municipality in the district Märkisch-Oderland, in Brandenburg, Germany.

== Demography ==
Development of population since 1875 within the current boundaries (Blue line: Population; Dotted line: Comparison to population development of Brandenburg state; Grey background: Time of Nazi rule; Red background: Time of communist rule)

Zechin: Population development
within the current boundaries (2013)

Year	Pop.	±% p.a.
1875	3,193	—
1890	2,760	−0.97%
1910	2,342	−0.82%
1925	2,333	−0.03%
1933	2,248	−0.46%
1939	2,034	−1.65%
1946	1,770	−1.97%
1950	2,144	+4.91%
1964	1,467	−2.67%
1971	1,321	−1.49%
1981	1,068	−2.10%
1985	1,000	−1.63%
1989	913	−2.25%
1990	905	−0.88%
1991	900	−0.55%
1992	875	−2.78%
1993	844	−3.54%
1994	844	+0.00%
1995	851	+0.83%
1996	839	−1.41%

Year	Pop.	±% p.a.
1997	848	+1.07%
1998	839	−1.06%
1999	830	−1.07%
2000	852	+2.65%
2001	837	−1.76%
2002	819	−2.15%
2003	812	−0.85%
2004	794	−2.22%
2005	776	−2.27%
2006	776	+0.00%
2007	738	−4.90%
2008	715	−3.12%
2009	717	+0.28%
2010	708	−1.26%
2011	678	−4.24%
2012	686	+1.18%
2013	675	−1.60%
2014	644	−4.59%
2015	638	−0.93%
2016	647	+1.41%
