= Golzow =

- Municipality
- Coat of arms

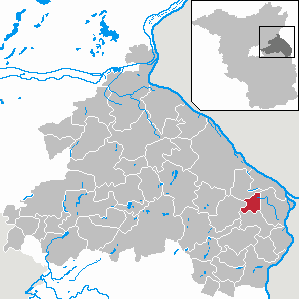
- Location of Golzow within Märkisch-Oderland district
- Interactive map of Golzow
- Location within Germany Location within Brandenburg
- Coordinates: 52°34′00″N 14°30′00″E
- Country: Germany
- State: Brandenburg
- District: Märkisch-Oderland
- Municipal assoc.: Golzow

Government
  - Mayor (2024–29): Frank Schütz

Area
  - Total: 17.21 km^{2} (6.64 sq mi)
- Elevation: 10 m (33 ft)

Population (2025-12-31)
  - Total: 773
  - Density: 44.9/km^{2} (116/sq mi)
- Time zone: UTC+01:00 (CET)
  - Summer (DST): UTC+02:00 (CEST)
- Postal codes: 15328
- Dialling codes: 033472
- Vehicle registration: MOL

Golzow is a municipality in the district Märkisch-Oderland, in Brandenburg, Germany.

== Culture and sightseeing ==
Golzow is famous for the DEFA long-term documentary "Die Kinder von Golzow" (The children of Golzow), which accompanied the lives of people from Golzow in numerous films between 1961 and 2007.

== Demography ==
Development of Population since 1875 within the Current Boundaries (Blue Line: Population; Dotted Line: Comparison to Population Development of Brandenburg state; Grey Background: Time of Nazi rule; Red Background: Time of Communist rule)

Golzow [Oderbruch]: Population development
within the current boundaries (2013)

Year	Pop.	±% p.a.
1875	2,061	—
1890	1,819	−0.83%
1910	1,432	−1.19%
1925	1,790	+1.50%
1933	1,687	−0.74%
1939	1,620	−0.67%
1946	1,217	−4.00%
1950	1,513	+5.59%
1964	1,287	−1.15%
1971	1,318	+0.34%
1981	1,245	−0.57%
1985	1,242	−0.06%
1989	1,217	−0.51%
1990	1,223	+0.49%
1991	1,212	−0.90%
1992	1,184	−2.31%
1993	1,161	−1.94%
1994	1,148	−1.12%
1995	1,137	−0.96%
1996	1,108	−2.55%

Year	Pop.	±% p.a.
1997	1,111	+0.27%
1998	1,087	−2.16%
1999	1,081	−0.55%
2000	1,060	−1.94%
2001	1,039	−1.98%
2002	1,004	−3.37%
2003	973	−3.09%
2004	953	−2.06%
2005	920	−3.46%
2006	905	−1.63%
2007	938	+3.65%
2008	903	−3.73%
2009	890	−1.44%
2010	864	−2.92%
2011	904	+4.63%
2012	887	−1.88%
2013	856	−3.49%
2014	840	−1.87%
2015	836	−0.48%
2016	831	−0.60%
