= Bleyen-Genschmar =

- Municipality
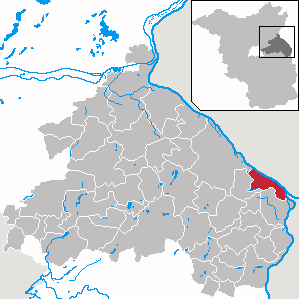
- Location of Bleyen-Genschmar within Märkisch-Oderland district
- Interactive map of Bleyen-Genschmar
- Location within Germany Location within Brandenburg
- Coordinates: 52°35′N 14°35′E
- Country: Germany
- State: Brandenburg
- District: Märkisch-Oderland
- Municipal assoc.: Golzow
- Subdivisions: 2 Ortsteile

Government
  - Mayor (2024–29): Dirk Hundertmark

Area
  - Total: 29.73 km^{2} (11.48 sq mi)
- Elevation: 10 m (33 ft)

Population (2025-12-31)
  - Total: 408
  - Density: 13.7/km^{2} (35.5/sq mi)
- Time zone: UTC+01:00 (CET)
  - Summer (DST): UTC+02:00 (CEST)
- Postal codes: 15328
- Dialling codes: 033472
- Vehicle registration: MOL
- Website: www.genschmar.de

Bleyen-Genschmar is a municipality in the district Märkisch-Oderland, in Brandenburg, Germany.

== Demography ==
Development of population since 1875 within the current boundaries (Blue line: Population; Dotted line: Comparison to population development of Brandenburg state; Grey background: Time of Nazi rule; Red background: Time of communist rule)

Bleyen-Genschmar: Population development
within the current boundaries (2013)

Year	Pop.	±% p.a.
1875	1,409	—
1890	1,276	−0.66%
1910	1,169	−0.44%
1925	1,344	+0.93%
1933	1,281	−0.60%
1939	1,187	−1.26%
1946	1,002	−2.39%
1950	1,119	+2.80%
1964	1,009	−0.74%
1971	975	−0.49%
1981	720	−2.99%
1985	686	−1.20%
1989	674	−0.44%
1990	667	−1.04%
1991	623	−6.60%
1992	602	−3.37%
1993	600	−0.33%
1994	593	−1.17%
1995	576	−2.87%
1996	588	+2.08%

Year	Pop.	±% p.a.
1997	601	+2.21%
1998	596	−0.83%
1999	592	−0.67%
2000	591	−0.17%
2001	589	−0.34%
2002	591	+0.34%
2003	581	−1.69%
2004	558	−3.96%
2005	557	−0.18%
2006	560	+0.54%
2007	536	−4.29%
2008	511	−4.66%
2009	499	−2.35%
2010	487	−2.40%
2011	489	+0.41%
2012	498	+1.84%
2013	492	−1.20%
2014	490	−0.41%
2015	468	−4.49%
2016	462	−1.28%
