= Alt Tucheband =

- Municipality
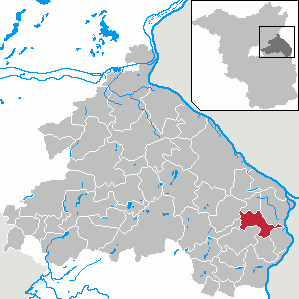
- Location of Alt Tucheband within Märkisch-Oderland district
- Interactive map of Alt Tucheband
- Location within Germany Location within Brandenburg
- Coordinates: 52°32′N 14°31′E
- Country: Germany
- State: Brandenburg
- District: Märkisch-Oderland
- Municipal assoc.: Golzow
- Subdivisions: 3 Ortsteile

Government
  - Mayor (2024–29): Thomas Kowalzik

Area
  - Total: 30.59 km^{2} (11.81 sq mi)
- Elevation: 11 m (36 ft)

Population (2025-12-31)
  - Total: 835
  - Density: 27.3/km^{2} (70.7/sq mi)
- Time zone: UTC+01:00 (CET)
  - Summer (DST): UTC+02:00 (CEST)
- Postal codes: 15328
- Dialling codes: 033472
- Vehicle registration: MOL
- Website: Alt Tuchebandl

Alt Tucheband is a municipality in the district Märkisch-Oderland, in Brandenburg, Germany.

In 1991 Alt Tucheband joined the administrative community Golzow, from 1992 the office Golzow. With effect from 31 December 2001, the municipalities of Hathenow, Rathstock and Alt Tucheband voluntarily merged to form the present-day municipality of Alt Tucheband[5] as part of the municipal area reform of the state of Brandenburg.

== Demography ==
Development of population since 1875 within the current boundaries (Blue line: Population; Dotted line: Comparison to population development of Brandenburg state; Grey background: Time of Nazi rule; Red background: Time of communist rule)

Alt Tucheband: Population development
within the current boundaries (2013)

Year	Pop.	±% p.a.
1875	2,864	—
1890	2,408	−1.15%
1910	1,784	−1.49%
1925	2,078	+1.02%
1933	1,886	−1.20%
1939	1,794	−0.83%
1946	1,553	−2.04%
1950	2,014	+6.71%
1964	1,472	−2.21%
1971	1,441	−0.30%
1981	1,175	−2.02%
1985	1,155	−0.43%
1989	1,097	−1.28%
1990	1,092	−0.46%
1991	1,073	−1.74%
1992	1,072	−0.09%
1993	1,055	−1.59%
1994	1,031	−2.27%
1995	1,030	−0.10%
1996	1,050	+1.94%

Year	Pop.	±% p.a.
1997	1,053	+0.29%
1998	1,048	−0.47%
1999	1,049	+0.10%
2000	1,053	+0.38%
2001	1,015	−3.61%
2002	1,011	−0.39%
2003	1,015	+0.40%
2004	1,027	+1.18%
2005	1,026	−0.10%
2006	973	−5.17%
2007	936	−3.80%
2008	927	−0.96%
2009	914	−1.40%
2010	886	−3.06%
2011	846	−4.51%
2012	811	−4.14%
2013	790	−2.59%
2014	760	−3.80%
2015	766	+0.79%
2016	793	+3.52%
