= List of Deutsche Luft Hansa accidents and incidents =

This is a list of accidents and incidents involving German airline Deutsche Luft Hansa (1926-1945). The airline suffered a total of 58 accidents.

== 1920s ==
- 8 March 1926: Junkers F.13 D-290 Haubenlerche stalled and crashed at Staaken during a left turn while on a training flight, killing the pilot.
- 14 July 1926: Junkers F.13 D-272 Silbermöwe crashed near Juist Island, Germany following an uncontrolled descent in bad weather, killing all five on board.
- 26 November 1926: Junkers G 24 D-944 crashed shortly after takeoff from Königsberg, Germany (now Kaliningrad, Russia) due to engine problems; all on board survived. The aircraft then burned out following an unexplained fire.
- 22 April 1927: Fokker-Grulich F.III D-729 Unstrut crashed at Floh due to engine failure in bad weather, killing the pilot and passenger.
- 27 July 1927: Junkers F.13bi D-206 Zeisig stalled and crashed at Amöneburg while attempting a forced landing following engine failure, killing all five on board.
- 23 September 1927: Dornier Merkur II D-585 Puma crashed at Schleiz en route to Munich from Berlin due to a broken wing strut and resultant wing separation, killing all six on board.
- 6 January 1928: Junkers G.24ge D-1078 Cupido struck trees and crashed at Fort l'Éculse near Bellegarde, Ain, France while on approach to Geneva; all three crew survived, but the aircraft was written off. The pilot did not realize the aircraft was too low due to poor visibility.
- 19 April 1928: Junkers G 24 D-946 Prometheus force-landed in a forest near Spaichingen; all eight on board survived (one passenger was injured), but the aircraft was written off.
- 26 May 1928: Junkers F 13ci D-583 Wildente crashed at Radevormwald due to pilot error, killing three of five on board.
- 25 September 1928: Junkers G.31de D-1427 Deutschland crashed at Arnsberg following an unexplained engine fire; all nine on board survived, but the aircraft was written off.
- 11 December 1928: Junkers G.31fi D-1473 Rhineland crashed following an emergency landing at Letzlingen in a snowstorm after a fuel line broke, killing three of four on board, including pilot Gustav Doerr.
- December 1928: Junkers G.31ce D-1137 crashed in Germany.
- 1 February 1929: Junkers G 24 D-899 Juno crashed near Luzarches, France after failing to locate Le Bourget Airport due to poor visibility in fog; all three crew survived.
- 22 July 1929: Fokker-Grulich F.II D-780 Havel crashed shortly after takeoff from Templehof Airport due to loss of control following engine failure, killing the pilot. The engine failure was caused by a cracked crankshaft.
- 10 September 1929: Rohrback Romar I D-1734 Bremen ditched in the Baltic Sea off Grömitz, Germany following engine failure; all on board survived. The aircraft later sank and although salvaged, it was not repaired.
- 6 November 1929: Junkers G.24bi D-903 Oberschlesien en route from Croydon to Schiphol crashed in thick fog at Godstone, Surrey, United Kingdom, resulting in the deaths of seven of the nine people on board.
- 18 November 1929: Rohrbach Romar I D-1693 Hamburg crashed on takeoff from Lübeck harbor; the crew survived, but the aircraft was not repaired and was written off.
- 19 December 1929: The sole Arado V I, D-1594 Tenerife, force-landed near Neuruppin after the pilot became disorientated in poor visibility, killing both pilots; the flight engineer survived.

== 1930s ==
- 4 April 1930: Junkers F 13f1e D-422 Eidergans crashed in the Frauenwald forest near Idstein in fog while on a Frankfurt-Cologne passenger service; the pilot and passenger survived, but the aircraft was written off.
- 7 April 1930: Junkers W.33d D-1649 Baikal crashed at Limpsfield Common, Surrey while on a freight flight to Croydon en route from Berlin following a loss of control during descent, killing both crew.
- 13 June 1930: Dornier Merkur D-1686 struck trees at Gütersloh after an emergency landing due to unexplained engine failure; no casualties.
- 7 July 1930: Dornier Do J Gas Wal D-864 ditched in a storm in the Atlantic off Bornholm, Denmark en route from Stettin to Norway due to engine failure; the aircraft was capsized by a wave and sank while under tow three hours later; five of eight on board died. The engine failure was caused by a broken crankshaft.
- 28 July 1930: Fokker-Grulich F.IIb D-758 Trave crashed at Jüterbog while attempting an emergency landing; both the pilot and passenger survived.
- 6 August 1930: Junkers W 33d D-1826 Karpathen was on a Stockholm-Stralsund mail flight when it struck a mountain near Valdemarsvik, Sweden at night and crashed into the sea and sank, killing both pilots (one body was found 12 days later and the second a month later). The aircraft was salvaged and rebuilt in the Soviet Union with registration CCCP-H4.
- 6 October 1930: Messerschmitt M 20b D-1930 Lechfeld stalled, entered a dive, and crashed near Dresden-Heller Airport due to possible engine failure, killing all eight on board
- 7 March 1931: Rohrbach Roland Ia D-1338 caught fire and burned out at Tubbergen following an emergency landing; all eight on board were able to escape and survived. While cruising northeast of Almelo, thick white smoke spread through the cabin and the pilot descended to make an emergency landing. The cause of the fire was not determined (possibly started by a heating pipe or short circuit in the radio wiring), but it likely broke out under the pilot's seat. The aircraft was operating a flight from Amsterdam to Berlin via Hanover.
- 14 April 1931: Messerschmitt M 20b D-1928 Rheinpfalz crashed near Letschen due to structural failure of the tailplane, killing two of three crew; all seven passengers survived.
- 18 April 1931: Junkers F 24ko D-896 Düsseldorf crashed in a forest near a road at Gex (Ain), France while flying too low due to poor visibility; all six on board survived. The aircraft was rebuilt to F 24kay standard in December 1931 and re-registered D-ULIS; the aircraft was later used as a testbed for the Jumo 4 diesel engine and the Daimler-Benz DB 600 and DB 601 V12 engines, but was written off following a 1939 crash.
- 13 June 1931: Dornier Merkur II D-1455 Weissfuchs crashed at Saarbrücken after a loss of control possibly caused by engine failure, killing all four on board.
- 6 October 1931: Heinkel HE 12 D-1717 New York crashed at Cobequid Bay, Nova Scotia in fog, killing all three on board.
- 23 November 1931: Fokker-Grulich F.IIb D-766 Lahn crashed in Germany.
- 2 May 1932: Fokker-Grulich F.IIb D-765 Eider struck trees and crashed on the side of Mount Süntel (near Pötzen) while flying too low due to fog; all five on board survived.
- 29 July 1932: Junkers Ju 52/3mce D-2201 Oswald Boelke collided in mid-air over Munich with a DVS Udet U 12a (D-1296). The Ju 52 was repaired and returned to service and later re-registered D-ALOM; this registration was cancelled in January 1939.
- 29 October 1932: Junkers W.33f D-2017 Marmara was on a freight flight from Croydon Airport to Cologne when it crashed off the Kent coast. The next day a wheel was found by the crew of a Belgian ship but neither the aircraft nor the two crew have ever been found.
- 2 November 1932: Junkers F 13bi D-724 Kolkrabe crashed in mountainous terrain near Echterpfuhl after a wing separated, killing all five on board.
- 13 January 1933: Junkers W 33f D-2018 Bukowina crashed at Tanagra, Greece while attempting to return to Thessaloniki due to poor visibility; both pilots survived.
- 3 April 1933: Junkers F 13 D-534 Auerhahn crashed and burned at Hemkenrode following an unexplained in-flight fire, killing one of two on board.
- 29 April 1933: Junkers W 34gi D-4 lost control and crashed in Traunstein during a test flight out of Berlin, killing all four on board. The aircraft was on a test flight before its delivery to Eurasia.
- 11 December 1933: Focke-Wulf A.17a D-1403 Luneburg crashed on landing at Hamburg after striking an obstacle while flying too low, killing seven of eight on board.
- 10 March 1934: Junkers F 24k2kay D-1019 Rotterdam crashed near Gliwice, Poland; the aircraft was initially built as a three-engine G 24 and was converted to a single-engine F 24 in May 1928.
- 22 June 1934: Dornier Merkur II D-1445 Nerz crashed at Chausseehaus in poor weather, killing one of six on board.
- 24 July 1934: Fokker-Grulich F.IIb D-OGOT crashed in Germany.
- 3 November 1934: Heinkel He 70 D-UHUX crashed near Carcassonne, France following technical problems; both pilots survived.
- 7 December 1934: Junkers F 13ke D-OMAS crashed at Sachau, killing all three on board.
- 14 January 1935: Heinkel He 70D-0 D-UDAS crashed near Constance, killing both pilots.
- 25 April 1935: Junkers Ju 52/3mho D-AJYR Emil Schäfer struck a mountain near Hallgarten, Germany in bad weather, killing three of six on board.
- 24 May 1935: Boeing 247 D-AGAR (former NC91Y) was written off at Nurnburg-Marienburg after it was struck by a taxiing Air France aircraft.
- 2 November 1935: Dornier Do 18 D-AHIS Monsun crashed into water at Travemünde during a high-speed low-altitude test flight, killing three of five on board.
- 24 December 1935: Heinkel He 70 D-UVOR crashed at Breslau (now Wroclaw, Poland) due to pilot error, killing all three on board.
- 1935: Junkers F.24ko D-ULET Sachsen was reportedly written off in Germany.
- 15 February 1936: Dornier Do J Wal D-ADYS Tornado disappeared over the South Atlantic with four on board.
- 17 April 1936: Junkers Ju 52/3m D-ASOR struck a mountain near Orvin, Switzerland after the crew became disorientated due to a navigation error, killing three of five on board. The aircraft was operating a passenger service from Lechfeld to Frankfurt.
- 27 April 1936: Messerschmitt M.20b D-UNAH (ex D-2005) Odenwald crashed at Kiel Airport; no casualties.
- 10 June 1936: Fokker-Grulich F.IIb D-OVYF Pregel crashed in Germany.
- 13 June 1936: Junkers Ju 160 D-UPYM Puma crashed at Hannover due to engine failure, killing one of six on board.
- 24 June 1936: Fokker-Grulich F.IIb D-OJIP crashed in Germany.
- 19 July 1936: Junkers F 13f1e D-OBAZ Kronenreiher crashed on approach to Borkum; the pilot survived.
- 22 July 1936: Junkers Ju 160 D-ULUR Schakal crashed at Cholmek, Czechoslovakia (now Czech Republic) while on approach to Prague following a loss of control, killing both pilots.
- 26 July 1936: Junkers G.38di D-AZUR (formerly D-2000) Deutschland crashed at Dessau due to mechanical failure during a test flight; the pilot survived, but the aircraft was written off.
- 19 September 1936: Junkers Ju 52/3mce D-AJUX Hermann Göring crashed near Frankfurt Airport; no casualties.
- 1 November 1936: Junkers Ju 52/3mge D-APOO Heinrich Kroll crashed into mountains near Tabarz while en route to Erfurt from Frankfurt, killing 11 of 15 on board.
- 17 November 1936: Junkers Ju 52/3mge D-ASUI Hans Berr crashed into a mountain near Lauf an der Pegnitz while on approach to Nurnburg-Marienburg Airport on a Leipzig-Marienburg passenger service, killing four of 16 on board. The pilot became disorientated in heavy snow and poor visibility.
- 28 November 1936: Junkers Ju 52/3m D-ATAK Marshall v. Bieberstein crashed at Hanover while attempting an emergency landing due to icing; all 15 on board survived.
- 4 December 1936: Junkers Ju 52/3m D-ASIH Rudolf Windisch struck a mountain at Le Grand-Bornand in the French Alps, killing all six on board. The aircraft was operating a Lisbon–Geneva–Stuttgart passenger service.
- 12 March 1937: Heinkel He 111C D-ALIX Rostock crashed on approach to Bathurst (now Banjul), Gambia for reasons unknown, killing all four crew on board; 90% of the mail on board was recovered, but the crew was never found.
- 26 March 1937: Junkers Ju 160 D-UPOZ Wolf crashed at Wätzum due to engine failure, killing one of six on board.
- April 1937: Junkers A 20feL D-IBUX Erde crashed in Germany.
- 20 May 1937: Heinkel He 70 D-UXUV stalled and crashed on takeoff from Stuttgart, killing two of six on board.
- 14 June 1937: Messerschmitt M.20b Fläming crashed at Halberstadt.
- 12 November 1937: Heinkel He 111C-03 D-AXAV Köln crashed in the Weissen Stein mountains at Oldenwald, Germany due to possible spatial disorientation, killing 10 of 12 on board.
- 26 November 1937: Junkers Ju 52/3mfe D-AGAV Emil Schäfer crashed in fog into a hangar on takeoff at Croydon Airport, killing all three on board.
- 4 January 1938: Junkers Ju 52/3mte D-ABUR Charles Haar crashed in a snowstorm at Frankfurt en route from Milan due to wing icing, killing all six on board.
- 22 February 1938: Junkers Ju 52/3mge D-APAR Otto Parschau crashed in fog near Pontoise, France, killing the three crew. The aircraft was operating a Berlin–Cologne–Paris mail service.
- 27 May 1938: Heinkel He 116A-2 D-ATIO Hamburg crashed on the beach at Langeoog Island, Germany during a test flight, killing all three on board.
- 1 October 1938: Junkers Ju 52/3mte D-AVFB disappeared en route to Milan from Frankfurt with 13 on board; the wreckage was found on 14 July 1952 on the slope of the Pizzo Cengalo in northern Italy on the Swiss border.
- 1 October 1938: Dornier Do 18E D-AROZ Pampero disappeared off Bathurst (now Banjul), Gambia with four on board.
- 26 November 1938: Junkers Ju 90V2 D-AIVI Pruessen stalled, struck a palm tree and crashed at Bathurst (now Banjul), Gambia after both left side engines failed shortly after takeoff while on a tropical trial flight, killing 12 of 15 on board.
- 2 December 1938: Junkers Ju 52/3mte D-ANOY Rudolf v. Thüna crashed near Vienna while on approach to Schwechat Airport; all eight on board survived. The crew had continued the approach while flying too low.
- 6 December 1938: Focke-Wulf Fw 200S-1 D-ACON Brandenburg ditched in Cavite Bay off Manila after all four engines failed due to mismanagement of the fuel system; all six on board survived, but the aircraft was written off.
- 3 August 1939: Junkers Ju 52/3mte D-ANJH Hans Loeb crashed on landing at Mingaladon Airport; no casualties.
- 4 August 1939: Junkers Ju 52/3mte D-AUJG Hans Wende crashed in the Llaberia mountains near Tivissa, Spain, killing all seven on board.
- 24 August 1939: Junkers F.24kay D-ULIS Düsseldorf crashed in flames near Glindow, Germany following an engine fire during a test flight for the Daimler-Benz DB 601 V12 engine, killing both pilots.
- 30 August 1939: Junkers Ju 52/3mte D-AFOP Karl Hochmuth stalled and crashed on takeoff from Hannover Airport, killing all seven on board. The aircraft was operating a Berlin–Hannover–Cologne–London passenger service.
- 9 September 1939: Junkers Ju 160A-0 D-UQOL Tiger crashed at Cologne; no casualties.

== 1940s ==
- 22 June 1940: Junkers Ju 52/3mte D-AGBI Max von Mulzer crashed in Brussels following a mid-air collision with an unknown aircraft, killing nine of 11 on board.
- 9 August 1940: Douglas DC-2-115E D-AIAV crashed near Lämershagen en route to Hannover due to possible pilot error, killing 2 of 13 on board.
- 29 October 1940: Douglas DC-3-220 D-AAIH Prag crashed on takeoff from Tempelhof Airport in bad weather, killing both pilots; all 13 passengers survived.
- 8 November 1940: Junkers Ju 90A D-AVMF Brandenburg crashed at Schönteichen en route to Budapest from Berlin due to tail icing, killing all 6 crew and 23 passengers on board in the worst-ever accident involving the Junkers Ju 90 and the deadliest accident for the airline.
- 1 March 1941: While landing at Hommelvik Bay, Norway, Junkers Ju 52/3mte D-AQUB Hans Berr struck a dune crest and became airborne again, reaching a height of 4–5 m (13–16 ft), but then landed hard, breaking off both floats and nosing down in the water. Three of six passengers drowned; all three crew survived.
- 20 October 1941: Junkers Ju 52/3mte D-AUXZ Otto v. Beaulieau-Marconay struck a mountain slope near Gabrene, Petrich, Bulgaria in bad weather, killing all 13 on board.
- 22 October 1942: Junkers Ju 52/3mte D-AYGX Johannes Höroldt struck the side of Fruška Gora at 380 m (1,250 ft) near Bukovac, Serbia while flying through clouds, killing all 17 passengers and crew on board. The pilot had received incorrect weather information and thought the cloud base was at 600 m (2,000 ft).
- 9 December 1942: Douglas DC-3-194F D-ABBF struck trees and crashed on landing at Barajas Airport in fog; all 24 on board survived, but the aircraft was written off.
- 1 March 1943: Junkers Ju 52/3mte D-AQUB Hans Berr crashed on landing in Hommelvik Bay off Trondheim; no casualties.
- 1943: Douglas DC-3-220A D-AAIF Brünn was destroyed in an enemy attack in Germany.
- 1943: Junkers Ju 52/3mfe D-AGUK Kurt Wolf crashed in Germany.
- 15 January 1944: Junkers Ju 52/3m D-ADQW Harry Rother crashed at Belgrade, Serbia due to pilot error, killing all five on board.
- 26 January 1944: Douglas DC-2-211 D-AAID force-landed at Plötzig (now Plocicz), Poland due to engine failure; there were no casualties, but the aircraft was written off.
- 11 February 1944: Douglas DC-2-115E D-ABOW stalled and crashed at Tempelhof Airport while attempting to return following a fuel leak; there were no casualties, but the aircraft was written off.
- 21 February 1944: Junkers Ju 52/3m D-AWAS Joachim Blankenburg went missing off Eretria, Greece with 16 on board after reporting engine problems; the wreckage was never found.
- 17 April 1944: Junkers Ju 52/3m D-AOCA Harry Rother was attacked by an Allied fighter shortly after takeoff from Zemun Airfield and crashed at Stara Pazova, Serbia, killing three of five on board. The aircraft was one of two that were shot down.
- 21 April 1944: Douglas DC-3-220B D-AAIG ditched in Oslofjord off Fredrikstad, Norway after a signal flare started a fire on board, killing nine of 20 on board.
- 9 August 1944: Junkers Ju 90V3 D-AURE Bayern burned out on the ground at Stuttgart during an Allied bombing raid, there were no casualties as no one was on board.
- 14 August 1944: Douglas DC-3-220A D-AAIE Mährisch-Ostrau was destroyed on the ground at Echterdingen Airport during an attack by a USAAF B-17.
- 2 September 1944: Junkers Ju 52/3m D-AUAW Gerhard Amann was shot down over Belgrade by an enemy fighter, killing all five on board.
- 27 September 1944: At 20:30 local time, Focke-Wulf Fw-200D-2 D-AMHL was shot down by a Bristol Beaufighter near Dijon. The aircraft had been on a scheduled passenger flight from Stuttgart to Barcelona with five passengers and four crew members on board, all of which were killed.
- 16 October 1944: Flight 7, a Junkers Ju 52/3mg8e (D-ADQV, named Hermann Stache), crashed into Skorvefjell mountain in Flatdal in Seljord Municipality, Norway in poor visibility conditions, killing all 15 people on board, including discharged Frontkämpfer Kjell Marthinsen, son of Nazi police general Karl Marthinsen.
- 17 October 1944: Junkers Ju 52/3m D-ASHE Friedrich Dahmen was attacked by an RAF Mosquito fighter and force-landed at Komárom County, Hungary, killing one of nine on board.
- 29 November 1944: At 10:25 local time, Focke-Wulf Fw 200A-0/S-5 D-ARHW Friesland was accidentally shot down by a German "patrol boat" off the Swedish coast during a flight from Berlin to Stockholm, killing the six passengers and four crew members on board.
- 10 January 1945: Junkers Ju 52/3m D-AUSS Joseph Langfeld crashed near Prnjavor, Bosnia and Herzegovina, killing all seven on board.
- 20 April 1945: During the Battle of Berlin, Junkers Ju 52/3m D-ANAJ was shot down by Soviet fighters while on a Berlin-Munich-Prague evacuation flight, killing 3 crew and 15 passengers on board, including film director Hans Steinhoff. Two passengers survived.
- 21 April 1945: During the Battle of Berlin, Focke-Wulf Fw 200C-3 D-ASHH Hessen escaped from Berlin for a flight to Munich, but crashed near Obertraubling in Bavaria, killing the sixteen passengers and five crew members. Nothing was known about the location of the crash site until 1949, when a Hungarian showed up at the city administration at Neumarkt-Sankt Veit with the insurance certificate of August Künstle, the pilot of the aircraft. In 1950, it was discovered that the aircraft had crashed near Piesenkofen. Excavations were performed at the crash site in 1952, finding Künstle's pilot's license and personal belongings of the occupants. The remains were buried at Tegernbach. According to eyewitness accounts, the aircraft was on fire as it circled Piesenkofen, began hitting trees and crashed in a near-vertical dive; a portion of the left wing was found some 300 m (980 ft) from the crash site. The engine fire was caused by a carburetor fire or a lightning strike, after which the engine exploded, tearing off a portion of the left wing.
