= Junkers Ju 90 =

Type of aircraft

Ju 90
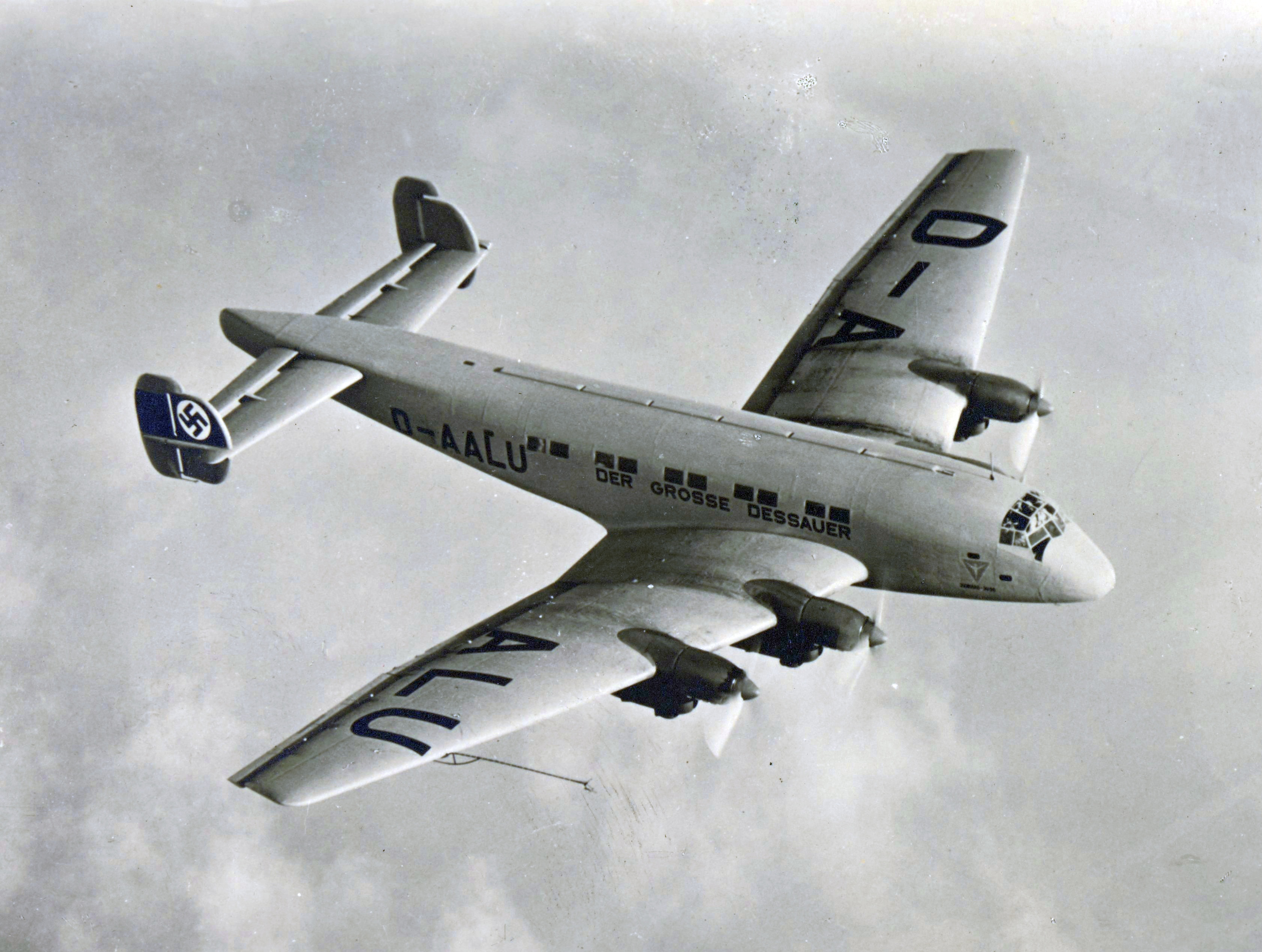
- Ju 90 V1 Der Grosse Dessauer with Daimler-Benz DB 600C motors, 1937

General information
- Type: Airliner, transport
- National origin: Germany
- Manufacturer: Junkers
- Primary users: Deutsche Luft Hansa Luftwaffe
- Number built: 18

History
- Introduction date: 1938
- First flight: 28 August 1937
- Developed from: Junkers Ju 89
- Developed into: Junkers Ju 290

The Junkers Ju 90 was a four-engined airliner and transport aircraft designed and produced by the German aircraft manufacturer Junkers.

Derived from the abortive Ju 89 strategic bomber, it was developed to be used as a long-distance commercial aircraft for the German flag carrier Deutsche Luft Hansa. It drew heavily upon the Ju 89, sharing the same wing and tail unit while adopting an all-new fuselage that could seat up to 40 passengers. In contrast to the corrugated skin traditionally used on Junkers aircraft, virtually all of the aircraft had a smooth duralumin covering. Various models of engines were used to power the type. Junkers' design team was headed by Ernst Zindel, and Professor Herbert Wagner.

On 28 August 1937, the first prototype performed its maiden flight; flight testing was undertaken in close collaboration with Deutsche Luft Hansa, who was sufficiently encouraged by the results to issue a production order. While the Ju 90 did enter limited service with the airline, the planned full scale passenger services envisioned were never enacted due to the outbreak of the Second World War. During the conflict, the civil Ju 90s were impressed into service with the Luftwaffe as military transports. They were active during the invasion of Norway and on the Eastern Front, where they supplied the German 6th Army that was besieged at Stalingrad. Luftwaffe Ju 90s were also operated in the Mediterranean for a time.

Several Ju 90s were rebuilt into prototypes for the Ju 290, a larger transport and reconnaissance aircraft. Just two Ju 90s survived the conflict and were scrapped shortly thereafter.

== Design and development ==
=== Background ===
The origins of the Junkers Ju 90 are directly connected with that of the Ju 89, a prototype strategic bomber. This aircraft, which had commenced developing during the mid-1930s, was a contender in the Ural bomber programme that was aimed at creating a long-range strategic bombing capacity for the Luftwaffe. By the time that the Ju 89 programme had made it through to the flight testing phase, the development of four-engined bombers had become an increasing politically contentious matter, particularly following the untimely demise of General Wever (one of the programme's most powerful advocates) as well as rising tensions between Erhard Milch (another proponent) and commander-in-chief of the Luftwaffe, Hermann Göring. Recognising that strategic bombing was falling out of favour with the Reichsluftfahrtministerium (RLM) in favour of smaller and faster bombers, Junkers approached the RLM with their proposal to reuse the components intended for the third Ju 89 prototype to produce a transport aircraft for the German flag carrier Deutsche Luft Hansa instead.

The RLM consented to Junkers' proposal, but only on the basis that an alternative engine to the Ju 89's Daimler-Benz DB 600A V-12 engine was used on any subsequent aircraft. Accordingly, while the aircraft retained the wings and tail unit of the Ju 89, it also incorporated an all-new fuselage that was considerably wider and suitable for the carriage of passengers. This new rectangular section fuselage was primarily constructed of duralumin along with some steel elements, was relatively generous by the standards of the time, possessing an internal width of 2.83 m (9 ft 3 1/2 in).

In terms of its basic configuration, the Ju 90 was a four-engine all-metal low-wing aircraft fitted with twin end-plate vertical stabilizers. The wings were built around five tubular girder spars and covered with a smooth stressed skin. The leading edge was quite markedly swept while the trailing edge was almost straight. The Junkers "double wing", a full-span movable flap/aileron combination, was also present. The fins and rudders, the latter with prominent horn balances assemblies, were placed at the end of the tailplane; this latter carried the elevators separated by a gap, forming another double wing. The rudders and rear portion of the elevator of the prototypes were the only part of the aircraft to use the traditional Junkers corrugated skin; all other areas had a smooth duralumin covering that was flush-rivetted.

The interior of the aircraft could be configured into various cabin layouts; when arranged to maximise occupancy, the carriage of up to 40 passengers was possible. Aft of the passenger compartments were Toilets, a cloakroom, a storage space for air mail; a baggage hold was located forward of the passenger compartment. The tailwheel undercarriage was fully retractable, the single-wheel main units were raised hydraulically into the inner engine nacelles.

=== Into flight and civil usage ===
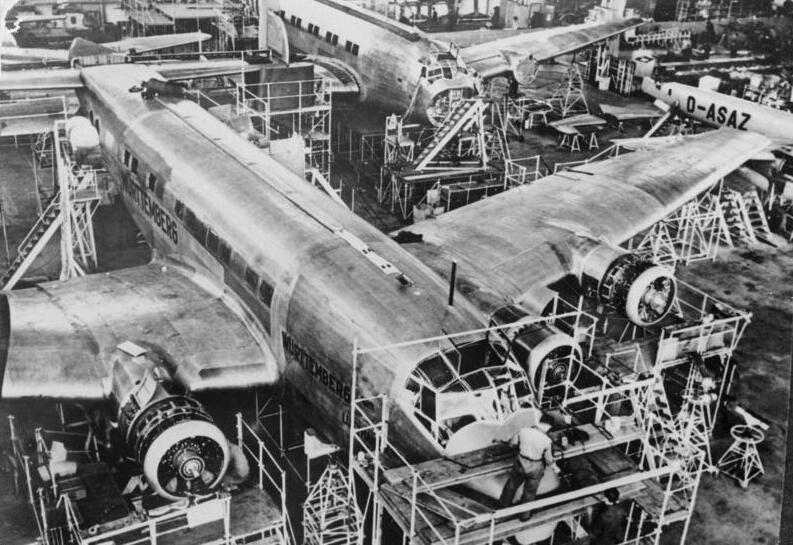
Junkers Ju 90 under construction at Junkers-Werke Dessau, 1938

On 28 August 1937, the first prototype, the Ju 90 V1, performed its maiden flight; it was powered by four Daimler-Benz DB 600C liquid-cooled inverted V engines, each one capable of producing up to 820 kW (1,100 hp). These engines were more powerful than both those of its Ju 89 predecessor and subsequent production standard commercial Ju 90s. It was named Der Grosse Dessauer, as had been the earlier Junkers G 38. Deutsche Luft Hansa played a leading role in the long-distance portion of flight testing. On 6 February 1938, following eight months of flight tests, this first prototype was lost while performing over-speed tests.

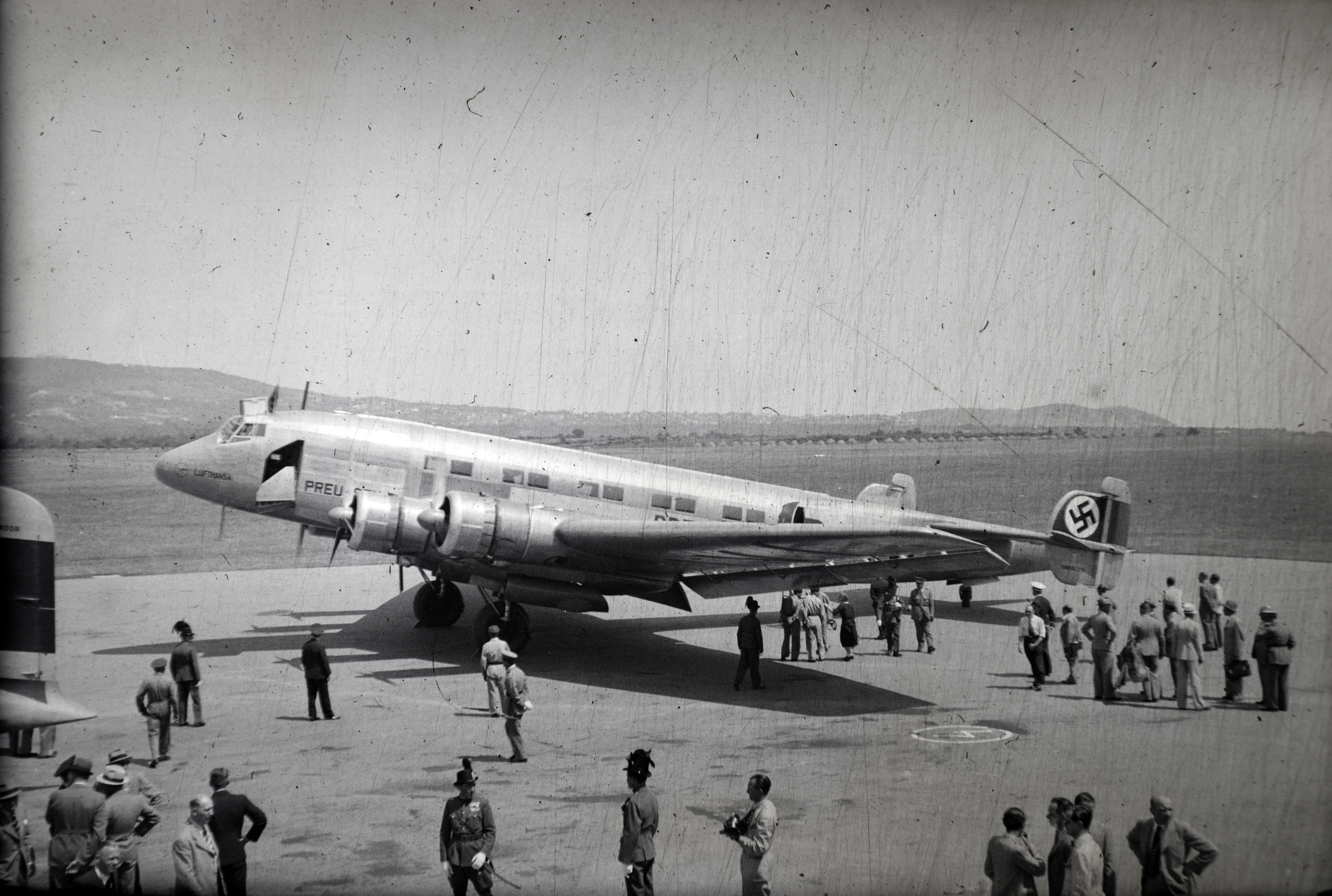
Junkers Ju 90 V2 with Lufthansa registration D-AIVI, Budaörs Airport, July 1938

During May 1938, the second prototype (V2) was delivered to Luft Hansa for flight testing. Akin to the following production standard commercial Ju 90, this aircraft was powered by four BMW 132 radial engines delivering 620 kW (830 hp). The move towards lower power has been speculated to have been necessitated by the demands on Daimler Benz to produce engines for strategically important front-line aircraft. This aircraft, named Preussen, was lost during a failed take off for tropical flight tests in November 1938 at Bathurst, Gambia.

Despite these setbacks, Luft Hansa opted to order eight production standard Ju 90A-1 aircraft. They also flew the next two prototypes, starting with V3 Bayern which flew on the Berlin-Vienna route from July 1938. This aircraft flew a total of 62,572 km (38880 mi) in 1938. Only seven of the Ju 90A-1s were ever delivered to Luft Hansa, the final in April 1940, one going directly to the Luftwaffe. Full scale passenger services were never introduced due to the outbreak of the Second World War. The airline's Ju 90s were impressed into Luftwaffe service, although two were subsequently returned to Luft Hansa.

The Ju90 attracted some interest from prospective foreign operators. South African Airways (SAA) opted to order a pair of Ju 90A-1s, powered by four Pratt & Whitney Twin Wasp engines that could produce up to 670 kW (900 hp) each. The delivery of these aircraft were scheduled to take place during the summer of 1939; however, neither aircraft were ever delivered to SAA.

During July 1941, the fourth prototype V4 entered service with the Luftwaffe; it was fitted with 980 kW (1,320 hp) Jumo 211F/L engines. On the first four Ju 90As, five pairs of rectangular windows were on each side, each double pair lighting a divided-off section of the cabin containing eight seats in facing pairs on either side of a central aisle. On the Ju 90B, whose prototypes were the Ju 90 V5 through the Ju 90 V10 aircraft, adopted round fuselage portholes instead. The Ju 90 V11 became the definitive Ju 290 prototype, featuring smaller rectangular-shaped fuselage windows.

The Ju 90B series were visually distinctive due to their oval tail fins. The Ju 90 V6 was withdrawn from test flights, and rebuilt as the Ju 390 V1 prototype. The Ju 90 V9 was also withdrawn and rebuilt as the Ju 390V2, later redesignated in October 1944 as the Ju 390A-1. The rebuilding of Ju 90 V10 into the Ju 390 V3 bomber prototype was commenced, but was ultimately scrapped at the factory in June 1944. The Junkers firm was paid compensation for seven Ju 390s that were partially constructed when the corresponding orders were cancelled.

=== Militarisation ===
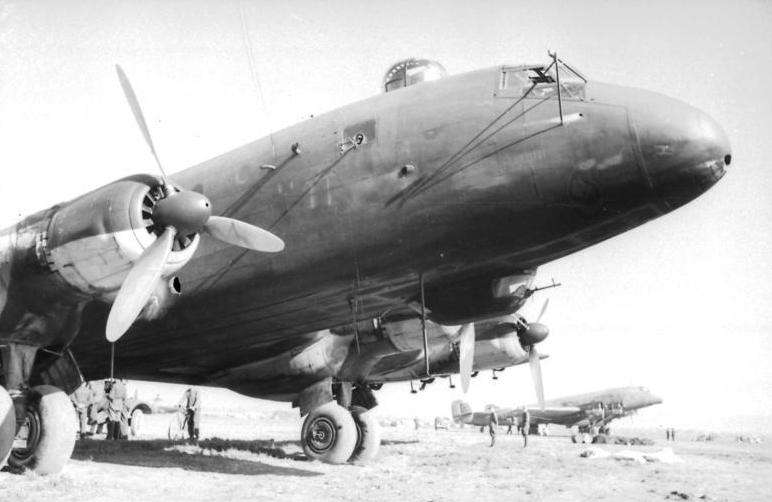
Ju 90 (probably V8) in Grosseto, 1943

In April 1939, the RLM asked Junkers for a further development of the Ju 90 for military transport purposes. The Ju 90V5 and V6 were the prototypes of this military design. They got a new wing with a straight inner section leading edge, of greater span (19%) and area (11%). The landing gear was strengthened with twin main wheels and the fins were more rounded, lacking the characteristic horn balance nick of the earlier models. The windows were replaced by 10 small portholes a side. The Ju 90 V5 flew first on 5 December 1939. A special feature of both the V5 and V6 was a powered boarding ramp in the floor of the rear section of the fuselage for loading cars and larger cargo freight. This Trapoklappe ramp, when lowered, was powerful enough to raise the fuselage to the horizontal flying position. Both aircraft were retroactively fitted with the much more powerful, unitized Kraftei-mount 1,200 kW (1,600 hp) BMW 801MA radials, with the first suffix letter "M" signifying the initial Motoranlage format of unitized powerplant installation design promulgated by the RLM. Ju 90s were also used as tugs for heavy gliders.

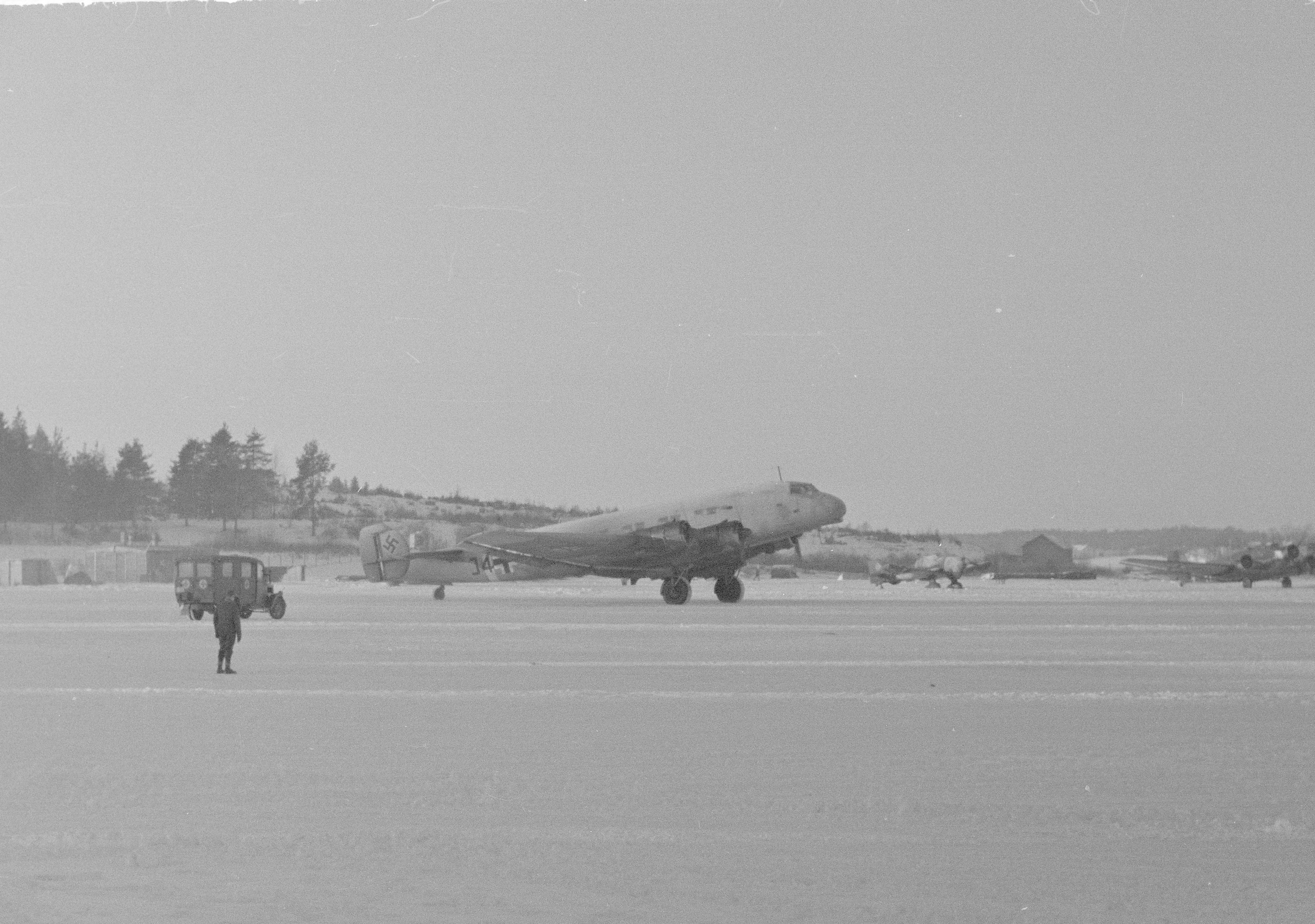
Junkers Ju 90B-1 at Helsinki-Malmi airport in January 1944.

The two last prototypes – the V7 and V8 – fed directly into the Ju 290 development programme. The former had a fuselage extension of 1.98 m (6 ft 6 in) and the addition of dihedral to the tailplane to solve a yaw instability. A reconnaissance prototype aerodynamically similar to the V7, the V8 was armed, however, with two 20 mm MG 151/20 cannons and up to nine 13 mm (.51 in) MG 131 machine guns in two dorsal, one ventral, and one tail position.

The Ju 90 was used for the first time operationally during the invasion of Norway. Operated as part of the Luftwaffe's transport force, they were deployed to the Eastern Front for a time to help supply the German 6th Army that was besieged at Stalingrad. They were subsequently transferred to the Mediterranean theatre, where they operated into late 1943.

=== Ju 290 / 390 development ===
Several Ju 90s were converted into prototypes of the Ju 290, a larger aircraft intended for transport and reconnaissance duties. The more powerful engines and other modifications to the Ju 90 V5 and V7 were steps in this direction and the latter was converted into the Ju 290 V3. The Ju 90 V8 became the second prototype Ju 290 V2. The incomplete Ju 90 V11 airframe was converted into the Ju 290 V1. The Ju 90 V6 airframe was used in the construction of the Ju 390 V1.

=== Numbers and survivors ===
Just 18 Ju 90s of all versions were completed of which two survived the war, both captured, and then scrapped shortly afterwards. The wreck of one Ju 90, which was shot down on 23 July 1943, south of Bastia, North Corsica, is accessible to scuba divers and in 2023, two-thirds of the wreck remained intact.

== Operators ==
Germany

- Luftwaffe
- Deutsche Luft Hansa

== Accidents and incidents ==
- 26 November 1938: a Deutsche Luft Hansa Ju 90V2, registration D-AIVI, named Preussen, crashed on takeoff at Bathurst (now Banjul), Gambia, while on a test flight due to double engine failure, killing 12 of the 15 people on board.
- 8 November 1940: a Deutsche Luft Hansa Ju 90A, registration D-AVMF, named Brandenburg, crashed in icing conditions at Schönteichen, Germany, killing all 29 on board.
- 9 August 1944: a Deutsche Luft Hansa Ju 90V3, registration D-AURE, named Bayern, was destroyed on the ground at Stuttgart Airport during an air raid; there was no one on board.

== Specifications (Ju 90A-1) ==
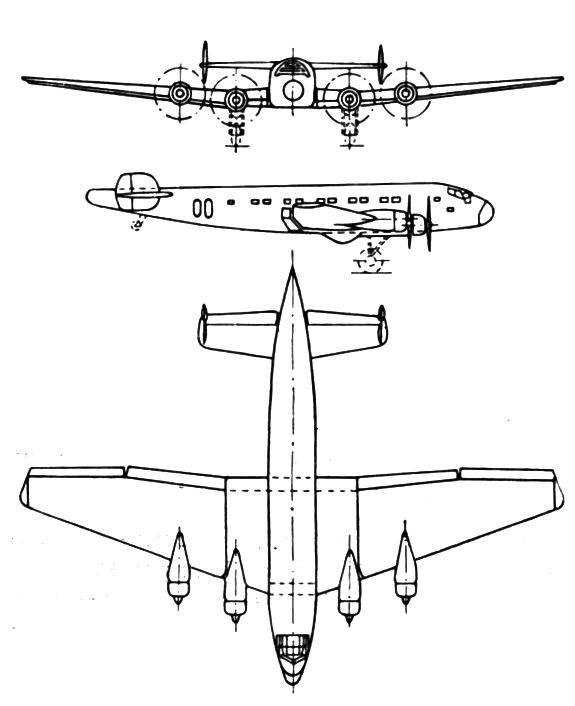
Junkers Ju 90 3-view drawing from L'Aerophile October 1937

Data from Junkers Aircraft and Engines, 1913–1945, German Aircraft of the Second World War

General characteristics

- Crew: four
- Capacity: 38–40 passengers
- Length: 26.3 m (86 ft 3 in)
- Wingspan: 35.02 m (114 ft 11 in)
- Height: 7.5 m (24 ft 7 in)
- Wing area: 184 m^{2} (1,980 sq ft)
- Empty weight: 19,225 kg (42,384 lb)
- Gross weight: 33,680 kg (74,252 lb)
- Powerplant: 4 × BMW 132 H-1 nine-cylinder air-cooled radial piston engine, 610 kW (820 hp) each
- Propellers: 3-bladed constant-speed propellers

Performance

- Maximum speed: 350 km/h (220 mph, 190 kn) at 2,500 m (8,200 ft)
- Cruise speed: 320 km/h (200 mph, 170 kn) at 3,000 m (9,800 ft)
- Landing speed: 109 km/h (68 mph; 59 kn)
- Range: 1,247 km (775 mi, 673 nmi)
- Ferry range: 2,092 km (1,300 mi, 1,130 nmi)
- Service ceiling: 5,750 m (18,860 ft)

== See also ==
Related development

- Junkers Ju 89
- Junkers Ju 290
- Junkers Ju 390

Aircraft of comparable role, configuration, and era

- Focke-Wulf Fw 200 Condor
- Bloch MB.160
- Douglas DC-4E

Related lists

- List of aircraft of World War II
- List of civil aircraft
- List of military aircraft of Germany
