= Junkers Ju 89 =

1930s German prototype heavy bomber

Ju 89
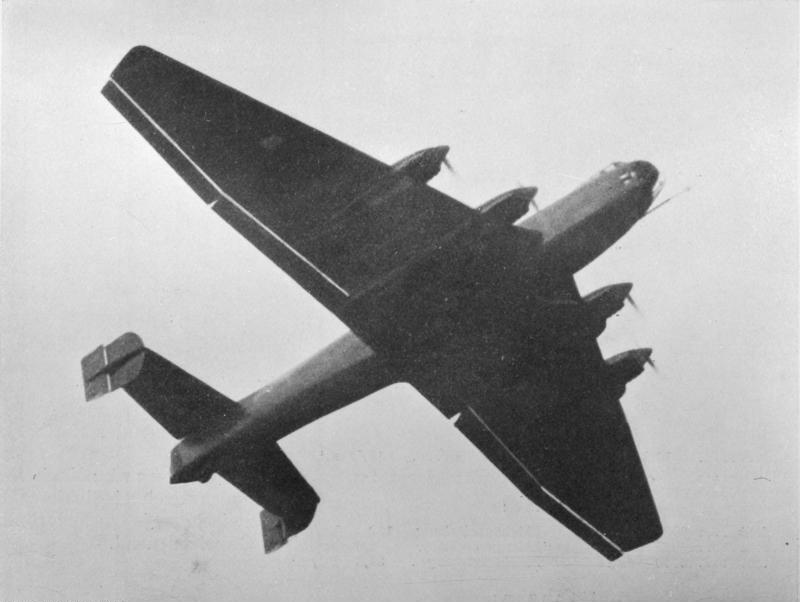
- Junkers Ju 89 in flight

General information
- Type: Heavy bomber
- Manufacturer: Junkers
- Status: Retired
- Primary user: Luftwaffe
- Number built: 2

History
- Introduction date: 1938
- First flight: 11 April 1937
- Retired: 1939
- Developed into: Junkers Ju 90

The Junkers Ju 89 was a heavy bomber designed for the Luftwaffe prior to World War II. Two prototypes were constructed, but the project was abandoned without the aircraft entering production. Elements of its design were incorporated into later Junkers aircraft.

== Development ==
From the very beginnings of the Luftwaffe in 1933, General Walther Wever, the chief of staff, realised the importance that strategic bombing would play in any future conflict. A Langstrecken-Grossbomber ("long-range big bomber") was needed to fulfill this role.

Under the Ural bomber programme, he began secret talks with two of Nazi Germany's leading aircraft manufacturers – Dornier and Junkers – requesting designs for a long-range bomber. The two companies responded with the Dornier Do 19 and the Junkers Ju 89, respectively, and the Reichsluftfahrtministerium (RLM/Reich Aviation Ministry) ordered prototypes for both aircraft in 1935. The RLM request asked for two prototypes and a prototype series of nine aircraft.

The Ju 89 and its competitor, the Dornier Do 19, proved promising, but fell victim to a change of direction within the Luftwaffe. Wever was killed in a plane crash in 1936. His successors – Albert Kesselring, Ernst Udet, and Hans Jeschonnek – favoured smaller, tactical aircraft, since they could be used to support army operations; they also did not require as much material and manpower. They were proponents of the dive bomber (Ju 87 Stuka) and the doctrine of close support and destruction of the opposing air forces on the battle-ground rather than through attacking enemy industry. They convinced Hermann Göring by emphasising the need for tactical bombers to act in an army support role. Albert Kesselring, Wever's successor, believed that what Germany required were more fighters and tactical bombers.

Kesselring and Jeschonnek had suggested to Göring that it would be better to drop heavy bomber projects due to material shortages. Around 2.5 tactical bombers could be built with the same material as one heavy bomber. In May 1937 Göring is reported as saying to Erhard Milch, 'The Führer does not ask me how big my bombers are, but how many there are'.

While these beliefs seemed validated by Germany's early successes in the Blitzkrieg, the lack of strategic bombing capability severely hampered the Luftwaffe in the Battle of Britain and Operation Barbarossa.

=== First prototype ===
On 11 April 1937, the Ju 89 prototype D-AFIT (V1, c/n 4911) was first flown by Peter Hesselbach. Just two and a half weeks after the first flight, on 29 April 1937, the further development of both the Ju 89 and the Dornier Do 19 was cancelled by the RLM. The reason for this step was the high fuel consumption of heavy bombers, as well as because a large number of bombers could only be manufactured if these bombers were medium bombers, like the Ju 88.

=== Second prototype ===
Junkers completed the second Ju 89 prototype D-ALAT July 1937. Junkers used both prototypes for extensive flight tests to get experience of the stability and flight controls of large aircraft, but the third prototype V3 was stopped after the programme was cancelled.

On 4 June 1938, Junkers achieved a new payload/altitude world record with the second prototype D-ALAT with 5,000 kg (11,000 lb) payload at an altitude of 9,312 m (30,551 ft), (4,000 m (13,000 ft) more than a Short Stirling with the same payload). On 8 June 1938, D-ALAT reached an altitude of 7,242 m (23,760 ft) with 10,000 kg (22,000 lb). In late 1938, both aircraft were transferred to the Luftwaffe, where they were used as heavy transport aircraft.

Both Ju 89 prototypes seem to have been scrapped by the end of 1939, although some sources claim that they were still in use the following year in Norway. During testing, Luft Hansa expressed an interest in an airliner to be developed from the type, which led Junkers to rebuild the incomplete third prototype as the Ju 90.

== Specifications (Ju 89 V2) ==
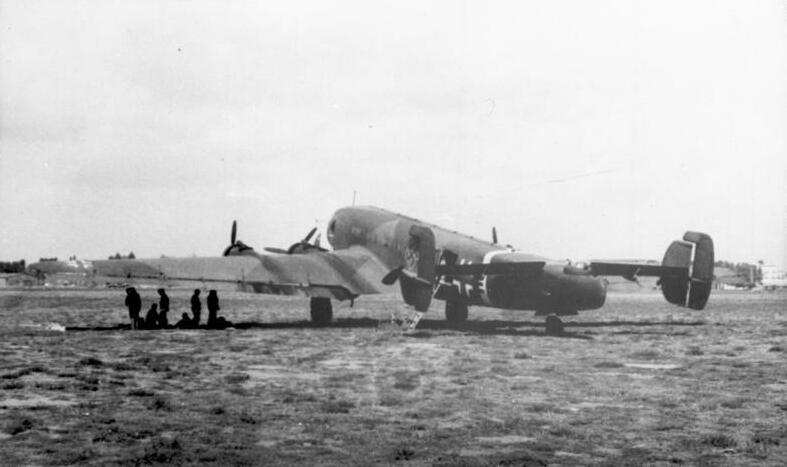

Data from The warplanes of the Third Reich

General characteristics

- Crew: 5
- Length: 26.49 m (86 ft 11 in)
- Wingspan: 35.268 m (115 ft 8.5 in)
- Height: 7.6137 m (24 ft 11.75 in)
- Wing area: 184.00 m^{2} (1,980.6 sq ft)
- Empty weight: 17,164 kg (37,840 lb)
- Gross weight: 22,800 kg (50,266 lb)
- Max takeoff weight: 27,801 kg (61,290 lb)
- Powerplant: 4 × Daimler-Benz DB 600A V-12 inverted air-cooled piston engines, 720 kW (960 hp) each for take-off
- Propellers: 3-bladed constant-speed propellers

Performance

- Maximum speed: 389.5 km/h (242.0 mph, 210.3 kn) at 5,000 m (16,400 ft)

349 km/h (217 mph; 188 kn) at sea level

- Cruise speed: 315 km/h (196 mph, 170 kn)
- Range: 1,601 km (995 mi, 865 nmi)
- Ferry range: 2,000 km (1,240 mi, 1,080 nmi)
- Service ceiling: 7,000 m (22,965 ft)

Armament
(proposed)

- 2 × 20 mm (0.787 in) MG FF cannons
- 2 × 7.92 mm (0.312 in) MG 15 machine guns
- 1,600 kg (3,500 lb) bombload

== See also ==
Related development

- Junkers Ju 90
- Junkers Ju 290
- Junkers Ju 390

Aircraft of comparable role, configuration, and era

- Boeing XB-15
- Boeing B-17 Flying Fortress
- Dornier Do 19
- Petlyakov Pe-8
- Piaggio P.50
- Piaggio P.108
- Short Stirling
- Supermarine B.12/36

Related lists

- List of military aircraft of Germany
- List of bomber aircraft
