= Walter Weaver =

Walter Weaver may refer to:

- Walter L. Weaver (1851–1909), U.S. Representative from Ohio
- Walter Weaver (footballer) (1898–1965), English footballer
- Walter Reed Weaver (1885–1944), U.S. Army general

== See also ==
- Walther Wever (disambiguation)
