= Walther Wever =

Walther Wever may refer to:

- Walther Wever (general) (1887–1936), Chief of the Luftwaffe
- Walther Wever (pilot) (1923–1945), his son, German fighter pilot
