= R74 =

R74 may refer to:

- R74 (South Africa), a road
- 2012 Washington Referendum 74
- HMS Hogue (R74), a destroyer of the Royal Navy
- R-74 Oberwiesenfeld, a former military airfield in Germany
