= 1940 Deutsche Lufthansa Ju 90 crash =

Aviation accident in Germany

Coordinates: 51.2810°N 14.0400°E

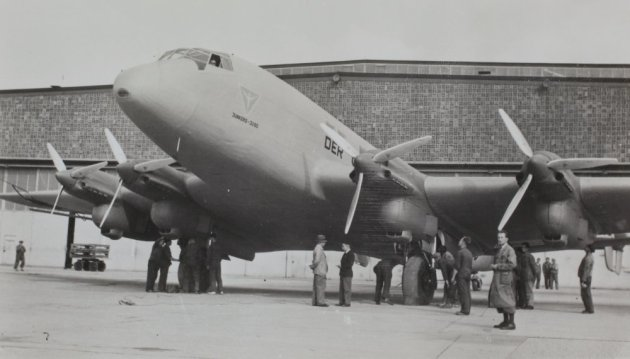
- A Junkers Ju 90, the type of aircraft that crashed

Accident
- Date: November 8, 1940
- Summary: Tail icing
- Site: Schönteichen, Bautzen, Saxony, Nazi Germany

Aircraft
- Aircraft type: Junkers Ju 90A-1
- Aircraft name: Brandenburg
- Operator: Deutsche Lufthansa
- Registration: D-AVMF
- Flight origin: Tempelhof Airport, Berlin, Germany
- Destination: Ferihegy Airport, Budapest, Hungary
- Passengers: 23
- Crew: 6
- Fatalities: 29
- Survivors: 0

On 8 November 1940, a Deutsche Lufthansa Junkers Ju 90 passenger aircraft crashed near the municipality of Schönteichen, Germany, killing all 29 people on board. An investigation of the crash concluded that the accident was caused by ice accumulation on the flight surfaces, which led to an uncontrolled loss of altitude.

== Accident ==
The aircraft, registered D-AVMF and named Brandenburg, took off from Berlin Tempelhof Airport at 14:24 with 23 passengers and six crew members. The radio operator contacted ground at 14:48, indicating that they were flying at 2,200 m (7,200 ft) in clouds. Two minutes later, he reported icing. After a final call from the aircraft at 14:58, there was no further communication from the aircraft. The Ju 90 started descending and crashed into a field. The German musician and journalist Adolf Raskin was killed in the accident.

== Investigation ==
A post-crash of the aircraft's on-board clock revealed that the crash occurred between three and five minutes after the final communication from the aircraft. Witnesses reported observing the aircraft flying at 300 metres (980 ft) or less for two to three minutes shortly before the crash, investigators concluded that the decent from 2,200 metres (7,200 ft) must have occurred very rapidly, and concluded that the descent was uncontrolled. Ice was found on the aircraft that was more than 1.5 to 2 centimetres (0.59 to 0.79 in) thick, which would have critically altered the flight characteristics of the aircraft. In instances in the type of aircraft, severe ice accumulation had been found to jam the elevators between the tail fin end cap and the outer balancer. Investigators found dents on the tail fin end cap, as well as a sheared rivet between the outer balancer and the drive shaft, which led them to conclude that the elevator control had been jammed during flight. On the other hand, the damage was also suspiciously similar to that caused by a foreign object, that was never discovered.
