= Dornier Do 19 =

German four-engine heavy bomber

Do 19
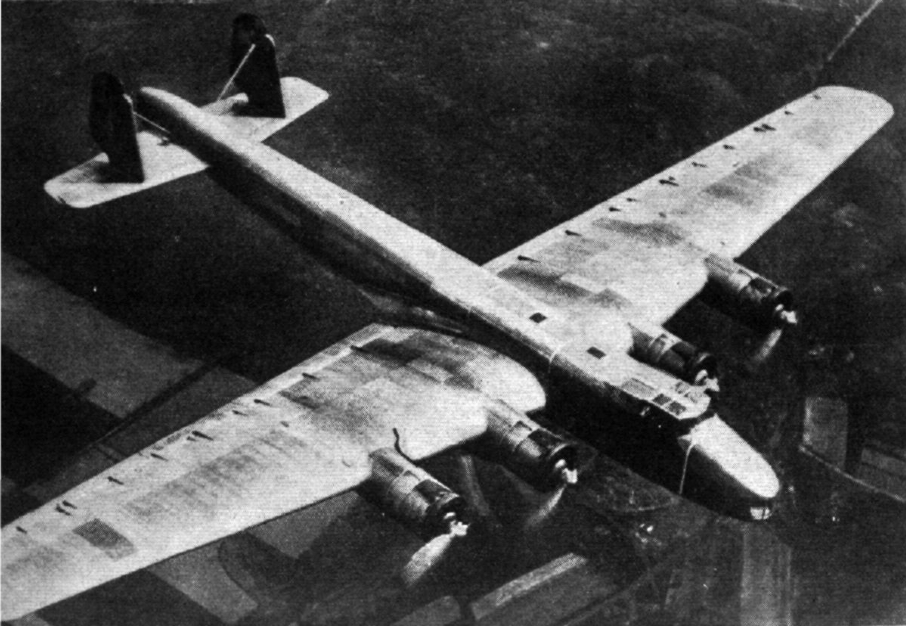
- Dornier Do 19

General information
- Type: Heavy bomber
- Manufacturer: Dornier-Werke GmbH
- Status: Cancelled
- Primary user: Luftwaffe
- Number built: 3

History
- First flight: 28 October 1936

The Dornier Do 19 was a German four-engine heavy bomber that first flew on 28 October 1936. Only one prototype flew, and it was converted to a transport in 1938. The other two were scrapped.

The Luftwaffe lacked an efficient heavy bomber fleet. Generalleutnant Walther Wever, the Luftwaffe's first Chief of Staff, was the most persistent advocate of a German long-range strategic bomber fleet. The Dornier Do 19 was built for the Luftwaffe's Ural bomber program under General Wever, competing against the Junkers Ju 89. The RLM Technisches Amt issued a specification for a four-engine heavy bomber. But after Wever's death in an airplane crash in June 1936, Wever's successor, Albert Kesselring, canceled Germany's long-range bomber projects to concentrate on tactical bombers.

Both Dornier and Junkers were competitors for the contract, and each received an order for three prototypes in late 1935. The Dornier design was given the project number Do 19, while the Junkers prototype became the Ju 89.

== Design and development ==
The Dornier Do 19 was a mid-wing cantilever design, and was mostly metal in construction. It had a rectangular-section fuselage and the tail had braced twin fins and rudders, mounted on the upper surface of the tailplane, itself set low on the rear fuselage. This was quite similar to the tail of the contemporary British Armstrong Whitworth Whitley medium bomber. It also had retractable landing gear, including the tailwheel. The powerplant, according to some sources, was supposed to be four Bramo 322H-2 radial engines that were mounted in nacelles at the leading edges of the wings.

Its crew of ten would have consisted of a pilot, co-pilot, navigator, bombardier, radio operator, and five gunners.

From late 1935, the poor promised performance of the Do 19 and competing Junkers Ju 89 resulted in the "Ural Bomber" programme being reduced to a technology demonstrator status, with Weaver losing confidence in the designs, with the Bomber A programme for a more advanced heavy bomber with much greater performance launched on 17 April 1936. The Bomber A project led to the development of the Heinkel He 177.

The V1 prototype flew on 28 October 1936. After Generalleutnant Wever died in an airplane crash on 3 June 1936, the heavy bomber program lost its momentum, and never recovered. According to the military historian Richard Suchenwirth, one of the reasons for the failure of the Luftwaffe in the air offensive against Britain, as well as for the lack of air support for the operations of the U-boat forces, was the absence of a good, reliable strategic bomber. By then, however, it was too late to develop the bombers required.

Albert Kesselring, Wever's successor, believed that what Germany required were more fighters and tactical bombers such as the Junkers Ju-88

Also Kesselring and Hans Jeschonnek had suggested to Göring that it would be better to drop heavy bomber projects due to material shortages. Around 2.5 tactical bombers could be built with the same material as one heavy bomber. In May 1937, the projects were cancelled. Erhard Milch recalled Göring saying, "The Führer does not ask me what kind of bombers I have. He simply wants to know how many!"

Therefore, the V2 and V3 prototypes were scrapped. The original V1 became a transport in 1938. The Dornier Do 19 had a disappointing performance: it was slow, carried only a 1,600 kilograms (3,500 lb) bombload, and had only medium range. In fact, the whole Ural bomber concept had already been abandoned, not only because the required range was impossible, but also because of inadequate navigation and bombsights.

== Specifications (Do 19 V2) ==
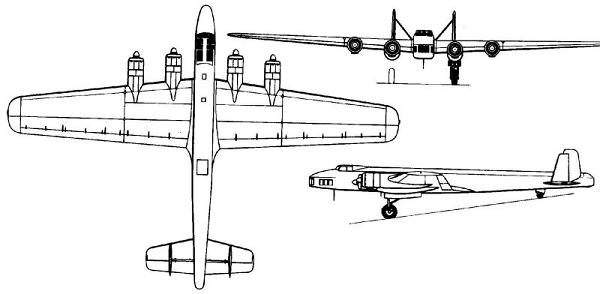
Dornier Do-19 Technical Specs.

Data from Aircraft of the Third Reich Volume one.

General characteristics

- Crew: 10, pilot, co-pilot, navigator, bombardier, radio operator and five gunners
- Length: 25.45 m (83 ft 6 in)
- Wingspan: 35 m (114 ft 10 in)
- Height: 5.76 m (18 ft 11 in)
- Wing area: 160.2 m^{2} (1,724 sq ft)
- Empty weight: 11,865 kg (26,158 lb)
- Max takeoff weight: 18,500 kg (40,786 lb)
- Powerplant: 4 × Bramo 322H-2 9-cylinder air-cooled radial piston engines, 533 kW (715 hp) each for take-off

447 kW (599 hp) maximum continuous power

- Propellers: 3-bladed variable-pitch propellers

Performance

- Maximum speed: 315 km/h (196 mph, 170 kn) at sea level at 18,000 kg (40,000 lb)
- Cruise speed: 250 km/h (160 mph, 130 kn) at 2,000 m (6,600 ft)
- Range: 1,600 km (990 mi, 860 nmi)
- Service ceiling: 5,600 m (18,400 ft)
- Time to altitude: 2,000 m (6,600 ft) in 30 minutes 30 seconds
- Wing loading: 114 kg/m^{2} (23 lb/sq ft)
- Power/mass: 0.13 kW/kg (0.079 hp/lb)

Armament

- 1 × 7.92 mm (0.312 in) MG 15 machine gun in nose
- 1 × 7.92 mm (0.312 in) MG 15 machine gun in tail
- 1 × 20 mm (0.787 in) cannon in dorsal turret
- 1 × 20 mm (0.787 in) cannon in ventral turret
- 16 × 100 kg (220 lb) bombs

== See also ==
Aircraft of comparable role, configuration, and era

- Boeing XB-15
- Boeing B-17 Flying Fortress
- Handley Page H.P.54 Harrow
- Junkers Ju 89
- Petlyakov Pe-8
- Piaggio P.50
- Piaggio P.108
- Short Stirling

Related lists

- List of interwar military aircraft
- List of military aircraft of Germany

== Bibliography ==
- Hooton, E. R. (1994). Phoenix Triumphant: The Rise and Rise of the Luftwaffe. London: Arms & Armour Press. ISBN 1-85409-181-6.
- Zuerl, Walter (1941). Deutsche Flugzeug Konstrukteure. München, Germany: Curt Pechstein Verlag.
