= Kurt Weigelt =

German businessman (1884–1968)

Kurt Weigelt (5 June 1884 – 5 August 1968) was a German business manager of Lufthansa and Deutsche Bank, and a Nazi war criminal sentenced to two years in prison for being a supporting member of the SS.

From after World War I, Weigelt was in Deutsche Bank management becoming a deputy director in 1922. He was also involved in commercial aviation, he was instrumental in the founding of Deutsche Luft Hansa by the merger of several existing German airlines.

Weigelt was a Förderndes Mitglied der SS from 1934, financially supporting the SS. He led the Nazi Reichsgruppe Deutscher Kolonialwirtschaftlicher Unternehmungen (Reich Group of German Colonial Economic Enterprises) from its establishment in 1936. From 1937 he was a member of the Nazi Party.

Weigelt officially was the head of the economic department of NSDAP Office of Colonial Policy. Unofficially, Weigelt was regarded as "secret minister of Colonies". He prepared the Wirtschaftspolitische Denkschrift des Kolonialpolitischen Amtes der NSDAP (Economic policy memorandum of the Colonial Political Office of the NSDAP) memorandum with plans on how to plunder Africa. Scholar Werner Ustorf describes Weigelt's colonial plans as amounting to compulsory labour and camp settlements.

After the end of the Second World War, he was placed on a list of 42 people from industry who were wanted as war criminals. He was arrested and sentenced to two years in prison and a fine of 50,000 Reichsmark.

Due to his role in the Nazi administration and war crimes, Deutsche Bank was unable to employ him directly after the war, however he was given a key role in the reestablishment of Lufthansa, with which the bank had a close business relationship, becoming chairman. Weigelt was chairman of Lufthansa's supervisory board from its reestablishment in 1953 (as Luftag, renamed Lufthansa in 1954) and until 1960, and served as honorary president of Lufthansa until his death in 1968.
