= Arado V I =

V I
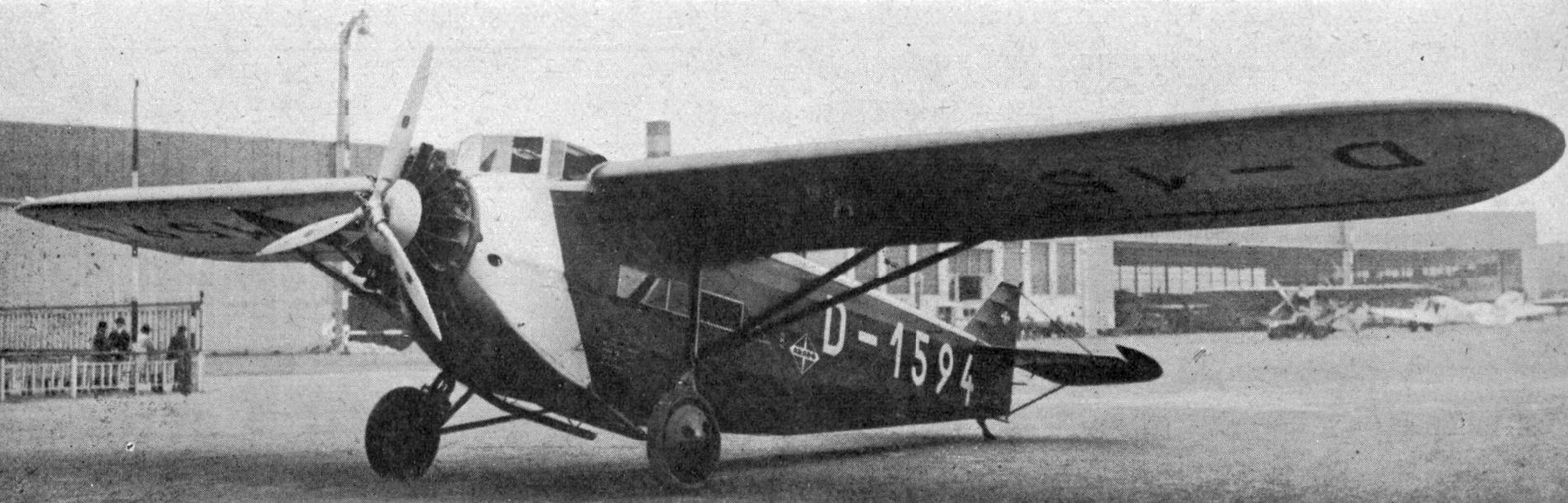

General information
- Type: Airliner
- Manufacturer: Arado Flugzeugwerke
- Status: Destroyed
- Primary user: Deutsche Luft Hansa
- Number built: 1

History
- First flight: 1927

The Arado V.1 was a prototype airliner, built in Germany in 1927. It was a single-engine, high-wing braced monoplane with tailwheel undercarriage. It made several long-distance flights, including carrying mail to South America, before being exhibited in Berlin in 1929, when it was bought by Deutsche Luft Hansa.

== Operational history ==
The sole V.I (D-1594), took part in the 1928 Berlin ILA-exhibition and was subsequently sold to Deutsche Luft Hansa (DLH) in the autumn of 1929 and named Tenerife on 12 December 1929. After a successful proving flight to Tenerife, the aircraft crashed near Berlin, on 19 December 1929, during its return flight, killing both pilots, though the mechanic survived.

== Variants ==
Data from: German Aviation 1919-1945:Arado V.I

V.I
A single aircraft, (D-1594), sold to DLH.
V.Ia
The second aircraft, scrapped uncompleted, after DLH withdrew funding on the crash of the V.I.

== Specifications (V.I) ==
Data from Jane's all the World's Aircraft 1928.

General characteristics

- Crew: 2
- Capacity: 4 pax
- Length: 12 m (39 ft 4 in)
- Wingspan: 18 m (59 ft 1 in)
- Height: 3.15 m (10 ft 4 in)
- Wing area: 47.24 m^{2} (508.5 sq ft)
- Empty weight: 1,350 kg (2,976 lb)
- Gross weight: 2,350 kg (5,181 lb)
- Fuel capacity: 585 L (155 US gal; 129 imp gal)
- Powerplant: 1 × BMW licence-built Pratt & Whitney Hornet 9-cylinder air-cooled radial piston engine, 370 kW (500 hp)

Performance

- Maximum speed: 200 km/h (120 mph, 110 kn)
- Range: 2,000 km (1,200 mi, 1,100 nmi)
- Service ceiling: 4,000 m (13,000 ft)
- Wing loading: 50 kg/m^{2} (10 lb/sq ft)
- Power/mass: 0.1596 kW/kg (0.0971 hp/lb)
