= Ural bomber =

1930s German aircraft design program

The Ural bomber was the initial aircraft design program/competition to develop a long-range bomber for the Luftwaffe, created and led by General Walther Wever in the early 1930s. Wever died in an air crash on June 3, 1936, and his successor Albert Kesselring continued the project until he left office.

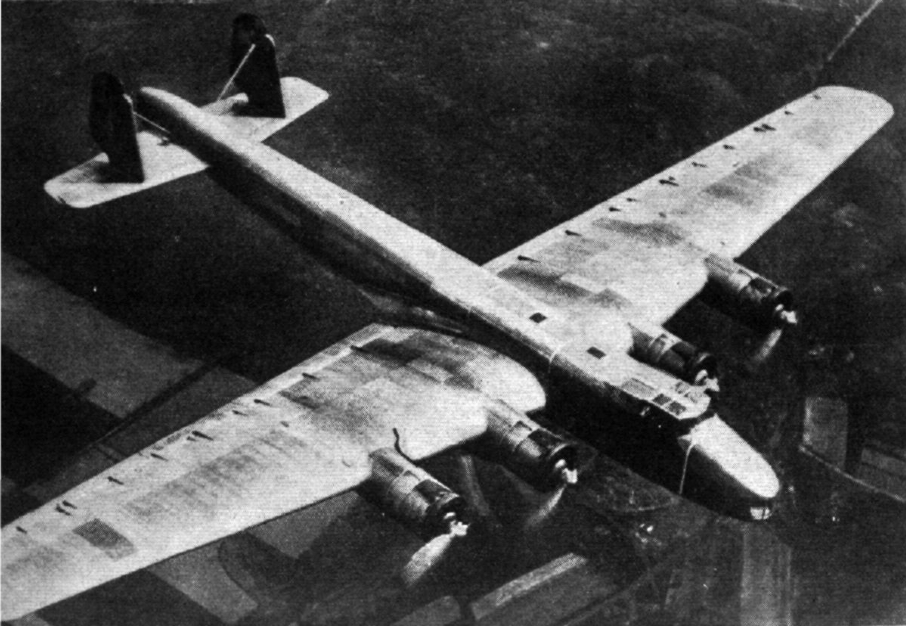
One of the Dornier Do 19 prototypes in flight

Wever, the chief of staff of the newly formed Luftwaffe in 1933, realized the importance that strategic bombing would play in a war. In a war with the Soviet Union, he expected that German forces would not attempt to move very far east of Moscow, which would leave much of Joseph Stalin's recently relocated industry out of reach of existing bombers. Wever proposed using a strategic bomber to target those factories, hampering the Soviet ability to fight, without the need for ground forces to advance.

== Development ==
Under the Ural bomber program, he engaged in secret talks with Dornier and Junkers, requesting designs for a long-range bomber. They responded with the Dornier Do 19 and the Junkers Ju 89. The Reich Ministry of Aviation (RLM; Reichsluftfahrtministerium) ordered prototypes of both aircraft in 1935. The program was not successful and was eventually canceled.

The Dornier Do 19 V1 first flew on October 28, 1936, some six months before the Ju 89. It was a nine-seat, four-engine monoplane, powered by four BMW/Bramo 322H nine-cylinder radials of only some 650 hp output each. The Do 19 V1 had dorsal and ventral defensive armament using turrets for the first time on a German bomber in such locations — these innovations could not save the design, and only the V1 prototype was completed.

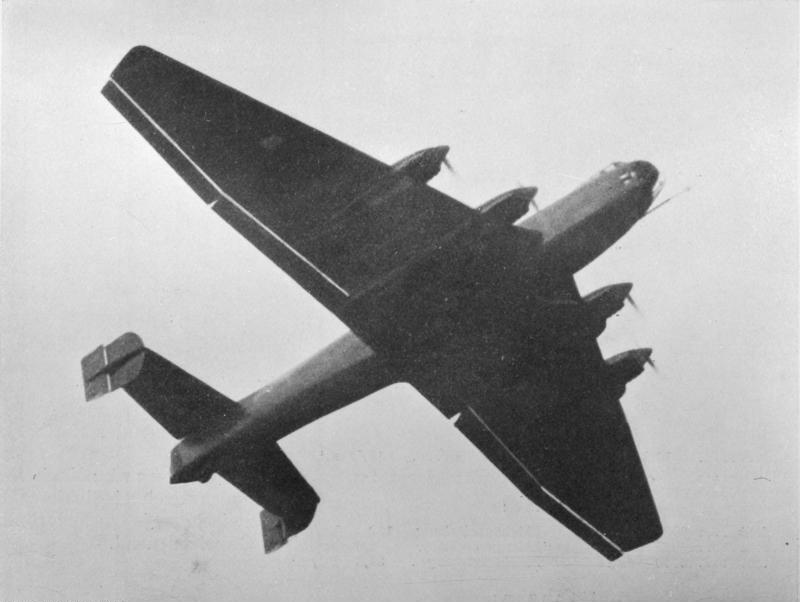
A Junkers Ju 89 prototype in flight

When the Ural bomber program was canceled, the partially completed 3rd prototype was converted to passenger layout and served as a Ju 90 prototype instead. The Ju 90 was later pressed into military service as a patrol aircraft, as it was one of the few long-range designs available in Germany. The Ju 90, in turn, led to the small-production series of Junkers Ju 290 four engined maritime patrol and long-range reconnaissance aircraft.

== Cancellation ==
James Corum contends that it was not Kesselring who cancelled the Ural bomber project; rather it was Hermann Göring who halted strategic bomber development before the start of World War II, following the advice of Kesselring, Ernst Udet and Erhard Milch. Milch wanted the project cancelled simply because at that stage the German airplane industry was incapable of building a large fleet of heavy bombers and would remain so. Thus, Göring shelved the project and is later supposed to have said, "The Führer will never ask me how big our bombers are, but how many we have."

However, after pleas from the Chief of Branch 1 of the Luftwaffe Operations Staff, Major Paul Deichmann, to Göring, an about face occurred in late 1937, when specifications were issued to develop an aircraft to deliver a five-ton bomb load to New York. By March 1942, the Amerika Bomber project was initiated as a resuscitation of the Ural Bomber idea, with the Messerschmitt Me 264, Junkers Ju 390 the Heinkel He 277 becoming the major competitors.

As 1943 progressed, Göring bemoaned the lack of a heavy bomber fleet and cursed those who had told him the medium bomber was superior to the heavy bomber. "Well, those inferior heavy bombers of the other side are doing a wonderful job of wrecking Germany from end to end," was his response. — but since the A-version of Heinkel's "heavy" had the Daimler-Benz DB 606 and 610 powerplants weighing around 1.5 tonnes each. The Greif also had inadequately designed and engine accommodation for such complex and heavy "power systems" to operate safely within them. One month later, in September 1942, Göring cancelled the dive-bombing requirement for the He 177A, which had proven to be an unrealistic demand. The He 177B development of the A-version was an attempt to match the capability of the Allies' four-engined strategic bombers, and was well underway by the summer of 1943. Four prototypes of the Daimler-Benz DB 603-powered B-version were commissioned, with three of them built and two flying by the end of 1943.

The He 177B, the later Heinkel He 274 high-altitude design, and, by February 1943, the paper-only Heinkel He 277 Bomber (Heinkel's trans-Atlantic design project), formed a trio of development programs emerging from the He 177A design, each entirely separate from the others — came the closest to providing the Luftwaffe with a true heavy bomber from the Heinkel firm's engineering departments. The original He 177A design was the basis for the He 177B and He 274 and the initial inspiration for the BMW 801 radial powered He 277, whose design resembled an enlarged Heinkel He 219.. The prototypes of the first three He 177B prototypes were conversions of four He 177As and were built in Austria. A pair of He 274 prototypes were to be built in France. Both the quartet of commissioned He 177B prototype airframes and pair of He 274 prototypes had four individual Daimler-Benz DB 603 engines, with the 274's powerplants having additional turbocharging for high-altitude flight. These would have provided the Luftwaffe with a bombing capability on par with RAF Bomber Command's Avro Lancaster.

The offensive against Germany's petroleum, oil and lubricant resources and infrastructure effectively ended any hope of supporting a strategic bombing capability. By early July 1944 the Jägernotprogramm ended all development of German military aircraft not capable of defensive purposes, focusing solely on fighter designs.

== See also ==
- List of German aircraft projects, 1939–45
- List of World War II military aircraft of Germany
- Ural Mountains in Nazi planning
