= Walther Wever (pilot) =

German Luftwaffe fighter ace (1923–1945)

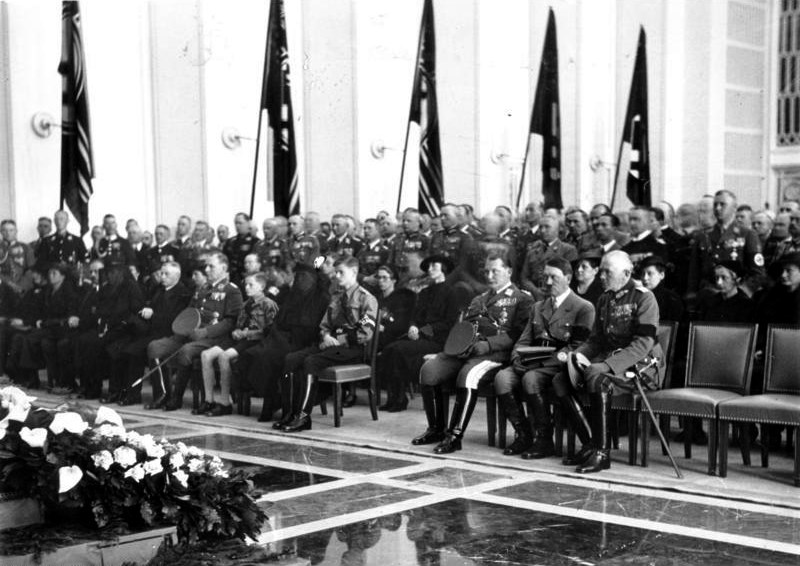
- Wever attending his father's funeral in Berlin
- Born: 16 January 1923; München, Germany
- Died: 10 April 1945 (aged 22); Near Neuruppin, Germany
- Cause of death: Killed in action
- Relatives: Walther Wever (father)
- Military career
- Allegiance: Nazi Germany
- Branch: Luftwaffe
- Service years: 1942–1945
- Rank: Oberleutnant (first lieutenant)
- Units: JG 51; JG 7
- Awards: Knight's Cross of the Iron Cross

Walther Wever (16 January 1923 – 10 April 1945) was a Luftwaffe flying ace during the Second World War. The son of former Chief of the Luftwaffe General Walther Wever, Wever served during 1943 on the Eastern Front and from 19 June 1943 until 10 April 1945 he claimed 44 aerial victories in 250 combat missions. He was also a recipient of the Knight's Cross of the Iron Cross.

== Early life and career ==
Wever was born on 16 January 1923 in Munich in the Weimar Republic, the son of Generalleutnant Walther Wever. Joining the Luftwaffe in 1942 and following flight training in mid-1943, (Note: Flight training in the Luftwaffe progressed through the levels A1, A2 and B1, B2, referred to as A/B flight training. A training included theoretical and practical training in aerobatics, navigation, long-distance flights and dead-stick landings. The B courses included high-altitude flights, instrument flights, night landings and training to handle the aircraft in difficult situations.) he was posted to 3. Staffel (3rd squadron) of Jagdgeschwader 51 (JG 51—51st Fighter Wing). At the time, 3. Staffel was commanded by Hauptmann Heinz Lange and was subordinated to I. Gruppe (1st group) of JG 51 headed by Major Erich Leie and stationed at an airfield named Orel-Slobodka located approximately 20 kilometers (12 miles) west-southwest of Oryol on the Eastern Front.

== World War II ==
World War II in Europe had begun on Friday, 1 September 1939, when German forces invaded Poland. In June 1943, Wever fought in the offensive operations leading up to Operation Citadel, which initiated the Battle of Kursk. Here he claimed his first aerial victory on 19 June south of Karachev, approximately 45 kilometers (28 miles) west of Oryol. Depending on source, the aircraft shot down was either a Yakovlev Yak-1 fighter, or a Douglas A-20 Havoc bomber.

On 1 August during the Battle of Kursk, I. Gruppe moved to an airfield at Bryansk where they stayed until 9 August. While based at Bryansk, Wever claimed five aerial victories, including four Ilyushin Il-2 ground-attack aircraft and a single A-20 bomber, also known as "Boston". From 15 to 30 August, Wever was temporarily placed in command of 3. Staffel, stepping in for Lange who had briefly replaced Leie as commander of I. Gruppe. On 29 August, I. Gruppe had moved to an airfield at Shatalovka, staying here until 15 September. Flying from Shatalovka, Wever took his total of aerial victories claimed to 16. For this, he had been awarded both classes of the Iron Cross (Eisernes Kreuz).

In early February 1944, I. Gruppe was briefly withdrawn from combat operations and moved to an airfield at Dęblin-Irena, located approximately 50 kilometers (31 miles) northwest of Lublin, for conversion from the Focke-Wulf Fw 190 to the Messerschmitt Bf 109 G-6. Elements of the Gruppe returned to Babruysk in late February. On 29 March, the Gruppe relocated to Orsha. That day, Wever became an "ace-in-a-day" when he claimed five aerial victories. On 20 March, he had been awarded the German Cross in Gold (Deutsches Kreuz in Gold).

=== Squadron leader ===
On 7 May 1944, Weaver was appointed Staffelkapitän (squadron leader) of 3. Staffel of JG 51, succeeding Lange who was transferred. On 21 June, bombers of the Eighth Air Force on a shuttle bombing mission of Operation Frantic, attacked oil refineries south of Berlin before heading for the Poltava Air Base. The bombers were intercepted by elements of JG 51 led by Major Fritz Losigkeit. In this encounter, two of the escorting North American P-51 Mustang fighters were shot down, including one by Wever. (Note: According to Weal, Wever shot down a Boeing B-17 Flying Fortress bomber.) One of the P-51 fighters crashed near the Luftwaffe airfield at Babruysk where III. Gruppe of JG 51 was based. In its cockpit, a map of the Poltava Air Base was found. The Gruppenkommandeur (group commander) of III. Gruppe, Hauptmann Diethelm von Eichel-Streiber, sent the map to the headquarters of Luftflotte 6 (6th Air Fleet). This intelligence led to an attack by Luftwaffe bombers which destroyed 44 parked Boeing B-17 Flying Fortress bombers and damaged further 26. On 10 July, Wever was shot down and wounded in his Bf 109 G-6 (Werknummer 410413—factory number) by Soviet Anti-aircraft artillery. Command of 3. Staffel was then passed to Oberleutnant Günther Josten.

Although he lost a foot, Wever continued to fly and was awarded the Knight's Cross of the Iron Cross (Ritterkreuz des Eisernen Kreuzes) on 28 January 1945 for reaching the final total of 44 victories. He was then transferred to Jagdgeschwader 7 (JG 7—7th Fighter Wing), the first jet fighter wing, where he received further training on the Messerschmitt Me 262 jet fighter. On 10 April 1945, having not scored another kill, Wever was shot down and killed in action by Allied fighters near Neuruppin. That day, the Luftwaffe lost a number of Me 262 pilots, including Hauptmann Franz Schall. The Americans dubbed this day the "great jet massacre".

== Summary of career ==
=== Aerial victory claims ===
According to Obermaier, Wever was credited with 44 aerial victories all but one claimed on the Eastern Front in 250 combat missions. Matthews and Foreman, authors of Luftwaffe Aces — Biographies and Victory Claims, researched the German Federal Archives and found records for 44 aerial victory claims with 43 claimed on the Eastern Front and one on the Western Front.

Victory claims were logged to a map-reference (PQ = Planquadrat), for example "PQ 35 Ost 43231". The Luftwaffe grid map (Jägermeldenetz) covered all of Europe, western Russia and North Africa and was composed of rectangles measuring 15 minutes of latitude by 30 minutes of longitude, an area of about 360 square miles (930 km^{2}). These sectors were then subdivided into 36 smaller units to give a location area 3 km × 4 km (1.9 mi × 2.5 mi) in size.

Chronicle of aerial victories
This and the ♠ (Ace of spades) indicates those aerial victories which made Wever an "ace-in-a-day", a term which designates a fighter pilot who has shot down five or more airplanes in a single day. This and the ? (question mark) indicates information discrepancies listed by Prien, Stemmer, Rodeike, Balke, Bock, Mathews and Foreman.
Claim	Date	Time	Type	Location	Claim	Date	Time	Type	Location
– 3. Staffel of Jagdgeschwader 51 "Mölders" – Eastern Front — 4 February – 31 December 1943
1	19 June 1943	07:30	Yak-1? (Note: According to Mathews and Foreman claimed as a Douglas A-20 Havoc.)	PQ 35 Ost 43231; 5 km (3.1 mi) southwest of Tschaikowka	13	5 September 1943	17:55	Il-2 m.H. (Note: The "m.H." refers to an Ilyushin Il-2 with rear gunner (mit Heckschütze).)	PQ 35 Ost 25462; 25 km (16 mi) west-northwest of Mariampol
2	1 August 1943	17:10	Il-2 m.H.	PQ 35 Ost 54732 vicinity of Znamenskoje	14	5 September 1943	17:59	Il-2 m.H.	PQ 35 Ost 25466; 20 km (12 mi) west-northwest of Yelnya
3	2 August 1943	08:08	Il-2 m.H.	PQ 35 Ost 53472; 10 km (6.2 mi) northeast of Orsha	15	14 September 1943	12:20	Il-2 m.H.	northeast of Dukhovshchina
4	2 August 1943	18:32	Il-2 m.H.	PQ 35 Ost 54751; 15 km (9.3 mi) southwest of Tschaikowka	16	14 September 1943	15:09	LaGG-3	PQ 35 Ost 26393 vicinity of Beloi
5	3 August 1943	11:46	Il-2 m.H.	PQ 35 Ost 54554; 15 km (9.3 mi) south of Dudorovskiy	17	30 September 1943	09:56	Il-2 m.H.	east of Tuberizur
6	3 August 1943	12:32	Boston	PQ 35 Ost 53292; 15 km (9.3 mi) north-northeast of Kromy	18	30 September 1943	09:57	Il-2 m.H.	east of Tuberizur
7	14 August 1943	17:57	Il-2 m.H.	PQ 35 Ost 51852; 15 km (9.3 mi) east of Bohodukhiv	19	30 October 1943	07:15	Il-2 m.H.	southwest of Krijewka
8	20 August 1943	14:20	LaGG-3	PQ 35 Ost 51524 vicinity of Kirkowka	20	30 November 1943	12:40	Yak-9	northeast of Zhlobin
9	30 August 1943	17:43	Il-2 m.H.	west of Yelnya	21	15 December 1943	12:45	Il-2 m.H.	PQ 25 Ost 93438; 20 km (12 mi) south-southwest of Zhlobin
10	30 August 1943	18:05	Il-2 m.H.	north of Yelnya	22	15 December 1943	13:05	Yak-9	PQ 35 Ost 03311; 20 km (12 mi) south of Zhlobin
11	1 September 1943	18:08	Il-2	west of Yelnya	23	23 December 1943	13:55	Il-2 m.H.	PQ 35 Ost 03127; 10 km (6.2 mi) west of Gorodets
12	5 September 1943	17:54	Il-2 m.H.	PQ 35 Ost 25465; 20 km (12 mi) west-northwest of Yelnya					
– 3. Staffel of Jagdgeschwader 51 "Mölders" – Eastern Front — 1 January – 10 July 1944
24	4 January 1944	12:40	Yak-9	PQ 25 Ost N/96693; 20 km (12 mi) northwest of Vitebsk	35♠	29 March 1944	16:39	Yak-9	PQ 35 Ost N/04462; 20 km (12 mi) south of Chavusy
25	6 January 1944	10:39	Il-2	PQ 35 Ost N/06783; 15 km (9.3 mi) southeast of Kamary	36	28 May 1944	07:08	Yak-7	PQ 25 Ost N/96366; 15 km (9.3 mi) northwest of Dretun
26	6 January 1944	10:40	Il-2	PQ 35 Ost N/06786; 15 km (9.3 mi) southeast of Kamary	37	21 June 1944	12:53	P-51	PQ 25 Ost N/23881 vicinity of Halászi
27	12 January 1944	11:54	La-5	PQ 25 Ost N/96962; 20 km (12 mi) northwest of Vitebsk	38	22 June 1944	07:35	Yak-9	PQ 25 Ost N/96599; 30 km (19 mi) west of Kėdainiai
28	14 January 1944	09:11	Il-2 m.H.	PQ 35 Ost N/05132; 25 km (16 mi) southeast of Kamary	39	23 June 1944	14:00	Yak-7	PQ 35 Ost N/05896; 20 km (12 mi) east-southeast of Ulla
29	14 January 1944	09:12	Il-2 m.H.	PQ 35 Ost N/05121; 15 km (9.3 mi) west-southwest of Liozna	40	24 June 1944	18:00	Il-2 m.H.	PQ 25 Ost N/96585; 10 km (6.2 mi) north of Ulla
30	14 January 1944	13:57	Il-2	PQ 35 Ost N/05133; 25 km (16 mi) southeast of Kamary	41	25 June 1944	11:55	Yak-7	PQ 35 Ost N/05375
31♠	29 March 1944	12:10	La-5	PQ 35 Ost N/04481; 30 km (19 mi) east of Stara Bychow	42	25 June 1944	12:04	Il-2 m.H.	PQ 35 Ost N/05382
32♠	29 March 1944	12:24	Il-2	PQ 35 Ost N/04451; 25 km (16 mi) southwest of Chavusy	43	29 June 1944	16:25	La-5	PQ 25 Ost N/94134; 15 km (9.3 mi) north-northeast of Byerazino
33♠	29 March 1944	16:22	Pe-2	PQ 35 Ost N/04289; 10 km (6.2 mi) east of Chavusy	44	30 June 1944	13:24	La-5	PQ 25 Ost N/94317; 15 km (9.3 mi) south-southeast of Byerazino
34♠	29 March 1944	16:30	Pe-2	PQ 35 Ost N/04442; 20 km (12 mi) northeast of Stara Bychow					

=== Awards and decorations ===
- Iron Cross (1939) 2nd and 1st Class
- Honor Goblet of the Luftwaffe (Ehrenpokal der Luftwaffe) on 17 April 1944 as Leutnant and pilot (Note: According to Obermaier on 20 March 1944.)
- German Cross in Gold on 20 March 1944 as Leutnant in the I./Jagdgeschwader 51
- Knight's Cross of the Iron Cross on 28 January 1945 as Leutnant and pilot in the 3./Jagdgeschwader 51 "Mölders"
