= Oberwiesenfeld Army Airfield =

Former military airfield in Munich, Germany

Oberwiesenfeld Army Airfield AAF Station Oberwiesenfeld Advanced Landing Ground (ALG) R-74 Flugplatz Oberwiesenfeld
- Oberwiesenfeld AAF (Germany)

Site information
- Type: Airfield

Location
- Coordinates: 48°10′12″N 011°33′06″E

Site history
- In use: 1909-1968
- Battles/wars: Western Front (World War II)

Oberwiesenfeld Army Airfield is a former military airfield, located in Munich, Bavaria, Germany.

== History ==
Military use of Oberwiesenfeld can be traced to about 1784 when Electoral Bavarian artillery units which used the field as a training ground. It was used as an artillery training site and as a training area by the Bavarian Army throughout the 19th century.

As early as the late 19th century the Oberwiesenfeld was used as a landing area for hot air balloons and airships, both military and civilian. From 1909 onwards the field was also used as an airfield. On 1 January 1912 the field served as the founding place for the Royal Bavarian Flying Corps (German: Königlich Bayerische Fliegertruppe). The unit moved out to Oberschleißheim three months later. Because the field was also used as an exercise field for the Bavarian Cavalry, military exercises and aircraft movements could not occur at the same time. This was not resolved until 1925, when a permanent runway was constructed. The runway became necessary because in 1920 passenger traffic began in earnest with flying services to Augsburg and Berlin. A year later a service to Konstanz was added.

In 1927 the City of Munich proposed to upgrade the airfield to primary airport. North of the Nymphenburg-Biedensteiner Canal was to become the airport, south of it was to remain the military exercise area. The first wooden buildings were built for the handling of passengers and freight in 1929, soon followed by a hangar. With the construction of a flight handling building the airport became a full airport in 1931. It remained in use as the Munich municipal airport until 1939, after which it was relieved by the newer and much larger Munich-Riem Airport. In its final year as an airport, it was used by British Prime Minister Neville Chamberlain and French Prime Minister Edouard Daladier, who tried to negotiate a peace with Adolf Hitler with the 1938 Munich Agreement.

== United States control ==
The airport was not used by the Luftwaffe during World War II. When Munich was seized by the United States Army during the Western Allied invasion of Germany in April 1945, the airfield was repaired by IX Engineering Command, Ninth Air Force and designated an Army Air Forces advanced Landing Ground, R-74. IX Air Service Command units used the airfield as a casualty evacuation and combat resupply airfield for only a few days until the German capitulation on 8 May. The field was transferred to Air Service Command and the Air Force designated it as Oberwiesenfeld Signal Depot, under the jurisdiction of the 10th Air Supply Squadron.

Oberwiesenfeld was transferred to control of the United States Army on 1 April 1948, it being re-designated as Oberwiesenfeld Army Airfield. Around 1950/1955 a helicopter unit with H-19's was stationed there. It was used as a military airfield by the US Army until October 1957, although the United States Radio Free Europe/Radio Liberty broadcast from the former airport terminal from 1953 until 1968 when it was moved to other facilities. Known US Army units assigned were:

- 1 Jul 1946 HHC CC "A" 4th ArmdDiv renamed HHT 2nd Con Bde; HQ Flight located in Oberwiesenfeld 1946
- 1946 925 Sig Co renamed Earding Air Depot Signals Div
- 24 Nov 1950 2nd Constabulary Bde
- 15 Dec 1952 HQ Flight in Oberwiesenfeld
- May 1955 5 Cessna L-19's stationed at Oberwiesenfeld, unit unknown

Civilian flying returned in 1955, co-using the airfield, and later taking over completely with the US releasing the airport to German civil control. Parts of the airfield were used for trade fairs of construction companies until 1966, after which they moved to the new Munich Messe.

== Olympics ==
All flying ended in 1968 for the construction of the 1972 Munich Olympics facilities, the former airfield was completely removed and the land re-engineered as the Olympiapark.
