= Deutsche Luft Hansa =

1926–1945 German flag carrier airline

- Founded: 6 January 1926; 100 years ago
- Commenced operations: 6 April 1926; 100 years ago
- Ceased operations: 22 April 1945; 81 years ago
- Hubs: Berlin–Tempelhof
- Secondary hubs: Cologne–Butzweilerhof; Frankfurt; Leipzig/Halle; Hamburg; Munich–Oberwiesenfeld
- Headquarters: Berlin, Germany
- Key people: Kurt Weigelt

Deutsche Luft Hansa A.G. (from 1933 styled as Deutsche Lufthansa and also known as Luft Hansa, Lufthansa, or DLH) was a German airline, established in 1926. It served as the flag carrier of the country during the later years of the Weimar Republic and throughout the era of Nazi Germany, when it had close links to the Nazi Party. It ceased operations in April 1945, in the final stages of the Second World War.

Although Deutsche Luft Hansa was the forerunner of modern German airline Lufthansa (founded in 1953) and both airlines share the same logo, there is no legal connection between the two. However, the new Lufthansa took over staff from the old airline and claims DLH's legacy. For this reason it is controversial in the historical reappraisal to what extent the modern Lufthansa should confess to crimes committed by the old airline.

== History ==
=== 1920s ===
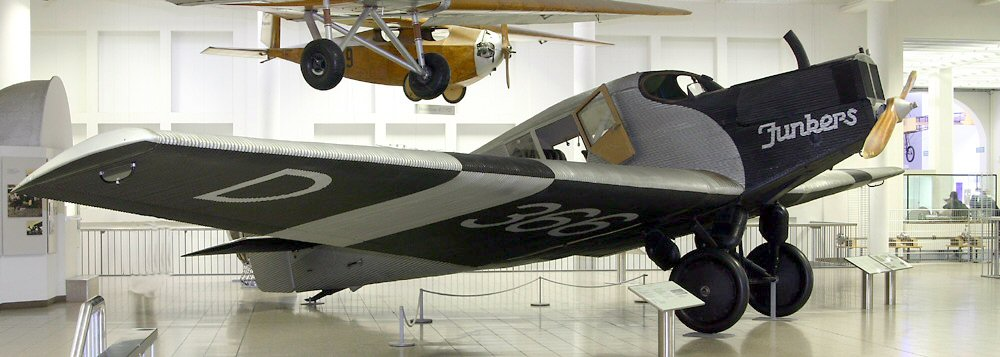
A preserved Junkers F.13, a type which was operated by Luft Hansa in substantial numbers

Deutsche Luft Hansa was founded on 6 January 1926 in Berlin. The name of the company means "German Hansa of the Air". The Hansa or Hanseatic League dominated maritime trade in the Baltic Sea area for hundreds of years, and is well regarded in Germany to this day. The airline was created by the merger of Deutsche Luft-Reederei and Junkers Luftverkehr in 1926. The two companies, Germany's largest airlines at the time, were forced to merge by the German government, while all other airlines were shut down. This reorganization was intended to reduce the amount of financial support the government provided to the airline industry. Like many other countries, Germany subsidized the airlines, which also gave the German government control over them.

The stylised flying crane symbol predates Luft Hansa and had been used by DLR and Deutscher Aero Lloyd. It was created by German graphic designer Otto Firle.

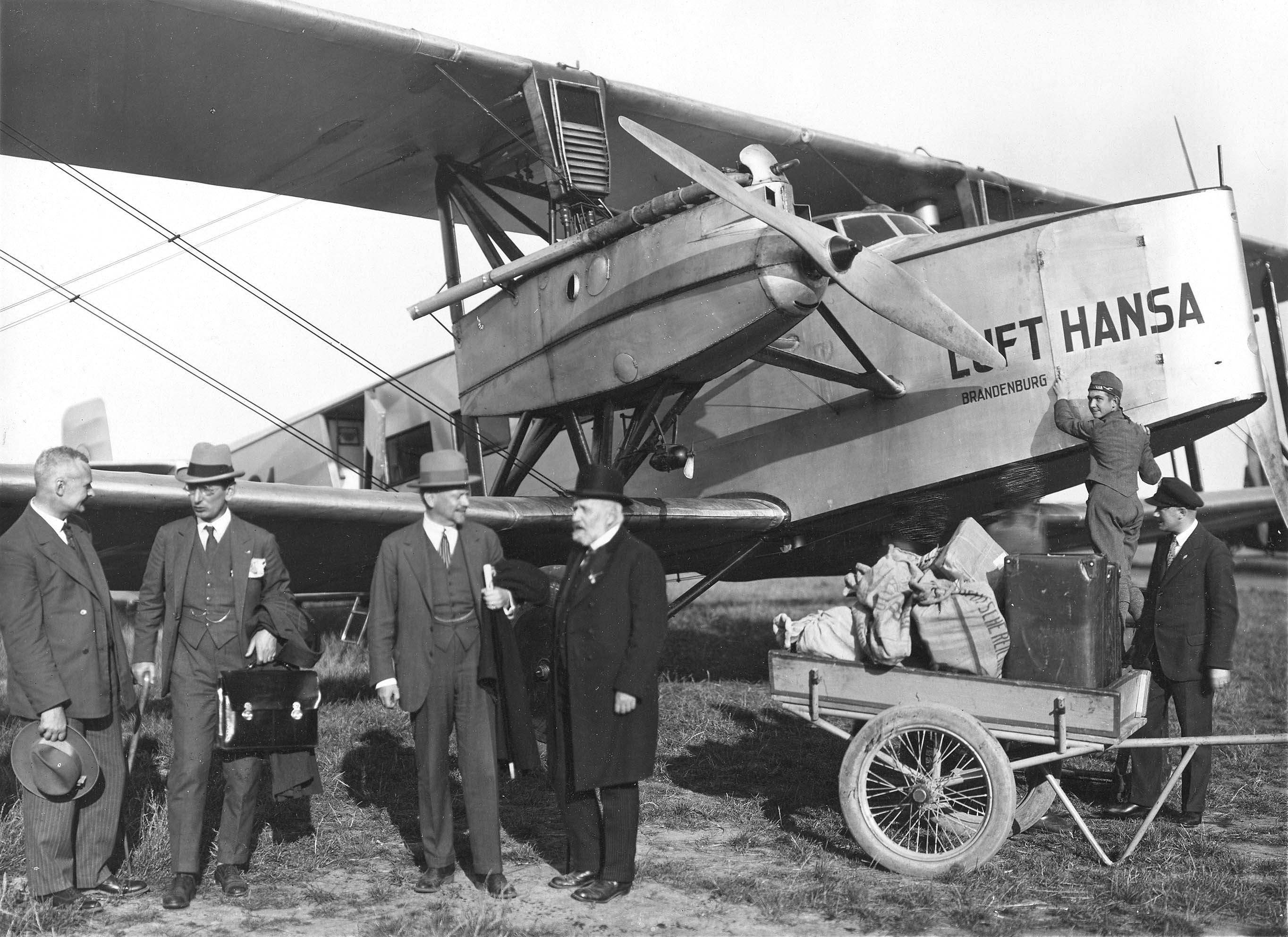
A Deutsche Luft Hansa Albatros L 73, named Brandenburg, at Stettin Airport (1927).

The foundation of the airline coincided with the lifting of most restrictions on commercial air operations imposed on Germany by the Treaty of Versailles, enforced by the Military Inter-Allied Commission of Control. This allowed the route network to be quickly expanded to cover major European cities. The initial fleet consisted of 162 aircraft, nearly all of them outdated World War I types, and the company had 1,527 staff. The most important airfield for DLH was Berlin Tempelhof. From there a Fokker F.II took off on 6 April 1926 for the first scheduled flight to Zürich via Halle, Erfurt and Stuttgart. In the same year, Deutsche Luft Hansa acquired a stake in Deruluft, a joint German-Soviet airline, and launched non-stop flights from Berlin to Moscow, which was then regarded as an exceptionally long distance. Shortly after that, flights to Paris were commenced. Deutsche Luft Hansa was one of the first airlines to operate night flights, the first of which connected Berlin with Königsberg using Junkers G 24 aircraft. This route proved so successful that the night train connection was discontinued some years later. During its first year, the airline operated more than six million flight kilometres, transporting a total of 56,268 passengers and 560 tons of freight and mail.

Over the following years, the domestic network grew to cover all the important cities and towns of Germany. More international routes were added through co-operation agreements. With the newly founded Iberia in Spain its longest scheduled route was 2,100 kilometres from Berlin to Madrid (though with several stopovers). The establishment of Syndicato Condor in Brazil served the airline's interests in South America where there were important German minorities at that time. The first east–west crossing of the North Atlantic Ocean (from Baldonnel Aerodrome in Ireland to Greenly Island, Canada) was made by the Luft Hansa pilot Hermann Köhl, Ehrenfried Günther Freiherr von Hünefeld and the Irish pilot James Fitzmaurice using the Junkers W 33 aircraft Bremen in April 1928. The airline launched scheduled multi-leg flights to Tokyo. A Heinkel HE 12 aircraft was launched (by catapult) off the NDL liner Bremen during her maiden voyage crossing the Atlantic in 1929, shortening the mail delivery time between Europe and North America. Both the Bremen and her sister ship Europa launched mail planes on their scheduled North Atlantic crossings until 1935.

=== 1930s ===
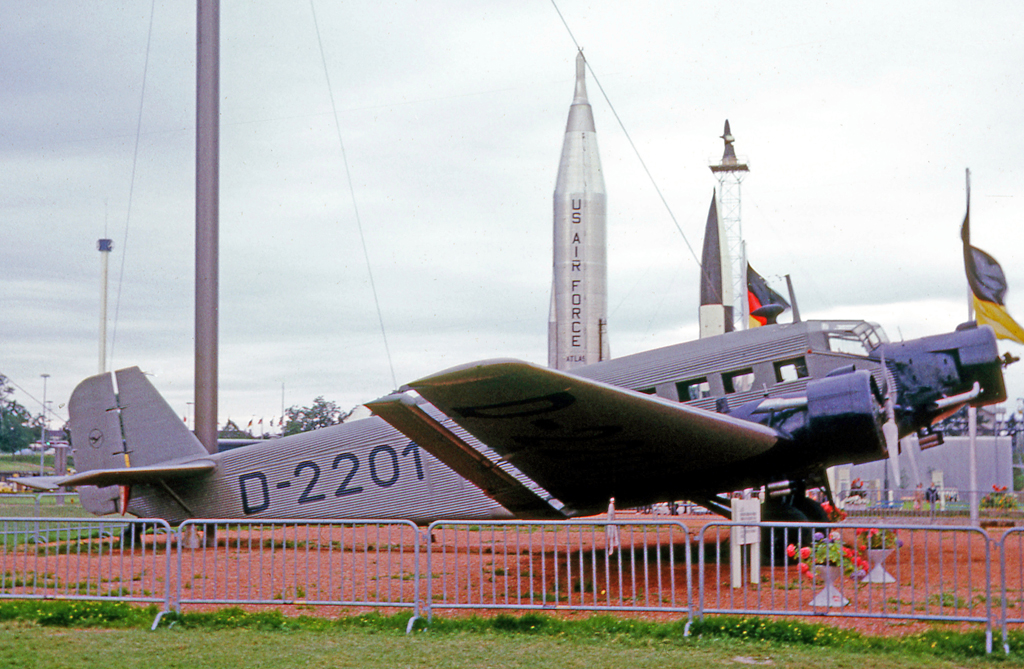
Junkers Ju 52/3mte delivered to DLH in the mid-1930s. Painted as 'D-2201', the first of many examples operated by the airline

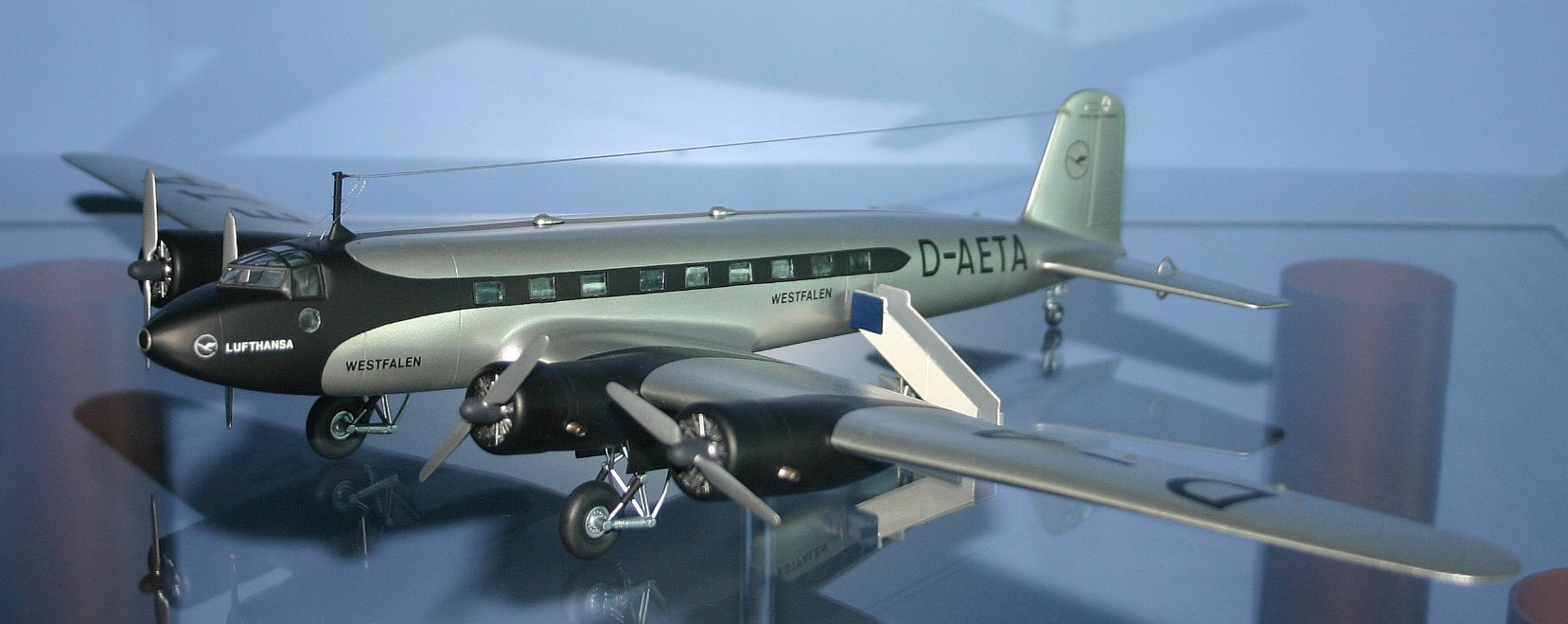
A scale model of a Deutsche Lufthansa Focke-Wulf Fw 200

Even though the early years of the decade saw a difficult financial situation due to the Great Depression, Deutsche Luft Hansa further expanded its international route network in South America, and launched scheduled flights from Germany to the Middle East. Politically, the company leaders were linked to the rising Nazi Party; an aircraft was made available to Adolf Hitler for his campaign for the 1932 presidential election free of any charge. The Nazi party used footage of those flights for their propaganda efforts and gained an advantage in being able to hold events featuring Hitler in different places in far quicker succession than other parties which relied largely on rail transport. Erhard Milch, who had served as head of the airline since 1926, was appointed by Hermann Göring to be head of the Aviation Ministry when Hitler came to power in 1933; Milch had been a member of the Nazi party since 1929, and was later convicted of war crimes. According to a leading scholar of the history of German aviation, from this point, "Lufthansa served as a front organization for armament, which took place secretly until 1935 – it was an air force in disguise." The historian Norman Longmate reported that during its peacetime flights in the 1930s, the airline had secretly photographed the entire British coastline as preparation for a possible invasion.

A key interest of Deutsche Luft Hansa at that time was the reduction of mail delivery times. In 1930, the Eurasia Corporation was established as a joint-venture with the Chinese transport ministry, granting Luft Hansa a monopoly position for mail transport between Germany and China, as well as access to the Chinese market. To this end, the Shanghai-Nanjing-Beijing route was launched in the following year using Junkers W 34 specially deployed there. A record was set in 1930 when the mail route from Vienna to Istanbul (with stopovers in Budapest, Belgrad and Sofia) was completed in only 24 hours. By comparison, the first transatlantic passenger flight by the airline (from Warnemünde to New York City using a Dornier Wal flying boat) took roughly one week.

After several years of testing, a scheduled postal route between Europe and South America was inaugurated in 1934. This was the first regularly scheduled airline service across an ocean in the world. Wal flying boats were used, catapult launched for the trans-Atlantic leg These were replaced by the Dornier Do 18 in 1936 making operations in non-visual conditions possible. The European network saw the introduction of the Junkers G.38 (at that time the largest passenger aircraft in the world) on the Berlin-London route via Amsterdam, as well as the Junkers Ju 52/3m and Heinkel He 70, which allowed for faster air travel. This was promoted by so-called "Blitz Services" (German: Blitzstrecken) between Berlin, Hamburg, Cologne and Frankfurt. In 1935, the first aircraft not manufactured in Germany were introduced into the Luft Hansa fleet: two Boeing 247s and one Douglas DC-2.

The grip on the domestic South American markets was further tightened in 1937, when the Sociedad Ecuatoriana de Transportes Aéreos (SEDTA) and Lufthansa Perú were founded as Luft Hansa co-operations in Ecuador and Peru respectively, operating Junkers W 34 aircraft. The Middle Eastern network was expanded with the launch of the Berlin-Baghdad-Tehran route in the same year. In 1938 the Focke-Wulf Fw 200 long range aircraft was introduced making it possible to fly non-stop between Berlin and New York and from Berlin to Tokyo with only one intermediate stopover. This last year prior to the outbreak of World War II turned out to be the most successful one in the history of the airline, with 19.3 million flight kilometres on the scheduled European routes and a total of 254,713 passengers and 5,288 tons of mail transported.

From 1936, Deutsche Luft Hansa carried out route proving flights to carry mail across the North Atlantic. This service was intended to replace the mail planes launched by catapult from trans-Atlantic steamers. However this never materialized, as German planes were denied the right to carry mail into the country by the United States for political reasons.

On 1 April 1939, Deutsche Luft Hansa launched scheduled transatlantic flights to Natal, Rio Grande do Norte and Santiago de Chile using Fw 200 aircraft, a route which had previously been operated by Syndicato Condor. With Bangkok, Hanoi and Taipei, further Asian destinations were added to the route network.

During the 1930s, Luft Hansa aircraft were deployed on a number of experimental and survey missions, most notably for developing the best airborne crossing of the South Atlantic. During the German Antarctic Expedition (1938–1939) (Antarctica expedition), two Dornier Wal aircraft performed a photographic survey of 350,000 square kilometres, an area which became known as New Swabia.

=== During World War II ===
With the outbreak of WWII on 1 September 1939, all civilian flight operations of Luft Hansa came to an end, and the aircraft fleet came under command of the Luftwaffe, along with most staff. The company focused on aircraft maintenance and repair. There were still scheduled passenger flights within Germany and to occupied or neutral countries, but bookings were restricted and served the demands of warfare. During the later years of the war, most passenger aircraft were converted to military freighters.

The Luft Hansa co-operations in foreign countries were gradually dismantled: Deruluft ceased to exist in March 1940, and by November of that year, the Eurasia Corporation had to be shut down following an intervention by the Chinese government. Syndicato Condor was nationalised and renamed Cruzeiro do Sul in 1943, in an attempt to erase its German roots.

The last scheduled flight of Deutsche Luft Hansa – from Berlin to Munich – took place on 21 April 1945, but the aircraft crashed shortly before the planned arrival, killing all 21 aboard. Another (non-scheduled) flight was performed the next day, from Berlin to Warnemünde, which marked the end of flight operations. Following the surrender of Germany and the ensuing Allied occupation of Germany, all aircraft in the country were seized and Deutsche Luft Hansa was dissolved. The remaining assets were liquidated on 1 January 1951.

==== Use of forced labor ====
During World War II, Deutsche Luft Hansa employed more than 10,000 forced laborers, including many children, from occupied countries; forced Jewish labor was particularly used from 1940 to 1942. Forced laborers were used to install and maintain radar systems and to assemble, repair, and maintain aircraft, including military aircraft. Forced laborers were lodged in barracks run by Luft Hansa on the Tempelhof site and elsewhere in Berlin. They were surrounded by barbed wire and guarded by authorities with machine guns; sanitation in these camps was poor, as was the level of medical care and nutrition. In 2012, a team of archaeologists excavated the site of the camp run by Luft Hansa on Tempelhof airport.

=== Legacy ===
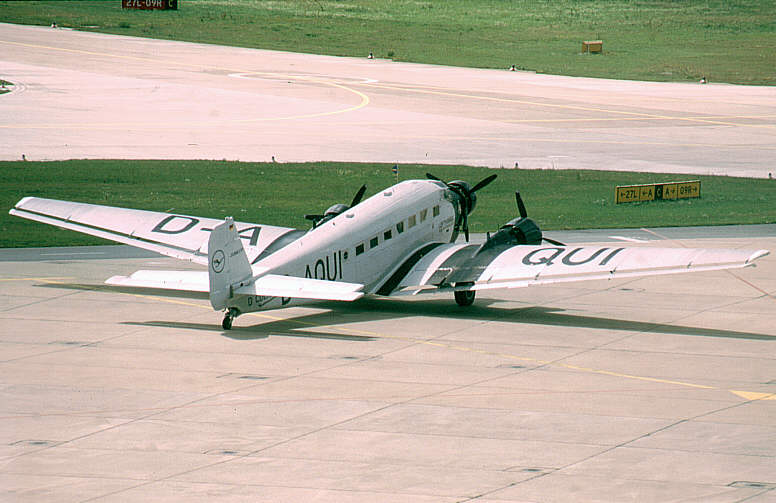
A Junkers Ju 52 preserved by Lufthansa in the colours of Deutsche Luft Hansa (2000)

Lufthansa, today's German flag carrier, acquired the name and logo of the 1926–1945 airline upon its foundation in 1953 and claims DLH's history as its own. However, there is no legal link between the two companies. Between 1955 and 1963, the newly founded East German national airline operated under the same name but, having lost a lawsuit with the West German company, it was liquidated and replaced by Interflug.

== Route network ==
=== European passenger flights ===
From 1926 until the outbreak of World War II in 1939, Deutsche Luft Hansa built up an extensive network centred on its base at Berlin Tempelhof Airport covering many German cities and towns, as well as the major European cities. There were early interline agreements which granted Luft Hansa passengers access to the flight network of leading European airlines of that time and vice versa. The agreements were with air lines including Aerotransport, Ad Astra Aero, Adria Aerolloyd, Aero Oy, Air Union, Balair, CIDNA, CSA, DDL, Imperial Airways, KLM, Lignes Aeriennes Latécoère, LOT, ÖLAG, Malert, SABENA, SANA, SGTA, and Ukrpovitroshliakh, as well as Syndicato Condor from Brazil and SCADTA from Colombia.

During that period, the following European destinations saw scheduled passenger flights:

Austria

- Graz – Thalerhof Airport
- Innsbruck – Reichenau Airport
- Klagenfurt – Annabichl Airport
- Salzburg – Maxglan Airport
- Vienna – Aspern Airport

Belgium

- Brussels (Haren) – Haren Airport

Bulgaria

- Sofia – Bozhurishte Airport

Czechoslovakia

- Bratislava – Vajnory Airport
- Karlsbad – Espenthor Airport
- Marienbad – Sklare Airport
- Piešťany
- Prague – Kbely Airport

Denmark

- Copenhagen – Kastrup Airport

Estonia

- Tallinn – Ülemiste Airport

Finland

- Helsinki – Malmi Airport

France

- Marseille – Mariagnane Airport
- Paris – Le Bourget Airport
- Toulouse

Free City of Danzig

- Danzig – Langfuhr Airport

Germany

- Aachen
- Baden-Baden – Baden-Oos Airport
- Borkum
- Berlin – Berlin Tempelhof Airport (main hub)
- Braunschweig
- Bremen – Neuenland Airport
- Bremerhaven
- Breslau – Gandau Airport
- Chemnitz
- Cologne – Butzweilerhof Airport (secondary hub)
- Cottbus
- Darmstadt
- Dessau
- Dortmund – Brackel Airport
- Dresden – Klotzsche Airport
- Düsseldorf – Düsseldorf Airport
- Erfurt
- Essen/Mülheim – Mülheim Airport
- Flensburg – Schäferhaus Airport
- Frankfurt – Rhein-Main Airport (secondary hub)
- Freiburg
- Friedrichshafen – Löwental Airport
- Gera
- Gleiwitz
- Görlitz
- Goslar
- Halle/Leipzig – Schkeuditz Airport (secondary hub)
- Hamburg – Hamburg-Fuhlsbüttel Airport (secondary hub)
- Hanover – Vahrenwalder Heide Airport
- Hiddensee
- Hirschberg – Hartau Airport
- Karlsruhe
- Kiel – Holtenau Airport
- Krefeld
- Königsberg – Devau Airport
- Konstanz
- Krefeld
- Langeoog
- Lübeck/Travemünde
- Magdeburg
- Mannheim – Neuostheim Airport
- Munich – Oberwiesenfeld Airport (secondary hub)
- Norderney
- Nuremberg/Fürth – Fürth Airport
- Osnabrück/Münster
- Plauen – Hof-Plauen Airport
- Saarbrücken – St. Arnual Airport
- Stettin – Am Dammschen See Airport
- Stolp
- Stralsund
- Stuttgart – Böblingen Airport
- Swinemünde
- Tilsit
- Wangerooge
- Wernigerode
- Westerland – Westerland Airport
- Wyk
- Zwickau

Greece

- Athens – Dekelea Airport
- Rhodes
- Thessaloniki – Sedes Airport

Hungary

- Budapest – Budaörs Airport

Italy

- Bolzano
- Milan – Taliedo Airport
- Rome – Littorio Airport
- Trento – Gardolo Airport
- Venice – San Nicolò Airport

Latvia

- Riga – Spilve Airport

Lithuania

- Kaunas – Kaunas Airport
- Klaipėda / Memel – Rumpiškės airfield (by 1927)

The Netherlands

- Amsterdam – Schiphol Airport
- Rotterdam – Waalhaven Airport

Norway

- Oslo – Gressholmen Airport

Poland

- Kraków- Rakowice-Czyżyny Airport
- Lwów
- Poznań – Lawica Airport
- Warsaw – Okecie Airport

Portugal

- Lisbon

Romania

- Bukarest – Băneasa Airport

Soviet Union

- Bigosovo
- Leningrad
- Moscow – Khodynka Aerodrome
- Velikiye Luki

Spain

- Burgos
- Barcelona
- Madrid
- Salamanca

Sweden

- Gothenburg – Torslanda Airport
- Malmö – Bulltofta Airport
- Stockholm – Bromma Airport

Switzerland

- Basel – Birsfelden Airport
- Bern – Belpmoos Airport
- Geneva – Cointrin Airport
- Zürich – Dübendorf Airport

Turkey

- Istanbul

United Kingdom

- London – Croydon Airport

Yugoslavia

- Belgrade – Zemun Airport
- Skopje

=== Middle East and Central/South Asia passenger flights ===
Afghanistan

- Herat
- Kabul

Iran

- Tehran – Doshan Tappeh

Iraq

- Baghdad – Baghdad-West Airport

Syria

- Damascus

=== During World War II ===
Due to the war and the de facto end of commercial air transport in Germany, Luft Hansa operated scheduled passenger flights only on some domestic trunk routes and international services on a limited number of routes to occupied or Axis-affiliated countries. These routes deteriorated during the war as Germany came closer to defeat.

As of 1940/41, the following destinations were served. At that time, interline agreements were in force with Iberia, Aeroflot, Malert, LARES (Romania), Aero Oy (Finland), DDL (occupied Denmark), ABA (Sweden), and CSA (occupied Czechoslovakia).

Bulgaria

- Sofia – Bozhurishte Airport

Denmark

- Copenhagen – Kastrup Airport

German Reich

- Berlin – Tempelhof Airport (hub)
- Breslau – Gandau Airport
- Danzig – Langfuhr Airport
- Königsberg – Devau Airport
- Munich – Riem Airport
- Prague – Rusin Airport
- Stuttgart – Echterdingen Airport
- Vienna – Aspern Airport

Greece

- Athens – Dekelea Airport
- Thessaloniki – Sedes Airport

Hungary

- Budapest – Budaörs Airport

Italy

- Rome – Littorio Airport
- Venice – San Nicolò Airport

Norway

- Oslo – Fornebu Airport

Romania

- Arad – Arad Airport
- Bukarest – Băneasa Airport

Portugal

- Lisbon – Granja do Marques Airport

Soviet Union

- Belostok – Belostok Airport
- Minsk – Minsk Airport
- Moscow – Khodynka Aerodrome

Spain

- Barcelona – Muntadas Airport
- Madrid – Barajas Airport

Sweden

- Stockholm – Bromma Airport

Switzerland

- Zürich – Dübendorf Airport

Turkey

- Istanbul – Yeşilköy Airport

Yugoslavia

- Belgrade – Zemun Airport

Additionally, there were scheduled sea plane flights along the Norwegian coast (from Trondheim to Kirkenes), which was then part of the Atlantic Wall.

== Fleet ==
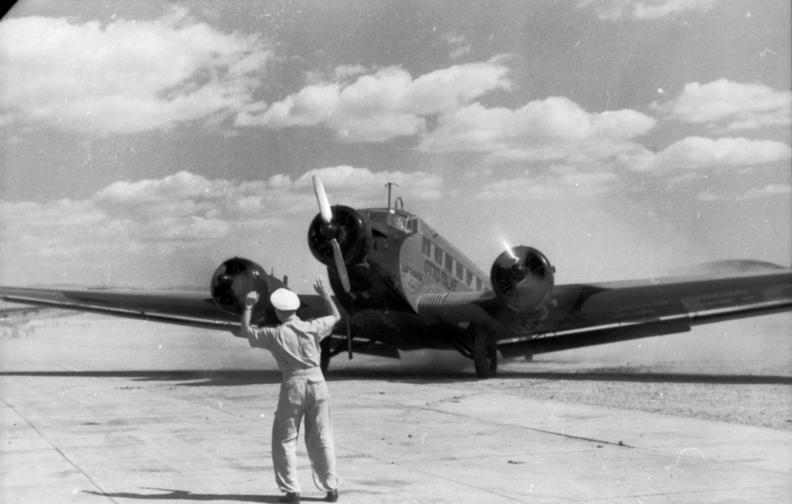
The Deutsche Luft Hansa Ju 52 Otto Falke with running engines at Belgrade-Dojno polje Airport, Kingdom of Yugoslavia. (1941)

Over the years of its existence, Deutsche Luft Hansa operated the following aircraft types:

Deutsche Luft Hansa fleet history
Aircraft	Introduced	Retired	Notes
Arado V I	1929	1929	1 only, cargo, lost in crash
BFW M.20	1929	1943	14
Blohm & Voss Ha 139	1937	1939	cargo floatplane
Blohm & Voss Ha 142	1939	1940	cargo
Boeing 247	1935		
Dornier Do 18	1937	1939	cargo flying boat
Dornier Do R	1928	1932	flying boat
Dornier Komet III	1926	1933	
Dornier Do J	1926	1940	cargo flying boat
Douglas DC-2	1935		
Douglas DC-3	1940	1944	
Focke-Wulf A 17	1927		
Focke-Wulf A 32	1934		2 aircraft from NOBA
Focke-Wulf A 33	1937	1938	1 only
Focke-Wulf A 38	1931	1934	4 aircraft
Focke-Wulf Fw 58	1938	1943	5 aircraft
Focke-Wulf Fw 200	1938	1945	
Fokker-Grulich F.II; Fokker-Grulich F.III	1926	1935	
Heinkel HE 12	1929	1931	mail plane, 1 only, written off after crash
Heinkel He 58	1930	1932	mail plane, 1 only
Heinkel He 70	1934	1937	passenger, mail
Heinkel He 111	1936	1940	passenger
Heinkel He 116	1938		mail plane
Junkers F 13	1926	1938	
Junkers G 24	1926	1938	
Junkers G 31	1928	1935	8 aircraft
Junkers G.38	1930	1939	2 only, one written off after crash in 1936.
Junkers Ju 46	1933	1939	mail plane
Junkers Ju 52	1935	1945	
Junkers Ju 86	1936	1945	5 aircraft
Junkers Ju 90	1938	1940	
Junkers Ju 160	1935	1941	21 aircraft
Junkers Ju 290	1943	1945	3 examples
Junkers W 33; Junkers W 34	1929; 1926	1929	mail plane
Rohrbach Ro VIII	1927	1936	
Rumpler C.I	1926		
Udet U-11	1929	1929	1 only, lost in crash

== Bibliography ==
- Cooksley, Peter (September–October 1996). "Celestial Coaches: Dornier's Record Breaking Komet and Merkur". Air Enthusiast (65): 20–24. ISSN 0143-5450.
- Joachim Wachtel, Günter Ott: Im Zeichen des Kranichs. Die Geschichte der Lufthansa von den Anfängen bis 1945. Piper, München 2016, ISBN 978-3-492-05788-2.
- Lutz Budraß: Adler und Kranich. Die Lufthansa und ihre Geschichte 1926-1955. Blessing, München 2016, ISBN 978-3-89667-481-4.
