= Walther Wever (general) =

Luftwaffe Chief of Staff

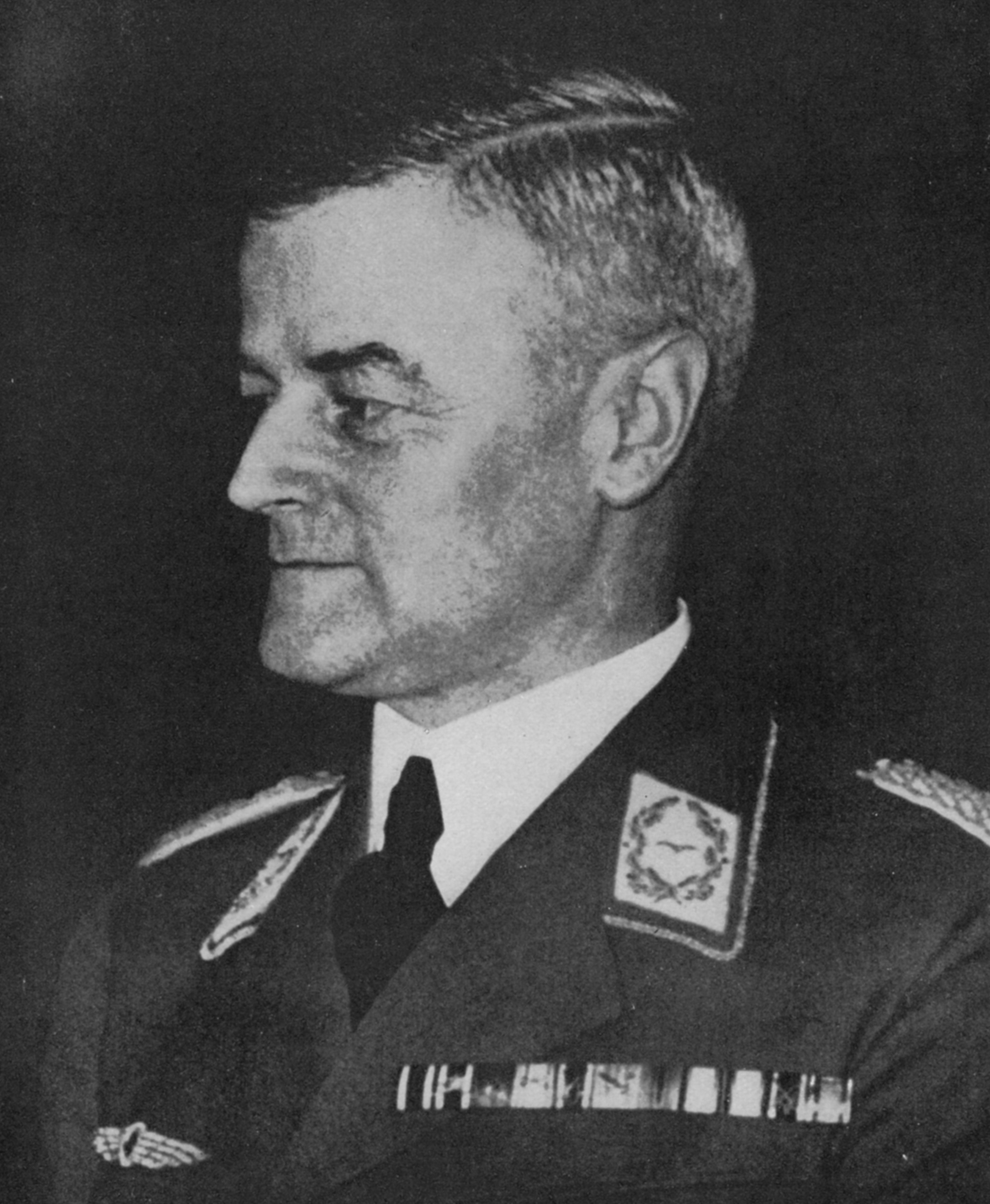
- Born: 11 November 1887; Wilhelmsort, Bromberg district
- Died: 3 June 1936 (aged 48); Dresden-Klotzsche
- Relatives: Walther Wever (son)
- Military career
- Allegiance: German Empire; Weimar Republic; Nazi Germany
- Branch: Luftwaffe
- Rank: Generalleutnant
- Commands: Chief of the Luftwaffe General Staff
- Conflicts: World War I

Walther Wever (11 November 1887 – 3 June 1936) was a pre-World War II Luftwaffe Commander. He was an early proponent of the theory of strategic bombing as a means to wage war, while supporting the theories of Giulio Douhet. He died in an air crash in 1936.

== Early life ==
Walther Wever was born on 11 November 1887 in Wilhelmsort in the county of Bromberg (now in Poland, then in East Prussia). He was the son of Arnold Wever, the one-time director of a Berlin bank and the grandson of the Prussian Prosecutor-General Dr. Carl George Wever. After his final secondary examinations, he settled in Schweidnitz where he trained as an officer.

Wever saw action as an aerial observer in World War I and served as a staff officer for the OHL (Oberste Heeresleitung, Army High Command).

== Luftwaffe ==
Wever became the Commander of the Reichsluftfahrtministerium on 1 September 1933. On 1 March 1935, he became Chief of Staff of the Luftwaffe shortly after its creation on 26 February 1935, a post he held until his death. Wever was a supporter of the Strategic bomber and recognised its importance as early as 1934. He supported the aviation companies such as Junkers and Dornier, in their respective projects to produce the Ju 89 and Dornier Do 19 competitors for the Ural Bomber production contract competition. Wever outlined five key points to air strategy:

1. To destroy the enemy air force by bombing its bases and aircraft factories and defeating enemy air forces attacking German targets.
2. To prevent the movement of large enemy ground forces to the decisive areas by destroying railways and roads, particularly bridges and tunnels, which are indispensable for the movement and supply of forces
3. To support the operations of the army formations, independent of railways, i.e, armored forces and motorised forces, by impeding the enemy advance and participating directly in ground operations.
4. To support naval operations by attacking naval bases, protecting Germany's naval bases and participating directly in naval battles
5. To paralyze the enemy armed forces by stopping production in the armaments factories.

However, after his death, other people, like Ernst Udet and Hans Jeschonnek, favored smaller aircraft as they did not use as much material and manpower. They were proponents of the dive-bomber (Junkers Ju 87) and the doctrine of close support and destruction of the opposing air forces on the 'battle-ground' rather than through attacking enemy industry. As a result, high-speed medium-bombers such as the Heinkel He 111, Dornier Do 17, and Junkers Ju 88 were developed, with much initial success. While some large strategic bomber programs were initiated, most notable the Ural Bomber project, which morphed into the He 177 Program, without a proponent of strategic bombing in the upper echelons of the Luftwaffe, the programs saw little progress and would ultimately be developed too late into the war to have any meaningful effect.

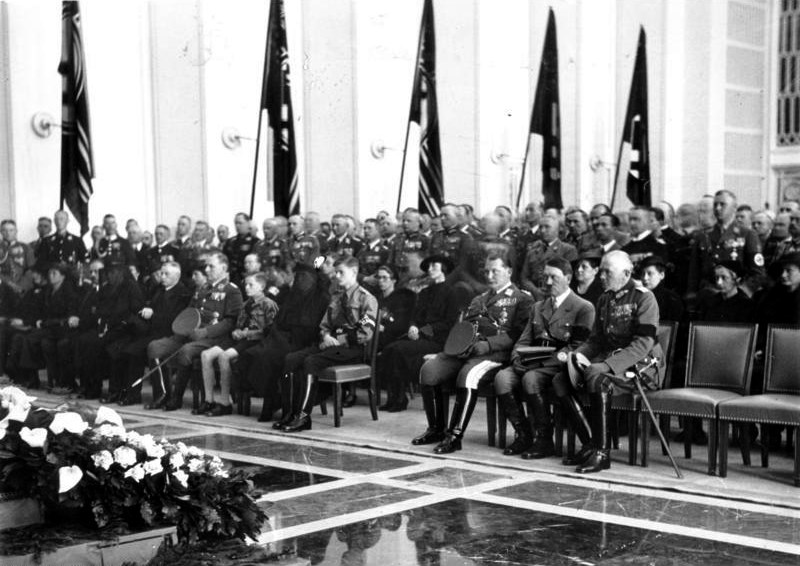
Walther Wever funeral

On 3 June 1936, Wever flew from Berlin to Dresden to give a lecture at the Luftkriegsschule Klotzsche to a gathering of Luftwaffe cadets. He was intending to fly straight back to Berlin for the funeral of World War I German hero Karl Litzmann. On his return journey the Heinkel He 70 'Blitz' that he was flying had not been properly examined during preflight checks in his hurry, and he had not removed the aileron gust locks. He had been warned the previous day that he was not thoroughly familiar with the aircraft. Wever was barely airborne when the wing dipped, and the Heinkel stalled and went into a horizontal cartwheel (akin to a ground loop, but at low altitude). It crashed and exploded, killing Wever and his flight engineer. The same day, the RLM issued the Bomber A heavy bomber specification and design competition for what would become the Luftwaffe's only wartime heavy bomber in production and frontline service, the Heinkel He 177.

After Wever's death a Luftwaffe bomber wing, Kampfgeschwader 4 General Wever was named after him, which fittingly enough in the later war years would be equipped with the only aircraft resulting from the design competition which started on the day of General Wever's death, the Heinkel He 177. His son, also named Walther Wever, was a fighter pilot who was killed in action in April 1945.

Following the death of Generalleutnant Walther Wever, Albert Kesselring became Chief of Staff of the Luftwaffe on 3 June 1936.

== Notes and citations ==
Military offices
Preceded by none	Chief of the Luftwaffe General Staff; 1 March 1935 – 3 June 1936	Succeeded by Generalleutnant Albert Kesselring
