= Schönteichen =

- Municipality
- Coat of arms
- Interactive map of Schönteichen
- Location within Germany Location within Saxony
- Coordinates: 51°18′N 14°3′E
- Country: Germany
- State: Saxony
- District: Bautzen
- Disbanded: 2019
- Subdivisions: 9

Area
  - Total: 45.05 km^{2} (17.39 sq mi)
- Elevation: 222 m (728 ft)

Population (2017-12-31)
  - Total: 2,095
  - Density: 46.50/km^{2} (120.4/sq mi)
- Time zone: UTC+01:00 (CET)
  - Summer (DST): UTC+02:00 (CEST)
- Postal codes: 01920
- Dialling codes: 03578
- Vehicle registration: BZ, BIW, HY, KM
- Website: www.schoenteichen.de

Schönteichen (German pronunciation: [ˈʃøːnˌtaɪçn̩]; Upper Sorbian: Šěnčicy) is a former municipality in the district of Bautzen, in Saxony, Germany. Schönteichen was created in 1994 by the merger of nine formerly independent municipalities. It was merged into the town Kamenz in January 2019. Schönteichen is a small community between the Upper Lusatian heath and the pond area of the Westlausitzer hills and mountains. With its nine districts - Biehla, Brauna, Cunnersdorf, Hausdorf, Liebenau, Petershain, Rohrbach, Schönbach and Schwosdorf - it covers an area of almost 45 km², surrounded by larger forest areas and nestled in a charming pond landscape. The municipality has its name from the countless ponds in the towns, which decisively shape the landscape.
