= Glossary of German military terms =

This is a list of words, terms, concepts, and slogans that have been or are used by the German military. Ranks and translations of nicknames for vehicles are included. Also included are some general terms from the German language found frequently in military jargon. Some terms are from the general German cultural background, others are given to show a change that was made before or after the Nazi era. Some factories that were the primary producers of military equipment, especially tanks, are also given.

== Glossary ==
=== A ===
- A-Stand – forward defensive gunner's position on aircraft.
- abgeschossen – shot down; destroyed by means of firing.
- Abschnitt – sector, district.
- Ablösungsdivision – relief division (1917), later renamed Eingreif division (intervention division).
- Abteilung (Abt.) – a battalion-sized unit of armor, artillery or cavalry; in other contexts a detachment or section.
  - Abteilungsarzt – battalion physician
  - Abteilungschef – battalion commander in artillery and cavalry formations
  - Abteilungsführer – substitute battalion commander in artillery and cavalry formations
  - Abteilungsveterinär – battalion veterinarian
- Abwehr – "defense"; as a shortening of Spionage Abwehr (spy defense) the term referred to the counter-espionage service (German Secret Service) of the German High Command, headed by Admiral Canaris. Also an element in such compounds as Fliegerabwehr-Kanone "anti-aircraft gun."
- Abzeichen – insignia; badge of rank, appointment or distinction.
- Adlerangriff – "Eagle Attack"; term for projected "decisive attack" by the Luftwaffe on RAF Fighter Command under the direction of Hermann Göring, instituted to gain control of the skies from the Royal Air Force and soften Britain for the impending invasion forces planned in Operation Seelöwe (Sea Lion). These attacks ultimately failed and the air campaign is now known in the anglophone world as the Battle of Britain.
- Afrika Korps – the German force commanded by Erwin Rommel, known as the "Wüstenfuchs" (en: Desert Fox), which fought in Hitler's North African campaigns between 1941 and 1943. Allied efforts to defeat Rommel were high and many historians believe that had Rommel convinced Hitler to provide him with three additional divisions of tanks, he very well could have gained command of the Suez Canal in early 1942 and cut off the vast supplies being sent from America to the Soviet Union via the Persian Gulf. In the end, the Afrika Korps was defeated by combined offensives by british and american forces.
- Aggregat 4 (A4) – original name of the German V2 rocket.
- AGRU-Front – Technische Ausbildungsgruppe für Front U-Boote – technical training group for front-line U-boats.
- AK – Alle Kraft (voraus), naval command for flank speed. Also "Äusserste Kraft!"
- Aal – "eel"; slang for torpedo.
- "Alarm!" – U-boat order to activate the alarm and begin a crash dive. Also "Fire!", "Air raid!" for Luftwaffe fighter pilots, etc.
- Alarmtauchen – crash dive.
- "Alle Maschinen stop!" – naval command: "Stop all engines".
- "Alle Mann von Bord!" – naval command; "All hands, abandon ship!"
- Allgemeine SS – "General SS", general main body of the Schutzstaffel made up of the full-time administrative, security, intelligence and police branches of the SS as well as the broader part-time membership that turned out for parades, rallies and "street actions" such as Kristallnacht; also comprised reserve and honorary members.
- Alte Hasen – "Old hares"; slang for military veterans who survived front-line hardships.
- Amerikabomber – A spring 1942 aviation contract competition for a Luftwaffe trans-oceanic range strategic bomber, only resulting in a few completed prototype aircraft from two firms, and many advanced designs that mostly remained on paper.
- Ami – German slang for an American soldier.
- Anton – German spelling alphabet for A equivalent to Alpha (e.g. Case Anton)
- Ärmelband – cuff title. Worn on the left sleeve, the title contains the name of the wearer's unit or a campaign they are part of. Cuff titles are still used in the German Army and Luftwaffe.
- Amt – office, main office branch.
- Amt Mil – German Army intelligence organization that succeeded the Abwehr.
- Amtsgruppe Allgemeine Wehrmachtsangelegenheiten (Office of General Military Affairs) – Department of the OKW responsible for general military affairs. in 1938–39, this office was called the Wehrwirtschaftsstab (Military Economics Staff).
- Angriff – attack.
- Angriffsmuster – attack pattern.
- Angriffsziel – attack objective.
- Ansatz (attack) – First World War military term, used in National Socialist vocabulary in the same ways as the word Einsatz, though less frequently; one referred to bringing a piece of equipment, troops or a weapon "zum Ansatz" (into attack, or play).
- Anschluss – unification of Austria and Germany
- Armee – a field army, typically a numbered army. During WW1 the armies Prussia, Bavaria and Württemberg were called Armeen. Cf. 'Heer'.
- Armeeabteilung – command between a corps and an army, an enlarged corps headquarters.
- Armeekorps – infantry corps.
- Armee-Nachrichten-Führer – army signals officer, served on the staff HQ of an army.
- Armeeoberkommando – field army command.
- Armee-Pionier-Führer – senior field army engineer officer, served on the staff HQ of an army.
- Armee-Sanitäts-Abteilung – field army medical battalion.
- Artillerie (Art.) – artillery.
- Atomwaffe – nuclear weapon.
- Atomkrieg – nuclear war.
- Aufbau Ost (Buildup East) – code name for the preparatory measures taken amid great secrecy for the attack on the Soviet Union, now known as Operation Barbarossa.
- aufgelöst – "dissolved"; disbanded, written off the order of battle.
- Aufklärung – reconnaissance.
- Aufklärungs-Abteilung – reconnaissance unit or battalion, also used to designate certain battalion-sized units.
- Aufklärungsgruppe (Aufkl.Gr., later AGr) – "Reconnaissance group", an aerial recon group of the Luftwaffe, e.g. Aufklärungsgruppe 11.
- "Auftauchen!" – "surface the boat".
- Auftragstaktik – mission-type tactics, the central component of German warfare since the 19th century
- Aus der Traum – "It's over!", "It's finished!", literally, "The dream is over"; a common German phrase for dashed hopes and a slogan painted by German soldiers near the end of the war expressing the inevitability of their situation.
- Ausführung (Ausf.) – version, model, variant, batch, for non-aviation related vehicles and ordnance.
- Ausführung!/Ausführen! – command to execute a given order
- ausgefallen – statement that equipment is down, has failed, is out of action.
- Ausrüstung – equipment
- Ausschreitungen – bloody atrocities (see Greuelerzählungen).
- Auszeichnung – medal, accolade, distinction.
- außer Dienst (a.D.) – [literally: "out of service"] a retired officer. Example: Oberleutnant a. D. Johann Schmidt.

=== B ===
- B-Stand – Dorsal (top of fuselage) defensive gunner's position on aircraft.
- Backbord (Bb) – Port side of a ship.
- Balkenkreuz – equal-armed black cross flanked in white, the emblem used on German Empire and Third Reich military aircraft and vehicles from March/April 1918 until V-E Day
- Banditen – bandits, partisans in occupied territories in World War II; bewaffnete Banden – armed gangs; Soldaten in Zivilkleidung – soldiers in civilian dress; (see Franktireure).
- Bandengebiet – territory controlled by partisan squads in occupied territories during World War II.
- Barbarossa (Red Beard) – code name for the massive Nazi attack against the Soviet Union (Operation Barbarossa) which began during June 1941 and failed miserably in the end despite early success. Operation Barbarossa is the English rendering of the German "Unternehmen Barbarossa." Barbarossa or `Redbeard' (Frederick I) lived from 1123 AD to 1190 and was both King of Germany and Holy Roman emperor from 1152–90. He made a sustained attempt to subdue Italy and the papacy, but was eventually defeated at the battle of Legnano in 1176. He was drowned in Asia Minor while on his way to the Third Crusade. Nonetheless, German superstition holds to this day and certainly was evoked by Hitler at the time, that Barbarossa rests in a mountain in Germany awaiting the moment to emerge and save Germany from certain defeat and to establish German ascendancy.
- Bataillon (Btl.) – battalion
  - Bataillonsadjutant – battalion adjutant
  - Bataillonsarzt – battalion medical officer
  - Bataillonsführer – acting battalion commander
  - Bataillonskommandeur – battalion commander
  - Bataillonsveterinär – battalion veterinary officer
- Batterie (Bttr.) – battery, artillery piece; also used for an electrical battery. sometimes also called Akkumulator, abbreviated as Akku.
  - Batteriechef – battery commander
  - Batterieführer – acting battery commander
  - Batterieoffizier – gun position officer
- Baubelehrung – vessel familiarization; when a boat or ship crew studied the construction of a new vessel; see "KLA."
- Baubeschreibung – general arrangement drawing sheet, giving basic dimensions and other measurement & physical parameters (materials, dihedral angles, etc.), of either German front line; or Beute/"captured" Allied aircraft, in World War I. The same term was used in the Third Reich era for more comprehensive, multi-page technical document works for factory proposals concerning combat aircraft designs to the RLM and Luftwaffe.
- Baupionier – army construction engineer.
- B-Dienst – Beobachtungsdienst, literally, "observation service"; German Navy cryptanalytical department.
- BDM Bund Deutscher Mädel – League of German Girls, the girls' segment of the Hitler Youth.
- B. d. U. – Befehlshaber der U-Boote – Commander-in-Chief of the U-boats (Admiral Karl Dönitz); see FdU.
- Befehl (pl. Befehle) – order, command. "Zu Befehl!" was an affirmative phrase on par with "Jawohl".
- Befehlshaber – commander-in-chief; lit. "one who has (the power to issue) commands." Sometimes also used to refer to the headquarters of a C-in-C as an alternative to Hauptquartier.
- Benzin – gasoline, petrol.
- Benzintank – fuel tank.
- Beobachter – artillery or air observer
- Beobachtungsoffizier – Artillery officer
- Beobachtungswagen – observation or reconnaissance vehicle.
- Bereitschaft – readiness. In the German civil defense and Allgemeine SS also a company size unit.
- Bergepanzer – armoured recovery vehicle.
- Berlin radar – most advanced airborne intercept radar of the WW II Luftwaffe in 1944–45, based on captured cavity magnetron technology, operated on SHF-band 3.3 GHz frequency
- Beschlagschmied – farrier; see Hufbeschlagschmied.
- Betriebstoff – fuel.
- Beutepanzer – captured tank or armoured vehicle.
- Beutewaffen – captured enemy weapons and munitions. Germany catalogued them by a code number, followed by a single code letter to indicate the nation that produced and used it.
- Bewährungseinheit – disciplinary unit.
- BK – Bordkanone. heavy-calibre (usually over 30 mm) cannon for offensive use on aircraft.
- Blasen – U-boat order; "Blow the tanks!"
- Blechkoller – "tin fright"; in U-boats, a form of nervous tension that could be caused by depth charge attacks and resulted in violence or hysteria.
- Blechkrawatte – "tin necktie," slang for the Knight's Cross
- Blitzkrieg – "lightning war"; not a widely used German military term, this word became popular in the Allied press and initially referred to fast-moving battle tactics developed principally by German military theorists, most notably Erwin Rommel, Heinz Guderian, and Erich von Manstein, using massed tanks and ground-attack bombers to speedily penetrate enemy lines at points and move to their rear, causing confusion and panic among enemy forces.
- Blaukreuz – chemical warfare agent consisting of arsenic compounds, respiratory poison
- Bola – contraction of Bodenlafette, a lightly armoured casemate-style of bulged ventral defensive gunner's position, using only flexible (unturreted) weapon mounts, a common fitment on German bomber aircraft designs, usually under the nose.
- Bomber B – the abortive World War II-era aviation contract competition meant to replace all previous Luftwaffe medium bombers with a single design, meant to be used for all but the longest-range missions, and function as a combination of medium and heavy bomber, and meant to be powered by a pair of high-output aviation piston engines such as the Junkers Jumo 222.
- Brotbeutel – haversack
- Brücke – bridge. Can mean either the road structure or a ship's command center, also the supporting framework that existed below the bird-like monoplane wings of the earlier examples of the Etrich Taube before World War I.
- Brückenleger – bridgelayer.
- Brummbär – "grumbling bear"; a children's word for "bear" in German. It was the nickname for a heavy mobile artillery piece.
- Bundes – federal.
- Bundeswehr – "Federal Defense Force", name adopted for the West German armed forces after the fall of the Third Reich. (Between 1945 and 1955 there was no German army.) The Bundeswehr consists of the Heer (Army), Luftwaffe (Air Force) and Marine (Navy), as well as (since the late 1990s) the Streitkräftebasis (Joint Service Support Command) and Zentraler Sanitätsdienst (Central Medical Service).
- Bürger – citizen.
- Bürgerkrieg – civil war.

=== C ===
- C-Stand – ventral (underside of fuselage) defensive gunner's position on aircraft.
- Chef – commander of a unit or sub-unit, e.g. Regimentschef. A substitute in case of absence would be referred to as Regimentsführer etc.
- Chef des Generalstabes – Chief of the General Staff.
- Condor Legion – volunteer forces of the Wehrmacht and Luftwaffe (6000 or more strong) sent by Hitler to assist Franco during the Spanish Civil War (1936) on the stipulations that it remained exclusively under German command. The aerial branch of the Condor Legion gained notoriety for their comprehensive bombing of the Spanish rebel lines and the surrounding civilian centers, most notably the Spanish city of Guernica on 27 April 1937. After the successful utilization of the Condor Legion, a homecoming parade was held in Berlin on 6 June 1939 to honor the 300 Germans who died fighting in the campaign.

=== D ===
- der Landwehr (d. L.) – "of the Landwehr". A non-commissioned or commissioned officer in the Landwehr. Example: Oberleutnant d. L. Johann Schmidt.
- der Reserve (d. R.) – "of the Reserve". A non-commissioned or commissioned officer in the Army Reserve. Example: Oberleutnant d. R. Johann Schmidt.
- Dachschaden – "roof damage"; a head wound, more commonly used in the sense of "gone bonkers", "Section 8"
- Daimler-Benz (DB) – a producer of military vehicles, and engines to power both German aircraft and surface vehicles.
- Deckung – Cover. "In Deckung!" means "Take cover!", and "In Deckung bleiben!" means "Stay under cover!" Compare Tarnung, meaning "concealment" or "camouflage".
- Deutsches Afrikakorps (DAK) – German troops sent to North Africa under the command of Erwin Rommel to prevent the loss of Libya to the British by the Italians. The term is properly used to refer to Rommel's original force of two divisions that landed in Libya on 14 February 1941 (which stayed as a distinct formation for the remainder of the North African Campaign), but often refers to all German forces that operated in North Africa, eventually consisting of several divisions and corps and formed into an entire Panzer Army.
- Deutsche Ausrüstungswerke (DAW; German Armament Works) – an armaments organization established in 1939 under SS control.
- Deutsche Minenräumleitung (DMRL) – German mine-sweeping group
- Dienst – service.
- Division – in the army and air force a military formation, in the navy either a sub-unit of a squadron or trainings units of battalion size.
  - Divisionsarzt – medical officer of a division.
  - Divisionskommandeur – commanding officer of a division, typically a General officer. In the imperial army this was the post of a Generalleutnant.
- Dienstdolch – service dagger (uniform dagger).
- Donnerbalken – "thunder beam"; latrine.
- Drahtverhau – barbed-wire entanglement. Slang term used by German soldiers during World Wars I and II for a military-issue mixture of dried vegetables.
- Drang nach Osten – "Push to the East", Germany's ambitions for territorial expansion into Eastern Europe.
- Düppel – German code name for radar chaff, used by the Royal Air Force as Window, possibly from düpieren (to dupe). or from a suburb of Berlin of the same name, where it was allegedly first found near.

=== E ===
- Eagle's Nest – English name given to Hitler's mountain-top summerhouse at Berchtesgaden in the Bavarian Alps, not far from the Berghof. In German, it is known as the Kehlsteinhaus. Hitler, however, visited the property only ten times and each visit was under 30 minutes.
- EG z.b. V. – Einsatzgruppe zur besonderen Verwendung – SS Special Purpose Operational Group.
- Ehrendolch – literally, "honor dagger", a presentation dagger awarded for individual recognition, especially by the SS.
- Eichenlaubträger – holder of Oak Leaves to the Knight's Cross of the Iron Cross.
- Eid – oath. The current oath when joining the Bundeswehr is "Ich gelobe, der Bundesrepublik Deutschland treu zu dienen, und das Recht und die Freiheit des deutschen Volkes tapfer zu verteidigen" ("I pledge to faithfully serve the Federal Republic of Germany and to bravely defend the right [law] and the freedom of the German people"). For soldiers joining for an extended period of time beyond the mandatory conscription of nine months, "so wahr mir Gott helfe" ("so help me God") is optionally added.
- Einfall – invasion.
- Eingeschlossen – encirclement, surrounded, cut off.
- Eingreif division – interlocking (counter-attack) division (1917–1918).
- Einheit – detachment or unit.
- Einheitsfeldmütze – standard field cap
- Einsatz – duty, mission, deployment, action.
- Einsatzbereit – statement meaning, "Ready for action."
- Einsatzgruppen – "mission groups", or "task forces". Einsatzgruppen were battalion-sized, mobile killing units made up of SiPo, SD or SS Special Action Groups under the command of the RSHA. They followed the Wehrmacht into occupied territories of Eastern Europe and the Soviet Union. These units were supported by units of the uniformed German Order Police (Orpo) and auxiliaries of volunteers (Estonian, Latvian, Lithuanian, and Ukrainian). Their victims, primarily Jews, were executed by shooting and were buried in mass graves from which they were later exhumed and burned. At least one million Jews were killed in this manner. There were four Einsatzgruppen (A, B, C, D), which were subdivided into company-sized Einsatzkommandos.
- Einsatzkommando – company-sized subunits of the Einsatzgruppen that took care of the mobilization and killing of Jews, partisans, Communists and others during the German invasion into the Soviet Union.
- Einsatz Reinhard (Mission/Action "Reinhard") – code name given on 4 June 1942 for the assignment to exterminate all Polish Jews in honor of SS Deputy Chief Reinhard Heydrich who had been assassinated by Czech nationalists during a covert operation.
- Einsatztrupp (Troop Task Force) – smallest of the Einsatzgruppen units responsible for liquidations in the German-occupied territories.
- Einwohner – resident, inhabitant.
- Eisenbahn – "iron road"; railroad.
- Eisernes Kreuz – "iron cross"; medal awarded for valorous service, and the German national military insignia from 1910 to the beginning of spring 1918, and once again from 1955 (with the establishment of the Bundeswehr) to today.
- Eiserne Kuh – "iron cow"; evaporated milk
- Eiserne Ration – "iron ration"; emergency rations
- El Alamein (October–November 1942) – crucial battle of WW2 pitting the British under General Montgomery's 8th Army (approximately 1200 tanks) against General Erwin Rommel's Afrika Korps (500 tanks) and fought primarily in Egypt. Outnumbered and outgunned, the Germans never regained the operational initiative, forcing Rommel to withdraw the bulk of his forces into Libya, marking the final stages of the Nazis' North African campaign.
- Elefant – "Elephant"; a heavy Panzerjäger (tank hunter or tank destroyer) built on the chassis of Porsche's unsuccessful prototypes for the Tiger tank, and mounting the 88mm L/71 PaK 43.
- Elektra – a German radio-navigational system.
- Endlösung or Endziel – the "Final Solution"; refers to the genocide planned against the Jewish people.
- Endsieg – final victory.
- Enigma – German message encryption equipment.
- Ententeich – duck pond, maritime manoeuvre to create an area of calm sea in order to lower boats into the water or land aircraft
- Entmenscht – bestial, inhuman, brutish.
- Entscheidender Sieg – decisive victory.
- Entwicklung series, more commonly known as the E-series, was a late-World War II attempt by Germany to produce a standardised series of tank designs.
- Einsatzgruppen reports – Einsatzgruppen commanders' report delivered daily to the Reich Security Main Office (RSHA) in Berlin which comprehensively listed secretly coded murder activities in the occupied territories along the Eastern Front.
- Erobert – conquered.
- Erkennungsmarke – identity tag; "dog tag".
- Erprobungsstelle – test centre.
- Ersatz – substitute, replacement, reserves; could refer to replacement troops or any substance used in place of another (e.g., ersatz coffee, ersatz rubber, etc.).
- Ersatzbataillone or Marschbataillone – coherent military replacement groups.
- Erschießungsaktion – Shooting action usually carried out by a member of a firing squad (Erschießungskommando).
- Etappe – the rear to the front.
- Etappendienst – German naval intelligence department.
- Etappenschwein – (slang) "rear swine" (REMF), a soldier with a safe job away from danger. The "Etappenhengst" (stallion) was also commonly used. Compare with Frontschwein.
- Exerzierpanzer – practice or exercise tank.
- Exzellenz – honorary address for a General officer from the rank of Generalleutnant upwards in the Prussian and Imperial Army

=== F ===
- Fahndung Funk (F. Fu.: Radio Search) – department of German Military Intelligence tasked to locate forbidden radio transmitters in France.
- Fahne (pl. Fahnen) – flag or banner.
- Fahnenjunker – lowest officer candidate rank equivalent to Unteroffizier (Corporal)
- Fahnenflucht – desertion
- Fahnenschmied – farrier NCO
- Fähnlein (Squad) – unit of the Deutsches Jungvolk within the Hitler Youth.
- Fähnrich – officer candidate rank equivalent to Feldwebel (Sergeant). A Fähnrich is an NCO, though, and will have commensurable tasks.
- Fähnrich zur See – naval officer candidate rank equivalent to Bootsmann (Petty Officer 1st Class). A Fähnrich zur See is an NCO, though, and will have commensurable tasks.
- Fall – "case." A name for a German operation. The most important German offensives were called "cases," as they were viewed as problems to be solved.
- Fallschirmjäger – paratroopers; German airborne troops.
- FdM – Führer der Minensuchboote
- FdU – Führer der Unterseeboote; Commander-in-Chief of U-boats (used from World War I to 1939, when the title was reduced to "Regional Commander").
- FdV – Führer der Vorpostenboote
- Feigling – coward.
- Feind – enemy. "Feindlich-" is used as an adjective, such as "feindliche Truppen" (enemy troops) or "feindliche Stellung" (enemy position).
- Feindfahrt – "enemy trip"; in U-boat terminology, a war cruise or combat patrol against the enemy.
- Feindbild – "enemy image"; prejudiced 'bogeyman' image of the enemy.
- Feld – field.
- Feldersatzbatallion – field replacement battalion, usually one per infantry division.
- Feldflasche – canteen.
- Feldflieger Abteilung – "field airmen's section", abbreviated as "FFA". The earliest form of Fliegertruppe German Army (Deutsches Heer) flying unit in World War I, first formed in 1914 with six two-seater observation aircraft per unit.
- Feldgendarmerie – Field Gendarmerie or "Field Police", the military police units of the Wehrmacht.
- Feldgrau – "field gray"; the color of the ordinary German soldier's tunic – by extension the soldiers themselves.
- Feldjäger – military police detachments formed late in the war to root out deserters; later the name was applied to all military police units of the postwar Bundeswehr.
- Feldkoch – cook.
- Feldlazarett – field hospital.
- Feldpolizeibeamter – field police officer.
- Feldpost, Feldpostbrief – mail to and from troops at the front.
- Feldwebel – non-commissioned rank in the Heer and Luftwaffe, the most junior of the "Unteroffiziere mit Portepee" (senior NCO) ranks. Approximately equal to sergeant.
- Feldzug – military campaign
- Fernglas – binoculars; literally "remote glass".
- Fernmelde- – telecommunication.
- Fernsprech- – telephone.
- Festung – fortress.
- "Feuer auf mein Kommando" – "fire on my command".
- "Feuer Frei" – "fire at will".
- Feuerschutz – suppressive fire, covering fire.
- Feuerschutzpolizei – Fire Protection Police.
- Feuerwerker – ordnance NCO
- FlaK – Fliegerabwehrkanone, Flug(zeug)abwehrkanone – air defense gun; anti-aircraft artillery (AAA) (e.g., the "eighty-eight").
- FlaK-Helfer – "FlaK helper"; often underaged auxiliaries used to load and operate FlaK batteries and man searchlight batteries.
- Flakpanzer – armoured self-propelled antiaircraft gun, such as the Möbelwagen.
- Flakvierling – anti-aircraft, open turret-style weapon system employing a quartet (vierling) of 20mm autocannon, employed on land, in self-propelled mounts and on ships.
- Flammpanzer – flame-throwing tank.
- Flammenwerfer – flame-thrower.
- Flecktarn – spotted camouflage.
- Fliegerabwehr-Abteilung – anti-aircraft battalion.
- Fliegerabwehrkanone – see FlaK.
- Fliegerbombe (FliBo) – aerial bomb
- Fliegerdivision – lit. Flight division.
- Fliegerkorps – lit. Flight corps
- Fliegerschwert – airman's sword (part of an officer's regalia).
- Fliegertruppe – part of the official name (Die Fliegertruppen des Deutschen Kaiserreiches) of the Imperial German Army Air Service, existing under that name from 1910 to October 1916, when it was reorganized as the Luftstreitkräfte.
- Flotte – naval fleet
- Flottille (Fl.) – flotilla.
- Flucht nach vorn – "flight to the front"; trying to assault rather than wait or retreat while under threat.
- Flüchtlingslager – refugee camp.
- Flügelmann – wingman
- Flugbombe V-1 (V-1 flying bomb) – pulse-jet engine powered flying bomb carrying high-explosive warhead known to the Allies as the "buzz bomb".
- Flugzeug – aircraft.
- Flug(zeug)abwehrkanone – see FlaK.
- Flugzeugträger – aircraft carrier.
- Fluten – U-boat order; "Flood the tanks!"
- Formaldienst – drill and ceremony.
- Forschungsamt – intelligence service of the Luftwaffe.
- Forstschutz – see Forest Protection Command
- Frachter – freighter.
- Franktireure – Francs-tireurs
- Franktireurkrieg – partisan warfare.
- Fregattenkapitän – naval rank, literally meaning "frigate captain", in between Korvettenkapitän and Kapitän zur See. Commanded a light cruiser, or served as the executive officer on a capital ship, hence often translated as commander
- Freikorps – volunteer corps (see Freiwillige). The Freikorps was an early volunteer paramilitary organizations formed in the wake of the German defeat in the First World War making up the German army in lieu of the restrictions mandated by the Treaty of Versailles; they consisted primarily of demobilized soldiers, disillusioned young men, and fanatical conservative nationalists who blamed Social Democrats, Jews, and communists for Germany's problems.
- Freischärler – irregular or guerrilla (see Widerstandskräfte).
- Freischärlerunwesen – "pestering by guerrillas"; guerrilla activities or terrorist incidents.
- Freiwillige – volunteer.
- Fremde Heere Ost/West (FHO/FHW) – Foreign Armies East/West, staff intelligence specialist on the subject.
- Frieden – peace.
- Fritz-X – The Luftwaffe's radio-controlled glide bomb, precursor to today's "smart weapons" or PGMs.
- Fronterlebnis – front experience. Fronterlebnis was a literary genre which romanticized the war experience and the camaraderie of being 'brothers-in-arms'.
- Frontgemeinschaft – front-line comradeship or community; group of front-line combat soldiers.
- Frontkämpfer – front line soldier
- Frontschwein – (slang) "front pig" soldier serving long at the front, often used as an ironic accolade for a soldier with the will to fight. Compare with Etappenschwein.
- Der Führer – "The Leader"; title used by Adolf Hitler: Mein Führer, Der Führer.
- Führerbunker – (literally meaning "shelter [for the] leader" or "[the] Führer's shelter") was located about 8.2 metres beneath the garden of the old Reich Chancellery building at Wilhelmstraße 77, and about 120 metres north of Hitler's New Reich Chancellery building in Berlin. This underground bunker was Hitler's last FHQ and where he and his wife Eva Braun ended their lives on 30 April 1945.
- Führerhauptquartiere (FHQ) – a number of official headquarters especially constructed in order to be used by the Führer.
- Führersonderzug – a special train built for and used by the Führer.
- Führer – in the army a substitute commander of a unit or sub-unit in absence of the regular commander (see 'Chef'); in the navy a flag officer (e.g. Führer der Uboote)
- SS-Führungshauptamt – SS Leadership Head Office, the administrative headquarters of the Waffen-SS.
- Funke – 1) radio [die Funke, f., slang abbreviation for Funkgerät]; 2) spark [der Funke, m.]; the literal (pre-radio) meaning of the word.
- Funker – radio operator (from funken [verb], to transmit by radio).
- Funkgerät (prefix: FuG) – generic term for radio and airborne IFF, RDF and airborne and some ground-based radar equipment.
- Funkmessbeobachtungsgerät (FuMB) – radar detector.
- Füsilier – historic term often used to refer to light infantry, originally named after the fusil, or musket, such troops once carried. During World War II, a name given to infantry formations with some reconnaissance abilities that replaced an infantry division's reconnaissance battalion mid-war when the Germans reduced the number of standard infantry battalions in their divisions from 9 to 6.
- Füsilierbataillon – in the Imperial army the 3rd battalion of a Grenadier-Regiment. Its designation was F, as in F/GR10 for Füsilierbataillon of the Genadier-Regiment 10.
- Futtermeister – quartermaster responsible for fodder
- Freya radar – first operational radar with the Kriegsmarine.

=== G ===
- Gabelschwanzteufel – P-38 Lightning "Fork Tailed Devil".
- Garnison – garrison
- Gasmaske – gas mask
  - Gasmaskenbehälter – gas mask container.
- Gaspistole – starting pistol; a gun that fires blanks.
- Gau – An administrative region equivalent to a shire or province.
- Gauleiter – supreme territorial or regional Nazi party authority(-ies). Gau leader.
- Gebirgsjäger – mountain troops; a mountain "unit" might be referred to as either Gebirgs or Gebirgsjäger.
- Gebirgstruppe – mountain troops.
- gefallen (gef.) – fallen, killed in action
- Gefecht – combat, action.
- Gefechtsgepäck – infantry assault pack.
- Gefechtsstand – command post.
- Gefechtsstation – naval term, "battle stations" or (more literally) "combat stations".
- Gefechtsverband – defensive aerial tactic employed against USAAF heavy bombers when Zerstörer twin-engined heavy fighters had proven too vulnerable to Allied single-engined fighters – used heavily armed Fw 190As as bomber destroyers in place of the slower Zerstörer aircraft, with Bf 109Gs for escort.
- Gefreiter – enlisted rank, senior to privates but not considered an NCO.
- Gegenangriff – counterattack.
- Gegenoffensive – counter-offensive.
- Gegenstoß – hasty counter-attack.
- Gegenschlag – counter stroke.
- geheim – secret.
- Geheime Feldpolizei (GFP) – Secret Field Police. It was Germany's secret military police that was organised by the German high command (OKW) in July 1939 to serve with the Wehrmacht. It was mainly designed to carry out security work in the field, as the executive agent of the Abwehr.
- Geheimfernschreiber – (literally, "secret distance writer") cipher machine.
- Gelbkreuz – mustard gas
- Geleit – escort.
- Geleitschutz – convoy.
- Gemeindepolizei – local police.
- Gemeinschaft – community.
- Gendarmerie – rural police, posted in communities smaller than 2,000 inhabitants.
- Generalfeldmarschall – Field Marshal.
- Generalkommando – the headquarters of an army corps.
- Generalstab des Heeres (Gen. St.d. H.) – German Army General Staff.
- gepanzert (gep.) – armoured.
- Geschütz – cannon, gun.
- Geschützführer – gun captain / commander / layer.
- Geschwader – originally and literally a naval "squadron" and, therefore, equivalent to the French escadre or Italian squadriglia; in military aviation, the translation varies:
  - World War I Luftstreitkräfte: a unit comprising four fighter Staffeln, such as Jagdgeschwader 1 (JG 1) –the famous "Flying Circus", led by Manfred von Richthofen ("The Red Baron"); also used for the Kagohl and Bogohl heavy bomber units, the last two mentioned unit types specifically tied to the Oberste Heeresleitung or "OHL";
  - World War II Luftwaffe: comprising three or more Gruppen, each made up of three (or sometimes four) Staffeln; a WW2 Geschwader was equivalent to a British Commonwealth air force group, a French escadron, an Italian stormo, an IJAAS hikōdan, an IJNAC sentai, a Soviet aviation division, a USAAF/USMC air wing, and/or a US Navy carrier air group;
  - current Luftwaffe: a Geschwader comprises a "technical group" (Technische Gruppe), a "flying group" (Fliegende Gruppe), along with two or three other flying Staffeln;
- Geschwaderkennung – the two-character alphanumeric identification code used by a non-day-fighter Geschwader for unit identification, that appeared to the left of the fuselage Balkenkreuz on most World War II Luftwaffe aircraft. It also included two letters to the right of the cross, the third letter designating the aircraft's individual identification, with the fourth letter designating the aircraft's assigned squadron (Staffel) within the unit.
- Gestapo – Geheime Staatspolizei – Secret State Police. Originally the Prussia secret state police and later (as part of the SiPo then merged into the RSHA) the official secret police force of Nazi Germany. Gestapo was derived as follows: Geheime Staatspolizei.
- Gewehr – rifle, such as the Gewehr 43.
- Gift – poison; giftig: poisonous, toxic.
- Gleichschaltung – "coordination", literally "parallel switching", coordination of everything into Nazi ideals.
- Gliederung – table of organisation
- Goldfasan (Golden pheasant) – derogatory slang term for high-ranking Nazi Party members. Derived from the brown-and-red uniforms similar to the colors of male pheasants and the perceived behaviour of high-ranking party officials living in peace and luxury at home.
- Gotenstellung – Gothic Line German defense line in Italy, north of Florence.
- Grabenkrieg – trench warfare.
- Granate – grenade, used not only for hand grenades (Handgranate) but also for other explosive ordnance such as mortar (Werfergranate) and armor-piercing (Panzergranate) shells.
- Granatwerfer (GrW) – mortar.
- Grenadier – traditional term for heavy infantry, adopted during World War II from mid-war onward as a morale-building honorific, replacing the terms "infantry" and "Schützen", often indicative of low-grade formations. See also Panzergrenadier.
- Grenze – border.
- Grenzschutz – border patrol.
- Greuelerzählungen – atrocity stories, term meant to counter Allied propaganda regarding German atrocities.
- Gröfaz [de] – German soldiers' derogatory acronym for Größter Feldherr aller Zeiten, a title initially publicized by Nazi propaganda to refer to Adolf Hitler during the early war years; literally, the "Greatest Field Commander of all Time".
- Grundausbildung (abbr. Grundi) – basic training
- Gruppe (Luftwaffe) – a gruppe usually consisted of three Staffeln of nine to twelve aircraft. An equivalent would be a US or French group. In Commonwealth air forces the equivalent would be a wing.
- Gruppe (Heer) – in the army a gruppe is the equivalent to a squad
- Gruppenführer – squad leader, also a Nazi party rank.
- Gruppenhorchgerät (GHG) – hydrophone array.
- Gulaschkanone – "goulash cannon", mobile field kitchen
- Gruppenstab – command staff.
- Gustav Line – German defense line in Italy, centered on the monastery of Monte Cassino.
- GvD – Gefreiter vom Dienst – soldier who is the runner of CQ.

=== H ===
- Hafen – harbour. "Flughafen" is airport.
- Hafthohlladung – German magnetically adhered, shaped charge anti-tank grenade munition, ironically the type of ordnance that if the Allies also possessed them, Zimmerit was meant to prevent the use of.
- Hakenkreuz – (literally, "hooked cross") the swastika symbol used by the Nazi Party.
- "Halbe Fahrt!" – naval command calling for half-speed. "Halbe Fahrt voraus" is "half-speed ahead" and "Halbe Fahrt zurück" is "half-speed reverse".
- Halsschmerzen – "sore throat" or "itchy neck"; used to describe a reckless or glory-seeking commander, implying an obsession with winning the Knight's Cross.
- Halt – Stop! Freeze!
- Handelsmarine – German merchant marine.
- Hannoversche Maschinenbau AG (Hanomag) – producer of military vehicles, principally the Sd.Kfz. 251 medium-armoured halftrack.
- "Hart..." – naval command calling for a sharp turn. "Hart Backbord" is "hard-a-port" and "Hart Steuerbord" is "hard-a-starboard".
- Härteübung – hardiness training.
- Haubitze – howitzer.
- Hauptamt Sicherheitspolizei (HA-SiPo) – Security Police headquarters.
- Hauptbahnhof – main or central station.
- Hauptfeldwebel – company sergeant-major or first sergeant.
- Hauptkampflinie (HKL) – literally main combat line, official term for "front" until the end of World War II.
- Hauptmann – army captain.
- Hauptquartiere (HQ) – headquarters.
- Hauptstadt – capital city.
- Hauptwachtmeister – company first sergeant in artillery and cavalry units.
- Heckenschütze – "hedge marksman" hidden, ambushing sniper.
- Heckschütze – tail gunner the man to handle the Heckstand.
- Heckstand – tail gun defensive position on aircraft.
- Heer – regular German Army. Can also be used for any national army.
- Heeresgruppenkommando (HGr.Kdo) – army group command.
- Heimat – home, homeland.
- Heimatkurs – the way home. Literally "homeland course".
- Heimatschuß – "homeland shot"; a wound not severe enough to be permanently disabling, but of sufficient severity to require evacuation from the battlefront. The German soldier's equivalent of the American G.I.'s "million-dollar wound" or the British soldier's "Blighty wound".
- Heldenklau – "stealing" or "snatching of heroes"; slang term used to denote the practice of commandeering rear-echelon personnel for front-line service. The term is alluding to a Nazi propaganda figure "Kohlenklau", meant to promote energy frugality.
- Henschel – railroad locomotive and rolling stock manufacturer, and a firm responsible for many German World War II weapons systems for both the Wehrmacht Heer and the Luftwaffe, especially the heavy Tiger I and Tiger II tanks and the Henschel Hs 293 guided anti-ship missile.
- "Herr..." – In past and modern German military protocol, "Herr" ("mister") is said before ranks when someone is addressing a person of higher rank. For example, a lieutenant ("Leutnant") would address his captain as "Herr Hauptmann" ("Mr. Captain"). Superior officer address subordinates with "Herr" and their last name or simply their rank, but not adding "Herr" to the rank. This practice was forbidden in the Waffen-SS, as it offended Himmler's egalitarian principles.
- Hetzer – agitators; also a hunting dog ("baiter") and as such the unofficial name of a certain mid-war model of German tank destroyer.
- Hilfswillige (Hiwis) – German Army volunteer forces usually made up of Soviet volunteers serving in non-combat capacities.
- Himmelfahrtskommando – literally, "trip to heaven mission", a suicide mission.
- Hinterhalt – ambush.
- Hitler-Jugend (HJ) – Hitler Youth. The German youth organization founded by the Nazi Party (NSDAP). Made up of the Hitlerjugend proper, for male youth ages 14–18; the younger boys' section "Deutsches Jungvolk" for ages 10–14; and the girls' section "Bund Deutscher Mädel" (BDM).
- Hitlersäge – "Hitler saw", nickname of the MG42 machine gun. Also named "Singende Säge" (singing saw), "Knochensäge" (bone saw) or "Hitlersense" (Hitler scythe)
- HJ-Fahrtenmesser (Hitler Youth knife) – common knife specially designed for the Hitler Jugend.
- HJ-Spätlese – nickname for the Volkssturm. "Spätlese" being the term for late season harvest grapes, for more mature wines.
- Höckerhindernisse – anti-tank obstacles often referred to as "Dragon's Teeth".
- Hoheitsabzeichen – national insignia e.g. on a tank or aircraft.
- Hohentwiel – FuG 200 UHF-band (500 MHz) maritime patrol airborne radar gear.
- Hubschrauber – helicopter.
- Hufbeschlagschmied, farrier.
- Hummel – "bumble-bee"; nickname for a piece of mobile artillery.
- Hundehütte – literally, "dog house", punishment hut.

=== I ===
- im Dienst (i.D.) – in service.
- Indianer – Indians. Luftwaffe slang for an enemy fighter (from the game of cowboys and Indians.)
- Infanterie (Inf.) – infantry.
- Inhaber der Befehls- und Kommandogewalt (IBuK) – commander-in-chief, minister of defence (peacetime) or federal chancellor (wartime)
- Iststärke – actual strength (compared to Soll-Stärke)
- Iwan – German slang for a Soviet soldier (similar to "Jerry" or "Kraut", the British and American slang terms for Germans).

=== J ===
- Jabo (Jagdbomber) – fighter-bomber.
- Jagdgeschwader (JG) – single-engine fighter wing/group, literally hunting squadron.
- Jagdpanzer – "hunting tank"; armoured casemate-style self-propelled tank destroyer.
- Jagd-Kommando – "hunting commando"; generally refers to a commando outfit that remained behind enemy lines when an area was overrun and would carry out sabotage and other guerrilla actions. These units did not generally operate as such and were later taken over by the SS and used as frontline combat troops in 1944–1945.
- Jäger – [1] light infantry; used alone or as part of a specialty such as Gebirgsjäger or Fallschirmjäger. [2] Fighter Airplane. The root Jagd- is also used in its literal meaning of "hunter" for weapon systems such Jagdtiger.
- jawohl – simply the word "yes" with the emphatic "wohl", which one might translate as "Yes, indeed!", "Aye, aye, sir!" or "Absolutely yes!" Widely used in World War II.
- Junkerschule – SS officer academy.

=== K ===
- "Kaczmarek" – wingman
- Kadavergehorsam – "absolute duty and blind obedience till death."; lit.: "carcass obedience"
- Kaiserliche Marine (KM) – Imperial German Navy
- Kaiserlicher Yacht-Club (KYC) – Imperial Yacht Club
- Kameradschaft – small military unit, or phrase for "comrade support amongst soldiers" (see Volkgemeinschaft).
- Kampf – struggle, fight or conflict.
- Kampfeinsitzer Kommando (KEK), the first specialist, single-seat armed scout/fighter units of the Fliegertruppe predecessor of the Luftstreitkräfte, first formed by Inspektor-Major Friedrich Stempel in February 1916, and the direct predecessor units to the Jagdstaffeln fighter squadron units first formed in the late summer of 1916.
- Kampfflotte – battle fleet.
- Kampfgeist – fighting spirit.
- Kampfgeschwader (KG) – bomber wing (USAAF practice)/group (RAF practice)
- Kampfgruppe – 1. an Army battlegroup or task force; formal designation of an ad hoc task force, or informal term for a combat unit at greatly reduced strength. 2. In the Luftwaffe, a bomber unit equivalent to a US/French group or a British Commonwealth wing.
- Kampfmesser – combat knife.
- Kampfplan – battle plan.
- Kampfschwimmer – frogman.
- Kampfzone – battle zone.
- Kampfwunde – battle injury.
- Kanone – gun (as opposed to a howitzer).
- Kanonier – gunner
- Kapitän – naval rank of captain; in full Kapitän zur See (KzS or Kpt.z.S.); literally, sea captain. Commanded any capital ship.
- Kapitänleutnant (Kptlt.) – naval rank of lieutenant commander or (literally) captain lieutenant. Officers of this rank generally command small vessels such as U-boats and minesweepers. The rank is often shortened to "Kaleun", with junior officers addressing people of this rank as "Herr Kaleun".
- Kapitulation – surrender.
- Kapo – overseer, NCO (sl). Esp. a prisoner who acted as an overseer of his fellow inmates in the Nazi concentration camps (see Konzentrationslager).
- Karbol- – slang prefix for anything related to the sanitary branch, e.g. "Karbol-Miezen" ("K. pussy or prostitutes") for nurses.
- Karbol-Tränke – field dressing station. Name derived from Karbol, carbolic acid, a disinfectant with characterictal odour.
- Kartenstelle – mapping detachment, normally part of staff company of a division or higher
- Kaserne – barracks, casern.
- Kavallerie (Kav.) – cavalry.
- KdE – abbreviation for the Kommandeur der Erprobungsstellen, the commander of all German military aviation test facilities in World War II, an office held by Colonel (Oberst) Edgar Petersen late in the war.
- Kesselschlacht – lit. "cauldron battle" encirclement often shortened to Kessel e.g. "Kessel von Stalingrad"
- Kette – chain, in the air force a sub-unit of 3–6 aircraft
- Ketten – chains, chain-drive, tracks (e.g. Panzerketten)
- Kettenantrieb – track, such as a tank track; tracked vehicle.
- Kettenhund – "chained dog", slang for a Military Policeman (derived from the metal gorget worn on a chain around the neck).
- Kettenkraftrad – a tracked motorcycle; also Kettenkrad.
- Kindersärge – "children's coffins", slang term applied to small, wooden antipersonnel box-mines.
- KLA: Kriegsschiffbaulehrabteilung – was a warship-construction training division that supervised a Baubelehrung.
- Kleinkampfverband (K-Verband) – special naval operations unit, comprising a few frogmen.
- Kleinkrieg – guerrilla war.
- Knickebein – "crooked leg", also "bent leg" (in the sense of "dogleg"); German navigational system using radio beams to guide bombers.
- Knochensammlung – gathering the bones of dead soldiers.
- Kochgeschirr – mess tin
- Koffer – in the Bundeswehr a derogatory term for a raw recruit
- Koffer, schwerer – large calibre shell, similar to the British coal box or the American trash can
- Kolonne – column, also supply units (e.g. leichte Infanterie-Kolonne)
- Kommandanten-Schießlehrgang – U-boat Commander's Torpedo Course.
- Kommando (Kdo.) – command; detachment; detail.
- Kommissarbefehl – the notorious 6 June 1941 "Commissar Order" to kill all political commissars in the Red Army and civil government.
- Kompanie (Kp.) – company, unit.
  - Kompaniechef – company commander
  - Kompaniefeldwebel – company first sergeant
  - Kompanieführer – substitute company commander in case of absence or if the ‘Kompaniechef ’ is only an honorary function (similar to a colonel-in-chief)
  - Kompanietruppführer – company headquarters section leader
- Konteradmiral – naval rank of rear admiral.
- Konzentrationslager (KZL) – concentration camp.
- Korvettenkapitän (K.Kpt) – naval rank of (literally) "corvette captain". The grade senior to Kapitänleutnant; frequently translated as either lieutenant commander or commander. Typically commanded a destroyer.
- Krad (Kraft-Radfahrzeug) – motorcycle (dated in civil use, but still common in the Bundeswehr).
- Krad-Melder – motorcycle dispatch rider
- Kradschütze(n) – motorcycle unit or soldier.
- Kraft – strength.
- Kraftei – literally "power-egg", used both for the unitized aviation engine installation system that combined all major engine ancillary components (radiator, oil cooler, etc.) with the engine itself, into a single interchangeable unit for ease of field maintenance and rapid replacement, or as a slang term for the short-fuselaged Messerschmitt Me 163 Komet rocket fighter.
- Krankenstation – sick bay of a ship.
- Krankenträger – stretcher bearer
- Kraut – for sauerkraut; slang term used by Americans to refer to Germans.
- Krieg or Krieg(s)- – "war" or "wartime-".
- Kriegserlebnis – (myth of the) war experience.
- Kriegsfischkutter (KFK) – patrol vessels constructed to a fishing-vessel design; (see Vorpostenboote).
- Kriegsflagge – "war ensign"; military form of the national flag, quartered by a black cross with an Iron Cross in the canton.
- Kriegsgefangener – prisoner of war.
- Kriegsgericht – court-martial; also used as slang for a war dish or poor meal. Also "Militärgericht".
- Kriegsmarine – German Navy, 1935–45.
- Kriegsneurose – battle fatigue. Mod. post traumatic stress disorder.
- Kriegsstärkenachweisungen (KStN) – the German equivalent of the American table of organization and equipment (TO&E) or the British war establishment.
- Kriegstagebuch – war diary.
- Kriminalpolizei (Kripo) – "Criminal Police" – in Nazi Germany, it became the national Criminal (investigative) Police Department for the entire Reich in July 1936. It was merged, along with the Gestapo, into the Sicherheitspolizei (SiPo). Later, in 1939, it was folded into the RSHA.
- Krupp (Kp) – famous German steel producer, manufactured most of the tanks, howitzers and heavy mortars, as well as armour plates for battleships (most famously the Bismarck).
- Krupp-Daimler (KD) – see Krupp.
- Kübel – literally, "bucket" or "tub", short for Kübelwagen, open-topped military utility cars with bucket seats.
- Kugel – "bullet" (also "ball").
- Kugelfest – bullet-proof.
- Kugelblitz – literally "ball lightning", fireball.
- KwK – abbreviation for "Kampfwagenkanone", the turret-mounted main (cannon) armament of a main battle tank.

=== L ===
- L/ – length of barrel in calibres (For example, an 8.8 cm L/71 gun would have a barrel of 71 x 8.8 cm = 624.8 cm long)
- Ladeschütze – loader
- Lager – camp.
- Landekopf – beachhead.
- Lafette – literally "gun mount", used for many differing artillery carriages and for manned and remotely controlled gun turret installations on German military vehicles, especially on aircraft.
- Landratsamt – civil administration office.
- Landsturm – historically, infantry of non-professional soldiers; a kind of militia.
- Landser – historical term for a German infantryman; slang: "Schütze Arsch".
- Landwehr – Territorial Army, a type of militia.
- Lastensegler – cargo glider
- Latrinenparole – "latrine talk", rumor.
- laufende Nummer – serial number.
- Lebensraum – "living space", or in Hitler-speak the minimum space the German people needed to live in.
- Lehr – "demonstration"; usually part of the name of an elite formation used as or mobilized from instructional troops (e.g., Panzer-Lehr-Division).
- Leibermuster – a camouflage pattern.
- leicht – "light", usually to refer a lighter type, such as light tank: leichter Panzer. Several classes of divisions were also classified as "light".
- Leopard – the name originally used for the Porsche-produced VK 30.01(P) prototype tank hull design and the Planned VK 16.02 Reconnaissance Vehicle, and later used by the Federal German Republic for the Leopard 1 and Leopard 2 Bundeswehr main battle tanks in service from the 1960s into the 21st century.
- Leuchtpistole – flare pistol
- Leuchtgeschoss/-granate – star shell
- Leutnant – army rank, equivalent to second lieutenant
- Leutnant zur See – naval rank, equivalent to ensign
- Lichtenstein – German airborne radar used for nightfighting, in early UHF-band BC and C-1 versions, and later VHF-band SN-2 and SN-3 versions.
- Lorenz Schlüsselzusatz – German cipher machine.
- Lorenz (navigation) – pre-war blind-landing aid used at many airports. Most German bombers had the radio equipment needed to use it.
- "Los!" – "Go!" or "Away!" Also the U-boat command to fire a torpedo ("Fire!")
- Luchs – "lynx"; nickname given to the Model L version of the Panzer II.
- Leuchtkugel – signal flare.
- Luftangriff – air attack, air raid.
- Luftflotte – lit. air fleet. Largest sub-units within the Luftwaffe.
- Luftschutz – air raid protection
- Luftwaffe – "air force"; the German Air Force.
- Luftwaffenhelfer – "Luftwaffe assistant"; see FlaK-Helfer.
- Luftschutzpolizei – (Air Raid Protection Police) was the civil protection service in charge of air raid defence and rescue victims of bombings in connection with the Technische Nothilfe (Technical Emergency Service) and the Feuerschutzpolizei (professional fire departments). Created as the Security and Assistance Service (Sicherheits und Hilfsdienst) in 1935, it was renamed "Luftschutzpolizei" in April 1942, when transferred from the aegis of Ministry of Aviation to the Ordnungspolizei.
- Luftstreitkräfte – originally (October 1916) the name for the Imperial German Army Air Service of World War I, later part of the name for the East German dedicated air arm.

=== M ===
- Mannschaften – enlisted personnel
- Maschinenfabrik Augsburg-Nürnberg (M.A.N.) – Augsburg-Nuremberg Machine Factory; a German engineering works and truck manufacturer. Now called MAN AG, and primary builder of the Panther tank.
- Marineausrüstungsstelle (Mast.) – naval equipment store
- Marinestosstruppkompanie (MSK) – elite German naval infantry of Kriegsmarine.
- Maschinenfabrik Niedersachsen Hannover (MNH) – weapon (tank) development and production firm.
- Maschinengewehr (MG) – machine gun, as in the MG42.
- Maschinengewehrschütze – machine gunner
- Maschinenkanone (MK) – an autocannon used for aircraft armament, as with the MK 108 30mm calibre weapon.
- Maschinenpistole (MP or MPi) – submachine gun, as in the MP40.
- Maschine – "machine". Commonly used as airplane or engine.
- Maskenball – German slang for fighting with NBC-protective gear, or at least with gas mask
- Maultier – Sd.Kfz. 4 half-track truck, German for mule
- Maus – "mouse"; nickname for a large, Porsche-designed super-heavy tank, the heaviest tank ever actually built and tested, that never passed beyond prototype stage.
- Maybach (M) – a German automotive and engineering company.
- Melder – runner
- Meldereiter – horse despatch rider
- Metox – radar warning receiver (named for manufacturer) fitted to U-boats; superseded by Naxos-U
- Milchkuh – "milk cow", nickname for the Type XIV resupply U-boat.
- Militär – military.
- Militärnachrichtendienst – military intelligence.
- Mine (pl. Minen) – an anti-personnel, tank or ship mine.
- Mineneigenschutz (MES) – ship's degaussing cable; literally "mine self-protection".
- Minensuchboote (M-boats) – large minesweepers.
- Mißliebige – undesirables.
- Mitarbeiter – assistant clerk
- Motorkanone – engine-mounted autocannon armament firing through a hollow propeller shaft on inline-engined fighter aircraft.
- MP(i) – sub-machine gun
- Mörser – mortar
- Munitionskanonier – ammunition handler
- Munitionsschlepper – ammunition carrier.
- Munitionsschütze – ammunition handler
- Mütze – cap or small hat, such as the M43 field cap, also known as the Einheitsfeldmütze.

=== N ===
- Nachricht(en) – signals / news / communication, also intelligence.
- Nachrichtendienst – intelligence
- Nachrichtenoffizier – signals officer
- Nachrichtentruppen – Signal Corps.
- Nachschub – supply
- Nachschubtruppen – supply troops.
- Nacht und Nebel – "night and fog"; code for some prisoners that were to be disposed of, leaving no traces; bei Nacht und Nebel (idiom) – secretly and surprisingly, at dead of night.
- Nachtjagdgeschwader (NJG) – night-fighter wing/group.
- Nahkampfmesser – close-combat fighting knife.
- Nahverteidigungswaffe – "close defense weapon"; an attachment to Panzers to combat close-assaulting infantry.
- Nashorn – "rhinoceros", nickname for a type of tank destroyer.
- Nationalsozialistische Führungsoffiziere (NSFO) – National Socialist Leadership Officers.
- NSDAP ~ Nationalsozialistische Deutsche Arbeiterpartei - National-Socialist German Workers' Party
- Naxos radar detector – the FuG 350 radar detector set; "Naxos Z" was developed for night fighters, "Naxos U", was provided to U-boats, to locate Allied H2S microwave-band radar transmissions, not able to detect American H2X radar gear.
- Nebelwerfer (Nb. W) – "fog thrower"; rocket artillery, multi-barrel rocket launchers that could be used for smoke or high-explosive projectiles.
- Neptun radar – Low-to-mid VHF band (125 to 187 MHz) airborne intercept radar for night fighter aircraft, to take the place of the Lichtenstein SN-2 unit, which had been compromised by July–August 1944.
- Niederlage – defeat.
- "Nicht Schiessen" – Don't shoot in German
- Norden – north.
- Notsignal – distress signal.
- NSFK – the Nationalsozialistisches Fliegerkorps, or National Socialist Flyers Corps.
- NSKK – the Nationalsozialistisches Kraftfahrerkorps, or National Socialist Motor Corps.
- Nummer (Nr.) – "number"; some divisional organizations with a unit number but no combat assets, often converted to ordinary divisions later on. (E.g., Division Nr. 157.)

=== O ===
- Ober-* – higher; part of several military ranks and titles like Oberleutnant and "Oberkommando".
- Oberst – lit. "Uppermost" or "Seniormost," German equivalent of a colonel.
- Oberbefehlshaber des Heeres (Ob.d.H.) – Commander-in-Chief of the Army.
- Oberkommando des Heeres (OKH) – "High Command of the Army" and Army General Staff from 1936 to 1945.
- Oberkommando der Kriegsmarine (OKM) – "High Command of the (War) Navy".
- Oberkommando der Luftwaffe (OKL) – "High Command of the Air Force".
- Oberkommando der Wehrmacht (OKW) – "High Command of the Armed Forces". The OKW replaced the War Ministry and was part of the command structure of the armed forces of Nazi Germany.
- Oberste Heeresleitung (OHL) – "Supreme Army Command", the OHL was the highest level of command of the World War I Deutsches Heer.
- Offizier im Generalstab – General Staff officer
- Offizier-Lager (Oflag) – "officer camp"; German prisoner-of-war camp for Allied officers.
- Ordnungspolizei (Orpo) – "order police" – the regular uniformed police after their nationalization in 1936.
- Ordonnanzoffizier – aide-de-camp
- Ortskampf – combat in towns, urban warfare.
- Osten – east.
- Ostfront – eastern front (Russian Front)
- Ostjuden – eastern Jews in Poland.
- Ostmark – lit. Eastern march, post-Anschluss Austria.
- Ostlegionen – German eastern legions or eastern troops.
- Ostpreußen – province of East Prussia.

=== P ===
- Panjewagen – one-horse carriage in Eastern Europe.
- Panzer – "armour"; German word is derived from Old French pancier, meaning "armour for the belly". It can refer to a tank (see Panzerkampfwagen below) or to an armoured formation. (Panzer Division is literally "Tank Division"; the adjective for "armoured" is gepanzert.)
- Panzerabwehrkanone (PaK) – anti-tank gun; literally, "tank defence cannon", also used for the main armament for a typical casemate style turretless German tank destroyer.
- Panzerbefehlswagen (Pz. Bef.Wg) – the commanding tank of any panzer detachment; also used of purpose-built command tanks with extra radio gear.
- Panzerbüchse – anti-tank rifle
- Panzerbüchsenschütze – anti-tank rifleman
- Panzerfaust – literally "armour fist"; a light disposable infantry anti-tank weapon, a small recoilless gun firing a fin-stabilized shaped charge grenade, and a forerunner of the Soviet RPG (rocket-propelled grenade) although the Panzerfaust was more of a grenade launcher.
- Panzerführer – tank commander, literally "tank leader".
- Panzerkommandant – tank commander
- Panzerschreck – literally "armour terror," officially Raketenpanzerbüchse "rocket armour rifle;" a heavy re-usable infantry anti-tank weapon firing a rocket-propelled 88mm shaped charge grenade. Also called Ofenrohr ("stovepipe") for its appearance.
- Panzergrenadier – mechanized infantry; a soldier belonging to a mechanized infantry unit.
- Panzerjäger – "tank hunter(s)", anti-tank troops; also used by extension for their self-propelled tank destroyers (e.g., the Elefant) until superseded by the Jagdpanzer ("hunting tank") term.
- Panzerkampfwagen (Pzkpfw.) – "armoured fighting vehicle"; usually a reference to a type of tank with a 360° fully rotating turret for the main armament.
- Panzerschiffe – "armoured ships"; i.e., "pocket battleships".
- Panzerwaffe – German armoured forces.
- Papier – paper. Often used as paper of identification.
- Papierkrieg – paper war. The struggle to keep up with reports and record keeping
- Partei – political party.
- Pauke Pauke – code word for fighter pilots when engaging enemy aircraft (lit. 'Kettledrums')
- Pionier (pl. Pioniere) – combat engineer.
- Plattenpanzer – plate armour.
- Planoffizier – Triangulation officer
- Polizei – a Police forces of Nazi Germany.
- Porsche (P) – company that designed and produced tanks and other military vehicles. They now produce cars.
- Protze – limber, a horse-drawn two-wheel chariot that was hitched before a gun and usually transported munitions and crew. The term derives from the Italian "birazzo", a two-wheeled cart.
- Putsch – coup d'état; the sudden overthrow of a government by a small group, usually the military.
- Pyrrhussieg – Pyrrhic victory.

=== Q ===
- Quartiermeister – quartermaster
- Quist – one of several manufacturers of German helmets both during and after World War II.

=== R ===
- Radikale Niederwerfung – ruthless suppression.
- Räumboot (R-boot) – small motor minesweeper.
- Rasputitsa – semi-annual mud-season in Eastern Europe
- Regierung – government.
- Regimentsadjutant – regiment adjutant
- Regimentsarzt – Regimental Medical Officer
- Regimentschef – colonel of the regiment
- Regimentsführer – acting commanding officer of a regiment
- Regimentskommandeur – commanding officer of a regiment
- Regimentsveterinär – regimental veterinary officer
- Reich – realm, empire.
- Reichsarbeitsdienst (RAD) – compulsory labor service in Nazi Germany.
- Reichsbahn – government railway system.
- Reichsführer-SS – Reich Leader of the SS, an office held by Heinrich Himmler.
- Reichssicherheitshauptamt (RSHA) – "Reich Security Main Office or Reich Security Head Office"; created by Himmler in September 1939 to combine all German security and plainclothes police departments, including the Gestapo, Kripo and SD (Sicherheitsdienst der SS) into one umbrella organization with seven departments.
- Reichswehr – name for the German Armed Forces under the Weimar Republic, from 1919 to 1935.
- Reiter – cavalryman. See also Ritter.
- Rekrut – coll. rookie, recruit, member of the military in the basic training
- Rettungsboot – lifeboat.
- Richtkreisunteroffizier – Gun Director (NCO)
- Richtschütze – aiming gunner.
- Ringkanone (Rk) – built-up gun
- Ritter – knight, cavalier.
- Ritterkreuz – "knight's cross", usual abbreviated name for the Ritterkreuz des Eisernen Kreuzes (see next entry)
- Ritterkreuz des Eisernen Kreuzes – Knight's Cross (of the Iron Cross); award for valorous service for those who had already received the Iron Cross. Highest award class for bravery under fire or military leadership. 7318 of these were awarded during the war. Previous recipients of the Ritterkreuz would be awarded a higher degree of the same award, and then successively higher ones. The higher degrees are, in ascending order:
  - Ritterkreuz mit Eichenlaub – "knight's cross with oak leaves". 890 recipients during the war.
  - Ritterkreuz mit Eichenlaub und Schwerten – "knight's cross with oak leaves and swords". 159 recipients total, plus one honorary recipient (Japanese admiral Isoroku Yamamoto)
  - Ritterkreuz mit Eichenlaub, Schwerten und Brillanten – "knight's cross with oak leaves, swords, and diamonds": 27 recipients total.
  - Ritterkreuz mit Goldenem Eichenlaub, Schwertern und Brillanten: "knight's cross with golden oak leaves, swords, and diamonds": only one recipient.
- Ritterkreuzauftrag, "Knight's Cross job" – soldiers' slang for a suicidal mission.
- Ritterkreuzträger – a holder of the Knight's Cross.
- Rittmeister – Captain, used instead of Hauptmann in the cavalry, reconnaissance, and horse-transport waffen.
- Rollkommando – small motorized (rolling) task force (nonmilitary: band for hit-and-run crime)
- Rommelspargel – "Rommel's asparagus"; slanted and barb-wired poles placed in key places behind the Atlantic Wall with the intention of preventing paratroop and glider landings.
- Rotes Kreuz – Red Cross.
- Rotte – two of a kind, especially ships, boats or aircraft. Also the 'file' in rank and file
- Rottenführer – leader of a 'rotte', also a Nazi rank
- Rottenknecht – subordinate in a 'rotte'
- Rottenmann – see 'Rottenknecht'
- Rottmeister – first in a file of soldiers. Originally, soldiers would file 10 – 25 deep, but in the 19th century two files were standard, thus a 'rotte' described two of a kind. Also a (non-commissioned) officer in charge of a detachment of 50 cavalry.
- RSO – the Raupenschlepper Ost fully tracked artillery towing vehicle.
- Rückzug – retreat.

=== S ===
- S-mine – a common type of anti-personnel landmine.
- SA – see Sturmabteilung.
- Sachbearbeiter – clerk
- die Sahnefront – (the cream front) occupied Denmark during World War II, a lot of food, minuscule fighting.
- Sanitäter ('Sani') – combat medic
- Sanitätsoffizier – Medical officer
- Sanitätsunteroffizier – Medical NCO
- Sanka – acronym for Sanitätskraftfahrtzeug, a term for German field ambulances.
- Saukopf – "pig's head", used to refer to the shape of a gun mantlet or mount, alternatively called Topfblende in German military documents.
- Schanzzeug – entrenching tool; slang term for fork and knife.
- Schachtellaufwerk – name for the system of overlapped and interleaved road wheels used on German military half-track and armored fighting vehicles before and during World War II.
- Scharfschütze – "sharpshooter"; sniper, marksman.
- Schatten – "shadow"; division headquarters that controlled just a few combat assets, usually for the purpose of misleading enemy intelligence.
- Scheisskommando – latrine detail as referred to by survivors of the Konzentrationslager.
- Scheuch-schlepper – the adapted three-wheel agricultural tractor (named from the maker of the original agri-version) used to tow the Luftwaffe's Komet rocket fighter on the ground.
- Schiffchen – side cap
- Schirmmütze – officer's and senior NCO's peaked cap
- Schirrmeister – Supply Technician for vehicles, equipment and horse tack
- Schlacht – battle. "Von" is used for a general location and "um" is used for what exactly was being fought over; for example, the Battle of Midway is referred to as the "Schlacht um Midway" while the Battle of Trafalgar is called the "Schlacht von Trafalgar".
- Schlachtschiff – battleship.
- Schleichfahrt – silent running.
- schnell – fast.
- Schnellboot (S-Boot) – motor torpedo boat (British term: "E-boat", for "enemy").
- Schnelle Truppen – lit. "fast troops" mechanized troops (whether armour or infantry).
- Schräge Musik – "slanted music", obliquely upward/forward-firing offensive German night fighter armament.
- Schutzpolizei – "protection police", the urban police; largest component of the uniformed police or Ordnungspolizei.
- Schutzstaffel (SS) – "Protection Squadron", a major Nazi organization that grew from a small paramilitary unit that served as Hitler's personal body guard into an all-encompassing security, police and combat force. "SS" is formed from (S)chutz(s)taffel. Had a tri-force structure: Allgemeine-SS or "General SS", general main body of the Schutzstaffel; SS-Totenkopfverbände responsible for the concentration camps; SS-Verfügungstruppe made up of military "dispositional" troops which, in 1940, officially became part of the Waffen-SS.
- Schürze – "skirting", armour skirting added to tanks to give additional protection.
- Schusslinie – line of fire.
- Schütze – lit. shooter; member of the infantry. From 1920 to 1945 also the lowest military rank. see also Scharfschütze.
- Schützenpanzerwagen (SPW) – armoured half-track or self-propelled weapon.
- Schutzhaft – "protective custody"; a euphemism for the power to imprison people without judicial proceedings, typically in concentration camps.
- Schutzhaftbefehl – "protective custody order"; document declaring that a detained person desired to be imprisoned; normally this signature was forced by torture.
- Schwadron (plural: Schwadrone) – "squadron"; used in the cavalry, a squadron was basically company-sized.
  - Schwadronchef – company commander in the cavalry
  - Schwadronführer – acting company commander in the cavalry
  - Schwadrontruppführer – company HQ section leader in the cavalry
- Schwarm – Flight (military unit)
- Schwarze Kapelle – "Black Orchestra"; a group of conspirators within the German Army who plotted to overthrow Hitler and came near to successfully assassinating him on 20 July 1944.
- Schweinereien – "scandalous acts" (lit.: "acts of a pig"); (in a military context) crimes against civilians.
- schwer – (1) adjective meaning "heavy", the word "gross" (large) can mean the same; (2) hard/difficult.
- Schwerer Kreuzer – heavy cruiser.
- Schwerpunkt – main axis of attack
- Schwert – sword.
- Schwimmpanzer – amphibious or "swimming" tank.
- SD – see Sicherheitsdienst.
- Sd.Kfz. – Sonderkraftfahrzeug
- Seebataillon – naval infantry or marines.
- Seekriegsleitung (SKL) – directorate of the Naval War.
- Sehrohr – periscope; literally "looking tube".
- Sehrohrtiefe – periscope depth.
- Seitengewehr – bayonet.
- Selbstfahrlafette – self-propelled gun carriage.
- Selbstschutz – lit. "self protection"; ethnic German civilian militia in occupied Eastern Europe. V column ~ Fifth column ~ FREIKORPS EBBINGHAUS.
- Sicherheitsdienst (SD) – "security service"; the SS and Nazi Party security service. Later, the main intelligence-gathering, and counter-espionage sections of the RSHA; originally headed by Reinhard Heydrich.
- Sicherheitspolizei (SiPo) – "security police", the combined forces of the Gestapo and KriPo, made up of the Reich's criminal investigators and secret state police.
- "sichern und laden" – "lock and load".
- Sicherungsflottillen – (1) escort ships, (2) paramilitary organization of unemployed ex-soldiers, who were recruited to protect Nazi speakers, and because of their clothing were called "Brown Shirts".
- Sieg – victory.
- Sigrunen – the name of the double "S" runes used by the SS.
- SiPo – see Sicherheitspolizei.
- Sippenhaft – the practice of arresting members of a person's family for political crimes or treason committed by that person.
- SMS – abbreviation for Seiner Majestät Schiff, the German Empire's equivalent of the British Royal Navy's "HMS" (His/Her Majesty's Ship) naval vessel naming prefix before 1918.
- Soldat – military personnel in contrast to Beamte, Angesteller, Arbeiter.
- Soldbuch – pay book carried by every member of the German armed forces. Unit information, a record of all equipment issued, and other details were entered into this book.
- Sollstärke – authorized strength
- Sonderbehandlung – "special treatment"; a Nazi euphemism meaning torture or killing of people in detention.
- Sonderfahndungslisten – special wanted-persons list.
- Sonderkommando – "special unit"; during WWII, an official term that applied to certain German and foreign SS units that operated in German-occupied areas, who were responsible for the liquidation of persons not desirable to the Nazi government; ALSO: Jewish inmates of extermination camps, assigned to clear gas chambers of corpses, etc. During WWI, the term was used to refer to special fleet groups, i.e. the coastal defense force tasked with maintaining control over Dardanelles.
- Sonderkraftfahrzeug (Sd. Kfz.) – "special-purpose motor vehicle", usually abbreviated and referring to an Ordnance Inventory Number.
- Sonderreferat – special administrative section.
- Späher – scout.
- Spähtrupp – reconnaissance patrol
- Spähwagen – armoured car, scout/reconnaissance vehicle.
- Sperrfeuer – protective fire, curtain fire. (Anti air-) Artillery barrage to stop advancing troops
- Störfeuer – harassing fire
- Sperrlinie – blocking line.
- Sperrschule – Mine Warfare School at Kiel-Wik.
- Spieß – "pike"; colloquial name for the mustering and administrative non-commissioned officer of a company, the Hauptfeldwebel. Typically held the rank of Oberfeldwebel or Stabsfeldwebel. He exercised more authority than his American counterpart (First Sergeant), but his duties did not ordinarily include combat leadership.
- Spion – spy.
- Sprengstoff – explosive material.
- Sprung – an advance movement for infantry: jump up from cover, run a few steps, take cover again. Repeat.
- "Sprung auf, marsch, marsch!" – command to initiate a Sprung
- SS – see Schutzstaffel.
- SS-TV – SS-Totenkopfverbände (SS Death's Head Units).
- SS-Verfügungstruppen – "units available" or military formations of the SS; became the core of the Waffen-SS formed in August 1940.
- Stab (pl. Stäbe) – "staff", sometimes HQ.
- Stabschef – chief of staff.
- Stabsfeldwebel – lit. "Staff Sergeant", the highest NCO rank in the Wehrmacht but subordinate to the Spieß; the second highest NCO rank in the Bundeswehr.
- Stacheldraht – barbed wire.
- Stadtkommandant – military commandant of a city.
- Staffel – squadron; the smallest operational air unit, and the primary operational unit of the World War I era Luftstreitkräfte.
  - Staffelführer
  - Staffelkapitän
- Stahlhelm – (1) literally "steel helmet"; (2) inter-war nationalist paramilitary organization, later subsumed into the SA.
- Stalag – acronym for Stammlager, German prisoner-of-war camp for ranks other than officers.
- Stalinorgel – "Stalin's Organ"; nickname for the Katyusha rocket launcher.
- Stammkennzeichen – four-letter radio identification code applied to factory-fresh Luftwaffe aircraft, also used for prototype identification, not used on non-day-fighter aircraft assigned to a particular Luftwaffe wing, where a Geschwaderkennung code would be used instead.
- Standarte – SS/SA unit equivalent to a regiment
- Standort – garrison
- Standortältester – garrison commander
- Stellung – position
- Stellungskrieg – static warfare, contrary to Blitzkrieg, if neither of the conflict parties is able to overcome the defense with offensive operations, the result is an Abnützungskrieg.
- Stellungsunteroffizier – gun position NCO
- Steuerbord (Stb) – starboard side of a ship.
- Stielhandgranate – stick hand grenade: the "potato masher" Model 24 grenade.
- "stopfen" – a command to stop firing, probably derived from "stop your vents"
- Stoßtrupp – small unit as shock or attack troops.
- Stoß-[unit] – Stoßbataillon, Stoßregiment, Stoßdivision, a temporary designation for units, battalions, regiments or divisions that were held as mobile reserve and thus could be used to push (stoßen) an attacking force back in a counterattack. This term was first used in trench warfare in WWI, when in 1917 the defensive tactic of the German Army changed to in depth defense. The rationale was that frontline units in the trenches suffered so many casualties and material losses as not to be able to mount an effective counterstroke.
- Strategischer Sieg – strategic victory.
- Stube – room in the barracks, quarters
- Stuka – acronym for Sturzkampfflugzeug, literally: "downfall combat aircraft" figuratively: *dive-bombing aircraft". Particularly associated with the German Ju 87 dive bomber, although the German term refers to any dive bomber.
- Stukageschwader – a dive bomberwing/group, later Schlachtgeschwader in a ground support role (SG).
- Stupa – SturmPanzer, a Sturmpanzer IV assault gun.
- Sturm – assault, also a SS/SA unit size, comparable to a platoon.
- Sturmabteilung (SA) – "assault detachment," party militia, not part of the army. In the beginning the Nazi Party's "Brown Shirt" bully-boys and street brawlers that grew by 1934 into a paramilitary force of nearly a half-million men; after the purge of its leadership by the Schutzstaffel (SS) and Gestapo during the Night of the Long Knives rapidly decreased in numbers and influence.
- Sturmbann [plural: Sturmbanne] – lit. "storm banner," a battalion; used by SA and SS units until 1940.
- Sturmgeschütz (StuG) – self-propelled assault gun, such as the Sturmgeschütz III.
- Sturmgewehr – assault rifle.
- Sturmtrupp – assault troop, a specially drilled group of soldiers, usually a squad or a platoon, that was used for assaults on fixed positions in trenchwarfare. Later usage in WWII was for combat patrols with orders to infiltrate
- Sturmbattaillon – assault battalion, specially trained and equipped battalions of the German Army in WWI, specifically created in 1917 and 1918 from the experience in trench warfare.
- StuK – Sturmkanone, prefix for the main armament of any German self-propelled artillery, also "StuH" for Sturmhaubitze, when a howitzer was used instead on a tracked chassis.
- Stützpunkt – military war base.
- Süden – south.
- Swastika – English term for the German Hakenkreuz.
- sWS – Schwere Wehrmachtschlepper, late World War II "replacement" half-track vehicle.

=== T ===
- Tonne (t) – tonne (metric, 1000 kg)
- Tonne (ts) – long ton
- Tagesbefehl – order of the day
- tauchen – dive; submerge.
- Tauchpanzer – submersible tank.
- Teilkommando – a small, section-sized command group.
- Testflug – flight test, shakedown cruise
- Tiger – name given to the PzKW Panzer VI "Tiger I" and "Tiger II" series of tanks, as well as the Jagdtiger tank destroyer, based on the Tiger II, and Sturmtiger, built on the Tiger I's chassis.
- Todesmärsche – "Death marches" – at the end of the war when it became obvious that the German army was trapped between the Soviets to the east and the advancing Allied troops from the west, the Nazis, in an attempt to prevent the liberation of concentration camp inmates, forced them to march westward toward Germany proper. Thousands died in these marches.
- Tommy – German slang for a British soldier (similar to "Jerry" or "Kraut", the British and American slang terms for Germans).
- Totenkopf – "death's head", skull and crossbones, also the nickname for the Kampfgeschwader 54 bomber wing of the World War II era Luftwaffe.
- Tornister – Back pack
- Totenkopfverbände – "Death's Head units", employed as guards in Nazi concentration camps, many later became the members of units of the Waffen-SS, such as the SS Division Totenkopf.
- Totaler Krieg – "Total war" – In a total war, there is less differentiation between combatants and civilians than in other conflicts, and sometimes no such differentiation at all, as nearly every human resource, civilians and soldiers alike, can be considered to be part of the belligerent effort
- Totenkopfwachsturmbanne – Death's Head Guard battalions; units of the SS that guarded concentration camps during the war.
- Treffer – hit. Mostly in past tense. "Torpedo getroffen!" = "Torpedo hit!" or "Torpedo impact!"
- Trommelfeuer – High frequency artillery fire (Barage) causing sound of shell-explosions to merge into a rumble.
- Tropenhelm – pith helmet; a wide-rimmed fabric-covered cork helmet used in tropical areas, most notably by the Afrika Korps.
- Trupp (pl. Trupps) – Smallest tactical unit of 2 to 8 men, best comparing to Fireteam but also used in non-combat tasks as logistics.
- Truppe (pl. Truppen) – summarising term for armed forces, in some context it stands for the enlisted personnel.
- Truppenamt – "Troop Office", the disguised Army General Staff after the Versailles Treaty abolished the German Army General Staff.
- Truppenarzt – physician in units and sub-units with organic medical sections, e.g. Regimentsarzt, Bataillonsarzt
- Truppführer – team leader

=== U ===
- Ubootausbildungsabteilung (UAA) – see U-Fahrausbildungslehrgang.
- Uboot-Abnahme-Kommission (UAK) – submarine acceptance commission
- Ubootabwehrschule (UAS) – anti-submarine school
- U-Bootjäger (UJ-boats) – steam trawlers equipped for anti-submarine operations.
- U-Fahrausbildungslehrgang – where submarine personnel learned to operate U-boats.
- U-Lehrdivision (ULD) – U-boat Training Division (see Kommandanten-Schießlehrgang).
- unabkömmlich (uk) – not available for military service
- Uk (Schnellladekanone in Uboot-Lafette) – quick-firing gun with submarine mounting
- Untermenschen – those peoples the Nazis derided as "subhuman" (see Entmenscht).
- Unteroffizier – (1) a non-commissioned officer; (2) the lowest NCO rank, typical for e.g. infantry squad leaders and functionally equivalent to US Sergeant or UK Corporal.
- Unteroffiziere mit Portepee – senior NCO; lit. "underofficer with sword-knot."
- Unteroffiziere ohne Portepee – junior NCO; lit. "underofficer without sword-knot."
- Unterführer – summarized term for all non-commissioned officers; literally: "subleaders".
- Unterseeboot (U-Boot) – literally, "undersea boat"; submarine. In the English-speaking world, there is a distinction between "U-boat" and "submarine": "U-boat" refers to a German submarine, particularly the ones used during the world wars. In German, there is no distinction as "U-boat" is used for any submarine, such as "Deutsches U-Boot" or "Amerikanisches U-Boot".
- Ural bomber – Luftwaffe General Walter Wever's initiative to build Germany's first four engined strategic bomber at the dawn of the Third Reich, with prototypes coming from Dornier and Junkers. After Wever's death in 1936, the program was shelved.
- Urlaub – furlough; also: vacation.
- Utof (Uboots-Torpedoboots-Fliegerabwehr-Lafette) – quick-firing gun in submarine-torpedo boat-anti-aircraft mounting
- UvD – Unteroffizier vom Dienst – Sergeant in charge of quarters

=== V ===
- V1 – the first of the operational German "weapons of vengeance", or Vergeltungswaffen, the V1 was a pilotless, pioneering cruise missile powered by a pulse-jet engine and carried an 850 kg (1875 lb) high-explosive warhead. They had a range of up to 200 km. Nicknamed "buzz bombs" by Allied troops ("doodlebug" by Australians) due to the sound they made.
- V2 Rocket – Also known as the A4, the successor to the V1 was the pioneering supersonic SRBM powered by liquid oxygen and alcohol, it had a 975 kg (2150 lb) high-explosive warhead and a range of 320 km.
- V3 – long-range, smooth-bore multiple-chamber large-calibre gun nicknamed the Hochdruckpumpe (high-pressure pump), designed to fire shells carrying up to a 10 kg (22 lb) high-explosive warhead at a range of 93 km. It was never very successful as most installations were destroyed by bombing before they could be used.
- Verband – formation (from a battalion to a brigade).
- Verbindungsoffizier – liaison officer
- verdächtige Elemente/Personen – suspicious elements/persons.
- Verfügungstruppen – "[Special] Disposal Troops"; SS combat units, became the Waffen-SS in 1940.
- Vergeltungsmaßnahmen – reprisals; retaliatory punitive measures.
- Vernichtungskrieg – (1) "war of annihilation" against USSR civilians; (2) dogmatic offensive.
- Vernichtungslager – extermination camp.
- Verpflegung – food supplies
- Verräter – traitor.
- "Verstanden" – procedure word; "understood", "roger".
- Verstärkung – reinforcement.
- Versuchs – experimental. Hence the "V" designation for any military aircraft prototype for the World War II era Luftwaffe. Originated by the Fokker Flugzeugbau in 1916, solely for its own experimental designs.
- Versuchskonstruktion – prototype.
- Verwendung – duty position
- Veterinäroffizier – veterinarian officer
- Vichy France – French regime set up in the city of Vichy under Marshal Philippe Petain in collaboration with the Germans following the fall of France in 1940. It governed the southern half of France until its dissolution in 1944.
- Vierling – German for "quadruple", referring to any weapons mount that used four machine guns or autocannon of the same make and model, in a single traversable and elevatable mount, used as part of the name for the Flakvierling quadmount 20mm anti-aircraft cannon system, and the experimental HL 131V (Hecklafette 131-Vierling) tail turret, mounting four MG 131 12.7mm machine guns in an enclosed, powered defensive position for advanced German late-war bomber aircraft designs.
- Vizeadmiral – naval rank of vice admiral
- völkisch – popular, in the sense of "of the (German) populace." An adjective derived from "Volk" meaning "people," coming from the racist, nationalist ideology that divided people into "pure" Aryans and inferior Untermenschen.
- Volksdeutsche – ethnic Germans.
- Volksgemeinschaft – national community or civilian population; public support (see Kameradschaft).
- Volksgrenadier – "People's Infantryman", a morale-building honorific given to low-grade infantry divisions raised or reconstituted in the last months of the war.
- Volkskrieg – "People's War".
- Volkssturm – people's semi-military defense force, made up mostly of boys and older men.
- Volkstumskampf – ethnic struggle.
- Vorausabteilung – advance detachment
- Vorgeschobener Beobachter – forward observer
- Vorpostenboote (VP-boot) – coastal escort vessels and motor launches with anti-submarine and minesweeping gear. Also called Küstenfischkutter (KFK), as they were patrol vessels constructed to a fishing-vessel design.

=== W ===
- Wasserbombe (WaBo) – depth charge.
- Wach- – guard (in conjunction).
- Wachsamkeit – vigilance.
- Wachtmeister – senior NCO (equivalent to Feldwebel) in cavalry and artillery units.
- Waffe (plural: Waffen) – "weapon", or can be an adjective meaning "armed".
- Waffenamt – "weapons office" – arms inspection stamp or mark.
- Waffenfarbe – arm of service colour
- Waffen-SS – "Armed SS". The military combat branch of the SS that was created in August 1940 with the amalgamation of the Verfügungstruppe, the Leibstandarte SS Adolf Hitler (LSSAH) and the combat Standarten of the Totenkopfverbände.
- Wagen – vehicle, car.
- Wehrkraftzersetzung – undermining the fighting spirit of the troops.
- Wehrkreis – German military district centered on an important city.
- Wehrmacht – German armed forces under the Third Reich consisting of three branches: the Heer (Army), the Luftwaffe (Air Force), and the Kriegsmarine (Navy). The Waffen-SS was a separate organization, although SS combat units were usually placed under the operational control of Army High Command (OKH) or Wehrmacht High Command (OKW).
- Wehrmachtbericht – a daily radio broadcast that described the military situation on all fronts during World War II.
- Wehrmachtführungsstab – Armed Forces Operations Staff.
- Wehrmachtsadler – the Wehrmacht's eagle insignia.
- Wehrmachtgefolge – Armed Forces Auxiliaries. These include those organizations that were not a part of the armed forces but that served such an important support role that they were given protection under the Geneva Convention and/or militarized. The armed forces auxiliaries consisted in part of the Reichsarbeitsdienst, NSKK, Organisation Todt, and the Volkssturm, but also the Wehrmachthelferinnenkorps.
- Wehrmachtskanister – Robust tank used to carry fuel. Called a "Jerrycan" by the Allies.
- Wehrpass – German military individual service record booklet.
- Wehrpflichtiger – “Draftee”. A conscript soldier.
- Werkschutz – "factory guard" industrial plant protection service and security police.
- Werwolf – German guerrilla fighters dedicated to harass Allied rear areas. Initially conceived as an adjunct to the Jagd-Kommando units and placed under the command of Otto Skorzeny, the idea was later appropriated by Joseph Goebbels to represent the general rising up of the German people to defend against foreign invasion. It was not well organized or widely effective, and there were only a few known instances of involvement, mainly after the war ended and mostly in the eastern regions.
- Wespe – "wasp", a self-propelled 105mm howitzer on PzKpfw II chassis.
- Westen – west.
- Wetterbeobachtungsschiff (WBS) – weather ship
- Widerstandskräfte – insurgents (see Freischärler).
- Wolf – the military designation name for a Mercedes-Benz G-Class in the German Bundeswehr.
- Wolfsrudel – wolf pack, an anti-convoy tactic developed by Admiral Dönitz prior to the war.
- Wolfsschanze "Wolf's lair" lit. "Wolf's entrenchment" – Hitler's first World War II Eastern Front military headquarters, one of several Führer Headquarters or FHQs located in various parts of Europe. The complex buildings and shelters, built for Operation Barbarossa (the 1941 German invasion of the Soviet Union) was located in the Masurian woods, about 8 kilometres (5.0 mi) from Rastenburg, East Prussia (N/K/A Kętrzyn, Poland).
- Wotan – alternative name for the Y-Gerät radio navigation system.
- Würzburg radar – German air defense radar that went into service in 1940; over 3,000 of all variants were built.

=== X ===
- X-Gerät – "X-device" or "X-equipment"; radio navigation equipment used on German aircraft.

=== Y ===
- Y-Beam – German aircraft navigational system that utilized a single station that radiated a directional beam plus a ranging signal that the bomber picked up and re-transmitted to enable the ground controllers to compute the range and know when to order the bombs to be dropped.
- Y-Gerät – "Y-device" or "Y-equipment"; radio navigation equipment used on German aircraft.

=== Z ===
- Z-Plan (or Plan-Z) was the name given to the re-equipment and expansion of the Kriegsmarine (Nazi German Navy) as ordered by Adolf Hitler on 27 January 1939. The plan called for 10 battleships, four aircraft carriers, three battlecruisers, eight heavy cruisers, 44 light cruisers, 68 destroyers and 249 U-boats by 1944 that was meant to challenge the naval power of the United Kingdom. The outbreak of World War II in September 1939 came far too early to implement the plan.
- Z3 – pioneering computer developed by Konrad Zuse in 1941, it was destroyed by bombardment in 1944.
- z.b.V. – see zur besonderen Verwendung.
- Zeit – time.
- Zeitplan – timetable, schedule.
- Zeltbahn – a triangular or square shelter quarter made of closely woven, water-repellent cotton duck. It could be used on its own as a poncho or put together with others to create shelters and tents. Also called Zeltplane.
- Zentralstelle II P – Central Office II P (Poland).
- Zerstörer – destroyer, also the designation for a Luftwaffe heavy fighter combat aircraft.
- Ziel – target, objective.
- Zimmerit – an anti-magnetic mine paste applied on the armour of German tanks to prevent magnetic mines from being attached. It was similar to cement, and was applied on the tanks with a rake, giving the vehicle a rough appearance. From the summer of the 1943 to mid-1944 Zimmerit became a standard characteristic on many German panzers.
- Zollgrenzschutz – (ZGS) Customs Border Guards.
- Zossen – The underground bunker complex that was headquarters for both the Wehrmacht (OKW) and (Heer) Army High Command (OKH) located approximately 20 miles west of Berlin in Zossen, Germany.
- Zug – platoon or train.
- Zugführer – platoon leader
- Zugtruppführer – platoon HQ section leader
- Zur besonderen Verwendung (z.b.V.) – for special employment. Sometimes a killing squad/unit, but also used for divisions raised for special reasons (e.g., the Division zbV Afrika).
- Zyklon-B – commercial name for the prussic acid (hydrocyanic acid) gas used in German extermination camps.

== List of German military ranks ==
Approximate ranks relative to US ranks:

- Reichsmarschall – "Marshal of the Empire", the highest rank in the German armed forces during World War II (specifically created for Hermann Göring to distinguish him from the other field marshals). Equivalent to General of the Armies of the United States
- Generalfeldmarschall – General of the Army during World War II.
- Generaloberst – general, literally "highest" or "supreme general", usually translated "colonel-general"; not used in the Bundeswehr
- General der Infanterie, Kavallerie, etc. – general (before 1956 equivalent to US lieutenant general)
- Generalleutnant – lieutenant-general (before 1956 equivalent to US major general)
- Generalmajor – major-general (before 1956 equivalent to US brigadier general)
- Brigadegeneral – brigadier general; not used prior to the Bundeswehr
- Oberst – colonel, literally "highest"
- Oberstleutnant – lieutenant colonel
- Major – major
- Hauptmann/Rittmeister – captain
- Oberleutnant – first lieutenant
- Leutnant – (second) lieutenant
- Oberstabsfeldwebel/Oberstabsbootsmann – (senior NCO)
- Stabsfeldwebel/Hauptbootsmann – master sergeant (senior NCO)
- Oberfeldwebel/Bootsmannsmaat – technical sergeant (senior NCO)
- Fähnrich/Oberfähnrich – no perfect equivalent. Senior officer cadet with something like warrant officer status, used in functions like ensign, passed midshipman or 2nd lieutenant but not commissioned.
- Fahnenjunker – no perfect equivalent. Most junior officer cadet with sergeant (US) or corporal (UK) status.
- Feldwebel/Wachtmeister/Bootsmann – staff sergeant (senior NCO)
- Unterfeldwebel – sergeant; formerly called sergeant prior to 1921 (not in use in the Bundeswehr)
- Stabsunteroffizer/Obermaat (junior NCO)
- Unteroffizier/Maat – corporal (junior NCO) (since the Bundeswehr more comparable to petty officer)
- Oberstabsgefreiter – (enlisted personnel); used in the Kriegsmarine (1935-1945) as Matrosenoberstabsgefreiter; not used prior to the Bundeswehr for the Army (Heer).
- Stabsgefreiter – (enlisted personnel)
- Hauptgefreiter – (enlisted personnel); not used prior to the Bundeswehr.
- Obergefreiter – lance corporal (enlisted personnel). Historically, and up until 1945, the rank of Obergefreiter was considered in English the equivalent to a British Army lance corporal with seniority, therefore named "senior lance corporal", or rather second corporal in the artillery.
- Gefreiter – private first class (enlisted personnel). Historically, and up until 1945, the rank of Gefreiter was considered in English the equivalent to a British Army lance corporal rank.
- Oberschütze – Senior Rifleman. Historical rank used up until 1945, not in use in the Bundeswehr.
- Gemeiner – private (enlisted personnel). Historically, and up until 1918, the rank of Gemeiner was ordinarily used for an enlisted soldier of private rank.
- Grenadier/Schütze/Soldat/Matrose/Flieger/Sanitäter – private (enlisted personnel)

For additional comparisons, see Comparative military ranks of World War II.

== List of military operations ==
The German term for "Operation" is Unternehmen, literally "undertaking".

- Adlerangriffe (Eagle Attack) series of raids against Royal Air Force (RAF).
- Adlertag – Eagle Day; day one of intense raiding against RAF 13 August 1940 known as Operation Eagle Attack (postponed from 10 August).
- Anton – occupation of Vichy France, November 1942; later known as Atilla.
- Atilla – occupation of Vichy France, November 1942 (previously, Anton).
- Aufbau Ost – Eastern Buildup; build-up of arms prior to the invasion of the Soviet Union.
- Barbarossa – invasion of the Soviet Union in June 1941. Barbarossa, or "Red Beard" was the nickname for Emperor Frederick I, who attempted to unify Germanic states in the 12th century.
- Bernhard – scheme to counterfeit British bank notes and put them into circulation; begun in 1942.
- Bodenplatte – Base Plate; air offensive against Allied airfields in north-western Europe, New Year's Day 1945.
- Eiche – Oak; mission to rescue Benito Mussolini by Fallschirmjäger led by Skorzeny.
- Eisenhammer – Iron Hammer, planned strategic bombing raid on Soviet electric power generation water turbines, potentially knocking out three-quarters of all western Soviet electrical generation capacity, never carried out
- Fall Blau – Case Blue; summer offensive in Southern Russia.
- Fall Gelb – Case Yellow; invasion of the Netherlands, Belgium and France.
- Fall Grün – Case Green; intended invasion of Czechoslovakia.
- Fall Rot – Case Red; counterstrike against France in the event of an attack from the West.
- Fall Weiß – Case White; invasion of Poland.
- Felix – plan to capture Gibraltar in 1941. It never took place.
- Fischfang – Fish Trap; counterattack on the Allied beachhead at Anzio in February 1944.
- Greif – Griffin; dropping of English-speaking troops wearing American uniforms behind the Allied lines in the Ardennes, prior to the Battle of the Bulge.
- Herbstnebel – Autumn Mist; offensive in the Ardennes, December 1944. Better known as the Battle of the Ardennes.
- Herkules – projected invasion of Malta by Fallschirmjäger and the navy. Never executed.
- Kathrin – plan to help the Irish Republican Army to commit terrorism and disrupt British internal security.
- Merkur – Mercury (the planet or the Roman god, not the metal); airborne invasion of Crete 1941.
- Nordlicht – Northern Lights; attack on Leningrad in 1942.
- Nordwind – North Wind; counteroffensive in Alsace and Lorraine in January 1945.
- Panzerfaust – Armored Fist; the October 1944 mission to kidnap Miklós Horthy Jr, son of Hungarian Regent Admiral Miklós Horthy.
- Paukenschlag – Drumroll or Drumbeat; offensive against Allied shipping in US and Caribbean waters in the first half of 1942.
- Pastorius – U-boat operation involving U-202 and U-548 setting 8 agents ashore in the US in June 1942.
- Reinhard – covername for the entire process of building extermination camps, deportation of Jews first to ghettos, then to the concentration camps for extermination and incineration. Named for SD chief Reinhard Heydrich.
- Seelöwe – Sea Lion; projected amphibious assault on Great Britain in 1940/41. It never took place.
- Steinbock – the German Luftwaffe bomber offensive against England from late January through the end of May 1944
- Stösser – parachute drop on evening of 16 December 1944; purpose was to seize a crossroads for Kampfgruppe Peiper during the Germans' Ardennes Offensive.
- Strafgericht – "punishment" air attacks on Belgrade, April 1941.
- Taifun – Typhoon; push towards Moscow in September 1941.
- Tannenbaum – "fir-tree"; projected invasion of Switzerland in 1940. Never carried out.
- Tiger – advance through the Maginot Line on the French border in June 1940.
- Wacht am Rhein – "Guard on the Rhine"; the December 1944 Ardennes offensive, known by Americans as the Battle of the Bulge.
- Walküre – Valkyrie Officially a Reserve Army contingency plan to restore law and order in the event a disruption caused by the Allied bombing of German cities caused a breakdown in law and order, or a rising by the millions of forced laborers German factories. Was, in fact, a major part of the failed July 20 Plot to arrest SS and other Nazi officials and seize control of the German government.
- Weserübung – Weser Exercise (commonly, Water Exercise); invasion of Denmark and Norway, 9 April 1940
- Wintergewitter – Winter Gale; unsuccessful attempt to relieve the 6th Army at Stalingrad in December 1942.
- Zitadelle – Citadel; attack on Soviet salient at Kursk, July 1943.

== See also ==
- Glossary of Nazi Germany
- Weimar paramilitary groups
- Ranks and Insignia of the German Army in World War II
- Ranks and insignia of the Schutzstaffel
- Comparative military ranks of World War II
- List of SS personnel

== General references ==
- Andrew, Stephen; Thomas, Nigel; The German Army 1939–45: Blitzkrieg. Osprey Publishing Lt., 1999.
- Bidermann, Gottlob Herbert. In Deadly Combat: A German Soldier's Memoir of the Eastern Front. Kansas, University Press of Kansas. (2001): ISBN 0-7006-1122-3.
- Niehorster, Leo (31 January 2015). "German Army. Military Personnel Job Descriptions". World War II Armed Forces. Orders of Battle and Organizations.
- Rottman, Gordon L. "FUBAR: Soldier Slang of World War II". London, Osprey Publishing. (2007): ISBN 978-1-84603-175-5. (Contains German slang chapter.)
- Shirer, William; The Rise and Fall of the Third Reich. Simon & Schuster. (1990): ISBN 0-671-72868-7.
- Snyder, Louis L. Encyclopedia of the Third Reich. London: Robert Hale, 1976. ISBN 978-0-73942-360-8
- Zentner, Christian and Friedemann Bedürftig (1991). The Encyclopedia of the Third Reich. Macmillan, New York. ISBN 0-02-897502-2
