= End of day =

End of trading day in financial markets

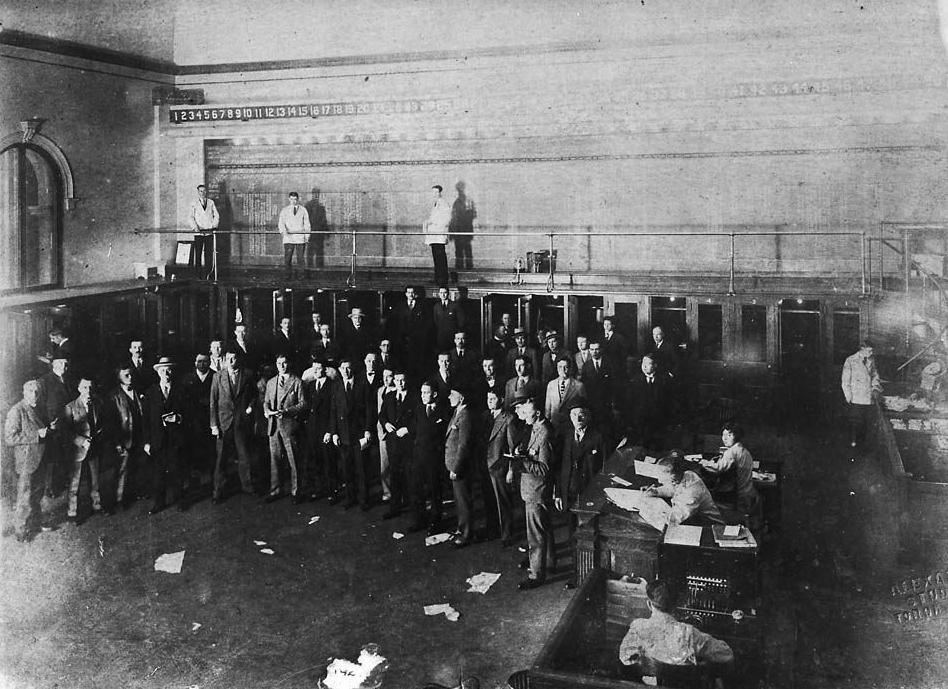
Traders at the Toronto Stock Exchange, c. 1935 pose for a photograph at end of day. Note the discarded papers on the floor.

End of day (EOD), end of business (EOB), close of business (COB), close of play (COP), or end of play (EOP) is the end of the trading day in financial markets, the point when trading ceases. In some markets it is actually defined as the point in time a few minutes prior to the actual cessation of trading, when the regular traders' orders are no longer received.

During this period, the market is performing what is called a "Run To Cash", which is when the market is reconciling to its underlying cash market. EOB, COB and COP in the U.S. is usually at 4:00 pm (16:00). In the United Kingdom, these terms typically refer to 17:30, while EOD is 23:59.

== United States military ==
In the United States military, end of day or close of business is the time when all scheduled training and administrative work stops. The unit's senior noncommissioned officer may hold a formation at this time. During this formation, guidance is given to the enlisted members, the unit commander may publish information and the unit is given the command to fall out, which usually means done for the day. However, some members of the units, especially maintenance crews and those on charge of quarters duty, may continue working.

== See also ==
- Time horizon
