= Polizei =

Polizei is the German word for police. Police in Germany, Austria and Switzerland consist of different agencies. It might refer to:

== National agencies ==
- Bundespolizei (Germany), Federal Police of Germany
- Bundespolizei (Austria), Federal Police of Austria
- Bundeskriminalamt (Germany), Federal Criminal Office of Germany, comparable to the FBI
- Bundeskriminalamt (Austria), Federal Investigation Bureau of Austria
- Polizei beim Deutschen Bundestag, the German Parliament Police

== State agencies ==
- Landespolizei, state police of Germany
- Landeskriminalamt, an independent agency in most German states that is subordinate to the state ministry of the interior

== Police units ==
- Autobahnpolizei, highway police
- Bahnpolizei, railway police
- Bereitschaftspolizei, police support group and riot police of Germany
- Kriminalpolizei, criminal Investigation Police in Germany, Austria and Switzerland; similar to the British Criminal Investigation Department
- Schutzpolizei, a branch of the Landespolizei, the state (land) level police of the German states
- Spezialeinsatzkommando, specialized operation armed response units of the sixteen German state police forces
- Wasserschutzpolizei, water police that patrols the waterways, lakes and harbours of Germany

== Defunct agencies ==
- Volkspolizei, the People's Police in the German Democratic Republic (East Germany)
- Transportpolizei, the transit police in the German Democratic Republic (East Germany)
- Polizei der Freien Stadt Danzig, state constabulary of the Free City of Danzig, including the Sicherheitspolizei (1919-1921) and the Schutzpolizei (1921-1945)
- Ordnungspolizei, regular Police forces of Nazi Germany
  - 4th SS Polizei Panzergrenadier Division, SS unit formed by Ordnungspolizei members
  - Hilfspolizei, various auxiliary organizations subordinated to the Ordnungspolizei as well as various military and paramilitary units set up during World War II in German-occupied Europe.
- Sicherheitspolizei, secret police in Germany until the outbreak of World War II
- Gestapo (Geheime Staatspolizei), secret police of the Nazi regime
- Geheime Feldpolizei, secret military police of Nazi Germany
- Preußische Geheimpolizei, the Prussian Secret Police
