= Charge of Quarters =

CQ or charge of quarters is a tasked duty in which a United States armed forces service member guards the front entrance to the barracks. Historically a non-commissioned officer (NCO) in charge of quarters was responsible for all matters within the barracks, including "enforcing quiet and orderly conduct and correct behavior on the part of other men".

== Modern requirements ==
Typically two service members, one a non-commissioned officer (NCO) and the other a junior enlisted service member, sit at a desk to monitor incoming and outgoing traffic into the barracks. There are usually additional duties, such as sweeping the entryway, cleaning the entrance restrooms, and checking the barracks laundry room for laundry left overnight.

Other duties may include performing radio checks every few hours with other company barracks and battalion headquarters around the base or surrounding installations as well as bed checks to ensure service members are in their rooms with their doors locked by curfew. For example, some U.S. Armed Forces service members stationed in South Korea have a curfew for being on post, and another one for being in their own individual rooms with their doors locked.

Weekend shifts usually start at 0700 hours (7:00 a.m.), depending on the military branch and installation, and go for 24 hours. During the work week, the duty starts at between 1600 and 1630 hours (4:00 p.m. and 4:30 p.m.), also known as Close of Business (COB). Service members are typically excused from duties the following day after being relieved by a senior NCO, in most cases the unit's first sergeant.
