= Wehrmachthelferinnenkorps =

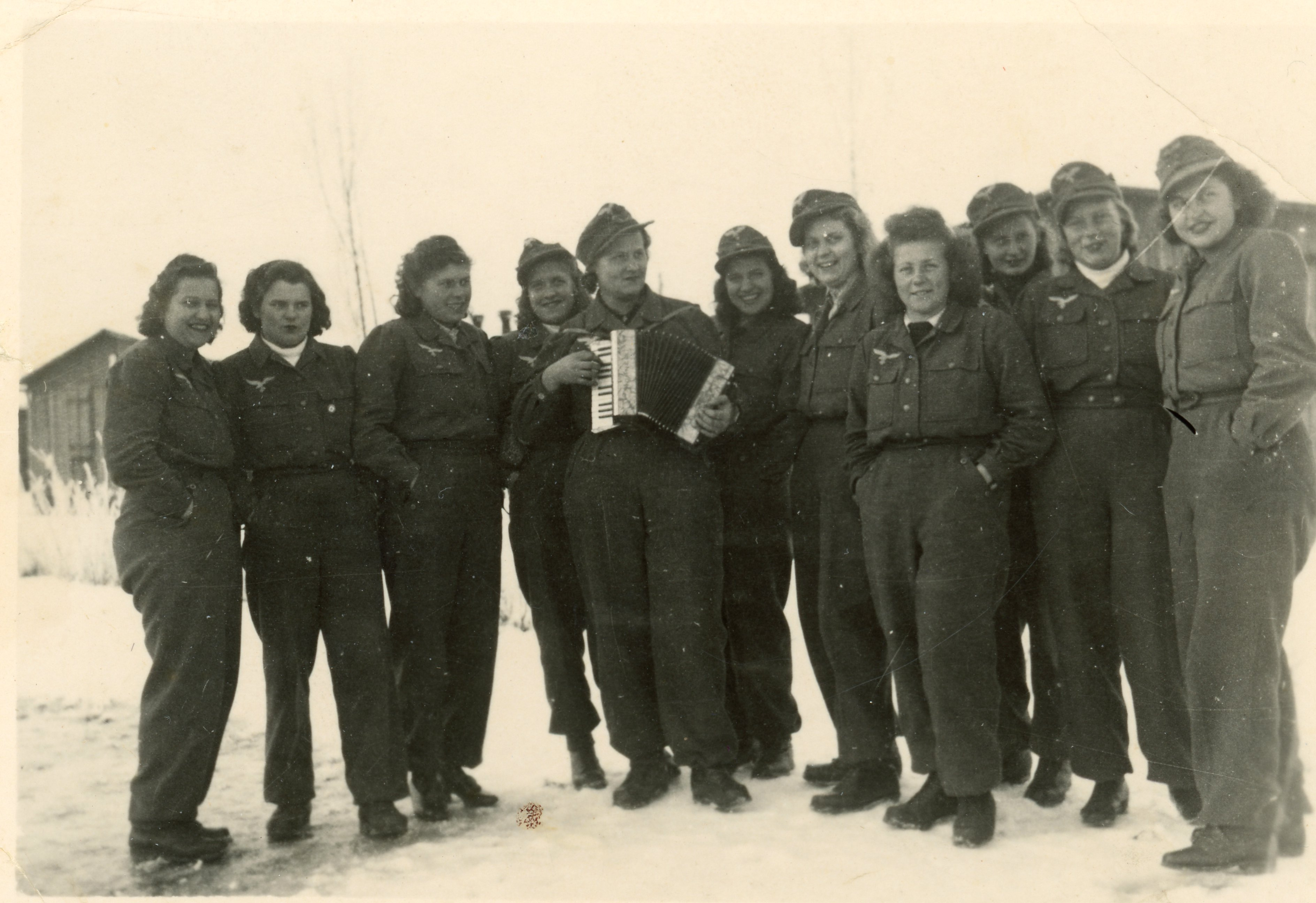
Wehrmacht female auxiliaries in Flak-service, 1945.

The Wehrmachthelferinnenkorps ('Armed Forces female helper corps') was created on 29 November 1944 when all German military female auxiliary organizations, except the Civil defence air-raid warning service female auxiliaries, were merged into one corps, the Wehrmacht Female Auxiliary Corps.

== Background ==
Through the framework of the total war-policy, able bodied male soldiers were as much as possible to be replaced by female auxiliaries. The service in the new corps was declared to be a special honorable service for German women at war.

== Scope ==
Preferably younger women from the age of 18 would be called up for long-term emergency service. Recruitment would in the first hand be based on volunteer enlistment. In the second hand, women made available by the Commissioner for total war, would be drafted. If that draft did not supply enough auxiliaries, women already employed by the party, government, military or private business would be drafted. Women specially trained for war-critical functions should only be drafted as a last resort. The female auxiliaries belonged to the Wehrmachtgefolge or auxiliaries of the armed forces. If uniformed they would wear the uniform of the branch they were serving in. Auxiliaries were subordinated to the Wehrmacht, both during and outside service. Members of the female Red Cross in civilian labor deployment would be transferred to the new corps. Female members of the Reichsarbeitsdienst (RAD) would remain in the RAD until they had fulfilled their labor service duty. ¨

== Disbandment ==
An order from the Oberkommando der Wehrmacht of April 6, 1945, demobilized all women whose homes were not already in allied occupied territory. They left their uniforms and were given three months severance pay.

== Ranks and rank insignia ==
Insignia										No insignia
Insignia	Oberstabsführerin	Stabsführerin	Hauptdienstführerin	Oberdienstführerin	Dienstführerin	Obertruppführerin	Truppführerin	Haupthelferin	Oberhelferin	Helferin
