= Junkers Ju 390 =

German prototype long-range aircraft of WW2

Ju 390
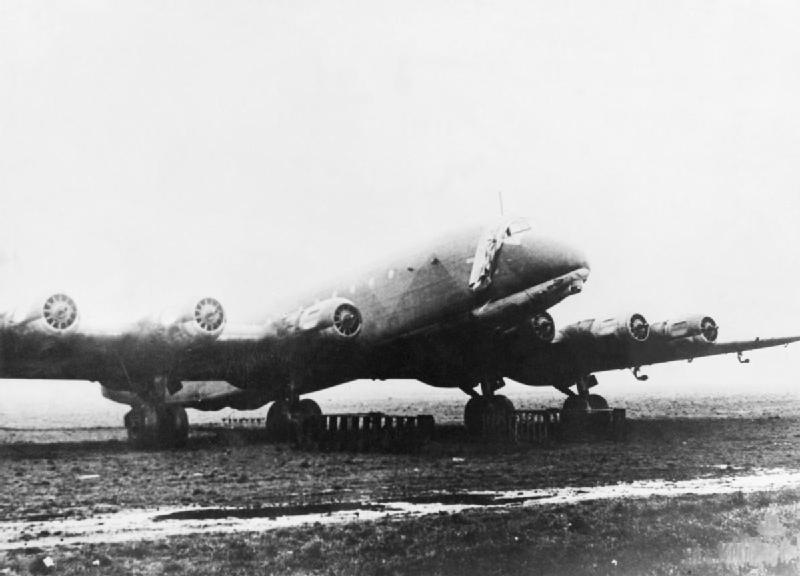
- Abandoned Junkers Ju 390

General information
- Type: Long-range transport/maritime patrol/bomber
- Manufacturer: Junkers
- Primary user: Luftwaffe
- Number built: 2 (V2 never flew)

History
- Introduction date: 1943
- First flight: 20 October 1943
- Retired: 1945
- Developed from: Junkers Ju 290

The Junkers Ju 390 was a German long-range derivative of the Junkers Ju 290 aircraft, intended to be used as a heavy transport aircraft, maritime patrol aircraft and long-range bomber. It was one of the aircraft designs submitted for the abortive Amerikabomber project, along with the Messerschmitt Me 264, the Focke-Wulf Ta 400 and the Heinkel He 277.

== Design and development ==
Two prototypes were created by attaching an extra pair of inner-wing segments to the wings of Ju 290 airframes and adding new sections to lengthen the fuselages. The first prototype, V1 (bearing Stammkennzeichen code of GH+UK), was modified from the Ju 90 V6 airframe (Werknummer J4918, civil registration D-AOKD from July 1940 to April 1941, then to the Luftwaffe as KH+XC from April 1941 to April 1942, then returned to Junkers and used for Ju 390 V1 construction). It made its maiden flight on 20 October 1943 and performed well, resulting in an order in early 1944 for six more prototypes (Ju 390 V2 to V7) and 20 examples of the intended production version. to be named Ju 390 A-1. None of these had been built by the time that the project was cancelled (along with Ju 290 production) in mid-1944.

== Operational history ==
The Ju 390 V1 was constructed and largely assembled at Junkers' plant at Dessau in Germany and the first test flight took place on 20 October 1943. This was done by adding an additional wing section and engines and adding a fuselage section immediately aft of the wings to increase the length to 31 m (102 ft). Its performance was satisfactory enough that the Air Ministry ordered six additional prototypes (Ju 390 V2 to V7) and 20 examples of the intended Ju 390A-1 production version. On 29 June 1944, the Luftwaffe Quartermaster General noted that the RLM paid Junkers to complete the first seven Ju 390 prototypes. The contracts for the Ju 390 V2 to V7 and production aircraft were cancelled on 20 June 1944 and all work ceased in September 1944, and the Ju 390 V2 would never be built. On 26 November 1943, the Ju 390 V1—with many other new aircraft and prototypes—was shown to Adolf Hitler at Insterburg, East Prussia. According to the logbook of former Junkers test pilot Hans-Joachim Pancherz, the Ju 390 V1 was brought to Prague immediately after it had been displayed at Insterburg and took part in a number of test flights, which continued until March 1944, including tests of aerial refueling. The Ju 390 V1 was returned to Dessau in November 1944, where it was stripped of parts and finally destroyed in late April 1945 as the US Army approached.

The Ju 390A-1 would have had a fuselage 2.5 m (8.2 ft) longer than that of the Ju 390 V1 for a total of length of 33.5 m (110 ft) and it was to be equipped with FuG 200 Hohentwiel ASV (Air to Surface Vessel) radar and defensive armament consisting of five 20 mm MG 151/20 cannon. Green (1970) wrote that the armament was four 20 mm MG 151/20s and three 13 mm (.51 in) MG 131 machine guns. At a hearing before British authorities on 26 September 1945, Professor Heinrich Hertel, chief designer and technical director of Junkers Aircraft & Motor Works, asserted the Ju 390 V2 had never been completed. German author Friedrich Georg claimed in his book that test pilot Oberleutnant Joachim Eisermann flew the Ju 390 V2 on 9 February 1945 at Rechlin Air Base. The log is said to have recorded a handling flight lasting 50 minutes and composed of circuits around Rechlin, and that a second 20-minute flight was used to ferry the prototype to Lärz. Kay (2004) stated that the second Ju 390 prototype was discarded without being flown because of a July 1944 RLM decree sanctioning an end to all large combat plane programs in Nazi Germany in favor of the Emergency Fighter Program. Pancherz stated in 1980 that only the first Ju 390 flew and cast doubt on all claims of the Ju 390 making a test flight to the vicinity of New York City.

== Alleged flights ==
=== South Africa flight ===
A speculative article in The Daily Telegraph British newspaper in 1969 titled "Lone Bomber Raid on New York Planned by Hitler", in which Hans Pancherz reportedly claimed to have made a test flight from Germany to Cape Town in early 1944. Author James P. Duffy has carried out extensive research into this claim, which has proved fruitless.

=== New York flight ===
A letter published in the 11 November 1955 issue of the British magazine RAF Flying Review (of which aviation writer William Green was an editor) claimed that two Ju 390s had made a flight to America, including a one-hour stay over New York City. The magazine's editors were skeptical of the claim. In March 1956, the Review published a letter from an RAF officer which claimed to clarify the account. According to Green's reporting, in June 1944, Allied Intelligence had learned from prisoner interrogations that a Ju 390 had been delivered in January 1944 to Fernaufklärungsgruppe 5, based at Mont-de-Marsan near Bordeaux and that it had completed a 32-hour reconnaissance flight to within 19 km (12 mi) of the U.S. coast, north of New York City. This was rejected just after the war by British authorities. Aviation historian Dr. Kenneth P. Werrell states that the story of the flight originated in General Report on Aircraft Engines and Aircraft Equipment, two British intelligence reports from August 1944, which were based in part on the interrogation of prisoners. The reports claimed that the Ju 390 had taken photographs of the coast of Long Island but no photos or other evidence for the existence of such photos has been found.

The claimed flight was mentioned in many books following the RAF Flying Review account, including Green's respected Warplanes of the Second World War (1968) and Warplanes of the Third Reich (1970) but without ever citing sources. Further authors then cited Green's books as their source for the claimed flight. Werrell told Duffy that Green had said many years later that he no longer placed "much credence" in the flight. Werrell later examined the data regarding the range of the Ju 390 and concluded that although a great circle round trip from France to St. John's, Newfoundland was possible, adding another 3,830 km (2,380 mi) for a round trip from St. John's to Long Island made the flight "most unlikely".

Karl Kössler and Günter Ott, in their book Die großen Dessauer: Junkers Ju 89, 90, 290, 390. Die Geschichte einer Flugzeugfamilie (The Big Dessauers... History of an Aircraft Family) also examined the claimed flight and debunked the flight north of New York. Assuming there was only one aircraft in existence, Kössler and Ott note it was nowhere near France at the time when the flight was supposed to have taken place. They also assert that the Ju 390 V1 was unlikely to have been capable of taking off with the fuel load necessary for such a long flight due to concerns about the strength of its structure; it would have required a takeoff weight of 65 t (72 short tons), while the maximum takeoff weight during its trials had been 34 t (37 short tons) though prototypes are never flown at maximum gross weight until testing can determine the aircraft's handling. According to Kössler and Ott, the Ju 390 V2 could not have made the flight since it was not completed before September/October 1944.

=== Japan flight ===
In his book The Bunker, author James P. O'Donnell mentions a flight to Japan. O'Donnell claimed that Albert Speer, in an early 1970s telephone interview, stated that there had been a secret Ju 390 flight to Japan "late in the war". The flight, by a Luftwaffe test pilot, had supposedly been non-stop via the polar route. O'Donnell is the sole source for the story; Speer never mentioned the story in any of his writings or other interviews. Kössler and Ott make no mention of the claim.

== Variants ==
Ju 390 V1

First prototype.

Ju 390 V2 to V7

Second to seventh prototypes, none completed.

Ju 390 A-1

Planned production version for long-range heavy bomber, heavy transport, maritime patrol roles.

== Operators ==
Germany

- Luftwaffe

Some sources claim that a Ju 390 was assigned to Fernaufklärungsgruppe 5. Kössler and Ott state that it was not.

== Specifications (Ju 390 A-1) ==
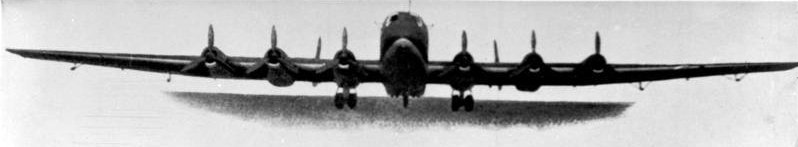

Data from The warplanes of the Third Reich

General characteristics

- Crew: 10
- Capacity: 10,000 kg (22,046 lb) typical freighter payload
- Length: 34.201 m (112 ft 2.5 in)
- Wingspan: 50.32 m (165 ft 1 in)
- Height: 6.88 m (22 ft 7 in)
- Wing area: 253.600 m^{2} (2,729.73 sq ft)
- Empty weight: 36,900 kg (81,350 lb)
- Max takeoff weight: 75,500 kg (166,450 lb)
- Fuel capacity: 34,096 L (9,007 US gal; 7,500 imp gal)
- Powerplant: 6 × BMW 801E 14-cylinder two-row air-cooled radial piston engines, 1,470 kW (1,970 hp) each for take-off

1,300 kW (1,740 hp) at 1,970 m (6,450 ft)
1,090 kW (1,460 hp) at 6,200 m (20,340 ft)

- Propellers: 3-bladed VDM constant-speed propellers

Performance

- Maximum speed: 505 km/h (314 mph, 273 kn) at 6,200 m (20,340 ft)
- Cruise speed: 357 km/h (222 mph, 193 kn) at 2,500 m (8,200 ft)
- Range: 8,000 km (4,970 mi, 4,320 nmi) Ju 390 V1 with 10,000 kg (22,046 lb) payload and 34,096 L (9,007 US gal; 7,500 imp gal) fuel at 330 km/h (210 mph; 180 kn) and 2,000 m (6,500 ft)
- Combat range: 9,704 km (6,030 mi, 5,240 nmi) (reconnaissance mission)
- Combat range (bomber mission): 9,254 km (5,750 mi; 4,997 nmi) with 1,930 kg (4,255 lb) bomb load

Armament

- Guns: (proposed)
  - 2 × 20 mm MG 151/20 cannon in dorsal turrets
  - 1 × 20 mm MG 151/20 in tail
  - 2 × 13 mm (.51 in) MG 131 machine guns at waist
  - 2 × 13 mm (.51 in) MG 131s in gondola
  - Proposed fitment of a pair of 4 × MG 131 Hecklafette HL 131V quadmount manned turrets, one in tail and one in nose.
- Hardpoints: 4 with a capacity of 3,968 lb (1,800 kg) each
- Missiles: 4 × Henschel Hs 293 or

4 × Henschel Hs 294 or
4 × FX 1400 Fritz-X

== See also ==
Related development

- Junkers Ju 89
- Junkers Ju 90
- Junkers Ju 290

Aircraft of comparable role, configuration, and era

- Boeing B-29 Superfortress
- Focke-Wulf Ta 400
- Heinkel He 277
- Messerschmitt Me 264
- Nakajima G8N
- Nakajima G10N Fugaku
- Project Z in Japan

Related lists

- List of bomber aircraft
- List of German aircraft projects, 1939–1945
- List of military aircraft of Germany
- List of World War II military aircraft of Germany
