= Victory Bomber =

Proposed WWII British strategic bomber

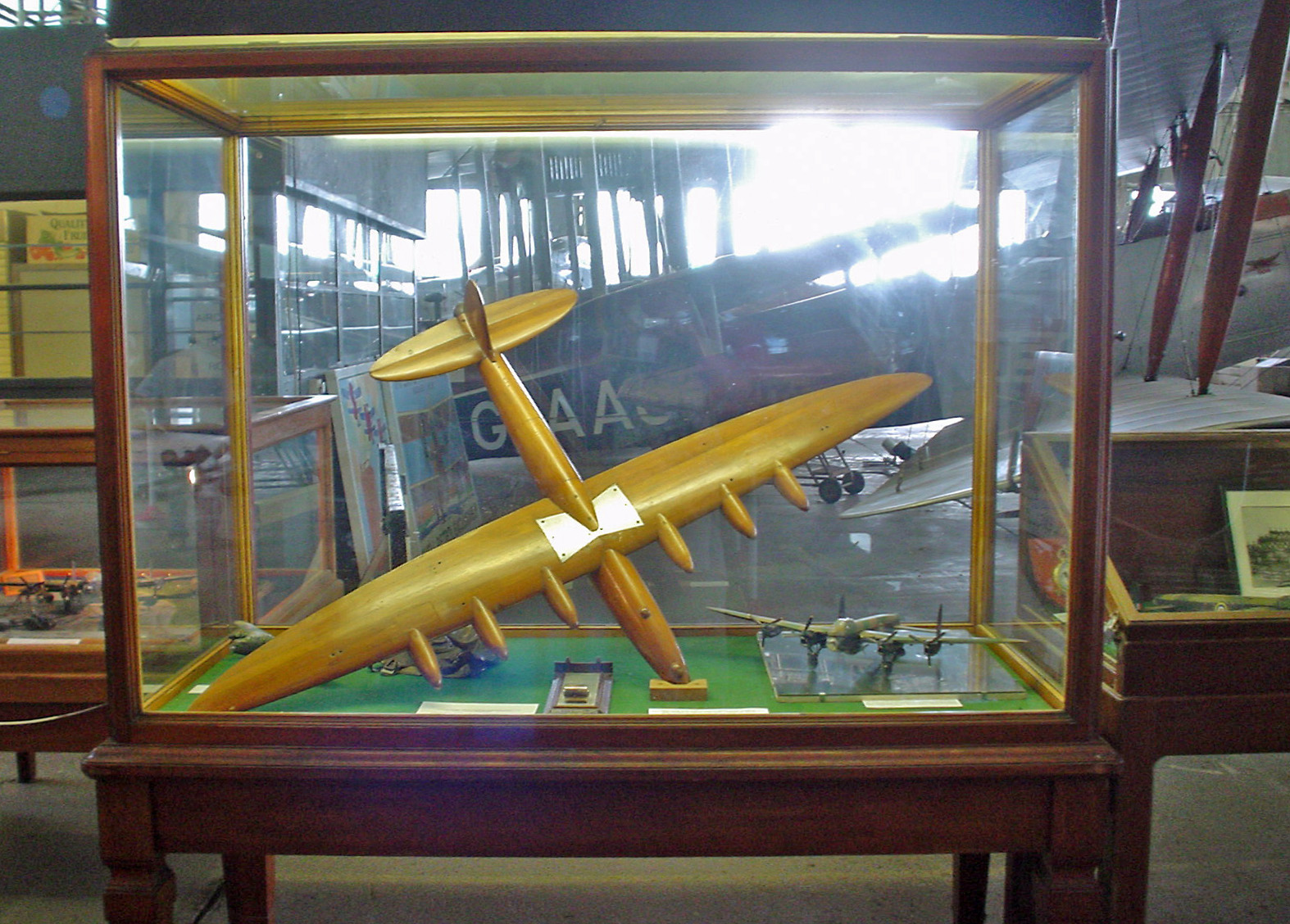
Wind tunnel model of the Victory Bomber at the Brooklands Museum

The British "Victory Bomber" was a Second World War design proposal by British inventor and aircraft designer Barnes Wallis while at Vickers-Armstrongs for a large strategic bomber. This aircraft was to have performed what Wallis referred to as "anti-civil engineering" bombing missions on targets in Nazi Germany.

Wallis had developed the concept of an "earthquake bomb" that would destroy its targets by exploding beneath them, destroying their foundations and causing them to fall into the resulting cavern. To make this effective, the bomb had to be 22,000 lb (10,000 kg) and dropped from an altitude of 40,000 feet (12 km). There was no aircraft able to lift such a weapon, or operate effectively at those altitudes.

Wallis designed the six-engine Victory Bomber to perform this mission. At the time, Royal Air Force (RAF) bombers were much smaller and had only two engines. The project was studied in detail, the bomber proceeding to wind tunnel testing while the earthquake bomb to equip it was tested on representative models. The Air Ministry chose not to proceed with development of the Victory Bomber, terminating it in May 1941 before prototypes were built.

The Avro Lancaster was later adapted to carry large bombs to carry out similar missions. The Lancaster used Wallis' Tallboy, Grand Slam and bouncing bomb during strategic "anti-civil engineering" missions, such as Operation Chastise, the "Dambusters" mission.

== Background ==
During the early stages of the Second World War, Wallis performed extensive studies of the German war economy and industry, concluding that with the selective destruction of strategic infrastructure targets, the German capacity to produce armaments could be reduced. Wallis believed that a fundamental means to ending the war would be to send bombing missions against German power sources and that the destruction of facilities such as coal mines, oil depots, hydroelectric dams and water supplies would leave Germany without a functional war industry and therefore having no ability to wage war.

Wallis also spent a considerable amount of time studying the physics involved in high explosives and various bombs. As a result of these studies, Wallis conceived of more effective means to use explosives; that the shock wave that was created when munitions such as depth charges were detonated was more damaging than the initial blast of the detonation itself; he also viewed conventional bombing methods as practised by RAF Bomber Command to be insufficient on these terms to attack dispersed industrial areas. On this basis, he sought to apply this principle to a new type of weapon that would detonate underground. In 1940, Wallis designed a 22,400 lb (10,200 kg) "penetrating" bomb that was to bury itself in the ground before detonating. Designed with a sharp, pointed nose, the bomb could be dropped from a high altitude of 40,000 ft (12,000 m) and would plunge around 135 ft (41 m) underground; the explosion would cause a miniature concentrated 'earthquake' with a destructive radius of 29 acres. It was estimated that this bomb could be capable of breaking dams such as the Möhne if it were to explode while in the reservoirs within 150 ft (46 m) of the dam's face.

Wallis argued that roughly 4,000 acres (16 km^{2}) could be thoroughly destroyed by five aircraft each deploying only a single such bomb; this would allow for far greater levels of destruction by RAF Bomber Command as it required substantially fewer bombers to create the same levels of damage as via contemporary means. Only a small number of such equipped bombers was reasoned to be able to devastate Germany's industrial capacity to a greater extent than mass waves of conventionally-armed bombers. Wallis allegedly said that "irreparable damage could be inflicted on the strategic communications of the German Empire by ... ten or twenty machines within the course of a few weeks". However, the deployment of Wallis' concept was not immediately possible, for there was no existing Royal Air Force (RAF) bomber that would be capable of carrying such a weapon.

The limitation of the purpose of the Victory Bomber to only a single bomb and mission did not endear it to the Air Ministry, who required more flexibility of their aircraft. In mid 1940, a principle had been established that the manufacturing of only five types of aircraft should be pursued – two of these being fighter aircraft and three being bombers; Wallis' vision for a six-engine bomber equipped for only a specialised bomb conflicted with this concept. However, Lord Beaverbrook committed support for the project, and co-operation from both the Ministry of Aircraft Production and the Road Research Laboratory would be forthcoming to aid Wallis in developing his plans. In August 1940, the Aeronautical Research Committee permitted the use of a wind tunnel at the National Physical Laboratory in Teddington to perform tests to develop the penetration bomb.

In May 1941, the Air Staff rejected both the Victory Bomber and the bomb, observing that the aircraft was unlikely to be completed before the war ended. The thinly-stretched resources for bombers were being mostly allocated to the already-ambitious introduction of multiple four-engine bomber projects. Aviation author Paul Brickhill notes of the decision: "It was a fair assumption that it might be disastrous to dislocate [four-engine bombers] in favour of the Victory Bomber, which would inevitably take much longer to develop." However, Wallis's concepts had drawn attention within the establishment and his concepts continued to be explored, in particular the value of attacking infrastructure such as dams was being recognised, and the concept for the weapon did not meet its demise in the May 1941 decision.

The bomber design is not believed to have been developed beyond construction of a large wooden wind tunnel model which survives today at Brooklands Museum. However, the earthquake bomb idea was continued, initially as the smaller 12,000 lb (5,400 kg) Tallboy bomb, and then the larger 22,000 lb (10,000 kg) Grand Slam bomb, the carrying aircraft being a modified Avro Lancaster, whose performance had improved during the war to the point where it could manage such a load. There was further design work on large high flying bombers by the British during the war, including 75 ton (68 tonne) and 100 ton (90 tonne) design proposals, but these did not progress either. The Bristol design work for a 100-ton bomber did have some influence on the Bristol Brabazon.

== Design (as planned) ==
In response to the absence of a suitable aircraft, Wallis revived an earlier concept for a large six-engine bomber, known initially as the 'High Altitude Stratosphere Bomber' and later simply as the 'Victory Bomber'. The Victory Bomber had its origins in an earlier concept that the RAF had previously rejected prior to the war, having not even introduced four-engine bombers at the time, there had been some political support from figures such as Lord Beaverbrook, who had been appointed as the Minister of Aircraft Production in May 1940. In July 1940, Wallis was summoned to meet with Beaverbrook, and was able to briefly present the Victory Bomber concept to him, who in turn referred it for further study. On 1 November 1940, Sir Charles Craven, Vickers' Managing Director, wrote to Lord Beaverbrook to suggest that he give backing to both the bomb and the Victory Bomber.

Wallis' design for the huge six-engined Victory Bomber drew upon his prior experience and expertise. Wallis was an expert on geodetic airframe construction, having previously used it in designs such as the Wellesley (1935) and Wellington (1936), and naturally used it again for the Victory Bomber; also, all existing Vickers tooling was for this construction method. His specification was for a 50-ton (45 tonne) bomber that could fly at high altitude, 45,000 ft (14,000 m) being calculated to give the bomb maximum impact speed, at a speed of 320 mph (280 kn; 510 km/h) over a distance of 4,000 mi (3,500 nmi; 6,400 km). It would carry a single 22,400 lb (10,200 kg) "earthquake bomb". Defensive armament was minimal; speed and height would be its chief defence with one quad-gun turret in the tail position for any fighter aircraft that did attempt to reach it. The bomber would benefit by climbing to altitude while over Britain, where fighter defences could protect it. Due to the high altitudes that bombing missions would take place at, the crew compartment was pressurised.

Bombing from high altitudes posed several issues, principally amongst these being accuracy. Wallis himself acknowledged that the accuracy called for to employ the penetration bomb from 40,000 ft (12,000 m) was difficult to achieve; specifically, there was an assumption that around 25 percent of days throughout the year would be suitable for performing bombing missions in, but that during such missions the benefits of being undisturbed from ground-based anti-aircraft fire would lead to equivalent accuracy to conventional bombers flying at 15,000–20,000 ft (4,600–6,100 m) under gunfire. In response to these difficulties, Wallis had proposed the adoption of a new gyroscopic bombsight to provide for greater accuracy. The Victory Bomber was to have been capable of traversing substantial ranges, being able to launch bombing missions upon Moscow in the Soviet Union from airfields around London in the United Kingdom; Wallis also promoted the aircraft as being the potential basis for post-war civil aircraft capable of performing direct transatlantic crossings.

== Specifications (as planned) ==
General characteristics

- Length: 96 ft (29 m)
- Wingspan: 172 ft (52 m)
- Height: 11 ft (3.4 m)
- Wing area: 2,675 sq ft (248.5 m^{2})
- Gross weight: 104,000 lb (47,174 kg)
- Powerplant: 6 × Rolls-Royce Merlin or Bristol Hercules V-12 / 14-cyl radial, 1,580–1,356 hp (1,178–1,011 kW) each supercharged piston engines

Performance

- Maximum speed: 352 mph (566 km/h, 306 kn) at 32,000 ft (9,754 m)
- Service ceiling: 45,000 ft (14,000 m)

Armament

- Guns: 4× 0.303 in (7.7 mm) Browning machine guns
- Bombs: single 22,000 lb (9,979 kg) bomb

== See also ==
- Barnes Wallis
- Boeing B-29 Superfortress
- Amerika Bomber
- Convair B-36 Peacemaker
- Focke-Wulf Ta 400
- Heinkel He 277
- Messerschmitt Me 264
- Nakajima Fugaku
- Vickers Windsor
- Vickers Type C
