= Fugaku =

Fugaku (Japanese: 富嶽 or 富岳, Hepburn: Fugaku) is another name for Mount Fuji.

Fugaku may also refer to:

- Nakajima Fugaku, a planned Japanese heavy bomber designed during World War II
- Fugaku (supercomputer), a Japanese supercomputer
- Fugaku Uchiha, a Naruto character
- Fugaku Yasokichi, a Aah! Harimanada character, inspired by Konishiki Yasokichi

== See also ==
- Thirty-six Views of Mount Fuji (Japanese: 富嶽三十六景, Hepburn: Fugaku Sanjūrokkei), the ukiyo-e series created by Hokusai
- One Hundred Views of Mount Fuji (Japanese: 富嶽百景, Hepburn: Fugaku Hyakkei), a work by Osamu Dazai
