= Hans-Joachim Pancherz =

Hans-Joachim Pancherz (15 April 1914 – 4 May 2008) was a German aviator and test pilot.

He was born in Bytom, then Beuthen, in Upper Silesia. From 1933 he worked as a civilian flight instructor at the Würzburg, Kitzingen and Fürth flying schools, and at the Dresden Air War School (Luftkriegsschule 1). In 1934 he gained experience as a test pilot at the E-Stelle Rechlin, the German test centre and in 1938 was offered the chance to fly for the SCADTA airline in Colombia.

Returning to Germany in 1940, he began working for Junkers at Dessau as a test pilot, mainly with Junkers' larger machines, including the Ju 90, Ju 290 and finally the Ju 390. On 15 July 1943 he became one of the first pilots to eject from an aircraft in flight when he ejected from the Ju 290 SB+QF over Rechlin after the aircraft began to come apart in flight after a flutter test. He also helped test the Me 163 and the Ju 248, making the latter's first flight.

During World War II Pancherz was the chief pilot for Junkers on their massive six engined Ju 390 project. In his own post war recollections in 1969 he declared to the British Daily Telegraph newspaper from his home in Barcelona that he flew a Ju 390 to Cape Town and back on an air-to air refuelling mission. Following the war, he flew for the US army of occupation until 1948 when he went to Sweden. After flying Ju 52s for a local company, he joined the Swedish aviation company Malmö Flygindustri as a designer and consultant, where he worked until his retirement in 1979. He died in May 2008 at the age of 94.
