= Heinkel He 277 =

German strategic bomber design from WW2

He 277
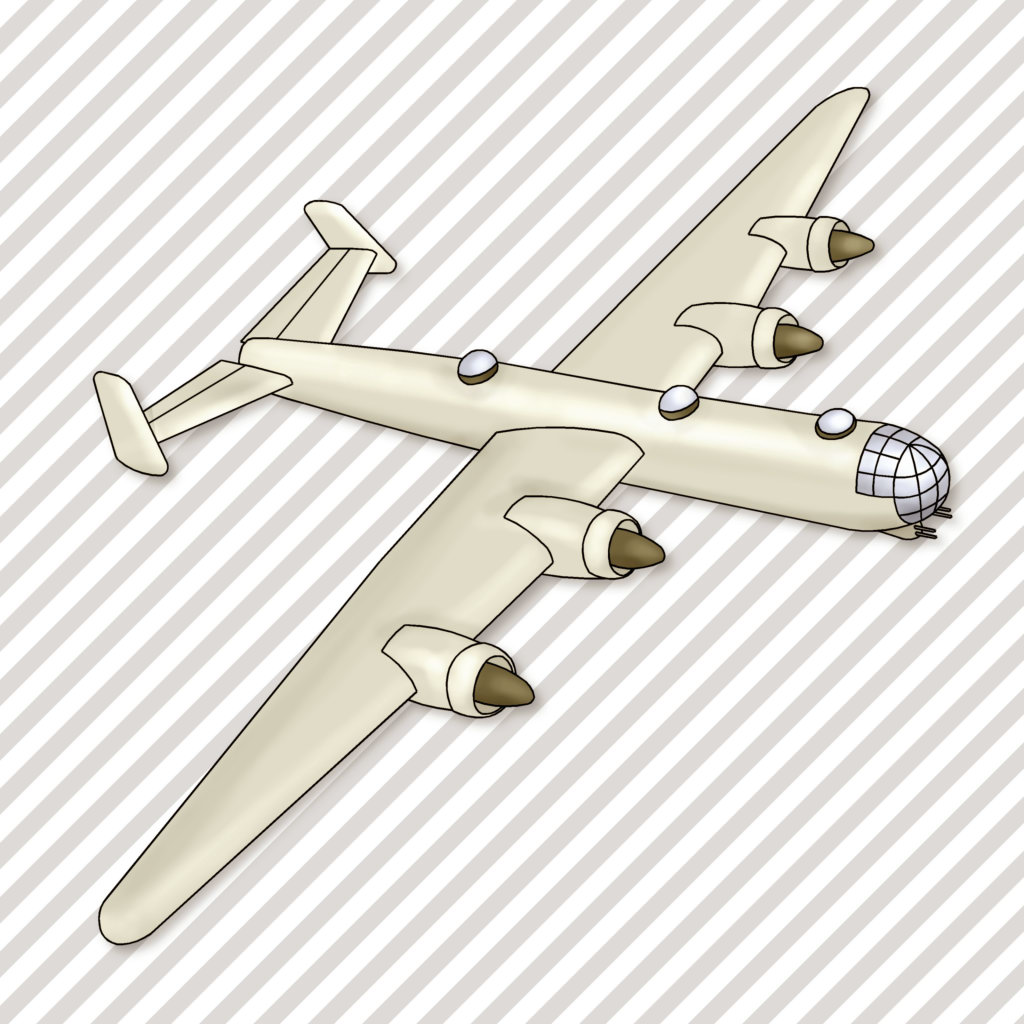

General information
- Type: Heavy Bomber/Amerikabomber,
- Manufacturer: Heinkel, received RLM airframe number by February 1943
- Status: cancelled in April 1944
- Primary user: Luftwaffe
- Number built: none completed, only parts built

History
- Developed from: Heinkel He 177

The Heinkel He 277 was a four-engine, long-range heavy bomber design, originating as a derivative of the He 177, intended for production and use by the German Luftwaffe during World War II. The main difference was in its engines. While the He 177 used four engines in two coupled pairs which proved troublesome, the He 277 was intended to use four unitized BMW 801E 14-cylinder radial engines, in single nacelle installations.

The design was never produced and no prototype airframe was completed. The deteriorating condition of the German aviation industry late in the war and the competition from other long-range bomber designs from other firms, led to the design being cancelled.

== Designation ==
For many years after the war, some aviation history books and magazine articles stated that Reichsmarschall Hermann Göring, early in World War II, was becoming so frustrated by the 177A's problems with its twin DB 606 "coupled" powerplants, that he forbade Ernst Heinkel from doing any work on a four-engined version of the 177 airframe, or even mentioning a new "He 277" design with four separate engines – by one account, in the late autumn of 1941 – until Heinkel brought the disagreement directly to Adolf Hitler, who supposedly not only approved of calling the new version of the 177 the "He 277", but overruled Göring's prohibition on working on the design (which Heinkel referred to as "He 177B" as a "cover designation" to hide its existence from Göring, and the RLM.)

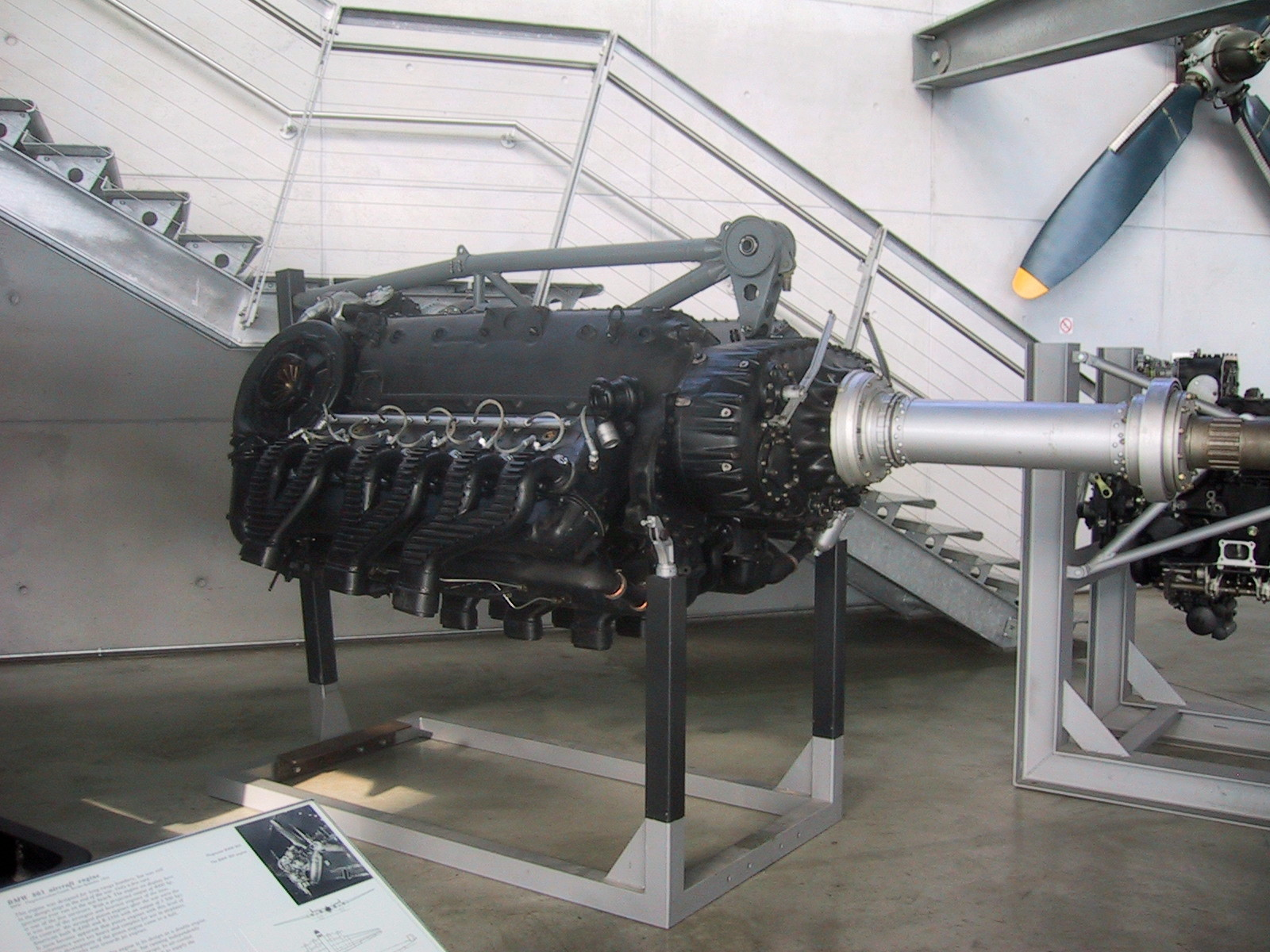
The troublesome DB 610 "welded-together engine" for an He 177A-5 – the DB 606A/B powerplants were similar in configuration, each weighing 1.5 tonnes

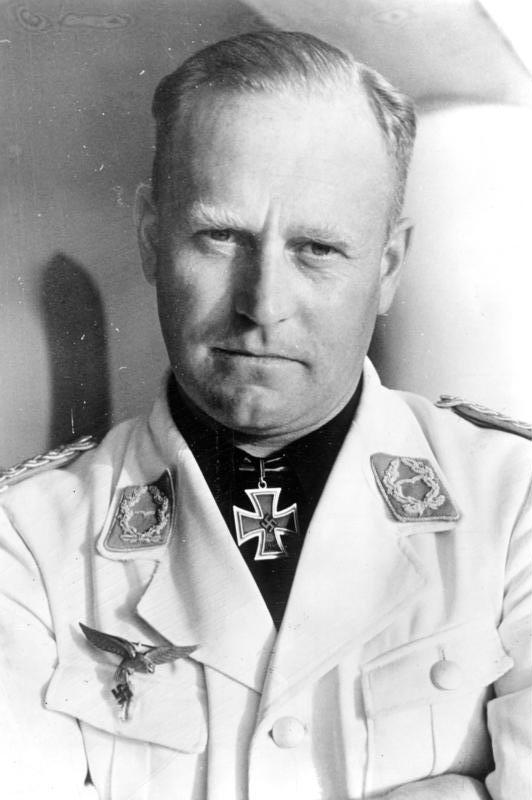
Oberst Edgar Petersen, the "KdE" commander of the Luftwaffe's test station network.

Statements by Göring in August 1942 in response to Oberst Edgar Petersen's reports – in his capacity as the Kommandeur der Erprobungstellen ("commander of all Luftwaffe test stations"), at Erprobungsstelle Rechlin – on solving the serious problems with the original Heinkel He 177A's powerplants, seem to directly contradict elements of that narrative. The statements seem to show that Göring thought that the He 177A actually had four separate engines, and in late August 1942 Göring derisively labeled the He 177A's coupled engine arrangements, the DB 606 and DB 610 "power systems", as monstrous zusammengeschweißte Motoren, ("welded-together engines",) He was anxious to see a four-engined version of the bomber developed and in production. The earliest-dated initiative to be undertaken by Ernst Heinkel himself to trial a true "four-engined" design format for the original He 177 dated back to 17 November 1938, before the construction of the He 177 V3 and V4 prototype airframes had even been started, when Heinkel had personally asked the RLM to set aside the He 177 V3 and V4 airframes for a trial installation of four separate unitized Junkers Jumo 211 powerplants to overcome the concerns that the RLM Technischen-Amt technical department's director Ernst Udet and Heinkel had expressed about the RLM's specific dive-bombing priority for the He 177A, but was turned down for the trial fitment. However, several publications listed the He 177B and He 277 as separate designs, including Nowarra (1972).

The erroneous assertion in some post-1945 aviation publications about He 177B being a cover designation for He 277" could have been due to the fact that the RLM, in listing the He 177 development projects that they approved of the Heinkel firm doing work on as of February 1943 — six months after Göring's recorded engine complaint statements, and 18 months after Heinkel conceived the paper-only "He 177H" high-altitude predecessor to the later He 274 in October 1941, only included the He 177 A-5 heavy bomber, A-6 high-altitude bomber, A-7 long-range version, and the He 277 itself, defining the February 1943 date as the earliest reliable date of any official RLM mention of He 277, as this date also indicates the time by which the RLM had issued the Heinkel firm the 8-277 number for the project. The RLM as of late spring of 1943 anticipated that three He 277 V-series prototype aircraft, and construction of ten pre-production He 277A-0 series service test machines would come from Heinkel's Schwechat southern plant complex in Austria beginning in 1944.

The He 277's fuselage design had been meant to originate with the last proposed "coupled-engine" variant of the He 177, the long-range A-7, which itself was to be the basis for a four-engined variant of the Greif as the He 177A-10 (redesignated He 177B-7 in the late summer of 1943). The considerable changes in the He 277's overall design philosophy evolved after the Amerikabomber requirement’s emergence in 1941, from the changes in the He 277's general arrangement proposal drawings during that time period, especially after Heinkel had worked out the earlier P.1064 project in 1942 for a six-engine strategic bomber. The original proposal, which was meant to use the He 177A-7's fuselage as the starting point, evolved into designing a dedicated, new and wider He 219-general pattern fuselage layout for the 277 from the Spring 1943 timeframe onward, which would be more capable of using a tricycle undercarriage then gaining favor with a few German aviation designers.

The main factor that seemingly required the lower-drag "coupled" powerplant format for the He 177A, the dive bomb attack mandated by the RLM (and which Ernst Heinkel had vehemently disagreed with from the late 1930s) was rescinded by Göring five months before approval of the "He 277's" by the RLM in February 1943. Heinkel started work on the He 177B as a straightforward, separately four-engined development of the 177A under the B-series designation at least as early as the late summer of 1943, when official Heinkel documents began referring to the He 177B, evidenced from an August 1943-dated, Heinkel factory-created general arrangement Typenblatt drawing of the He 177 V101 being labeled with the 8-177 RLM designation for the entire line of Greif airframes, and "B-5" elsewhere in the drawing's title block, as a fully RLM approved development of the original He 177 aircraft line, and not in any way directly related to the entirely separate He 277 advanced bomber project, which by the summer of 1943 was considered to be Heinkel's Amerikabomber aviation contract contender. The first development of the original He 177A to fly with four "individual" engines – using a quartet of He 219-style annular radiators to cool its likely-unitized Daimler-Benz DB 603 powerplants – was the second He 177B prototype, the He 177 V102, on December 20, 1943.

In total, there were four separate efforts, the movement toward which had been initiated by Ernst Heinkel as early as November 1938, to develop "true four-engined versions" of the A-series Greif: the unbuilt He 179 with four Jumkers Jumo 211s; the He 177B, which culminated in four prototype examples being built, with three getting airborne before the war's end; the He 274, of which only two prototypes were started before the end of World War II and completed and flown in France after the war's end; and the He 277, for which only a few airframe parts had been in the process of completion, with no completed prototypes at any time, before the project’s cancellation in May 1944.

== Design features ==
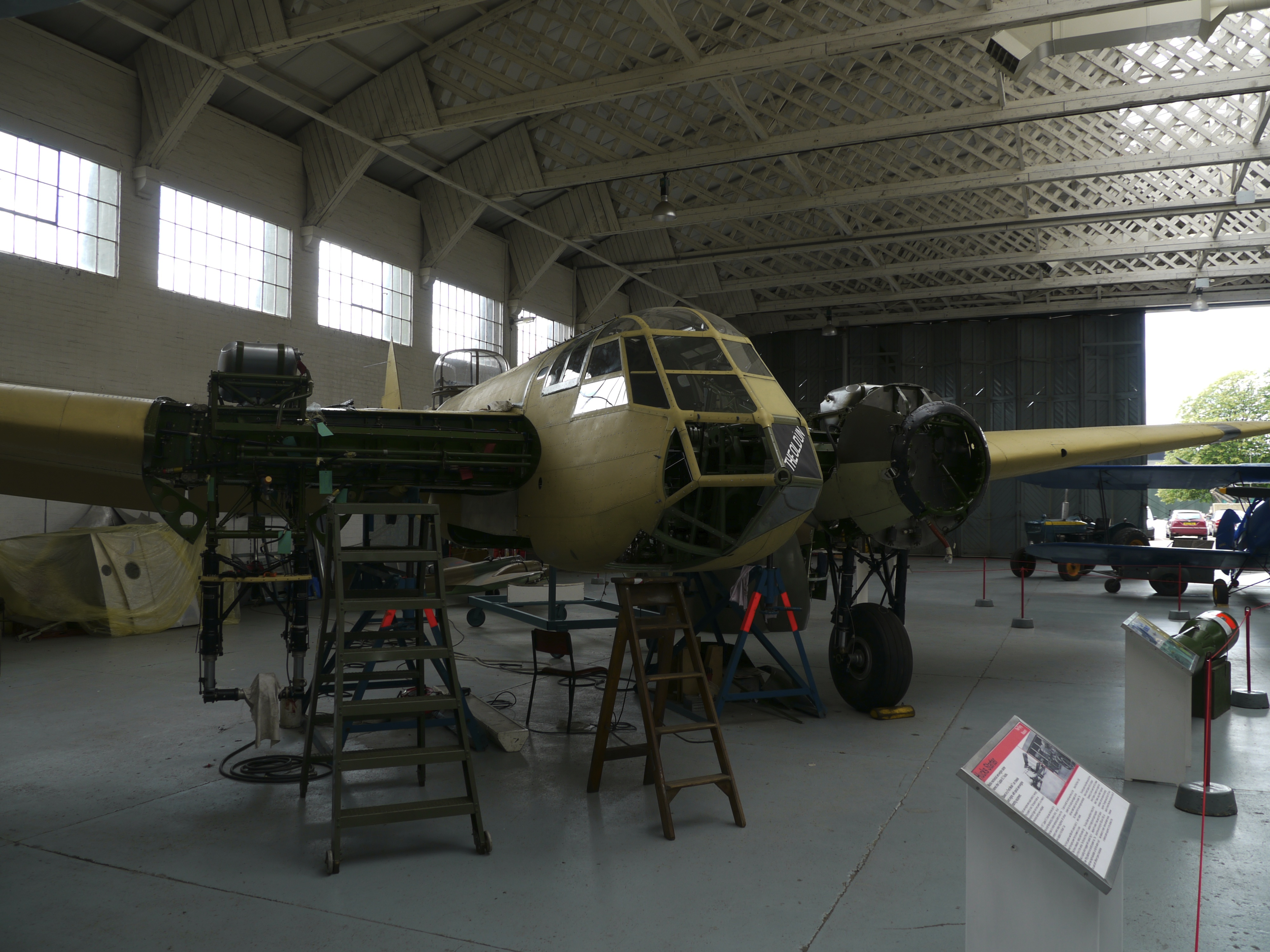
This restored Bristol Blenheim Mk.I's nose echoes the intended shape for the He 277 Amerikabomber forward cockpit design, which also incorporated an upper cockpit glazing layout resembling the design for the Avro Lancaster.

The general arrangement Typenblatt drawings that Heinkel's firm was developing for the He 277 by mid-1943 show an advanced design of heavy bomber, with a 133 square meter area (1,431.6 sq. ft.) "shoulder mount", 40 meter (131 ft 3 in) span wing design, four separate BMW 801E powerplants of 1,471 kW (2,000 PS, 1,973 hp) output each at take-off, with each engine turning a propeller of up to four meters in diameter.

The fully retracting undercarriage considered for the design was to be either conventional or nosewheel landing gear, with main gear assemblies of twinned wheels on each unit, retracting into the inner engine nacelles (forward when combined with the nosewheel but rearwards for a conventional gear arrangement). Heinkel had designed a retractable tricycle undercarriage-equipped in late 1939 for the Heinkel He 280 jet fighter prototype, and followed that with the Heinkel He 219 night fighter.

The main crew accommodation of the He 277 consisted of a heavily glazed and "greenhouse"-framed clear view "stepless" cockpit, a common feature of many late-war German bomber airframes and new designs. Immediately aft of the heavily glazed nose, the cockpit glazing over the crew seating and pilot accommodation-enclosing upper section that was blended with the nose glazing's contours, protruding above the 277's forward dorsal fuselage decking level, with a rearward extension atop the fuselage that faired-in the forward upper dorsal turret's forward surface, extending rearwards to just forward of the inner engine cowls. The fuselage outlines themselves were deep, and almost slab-sided in cross-section, with its general sideview profile lines being strongly reminiscent of the He 219. This similarity with the 219 even extended to the depictions of the He 277's fuselage-mounted defensive armament emplacements as proposed by Heinkel, with one forward and two aft-facing "steps" along the slightly rounded dorsal and ventral surfaces of the fuselage, much like the smaller night fighter's earliest prototypes had, for the 277's manned aft dorsal and remote aft ventral turret defensive weapons mounts — the aft ventral emplacement being moved rearwards by roughly two meters, in comparison with the early He 219V-series prototypes, to accommodate the aft end of the He 277's bomb bay. The twin tail empennage assembly of the He 219 night fighter was also a likely inspiration for the 277's own similar unit, that added aerodynamic stability when compared to the 177A's single vertical tail – proven to be true from the first flights of the He 177B-series' four-engined He 177 V102 twin-tailed prototype from late December 1943 onwards – and made mounting a powered traversable defensive tail turret easier. Provision was shown on the Heinkel Typenblatt general arrangement drawing for four underwing hardpoints, two per wing panel on either side outboard of the engines, potentially allowing external ordnance loads or drop tanks to extend the bomber's capabilities or range.

A May 1943 Heinkel factory document showed possible offensive bombload configurations and flight consumable (fuel, etc.) weights for the He 277, two differing bomb bay sizes (interior dimensions of 1.5 × 7.5 meters for the tailwheel version, and 1.75 × 7.0 meters for the tricycle undercarriage version) were considered. The latter within a 1.90 meter wide fuselage. The lightest warload of six 500 kg (1,100 lb) SC 500 bombs for each bomb bay configuration, gave the tricycle-geared, 1.9 meter exterior width wider-fuselage version, considering a larger load (12,200 kg/26,895 lb) of fuel, a possible stated maximum range of 11,100 km (6,900 mi), equalling the potential range capability of the earlier-designed Me 261, an indicator of what could have been achieved had the 277 been in full consideration from its beginnings for the Amerikabomber design competition.

=== Armament ===
As envisioned the defensive armament was in five turrets; two manned, and the other three remotely operated. A remotely operated Fernbedienbare Drehlafette (FDL) 151Z turret with twin 20 mm MG 151/20 cannon was in the "chin" position under the aircraft's nose. Along the top of the fuselage were a remotely operated FDL 151Z in the forward dorsal and a manned Hydraulische Drehlafette (HDL) 151Z in the rear dorsal position; each turret with two MG 151/20 cannon. Underneath the rear fuselage, just to the rear of the bomb-bay was a remotely operated ventral turret with two more MG 151/20 cannon. The gunner for the turret would lay prone, facing rearwards in a starboard-side offset position with a slightly protruding ventral blister-like gondola for the gun sight. In the end of the tail was a manned Hecklafette (HL) 131V turret with four 13 mm MG 131 heavy machine guns. The Hecklafette four-gun turret was planned to be used on some of the other Amerikabomber airframes, Heinkel's proposed developments of the He 177A airframe, and a projected "C-version" of the He 219 night fighter. This increasing demand for an advanced gun turret that had not even been produced by Borsig (the firm responsible for it), beyond a small number of test units and engineering mockups led to an alternative twin-cannon "HL 151Z" version with a single MG 151/20 cannon each side of the turret. Only a few ground test examples of the twin-cannon variant tail turret had been produced by March 1944. One of these twin-cannon experimental tail turrets was mounted on an He 177A airframe for testing. Some sideview line drawing depictions of purported "He 277" aircraft, usually in the same aviation history volumes that purveyed the erroneous "He 177B/He 277" storyline, also show what could be an early He 177A-7-based depiction of the later Amerikabomber competitor bearing the He 177A's "Cabin 3" standard cockpit and a quartet of the He 219-derived Kraftei DB 603 inverted V12 engines actually used on the four He 177B-series prototypes (He 177 V101 through V104) for power, with the abandoned Bugstandlafette BL 131V quadmount remote turret as a "chin turret" in place of the FDL 151Z system in the Heinkel firm's factory Typenblatt drawings – the BL 131V had been abandoned in 1943 as too heavy (reducing offensive bombload by a full tonne) and slowing the earlier He 177A airframe by some 30 km/h in top airspeed due to drag, making even the chance of its proposed existence on any He 277 design proposals unlikely.

== Competing bomber designs ==
Throughout the time that the He 277 design was being worked on, Ernst Heinkel was facing competition from other heavy bomber designs under development, and other four-engined aircraft proposals that showed promise as heavy bombers: the Focke-Wulf Fw 300, and Ta 400, Junkers Ju 390, Messerschmitt Me 264, and Heinkel's own He 274 four-engined, high-altitude development of the He 177.

The first of these designs that the He 277 was pitted against, mostly to determine the "most producible" bomber that could also be license-built, given Germany's limited aircraft production capacity to arm the Luftwaffe with, and partially to determine the best long-range bomber design to fulfill the needs of the spring 1942-issued Amerikabomber program documents, the Messerschmitt Me 264 ended up being the first design to challenge the He 277's chance for production. The Me 264 was a purpose-built long-range bomber, using a tricycle landing gear configuration from the start. The Me 264 prototypes were already flying their test programs with power of exactly the same choice that Heinkel had asked for on November 17, 1938, for the He 177 V3 and V4 prototypes: with four Junkers Jumo 211 engines as early as late December 1942 – a full year after Nazi Germany had declared war on the United States, five months after the Eighth Air Force had begun flying bomber missions against Nazi-occupied France, and two months before the RLM's earliest-known mention of any recorded approval for the He 277 design itself — the later fitment of a quartet of the BMW 801 radials to each example of the trio of Me 264 prototypes also potentially challenged the availability of the same engine design that the He 277 was meant to use, had the Me 264 gone into production with them.

Development of the Me 264's was stopped in May 1943 because of the need to use scarce strategic materials in its construction, and because of the better predicted performance of the Focke-Wulf Ta 400 and the He 277,.

With the US involvement in the European theater commencing in mid-August 1942, the Luftwaffe now found that it had a serious need for a well-armed, long-range bomber, which could not be achieved with the 1,120 kW (1,500 hp) class engines it had. Such ongoing difficulties in developing high-output aviation powerplants of over 1,500 kW apiece, that could be used in combat with proven reliability – which excluded the DB 606 engines of the earlier He 177A variants, which themselves proved to be seriously troublesome from the start of the He 177A's combat service in 1942 – meant that six engines of the under-1,500 kW (2,000 PS) power output levels would be needed on a strategic bomber design to fly from Europe, attack the US and safely return to base, with an effective bombload to be effective, and adequate defensive firepower. It was events on July 3, 1943, that seemed to cement this viewpoint in the RLM's mind – no production decisions on the still-unfinalized He 277's design had emerged by that date, and the continuing problems in Dessau with the high-output Junkers Jumo 222 engine had set back its development, making its use with the He 277, first proposed on that date, even more problematic. The Blohm & Voss firm's aviation division had already settled on six engines with success, as early as 1940, on the prototypes of the BV 222 Wiking flying boat maritime patrol aircraft (a 46-meter wingspan aircraft). This emerging need for six engines for such an aircraft was also recognized by Messerschmitt AG, which fielded a paper project for a six-engined "Me 264B", with a wingspan stretched to 47.5 meters (155 ft 10 in)), with two additional BMW 801 radial engines outboard of the existing four powerplants and the same Hecklafette four-gun tail turret as the He 277. Eventually, the Heinkel firm received an order on July 23, 1943 from the Reich Air Ministry's technical department (Technischen Amt) – for Heinkel to design a set of wings for the 277's unfinalized design that could accept four of the troubled Jumo 222 engines, alongside the still "paper-only" concept also being ordered to be designed and buildable with the desired six-engine format the RLM was now favoring for an Amerikabomber, intended to be upwards of a 170 square meter (1,830 sq. ft.) wing area of 45 meter (147 ft 7 in) span to possibly accommodate either four Jumo 222s or six BMW 801s.

In March 1943, Focke-Wulf came up with a six-engined version of their proposed Fw 300 bomber, originally powered with just four BMW 801E radials. Their more advanced Ta 400 design, first proposed in October 1943 with a tricycle landing gear setup and meant to be powered six of the same engines as the 277 was meant to use, was joined by the Ju 390, a Junkers six-engined development of their Junkers Ju 290 maritime patrol bomber, and also using six of the same BMW radials as the 277, with both the earlier four-engined A-8 variant of the Ju 290, and the Ju 390A-1 each meant to have a pair of the He 277's Hecklafette quad-gun tail turrets, but with one each in the planned tail position and in a new nose-mount version.

By October 1943, Ernst Heinkel had compared the Messerschmitt and Junkers four-engined designs, and the six-engined BV 222, Ju 390 and Ta 400 designs to his own He 277 project, with the following conclusions:

In our opinion, the Me 264 is a record-breaking aircraft, and does not come up to service requirements for operations in large numbers. The BV 222 and Ju 290 are far too big and are not bombers, in addition to which the Ju 290 has to be altered to Ju 390 (six engines). This would make the construction effort bigger still. Thus, only the Ta 400 and the He 277 remain as useful operational aircraft.

Of these competing types mentioned by Dr. Heinkel – outside of the thirteen BV 222 six-engined maritime patrol flying boats actually built – only three of the Me 264 design, and a verified pair of the Ju 390 aircraft were ever built, solely as flyable prototypes, and none of these aircraft saw any action against the Allies.

The He 274, because of its own intended high-altitude role, was only a potential competitor with the He 277 for Heinkel's own company engineering and production staff, and the He 274's production had already been outsourced by the end of 1941 to the French Societe Anonyme des Usines Farman, or "SAUF" firm in Suresnes to partially allow Heinkel to work on other projects, like the He 277 and the more advanced Heinkel He 343 jet powered medium bomber design, both of which each had a few airframe components in the process of manufacture for prototype airframes, but with both designs never able to be completed as flyable aircraft.

== End of the project ==
In April 1944, simultaneously with the four He 177B prototypes either flying (He 177 V101 to V103) or nearing completion (V104) at the Heinkel-Süd facility at Schwechat, the RLM ordered Heinkel to cease any further work on the He 277 project, and all components were also ordered to be scrapped, without any complete examples of the 277 ever having been completed by Heinkel, only three months before the "Emergency Fighter Programme" (Jägernotprogramm) took over all German military aircraft production priorities on July 3, 1944. Only the Heinkel He 162 Spatz lightweight jet fighter was allowed to progress into production by the RLM after that.

== Specifications (He 277 basic configuration design ) ==
Data from Griehl, Manfred and Dressel

General characteristics

- Crew: 7
- Length: 23.00 m (75 ft 5 in)
- Wingspan: 40.00 m (131 ft 3 in)
- Height: 6.05 m (19 ft 10-3/16 in)
- Wing area: 133.00 m^{2} (1,431.60 ft^{2})
- Empty weight: 21,800 kg (48,060 lb)
- Max takeoff weight: 44,500 kg (98,105 lb)
- Powerplant: 4× BMW 801E 14-cylinder, twin row-radial engine, 1,492 kW (1,973 hp for takeoff) each
- maximum of 16,950 litre/4,478 US gallon fuel/fluid-consumables capacity for Amerikabomber mission profile

Performance

- Maximum speed: 570 km/h at 5,700 m (354 mph at 18,700 ft)
- Cruise speed: 460 km/h (286 mph)
- Range: 6,000 km (3,728 mi) up to 11,100 km/6,900 mi in Amerikabomber role
- Service ceiling: 9,000 m (30,000 ft)
- Wing loading: 334.6 kg/m^{2} at MTOW (68.6 lb/ft^{2})

Armament

- Guns: * 2 × 20 mm (0.79 in) MG 151/20 autocannon in remotely operated, undernose Fernbedienbare Drehlafette FDL 151Z "chin" turret
  - 4 × 20 mm (0.79 in) MG 151/20 in twin dorsal turrets, one FDL-type remotely operated forward and one aft Hydraulische Drehlafette HDL 151Z hydraulically powered manned turret
  - 2 × 20 mm (0.79 in) MG 151/20 in FDL-style remotely operated, ventral turret facing aft, behind bomb bay
  - 4 × 13 mm (0.51 in) MG 131 machine guns in Hecklafette HL 131V "quadmount", manned tail turret
- Bombs: up to 3,000 kg (6,612 lb) of offensive ordnance stores for Amerikabomber trans-Atlantic missions, maximum of 5,600 kg (12,345 lb) internally for shorter ranges, up to 8,600 km (5,340 miles) w/maximum bomb load.

== See also ==
- Amerikabomber

Related development

- Heinkel He 177
- Heinkel He 274

Aircraft of comparable role, configuration, and era

- Boeing B-29 Superfortress
- Junkers Ju 488
- Nakajima Fugaku

Related lists

- List of German aircraft projects, 1939–1945
- List of military aircraft of Germany
- List of World War II military aircraft of Germany
