= Messerschmitt Me 264 =

German strategic bomber prototype

Me 264
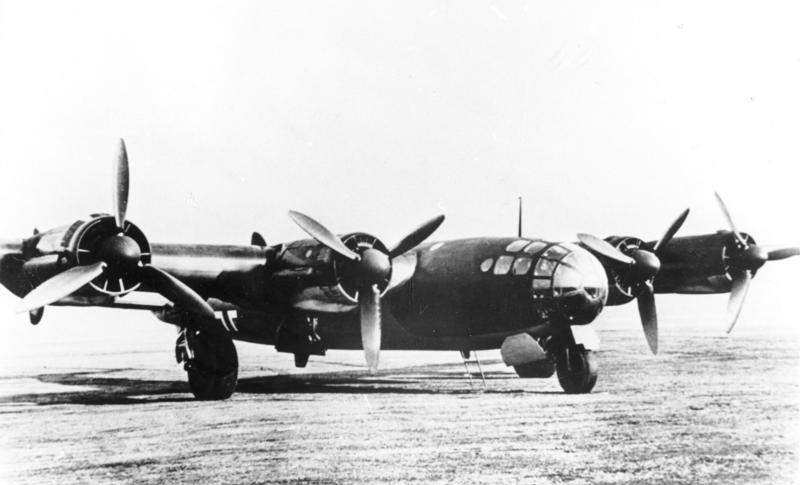
- Me 264 V1 prototype with Jumo 211 powerplants

General information
- Type: Trans-oceanic Strategic bomber Maritime patrol aircraft
- National origin: Nazi Germany
- Manufacturer: Messerschmitt
- Designer: Wolfgang Degel, Paul Konrad and Woldemar Voigt
- Status: Retired
- Primary user: Luftwaffe
- Number built: 3

History
- Manufactured: 1941
- Introduction date: 1942
- First flight: 23 December 1942
- Retired: 1945
- Developed into: Messerschmitt P.1107

The Messerschmitt Me 264 was a long-range strategic bomber developed during World War II for the German Luftwaffe as its main strategic bomber. The design was later selected as Messerschmitt's competitor in the Reichsluftfahrtministerium's (the German Air Ministry) Amerikabomber (America Bomber) programme, for a strategic bomber capable of attacking New York City from bases in France or the Azores.

Three prototypes were built but production was abandoned to allow Messerschmitt to concentrate on fighter production and the Junkers Ju 390 was selected in its place. Development continued as a maritime reconnaissance aircraft instead.

== Development ==
The origin of the Me 264 design came from Messerschmitt's long-range reconnaissance aircraft project, the P.1061, of the late 1930s. A variant on the P.1061 was the P.1062 of which three prototypes were built, with only two "engines" to the P.1061's four, but they were the more powerful Daimler-Benz DB 606 "power systems", each comprising a pair of DB 601 inverted V-12 engines. These were also used in the long-range Messerschmitt Me 261, itself originating as the Messerschmitt P.1064 design of 1937. The DB 606's later use in the Heinkel He 177A's airframe design resulted in derision by Reichsmarschall Hermann Göring as "welded-together engines" in August 1942, due to badly designed engine installations. In early 1941, six P.1061 prototypes were ordered from Messerschmitt, under the designation Me 264. This was later reduced to three prototypes.

The progress of these projects was slow but after Germany had declared war on the United States four days after the Pearl Harbor attack by Imperial Japan, the Reichsluftfahrtministerium (RLM) started the more serious Amerikabomber programme in the spring of 1942 for a very long range bomber, with the result that a larger, six-engine aircraft with a greater bomb load was called for. Proposals were put forward for the Junkers Ju 390, the Focke-Wulf Ta 400, a redesign of the Heinkel He 277 design (itself only receiving its RLM airframe number by February 1943 to give Heinkel an entry in the Amerikabomber program later in 1943), and a design study for an extended-wingspan six-engine Messerschmitt Me 264B. The need for six engines was prompted by the inability of Germany's aero-engine designers to create reliable powerplants of 2,000 PS (1,470 kW) and greater, thwarting efforts to do the same with four engines instead. As the similarly six-engined Junkers Ju 390 could use components already in use for the Ju 290 this design was chosen. The Me 264 was not abandoned as the Kriegsmarine (German navy) separately demanded a long-range maritime patrol and attack aircraft to replace the converted Fw 200 Condor in this role. This was reinforced by an opinion given by then-Generalmajor Eccard Freiherr von Gablenz of the Heer (German Army) in May 1942, who had been recruited by Generalfeldmarschall Erhard Milch to give his opinion on the suitability of the Me 264 for the Amerikabomber mission; Gablenz echoed the Kriegsmarine's later opinion. The two pending prototypes were ordered to be completed as development prototypes for the Me 264A ultra long-range reconnaissance aircraft.

== Design ==
The Me 264 was an all-metal, high-wing, four-engine heavy bomber of classic construction. The fuselage was round in cross-section and had a cabin in a glazed nose, comprising a "stepless cockpit" with no separate windscreen section for the pilots, which was common for most later German bomber designs. A strikingly similar design was used for the B-29, of slightly earlier origin. The wing had a slightly swept leading edge and a straight trailing edge. The empennage had double tail fins. The undercarriage was a retractable tricycle gear with large-diameter wheels on the wing-mounted main gear.

The planned armament consisted of guns in remotely operated turrets and in positions on the sides of the fuselage. It carried very little armour and few guns as a means of increasing fuel capacity and range. The Me 264's first prototype was originally fitted with four Junkers Jumo 211 inverted V12 engines using the new Kraftei (or "power-egg") engine installation as standardized for the earlier Ju 88A Schnellbomber, but inadequate power from the Jumo 211 engines led to their replacement on the Me 264 V1 first prototype with four 1,700 PS (1,250 kW) BMW 801G engines. To provide comfort on the proposed long-range missions, the Me 264 featured bunk beds and a small galley complete with hot plates.

== Operational history ==
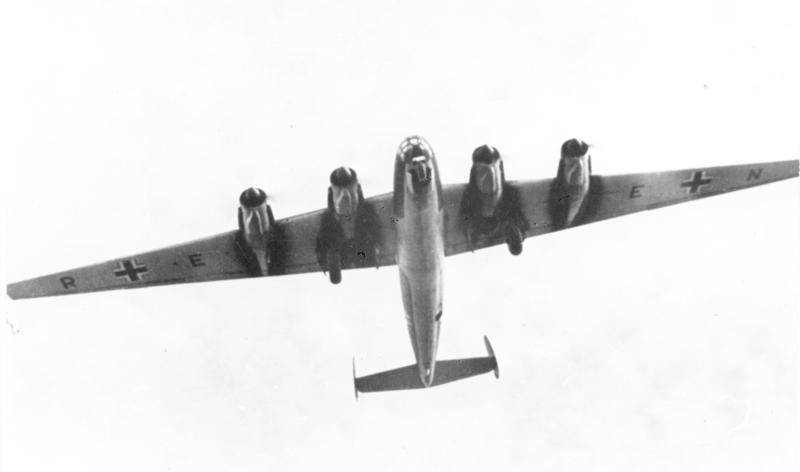
Me 264 V1 undergoing flight testing.

The first prototype, Me 264 V1, bearing a Stammkennzeichen (factory code) of RE+EN, was flown on 23 December 1942. It was powered at first by four Jumo 211J inline engines of 1,340 PS (986 kW) each. In late 1943, these were changed to the BMW 801G radials which delivered 1,750 PS (1,287 kW). Trials showed numerous minor faults and handling was found to be difficult. One of the drawbacks was the very high wing loading of the Me 264 in fully loaded conditions at some 356 kg/m^{2} (73 lb/sq ft). Comparable contemporary aircraft had lower wing loadings: the B-29 had 337 kg/m^{2} (69 lb/sq ft), the redesigned He 277 334.6 kg/m^{2} (68.5 lb/sq ft) and the Ju 390 a much lower 209 kg/m^{2} (43 lb/sq ft). The relatively high wing loading caused poor climb performance, loss of manoeuvrability, stability and high take-off and landing speeds. In addition, the first prototype was not fitted with weapons or armour, the weight of which would have caused worse performance.

The second prototype, Me 264 V2, was completed with armour around the engines, crew and gun positions, but defensive weapons and other vital operational equipment were never fitted. The never-completed Me 264 V3 was to have been fully armed and armoured.

In 1943, the Kriegsmarine withdrew their interest in the Me 264, in favour of the Ju 290 and the planned Ju 390. The Luftwaffe indicated a preference for the unbuilt Ta 400 and the Heinkel He 277 as Amerikabomber candidates in May 1943, based on their performance estimates. In October 1943, Milch officially cancelled development work on the Me 264, so that Messerschmitt could concentrate on other projects, including development and production of the Me 262 jet fighter-bomber. No further payments for development work on the Me 264 were made to Messerschmitt AG.

Late in 1943, the second prototype, Me 264 V2, was destroyed in a bombing attack. On 18 July 1944, the first prototype, which had entered service with Transportstaffel 5, was damaged during an Allied bombing raid and was not repaired. The third prototype, which was unfinished, was destroyed during the same raid.

In April 1944, the competing Junkers project was cancelled. Consequently, on 23 September 1944, work on the Me 264 project was officially cancelled. Messerschmitt proposed a six-engine version, known as the Me 264/6m or Me 364, which also remained unbuilt.

== Specifications (Me 264 V3) ==
Data from The warplanes of the Third Reich

General characteristics

- Crew: 8
- Length: 20.8979 m (68 ft 6.75 in)
- Wingspan: 43.00 m (141 ft 1 in)
- Height: 4.2990 m (14 ft 1.25 in)
- Wing area: 127.700 m^{2} (1,374.55 sq ft)
- Empty weight: 21,150 kg (46,627 lb)
- Max takeoff weight: 56,001 kg (123,460 lb)
- Powerplant: 4 × BMW 801D (or BMW 801G) 14-cylinder air-cooled radial piston engines, 1,300 kW (1,700 hp) each for take-off

1,059 kW (1,440 hp) at 5,700 m (18,700 ft)

- Propellers: 3-bladed constant-speed propellers

Performance

- Maximum speed: 546 km/h (339 mph, 295 kn) at 36,000 kg (79,366 lb) at 6,100 m (20,015 ft)

470 km/h (290 mph; 250 kn) at 34,400 kg (75,840 lb) at 8,300 m (27,230 ft)

565 km/h (351 mph; 305 kn) at 8,300 m (27,230 ft) with GM-1 operating

- Cruise speed: 349 km/h (217 mph, 188 kn) at 8,000 m (26,250 ft)
- Range: 15,000 km (9,300 mi, 8,100 nmi) 333 km/h (207 mph; 180 kn)
- Service ceiling: 8,000 m (26,250 ft) at 36,000 kg (79,366 lb)
- Rate of climb: 2.00 m/s (393 ft/min)

Armament

- Guns:
  - 4 × 13 mm (0.51 in) MG 131 machine guns
  - 2 × 20 mm MG 151/20 cannon
- Bombs: 3,000 kg (6,614 lb) bombload in internal bomb bay at 14,400 km (8,947 miles). 6,000 kg (13,200 lbs) bombload in internal bomb bay at 8,600 km (5,343 miles)

== See also ==
Related development

- Messerschmitt P.1107

Aircraft of comparable role, configuration, and era

- Avro Lincoln
- Boeing B-29 Superfortress
- Consolidated B-32 Dominator
- Focke-Wulf Ta 400
- Heinkel He 277
- Junkers Ju 390
- Nakajima Fugaku
- Piaggio P.108
- Victory Bomber

Related lists

- List of aircraft of World War II
- List of WW2 Luftwaffe aircraft prototype projects
- List of bomber aircraft
