= Focke-Wulf Ta 400 =

German bomber design in World War II

Ta 400

General information
- Type: Long-range bomber
- Manufacturer: Focke-Wulf
- Designer: Kurt Tank
- Primary user: Luftwaffe
- Number built: incomplete prototype only

The Focke-Wulf Ta 400 was a large six-engined heavy bomber design developed in Nazi Germany in 1943 by Focke-Wulf as a serious contender for the Amerikabomber project. One of the first aircraft to be developed from components from multiple countries, it was also one of the most advanced Focke-Wulf designs of World War II, though it never progressed beyond a wind tunnel model.

Designed as a bomber and long-range reconnaissance plane by Kurt Tank, the Ta 400 had a shoulder-mounted wing with 4° dihedral. One of the most striking features were the six BMW 801D radial engines, to which two Jumo 004 jet engines were later added.

== Design and development ==
In response to the RLM guidelines of 22 January 1942, Kurt Tank of the Focke-Wulf company designed the Ta 400 as a bomber and long-range reconnaissance aircraft, to be powered by six BMW 801D radial engines, to which two Jumo 004 jet engines were later added. Design work was begun in 1943, much of it being carried out by French technicians working for Focke-Wulf at the Arsenal de l'Aéronautique at Châtillon-sous-Bagneux near Paris, with contracts for design and construction of major components being awarded to German, French, and Italian companies in an attempt to speed the process and begin construction of prototypes as soon as possible.

The Ta 400 had a shoulder-mounted wing with 4° dihedral, with a long straight center section extending to the middle engine on each wing, and highly tapered outer wing panels. It had twin vertical stabilizers mounted at the tips of the tailplane. Like the American Boeing B-29 Superfortress, the Ta 400 was to have a pressurized crew compartment and tail turret, connected by pressurized tunnel, as well as multiple remote-controlled turrets. The crew of nine was to be protected by a heavy defensive armament, including ten 20 mm MG 151 cannons; and the same Hecklafette quadmount tail-turret with four MG 131 machine guns, as the later model Heinkel He 177A-series aircraft and He 177B bombers would have used. Fuel supply was to have distributed across 32 fuel tanks. Another design feature was tricycle landing gear.

The maximum bomb load was to have been 24 t (53,000 lb). With a gross weight of 80.27 tonnes (177,000 lb), the Ta 400 with DB 603 engines was estimated to have a range of 12,000 km (7,500 mi) in the reconnaissance role, cruising at 325 km/h (202 mph). The two bomber versions would have 76.07 tonnes (83.85 short tons) and 80.87 tonnes (89.14 short tons) gross weights with estimated ranges of 4,500 km (2,800 mi) and 10,600 km (6,600 mi) respectively. The projected Jumo-powered aircraft would have had a maximum range of 14,000 km (8,700 mi) for long range reconnaissance and 13,000 km (8,100 mi) as a bomber.

As with the Heinkel He 277 competitor for the Amerikabomber contract, no prototype of the Ta 400 was ever built. It never progressed beyond a wind tunnel model, and performance, range and dimensions here are based solely on the designers' estimates. The master aircraft designer Ernst Heinkel himself remarked in October 1943, while both designs were still being worked on, that he thought that only the Ta 400 could be a worthy competitor to his firm's He 277, for the Amerika Bomber competition.

The Ta 400 was essentially a backup design for the Messerschmitt Me 264. As the design required more materials and labor than the Me 264, the RLM became convinced that further development of the Ta 400 was a waste, and on 15 October 1943 notified Focke-Wulf that the program would be terminated, but the minutes of a meeting in Italy between Tank and Italian aviation industrialists on 18 April 1944 – just two days before the entire He 277 program was also cancelled – confirmed that work on the design was still ongoing and proposed the cooperation of Italian industry in the project.

== Specifications (Ta 400, estimated) ==
General characteristics

- Crew: nine
- Gross weight: 60,000 kg (132,277 lb)
- Powerplant: 6 × BMW 801D 14-cyl. air-cooled twin-row radial piston engines, 1,300 kW (1,700 hp) each
- Powerplant: 2 × Junkers Jumo 004 turbojet engines, 8.8 kN (2,000 lbf) thrust each

Performance

- Maximum speed: 720 km/h (450 mph, 390 kn)
- Range: 9,000 km (5,600 mi, 4,900 nmi)

Armament

- Guns:
  - 6 × MG 151/20 in three twin turrets
  - Four MG 131 machine guns mounted in tail turret.
  - 2 × MG 131 machine guns in two remote-controlled turrets under the nose.
- Bombs:
  - 10,000 kg (22,000 lb) to 5,589 miles

== See also ==
Related development

- Fw 300

Aircraft of comparable role, configuration, and era

- Boeing B-29 Superfortress
- Heinkel He 277
- Junkers Ju 390
- Messerschmitt Me 264
- Nakajima G10N
- Victory Bomber
