= Nakajima Fugaku =

Planned Japanese ultra-long-range heavy bomber designed during World War II

Fugaku
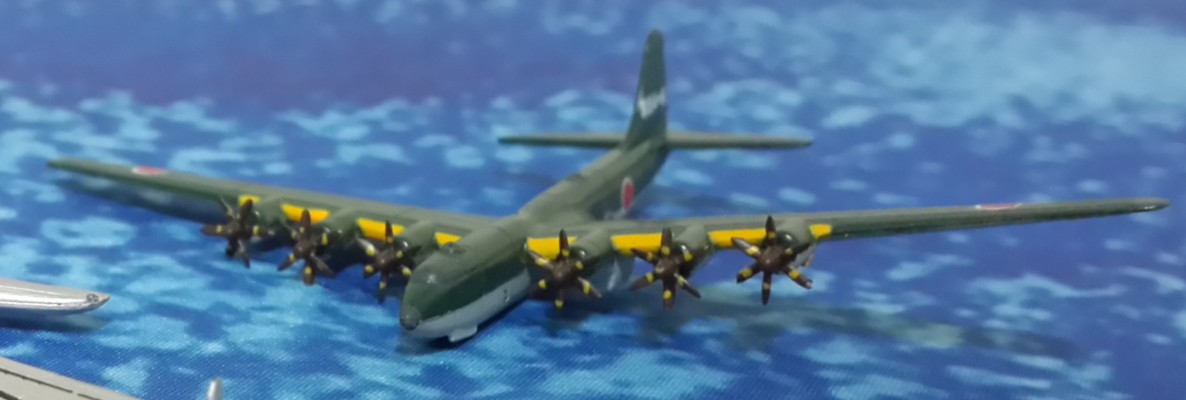
- Model of a Fugaku

General information
- Type: Ultra-long-range heavy bomber
- Manufacturer: Nakajima Aircraft Company
- Status: Project (cancelled)
- Primary user: Imperial Japanese Navy Air Service
- Number built: none

The Nakajima Fugaku (富嶽, Mount Fuji) was a planned Japanese ultra-long-range heavy bomber designed during World War II. It was conceived as a method for mounting aerial attacks from Japan against industrial targets at any location within the United States. Japan's worsening war situation resulted in the project's cancellation in 1944 and no prototype was ever built.

The G10N designation is a post-war extrapolation from the Japanese naming system and is sometimes still used incorrectly.

== Design and development ==
The Fugaku had its origins in "Project Z (bomber project)", a 1942 Imperial Japanese Army specification for an intercontinental bomber which could take off from the Kuril Islands, bomb the contiguous United States, then continue onward to land in German-occupied France. Once there, it would be refueled and rearmed and make another return sortie.

Project Z called for three variations on the airframe: heavy bomber, transport (capable of carrying 300 troops), and a gunship armed with forty downward-firing machine guns in the fuselage for intense ground attacks at the rate of 640 rounds per second (i.e. 38,400 rounds per minute).

The project was conceived by Nakajima Aircraft Company head Chikuhei Nakajima. The design had straight wings and contra-rotating four-blade propellers. To save weight, some of the landing gear was to be jettisoned after takeoff (being unnecessary on landing with emptied bomb load), as had been planned on some of the more developed German Amerika Bomber competing designs. It used six engines, as with the later Amerikabomber design competitors, to compensate for nearly all German aircraft engines being limited to 1,500 kW (2,000 hp) maximum output levels apiece.

Development was initiated in January 1943 and a design and manufacturing facility built in Mitaka, Tokyo. Nakajima's 4-row 36-cylinder 5,000 hp Ha-54 (Ha-505) engine was abandoned as too complex.

Project Z was cancelled in July 1944, and the Fugaku was never built.

== Operators (planned) ==
Japan

- Imperial Japanese Navy Air Service – (Fugaku)
- Imperial Japanese Army Air Force – (Project Z)

== Specifications (Project Z / Fugaku projected) ==
Data from Japanese Secret Projects:Experimental aircraft of the IJA and IJN 1939–1945

General characteristics

- Crew: 6 to 10 (Note: Fugaku: 7 to 8)
- Length: 44.98 m (147 ft 7 in) (Note: Fugaku: 39.98 m (131 ft))
- Wingspan: 64.98 m (213 ft 2 in) (Note: Fugaku: 62.97 m (207 ft))
- Height: 8.77 m (28 ft 9 in)
- Wing area: 352.01 m^{2} (3,789.0 sq ft) (Note: Fugaku: 330 m^{2} (3,552.09 sq ft))
- Aspect ratio: 12.1
- Empty weight: 65,000 kg (143,300 lb) (Note: Fugaku: 33,800 kg (74,516.24 lb))
- Gross weight: 122,000 kg (268,964 lb) (Note: Fugaku: 42,000 kg (92,594.15 lb))
- Max takeoff weight: 160,000 kg (352,740 lb) (Note: Fugaku: 70,000 kg (154,323.58 lb))
- Powerplant: 6 × Nakajima Ha-54 36-cyl. air-cooled radial piston engines, 3,700 kW (5,000 hp) each at take-off (Note: Fugaku: 6x Nakajima NK11A 18-cyl. air-cooled radial piston engines developing 2,500 hp (1,864 kW) at take-off)
- Propellers: 6-bladed contra-rotating constant speed propellers, 4.5 m (14 ft 9 in) diameter (Note: Fugaku: 4-bladed constant speed propellers 4.8 m (16 ft) diameter)

Performance

- Maximum speed: 679 km/h (422 mph, 367 kn) at 10,000 m (32,808 ft) (Note: Fugaku: 779 km/h (484 mph) at 10,000 m (32,808 ft))
- Range: 17,999 km (11,184 mi, 9,719 nmi) maximum (Note: Fugaku: 19,400 km (12,055 mi))
- Service ceiling: 15,000 m (49,000 ft)
- Wing loading: 456.99 kg/m^{2} (93.60 lb/sq ft) (Note: Fugaku: 211.89 m^{2} (43.4 lb/ft^{2})
- Power/mass: 0.103 kW/kg (0.063 hp/lb) (Note: Fugaku: 0.118 kW/kg (0.07 hp/lb))

Armament

- Guns: 4× 20mm Type 99 cannon
- Bombs: 20,000 kg (44,092 lb) of bombs

== See also ==
Aircraft of comparable role, configuration, and era

- Amerika Bomber
- Convair B-36
- Focke-Wulf Ta 400
- Heinkel He 277
- Junkers Ju 390
- Messerschmitt Me 264
- Nakajima G8N
- Northrop YB-35
- Victory Bomber
