= Junkers Ju 290 =

1942 multi-role military aircraft family by Junkers

Ju 290
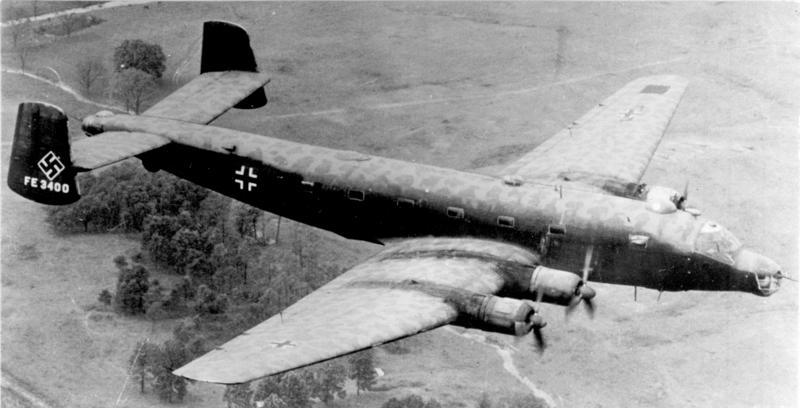
- Captured Ju 290A-7 in flight with American FE markings

General information
- Type: Maritime patrol, Transport, Heavy bomber
- Manufacturer: Junkers
- Designer: Konrad Eicholtz
- Primary users: Luftwaffe Spain (Post war)
- Number built: 65

History
- Manufactured: 1942–1946
- Introduction date: August 1942
- First flight: 16 July 1942 (Ju 290 V1)
- Developed from: Junkers Ju 90
- Variant: Junkers Ju 390

The Junkers Ju 290 was a large four-engine long-range transport and maritime patrol aircraft designed and produced by the German aircraft manufacturer Junkers.

Derived from the Ju 90 airliner, it was a dedicated military heavy transport developed on behalf of the Luftwaffe as a wartime replacement for Focke-Wulf Fw 200 Condor. In comparison to the standard Ju 90, it had a lengthened fuselage, more powerful engines, and a Trapoklappe - a hydraulically operated rear loading ramp. The Ju 290 initially flew unarmed; defensive machine guns were present on the majority of production aircraft following several early losses of aircraft. While originally designed for the heavy transport role, an urgent requirement for a long-range maritime reconnaissance aircraft led the Ju 290 being adapted to fulfil this mission as well. On 16 July 1942, the first prototype performed its maiden flight; the type was introduced to service shortly thereafter.

The Ju 290 was promptly deployed to bases in France for long-range reconnaissance missions in support of the ongoing Battle of the Atlantic; figures such as Admiral Karl Dönitz demanded that the entire output of Ju 290s be made available to support Germany's U-boat campaign against Allied shipping. Shortly after the Normandy landings, the type was withdrawn from France and reassigned to transport duties. The Luftwaffe's special operations squadron, KG 200 also flew the Ju 290 for espionage purposes. In early 1945, Adolf Hitler had a specially modified Ju 290 assigned for his personal use, although he never flew aboard it. There was also some considerations to adapting the Ju 290 for the Amerika Bomber initiative, cumulating in abortive work on experimental aerial refuelling apparatus for the type as well as the B-1 high-altitude heavy bomber variant. Furthermore, it was envisioned that the Ju 290 could be used to fly the long-distance route between Germany and Japan; it is contentious whether such flights actually ever occurred.

== Design and development ==
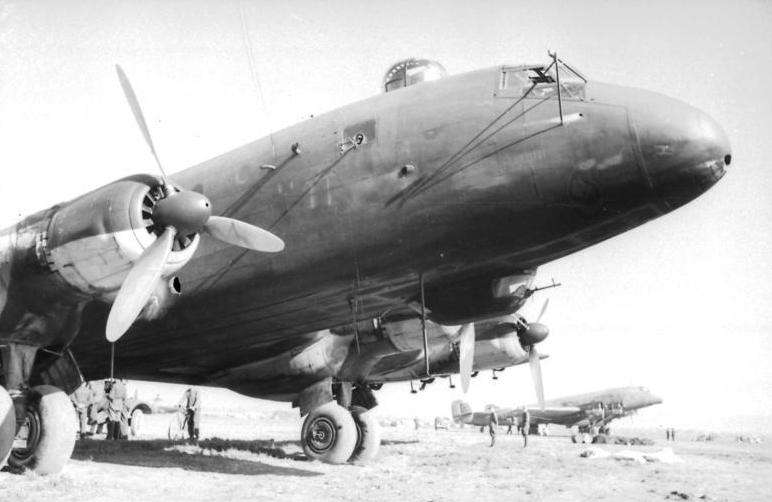
Nose of a Junkers 290 with a Junkers Ju 90 behind.

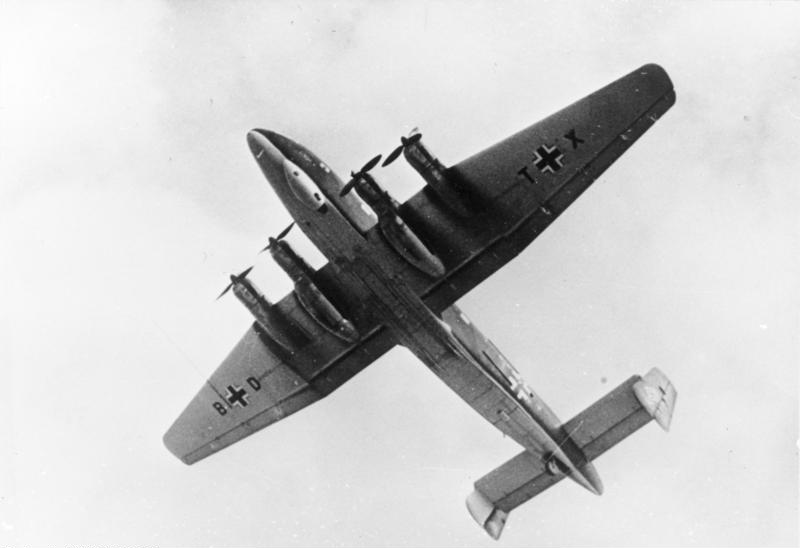
Underside of the Ju 290 V1, the first prototype.

The Junkers 290 was developed directly from the Ju 90 airliner, versions of which had been evaluated for military purposes, and was intended to replace the Luftwaffe's relatively slow Focke-Wulf Fw 200 Condor, which by 1942 was proving to be increasingly vulnerable when confronted with Royal Air Force aircraft. Furthermore, the airframe of the Fw 200 lacked sufficient strength for the role. Multiple roles for the aircraft were envisioned beyond that of a large transport aircraft; perhaps the most ambitious was a bomber version (referred to as the A-8) that was, while planned, never actually built. Work on the project originally began under the designation Ju 90S. Design work was headed by Konrad Eicholtz, the detailed design and production of the mock-ups was assigned to the Letov aircraft factory in Prague in 1939.

The development programme resulted in the Ju 290 V1 prototype BD+TX, which first flew on 16 July 1942. Two similar aircraft, designated Ju 290A-0, were completed that same year. In comparison with the Ju 90, it featured a lengthened fuselage, more powerful engines, and a Trapoklappe - a hydraulically operated rear loading ramp. A total of five Ju 290A-1s were produced in 1942, which was broadly similar to the Ju 290A-0 save for the addition of defensive armaments. This model was typically powered by four BMW 801L 14-cylinder radial engines, each capable of producing up to 1,200 kW (1,600 hp). The need for heavy transports led to the Ju 290A-1 being pressed into service as quickly as possibly.

An urgent need for Ju 290s in the long-range maritime reconnaissance role was also recognised by officials. This resulted in the development of the Ju 290A-2 during early 1943. Three A-1 aircraft were converted to A-2 standard while still on the assembly line; the range of modifications necessary, which included the installation of strong defensive armament, slowed production considerably. The A-2 was fitted with FuG 200 Hohentwiel low-UHF band search radar and a dorsal turret fitted with a 20 mm MG 151 cannon. The Hohentwiel radar was successfully used to locate Allied convoys at ranges of up to 80 km (50 mi) from an altitude of 500 m (1,600 ft) or 100 km (62 mi) from an altitude of 1,000 m (3,300 ft). It allowed the Ju 290 to track convoys while remaining out of range of anti-aircraft fire.

Early on, production of the Ju 290 was assigned to Junker's Bernburg facility. Later on, production lines were established at Letov's plant in Prague to manufacture most versions of the aircraft, commencing with the Ju 290A-2.

The Ju 290A-3 followed shortly after the A-2, the primary difference of this variant was the fitting of a low-drag rear dorsal turret along with more powerful BMW 801D engines, capable of producing up to 1,300 kW (1,700 hp). The A-3, along with the A-2, also featured large fuselage auxiliary fuel tanks. Both retained the rear loading ramp so that they could be used as transports if required.

The Ju 290A-4 was fitted with heavier defensive armament; specifically, a pair of hydraulically powered HDL 151 dorsal turrets armed with 20 mm MG 151 cannons along with a further 20 mm MG 151 and a 13 mm (.51 in) MG 131 machine gun fitted in a typically German Bola gondola (Note: The fitting of such gondolas was common to almost all German bomber aircraft of the Second World War.) directly underneath the forward dorsal gun turret, and a 20 mm MG 151 fitted in the tail operated by a gunner in a prone position. A pair of 13 mm (.51 in) MG 131s were also fitted in waist positions (Fensterlafetten).

The Ju 290A-5 featured a further increase in armour protection and the fitting of dual 13mm MG 131 in a rear-facing position in the gondola. It also had two dorsal turrets, operating either a 20mm MG 151/20 or a 15mm MG 151/15. The last A-5, W. Nr. 0180, carried two 20mm MG 151 cannon in lieu of the smaller MG 131. The Ju 290A-5 had the capability of launching guided munitions such as the Fritz X.

The Ju 290A-6 was a 50-passenger transport aircraft that was adapted for the personal use of Adolf Hitler.

The improved Ju 290A-7 version appeared in spring 1944 with 13 completed, of which 10 served with the long-range reconnaissance group, Fernaufklärungsgruppe (FAGr) 5. Some Ju 290A-7s and some Ju 290A-4s were fitted with a detachable nose turret armed with a 20 mm MG 151/20 for added defense against frontal attack. No bombs were carried, as it was intended that these models would be fitted with the FuG 203 Kehl radio guidance system to launch guided Fritz X and Hs 293 anti-ship glide bombs.

According to the aviation historian Manfred Griehl, starting in September 1944, an additional three Ju 290s were constructed for "special purposes" by Junkers. RLM records show that production of the Ju 290 was halted in mid-1944, so those Ju 290s might have been unfinished airframes, one of which became the Letov L.290 Orel.

During late 1943, work commenced on the Ju 290B-1, a high-altitude heavy bomber that was fully pressurised. Work on the B-1 was abandoned in favour of the improved Ju 290B-2; however, this remained under development by the end of the conflict.

== Operational history ==
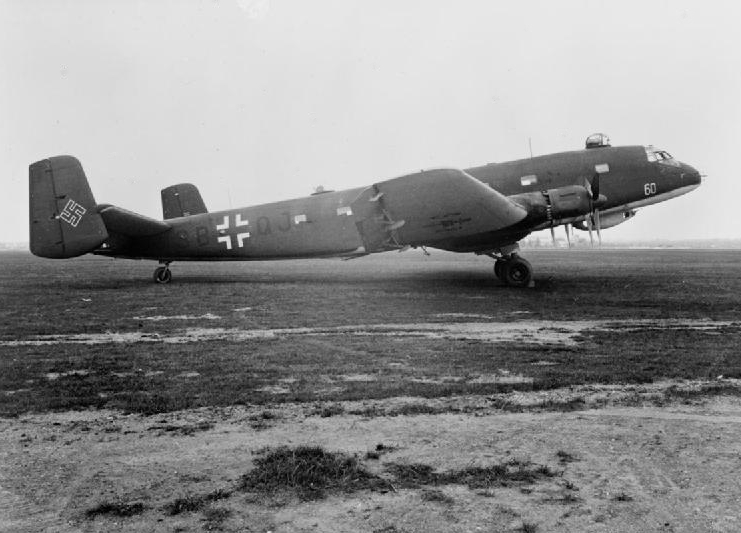
Operational maritime patrol Junker Ju 290A-3 used by FAGr 5 on the ground

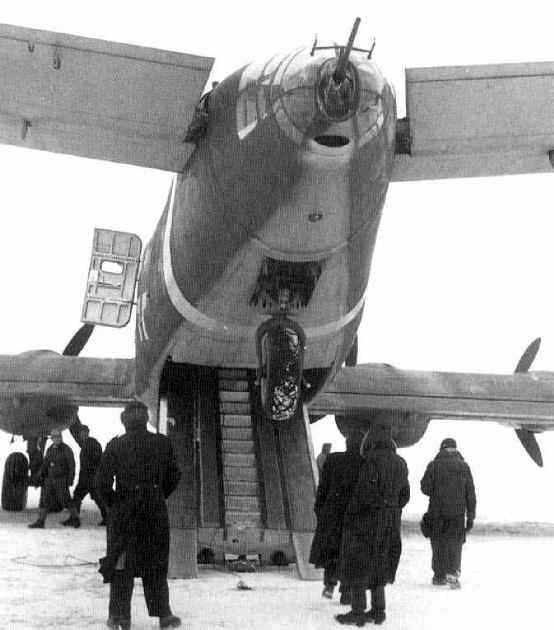
Rear view with extended Trapoklappe ramp

Several Ju 290s were lost in action during early 1943, including one on the Eastern Front while participating in the Stalingrad Airlift and two more while flying supplies to German forces in Tunisia.

A special long-range reconnaissance group, FAGr 5 (Fernaufklärungsgruppe 5), was formed on 1 July 1943 and, during the late summer of 1943, three of the new Ju 290A-2s were delivered to its 1 Staffel, which became operational at Mont-de-Marsan near Bordeaux on 15 October of that year. They flew their first operational missions in November 1943, shadowing Allied convoys in cooperation with U-boats, often remaining airborne for up to 18 hours at a time.

Five Ju 290A-3s equipped with more powerful BMW 801D engines in unitized mounts followed, as did five Ju 290A-4s armed with improved dorsal turrets mounting 20 mm MG 151/20s. The Ju 290s were well suited to their patrol role and began replacing the Fw 200 Condors. An A-4, Werk.Nummer. 0165, was experimentally equipped with attachments for Fritz X and either the Henschel Hs 293 or Hs 294 anti-ship weapons, and fitted with the FuG 203e Kehl radio control transmitter system for controlling any of them after release; it was surrendered to the US after the war and flown across the Atlantic to be studied.

In November 1943, a second Staffel was activated and, with a range of over 6,100 km (3,790 mi) the Ju 290s ranged far out over the Atlantic, relaying sightings of Allied convoys to U-boats. 11 Ju 290A-5s with increased armour, heavier armament and self-sealing fuel tanks were delivered to FAGr 5 early in 1944, as were around 12 of the Ju 290A-7 version; the A-7 could carry three Hs 293 glide bombs or Fritz X armoured, anti-warship remote controlled guided bombs when fitted with the FuG 203 Kehl radio guidance system for them, and featured a redesigned nose section which combined a 20 mm cannon installation with the FuG 200 radar aerial array.

Towards the end of 1943, Admiral Karl Dönitz demanded that the entire output of Ju 290s be made available for support of the German U-boat campaign. However, only 20 were assigned for this purpose. Even though both Hitler and Dönitz demanded an increase, the Luftwaffe General Staff declared it was unable to assign any more for naval reconnaissance purposes. The General Staff argued that there could be no increase in output so long as the Luftwaffe was not conceded "precedence in overall armaments".

In the spring of 1944, after Albert Speer had taken over the direction of air armaments, the Oberkommando der Luftwaffe (Luftwaffe High Command) boldly announced that production of the Ju 290 was to be suspended despite it being urgently needed for maritime reconnaissance; suspending production meant that resources could instead be diverted to building fighters. At that point in time, Speer's position was weak and Hermann Göring (head of the Luftwaffe) was trying to find allies to help him strip Speer of his power, and the Luftwaffe was not prepared to offer the Navy more than "goodwill".

On 26 May 1944, shortly after daybreak, a Hawker Sea Hurricane, piloted by Sub-lieutenant Burgham from the escort carrier HMS Nairana protecting a convoy, shot down Ju 290 (9V+FK) of FAGr 5 over the Bay of Biscay. The afternoon of the same day, Sub-lieutenants Mearns and Wallis attacked two more Ju 290s. Mearns shot down 9V+GK piloted by Kurt Nonneberg, which ditched in the sea. The other Ju 290 disappeared on fire into cloud and was assumed to have crashed.

As the Battle of the Atlantic swung irrevocably in favour of the Allies with the loss by the Germans of French bases in August 1944, FAGr 5 withdrew eastwards and the remaining Ju 290s were reassigned to transport duties, including service with KG 200, where they were used to drop agents behind enemy lines and other special missions.

Ju 290 A-5, works number 0178, D-AITR, Bayern of Luft Hansa flew to Barcelona on 5 April 1945, piloted by Captain Sluzalek. The aircraft suffered damage to its landing gear on landing and was repaired with parts brought from Germany by a Lufthansa Fw 200. It remained in Spain because the Spanish Government ordered that regular Luft Hansa flights on route K22 be terminated from 21 April and was turned over to the Spanish authorities.

=== Flights to Japan ===
Following the invasion of the Soviet Union in June 1941, plans were made to connect Germany and Japan by air using Luftwaffe aircraft modified for very long range flights. Commercial flights to the Far East by Lufthansa were no longer possible, and it had become too dangerous for ships or U-boats to make the trip by sea. Field Marshal Erhard Milch authorised a study into the feasibility of such direct flights. Various routes were considered, including departing from German-occupied Russia and Bulgaria. Nautsi, near Lake Inari in the north of Finland, was finally selected as the optimum starting point for a great circle route along the Arctic Ocean then across eastern Siberia, to refuel in Manchuria before completing the flight to Japan.

In 1943, the Ju 290 was selected for the flights and tests began in February 1944 of a Ju 290 A-5 (works number 0170, Stammkennzeichen factory code of KR+LA) loaded with 41 tonnes (45 tons) of fuel and cargo. Three Ju 290 A-9s (works numbers 0182, 0183 and 0185) were modified for long-range work at the Junkers factory in March 1943. The plan was eventually put on indefinite hold after the Japanese failed to agree on a route, as they did not want to provoke the Soviet Union by an overflight of Siberia, and the three aircraft were eventually transferred to KG 200 without any attempt at a long-range flight to Japan.

The idea for a flight to Japan was revived again in December 1944 to transport Luftwaffe General Ulrich Kessler to Japan as a replacement for the German air attaché in Tokyo. Ju 290 A-3, no. 0163, was flown to Travemünde for the necessary modifications, but the work was delayed and it was decided to send Kessler aboard the submarine U-234 instead. (Note: U-234 was enroute to Japan when Germany surrendered in May 1945 and the commander headed to the North American coast instead) The aircraft was destroyed on 3 May 1945 as British troops arrived. Some sources claim that the trip to Japan took place, departing from Odesa and Mielec and landing in Manchuria.

=== KG 200 ===
The Luftwaffe Special Operations squadron, KG 200 used the Ju 290 amongst its various aircraft types. On the night of 27 November 1944, KG 200 pilots Braun and Pohl flew a Ju 290 from Vienna to a position just south of Mosul, Iraq, where they successfully air-dropped five Iraqi parachutists; staging through the island of Rhodes, which was still under German occupation, they evacuated some thirty casualties from there to Vienna. The unit was also allegedly involved in the evacuation of key Nazi officials in the closing days of the Second World War.

== Variants ==
=== Hitler's personal transport ===
On 26 November 1943, Ju 290 A-5, no. 0170, along with many other new aircraft and prototypes, was shown to Adolf Hitler at Insterburg, East Prussia. Hitler was impressed by its potential and told Göring that he wanted a Ju 290 for his personal use. A Ju 290 was not however assigned to the Fliegerstaffel des Fuehrers (FdF) until late 1944, when an A-6 was supplied, works number 0192, which had formerly been assigned to FAGr 5. Modifications were completed by February 1945 at the FdF's base at Pocking, Bavaria, a Stammkennzeichen alphabetic designation code of KR+LW being applied. Hitler's pilot, Hans Baur, tested the aircraft, but Hitler never flew in it.

The aircraft was fitted with a special passenger compartment in the front of the aircraft for Hitler, which was protected by 12 mm (.5 in) armour plate and 50 mm (2 in) bulletproof glass. A special escape hatch was fitted in the floor and a parachute was built into Hitler's seat; in an emergency it was intended that he would put on the parachute, pull a lever to open the hatch, and roll out through the opening. This arrangement was tested using life-size mannequins.

Hans Baur flew the aircraft to Munich-Riem Airport on 24 March 1945, landing just as an air-raid alert was sounded. He went home after parking it in a hangar but on returning to the airport, he discovered that both hangar and aircraft had been destroyed by American bombers.

=== Ju 290Z Zwilling ===
Junkers project documents from 1942 to 1944 indicate that a Zwilling (German: 'twin') variant was proposed. It was to be composed of two Ju 290 fuselages powered by eight BMW 9-801 engines; two mounted on each outboard wing and four on the inboard wing. It was to carry a single Messerschmitt Me 328 jet parasite fighter on top of the starboard fuselage. The Ju 290Z was cancelled in favour of the Ju 390.

=== Amerika Bomber precursor ===
The long range of the Ju 290 made it a good candidate for further development of the Amerika Bomber project, competing with the airworthy prototype of the Messerschmitt Me 264, the unrealised Heinkel He 277 and Focke-Wulf Ta 400 designs, and as a result, the six-engined Ju 390, based directly on the Ju 290 airframe with even longer range was built in prototype form, two airframes being completed and test-flown. The Ju 290 itself was under consideration to serve as a tanker to refuel the Messerschmitt entry in the Amerika Bomber design competition. In late 1942 Field Marshal Milch ordered that the possibility of increasing the fuel capacity of the Ju 290 to enable it to perform the Amerika Bomber mission itself.

The drawbacks were twofold, chiefly being that the initial rate of climb would be very poor, and that the fully loaded airplane could only operate out of two airfields in France. A lightened Ju 290E subtype was proposed in March 1943, but remained on paper. The Ju 390 at its gross weight required a tow to take off. Initially, a He 111Z was tried but the Ju 390 was predicted might be unstable in such an instance so plans were changed to use two Ju 290s instead. During May 1942, engineers at Junkers had done calculations to investigate the possibility of refuelling the Ju 390 in flight from a Ju 290, something that had been proposed earlier for the same sort of duty to support the initial high-altitude version of the rival Heinkel He 177A, the proposed A-2 subtype – with such capability, the range of the He 177A-2 would have been extendable to some 9,500 km (5,900 mi) of total flight distance.

By March 1943, consideration of using a Ju 290 to refuel another was made and the result was to see up to four Ju 290s converted to tankers or long range bombers. Tanker/receiver experiments continued in early 1944, when two Ju 290 A-2s were tested under operational conditions from Mont de Marsan in France. As Germany lost access to the ocean — and the cancellation of both the He 277 on Hitler's 55th birthday, followed by the Me 264's cancellation on 23 September 1944; the America Bomber role soon evaporated, and by October 1944, all production was stopped. Both the Ju 290A-8 and Ju 390A-1 were each intended to use two of the under-development, Borsig-designed Hecklafette HL 131V quadmount tail turrets (each armed with four Rheinmetall-Borsig MG 131 machine guns apiece), with one turret in its originally intended role for rearwards defence and one in the nose adapted for forward defence.

== Post-war use ==
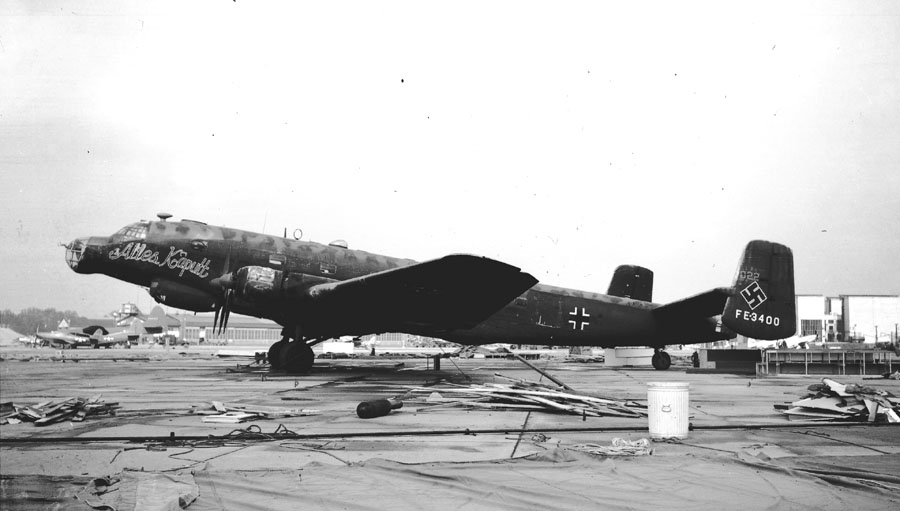
Alles Kaputt on display in the US, October 1945

A number of Ju 290s survived the war, the Allies evaluating at least three examples, none of which was known to have survived intact into the 21st century.

- Ju 290 A-4 no. 0165, which had been equipped with attachments for Fritz X, Hs 293, and Hs 294 ordnance and the FuG 203e Kehl radio guidance gear, was surrendered to the U.S. Renamed Alles Kaputt, and numbered FE 3400, it was flown to the US by Colonel Harold E. Watson from Orly, Paris to Wright Field on 28 July 1945, via the Azores. The captured aircraft, with its Nazi insignia repainted, was a frequent performer at air shows at Freeman Field and Wright Field. When the aircraft was scrapped at Wright Field in 1946, a plastic explosive device of German manufacture was discovered in the wing near to a fuel tank.
- An A-5 (Wk. no. 0178), Bayern of Luft Hansa, which had been interned at Barcelona, was acquired by the Spanish and was eventually used by the Spanish Air Force from 29 April 1950 to 27 July 1956 as a government transport of personnel for the Superior School of Flight in Salamanca. Following an accident, it was scrapped due to a lack of spare parts in May 1957.
- A final Ju 290 was built by the Letov Kbely aircraft company in Czechoslovakia in 1946, using parts intended for the Ju 290 B-1 high-altitude prototype. It was completed as a transport with capacity for either 40 or 48 passengers (sources vary), and designated Letov L-290 "Orel" ('eagle'). It was offered as an airliner but was not adopted because it lacked the appropriate internal equipment, and the BMW engines were not available in sufficient numbers.

== Operators ==
Czechoslovakia

- Czech Airlines operated one aircraft postwar as Letov L.290 Orel.

Nazi Germany

- Luftwaffe
- Deutsche Luft Hansa

Spanish State

- Spanish Air Force operated 1 ex-Luftwaffe aircraft postwar.

== Specifications (Ju 290 A-5) ==
Data from Junkers Aircraft and engines, 1913–1945, German aircraft of the Second World War, The Warplanes of the Third Reich

General characteristics

- Crew: nine
- Length: 28.64 m (94 ft 0 in)
- Wingspan: 42 m (137 ft 10 in)
- Height: 6.83 m (22 ft 5 in)
- Wing area: 205.3 m^{2} (2,210 sq ft)
- Empty weight: 24,000 kg (52,911 lb)
- Gross weight: 40,970 kg (90,323 lb)
- Max takeoff weight: 44,969 kg (99,140 lb)
- Powerplant: 4 × BMW 801G 14-cylinder air-cooled radial piston engines, 1,300 kW (1,700 hp) each for take-off

1,080 kW (1,450 hp) at 2,000 m (6,560 ft)
980 kW (1,310 hp) at 5,800 m (19,030 ft)

- Propellers: 3-bladed constant-speed propellers

Performance

- Maximum speed: 439 km/h (273 mph, 237 kn) at 5,800 m (19,030 ft)
- Cruise speed: 360.5 km/h (224.0 mph, 194.7 kn) at 5,800 m (19,030 ft)
- Range: 6,148 km (3,820 mi, 3,320 nmi) with 21,003 L (5,548 US gal; 4,620 imp gal)
- Service ceiling: 6,000 m (19,685 ft)
- Time to altitude: 1,860 m (6,090 ft) in nine minutes and 48 seconds at 90,323 lb (40,970 kg)

Armament

- Guns: ** 2 × 20 mm (0.787 in) MG 151/20 cannons or MG 151/15 cannon in dorsal turrets
  - 1 × 20 mm (0.787 in) MG 151/20 in tail
  - 2 × 13 mm (0.512 in) MG 131 machine guns in waist
  - 1 × 20 mm (0.787 in) MG 151/20 or 1 x 30 mm (1.181 in) MK 103 cannon in front gondola
  - 2 × 13 mm (0.512 in) MG 131 machine guns in rear gondola
- Bombs: Up to 3,000 kg (6,600 lb) of disposable stores or three Fritz X, F5W torpedoes or Henschel Hs 293 radio-guided munitions, though these were not widely used

Avionics

- Radar: FuG 200 Hohentwiel

== See also ==
Related development

- Junkers Ju 89
- Junkers Ju 90
- Junkers Ju 390

Aircraft of comparable role, configuration, and era

- Consolidated B-24 Liberator
- Focke-Wulf Fw 200 Condor
- Nakajima G8N

Related lists

- List of bomber aircraft
- List of military aircraft of Germany
- List of World War II military aircraft of Germany
