= Focke-Wulf Fw 300 =

Proposed German long-range plane

Fw 300
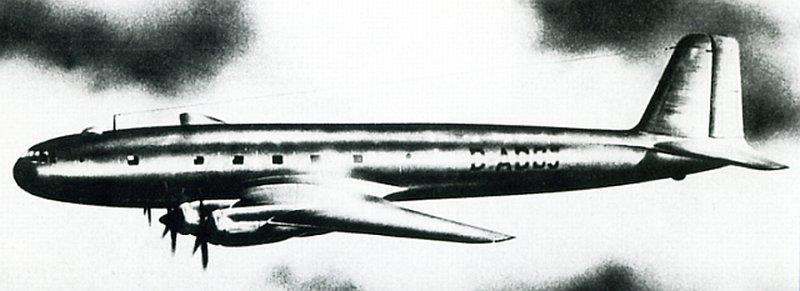

General information
- Type: Civil airliner, transport, reconnaissance
- Manufacturer: Focke-Wulf
- Designer: Kurt Tank
- Status: proposal
- Primary user: Luftwaffe (intended)
- Number built: 0

History
- Developed from: Focke-Wulf Fw 200

The Focke-Wulf Fw 300 was a proposed very-long-range civil airliner, transport, reconnaissance aircraft and anti-ship aircraft, designed by Focke-Wulf in 1941 and 1942. The design was intended to replace the Focke-Wulf Fw 200 Condor.

== Design and development ==
The proposed Fw 300 had an all-metal airframe, a low-wing cantilever configuration, and a pressurized fuselage, possessing a smoothly contoured forward fuselage and nose, somewhat reminiscent of the Boeing 307 Stratoliner airliner in shape. Space was provided for up to 50 passengers in individual compartments. The landing gear was retractable. Four wing-mounted piston engines were proposed to drive the aircraft. Two engine candidates were:

- The Junkers Jumo 222, a 24-cylinder "multibank" inline engine (six inline banks of four cylinders each, arranged at 60° intervals around the crankcase), rated at 1,864 kW (2,500 hp), which in the event never proceeded to the production stage during the course of the war with just under 300 examples built in several different versions;
- The Daimler-Benz DB 603, a 12-cylinder inverted-V engine rated at 1,342 kW (1,800 hp) and the largest displacement inverted-V12 aviation powerplant built by Germany in World War II.

Both engines were liquid-cooled.

In the proposed military configuration, the eight-man crew was to have been enclosed in one pressure cabin, and the defensive gun armament operated remotely. For anti-ship missions, it would have carried guided missiles.

Design work continued during the first years of the war, but was shelved as the need for long-range bombers or other long-range efforts diminished and other priorities emerged. Construction of a prototype was never started.

== Specifications (proposed) ==
General characteristics

- Crew: eight
- Length: 32.2 m (105 ft 8 in)
- Wingspan: 46.2 m (151 ft 7 in)
- Height: 5.6 m (18 ft 4 in)
- Wing area: 277 m^{2} (2,980 sq ft)
- Gross weight: 47,500 kg (104,720 lb)
- Powerplant: 4 × Junkers Jumo 9-222 24-cyl. 6-bank inline liquid-cooled piston engines, 1,864 kW (2,500 hp) each

or 4 × 1,324 kW (1,776 hp) Daimler-Benz DB 603E inverted V-12 liquid-cooled piston engines

Performance

- Maximum speed: 635 km/h (395 mph, 343 kn)
- Range: 9,000 km (5,600 mi, 4,900 nmi)

Armament

- Guns: * 12 × 20 mm MG 151/20 cannon in six twin turrets

== See also ==
Related development

- Focke-Wulf Fw 200
- Focke-Wulf Ta 400

Aircraft of comparable role, configuration, and era

- Junkers Ju 290

Related lists

- List of World War II military aircraft of Germany
- List of military aircraft of Germany
