= Amerikabomber =

WWII German projects for long-range bomber aircraft

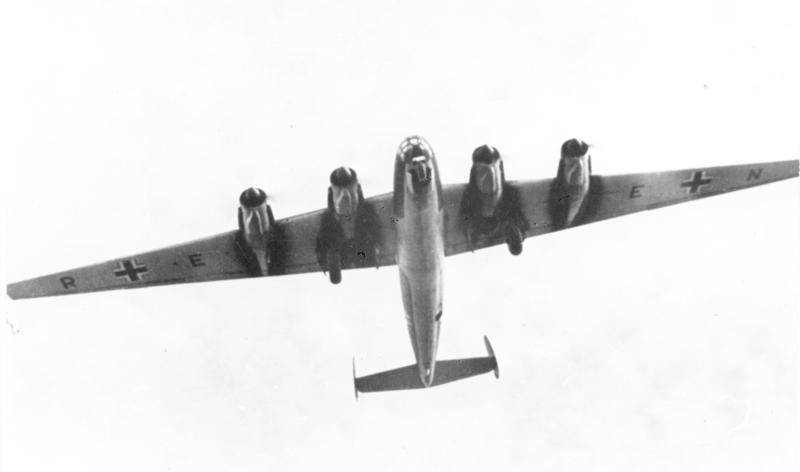
- The Messerschmitt Me 264 V1 (first prototype Me 264)

General information
- Project for: Long-range strategic bomber
- Issued by: Reich Air Ministry
- Service: Luftwaffe
- Proposals: Focke-Wulf, Heinkel, Junkers, and Messerschmitt (conventional bombers)
- Prototypes: Focke-Wulf Ta 400; Heinkel He 277 (after February 1943); Junkers Ju 390; Messerschmitt Me 264.

History
- Initiated: April 1942
- Concluded: July 1944, with the Jägernotprogramm.
- Outcome: Five prototypes (two Ju 390, three Me 264) built, no operational aircraft
- Predecessors: Ural bomber

The Amerikabomber (lit. 'America bomber') project was an initiative of the German Ministry of Aviation (German: Reichsluftfahrtministerium) to obtain a long-range strategic bomber for the Luftwaffe that would be capable of striking the United States (specifically New York City) from Germany, a round-trip distance of about 11,600 km (7,200 mi).

A Focke-Wulf Fw 200 Condor of the Luft Hansa made a direct flight from Berlin to New York in August 1938. The Amerikabomber concept was raised in the same year, but advanced plans for such a long-range strategic bomber design were not presented to Reichsmarschall Hermann Göring until early 1942. Various proposals were put forward, but these plans were all eventually abandoned as they were too expensive, too reliant on rapidly diminishing matériel and production capacity, and technically infeasible.

== Background ==
According to Albert Speer's book, Spandau: The Secret Diaries, Adolf Hitler was fascinated with the idea of New York City in flames. In 1937, Willy Messerschmitt hoped to win a lucrative contract by showing Hitler a prototype of the Messerschmitt Me 264 that was being designed to reach North America from Europe. On 8 July 1938, barely two years after the death of Germany's main strategic bombing advocate, Generalleutnant Walter Wever, and eight months after the Reich Air Ministry awarded the contract for the design of the Heinkel He 177, Germany's only operational heavy bomber during the war years, the Luftwaffe's commander-in-chief Hermann Göring gave a speech saying, "I completely lack the bombers capable of round-trip flights to New York with a 4.5-tonne bomb load. I would be extremely happy to possess such a bomber, which would at last stuff the mouth of arrogance across the sea."

Canadian historian Holger H. Herwig claims the plan started as a result of discussions by Hitler in November 1940 and May 1941 when he stated his need to "deploy long-range bombers against American cities from the Azores." Due to their location, he thought the Portuguese Azores islands were Germany's "only possibility of carrying out aerial attacks from a land base against the United States." Nazi Germany had failed to complete any aircraft carriers during its rapid interwar rearmament due to a lack of industrial and labour capacity. At the time, Portuguese Prime Minister Salazar had allowed German U-boats and navy ships to refuel there, but from 1943 onwards, he leased bases in the Azores to the British, allowing the Allies to provide aerial coverage in the middle of the Atlantic.

Requests for designs, at various stages during the war, were made to the major German aircraft manufacturers (Messerschmitt, Junkers, Focke-Wulf and the Horten Brothers) early in World War II, coinciding with the passage of the Destroyers for Bases Agreement between the United States and the United Kingdom in September 1940. Heinkel's bid for the project had occurred sometime shortly after February 1943, by which time the RLM had issued the Heinkel firm the airframe type number 8-277 for what essentially became its entry.

== Plan ==
The Amerikabomber project plan was completed on April 27, 1942, and submitted to Reichsmarschall Hermann Göring on May 12, 1942. The 33-page plan was discovered in Potsdam by Olaf Groehler, a German historian. Ten copies of the plan were made, with six going to different Luftwaffe offices and four held in reserve. The plan specifically mentions using the Azores as a transit airfield to reach the United States. If used, the Heinkel He 277, Junkers Ju 390, and the Messerschmitt Me 264 could reach American targets with a 3, 5 and 6.5 tonnes (6,600, 11,000 and 14,300 lb) payload respectively. Although it is apparent that the plan itself deals only with an attack on American soil, it is possible the Nazis saw other interrelated strategic purposes for the Amerikabomber project. According to military historian James P. Duffy, Hitler "saw in the Azores the ... possibility for carrying out aerial attacks from a land base against the United States ... [which in turn would] force it to build up a large antiaircraft defense." The anticipated result would have been to force the United States to use more of its antiaircraft capabilities—guns and fighter planes—for its own defense rather than for that of Great Britain, thereby allowing the Luftwaffe to attack the latter country with less resistance.

Partly as a liaison with the Wehrmacht Heer, in May 1942 Generalfeldmarschall Erhard Milch requested the opinion of Generalmajor Eccard Freiherr von Gablenz on the new proposal, with regard to the aircraft available to fill the needs of an Amerikabomber, which had then included the Me 264, Fw 300 and the Ju 290. von Gablenz gave his opinion on the Me 264, as it was in the second half of 1942, before von Gablenz's own commitments in the Battle of Stalingrad occurred: the Me 264 could not be usefully equipped for a true trans-Atlantic bomber mission from Europe, but it would be useful for a number of very long-range maritime patrol duties in co-operation with the Kriegsmarine's U-boats off the US East Coast.

== Design ==
=== Conventional bombers ===
The most promising proposals were based on conventional principles of aircraft design, and would have yielded aircraft very similar in configuration and capability to the Allied heavy bombers of the day. These would have needed ultra-long range capability similar to the Messerschmitt Me 261 maritime reconnaissance design, the longest-ranged intended design actually flown during the Third Reich's existence. Many of the developed designs, themselves first submitted during 1943 suggested tricycle landing gear for their undercarriage, a relatively new feature for large German military aircraft designs of that era. These included the following concepts:

- Messerschmitt Me 264 (an all-new design, and the first one built and flown, submitted in May 1942),
- Focke-Wulf Ta 400,
- Junkers Ju 390 (based on the Ju 290, the second and last built and flown, with the Ju 290 itself submitted in May 1942),
- Heinkel He 277 (as it underwent ongoing engineering development through 1943, itself first specified by its RLM airframe number by February 1943).

Three prototypes of the Me 264 were built, but it was the Ju 390 that was selected for production. A verified pair of the Ju 390 design were constructed before the program was abandoned. After World War II, several authors claimed that the second Ju 390 actually made a transatlantic flight, coming within 20 km (12 mi) of the northeast US coast in early 1944, but this claim has since been discredited as Ju 390 V2 never flew. As both the Me 264 and He 277 were each intended to be four-engined bombers from their origins, the troubling situation of being unable to develop combat-reliable piston aviation engines of 1,500 kW (2,000 hp) and above output levels led to both designs being considered for six-engined upgrades, with Messerschmitt's paper project for a 47.5-metre (156 ft) wingspan "Me 264B" airframe upgrade to use six BMW 801E radials, and the Heinkel firm's July 23, 1943-dated request from the RLM to propose a 45-metre (148 ft) wingspan, six-engined variant of the still-unfinalized He 277 airframe design that could alternatively accommodate four of the troublesome, over 1,500 kW (2,000 hp) output apiece Junkers Jumo 222 24-cylinder six-bank liquid-cooled engines, or two additional BMW 801E radials beyond the four it was originally meant to use. July 23, 1943, was the same day that the USAAF submitted a "letter of intent" to Convair, that ordered the first 100 production Convair B-36 bombers to be built—itself a design first asked for by the earlier USAAC on April 11, 1941—an enormous six-engined, 70-metre (230 ft) wingspan design far superior to either the Heinkel He 277 or Focke-Wulf Ta 400 designs.

=== Huckepack Projekt (Piggyback Project) ===
One idea similar to Mistel-Gespann was to have a Heinkel He 177 bomber carry a Dornier Do 217, powered with an additional Lorin-Staustrahltriebwerk (Lorin-ramjet), as far as possible over the Atlantic before releasing it. For the Do 217 it would have been a one-way trip. The aircraft would be ditched off the east coast, and its crew would be picked up by a waiting U-boat. When plans had advanced far enough, the lack of fuel and the loss of the base at Bordeaux prevented a test. The project was abandoned after the forced move to Istres increased the distance too much.

The Huckepack Projekt was brought up again at multiple joint conferences between the Luftwaffe and Kriegsmarine. After a few weeks the plan was abandoned on August 21, 1942. Air Staff General Kreipe wrote in his diary that the German navy could not supply a U-boat off the United States to pick up the aircrew. The plan saw no further development, since the Kriegsmarine would not cooperate with the Luftwaffe.

=== Other designs ===
Other designs were rockets with wings. Perhaps the best-known of these today is Eugen Sänger's pre-war Silbervogel ("Silverbird") sub-orbital bomber.

== Potential targets ==
Included in the plan was a list of 21 targets of military importance in North America. Many of these would not have been viable targets for conventional bombers of World War II, operating from bases in Europe. Of these targets, primarily but not exclusively located in the eastern United States, 19 were located in the United States; one in Vancouver, British Columbia, Canada (a possibly achievable target for a similar Japanese project) and one in Greenland. Nearly all were companies that manufactured parts for aircraft, so the goal was likely to cripple US aircraft production.

- Allis-Chalmers in La Porte, Indiana
- Allison Division of General Motors in Indianapolis, Indiana
- Aluminum Company of America in Alcoa, Tennessee; Massena, New York; Badin, North Carolina; and Vancouver, British Columbia
- American Car & Foundry in Berwick, Pennsylvania
- Bausch & Lomb in Rochester, New York
- Chrysler Corp. in Detroit, Michigan
- Colt Manufacturing in Hartford, Connecticut
- Corning Glass Works in Corning, New York
- Cryolite Refinery in Pittsburgh, Pennsylvania, and Cryolite Mine in Arsuk, Greenland
- Curtiss Wright Corp. in Beaver, Pennsylvania; Buffalo, New York; and Caldwell, New Jersey
- Hamilton Standard Corp. in East Hartford, Connecticut, and Pawcatuck, Connecticut
- Pratt & Whitney Aircraft in East Hartford, Connecticut
- Sperry Gyroscope in Brooklyn, New York
- Fellows Gear Shaper, Springfield, Vermont.

== Feasibility and consequences ==
Were New York City to be bombed, the required combat radius was 11,680 kilometres (7,260 mi), as the bomber would have needed to make a return trip without refueling. The only German aircraft already built and flown that had a range close to this was the Messerschmitt Me 261 Adolfine, with a maximum range of 11,025 kilometres (6,850 mi).

Had sufficient time and resources been devoted to the project at a point in time early enough, an Amerikabomber may have become operational before the war's end. However, as historian James P. Duffy pointed out, Nazi Germany had no central authority for the development and construction of advanced weaponry, including new aircraft concepts and designs, as well as critical problems in developing high-powered aviation engines – that is, with output of over 1,500 kW (2,000 hp) each, which could operate reliably in combat conditions – that would have been required. Hitler was often swayed to waste time, money and resources on new "miracle weapons" and other projects that were unlikely to be successful. The Amerikabomber project was not one of the projects so favored. In addition, Allied bombing became so intense during the middle of the war that it disrupted critical German supply chains, particularly fuel; in addition, ever-greater proportions of resources were reserved for home defense purposes. German scientists were forced more and more to compete for ever scarcer resources. Together, all of the above political and strategic constraints made construction of such an aircraft increasingly less likely.

It was unlikely that any damage caused to targets in North America, by the relatively small conventional bomb loads that could be delivered by such an ultra-long-range bomber, would be significant enough to justify the loss of such a bomber. Nazi Germany's nuclear programme was years behind the Allies, and did not include weapons in the form of aerial bombs, so it was unlikely that the Amerikabomber could have made a major difference to the outcome of the war.

Ultimately, all of the aircraft designs under consideration were deemed too expensive or ambitious and were abandoned. Post-war, however, they continued to be of interest to aerospace engineers:

- the British Air Ministry considered development of the Horten H.XVIII as an airliner, and;
- the theoretical groundwork done on the Sänger Silbervogel would prove seminal to lifting body designs in the space age – one of the designs for the Amerikabomber would use a concept similar to a space shuttle.

== See also ==
- A9/A10 — Aggregat series multistage rocket design intended to reach North America
- Hughes H-4 Hercules — American prototype flying boat intended for transatlantic transport, conceived in the context of World War II-era strategic doctrine
- Lookout Air Raids, the only direct Axis air attack on the continental United States
- Northrop YB-35 and Convair B-36 — American long-range World War II-era-conceived, piston-engined heavy bomber designs meant to reach Germany directly from North America.
- Project Z, Japanese proposals that paralleled the Amerikabomber
  - Nakajima Fugaku design, a Japanese bomber capable of attacking continental North America, of this project
- Nazi plans for North America
