= Project Z (bomber project) =

Military project of the Empire of Japan

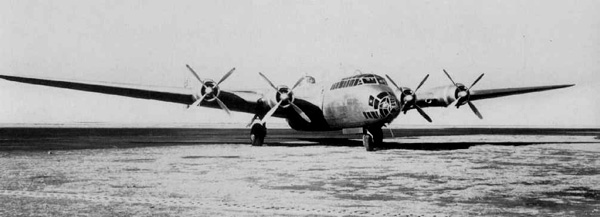
- The G5N Shinzan, one of the aircraft built to meet the project's requirements

General information
- Project for: Long-range strategic bomber
- Service: Imperial Japanese Army
- Proposals: Nakajima Fugaku; Kawasaki Ki-91; Kawanishi H8K conversion
- Prototypes: Nakajima G5N Shinzan

Project Z (also called the "Z Bombers Project") was a military project of the Empire of Japan, similar to the Nazi German Amerikabomber project, to design an intercontinental bomber capable of reaching North America.

== The planned aircraft ==
The Project Z aircraft was to have six 5,000 hp (3,700 kW) engines; the Nakajima Aircraft Company quickly began developing engines, proposing twinned Nakajima Ha-44 engines (the most powerful aircraft engine available in Japan at the time).

Designs were presented to the Imperial Japanese Army, including the

- Nakajima G5N Shinzan, with 6 prototypes built;
- Conversion of the Kawanishi H8K (sometime wrongly designated G9K Gunzan), concept only;
- Nakajima Fugaku (sometime wrongly designated G10N), project only;
- Kawasaki Ki-91, scale model only.

None, save for the G5N, developed beyond prototypes or wind tunnel models. Late in the war, Project Z and other heavy bomber projects were cancelled.

== See also ==
- Amerikabomber
- American Theater (World War II)
