= Nakajima G8N Renzan =

1944 bomber aircraft family by Nakajima

G8N Renzan
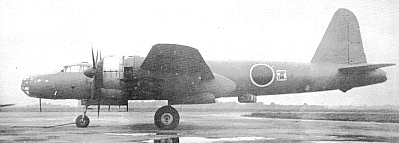

General information
- Type: Heavy bomber
- National origin: Japan
- Manufacturer: Nakajima Aircraft Company
- Status: retired
- Primary user: Imperial Japanese Navy Air Service
- Number built: 4

History
- Introduction date: 1945
- First flight: 23 October 1944
- Retired: August 1945

The Nakajima G8N Renzan (連山, Mountain Range) was a four-engined, long-range bomber designed for use by the Imperial Japanese Navy. The Navy full designation was "Type 18 land-based attack aircraft" (十八試陸上攻撃機), while its Allied reporting name was "Rita".

== Design and development ==
In February 1943, the Imperial Navy staff asked Nakajima Aircraft Company to design a four-engined bomber, capable of meeting an earlier specification set for a long-range, land-based attack plane. The final specification, issued on 14 September 1943, called for a plane with a maximum speed of 320 knots (590 km/h; 370 mph) able to carry a 4,000 kg (8,800 lb) bomb-load 2,000 nmi (3,700 km; 2,300 mi) or a reduced bomb-load 4,000 nmi (7,400 km; 4,600 mi).

Nakajima's design featured a mid-mounted wing of small area and high aspect ratio, a tricycle landing gear, and a large single-fin rudder. Power came from four 2,000 hp Nakajima NK9K-L "Homare" 24 radial engines with Hitachi 92 turbosuperchargers driving four-bladed propellers. The engines were cooled by counter-rotating fans positioned just inside the engine cowlings. Defensive armament included power-operated nose, dorsal, ventral, and tail turrets, along with two free-swiveling machine guns at the beam positions.

== Operational history ==
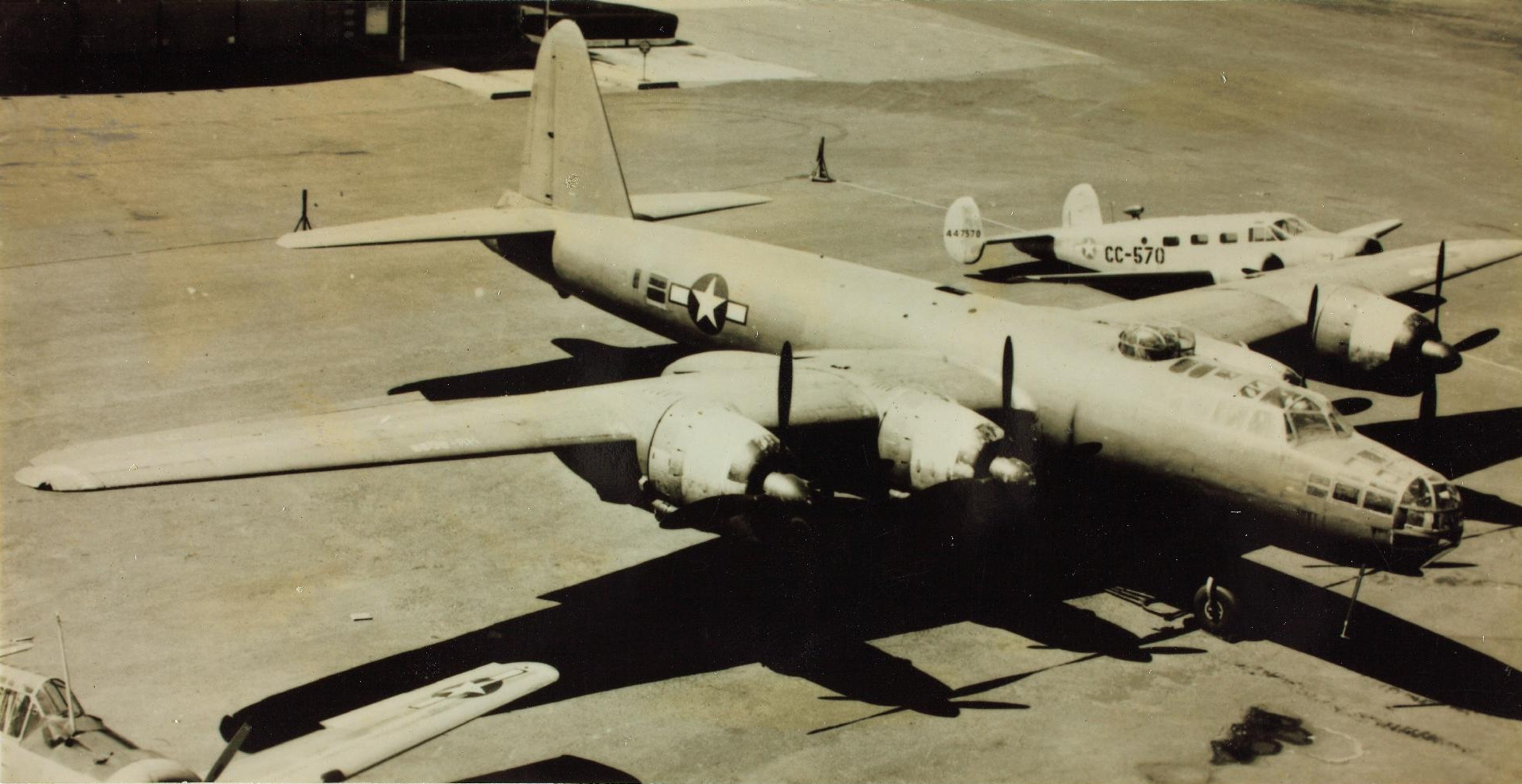
A captured G8N painted in United States Army Air Forces markings with a C-45 and T-6

The initial prototype was completed in October 1944 and delivered to the Navy for testing in January 1945, a year after the Navy ordered development to start. Three further examples were completed by June 1945, with the third prototype being destroyed on the ground by US carrier aircraft.

Other than minor problems with the turbosuperchargers, the Renzan performed satisfactorily, and the Navy hoped to have a total of sixteen prototypes and 48 production-version G8N1s assembled by September 1945. However, the worsening War situation and a critical shortage of light aluminium alloys led to the project's cancellation in June.

One proposed variant was the G8N2 Renzan-Kai Model 22, powered by four 2,200 hp Mitsubishi MK9A radial engines and modified to accept attachment of the air-launched Ohka Type 33 Special Attack Bomber.

Just before Japan's surrender in August 1945, consideration was also briefly given to producing an all-steel version of the aircraft to be designated G8N3 Renzan-Kai Model 23, but the cessation of hostilities precluded any further development.

After the War, one prototype was taken to the United States and scrapped after testing. None are in existence today.

== Variants ==
A Nakajima G8N1 (left) and a G5N1 (right) photographed by an American reconnaissance flight.

G8N1 Renzan
Four-engine heavy bomber. Production version. Four built.
G8N2 Renzan Kai Model 22
Modified to carry Ohka Type 33 Special Attack Bomber. Four Mitsubishi MK9A radial engines.
G8N3 Renzan Kai Model 23
All-steel airframe - never produced.

== Operators ==
Japan

- Imperial Japanese Navy Air Service
  - Naval Air Technical Arsenal (and after february 1945, reorganised to 1st Naval Technical Arsenal)

== Specifications (G8N1) ==

Data from Japanese Aircraft of the Pacific War

General characteristics

- Crew: 10
- Length: 22.935 m (75 ft 3 in)
- Wingspan: 32.54 m (106 ft 9 in)
- Height: 7.2 m (23 ft 7 in)
- Wing area: 112 m^{2} (1,210 sq ft)
- Airfoil: root: K251; tip: K159
- Empty weight: 17,400 kg (38,360 lb)
- Gross weight: 26,800 kg (59,084 lb)
- Max takeoff weight: 32,150 kg (70,879 lb)
- Powerplant: 4 × Nakajima NK9K-L Homare 24 18-cylinder air-cooled radial piston engines, 1,500 kW (2,000 hp) each for take-off

1,380 kW (1,850 hp) at 8,000 m (26,000 ft)

- Propellers: 4-bladed constant-speed metal propellers

Performance

- Maximum speed: 593 km/h (368 mph, 320 kn) at 8,000 m (26,000 ft)
- Cruise speed: 370 km/h (230 mph, 200 kn) at 4,000 m (13,000 ft)
- Range: 3,945 km (2,451 mi, 2,130 nmi)
- Ferry range: 7,464 km (4,638 mi, 4,030 nmi)
- Service ceiling: 10,200 m (33,500 ft)
- Time to altitude: 8,000 m (26,000 ft) in 17 minutes 34 seconds
- Wing loading: 239.3 kg/m^{2} (49.0 lb/sq ft)
- Power/mass: 0.2191 kW/kg (0.1333 hp/lb)

Armament

- Guns:
  - 6× 20 mm Type 99 cannon - 2 each in the dorsal, ventral, and tail turrets
  - 2× 13 mm (.51 in) Type 2 machine guns in nose turret
  - 2× 13 mm (.51 in) Type 2 machine gun in fuselage sides
- Bombs:
  - 2x 2,000 kg (4,409 lb) bombs - maximum
  - 4x 250 kg (551 lb) bombs - normal

== See also ==
Aircraft of comparable role, configuration, and era

- Avro Lincoln
- Boeing B-29 Superfortress
- Consolidated B-32 Dominator
- Focke-Wulf Fw 191C
- Heinkel He 177B
- Junkers Ju 290
- Martin XB-33A Super Marauder
- Petlyakov Pe-8
