= MG 131 machine gun =

WWII-era German aircraft heavy machine gun

MG 131
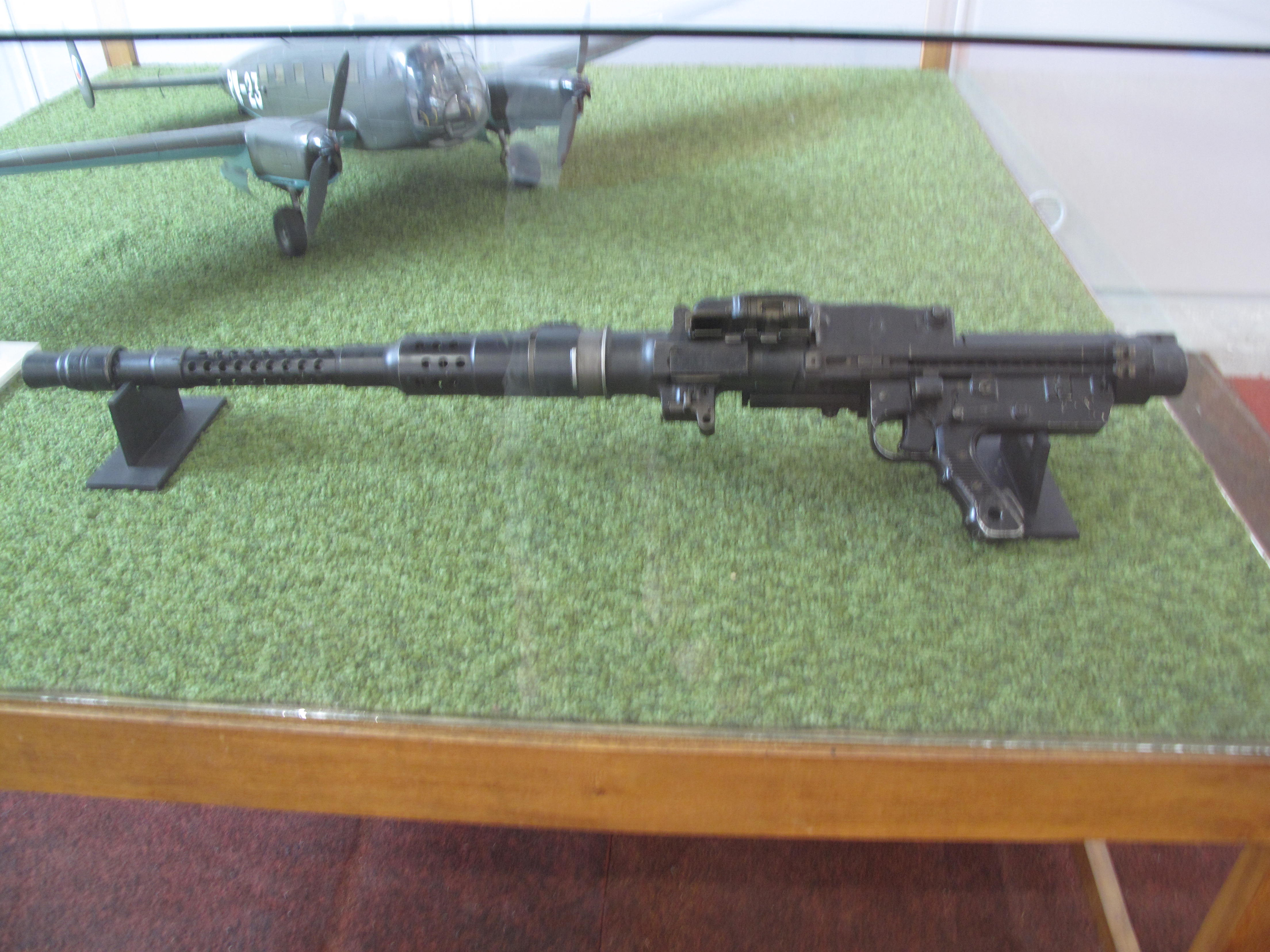
- Maschinengewehr 131
- Type: Heavy machine gun
- Place of origin: Nazi Germany

Service history
- In service: 1940–1945
- Used by: Germany
- Wars: World War II

Production history
- Designed: 1938
- Manufacturer: Rheinmetall-Borsig
- Produced: 1940–1945
- Variants: MG 131E (prototype for ground use; never adopted)

Specifications
- Mass: 16.6 kg (37 lb)
- Length: 1,185 mm (46.7 in)
- Barrel length: 550 mm (22 in)
- Cartridge: 13×64mmB
- Caliber: 13 mm (0.51 in)
- Action: Recoil-operated; short recoil, open bolt
- Rate of fire: 900 round/min
- Muzzle velocity: 750 m/s (2,500 ft/s)
- Effective firing range: 1,800 m (2,000 yd)
- Feed system: Belt-fed

The MG 131 (shortened from German: Maschinengewehr 131, or "machine gun 131," and occasionally written as MG 131/13, particularly in German sources) was a German 13 mm caliber machine gun developed in 1938 by Rheinmetall-Borsig and produced from 1940 to 1945. The MG 131 was designed for use at fixed, flexible or turreted, single or twin mountings in Luftwaffe aircraft during World War II. It was also license-built in Japan for the Imperial Japanese Navy as Type 2 machine gun.

== Overview ==
The MG 131 was one of the smallest and lightest of the heavy machine guns of its era, with a weight of 16.6 kilograms (37 lb). This was less than 60% of the M2 Browning or the Breda-SAFAT machine gun while still providing rapid fire and heavy firepower for its mass. It could fire armor-piercing, incendiary, high-explosive, and tracer ammunition. The other main Axis automatic weapon of similar caliber, the Italian Breda 12.7 mm was around 13 kg heavier and bigger, while slower by at least 150 rpm. The MG 131's relatively small size allowed them to be mounted in the restricted space available in the nose of Luftwaffe fighters, originally designed to house the lighter-caliber 7.92 mm machine guns. This became the common configuration from 1943 onwards, as the increasing armour protection of most Allied aircraft and the increasing challenge of daylight raids by heavy American bombers as the war progressed rendered the smaller-caliber guns obsolescent in this role.

Lower ballistic properties that were still adequate for the task were obviously seen as an advantage: the gun was very accurate (35 × 45 cm spread at 100 m), and the barrel wore out much less quickly (barrel life of the MG 131 was 17,000 rounds), which meant that ballistic properties deteriorated more slowly.

It was installed in the Messerschmitt Bf 109, Me 410 Hornisse, Fw 190, Ju 88, Junkers Ju 388, He 177 Greif bomber variants, and many other aircraft. The Fernbedienbare Drehlafette FDL 131Z remotely controlled gun turret system used either a single or, more commonly, a pair of MG 131s for dorsal defense. The quadmount Hecklafette HL 131V weapons "system" for tail defense, had two MG 131 guns apiece in a pair of rotating, side-mount exterior elevation carriages (the manned turret "core" provided the traverse function), was meant for standardization on many late-war prototype developments of German heavy bomber airframes, but never came to fruition beyond a small number of dimensional prototype mockups and kinetic test units.

The MG 131 fired electrically primed ammunition in order to sustain a high rate of fire when shooting through the propeller disc of a single-engined fighter. A pair of MG 131 machine guns was used as cowl armament on later models of the Bf 109G and the Fw 190.

A variant for use on the ground, sometimes referred to as the "MG 131E" or "MG 131E-1," was trialed, with little information known. It was not utilized operationally nor placed into production. The weapon could be utilized with a shoulder stock and bipod and its electric firing system was maintained via a battery.

== Technical data ==
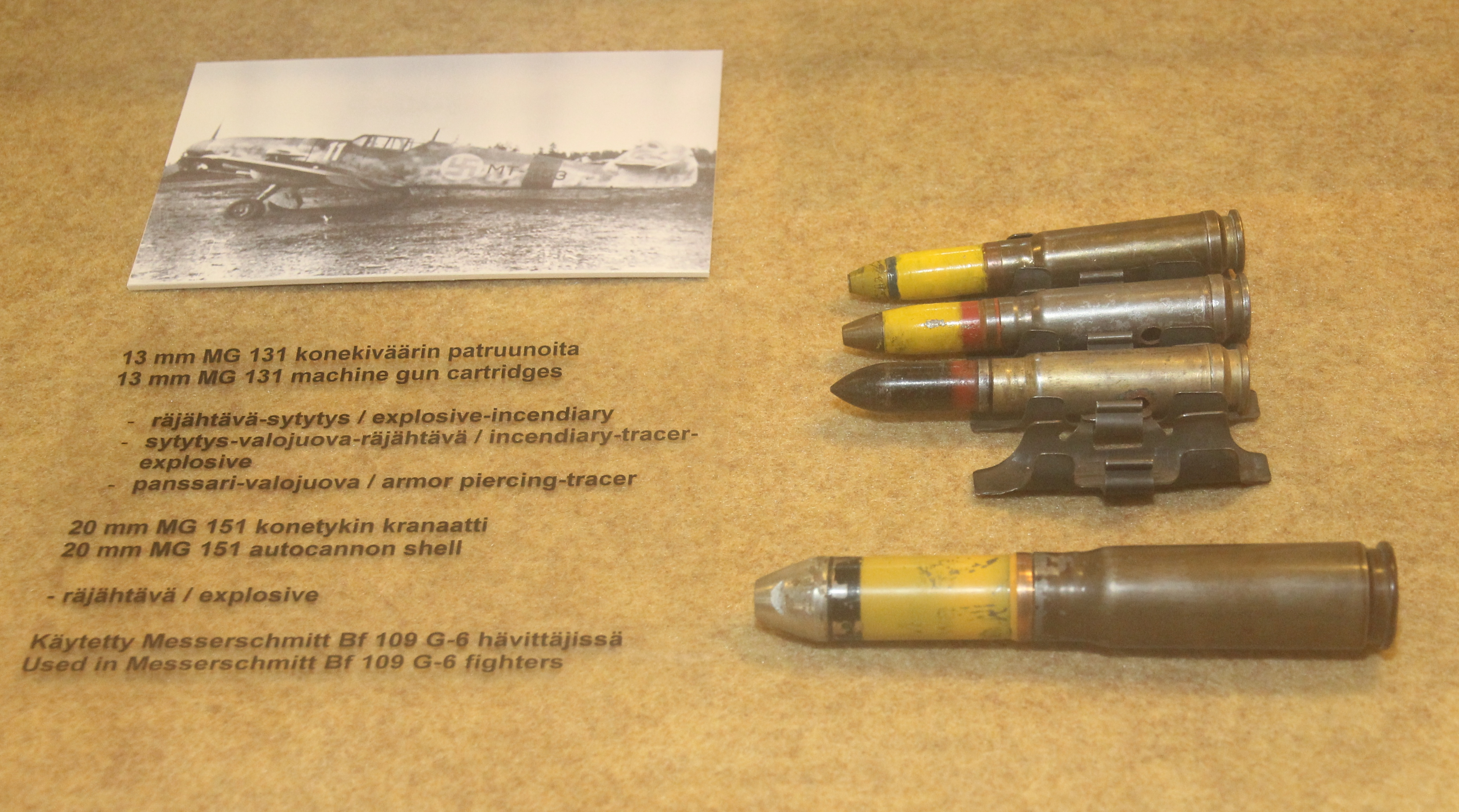
13 mm MG 131 and 20 mm MG 151/20 ammunition

- Weight: 16.6 kilograms (37 lb)
- Length: 1,185 mm (3.888 ft)
- Muzzle velocity: 750 m/s (2,500 ft/s)
- Rate of fire: 900 rpm AP-API; 930 rpm HEF-HEFI-I
- Accuracy: 35 × 45 cm spread at 100 m
- Barrel life: 17,000 rounds

== Ammunition specifications ==
The MG 131 is the sole user of the electrically primed 13×64 mm B cartridge. A mechanically primed variant was produced in small quantities in Spain for unknown uses.

German designation	US abbreviation	Projectile weight [g]	Bursting charge [g]	Muzzle velocity [m/s]	Description
13 mm Sprenggranatpatrone L'spur El. mit/ohne Zerleger	HEF-T	34±1	1.2–1.4 g HE (PETN) + (blasting cap) : 0.2 g HE (PETN) + 0.4 g HE (lead azide)-(tetrazene explosive)	750	Nose fuze, tracer, with or without self-destruct
13 mm Brandsprenggranatpatrone L'spur/Gl'spur El. ohne Zerleger	HEFI-T	34±1	0.9 g HE (PETN) + (blasting cap) : 0.2 g HE (PETN) + 0.4 g HE (lead azide)-(tetrazene explosive) + 0.3 g incendiary (elektron) (thermite)	750	Nose fuze, tracer, no self-destruct
13 mm Brandgranatpatrone El. ohne Zerleger	I	32±1	? g incendiary (BaNO_{3}+Al+Mg)	770	Nose fuze, no tracer, no self-destruct On impact, the priming charge shears away the grenade's cardboard head and sheet metal cap and ignites the incendiary charge in the projectile, which is sprayed forward up to 5 m of projectile travel. In air combat as a carrier of the incendiary effect, especially for the incendiary shooting of fuel tanks. As an indestructible body, it remains effective even after penetrating several bulkheads.
13 mm Brandgranatpatrone L'spur/Gl'spur El. ohne Zerleger	I-T	34±1	? g incendiary (BaNO_{3}+Al+Mg)	770	Nose fuze, tracer, no self-destruct On impact, the priming charge shears away the grenade's cardboard head and sheet metal cap and ignites the incendiary charge in the projectile, which is sprayed forward up to 5 m of projectile travel. In air combat as a carrier of the incendiary effect, especially for the incendiary shooting of fuel tanks. As an indestructible body, it remains effective even after penetrating several bulkheads.
13 mm Panzergranatpatrone L'spur/Gl'spur El. ohne Zerleger	AP-T	38.5±1	none (bakelite filling in cavity)	710	No fuze, tracer, no self-destruct. Penetration 10-14-17 mm of armour at 60-75-90-degree impact, 100 m range
13 mm Panzerbrandgranatpatrone (Phosphor) El. ohne Zerleger	API	38±1	0.36 g incendiary (WP)	710	No fuze, no tracer, no self-destruct. Penetration 10-14-17 mm of armour at 60-75-90-degree impact, 100 m range Incendiary effect also against protected fuel tanks when the specially hardened tail section of the grenade and the incendiary capsule break. The range of the incendiary effect extends over a distance of 2 m after the incendiary charge is released.

== See also ==
- List of World War II infantry weapons
- List of firearms
- Type 2 machine gun
- M2 Browning
