= List of ships sunk by missiles =

This is a list of ships sunk by missiles. Ships have been sunk by unguided projectiles for many centuries, but the introduction of guided missiles during World War II changed the dynamics of naval warfare. 1943 saw the first ships to be sunk by guided weapons, launched from aircraft, although it was not until 1967 that a ship was sunk by a missile launched from another ship outside a test environment. Both of these were warships, but missiles have also attacked merchant ships. More than fifty other vessels have been sunk, in war and in peace.

This list only contains vessels sunk by guided missiles, and does not include those destroyed by unguided weapons such as naval artillery, torpedoes or crewed weapons like the Kamikaze MXY-7 Ohka suicide rocket.

== Background ==
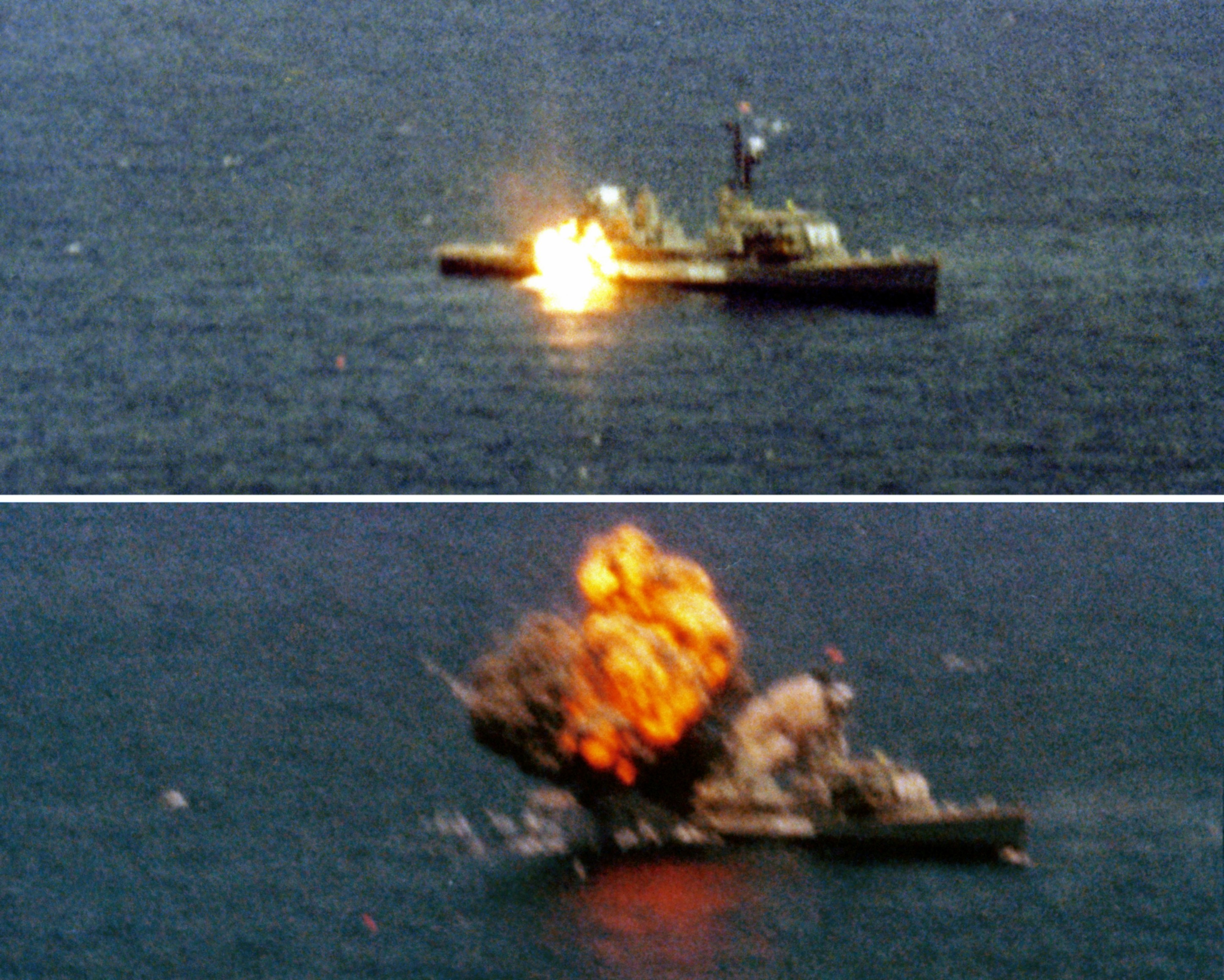
USS Agerholm being struck by a Tomahawk missile

Ships have been equipped to fire projectiles for centuries, particularly the use of trebuchet and, ultimately, cannon developed by the Song dynasty, the latter epitomising naval weaponry in the Age of Sail. However, the use of guided weapons did not emerge until the Second World War, when guided bombs, a form of precision-guided munition, started being developed by both the Allies and Axis. The first to be used operationally was a German weapon, the Fritz X. Initial attacks were unsuccessful, but on 9 September 1943, Fritz X damaged the Italian battleship Italia and sank the battleship Roma, the first successful strike by a guided missile against a capital ship. At the same time, the Henschel Hs 293 entered service, equipped with a rocket engine. First used in combat in 1943, these were the first guided missiles to sink a warship.

After the war, development of anti-ship missiles continued, particularly in the Soviet Union and Sweden, who saw mounting missiles on ships as a way to increase the strike capacity of small vessels. It was a Soviet missile, the P-15 Termit, that made this public and sunk a ship in combat on 21 October 1967, launched from a vessel of the Egyptian Navy. This demonstration led to a proliferation of other missiles being developed, including the Exocet. The Exocet was used extensively during the Iran–Iraq War, particularly during the Tanker War, where it was the primary missile used by Iraqi Air Force. In addition to nations, anti-ship missiles are also used by non-state actors who target merchant vessels, using missiles in a form of piracy.

To counter anti-ship missiles, warships have used surface-to-air missiles, advanced electronic countermeasures and close-in weapons systems.

== List ==
The list includes all verified sinkings. (Note: For example, the United States Navy claimed to have destroyed a Japanese destroyer with a ASM-N-2 Bat on 27 May 1945. However, this has not been confirmed and so it is excluded from the list.)

Ship	Nationality	Date	Conflict	Vector	Missile	Notes	Ref
HMS Egret	United Kingdom	27 August 1943	World War II	Aircraft	Henschel Hs 293	First ship sunk by guided missile (Note: The German Air Force claim to have sunk the freighter Uskide on 1 August 1943 but this is disputed.)	
RM Roma	(Kingdom of Italy) Italy	9 September 1943	World War II	Aircraft	Fritz X	First capital ship sunk by guided missiles	
USS LST-79	United States	30 September 1943	World War II	Aircraft	Henschel Hs 293		
HMS Dulverton	United Kingdom	13 November 1943	World War II	Aircraft	Henschel Hs 293		
MV Birchbank	United Kingdom	11 November 1943	World War II	Aircraft	Henschel Hs 293		
SS Carlier	Belgium	11 November 1943	World War II	Aircraft	Henschel Hs 293		
MV Marsa	United Kingdom	21 November 1943	World War II	Aircraft	Henschel Hs 293		
HMT Rohna	United Kingdom	26 November 1943	World War II	Aircraft	Henschel Hs 293	1,138 killed, the highest number of casualties caused by a single anti-ship missile	
HMHS St David	United Kingdom	24 January 1944	World War II	Aircraft	Henschel Hs 293		
SS Samuel Huntington	United States	29 January 1944	World War II	Aircraft	Henschel Hs 293		
HMS Spartan	United Kingdom	29 January 1944	World War II	Aircraft	Henschel Hs 293		
SS Elihu Yale	United States	15 February 1944	World War II	Aircraft	Henschel Hs 293		
HMS Inglefield	United Kingdom	25 February 1944	World War II	Aircraft	Henschel Hs 293		
HMS Lawford	United Kingdom	8 June 1944	World War II	Aircraft	Henschel Hs 293	Sunk during the Normandy landings	
USS LST-282	United States	15 August 1944	World War II	Aircraft	Henschel Hs 293		
Leningrad	Soviet Union	May 1963	---	Warship	P-35 Progress	Sunk in a missile test	
INS Eilat	Israel	21 October 1967	War of Attrition	Warship	P-15 Termit	First ship sunk by a ship-launched missile	
SS Orith	Israel	13 May 1970	War of Attrition	Warship	P-15 Termit		
PNS Khaibar	Pakistan	4 December 1971	Indo-Pakistan War of 1971	Warship	P-15 Termit		
PNS Muhafiz	Pakistan	4 December 1971	Indo-Pakistan War of 1971	Warship	P-15 Termit		
MV Venus Challenger	United States	8 December 1971	Indo-Pakistan War of 1971	Warship	P-15 Termit		
SS Gulf Star	Panama	8 December 1971	Indo-Pakistan War of 1971	Warship	P-15 Termit		
Yarmouk	Syria	8 October 1973	Yom Kippur War	Warship	Gabriel Mk 1		
Project 205 Moskit (Note: A Project 183R missile boat was also destroyed.)	Syria	8 October 1973	Yom Kippur War	Warship	Gabriel Mk 1		
Three Project 205 Moskit	Egypt	9 October 1973	Yom Kippur War	Warship	Gabriel Mk 1		
Ilya Mechnikov	Soviet Union	10 October 1973	Yom Kippur War	Warship	Gabriel Mk 1		
HMAS Air Sprite	Australia	17 May 1979	---	Warship	RIM-24 Tartar	Sunk as a target	
USS Robert L. Wilson	United States	1 March 1980	---	Warship	RGM-84 Harpoon	Sunk in a missile test	
Dhofar	Oman	18 May 1980	---	Aircraft	MM39 Exocet	Sunk as target	
USS Ozark	United States	1 March 1980	---	Aircraft	AGM-65 Maverick	Sunk as a target	
Two Project 205 Moskit	Iraq	29 November 1980	Iran-Iraq War	Warship	RGM-84 Harpoon		
IRIS Paykan	Iran	29 November 1980	Iran-Iraq War	Warship	P-15 Termit		
BAP Almirante Guise	Peru	1 October 1981	---	Warship	Otomat	Sunk in a missile test	
HMS Sheffield	United Kingdom	4 May 1982	Falklands War	Aircraft	AM39 Exocet	Sank two days after being hit	
ELMA Río Carcarañá	Argentina	24 May 1982	Falklands War	Aircraft	Sea Skua	Previously disabled by Sea Harrier cannon fire	
SS Atlantic Conveyor	United Kingdom	25 May 1982	Falklands War	Aircraft	AM39 Exocet		
PNA Río Iguazú	Argentina	13 June 1982	Falklands War	Aircraft	Sea Skua	Already stranded in Choiseul Sound after Sea Harrier attack	
USS Agerholm	United States	18 July 1982	---	Submarine	UGM-109 Tomahawk	Sunk in a missile test	
MV Sambow Banner	South Korea	9 August 1982	Iran-Iraq War	Aircraft	AM39 Exocet		
MV Eastern Hunter	Singapore	2 January 1983	Iran-Iraq War	Aircraft	AM39 Exocet		
MV Panoceanic Fame	Greece	15 May 1983	Iran-Iraq War	Aircraft	AM39 Exocet		
MV Iran Reshadat	Iran	24 August 1983	Iran-Iraq War	Aircraft	AM39 Exocet		
MV Iran Rezvan	Iran	25 October 1983	Iran-Iraq War	Aircraft	AM39 Exocet		
MV Skaros	Cyprus	1 February 1984	Iran-Iraq War	Aircraft	AM39 Exocet		
MV Charming	United Kingdom	1 March 1984	Iran-Iraq War	Aircraft	AM39 Exocet		
MV Rana	Saudi Arabia	23 August 1984	Iran-Iraq War	Aircraft	AM39 Exocet		
MV Song Bong	North Korea	13 September 1985	Iran-Iraq War	Aircraft	AM39 Exocet		
MV Castor	Liberia	27 February 1986	Iran-Iraq War	Aircraft	AM39 Exocet		
Waheed	Libya	25 March 1986	Action in the Gulf of Sidra (1986)	Aircraft	AGM-84 Harpoon		
Ain Zaquit	Libya	25 March 1986	Action in the Gulf of Sidra (1986)	Aircraft	AGM-84 Harpoon		
MV Harmony I	Malta	6 May 1986	Iran-Iraq War	Aircraft	AM39 Exocet		
Musson	USSR	16 April 1987	---	Missile boat	P-15 Termit	Accidentally hit by a training target missile during a training exercise and sunk	
MV Bigerange XIV	Panama	1 September 1987	Iran-Iraq War	Aircraft	AM39 Exocet		
MV Iran Sedaghat	Iran	31 December 1987	Iran-Iraq War	Aircraft	AM39 Exocet		
IRIS Joshan	Iran	19 April 1988	Operation Praying Mantis	Warship	RIM-66 Standard		
IRIS Sahand	Iran	19 April 1988	Operation Praying Mantis	Warship	RGM-84 Harpoon		
Sveti Vlaho	Croatia	6 December 1991	Croatian War of Independence	Coastal battery	9K11 Malyutka	Refloated in 2001 and preserved as a monument at Batala Park in Dubrovnik.	
TČ-219 Streljko	Yugoslavia	8 October 1994	Croatian War of Independence	Warship	RBS-15	Sunk as a target by the Croatian Navy; ship had been captured in 1991	
RČ-310 Velimir Škorpik	Yugoslavia	8 October 1994	Croatian War of Independence	Warship	P-15 Termit	Sunk as a target by the Croatian Navy; ship had been captured in 1991	
ARA Chiriguano	Argentina	October 1996	---	Aircraft	MM39 Exocet	Sunk as a target	
USS White Plains	United States	8 July 2002	---	Warship	RGM-84 Harpoon	Sunk as a target	
USS Harold E. Holt	United States	10 July 2002	---	Combined	AGM-114 Hellfire and RGM-84 Harpoon	Sunk as a target	
USS Spruance	United States	8 December 2006	---	Aircraft	AGM-84 Harpoon	Sunk as a target	
USS Horne	United States	14 July 2008	---	Aircraft	AGM-84 Harpoon	Sunk as a target	
Georgy Toreli	Georgia	10 August 2008	Russo-Georgian War	Warship	P-120 Malakhit		
USS Fresno	United States	15 September 2014	---	Warship	RGM-84 Harpoon	Sunk as a target	
USS Reuben James	United States	18 January 2016	---	Warship	RIM-174 Standard ERAM	Sunk in a missile test	
PNS Tippu Sultan	Pakistan	27 April 2020	---	Combined	Babur, AM39 Exocet and YJ-83	Sunk as a target	
USS Durham	United States	30 August 2020	---	Warship	RGM-84 Harpoon	Sunk as a target	
Jaceguai	Brazil	24 June 2021	---	Aircraft	AM39 Exocet	Sunk as a target	
Sloviansk	Ukraine	3 March 2022	Russian invasion of Ukraine	Aircraft	Kh-31		
Saratov	Russia	24 March 2022	Russian invasion of Ukraine	Ground battery	Tochka-U	Hit by ground-to-ground missile when moored in Berdyansk harbour.	
Moskva	Russia	14 April 2022	Russian invasion of Ukraine	Coastal battery	R-360 Neptune	Sunk by Ukrainian R-360 Neptune missiles	
Russian tug Spasatel Vasily Bekh	Russia	17 June 2022	Russian invasion of Ukraine	Coastal battery	RGM-84 Harpoon		
Russian landing ship Novocherkassk	Russia	26 December 2022	Russian invasion of Ukraine	Aircraft	Storm Shadow	Destroyed while in port at Sevastopol.	
Ternopil	Ukraine	21 July 2023	Russo-Ukrainian War	Warship	P-240 Moskit	Captured in 2014 at Donuzlav bay. Sunk in missile test	
KRI Slamet Riyadi	Indonesia	31 July 2023	---	Combined	C-704, AM39 Exocet and YJ-83	Sunk as a target	
M/V Rubymar	United Kingdom	2 March 2024	Red Sea crisis	Unknown	Ballistic missile	First ship sunk by an anti-ship ballistic missile	
Tsiklon	Russia	19 May 2024	Russian invasion of Ukraine	Surface battery	MGM-140 ATACMS	Sunk while in port at Sevastopol.	
Magic Seas	Liberia	6 July 2025	Red Sea crisis	Unknown	Ballistic missile	Sunk by a combination of ballistic and anti-ship missiles	
Eternity C	Liberia	7 July 2025	Red Sea crisis	Unknown	Ballistic missile	Sunk by a combination of ballistic and anti-ship missiles	
