= Focke-Wulf Fw 200 Condor =

German prop-driven aircraft built 1937–1944

Fw 200 Condor
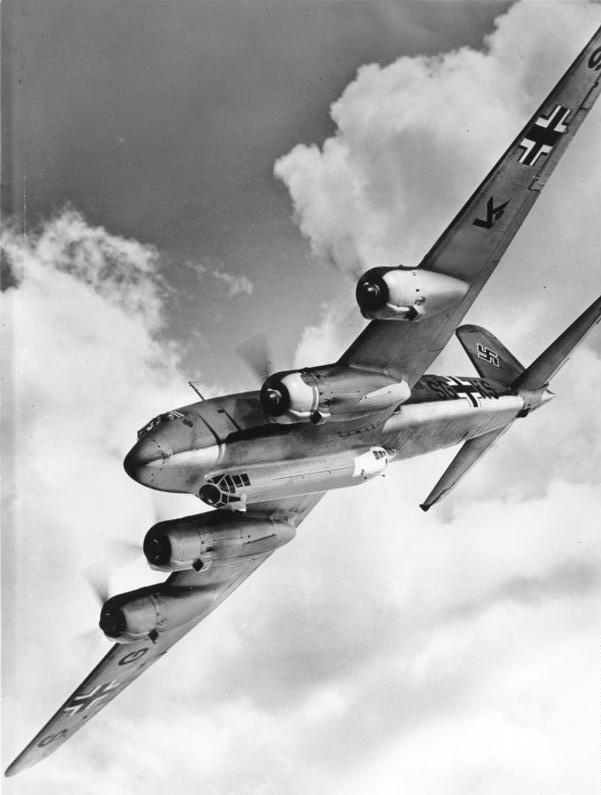
- Fw 200 C-3/U2 "SG+KS", became F8+AB of I.Gruppe/KG 40

General information
- Type: Airliner, reconnaissance, bomber, transport aircraft and maritime patrol aircraft
- Manufacturer: Focke-Wulf
- Primary users: Luftwaffe Deutsche Luft Hansa; Syndicato Condor
- Number built: 276

History
- Manufactured: 1937 - 1944
- First flight: 27 July 1937

The Focke-Wulf Fw 200 Condor, also known as Kurier (German for courier) to the Allies, is an all-metal four-engined monoplane designed and produced by the German aircraft manufacturer Focke-Wulf. It was the first heavier-than-air aircraft to fly nonstop between Berlin and New York City, about 4,000 miles (6,400 km), making the flight from Berlin-Staaken to Floyd Bennett Field on 10/11 August 1938 in 24 hours and 56 minutes.

It was originally proposed by the aeronautical engineer Kurt Tank as a long-range land-based airliner for the flag carrier Deutsche Luft Hansa. A key feature of the Fw 200 was its ability to cruise at altitudes in excess of 3,000 m (9,800 ft), which made long-distance routes more viable. A specification was issued in June 1936 and the maiden flight of the first prototype took place on 27 July 1937. Civilian Fw 200 were operated by Deutsche Luft Hansa, Det Danske Luftfartselskab, Syndicato Condor (the latter being Luft Hansa's Brazilian subsidiary), Cruzeiro do Sul, and the British Overseas Airways Corporation. The outbreak of the Second World War prevented the fulfilment of further civil orders for the type.

While intended for use as an airliner, the type was adapted for military purposes in response to a Japanese Navy request for a long-range maritime patrol aircraft. Military versions of the Fw 200 were adopted by the Luftwaffe, which used the type as both a long-range reconnaissance and maritime patrol aircraft, anti-shipping bomber, and transport aircraft. The Fw 200 was used to support the Kriegsmarine in both the North Sea and the Atlantic Ocean. It achieved success as a commerce raider in the Battle of the Atlantic, contributing to the heavy Allied shipping losses. By mid-1941, it was being increasingly harried by long-range aircraft dispatched by RAF Coastal Command as well as Hurricane fighters being flown from CAM ships. On 14 August 1942, an Fw 200C-3 was the first German aircraft to be destroyed by USAAF pilots, after it was attacked by a Curtiss P-40C Warhawk and a Lockheed P-38F Lightning over Iceland.

By the latter half of 1943, the Luftwaffe was almost exclusively using the Fw 200 as a transport aircraft. On numerous occasions, senior Nazi officials, including Joachim von Ribbentrop, Heinrich Himmler, Albert Speer, Hermann Göring, and Karl Dönitz made use of special aircraft. Furthermore, Adolf Hitler had a single customised Fw 200 made available as his personal aircraft. Following the end of the conflict, only limited use of the type was made, largely by Francoist Spain, due to a lack of available spares. By the twenty-first century, only a single complete reconstructed Fw 200 exists; it has been displayed at Berlin Tempelhof Airport.

== Design and development ==
The Fw 200 originated from a proposal made by the aeronautical engineer Kurt Tank, the chief designer of the German aircraft manufacturer Focke-Wulf to Dr. Rudolf Stüssel of the flag carrier Deutsche Luft Hansa for the development of a landplane capable of carrying passengers across the Atlantic Ocean to the United States. At the time, it was an unusual concept because airlines typically opted for seaplanes on their long over-water routes. To fly long distances economically, the Fw 200 was designed to cruise at an altitude of over 3,000 m (9,800 ft) - as high as possible without a pressurized cabin. Existing airliners were designed to cruise at altitudes below 1,500 m (4,900 ft). The Fw 200 was briefly the world's most modern airliner, until other high-altitude airliners entered service: the Boeing 307 Stratoliner in 1940 and the Douglas DC-4 in 1942. The designation "Condor" was chosen because, like the condor bird, the Fw 200 had a very long wingspan compared to other planes of its era, to facilitate high-altitude flight.

During June 1936, following discussions between Tank, Stüssel and Carl August von Gablenz, Deutsche Luft Hansa issued a specification. Focke-Wulf responded with what would become the Fw 200, a four-engined low-winged monoplane, almost entirely constructed of metal (exceptions include the fabric-covered flight control surfaces). It could accommodate up to 26 passengers in two cabins. The Fw 200 had a retractable landing gear; the legs of the main gear featured an unorthodox design which was to allow their deployment without any power other than that of the slipstream in the event of an emergency. On 16 July of that year, Focke-Wulf were awarded an initial contract.

On 27 July 1937, the first prototype, Fw 200 V1, conducted its maiden flight with Tank at the controls. It was powered by four American 652 kW (875 hp) Pratt & Whitney Hornet radial engines. Two further prototypes were built; these differed from the first only in that they were powered by German 540 kW (720 hp) BMW 132G-1 radials instead.

The Japanese Navy placed an order for a single militarised version of the Fw 200 outfitted to conduct search and patrol duties. Accordingly, Fw 200 V10 was constructed with military apparatus; while completed, this Fw 200 remained in Germany due to the outbreak of war in Europe by that point. At the direction of Edgar Peterson, the aircraft was adapted for long range reconnaissance and anti-shipping duties with the Luftwaffe to meet Germany's wartime needs. The adaptions made included the addition of hardpoints to the wings for bombs, strengthening of the fuselage (which was also extended to create more space), and the addition of fore and aft dorsal gun positions. Furthermore, an extended-length version of the Bola ventral gondola typical of Second World War-era German bomber aircraft was adopted; it incorporated a central bomb bay (which was typically used for additional long-range fuel tanks), as well as heavily glazed fore and aft ventral flexible machine gun emplacements at either end.

One unfortunate consequence of the extra weight incurred by the added military equipment, in combination with its relatively weak structure, was the loss of several early-build Fw 200s when they broke up during landing, often due to the failure of the rear spar. In response to this issue, later models were structurally strengthened. Some later-built aircraft were equipped with Lorenz FuG 200 Hohentwiel low UHF-band ASV radar in the nose; this apparatus permitted the Fw 200 to effectively perform blind bombing missions for the first time. In 1943, a version entered service that could carry the Henschel Hs 293 guided missile, mandating fitment of the associated Funkgerät FuG 203 Kehl radio guidance gear on a Condor to steer them. As the threat of interception grew as the war went on, the defensive armament on later-build Fw 200s was also bolstered.

In response to Germany's wartime demands, production of the Fw 200 climbed from 26 aircraft in 1940 to a peak of 84 aircraft in 1942. However, amid the Allied bombing of Germany, Focke-Wulf's factory in Cottbus was damaged, compelling the transfer of final assembly work to rival company Blohm and Voss. During 1944, only four Fw 200s were completed. Production was terminated that year, at which point 276 aircraft had been produced.

== Operational history ==
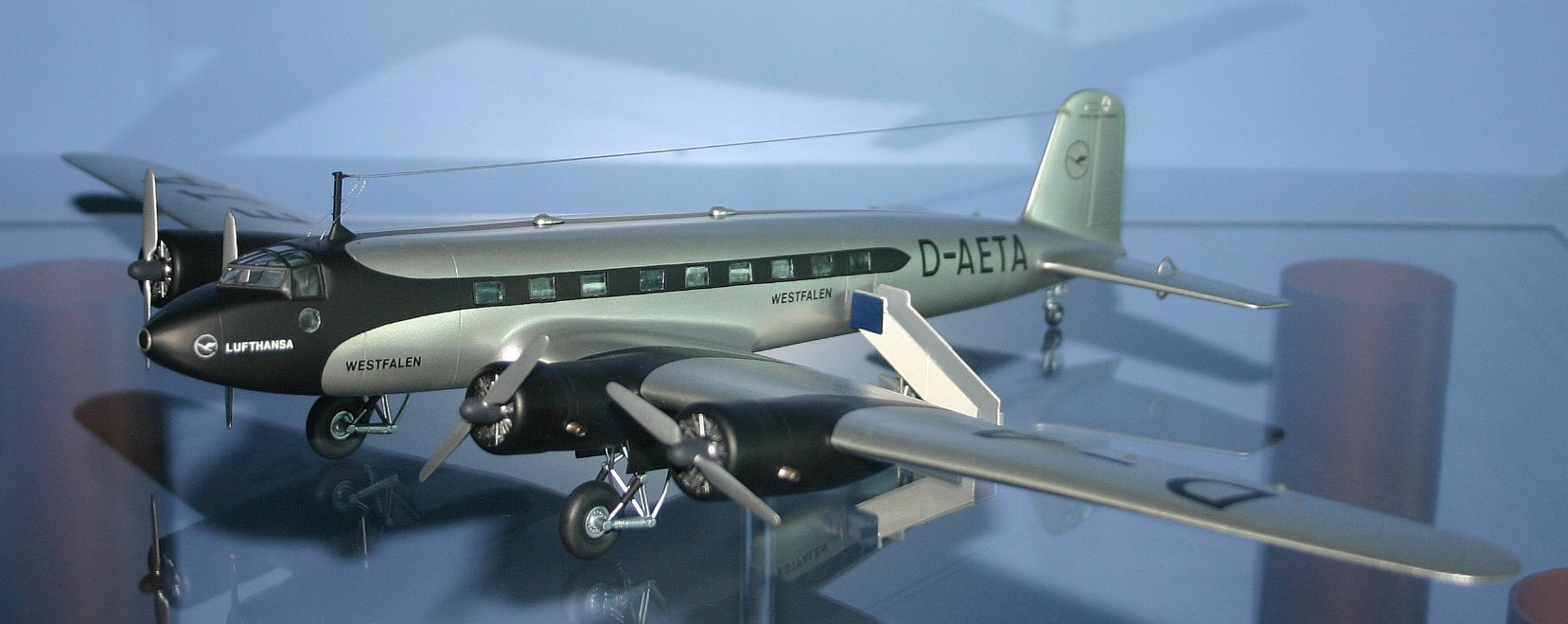
Focke-Wulf Fw 200 B Condor of Deutsche Luft Hansa (Model)

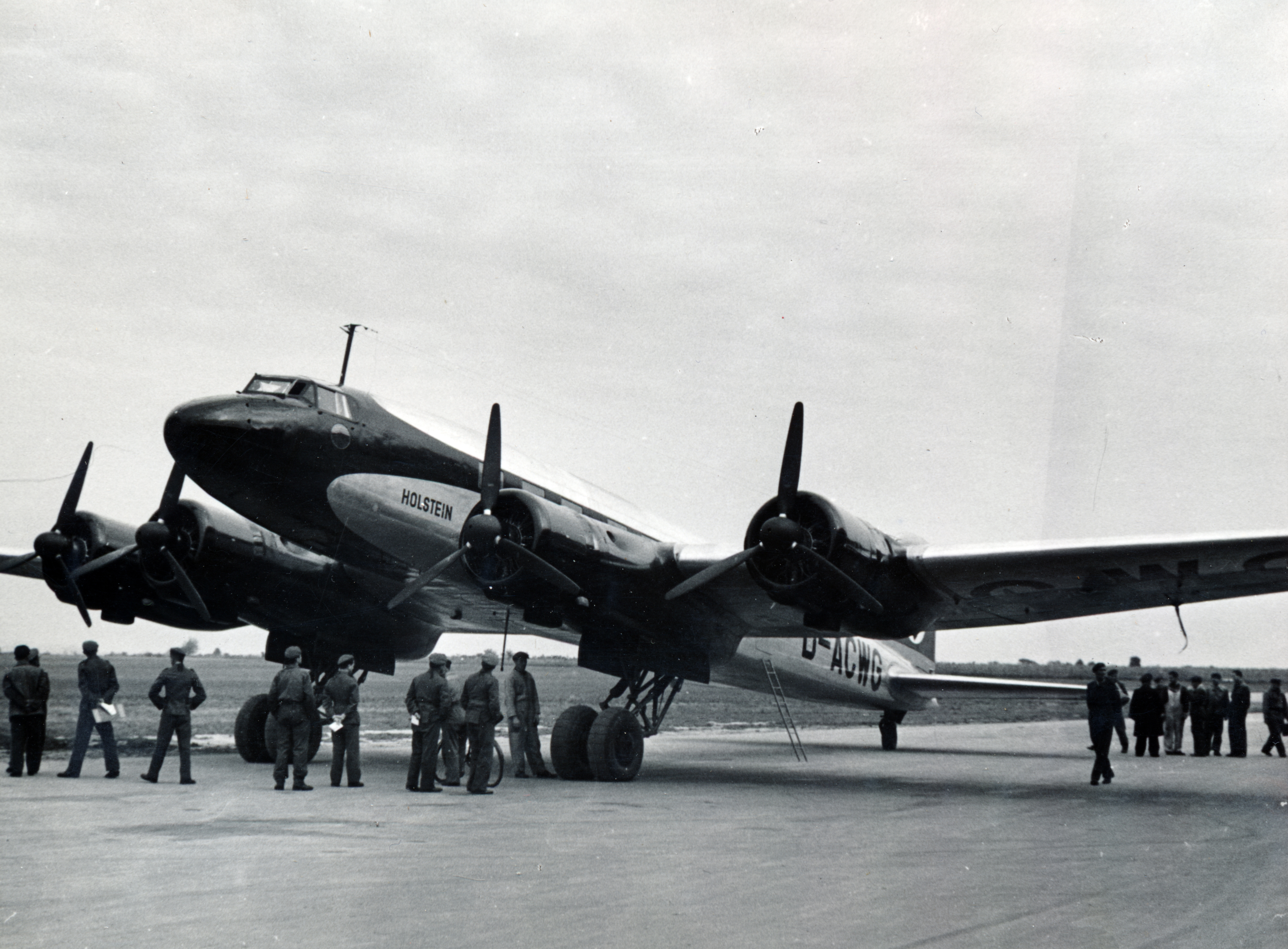
Fw 200 D-2, export version of B-2 variant, ordered but not delivered to Dai Nippon Kabushiki Kaisha. Later operated by Luft Hansa. Budaörs Airport, 1938 (?)

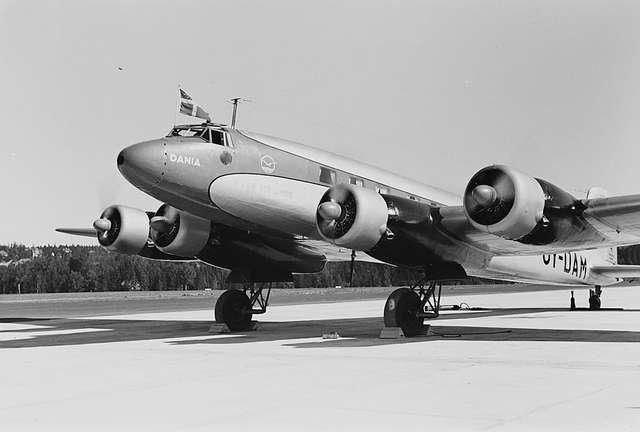
Danish Fw 200 airliner Dania at Fornebu Airport in Norway in 1939, with early single-wheel main gear.

The Fw 200 was operated by Deutsche Luft Hansa, Det Danske Luftfartselskab (DDL) and Luft Hansa's Brazilian subsidiary Syndicato Condor. Dai Nippon KK of Japan also ordered Fw 200 airliners; these could not be delivered to Japan once the war began, so they were delivered to Deutsche Luft Hansa instead. On 14 April 1945, an Fw 200 flew Luft Hansa's last scheduled service before the end of the Second World War, flying from Barcelona to Berlin. Other airlines continued to operate the Fw 200 after the end of the Second World War.

The first prototype, Fw 200 V1, upgraded with extra fuel tanks and redesignated Fw 200 S-1, made several record flights. It was the first heavier-than-air craft to fly nonstop between Berlin and New York City, about 4,000 miles (6,400 km), making the flight from Berlin-Staaken to Floyd Bennett Field on 10/11 August 1938 in 24 hours and 56 minutes. The return trip on 13 August 1938 took 19 hours and 47 minutes. These flights are commemorated with a plaque in Böttcherstraße, a street in Bremen. Beginning on 28 November 1938, it flew from Berlin to Tokyo via Basra, Karachi and Hanoi.

German Foreign Minister Joachim von Ribbentrop used a specially outfitted Condor "Grenzmark", on his two flights to Moscow in 1939, during which he negotiated and signed the "Treaty of Non-Aggression between Germany and the Soviet Union", better known as the Molotov–Ribbentrop Pact. His aircraft bore the German civil registration of D-ACVH.

A Danish-owned Fw 200, named Dania, was seized by the British at Shoreham Airport after Denmark was invaded by German forces in 1940. It was subsequently operated by British Overseas Airways Corporation (BOAC) and was then pressed into service with the Royal Air Force. It was damaged beyond repair in 1941.

During September 1939, the Luftwaffe took delivery of a batch of ten pre-production Fw 200Cs. As they were unarmed, the first four aircraft were exclusively used as transports alongside the earlier Fw 200Bs. Amongst other early operations, the type was used during the German invasion of Norway. Operational sorties of the armed Fw 200Cs, however, did not take place until 8 April 1940. The Luftwaffe used its maritime-configured Fw 200c to support the Kriegsmarine; a typical patrol flight consisted of large circuits out across the North Sea and, following the fall of France, the Atlantic Ocean. The type was used for maritime patrols and reconnaissance, searching for Allied convoys and warships that could be reported for targeting by U-boats. Occasionally, the type was also used to lay naval mines around port entrances across the east coast of England.

A maritime-configured Fw 200 could carry a 1,000-kilogram (2,200 lb) bomb load or mines to use against shipping, and it was claimed that from June 1940 to February 1941, they sank 331,122 tonnes (365,000 tons) of shipping despite being furnished with a rather crude bombsight. These attacks were typically carried out at extremely low altitude in order to "bracket" the target ship with three bombs; this almost guaranteed a hit. Winston Churchill called the Fw 200 the "Scourge of the Atlantic" during the Battle of the Atlantic due to its contribution to the heavy Allied shipping losses.

Following the debut of what would become the Luftwaffe's primary seaborne maritime patrol aircraft, the rival trimotor BV 138C flying boat in March 1941; from mid-1941, Condor crews were instructed to stop attacking shipping and avoid all combat in order to preserve numbers. In August, the first Fw 200 was shot down by a CAM ship-launched Hawker Hurricane, and the arrival of the U.S.-built Grumman Martlet, operating from the Royal Navy's new escort carriers, posed a serious threat. The six Martlets operated by the Royal Navy from the first escort carrier HMS Audacity shot down a total of seven Condors while escorting three convoys during her short career in the final months of 1941. On 14 August 1942, an Fw 200C-3 was the first German aircraft to be destroyed by USAAF pilots, after it was attacked by a Curtiss P-40C Warhawk and a Lockheed P-38F Lightning over Iceland.

The Fw 200 was also used as a transport aircraft, notably flying supplies into Stalingrad in 1943. The type was occasionally used in clandestine operations in support of German spies. After late 1943, the Fw 200 came to be used solely for transport. In the reconnaissance role, it was replaced with the Junkers Ju 290, and even some examples of the Heinkel He 177 Greif bombers serving with Kampfgeschwader 40. With the Allied advance into France, maritime reconnaissance by the Luftwaffe became impossible as the Atlantic coastal bases were captured.

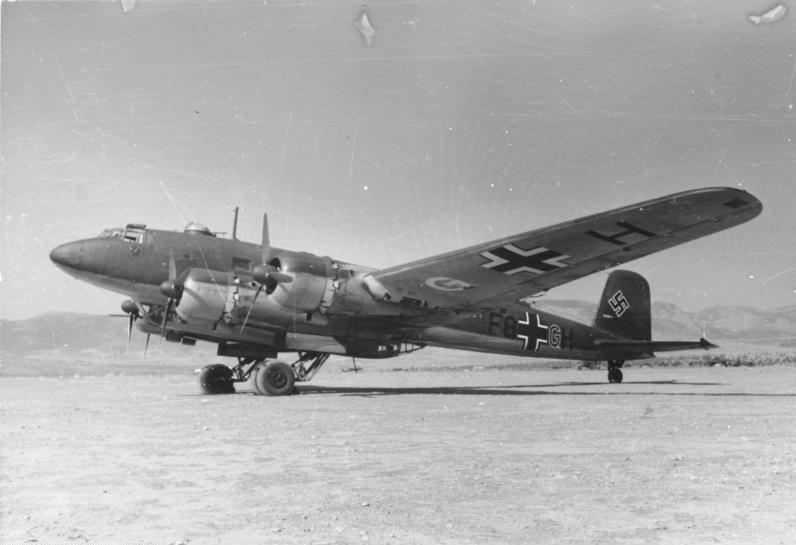
Fw 200 in Greece, circa 1941

Several damaged Fw 200s landed in Spain during the conflict. In the beginning, they were repaired and returned to their bases in France. After Operation Torch (the Allied invasion of French North Africa), the Spanish government interned four aircraft that arrived on Spanish territory (although their crews were still allowed to return to Germany). Since the aircraft could not be used, they were sold by Germany to Spain. One of the three flyable aircraft was then operated by the Spanish Air Force and the others used for spares. Because of damage and lack of spares, and for political reasons, they were grounded and scrapped around 1950.

Some Condors also crashed in Portugal. Their crews were allowed to return to Germany while the British authorities were allowed to inspect the aircraft and accompanying documentation. Some crew members died in these crashes and were buried in the civilian cemetery of Moura in Alentejo Province, Portugal. The aircraft that crashed in Spain and Portugal had been based at Bordeaux-Merignac, France since 1940. Before then, the operational base of the Fw 200 squadrons had been in Denmark.

=== Hitler's personal transport ===
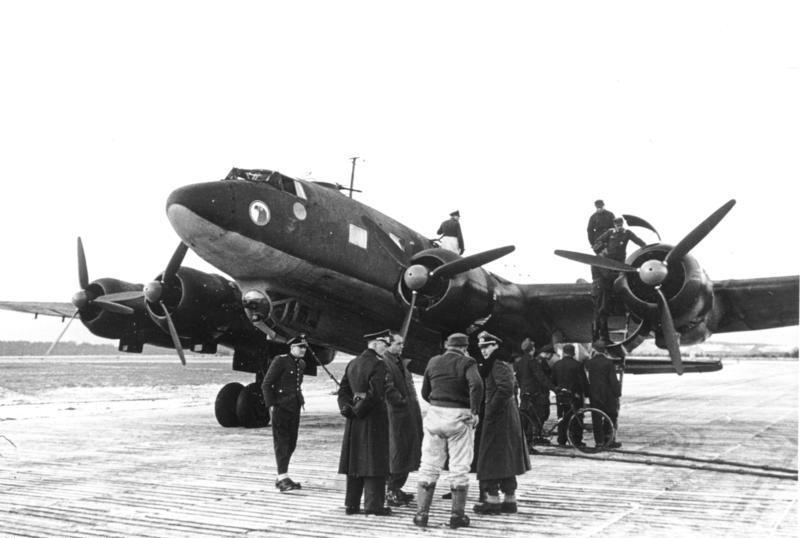
Adolf Hitler's personal Fw 200 Condor, bearing the insignia of the Fliegerstaffel des Führers on its nose

At the suggestion of his personal pilot Hans Baur, Adolf Hitler specified a modified and unarmed prototype Condor, the Fw 200 V3, as his personal transport, as a replacement for his Junkers Ju 52. Originally configured as a 26-passenger Luft Hansa transport (Works No. 3099), it was reconfigured as a plush two-cabin airliner. Hitler's armchair-style seat in the cabin was equipped with a wooden table, seat-back armour plating, and a parachute in the seat cushion, with an escape hatch in the floor. In line with Hitler's aircraft preferences, it carried the markings "D-2600" and was named "Immelmann III" in honour of World War I flying ace Max Immelmann. As the war progressed it changed designation to "WL+2600" and finally "26+00"; it was destroyed at Berlin Tempelhof Airport in an Allied bombing raid on 18 July 1944. FW 200s of various types were configured as VIP transports, for the use of Hitler and his staff, other aircraft being assigned to Heinrich Himmler, Albert Speer, Hermann Göring, and Karl Dönitz.

=== Allied tactics used against the Condor ===
Royal Naval Fleet Air Arm pilot Captain Eric Brown's aircraft was seriously damaged by defensive fire during an attack he made on a Condor in 1940, and he narrowly survived. After this, he studied the design of the Condor seriously for some time. He managed to work out that the forward firing machine gun positions could swivel, but could only fire in a certain arc otherwise they would hit the fuselage of their aircraft. Brown worked out where the arc was, and realised this was a blind spot, if one attacked the front of the plane. He used this to destroy a Condor, then informed his fellow squadron pilots who used the tactic to destroy others.

== Variants ==
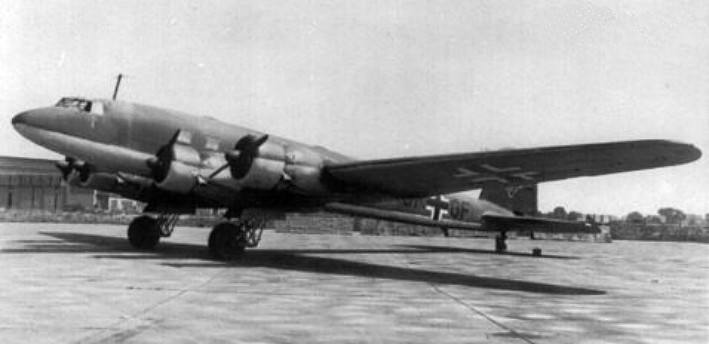
A former Fw 200 A airliner used as a Luftwaffe transport.

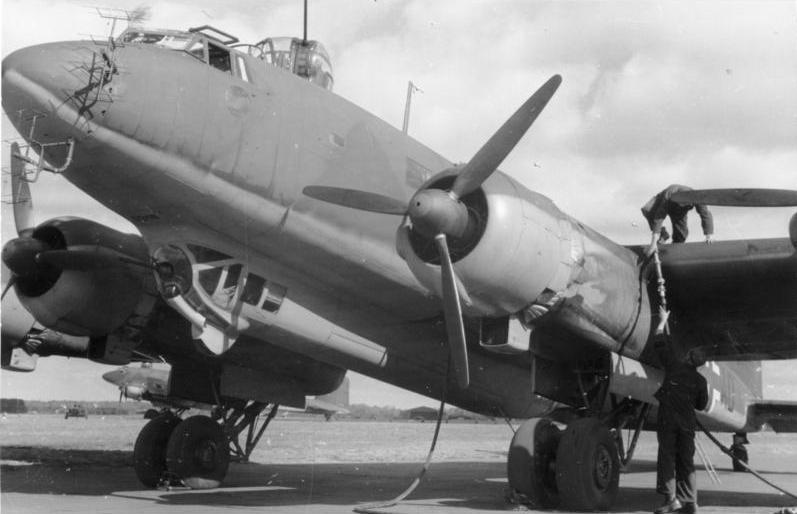
The ASV radar-equipped Fw 200 C-4, showing the twin-wheel main gear used for all production Fw 200Cs and enlarged dorsal turret of the C-3/U1

There were three variants of the aircraft: the Fw 200A, B, and C. The Model A was a purely civilian variant used by Deutsche Luft Hansa, DDL in Denmark, and Syndicato Condor in Brazil. The Fw 200B and Fw 200C models were used as long-range bombers, reconnaissance, troop and transport aircraft.

Fw 200 V1
First prototype. Converted to a Fw 200 S-1 in 1938.
Fw 200 V10
Military prototype developed for Japan, but held in Germany due to the start of WWII. Served as the basis for the C-series.
Fw 200 A-0
Pre-production batch of fourth to ninth prototypes.
Fw 200 B-1
Transportation aircraft fitted with four BMW 132Dc engines; one built.
Fw 200 B-2
Transportation aircraft fitted with four BMW 132H engines; three built.
Fw 200 C-0
Pre-production batch of 10 aircraft, structural strengthening, the first four were manufactured as unarmed transports, the remaining six were fitted with armament.
Fw 200 C-1
First military production version, BMW 132H engines, fitted with full-length Bola ventral gondola which added a narrow bomb bay to the airframe, increased defensive armament, provisions for four 250 kg (550 lb) bombs.
Fw 200 C-2
Similar to C-1, but featured a recessed underside to the rear sheet metal of each of the two outboard engine nacelles which reduced drag, where a hardpoint for a 250 kg (550 lb) bomb or a 300 L (80 US gal) capacity, standard Luftwaffe drop tank was placed.
Fw 200 C-3
Structurally strengthened, fitted with Bramo 323 R-2 radial engines.
Fw 200 C-3/Umrüst-Bausatz 1(/U1)
Featured increased defensive armament, a 15 mm MG 151 cannon in an enlarged powered forward dorsal turret similar to those used for the BV 138's bow turret position, the 20 mm MG FF replaced by a MG 151/20 cannon.
Fw 200 C-3/U2
Fitted with original, "hemispherical" dorsal turret, and had the 20 mm MG 151/20 at the front end of the ventral Bola gondola replaced with a 13 mm (0.5 in) MG 131 machine gun, which allowed space for the installation of a Lotfe 7D bombsight.
Fw 200 C-3/U3
Fitted with two additional 13 mm MG 131s.
Fw 200 C-3/U4 Fernaufklarer
Had 7.92 mm (0.31 in) MG 15 machine gun replaced by 13 mm MG 131s and carried an extra gunner.
Fw 200 C-4
Similar to C-3, but carried FuG Rostock search radar, late production aircraft used FuG 200 Hohentwiel low-UHF band ASV sea search radar. Front dorsal turret changed into a cylindrical one.
Fw 200 C-4/U1 (Werk-Nr 137)
High-speed transport aircraft, only one example built with shortened Bola gondola without bomb bay. Used to transport Adolf Hitler, Heinrich Himmler and Karl Dönitz. Bore the Stammkennzeichen alphabetic code of GC + AE. Captured by British and used as transport by them while based at Airfield B.164 Schleswig, flown frequently by Eric Brown - later to RAE Farnborough with Air Min number 94
Fw 200 C-4/U2 (Werk-Nr 138)
High-speed transport aircraft with similarly shortened Bola gondola (with no bomb bay) to earlier C-4/Umrüst-Bausatz 1 version, with accommodation for 14 passengers, only one example built.
Fw 200 C-6
Several aircraft were outfitted with an early version of the FuG 203 Kehl series missile control transmitter, to carry Henschel Hs 293 missiles and re-designated C-6.
Fw 200 C-8
Fitted with Lorenz FuG 200 Hohentwiel low-UHF band ASV sea-search radar as with some C-4 examples; some examples equipped with FuG 203b Kehl III missile control transmitter and fitted with capability to deploy Henschel Hs 293 MCLOS guidance, rocket-boosted anti-ship missiles from the pair of outer-engine nacelle hardpoints.
Fw 200 S-1
Special designation for Fw 200 V1 that was flown from Berlin to Tokyo.
MK-200
Two Fw 200C-4 re-engined with ASh-62IR engines, operated 1947 to 1950.

== Operators ==
=== Civil operators ===
Brazil

- Cruzeiro do Sul
- Syndicato Condor - Serviços Aéreos Condor

Denmark

- Det Danske Luftfartselskab

Nazi Germany

- Deutsche Luft Hansa

United Kingdom

- British Overseas Airways Corporation

=== Military operators ===
Nazi Germany

- Luftwaffe

Soviet Union

- Soviet Air Force (post-war captured)

Spain

- Spanish Air Force (Interned)

United Kingdom

- Royal Air Force (one aircraft interned)

== Accidents and incidents ==
- On 6 December 1938, a Deutsche Luft Hansa Fw 200S-1 (D-ACON, Brandenburg) ditched in Cavite Bay, Philippines following a loss of engine power due to a broken fuel line; all six on board survived, but the aircraft was written off. The aircraft was on a Berlin–Basra–Karachi–Hanoi–Tokyo publicity flight.
- On 22 April 1940, Luftwaffe Fw 200S-10 "CB+FB" of I/KG 40 (former Deutsche Luft Hansa D-ABOD Kurmark) crashed during the invasion of Norway.
- On 20 July 1940, two Deutsche Luftwaffe Fw 200C KG 40 were lost - one (F8-EH) shot down over Sunderland (Crew 3 lost/2 POW); the other lost off Northern Ireland to cause unknown (Crew 2 Killed/3 POW)
- On 20 August 1940, Luftwaffe Fw 200C-1 "F8+KH" of I/KG 40 crashed at Faha Ridge, Cloghane, Ireland; all six on board survived and were interned in Ireland.
- On 22 October 1940, Luftwaffe Fw 200C-1 "F8+OK" of I/KG 40 went missing over the Irish Sea. Possibly unknown bomber which sank the Irish Vessel "Kerry Head" in the Atlantic Ocean off Cape Clear Island, County Cork, Ireland;: reportedly the bomber was brought down in explosion; no survivors from either ship or plane.

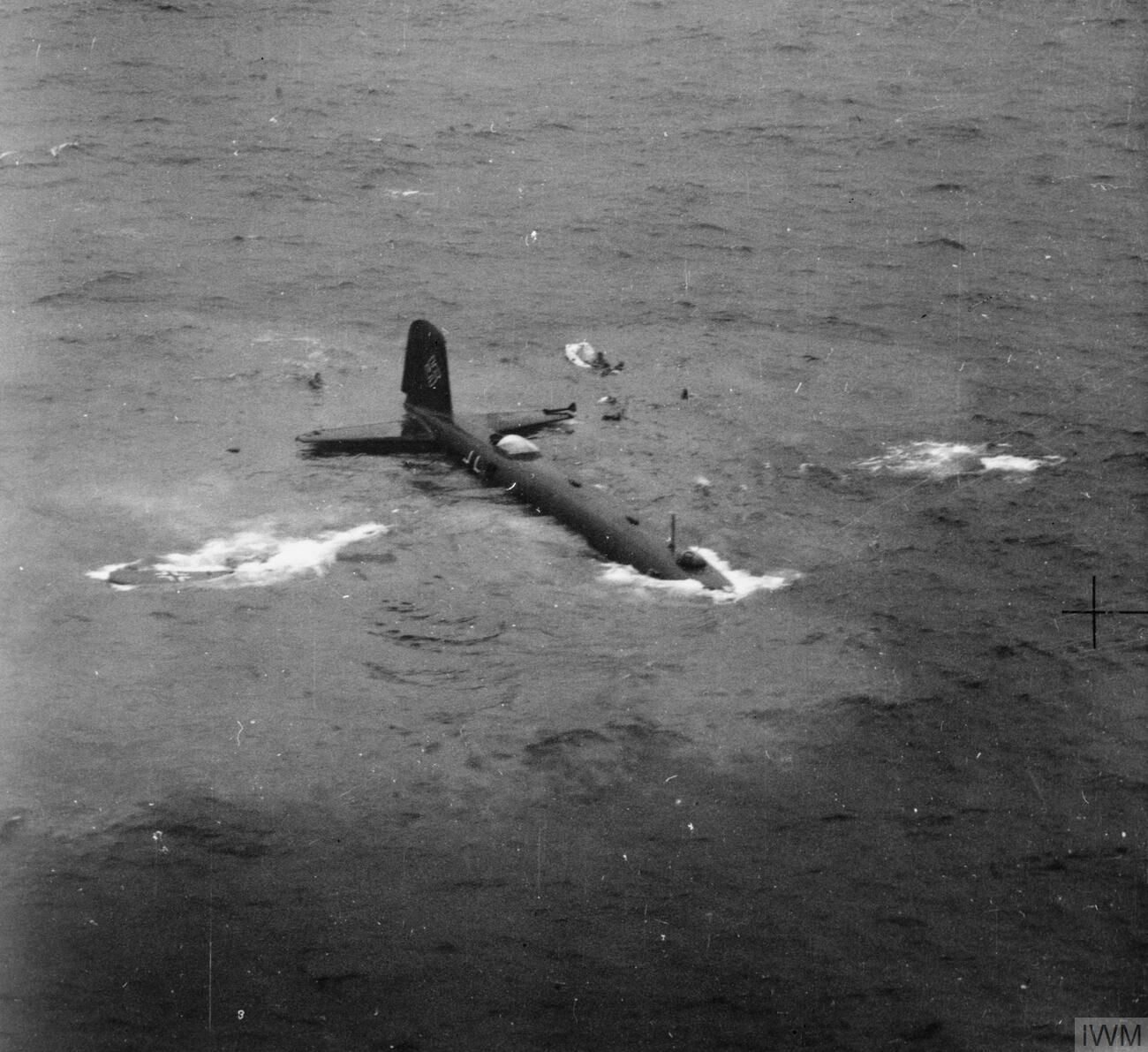
A Focke-Wulf Fw 200C of KG 40 sinking in the Atlantic Ocean west of Ireland, after being shot down by a Lockheed Hudson Mk V of No. 233 Squadron RAF 23 July 1941.

- On 15 June 1941, Luftwaffe Fw 200A-0 "F8+CU" (former Luft Hansa D-ADHR) burned out at Aalborg Airport following an engine fire.
- On 23 July 1941, a Deutsche Luftwaffe Fw 200C of KG 40 was lost in the Atlantic Ocean west of Ireland, after being shot down by a Lockheed Hudson Mark V of No. 233 Squadron RAF.
- On 22 October 1942, Luftwaffe Fw 200C-4/U3 "F8+EK" of 1.(F)/120 and I./KG 40 was shot down by two USAAF P-38 Lightning fighters and crashed at Kleppatagl, Iceland, killing all seven on board.
- On 9 July 1943, a Luftwaffe Fw 200 of III/KG 40 was shot down by a British fighter and struck a cliff near Aljezur, Portugal, killing all seven on board.
- On 18 July 1944, Adolf Hitler's personal Fw 200 V3 [26+00] was destroyed in bombing.
- On 27 September 1944, a Deutsche Luft Hansa Fw 200D-2 (D-AMHL) en route to Spain was shot down by an RAF Bristol Beaufighter night-fighter of No. 415 Squadron and crashed at Saint-Nicolas-lès-Cîteaux, France, killing all nine on board.
- On 29 November 1944, a Deutsche Luft Hansa Fw 200A-0/S-5 (D-ARHW, Friesland) en route from Berlin to Stockholm, was accidentally shot down by a German patrol boat and crashed off Måkläppen, Sweden, killing all ten on board.
- On 11 October 1944, Luftwaffe Fw 200C-4 (radio code F8+ES, Werknummer 0163) of 8./KG 40 crashed at Kvanntoneset, Norway due to tail separation while flying over Lavanger fjord, killing all 21 on board.
- On 21 April 1945, a Deutsche Luft Hansa Fw 200KB-1 (D-ASHH, Hessen) crashed near Piesenkofen, Germany, killing all 21 on board.
- On 4 September 1946, a Danish Air Lines (DDL) Fw 200A-5 (OY-DEM, Jutlandia) crashed at Northolt Airport after landing in crosswinds; there were no casualties, but the aircraft was written off.
- On 13 December 1946, a Polyarnaya Aviatsiya ('Polar Aviation', a division of Aeroflot) Fw 200C-3 (СССР-N400) force-landed off Ostrov Litne due to engine problems; all 21 on board survived, but the aircraft was written off.
- On 8 March 1947, a Cruzeiro do Sul Fw 200A-0 (PP-CBI, Abaitara) was struck by a Panair do Brazil Douglas DC-3 (PP-PCK) that was landing at Santos-Dumont Airport, there were no casualties, but the Fw 200 was written off.
- On 23 April 1950, a Polyarnaya Aviatsiya MK-200 (СССР-N500) overran the runway and crashed at Yakutsk Airport due to crosswinds; all nine on board survived, the aircraft was written off.

== Surviving aircraft ==
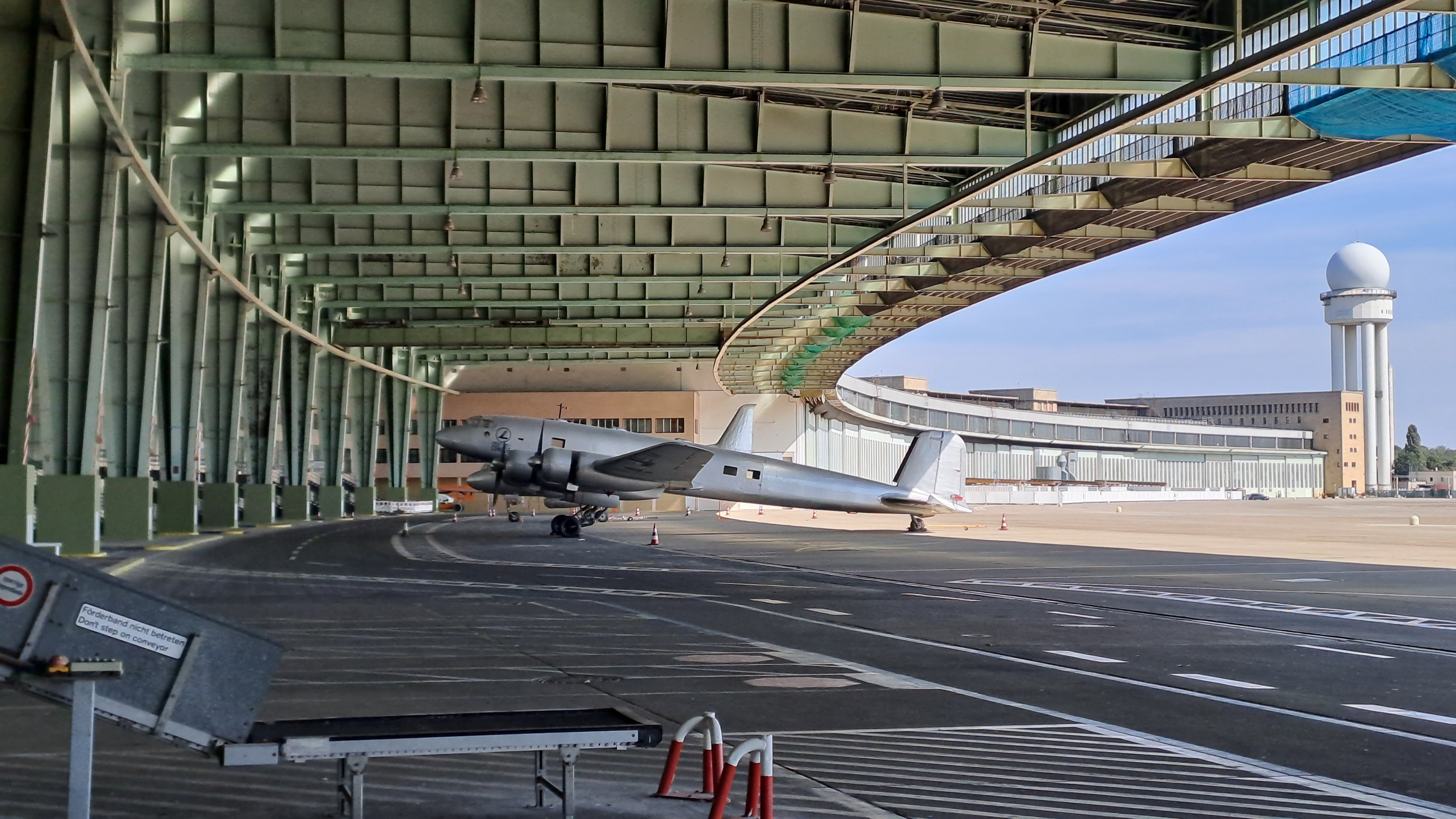
Focke-Wulf 200 at Tempelhof 2023

Only one complete reconstructed Fw 200 exists today, an aircraft that ditched in February 1942 and sank to a depth of 60 m (197 ft). This aircraft was raised from Trondheim Fjord in Norway on 26 May 1999. Although the airframe disintegrated while being lowered onto a recovery platform, the remains were transported to Airbus Bremen and spent 22 years being rebuilt. A request from the Berlin museum for a set of separate wings to be recovered from the Kvitanosi mountain near Voss in Norway to complete the rebuilding was at first denied, because the local population wanted the wings to be left in situ as a war memorial. A compromise was reached in 2008, where parts not needed for the restoration would be left on the mountain. In 2009, parts were moved down by helicopter and made ready for transport to Bremen. Other wrecks were also found, but in extremely poor conditions, one at 68 m deep. The aircraft was finished in June 2021, then dismantled and transported to the former Berlin Tempelhof Airport for final assembly as an exhibit in Hangar 7.

== Specifications (Fw 200 C-3/U4) ==
Data from Warplanes of the Luftwaffe

General characteristics

- Crew: five
- Capacity: 30 fully armed troops in transport configuration
- Length: 23.45 m (76 ft 11 in)
- Wingspan: 32.85 m (107 ft 9 in)
- Height: 6.3 m (20 ft 8 in)
- Wing area: 119.85 m^{2} (1,290.1 sq ft)
- Empty weight: 17,005 kg (37,490 lb)
- Max takeoff weight: 22,714 kg (50,076 lb)
- Powerplant: 4 × Bramo 323R-2 nine-cylinder single-row air-cooled radial piston engine (Note: with 'C3' 96 octane fuel injection at take off), 809 kW (1,085 hp) each
- Propellers: 3-bladed variable-pitch propellers

Performance

- Maximum speed: 380 km/h (240 mph, 210 kn) at 4,800 m (15,700 ft)
- Cruise speed: 335 km/h (208 mph, 181 kn) at 4,000 m (13,000 ft) (Max cruise)
- Range: 3,560 km (2,210 mi, 1,920 nmi)
- Endurance: 14 hours
- Service ceiling: 6,000 m (20,000 ft)

Armament

- Guns: ** 1 × 7.92 mm (0.312 in) MG 15 machine gun in Drehkranz D-30 forward dorsal turret with 1,125 rounds
  - 1 × 13 mm (0.51 in) MG 131 machine gun in aft dorsal turret with 1,000 rounds
  - 1 × 20 mm (0.79 in) MG 151 cannon in forward ventral gondola position with 800 rounds
  - 1 × 7.92 mm (0.312 in) MG 15 machine gun in rear ventral gondola position with 750 rounds
  - 2 × 7.92 mm (0.312 in) MG 15 machine gun in flexible mountings firing laterally, one on each side of the fuselage with 1,500 rounds
- Bombs: Up to 1,000 kg (2,200 lb) of bombs internally or up to 5,400 kg (11,900 lb) externally on four PVC 1006 underwing racks

== See also ==
Related development

- Focke-Wulf Fw 300
- Focke-Wulf Ta 400

Aircraft of comparable role, configuration, and era

- Bloch MB.160
- Boeing 307 Stratoliner
- Douglas DC-4E

Related lists

- List of aircraft of World War II
- List of bomber aircraft
- List of military aircraft of Germany
