= Henschel Hs 294 =

Aerial bomb

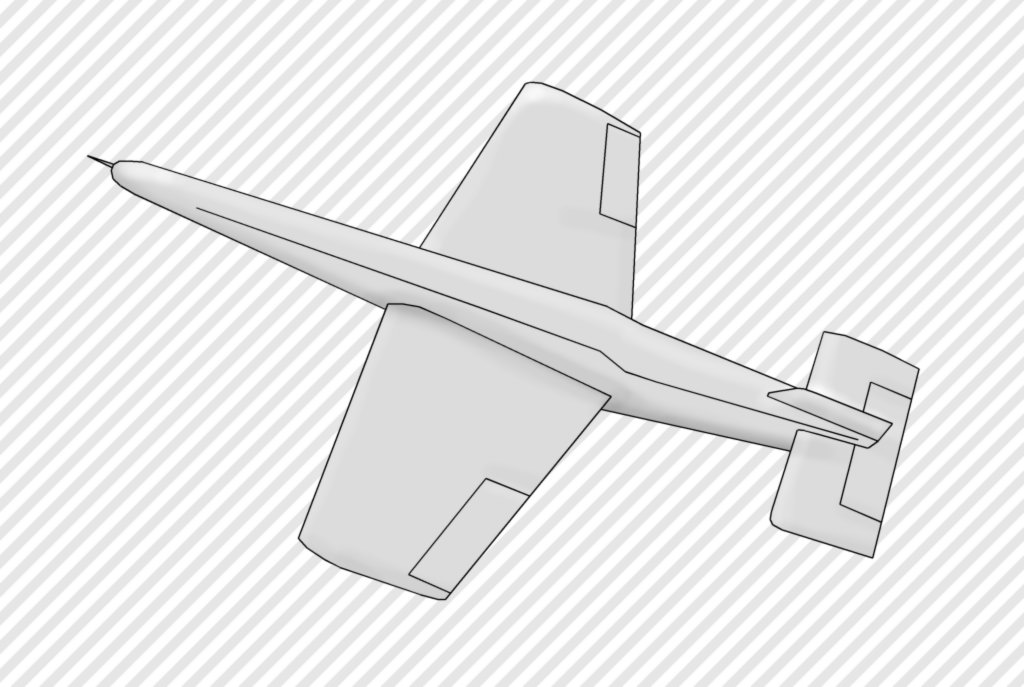
Scheme of the Hs 294

The Henschel Hs 294 was a guided air-to-sea missile developed by Henschel Flugzeug-Werke in Germany during World War II.

== Design ==
The Hs 294 was a further development of the Henschel Hs 293 rocket powered glide bomb, but was of an elongated, more streamlined shape. When launched from an aircraft, it was guided to its target with the same Kehl-Straßburg remote control system used for both the Hs 293 and unpowered Fritz X glide bombs. Just before it reached its target, it was guided into the water whereupon its wings would break off and then it then would run like a torpedo, propelled by its remaining kinetic energy so it would explode below the waterline of the vessel. The proximity fuze was that of a regular German torpedo.

== See also ==
- List of German guided weapons of World War II
- Ruhrstahl X-4 - Max Kramer's air-to-air guided missile
- Yokosuka MXY-7 Ohka
- Project Pigeon
- LBD-1 Gargoyle
- GB-1
- GB-4
- GT-1 (missile)
