= HMT Rohna =

British passenger and cargo liner; sunk in 1943 by Nazi air forces

Coordinates: 37°1′12″N 5°12′6″E

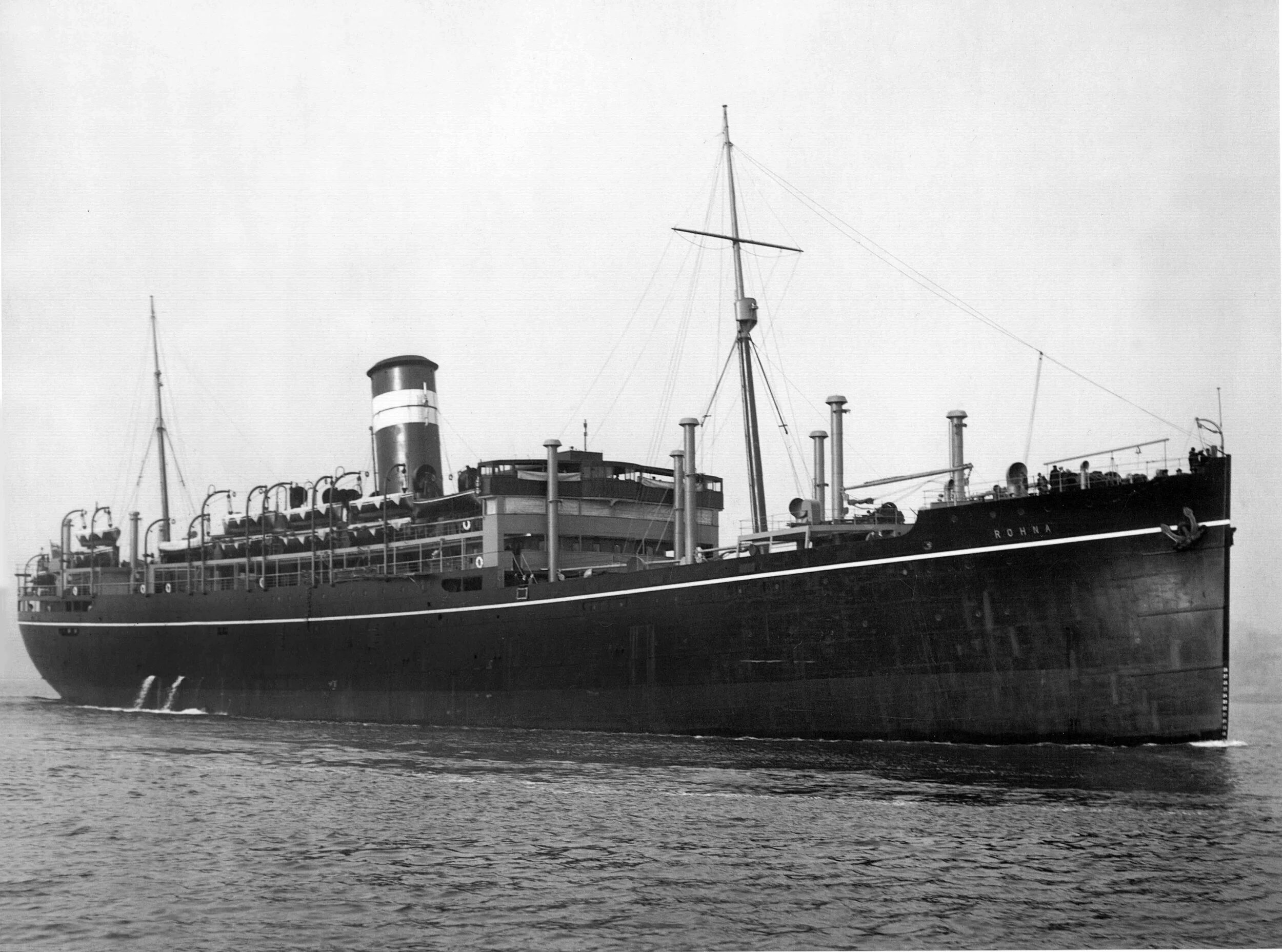

History

United Kingdom
- Name: Rohna
- Namesake: Rohna, Punjab
- Owner: British India SN Co
- Operator: British India SN Co
- Port of registry: (United Kingdom) London
- Builder: Hawthorn Leslie, Hebburn, England
- Yard number: 542
- Launched: 24 August 1926
- Completed: 5 November 1926
- Commissioned: 15 March 1941
- Identification: UK official number 149745; code letters KVLS (until 1933); Call sign GMSF (from 1934)
- Fate: Sunk by air attack 26 November 1943

General characteristics
- Tonnage: 8,602 GRT; tonnage under deck 6,681; 4,759 NRT; 9,400 LT DWT
- Length: 461.4 ft (140.6 m)
- Beam: 61.8 ft (18.8 m)
- Draught: 33 ft 0 in (10.06 m)
- Depth: 29.9 ft (9.1 m)
- Decks: 3
- Installed power: 984 NHP; 5,000 ihp
- Propulsion: 2 × quadruple expansion steam engines; twin screws
- Speed: 14.3 knots (26.5 km/h) top speed; 12.5 knots (23.2 km/h) cruising speed
- Capacity: 281 First Class; 33 Second Class; 100 Third Class; 5,064 deck passengers, reduced in 1931 to 3,851
- Crew: 195 (peacetime); 200 crew + 12 DEMS gunners (as troop ship)
- Sensors & processing systems: direction finding equipment
- Armament: (1943): 1 × 4 in (102 mm) naval gun; 1 × 3 in (76 mm) 12-pounder HA/LA gun; 6 × 20 mm (0.79 in) Oerlikon anti-aircraft guns; 2 × Hotchkiss guns; 2 × 2 0.5 in (12.7 mm) Lewis guns; 1 × 2 in (51 mm) Rocket Mounting Mk II ("pillar box"); 4 × FAMS; 2 × Unrotated Projectile launchers
- Notes: sister ship: Rajula

HMT Rohna was a British India Steam Navigation Company passenger and cargo liner that was built on Tyneside in 1926 as SS Rohna and requisitioned as a troop ship in 1940. ("HMT" stands for His Majesty's Transport.) Rohna was sunk in the Mediterranean in November 1943 by a Henschel Hs 293 guided glide bomb launched by a Luftwaffe aircraft. More than 1,100 people were killed, most of whom were US troops.

== Building ==
In 1925, British India Line ordered two new ships for its Madras–Nagapatam–Singapore service. They were sister ships but were built by different shipyards and had different engines. Hawthorn Leslie and Company built Rohna at its shipyard at Hebburn on Tyneside. Barclay, Curle and Company built Rajula in Glasgow on Clydeside. Both ships were launched and completed in 1926.

Rohna was launched on 24 August 1926 and completed on 5 November. She was named after a village in Sonipat, Punjab, India. She had 15 corrugated furnaces that heated five single-ended boilers with a combined heating surface of 14,080 square feet (1,308 m^{2}). These fed steam at 215 lb_{f}/in^{2} to two four-cylinder quadruple expansion steam engines, developing a total of 984 NHP. Each engine drove one of the ship's twin screws, giving Rohna 984 NHP or 5,000 ihp. She achieved 14.3 knots (26.5 km/h) on her sea trials and had a cruising speed of 12.5 knots (23.2 km/h).

By 1934, Rohna carried wireless direction finding equipment.

== Civilian service ==
Instead of taking up her Madras–Nagapatam–Singapore route immediately, Rohna spent her first six months of service taking military reinforcements to Shanghai. As a result, she did not start her intended service until June 1927.

=== Cyclone in Madras ===
On 31 October 1927, Rohna was moored to a buoy in Madras Harbour in India when a weather signal and falling air pressure warned of the approach of a tropical cyclone. Her Master, EG Carré, had her starboard anchor laid out with 90 fathoms (160 m) of cable, and got the engineers to raise steam so that her main engines could be started if needed.

By 0700 hrs on 1 November, a heavy swell was running within the harbour, at times lifting the four-ton mooring buoy completely out of the water. By 1100 hrs there was also heavy rain and Rohna's bridge ordered the engines to "stand by". Ten minutes later the anchor cable parted, shaking the ship. She was now dragging her port anchor, which Captain Carré therefore decided to have hauled in.

Weighing anchor would take about 20 minutes, so in the meantime Carré had Rohna get under way to avoid being run onto the harbour breakwater. Other ships were moored in the harbour, and Carré's helmsman had to steer through a narrow space between two of them in a very heavy sea. Eventually Rohna was able to make for the harbour mouth and put to sea and head 20 miles south to where the storm was less severe. Next day the cyclone had passed and Rohna returned to port.

=== Deck passengers ===
When new, Rohna was certified to carry 5,064 deck passengers. In 1931, new regulations called the Simla Rules (superseded in 1948 by the SOLAS Convention) reduced this to 3,851, but this was still more than any other UK-registered ship.

== War service ==
When the UK entered the Second World War in September 1939 Rohna was in the Indian Ocean. Apart from a voyage from Karachi to Suez with Convoy K 4, Rohna operated unescorted between Rangoon and Madras until late November. On 10 December she left Bombay for the Mediterranean, passing through the Suez Canal on 20–21 December and reaching Marseille on 26 December. From 3 January 1940 until 10 March she operated unescorted between Marseille and Port of Haifa in Mandatory Palestine, at first in convoys but after 29 January independently.

On 15 March 1940 Rohna returned through the Suez Canal to the Indian Ocean, where she operated unescorted between Bombay, Rangoon, and Colombo until June. In May she was requisitioned as a troop ship and on 6 June she left Bombay for Durban. She then ran between Durban, Mombasa, and Dar es Salaam until 28 July when she left Mombasa for Bombay.

Rohna took troops from Bombay to Suez in August 1940 in Convoy BN 3 and from Bombay to Port Sudan in September/October 1940 in Convoy BN 6. She made further trips from Bombay to Suez in November 1940 in Convoy BN 8A, from Colombo to Suez in February 1941 in Convoy US 8/1 and from Bombay to Singapore in March 1941 in Convoy BM 4. The day after the Iraqi coup d'état in April 1941 Rohna was ordered to Karachi, whence she took some of the first elements of Iraqforce to Basra in Convoy BP 2. During the Anglo-Iraqi War in May the ship made a second trip from Karachi to Basra in Convoy BP 5. After the Allied victory in Iraq at the end of May she spent the rest of the year running between Basra and Bombay, each time going to Basra in a BP-series convoys and returning independently.

On 8 December 1941 Japan invaded Malaya. A month later Rohna left Bombay for Singapore in Convoy BM 10, arriving on 25 January 1942. She left on 28 January in Convoy NB 1, a fortnight before Singapore was surrendered to Japan. From March 1942 Rohna spent a year criss-crossing the Indian Ocean between Bombay, Karachi, Colombo, Basra, Aden, Suez, Khorramshahr, Bandar Abbas, Bahrain, and Âbâdân; sometimes in convoys, but much of the time unescorted. In March 1943 she sailed from Bombay in Convoy BA 40 to Aden and then independently to Suez where she passed through the canal on 6–7 April.

For the remainder of her career Rohna supported the North African Campaign, the Allied invasion of Sicily and the Allied invasion of Italy. Until the beginning of July she ran independently between Alexandria, Tripoli and Sfax. From then on she sailed mostly in convoys, working between Alexandria, Malta, Tripoli, Augusta, Port Said, Bizerta, and Oran.

== Loss ==
Approximate position of Rohna's wreck off the coast of Algeria

At 12:30 on 25 November 1943, Rohna and four other troop ships left Oran in French Algeria. At sea three hours later they joined Convoy KMF 26 which was passing on its way from Britain to Alexandria.

About 16:30 the next day off Bougie the convoy was attacked by 14 Luftwaffe Heinkel He 177A heavy bombers escorted by Junkers Ju 88 aircraft, followed by between six and nine torpedo bombers. At the time, the convoy had a limited air escort of four land-based Free French Air Force Spitfires. Later in the course of the attack, they were relieved by RAF Spitfires.

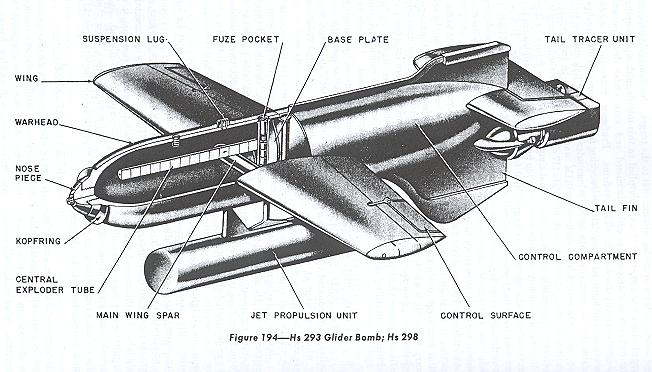
Henschel Hs 293 radio-guided glide bomb

The He 177As carried Henschel Hs 293 radio-guided, rocket-boosted glide bombs, almost 30 of which they launched at the convoy. The convoy's combined anti-aircraft fire seems to have impeded most of the attackers' attempts to guide their glide bombs onto their targets. Rohna's DEMS gunners contributed with her machine guns, Oerlikon autocannons, and about 20 rounds from her 12-pounder gun. The convoy shot down at least two aircraft and damaged several others.

Rohna was the only casualty. About 17:15 or 17:25 an He 177A piloted by Hans Dochtermann released a glide bomb that hit Rohna on her port side at the after end of her engine room and Number Six troop deck. Men poured on deck, many of them badly wounded.

The impact was about 15 feet (5 m) above the water line, but it flooded the engine room, knocked out all electrical equipment including her pumps, and set the ship ablaze. The impact demolished the number four bulkhead. It also destroyed six of her 22 lifeboats and forced out the plates of her hull so that none of her surviving port boats could be lowered past them. Troops cut the falls of some of the boats causing them to fall in the sea and be swamped. Only eight boats were launched; they became overloaded with troops and most became waterlogged or capsized. The number one deck serang (boatswain), Bhowan Meetha, helped the chief officer to launch the boats. Other members of the lascar crew launched the two aft lifeboats and abandoned ship without remaining to help to launch the other boats. With number four hold afire and all communications severed, the crewmen aft had lost contact with the bridge and had no way to reach the boat deck to help with the other boats. They disobeyed orders and acted on their own.

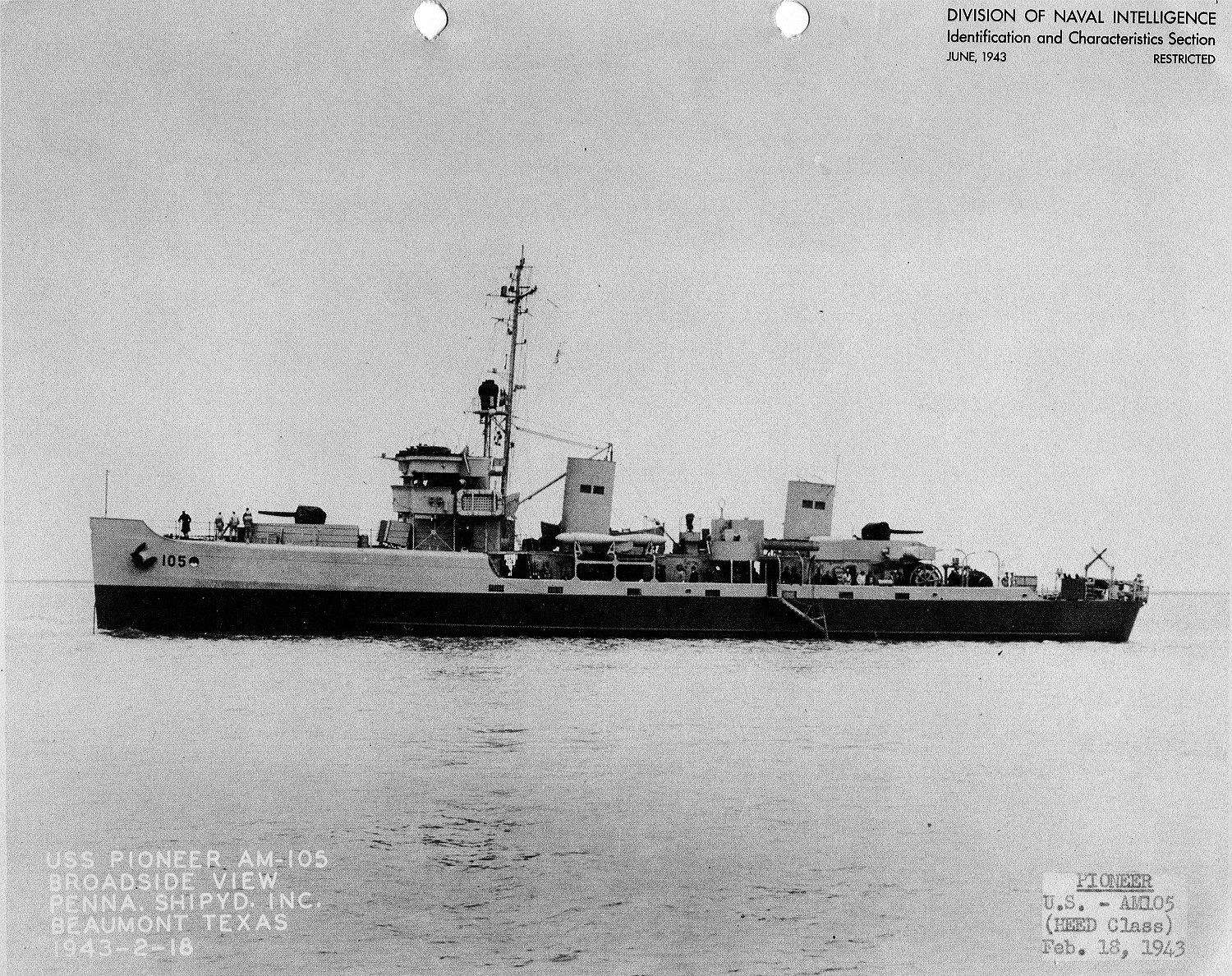
The minesweeper USS Pioneer rescued 602 survivors

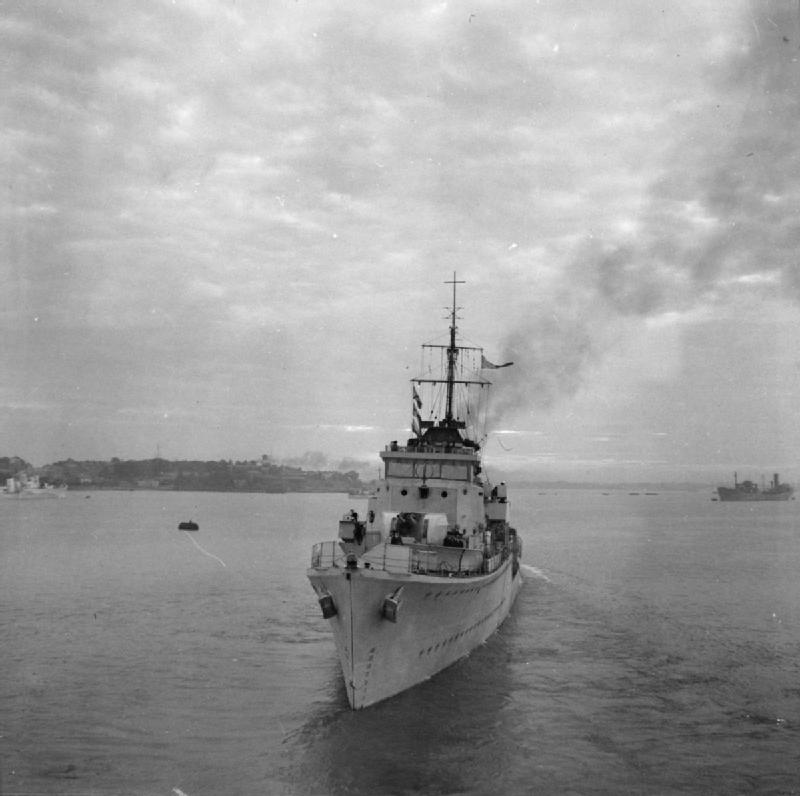
The destroyer HMS Atherstone provided anti-aircraft cover and then rescued about 70 survivors

As Rohna listed 12 degrees to starboard, her crew launched most of her 101 liferafts. By 17:50 only a few rafts remained so they took the hatch boards from number three hold and threw them overboard too. By now number four hold, just aft of the engine room, was on fire. The Auk-class minesweeper USS Pioneer and cargo ship Clan Campbell fell behind the convoy to rescue survivors, protected by the Hunt-class destroyer HMS Atherstone, which made a smokescreen and gave anti-aircraft cover. Clan Campbell had a high freeboard so she lowered a cargo net for survivors to use as a scramble net. The climb was about 30 feet (9 m) from the sea to the deck, which was difficult for many of the exhausted survivors. The wind was only Force 4, but there was a 15-to-20-foot (5 to 6 m) swell that prevented the rescue ships from launching their own boats.

Among the last people to leave the ship were her master, Captain TJ Murphy, the chief, second and third officers, the senior medical officer and four US soldiers. This group remained on the foredeck for about 30 minutes after the other soldiers and crew had abandoned ship. About 90 minutes after the missile hit the ship there was a rending noise, probably from the collapse of a bulkhead aft. Clouds of smoke came from number three hold and the ship settled by the stern. The group threw the last four rafts overboard and abandoned ship.

After night fell, Atherstone switched from anti-aircraft cover to rescuing survivors and the tug Mindful arrived from Bougie and joined the operation. The rescue continued until 02:15 on 27 November. In total, 819 survivors were taken to Philippeville: 602 on Pioneer, about 110 on Clan Campbell and about 70 on Atherstone.

Of the 1,138 men who were killed, 1,015 were US personnel. The attack is the largest loss of US troops at sea due to enemy action in a single incident. A further 35 US troops of the 2,000 originally embarked, later died from their wounds. As well as the troops, five of Rohna's officers and 117 of her 195 crew were killed, along with one of her 12 DEMS gunners and one hospital orderly. USS Pioneer rescued 606 survivors.

Details of the loss were revealed slowly over time. By February 1944 the US Government had acknowledged that more than 1,000 soldiers had been lost in the sinking of an unnamed troopship in European waters, but it hinted that a submarine was responsible. By June 1945 the US Government had released accurate casualty figures, the ship had been identified as Rohna, and the cause of the sinking had been identified as German bombers, but did not mention that a guided bomb was used. The use of an "aerial glider bomb" was first reported publicly on 14 November 1945 in an account of the battle in the Salt Lake City Tribune. On 9 March 1947 the Chicago Tribune published a complete account of the attack including the use of a "radio-controlled [sic] glider bomb." In 1948 a history of British India Line in the Second World War was published stating "the missile was one of the new glider bombs guided by wireless." The US Government officially released the remaining details of the incident, specifically that a radio-controlled glide bomb had been used, in 1967 after the passing of the Freedom of Information Act.

== Monuments ==
Members of Rohna's crew who were killed are commemorated in the Second World War section of the Merchant Navy War Memorial at Tower Hill in London. Her lascar seamen are commemorated in the Commonwealth War Graves Commission monuments at Chittagong and Mumbai. A monument to the US troops who were killed was unveiled at Fort Mitchell National Cemetery in Seale, Alabama in 1996. In 1962, the traffic median of the Esplanade in Bronx, New York, at the corner of Astor Avenue, was named in memory of Private Sidney Weissman, a local resident killed in the sinking of the Rohna. On 31 May 2021, a bridge in Gardner, Massachusetts was dedicated to honor US Cpl. Lawrence Lukasevicius, a Gardner resident who was one of the soldiers killed while on the Rohna.

== Controversy ==
In 1998 Dr James G. Bennett, who lost a brother in the sinking, published a book, The Rohna Disaster, through the self-publishing service Xlibris. In it he alleges that the heavy loss of life was due to the incompetence and cowardice of the Rohna's lascar crew and faulty safety procedures and equipment aboard.

In 2002 the History Channel released an episode of its History Undercover series, The Rohna Disaster: WWII's Secret Tragedy, that was based on Bennett's book and repeated his allegations. Wartime reports by the lieutenant colonel in command of the US troops aboard, and by Rohna's second officer and other survivors, contradict Bennett's allegations.

== See also ==
- List of ships sunk by missiles
- RMS Lancastria

== Sources ==
- Carré, Captain E.G. (1936). Through Stormy Seas: Some of the Spiritual Crises in My Life Afloat. Glasgow: Pickering & Inglis. pp. 57–63.
- Saunders, Hilary St George (1948). Valiant Voyaging: A Short History of the British India Steam Navigation Company in the Second World War 1939–1945. London: Faber and Faber.
- Wise, James E; Baron, Scott (2003). Soldiers Lost at Sea: A Chronicle of Troopship Disasters. Annapolis, Maryland: Naval Institute Press. pp. 146–147. ISBN 978-1-59114-966-8. "hmt rhona."
