= HMAS Air Sprite =

History

Australia (RAN)
- Ordered: 1958
- Builder: Lars Halvorsen Sons
- Laid down: 1959
- Commissioned: 15 June 1960
- Decommissioned: 1976
- Fate: Sunk as a target, 17 May 1979

General characteristics
- Displacement: 24 tons
- Length: 63 ft (19.2 m)
- Beam: 15.6 ft (4.8 m)
- Draught: 4 ft (1.2 m)
- Propulsion: 2 × Hall Scott Defender, twin screws, 1,260 shp
- Speed: 25 knots (46 km/h; 29 mph)
- Range: 200 mi (320 km)
- Complement: 6-8
- Armament: Light arms
- Notes: Taken from:

HMAS Air Sprite (Y 256/SAR 6301) was an air-sea rescue vessel operated by the Royal Australian Navy (RAN). She was an Australian-built version of the 63-foot (19 m) air-sea rescue vessels which the RAN operated during World War II, with the only difference being that she was fitted with a lattice mast instead of the tripod masts in the older ships. Air Sprite was ordered in 1958 and was built by Lars Halvorsen Sons in Sydney. She was commissioned into the RAN on 15 June 1960 and was based at HMAS Creswell at Jervis Bay near the RAN Fleet Air Arm's base, HMAS Albatross.

On the night of 10 February 1964 Air Sprite was one of two air-sea rescue vessels which responded to the collision between HMAS Melbourne and Voyager in Jervis Bay. Air Sprite rescued 36 Voyager crewmen and HMAS Air Nymph saved a further 34.

In 1976 Air Sprite was laid up at HMAS Kuttabul in Sydney for a major refit, which was scheduled for mid-1977, prior to being used as a general purpose vessel in Western Australia. This refit did not go ahead, and instead the ship was marked for disposal. Air Sprite was sunk as a target by a Tartar missile fired by HMAS Brisbane on 17 May 1979.

== See also ==
- List of ships sunk by missiles
