= USS Pioneer (AM-105) =

Minesweeper of the United States Navy

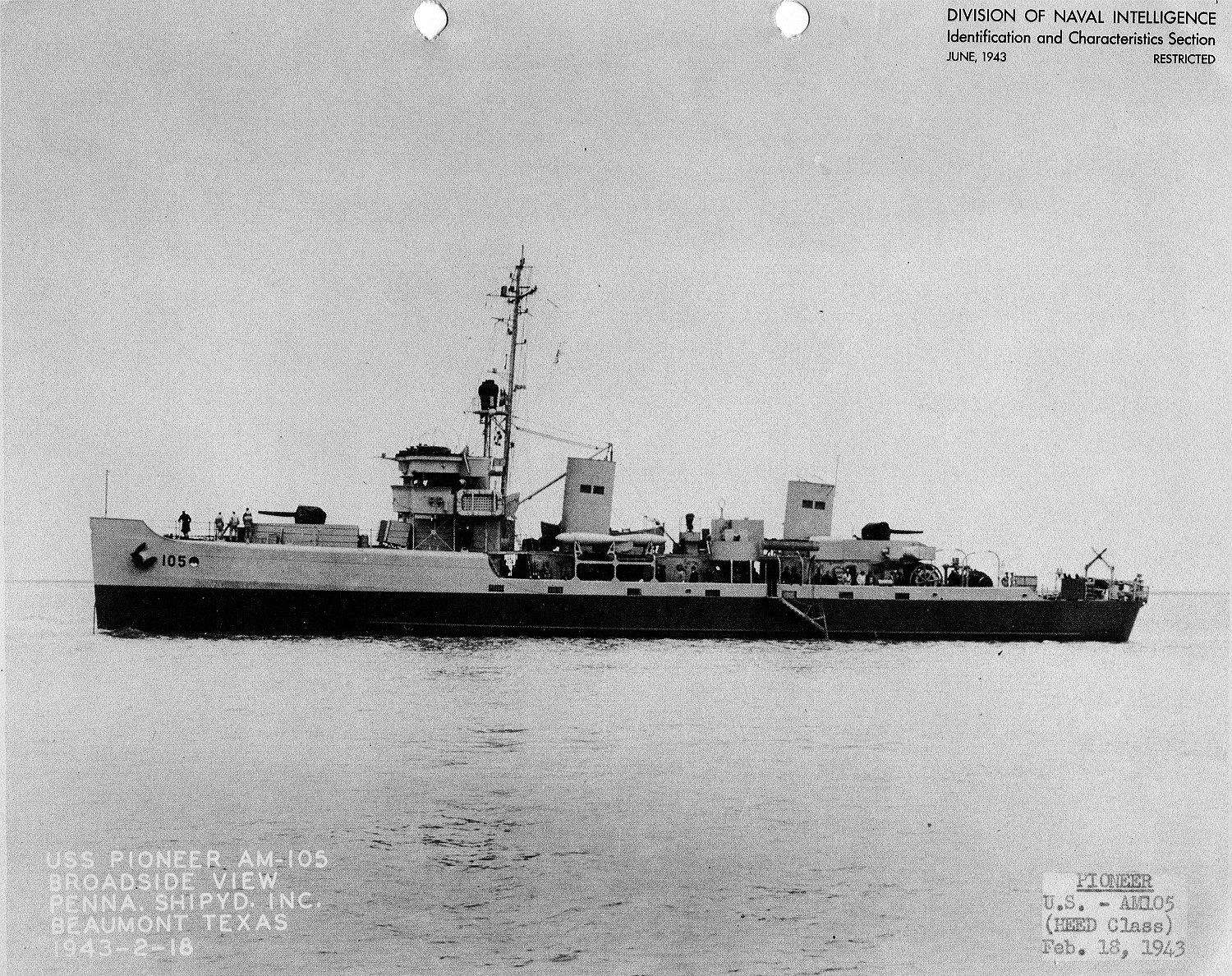

History

United States
- Name: USS Pioneer (AM-105)
- Builder: Pennsylvania Shipyards Inc., Beaumont, Texas
- Laid down: 30 October 1941
- Launched: 26 July 1942
- Commissioned: 27 February 1943
- Decommissioned: 8 July 1946
- Reclassified: MSF-105, 7 February 1955
- Stricken: 1 July 1972
- Honours and awards: 4 battle stars (World War II)
- Fate: Sold to Mexico, 1972

History

Mexico
- Name: ARM Leandro Valle (C70)
- Namesake: Leandro Valle Martínez
- Acquired: 19 September 1972
- Reclassified: G01
- Reclassified: P101, 1993
- Decommissioned: retired from service by 2004
- Fate: Sunk in 2006 by Mexican Navy

General characteristics
- Class & type: Auk-class minesweeper
- Displacement: 890 long tons (904 t)
- Length: 221 ft 3 in (67.44 m)
- Beam: 32 ft (9.8 m)
- Draft: 10 ft 9 in (3.28 m)
- Speed: 18 knots (33 km/h; 21 mph)
- Complement: 100 officers and enlisted
- Armament: 1 × 3"/50 caliber gun; 2 × 40 mm guns; 2 × 20 mm guns; 2 × Depth charge tracks

USS Pioneer (AM-105) was an Auk-class minesweeper acquired by the United States Navy for the dangerous task of removing mines from minefields laid in the water to prevent ships from passing.

Pioneer was a U.S. Navy oceangoing minesweeper, named after the word "pioneer," which is defined as a person or group that originates or helps open up a new line of thought or activity or a new method or technical development.

Pioneer was laid down 30 October 1941 by Pennsylvania Shipyards, Inc., Beaumont, Texas; launched 26 July 1942; sponsored by Mrs. H. R. Jessup; and commissioned 27 February 1943.

== Convoy assignment ==
Pioneer trained her crew and experimented with newly developed gear in the Gulf of Mexico, Chesapeake Bay, and the Potomac River before joining a Mediterranean-bound convoy at New York City on 14 May 1943, for the first of four escort voyages from New York or Norfolk, Virginia, to North African ports. In November she took up patrol and escort duty within the Mediterranean.

On 26 November 1943, while bound east from Oran, Pioneer's convoy was attacked by German bombers. They hit a British troopship HMT Rohna (with over 2,000 US servicemen aboard) and set her afire; Pioneer stood by, continuing to fire on the attacking aircraft while conducting the rescue of 606 soldiers and crewmen from Rohna. The ship (with its crew of roughly 100 sailors), however, was never given any recognition for the rescue of over 600 HMT Rohna survivors. To this day (June, 2007), The Rohna Survivors Organization continues to try to have the Pioneer recognized for this extraordinary rescue operation.

== Operations in the invasion of Italy ==
She protected critically important Allied convoys in the Mediterranean until assigned to the assault force for the Anzio operation early in January 1944. After training at Salerno, her group sortied from Naples on 21 January to sweep a mile-wide channel into the fire support and transport areas, and then swept these areas themselves. When the transports entered the newly cleared area, Pioneer began antisubmarine and antiaircraft patrol, and then resumed escort duties, bringing reinforcements to Anzio on 24 January.

Desperate German resistance by land and air as well as from the sea prevented a breakout from Anzio. Pioneer guarded the beleaguered beachhead, patrolling to seaward, escorting supply and reinforcement movements, and sweeping mines dropped by enemy planes intent on isolating the beachhead by sea as it was by land. She returned to wider-ranging escort assignments when advancing Allied land forces broke through to Anzio late in May.

== Operations in invasion of France ==
On 12 August, Pioneer sortied for the invasion of southern France. Again minesweepers led the way, clearing the assault area, ignoring shore battery attacks while completing their complex and vital task. Patrol and sweeping operations included extensive activity to prepare newly captured Marseille to receive shipping.

== World War II Pacific operations ==
Pioneer sailed from Bizerte on 24 November for stateside overhaul preparatory to Pacific deployment, for which she left Norfolk, Virginia, 15 February 1945, bound for Panama en route to Hawaii. Arriving Pearl Harbor on 18 March after underway training, Pioneer installed new radar gear and joined in exercises before getting underway for Okinawa on 23 May. Calls en route delayed her arrival until 7 August. For the remainder of the year, Pioneer joined in the gigantic task of clearing Japanese and Chinese waters of the thousands of mines laid in a decade of warfare.

== Decommissioning and sale ==
Peaceful use of the oceans restored, Pioneer returned to San Pedro, California, 14 February 1946 to inactivate. She decommissioned and went into reserve at San Diego, California, 8 July 1946. She was redesignated MSF-105 on 7 February 1955. Struck from the Navy Register on 1 July 1972, the ship was sold to Mexico on 19 September 1972.

== Awards ==
Pioneer received 4 battle stars for World War II service.

== Mexican Navy service ==
On 19 September 1972, the former Pioneer was sold to the Mexican Navy and became ARM Leandro Valle (C70), the lead ship of the Mexican Navy's Valle class of offshore patrol vessels. Her pennant number was later changed to G01, and in 1993, was changed for the final time to P101. Leandro Valle was retired from service by 2004. According to divers on a trip to Mexico, the ship was sunk by the Mexican navy in June 2006.
