= USS LST-79 =

LST-1-class landing ship tank

History

United States
- Name: LST-79
- Builder: Jeffersonville Boat and Machine Co., Jeffersonville
- Laid down: 28 February 1943
- Launched: 8 May 1943
- Sponsored by: Mrs. Virginia Lee Hughes
- Commissioned: 7 July 1943
- Fate: Transferred to Royal Navy

History

United Kingdom
- Name: LST-79
- Commissioned: 17 July 1943
- Stricken: 11 October 1943
- Fate: Sunk by Luftwaffe, 30 September 1943

General characteristics
- Class & type: LST-1-class tank landing ship
- Displacement: 4,080 long tons (4,145 t) full load; 2,160 long tons (2,190 t) landing
- Length: 328 ft (100 m) oa
- Beam: 50 ft (15 m)
- Draft: Full load: 8 ft 2 in (2.49 m) forward; 14 ft 1 in (4.29 m) aft; Landing at 2,160 t: 3 ft 11 in (1.19 m) forward; 9 ft 10 in (3.00 m) aft
- Installed power: 2 × 900 hp (670 kW) Electro-Motive Diesel 12-567A diesel engines; 1,700 shp (1,300 kW)
- Propulsion: 1 × Falk main reduction gears; 2 × Propellers
- Speed: 12 kn (22 km/h; 14 mph)
- Range: 24,000 nmi (44,000 km; 28,000 mi) at 9 kn (17 km/h; 10 mph) while displacing 3,960 long tons (4,024 t)
- Boats & landing craft carried: 2 or 6 x LCVPs
- Capacity: 2,100 tons oceangoing maximum; 350 tons main deckload
- Troops: 16 officers, 147 enlisted men
- Complement: 13 officers, 104 enlisted men
- Armament: Varied, ultimate armament; 2 × twin 40 mm (1.57 in) Bofors guns; 4 × single 40 mm Bofors guns; 12 × 20 mm (0.79 in) Oerlikon cannons

USS LST-79 was a LST-1-class tank landing ship in the Royal Navy during World War II.

== Construction and career ==
LST-79 was laid down on 28 February 1943 at Jeffersonville Boat and Machine Co., Jeffersonville, Indiana. Launched on 8 May 1943 and commissioned on 7 July 1943. The ship was later transferred to the Royal Navy and commissioned on 17 July 1943. The ship was assigned 9th LST Flotilla.

She was sunk by a German Henschel Hs 293 guided missile while off Ajaccio Harbor, Corsica, 30 September 1943.

LST-79 was struck from the Navy Register on 11 October 1943.

== Sources ==
- United States. Dept. of the Treasury (1962). Treasury Decisions Under the Customs, Internal Revenue, Industrial Alcohol, Narcotic and Other Laws, Volume 97. U.S. Government Printing Office.
- Moore, Capt. John (1984). Jane's Fighting Ships 1984-85. Jane's Information Group. ISBN 978-0710607959.
- Saunders, Stephen (2009). Jane's Fighting Ships 2009-2010. Jane's Information Group. ISBN 978-0710628886.
- Fairplay International Shipping Journal Volume 222. United Kingdom: Fairplay Publishing Limited. 1967.
