= Henschel Hs 293 =

German WWII anti-ship glide bomb

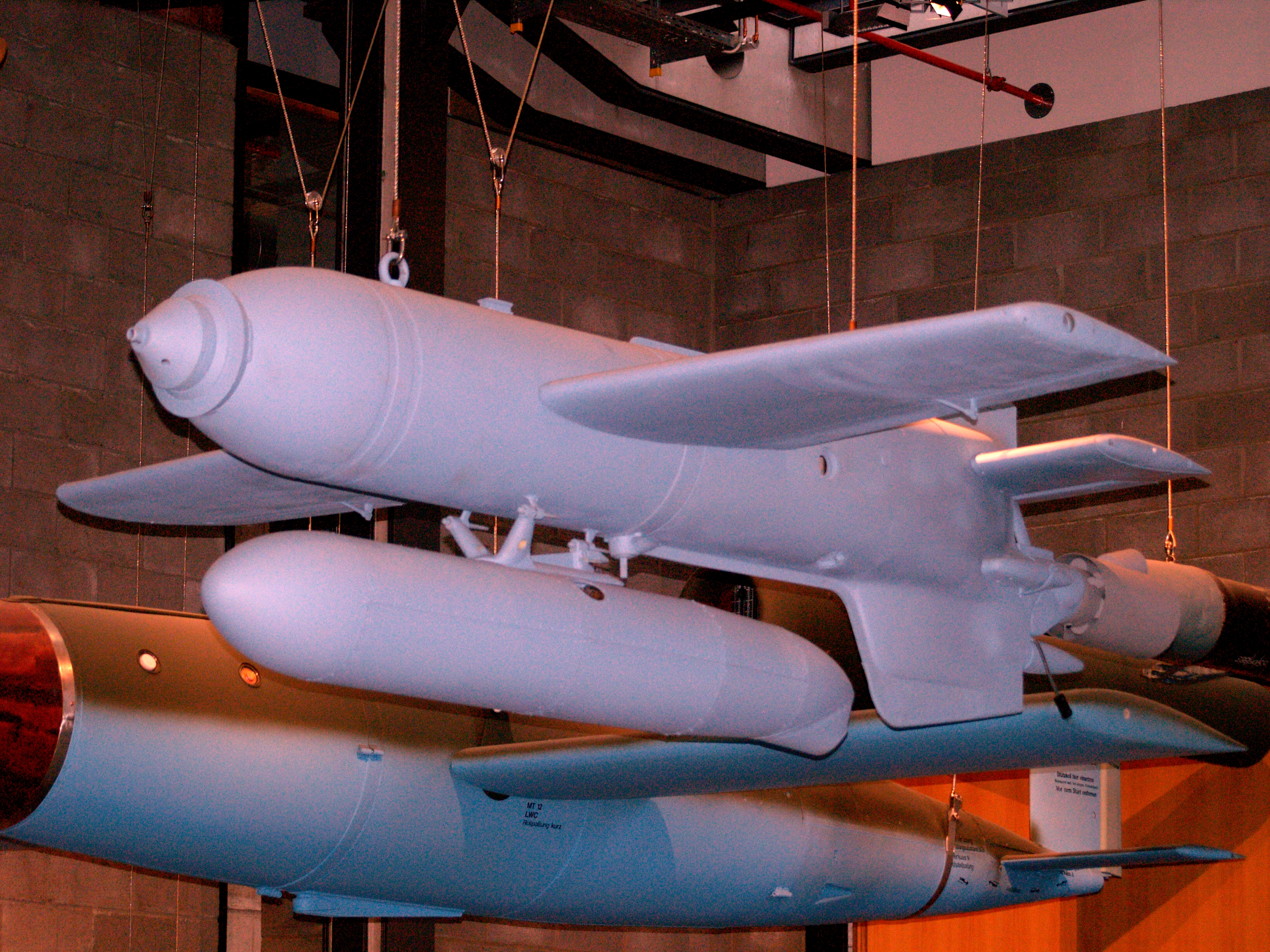
- Hs 293 on display at the Deutsches Technikmuseum in Berlin, Germany, with added "Kopfring" (lit. "head ring") on the nose for nautical targets
- Type: Anti-ship glide bomb
- Place of origin: Nazi Germany

Service history
- In service: 1943–1945
- Used by: Luftwaffe
- Wars: World War II

Production history
- Designer: Herbert A. Wagner
- Designed: 1940–1943
- Manufacturer: Henschel Flugzeug-Werke AG
- Produced: 1942 - 1945
- No. built: 1,000

Specifications
- Mass: 1,045 kilograms (2,304 lb)
- Length: 3.82 metres (12.5 ft)
- Width: 3.1 metres (10 ft)
- Diameter: 0.47 metres (1.5 ft)
- Warhead: explosive
- Warhead weight: 295 kilograms (650 lb)
- Engine: liquid-propellant rocket HWK 109-507 motor, 5.9 kN (1,300 lb_{f}) thrust for 10 s; subsequently glided to target
- Operational range: at 2.2 kilometres (7,200 ft) altitude: 4 kilometres (13,000 ft) at 4 kilometres (13,000 ft) altitude: 5.5 kilometres (18,000 ft) at 5 kilometres (16,000 ft) altitude: 8.5 kilometres (28,000 ft)
- Maximum speed: maximum: 260 metres per second (850 ft/s) average: 230 metres per second (750 ft/s)
- Guidance system: Kehl-Strassburg FuG 203/230; MCLOS using a joystick

The Henschel Hs 293 was a World War II German radio-guided glide bomb. It is the first operational anti-shipping missile, first used unsuccessfully on 25 August 1943 and then with increasing success over the next year, damaging or sinking at least 25 ships. Allied efforts to jam the radio control link were increasingly successful despite German efforts to counter them. The weapon remained in use through 1944 when it was also used as an air-to-ground weapon to attack bridges to prevent the Allied breakout after D-Day, but proved almost useless in this role.

== Development ==
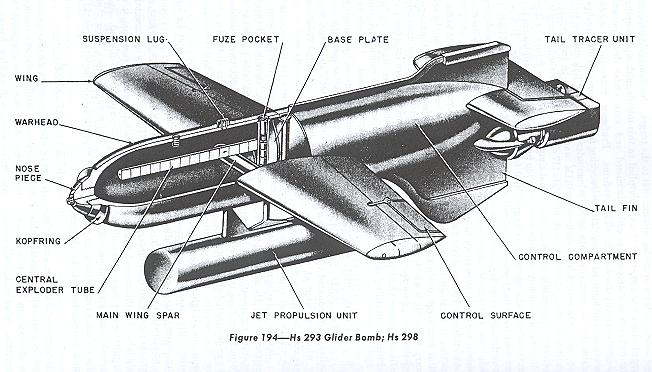
A schematic drawing of a Hs 293

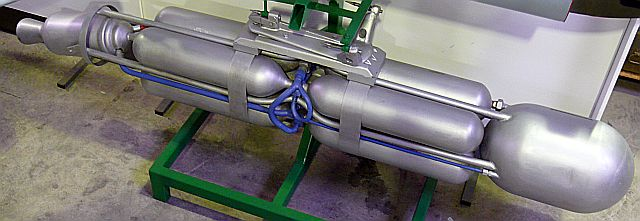
The Walter 109-507 rocket motor unit with propellant tanks, removed from its nacelle under the Hs 293

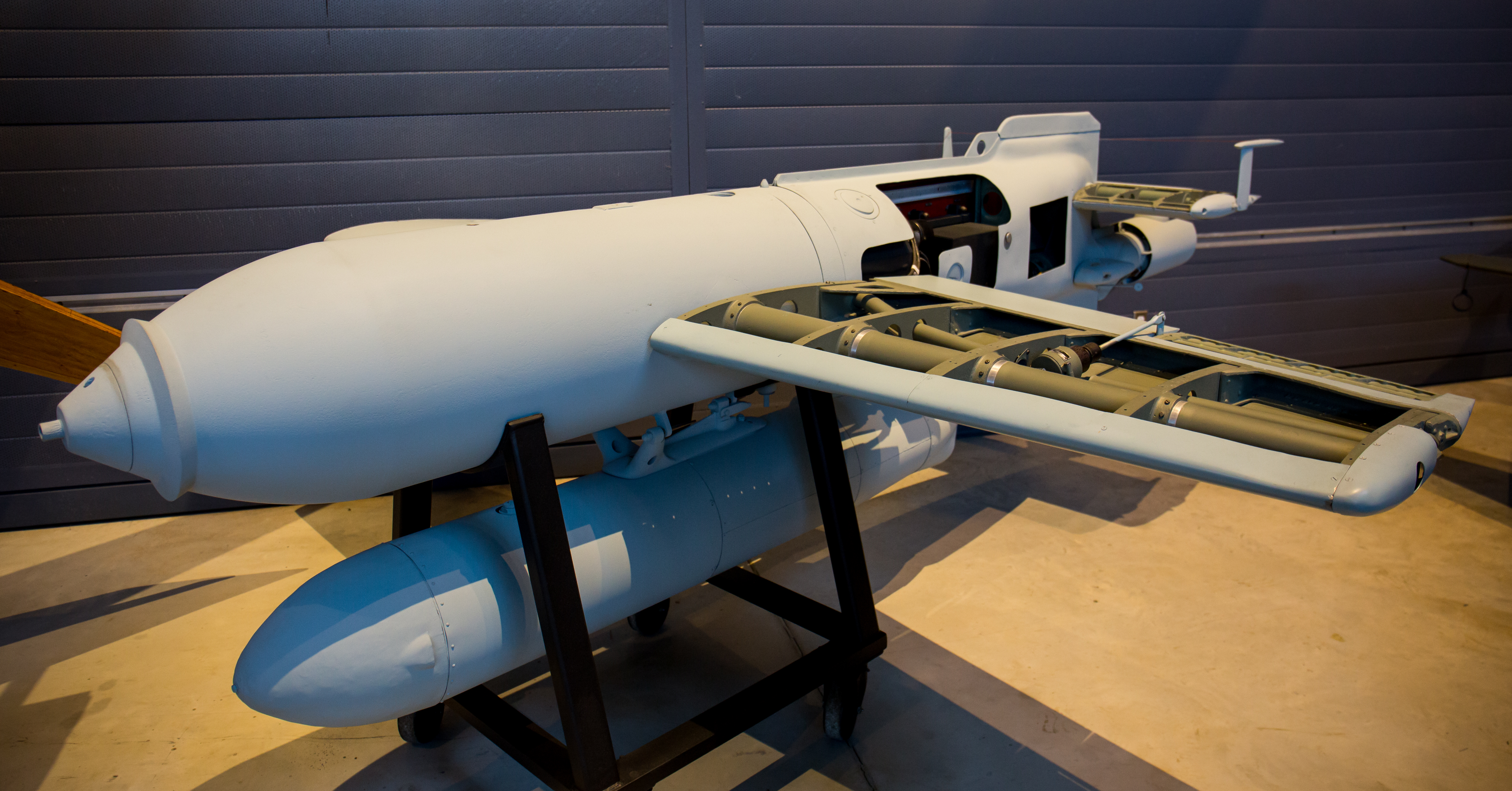
An Hs 293 A-1 on display at the Udvar-Hazy Center

The Hs 293 project started in 1940, based on the Gustav Schwartz Propellerwerke pure glide bomb, designed in 1939. The Schwartz design did not have terminal guidance; instead, it used an autopilot to maintain a straight course. It was intended to be launched from a bomber at sufficient standoff distance from anti-aircraft fire. A Henschel team, under Herbert A. Wagner, developed it the following year by adding a Walter HWK 109-507 rocket engine underneath, providing 590 kgf (1,300 lbf; 5.8 kN) thrust for ten seconds. This allowed the bomb to be used from a lower altitude and at an increased range. Some examples used a BMW 109-511 engine, with 600 kgf (1,300 lbf; 5.9 kN) of thrust.

The first flights took place between May and September 1940, with unpowered drops from Heinkel He 111 aircraft; the first Walter rocket-powered tests had been conducted by the end of 1940.

The weapon consisted of a modified standard 500 kg (1,100 lb) Sprengbombe-Cylindrisch-class SC 500 general purpose bomb with an added "Kopfring" on the nose for maritime use, to help ensure a relatively perpendicular axis of impact, with a thin metal shell and a high explosive charge inside, equipped with a rocket engine beneath the bomb, a pair of aileron-fitted wings, and the receiving FuG 230 component of the Kehl-Straßburg MCLOS guidance and control system, shared with the contemporary Fritz X armour piercing guided glide bomb. The elevator was operated with an electrically powered jackscrew as the only proportional control, while the ailerons were operated with solenoids. Remote control was provided through the Kehl-Straßburg link, with the Hs 293's control setup having no movable rudder on the ventral tailfin. The 109-507 monopropellant booster rocket provided for only a short burst of speed, making range dependent on the launch altitude.

The Hs 293 was intended to destroy unarmoured ships, unlike the Fritz X. Five coloured flares were attached to the rear of the weapon to make it visible at a distance to the operator. During night operations flashing lights instead of flares were used.

After the missile was launched, the bomber flew parallel to the target so as to be able to maintain a slant line of sight.

=== Electronic countermeasures ===
The Allies put considerable effort into developing devices which jammed the radio link between Kehl transmitter and Straßburg receiver. Jammers aboard U.S. Navy destroyer escorts were ineffective at first, as the frequencies selected were incorrect. On balance, the probability that an Hs 293 launched (and seen as responding to operator guidance) would strike a target (or achieve a damage-inflicting near-miss) was about the same at the Battle of Anzio as it was during Operation Avalanche.

As attacks were taking place at Anzio, the United Kingdom began to deploy its Type 650 transmitter, which employed a different approach to interfering with the FuG 203/230 radio link, by jamming the Straßburg receiver's intermediate frequency section, which operated at 3 MHz. This appears to have been quite successful, especially because the operator did not have to attempt to find which of the eighteen selected Kehl-Straßburg command frequencies were in use and then manually tune the jamming transmitter to one of them. The Type 650 defeated the receiver no matter which radio frequency had been selected.

Following several intelligence coups, including a capture of an intact Hs 293 at Anzio and recovery of important components of the Kehl transmitter from a crashed Heinkel He 177 on Corsica, the Allies were able to develop far more effective countermeasures, in time for the invasion of Normandy and Operation Dragoon. These included AIL's Type MAS jammer, which employed sophisticated signals to defeat the Kehl transmission and to take over command of the Hs 293, steering it into the sea via a sequence of right-turn commands. In contrast to the experience at Anzio, the jammers seemed to have had a major impact on operations after April 1944, with significant degradation observed in the probability that a Hs 293 missile could achieve a hit or damaging near miss.

To improve control of the weapon and reduce vulnerability of the launching aircraft, wire-guided Hs 293B and television-guided Hs 293D variants were planned; neither was operational before the war ended. There was also a tailless delta winged Hs 293F. In addition, there was a Hs 293H air-to-air model. Over 1,000 were built, from 1942 onwards. The closest Allied weapon system in function and purpose to the Hs 293 series was the US Navy's Bat unpowered, autonomously radar-guided unit.

=== Later developments ===
The Hs 293 served as the basis for a number of developments, none completed. These included the Hs 294, "designed specifically to penetrate the water and strike a ship below the waterline", with a long, conical shaped forebody and a pair of the Hs 293A's standard Walter HWK 109-507 booster engines at the wing roots; the Hs 295, with longer fuselage, larger warhead and Hs 294 wings; the Hs 296, with Hs 294 afterparts, Hs 295 warhead and Hs 293 Kehl-Straßurg MCLOS control systems.

== Operational history ==
U.S. military intelligence datasheet on the Henschel Hs 293

On 25 August 1943, an Hs 293 was used in the first successful attack by a guided missile, striking the sloop HMS Bideford; the warhead did not detonate, and the damage was minimal. On 27 August, the sinking of the British sloop HMS Egret by a squadron of 18 Dornier Do 217 carrying Hs 293s led to anti-U-boat patrols in the Bay of Biscay being temporarily suspended. On 26 November, an Hs 293 sank the troop transport HMT Rohna killing over 1,000 personnel.

Other ships sunk or damaged by the Hs 293 include:

- HMCS Athabaskan, Tribal-class destroyer (heavily damaged by confirmed hit with Egret in Bay of Biscay 27 August 1943)
- Italian destroyer Ugolino Vivaldi (heavily damaged and scuttled off Sardinia on 10 September 1943)
- SS Bushrod Washington (sunk 14 September 1943 during Operation Avalanche)
- SS Delius (damaged)
- HMS Dulverton, Hunt-class destroyer (heavily damaged and scuttled)
- SS Elihu Yale (sunk off Anzio during Operation Shingle 16 February 1944 – LCT 35 alongside was also destroyed)
- USS Herbert C. Jones (damaged off Anzio during Operation Shingle 15 February 1944)
- SS Hiram S. Maxim (damaged)
- HMS Inglefield, I-class destroyer leader (sunk)
- SS James W. Marshall (damaged 15 September 1943 during Operation Avalanche and subsequently used as part of the Mulberry harbour – possibly hit by a "Fritz X")
- HMS Janus, J-class destroyer (sunk—possibly by an Hs 293, Fritz X or a torpedo)
- HMS Jervis (damaged off Anzio during Operation Shingle 23 January 1944)
- SS John Banvard (damaged)
- Banff-class sloop HMS Landguard (slightly damaged with Bideford in Bay of Biscay 25 August 1943)
- HMS LST-79 (sunk)
- USS LST-282 (sunk during Operation Dragoon)
- HMS Lawford (sunk—probably by an Hs 293, official report states "aerial torpedo")
- MV Marsa (sunk)
- HMCS Matane (damaged)
- USS Mayo (damaged—possibly by an Hs 293 or a mine)
- HMHS Newfoundland, a hospital ship carrying Red Cross markings at the time (heavily damaged and later scuttled by US Navy destroyer Plunkett)
- USS Prevail (damaged—possibly by an Hs 293)
- HMS Rockwood (damaged slightly, later written off)
- SS Samite (damaged)
- SS Samuel Huntington (sunk off Anzio during Operation Shingle 29 January 1944)
- SS Selvik (damaged)
- HMS Spartan (sunk off Anzio during Operation Shingle 29 January 1944)
- USS Tillman (slightly damaged 6 November 1943 while escorting Mediterranean convoy KMF-25A) although more likely a torpedo was the cause)

Although designed for use against ships, it was also used in Normandy in early August 1944 to attack bridges over the Sée and Sélune rivers. One bridge was slightly damaged for the loss of six of the attacking aircraft. The attack on 7 August 1944 at Pontaubault, by Do 217 of III./KG 100, was the first usage of a standoff missile against a land target. (Note: On 28 May 1944, 113 American GB-1 autopiloted glide bombs were launched from B-17 bombers against railway yards at Cologne; 42 reached the target) On 12 April 1945 Hs 293A bombs were used once more, against bridges on the Oder, by Do 217 bombers of KG 200.

The Hs 293 was carried on Heinkel He 111, Heinkel He 177, Focke-Wulf Fw 200, and Dornier Do 217 planes. Only the He 177 (of I and II.Gruppen/KG 40), certain variants of the Fw 200 (of III./KG 40) and the Do 217 (of II./KG 100 and III./KG 100) used the Hs 293 operationally in combat.

== Variants ==
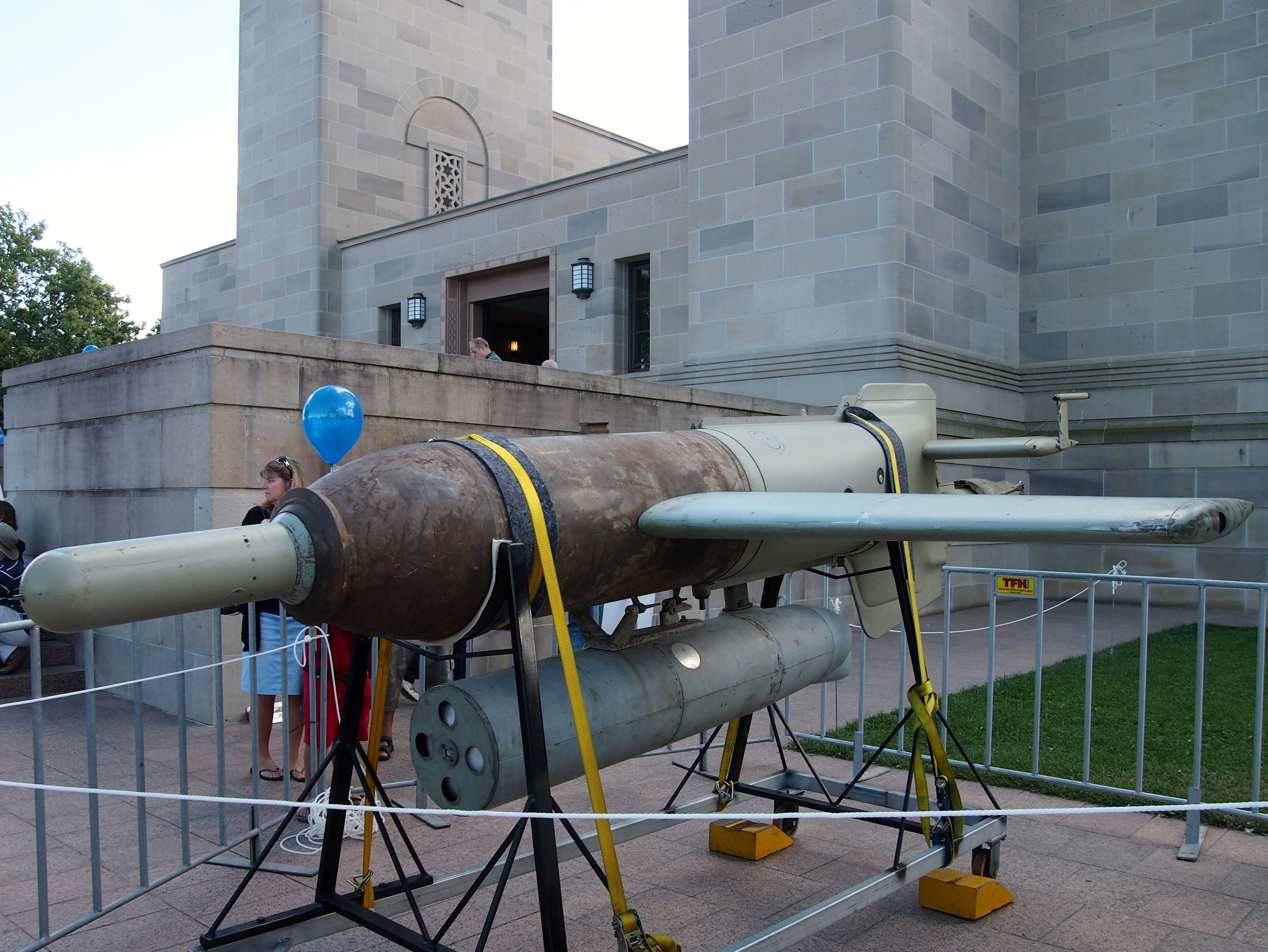
Henschel Hs 293B guided bomb on display at the 2013 Australian War Memorial open day

- Hs 293A-0, the first production version.
- Hs 293A-1, main production version
- Hs 293A-2, steel construction rather than aluminium.
- Hs 293A-v5 A-1 with shortened wings.
- Hs 293B wire-guided to prevent jamming; although jamming would eventually make the Hs 293 ineffective, it was never put into production.
- Hs 293C (production version designated Hs 293A-2) had the detachable warhead of the Hs 294.
- Hs 293D was television-guided, with a large Yagi antenna transmitting back to the launch aircraft. Seventy were built and tested, but it was never used operationally.
- Hs 293E, an experimental model to test spoiler controls as a replacement to ailerons; never put into series production. This modification was put into the final version of the Hs 293A-2 but by then the Luftwaffe had no aircraft available for anti-shipping operations and it was never deployed.
- Hs 293F, a tailless delta-wing variant; never got further than the design phase.
- Hs 293H, an experimental variant designed to be launched from one aircraft and controlled from another. Abandoned because allied air superiority had reached the point where it was felt that the second aircraft would be unable to remain in the vicinity of the ship for long enough. Used the Schmidding solid-fuel rocket motor. It was also considered as an anti-aircraft missile.
- Hs 293-U6, the short wingspan variant, fitted with a solid fuel motor and intended for launching from the Arado Ar 234 jet bomber at 720 km/h (447 mph). The missile did not proceed past the design stage.

== Operators ==
- Luftwaffe

== See also ==
- List of World War II guided missiles of Germany
- Azon - gravity-propulsion American 1,000 lb. laterally-steerable guided ordnance
- Henschel Hs 294 – further development of the Hs 293
- Kampfgeschwader 100, the pioneering PGM-deployment bomber wing of the Luftwaffe

== Bibliography ==
- Munson, Kenneth (1978). German Aircraft Of World War 2 in colour. Poole, Dorset, UK: Blandford Press. ISBN 0-7137-0860-3.
