= Kehl-Strasbourg radio control link =

German WWII munition control system

The Kehl-Straßburg radio control link was a German MCLOS radio control system of World War II. The system was named for Strasbourg, the French/German city on the Rhine and Kehl, at the time a suburb of Strasbourg. It was used by the Fritz X guided bomb and the Henschel Hs 293 guided missile, and would also be trialled in test of the Henschel Hs 298 MCLOS-guidance air-to-air missile.

== Description ==
The generic term Funkgerät, the source for the FuG prefix, translates directly into "radio equipment" in English (funk - radio; gerät - equipment), and also prefixed the designations of other various types of German military electronics, like the Lichtenstein and Neptun airborne intercept radar series, and the Erstling IFF radio gear, among others.

The Kehl-Straßburg system combined two units. The dual-axis, single-joystick-equipped Funkgerät (FuG 203) Kehl series of radio-control transmitter sets, fitted aboard the launch aircraft, were used to send the control signals to the ordnance, with the ordnance device itself picking up the signals through a Funkgerät (FuG 230) Straßburg receiver after release.

== Electronic countermeasures ==
The Kehl-Straßburg control link relied on radio contact between the bomb or missile and the guidance unit. As a result, it was highly susceptible to electronic countermeasures. After the initial attacks in August 1943 the Allies went to considerable effort to develop devices which jammed the 48.2 MHz to 49.9 MHz low-VHF band radio link between the Kehl transmitter aboard the launching aircraft and the Straßburg receiver embedded in either the Hs 293 or the Fritz X ordnance. Early efforts by the U.S. Naval Research Laboratory (NRL) produced the XCJ jamming transmitter, installed aboard the destroyer escorts USS Herbert C. Jones and Frederick C. Davis in late September 1943. The XCJ was ineffective because the frequencies selected for jamming were incorrect. This was updated in time for Operation Shingle, leading to the XCJ-1, which was installed aboard destroyer escorts Frederick C. Davis and Herbert C. Jones, as well as destroyers Woolsey, Madison, Hilary P. Jones, and Lansdale. These six ships rotated service at Anzio, with three deployed at any time. The manually operated jamming system met with some success, though it proved cumbersome and was easily overwhelmed if large numbers of weapons were deployed simultaneously.

In early 1944, the UK began to deploy its Type 650 transmitter, which employed a different approach. This system jammed the Straßburg receiver's intermediate frequency section, which operated at a 3 MHz frequency and appears to have been quite successful, especially because the operator did not have to attempt to find which of the 18 Kehl-Straßburg command frequencies were in use and then manually tune the jamming transmitter to one of them. The Type 650 automatically defeated the receiver, regardless which radio frequency had been selected for an individual missile, be it Fritz X or Hs 293.

Following several intelligence coups, including a capture of an intact Hs 293 at Anzio and recovery of important Kehl transmitter components from a crashed Heinkel He 177 on Corsica, the Allies were able to develop far more effective countermeasures in time for the invasion of Normandy and Operation Dragoon. This included an updated XCJ-2 system from NRL (produced as the TX), the modified airborne AN/ARQ-8 Dinamate system from Harvard's Radio Research Laboratory, NRL's improved XCJ-3 model (produced as the CXGE), the Types MAS system produced by the Airborne Instruments Laboratory (at the time affiliated with the Radio Research laboratory), the British Type 651, and the Canadian Naval Jammer.

Perhaps most impressive of all was AIL's Type MAS jammer, which employed sophisticated signals to defeat the Kehl transmission and to take over command of the Hs 293, steering it into the sea via a sequence of right-turn commands, triggering its solenoid-operated ailerons.

Even more sophisticated jammers from NRL, designated XCK (to be produced as TY and designated TEA when combined with the upgraded XCJ-4) and XCL, were under development but were never deployed as the threat had evaporated before they could be put into service.

In contrast to the experience at Anzio, jammers seemed to have had a major impact on operations after April 1944, with significant degradation observed in the probability that a Hs 293 launched at a target (and responding to operator guidance) would achieve a hit or damage-causing near miss.

== Counter countermeasures ==
In case of a heavy jamming attack against the radio control, the Germans used a wired remote control system. It could easily be swapped in place against the radio system. In the plane radio transmitter S203 was swapped against the audio amplifier S207. In the weapon, VHF receiver E230 was replaced by audio receiver E237. Both plane and bomb were equipped with a dual wire reel each, giving a maximum distance of 12 km. Wire remote control system was developed by Staßfurter Rundfunk GmbH
