= Cheb Airfield =

Cheb Airfield Letiště Cheb
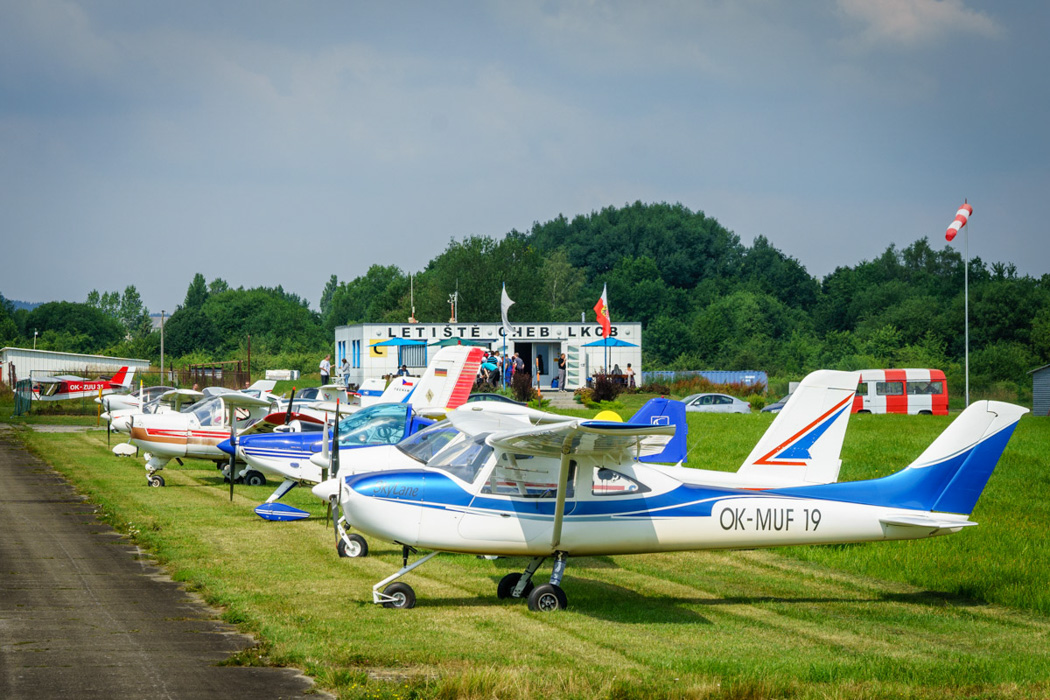
- Cheb Airfield
- IATA: none; ICAO: LKCB

Summary
- Airport type: sport
- Owner: Town of Cheb
- Operator: Aeroklub Karlovy Vary o.s.
- Serves: Cheb
- Location: Cheb
- Elevation AMSL: 483 m / 1,585 ft
- Coordinates: 50°03′58″N 12°24′41″E
- Website: www.letistecheb.cz

Map
- Location of airport in Czech Republic

Runways
Direction	Length		Surface
Direction	m	ft	Surface
05/23	1,000	3,280	Grass
06/24	1,000	3,280	Concrete

Cheb Airfield (Czech: Letiště Cheb; ICAO: LKCB) is an airport in Cheb in the Czech Republic. It is the oldest airport in the country.

== History ==
The aerodrome was built during World War I to serve needs of the Austro-Hungarian Army. In 1918, when Czechoslovakia was created, it was the only working airfield in the country. The first airplanes for the newly formed Czechoslovak Army were obtained from here. Later, the army set up a pilot training center next to the airfield.

During World War II Germans built a large aircraft factory (Eger Flugzeugwerke GmbH) next to the airfield. The factory repaired and produced parts Heinkel He 111, Heinkel He 177, Heinkel He 219 and Messerschmitt Me 262. American bombing at the end of war destroyed the aerodrome and the factory, with one of the military airfield's circular concrete dispersal areas at its periphery being the "final resting place" for the He 177 V101 four-engined prototype heavy bomber, apparently wrecked there at the war's close.

At the airfield is also located the VOR/DME station (call sign OKG).

The airfield was reopened 19 August 2010 as public domestic aerodrome and operational availability is VFR DAY. The original concrete runway 06/24 is repaired in the length of 1000 m and width of 18 m. The grass runway 05/23 is 1000 m long and 25 m wide.
