= Heinkel He 177 Greif =

German heavy bomber during WW2

He 177 Greif
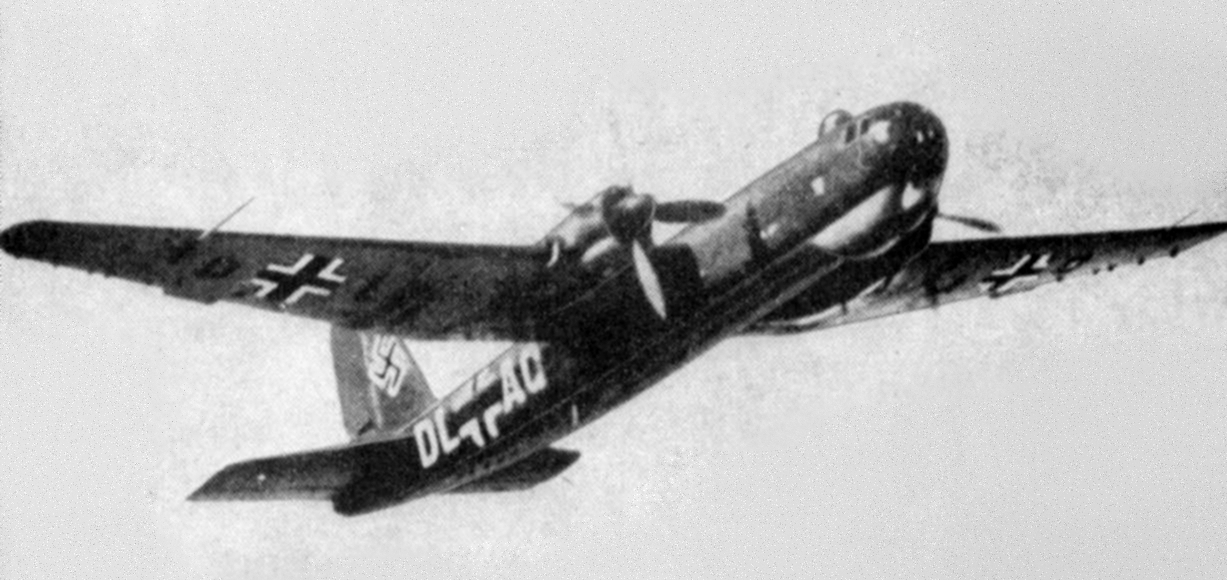
- The second He 177A-0 production prototype (A-02) with broad-bladed propellers, bearing radio code "DL+AQ"

General information
- Type: Long-range heavy bomber
- Manufacturer: Heinkel Flugzeugwerke; Licensed to Arado
- Primary user: Luftwaffe
- Number built: 1,169

History
- Introduction date: 1942
- First flight: 19 November 1939
- Retired: 1945
- Variants: Heinkel He 274; Heinkel He 277

The Heinkel He 177 Greif (Griffin) was a long-range heavy bomber flown by the Luftwaffe during World War II. The introduction of the He 177 to combat operations was significantly delayed by problems both with the development of its engines and frequent changes to its intended role. Nevertheless, it was the only long-range, heavy bomber to become operational with the Luftwaffe during the conflict. The He 177 had a payload/range capability similar to that of four-engined heavy bombers used by the Allies in the European theatre.

Work on the design began in response to a 1936 requirement known as Bomber A, issued by the Reichsluftfahrtministerium (RLM) for a purely strategic bomber. Thus, the He 177 was intended originally to be capable of a sustained bombing campaign against Soviet manufacturing capacity, deep inside Russia.

In contrast to its heavy payload and very wide, 30 metres (98 ft) planform, the specifications called for the design to have only two very powerful engines. To deliver the power required, the He 177 needed engines of at least 2,000 horsepower (1,500 kW). Engines of this type were new and unproven at the time. The Daimler-Benz DB 606 power system that was selected, in conjunction with its relatively cramped nacelles, caused cooling and maintenance problems, such that the powerplants became infamous for catching fire in flight, and contributing to the He 177 gaining nicknames from Luftwaffe aircrew such as Reichsfeuerzeug ("Reich's lighter") or Luftwaffenfeuerzeug ("Air Force lighter").

The type matured into a usable design too late in the war to play an important role. It was built and used in some numbers, especially on the Eastern Front, where its range was particularly useful. The He 177 is notable for its use in mass raids on Velikiye Luki in 1944, one of the late-war heavy bombing efforts by the Luftwaffe. It saw considerably less use on the Western Front, although the type played a role during Operation Steinbock (the "Baby Blitz") against the British mainland in 1944.

== Design and development ==
=== Background ===
During the mid 1930s, Generalleutnant Walther Wever, a longtime advocate of strategic bombing, pressed the Luftwaffe to develop a dedicated long-range bomber for the role of attacking the Soviet Union's factories in the Ural Mountain area. This concept was received with significant skepticism amongst many senior officials within the Luftwaffe and, by 1936, this "Ural bomber" program had delivered two rather uninspiring designs, the Dornier Do 19 and Junkers Ju 89.

Wever continued to press for new designs for this role, and the Reichsluftfahrtministerium (RLM) finally released a new specification for what they called Bomber A on 3 June 1936. This called for a significantly more advanced design with higher speeds, longer range and larger payloads. This was also the same day that Wever was killed in an air crash, and the design lost its only politically powerful champion.

The specification required the plane to carry a bomb-load of at least 1,000 kg (2,200 lb) over a range of 5,000 km (3,100 mi), with a maximum speed of not less than 500 km/h (311 mph) at altitude. In addition to outperforming, by a considerable margin, any bomber then in service, the design's speed was intended to allow it to outrun any contemporary fighter, the so-called Schnellbomber concept.

On 2 June 1937, Heinkel Flugzeugwerke received instructions to proceed with construction of a full-scale mock-up of its Projekt 1041 Bomber A. Heinkel Flugzeugwerke's estimated performance figures for Projekt 1041 included a top speed of 550 km/h (342 mph) at 5,500 m (18,050 ft) and a loaded weight of 27,000 kg (59,500 lb). In order to achieve these estimates, Ernst Heinkel's chief designer, Siegfried Günter, employed several revolutionary features.

=== Engines ===
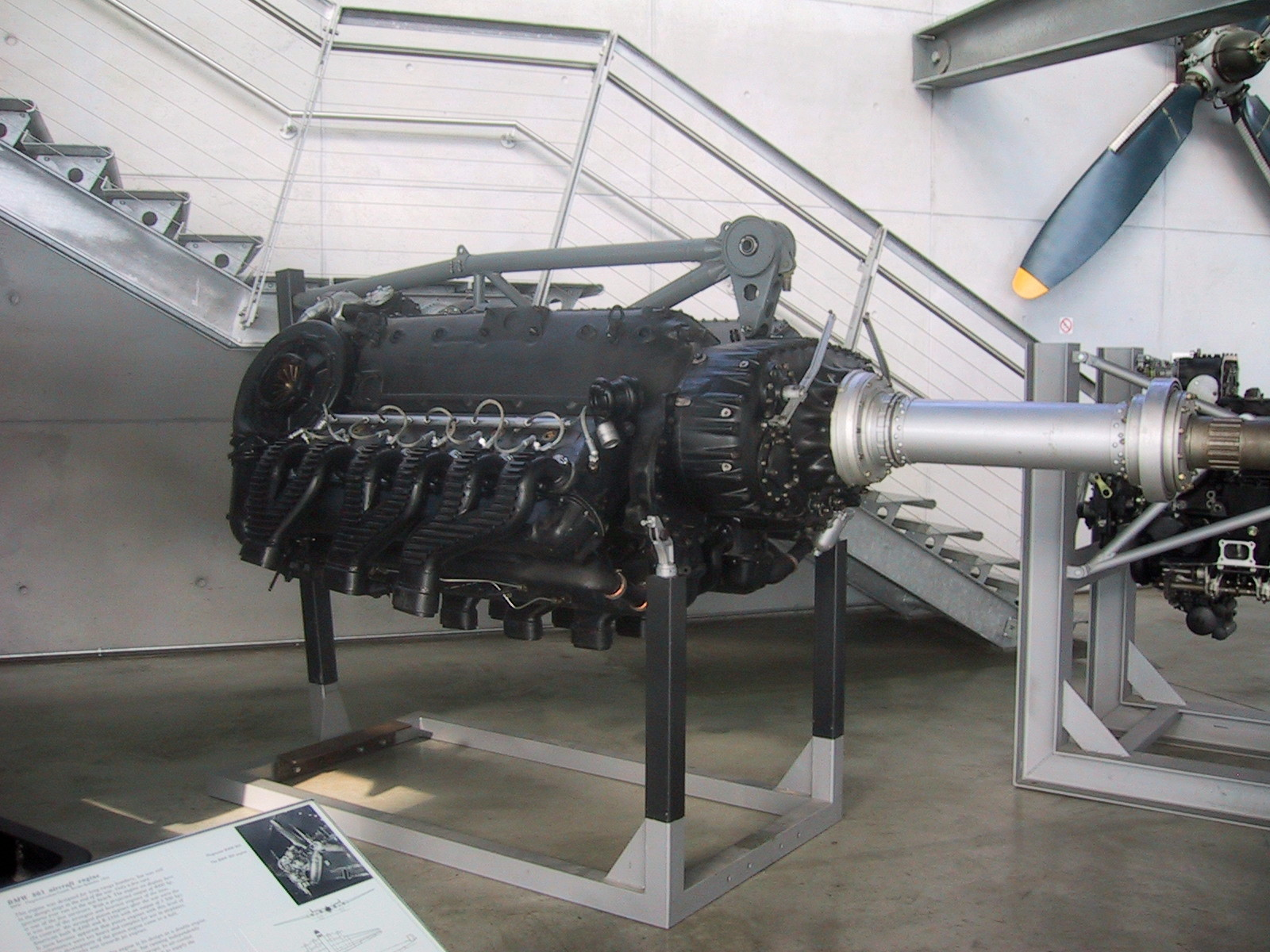
A later DB 610 "power system" which equipped the He 177A-5. The DB 606A/B powerplants were similar in configuration, with outermost "pair" of engine mount forgings not shown.

The He 177 required at least a pair of 2,000 PS (1,973 hp, 1,471 kW) engines to meet performance requirements. No engine in the German aviation power-plant industry at that time developed such power. A four-engine version would have been possible with engines like the Daimler-Benz DB 601 but the four-engine layout would impose higher propeller drag to the detriment of performance in dive bombing. The use of only two counter-rotating propellers on a heavy bomber offered many advantages, such as a substantial reduction in drag, reduction of dive instability and a marked improvement in maneuverability. The eight initial V-series prototypes, and the larger number of A-0 pre-production models of the He 177, displayed an airspeed and maneuverability comparable to many heavy fighters of the time.

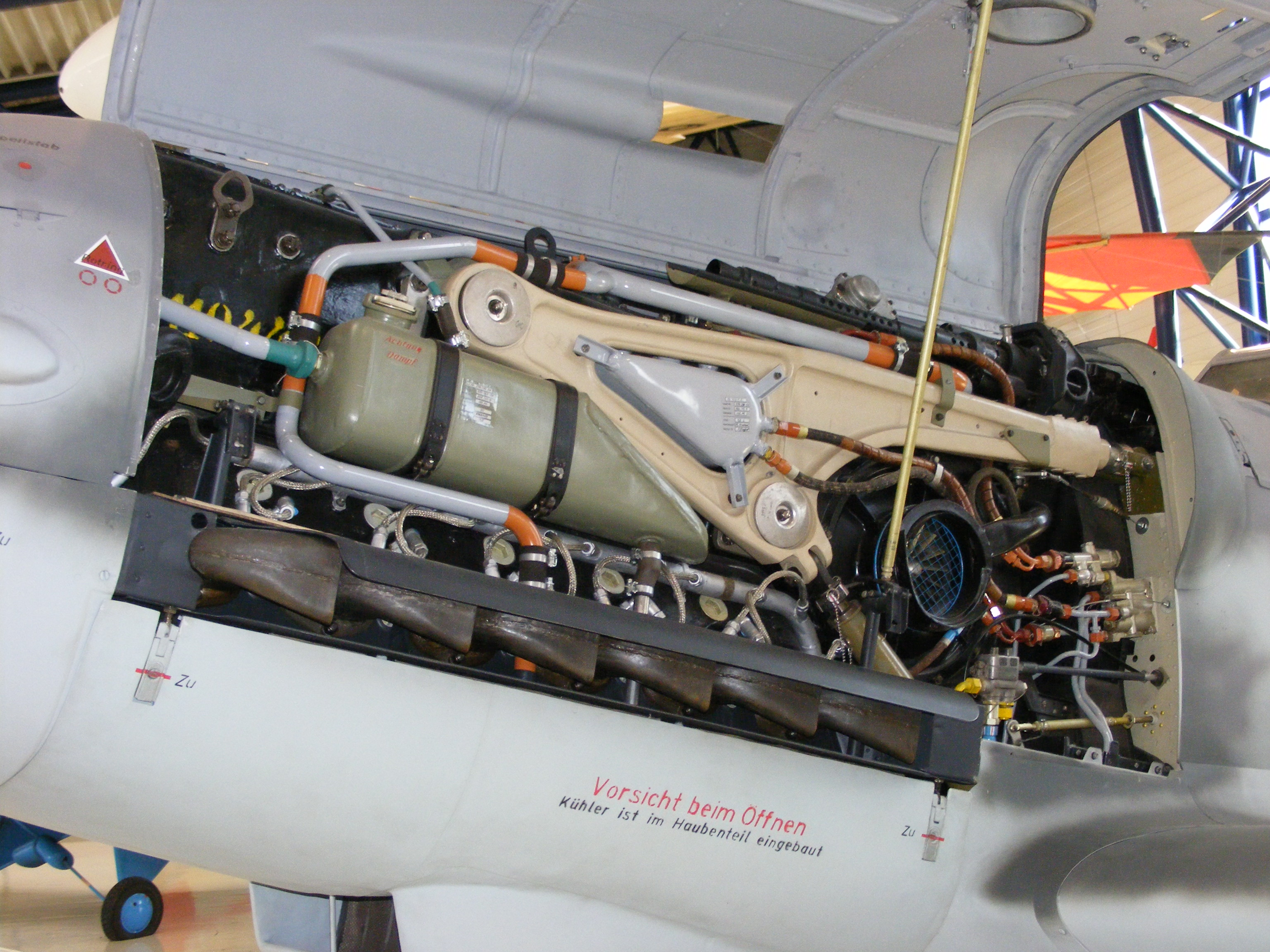
Portside view of a DB 605 engine in a Bf 109G's nose - the visible engine mount forging was similar to what each side of the DB 606/610 used, along with the "power system's" special centreline mounting unit.

For the He 177, Günter decided to employ two of the complex Daimler-Benz DB 606 "power system" setups for propulsion. He had already employed these engines on the record-breaking Heinkel He 119 reconnaissance aircraft prototypes. They consisted of a pair of DB 601 liquid-cooled 12-cylinder inverted-vee inline engines mounted side by side in a nacelle – for the He 119, centrally within the fuselage, just behind its heavily glazed cockpit enclosure – driving one propeller. The two engines were inclined inwards by 30° when mounted onto either side of their common, vertical-plane space-frame primary engine mount so that the inner cylinder banks were disposed almost vertically. A common gear-housing connected the front ends of the two crankcases, with the two crankshaft pinions driving a single airscrew shaft gear. The outer sides of each of the component engines' crankcases were connected to the nacelle firewall through forged mountings similar to what would be used for either a single DB 601 or DB 605 engine-powered aircraft installation. When combined with the central space-frame mount designed especially for the "power system" format, this resulted in a Daimler-Benz "coupled" twin-crankcase "power system" having a trio of engine mount structures within its nacelle accommodation. The starboard DB 601 component engine had to be fitted with a mirror-image version of its mechanically driven centrifugal supercharger, drawing air from the starboard side of the engine. Two of the DB 606s, each of which initially developed 2,600 PS (2,564 hp, 1,912 kW) for take-off and weighing some 1,515 kg (3,340 lb) apiece, were to power the He 177. The DB 606 — and its eventual replacement, the Daimler-Benz DB 605-based "DB 610" — were to be the only two production German aviation powerplants designed to surpass 2,040 PS (2,010 hp, 1,500 kW) of power, something that the Germans had considerable challenges in developing during the war into production-ready, combat-reliable aviation engines.

=== Surface evaporation cooling vs. conventional annular radiators ===
For aerodynamic cleanliness, Günter intended to dispense with the usual system of drag-producing engine radiators and planned on using a surface evaporative cooling system instead. Such surface cooling, in the form of simpler surface radiators, had been used on British high-speed racing seaplanes as early as 1929. This sort of system was pioneered on the eight examples built of the Heinkel He 119 high-speed reconnaissance aircraft prototype series, already flying with the twin-crankcase DB 606 "power system" engine with success from the beginning, and was also intended for use on the He 100 high-speed fighter prototypes. The coolant water is pressurized, raising its boiling point, in this case to about 110 °C (230 °F). As the superheated water leaves the engine it enters an expansion area where the pressure drops and the water flashes to steam. The steam is then cooled by running it in pipes along the outer skin of the fuselage and wings. Before the design of the He 177 was finalized, it was clear that such a system would be incapable of dealing with the vast amount of heat generated by each of the twinned DB 601-based powerplants, forcing the abandonment of the idea of using evaporative cooling systems, in favour of conventional annular radiators fitted directly behind each propeller. These resembled, but were larger in capacity, than those fitted to the Junkers Ju 88 A bomber, and added to the He 177's weight and drag.

=== Defensive armament ===
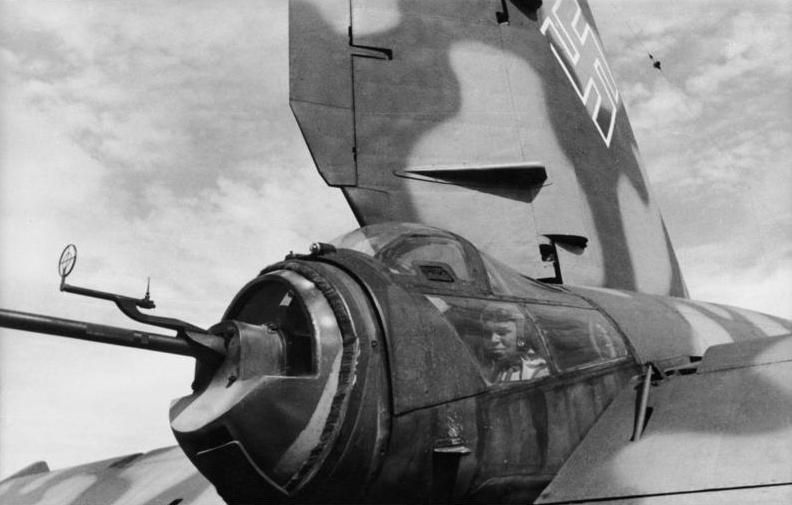
He 177A-5 tail gun position, with 20mm MG 151 cannon and bulged upper glazing for upright gunner's seating.

Günter's original intention had been to equip the He 177 with three cockpit-controlled remote gun turrets, with two of them to come from the Junkers Ju 288 program, leaving one manned emplacement in the tail. Compared with the manned position, a remotely controlled, turreted defensive armament emplacement system traded technical complexity for reduction of size, weight and drag; it had the advantage that the gunner could be placed in a protected position, with the best possible view and with less risk of being blinded by the flash from his own guns. Although work on remotely controlled aircraft defensive systems had reached a relatively advanced stage in Germany in the late 1930s, progress in this field within Germany's aviation and armaments systems engineers and manufacturers was to prove insufficient to keep pace with the He 177. As a result, the He 177 had to be modified to accommodate larger and heavier manned positions, such as the manned rear dorsal turret usually fitted to almost all examples of the Greif, armed with a 13 mm MG 131 machine gun. That installation meant that the fuselage had to receive structural strengthening in several locations. Most of the later production aircraft did receive a remote forward dorsal turret, the Fernbedienbare Drehlafette (translated as "Remotely operated rotating gun-mount" and abbreviated "FDL") 131Z, armed with two MG 131 machine guns, located at a point on the fuselage directly above the wing root's leading-edge, with its rotating hemispherical sighting station dome located a short distance forward of the turret and slightly offset to starboard, just behind the forward cabin area.

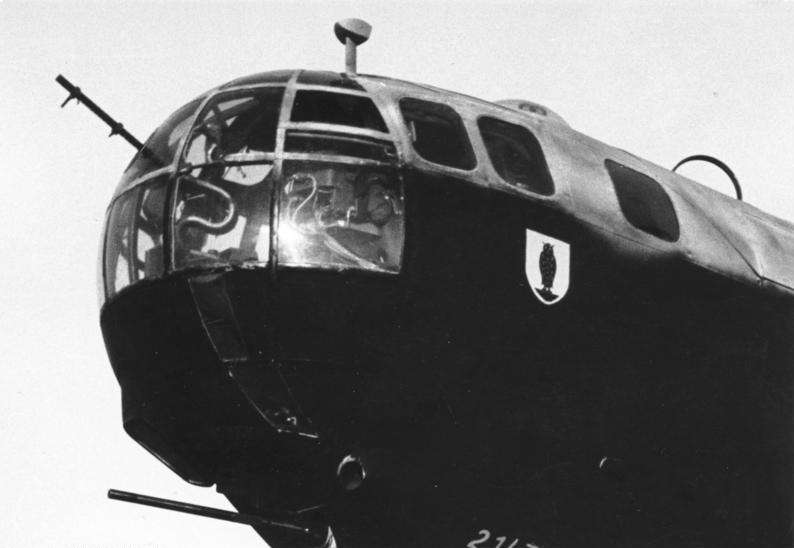
Integrated into its "Cabin-3" cockpit design, a 7.92 mm MG 81 was placed in a flexible mount to defend against frontal attacks; the two lower rows of nose glazing panels are painted over to protect the crew from searchlight glare.

A compact tail gun position was fitted for rearward defense, armed with one MG 131 machine gun but its streamlined glazing meant that the gunner lay prone, severely restricting his comfort on long missions. A revised tail gun position with a bulged upper glazing was fitted to the He 177A-3 and later models, which permitted the gunner to sit upright. The revised design required a reduction of the lower end of the rudder surface for clearance. The MG 131 gun would often be replaced with a 20 mm MG 151 cannon or in a few instances, a semi-experimental twin MG 131Z mount, with the twinned 13 mm calibre guns mounted one above the other, at the rear of the standard bulged upper glazing emplacement. Usually, a 7.92 mm MG 81 machine gun in a flexible mount was positioned in the upper starboard side of the cockpit nose glazing for defense against frontal attacks. The undernose, inverted-casemate Bola gondola (a common ventral armament fitment on many German bombers), which was the full width of the fuselage where it emerged from under the nose and centered under the forward cabin, usually had a flexibly mounted, drum-fed 20 mm MG FF cannon at the front end as added forward defense and a flexibly mounted MG 81 machine gun in the rear, for the initial He 177A-1. An MG 151 cannon replaced the forward MG FF cannon in later production models, with an MG 131 usually replacing the MG 81, for rearwards ventral defense.

=== Wing ===
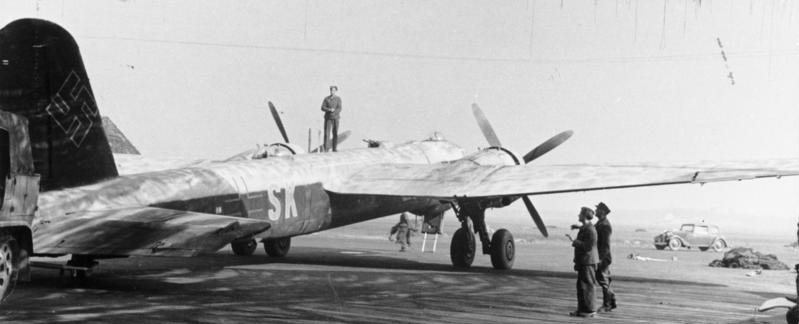
He 177A-3 Suzy of 2./KG 100, 1944. Note the flaps cover the entire trailing edge.

The He 177 had Fowler-type extensible trailing edge flaps, which covered the trailing edge of the wing, including those portions covered by ailerons. Each aileron comprised upper and lower portions, the latter arranged to slide rearwards with flap extension, while the upper part retained its function of providing lateral control for take-off and landing. The original wing design did not fully take into account the stresses resulting from the operation of the Fowler flaps. A Rechlin report dated 9 October 1942 stated:

"The examination has shown that the strength of the He 177's wings is one-third below that estimated by Heinkel. The reason for this is the uneven rigidity of the individual members with consequent deformation under load. This condition was not recognized by Heinkel at the proper time, the failure tests having been undertaken too late in view of the size of the structure."

Tests on the 40th production A-1 aircraft in September 1942, revealed serious outer wing panel component damage after only some 20 flights, due to the aerodynamic stress from diving attack exercises. Costly and extensive strengthening was needed to solve the problem, which significantly increased the aircraft's weight. Starting with the later versions of the He 177A-3, the Fowler flaps along the outboard wing sections were no longer fitted and a strengthened wing design was introduced on the He 177A-5.

=== Dive bombing ===
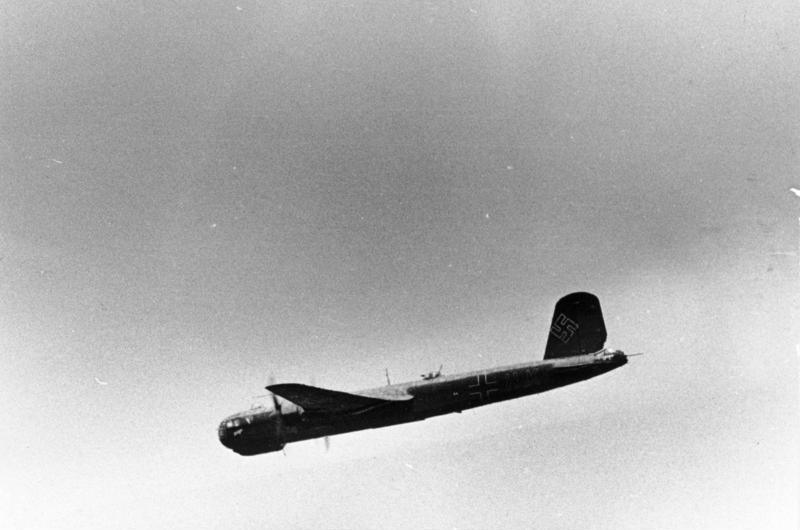
An He 177 in a shallow dive. The He 177 was meant to have dive-bombing capabilities.

The inaccuracy of horizontal bombing during the Ural bomber program demonstrated weaknesses in German bombsights and created doubts about the effectiveness of level bombing of factories. While Wever had been advocating the Ural Bomber concept, others in the Luftwaffe were growing increasingly interested in dive bombing.

Diving on the target greatly increases the accuracy of the drop, allowing pin-point attacks on small targets like bridges and ships. Technical data supported the accuracy of Stuka bombing achieving greater target destruction over Dornier Do 17s or Heinkel He 111s. The experience of the Condor Legion in Spain tended to support the idea that dive bombing was superior and led some to believe that pinpoint accuracy was possible. Ernst Udet became a vocal supporter of this concept.

In the case of an aircraft attacking a larger target like a factory, the high-angle attacks of the Stuka would not be needed, but a shallower angle, sometimes known as "glide bombing" would be enough. Glide bombing would increase the accuracy to the point that a single aircraft would have a reasonable chance of hitting a factory, instead of having a fleet of aircraft drop a huge number of bombs in hopes that some would hit the target. Udet and others in the Luftwaffe began to see the Bomber not as the strategic bomber that Wever argued for, but what was essentially a long-range Stuka.

The mock-up aircraft was completed in November 1937, and on 5 November 1937 it was allocated the official RLM airframe type number "8-177". That same day, the Oberkommando der Luftwaffe (OKL/Luftwaffe High Command) stipulated that the new design should possess sufficient structural strength to enable it to undertake medium-degree diving attacks. While viewing the aircraft at the Heinkel plant that day, Udet mentioned the new requirement to Heinkel. Heinkel replied that the aircraft would never be capable of it.

In spite of Heinkel's concerns, the design was modified for glide bombing, which required it to be strengthened to allow it to safely pull out of dives. Then the requirement was again modified, this time calling for a maximum dive angle of 60°, which necessitated further structural strengthening and a big increase in weight.

Problems arising from the latest requirement were never satisfactorily solved, due to the constant increases in loaded weight. Despite strengthened airframes, it was possible to overstress the airframe during dive-bombing. Although the German bomb-sights of the 1930s were inadequate, the later versions of the Lotfernrohr 7 proved to be comparable to the American Norden bombsight. With the introduction of the Lotfe 7, which offered an error of 20–30 metres (66–98 ft) from a release altitude of 3,000–4,000 metres (9,800–13,100 ft) and Hermann Göring's rescinding of the dive-attack requirement on 15 September 1942, the barred-gate type dive brakes on the wing's lower surfaces, placed just forward of each of the outboard ends of the Fowler flap panels, were omitted from all He 177A built after the initial A-0 pre-production batch. A photo of one of the 12 "destroyer" He 177A-1/U2, heavy-cannon-armed test airframes, showed the retracted dive brake panel still fitted on the undersurface of the outer starboard wing.

=== Undercarriage ===
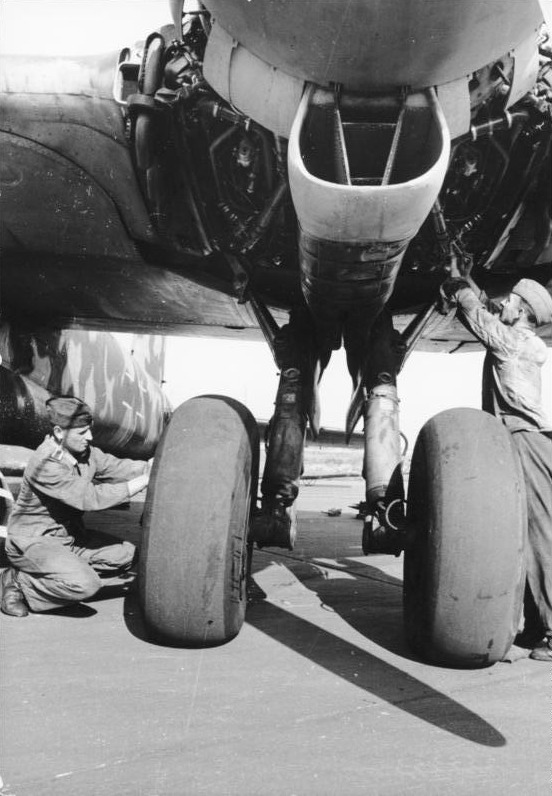
Closeup of the He 177A's portside twin-strut main landing gear, also showing details of the "welded-together engines'" tight engine installation from the ventral side of the cowling.

During development, the anticipated weight of the He 177 increased so much that a main undercarriage design sufficient to handle the 32 metric tons (35 short tons) loaded weight, was difficult to achieve. The engine nacelles and wings had little room for the main undercarriage members, which needed to be longer than usual, for ground clearance for the large diameter four-blade counter-rotating propellers. After several extremely complex arrangements had been considered during initial design, a novel system was adopted. Instead of a wheel leg under each engine nacelle, two-wheel legs were attached to the main spar at each nacelle, the outboard legs retracting upward and outward into shallow wing wells and the inboard legs swinging upward and inward into similar wells in the wing roots, with all units enclosed by flush fitting wheel and strut doors, which almost met under each engine nacelle when fully extended. During the retraction cycle, the forward-oriented lever-action lower gear strut sections (onto which the wheels were mounted on their axles), pivoted backwards to a 90° angle from 120° when fully extended. This was in order to position the wheels to fit into the wheel wells during the sideways folding action. A conventional rearwards-retracting single-leg twin wheel arrangement for each main gear, a design heavily influenced by the He 219's similar main gear components, was used on the two prototypes built (one during the war, one post-war) of the He 274 in France. Drawings were made for a tricycle gear arrangement for the four-BMW 801E radial-engine powered Amerikabomber entry version of the proposed He 277 by February 1943, which was also depicted with single main gear struts with twin wheels. For the He 177A's own landing gear maintenance needs, some two hours were required just to change a main gear tire, using special Heinkel-designed 12 metric tons (13 short tons) capacity main gear jacks and blocks.

== Prototypes ==
On 9 November 1939, the first prototype, the He 177 V1, was flown for the first time with Dipl. Ing. Leutnant Carl Francke, then chief of the Rechlin central flight test center, at the controls. The flight terminated abruptly after only 12 minutes due to overheating engines. Francke was pleased with the general handling and landing characteristics of the prototype but complained of some vibration in the airscrew shafts, the inadequacy of the tail surfaces under certain conditions, and some flutter which accompanied any vigorous movement of the elevators. The He 177 V2 made its first flight soon afterwards.

Following Francke's initial flight, the He 177 V1 received several modifications suggested by the initial trials, including a 20% increase in the tail surface area. These changes were not applied to the He 177 V2 when another test pilot undertook the first diving trials, during which the V2 developed severe control flutter and broke up in the air. Following this incident, the tail surfaces of the V3, V4, and V5 prototypes were modified in a similar fashion to those of the He 177 V1. The He 177 V3 was allocated the task of power plant development. The V1 through V3 prototype airframes were all equipped with two counterclockwise rotating DB 606 A powerplants, while the V4 prototype, and all later aircraft throughout the production run of the A-series, used a DB 606 A or DB 610 A engine on the starboard wing, and one clockwise rotating B-version of the same powerplant on the port wing, so that the propellers rotated "away" from each other at the tops of the propeller arcs. The He 177 V4 was retained at Heinkel's test field at Rostock-Schmarl (then known as Rostock-Marienehe) where it undertook diving trials. While flying over the Baltic, the He 177 V4 failed to recover from a moderate dive, crashing into the sea near Ribnitz. It was discovered that the accident had resulted from the malfunctioning of an airscrew pitch control mechanism.

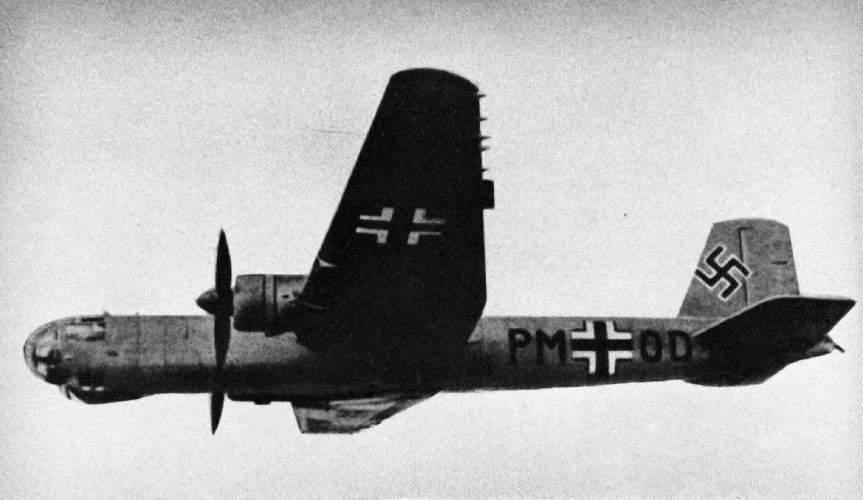
The fifth prototype He 177, the V5, with Stammkennzeichen code "PM+OD" and early cockpit design used on the first eight prototypes.

On 17 November 1938, before the construction of the He 177 V3 and V4 prototype airframes had even been started, Ernst Heinkel had personally asked the RLM to set aside the V3 and V4 airframes for a trial installation of four separate Junkers Jumo 211 powerplants to overcome the concerns that the RLM Technisches-Amt technical department's director Ernst Udet and Heinkel had expressed about the RLM's dive-bombing priority for the He 177A, but was turned down for the trial fitment.

The He 177 V5 incorporated a number of changes which were principally concerned with defensive armament installations. Early in 1941, during a simulated low-level attack, both DB 606 engines burst into flames, and the V5 hit the ground and exploded. The He 177 V6 was the first aircraft equipped with main production type DB 606 A/B engines instead of the pre-production units, which offered a slight increase in take-off power by 100 PS to 2700 PS (2,663 hp, 1,986 kW). The He 177 V7 featured a revised nose section which, while generally following the contours of the nose sections employed by the previous prototypes, was considerably reinforced and embodied fewer glazed panels. In September 1941, the He 177 V8, the last of the prototypes which had a different, "bullet-like" cockpit shaping and construction from the production He 177A series aircraft, was made available for engine tests. However, owing to the urgency of other development work it was returned to Heinkel after only 40 days, and it was not possible to resume engine tests in the air until February 1942. The He 177 V1 to V8 and the A-0 pre-production models are notable for having a broad-bladed set of four-bladed propellers, with blade shapes and profiles similar to those used on the Junkers Ju 88. These were not used on the production He 177A series aircraft.

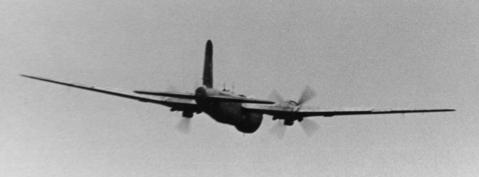
An He 177's outline in flight, heading away from the camera.

Photographs of the first eight prototypes show a largely circular fuselage cross-section, especially forward of the wing root, with the A-0 series possessing flatter sides, dorsal and ventral surfaces of the main A-series production aircraft. The choice of what was called the "Cabin 3" cockpit design on 20 September 1939 for the production A-series run, placed a well-framed hemispherical "fishbowl" nose onto the He 177A-0, giving it the generic "stepless cockpit", without the separate windshield for the pilot and co-pilot, that beginning with Heinkel's own He 111 P almost all German bomber aircraft had in World War II, and indeed had on all eight of the prototypes with the earlier "bullet" nose design. The forward glazing of the He 177A's "stepless" cockpit had each set of its characteristic framing members, of four supporting frame members per set running in each orthogonal direction, running as the parallels and meridians on a globe would. Two sets of four almost square windows, themselves arranged in a square of four windows each on each side of the upper cockpit, just behind the "fishbowl's" rear edge, provided sideways vision from the cockpit for the pilot and crew. Photographic evidence shows these side windows were produced with slight differences in external appearance between those built by Heinkel (with its primary headquarters, Heinkel-Nord plant near Rostock, and the satellite Heinkel-Süd plants around Vienna) and those built by Arado Flugzeugwerke (nearby to the Heinkel-Nord plant, with Arado based in Warnemünde), the only major subcontractor for the He 177A's airframes. Often, the two lower rows of the "fishbowls" windows in the nose glazing were made opaque, with the exception of the bombardier's protruding bombsight window offset to starboard in the lower nose glazing, either by painting them over or replacing them with metal panels that performed the same function.

== Production ==
Eight prototypes were completed, followed by 35 pre-production He 177A-0s (built by Arado and Heinkel) and 130 Arado-built He 177A-1s. The early aircraft in this batch were used for further trials, and after a brief and unhappy operational debut the remainder were withdrawn from service. From late 1942 they were replaced by He 177A-3s. Starting in August 1943, all He 177's delivered had an extended rear fuselage - by 1.60 m (5 ft 3 in) - to both instill greater stability for bombing accuracy (see Airworthiness and handling section) and to offset the slightly lengthened engine nacelles (a "stretch" by 20 cm (7.9 in)) and the associated centre of gravity change. Most of the short-fuselage A-3s were rebuilt to the longer standard by Eger Flugzeugwerke GmbH.

Production of the He 177 until 30 November 1944
Version	EHF	HWO	ArB	Total	Production period
Prototypes	8			8	
He 177A-0	15	15	5	35	
He 177A-1			130	130	January 1942 – January 1943
He 177A-3 (short fuselage)		88	159	247	November 1942 – July 1943
He 177A-3 (long fuselage)		217	148	365	August 1943 – June 1944
He 177A-5		71	279	350	December 1943 – August 1944
Total	23	391	721	1,135	

Note - One A-0, one A-3, and two A-5 rebuilt as He 177B prototypes from before December 1943 to July 1944.

== Engine difficulties ==
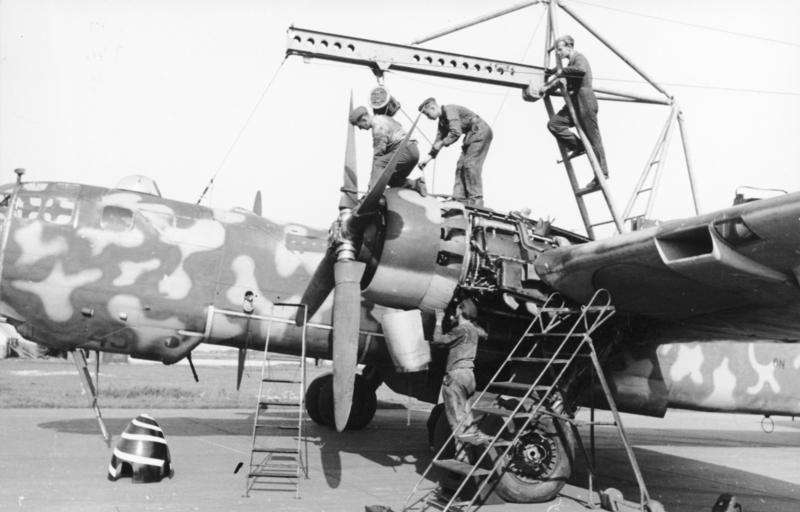
An He 177 undergoing engine maintenance or overhaul - note the second cylinder's exposed exhaust stub being even with the leading edge, an indication of the rearwards location of the "power systems".

The tendency of the twin-crankcase, 1.5 metric tons (1.7 short tons)-apiece DB 606 "power system" engines to catch fire became increasingly serious as the test programme progressed, and many of the He 177A-0 series of pre-production prototypes were destroyed in accidents or engine related incidents. The DB 606 engine had first been introduced on the Heinkel He 119 and later used on other aircraft such as the Messerschmitt Me 261 where they functioned as intended, but the extremely tight cowlings on the He 177A led to considerable problems, the most common being in-flight engine fires and engine overheating. There were several reasons for the flammability of the DB 606 engine as installed in the Greif engine nacelles. One was the common "central" exhaust manifold, serving a total of 12 cylinders, on the two inner cylinder banks of the twinned DB 601 component engines making up a DB 606. This central exhaust system routinely became excessively hot, causing the usual accumulation of oil and grease in the bottom of the engine cowling to catch fire. When the pilot throttled back there was a tendency for the mechanical fuel injection pump on each component DB 601 engine to "lag" in its response, delivering more fuel than was required by the engine. In addition, the fuel injection pump connections often leaked. To reduce the aircraft's weight, no firewall had been provided, and the aft end of each DB 606 was fitted so close to the main spar — with the rear two-thirds of the component powerplants' engine blocks being placed behind the wing's leading edge — that there was insufficient space for the fuel/oil fluid lines and electrical harnesses. The engines' exterior surfaces within the cowlings were frequently saturated with fuel and oil from leaking connections. At high altitude the oil tended to foam due to a badly designed oil pump, reducing its lubricating qualities. Insufficient lubrication caused disintegration of the connecting rod bearings, which sometimes resulted in conrods bursting through either one of the component engine crankcases and puncturing oil tanks. The oil would then spill on to the often-overheated central exhaust pipe collector. The tightly packed nature of the "power system" engine installations on the He 177A, with the extreme rearwards location of the component engines in their nacelles, also led to poor maintenance access as well as very poor ventilation. As a result of these factors, in addition to a lack of routine maintenance in the field, the DB 606 powerplants frequently caught fire in flight. The mechanical coupling of two engines proved to be difficult to perfect and led to numerous engine complications with the service test He 177A-0 and initial production A-1 models.

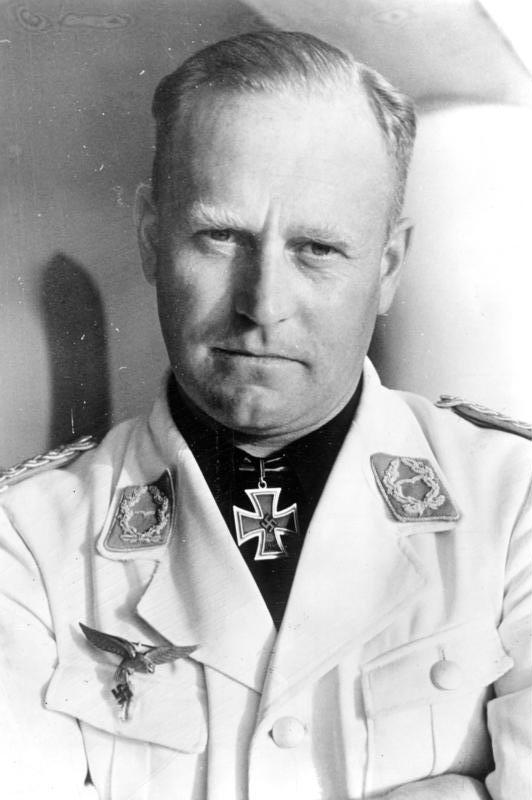
Oberst Edgar Petersen, the head of the Luftwaffe's Erprobungsstellen network of test facilities.

By early August 1942 Göring became angry about the apparent slowness with which the He 177A's powerplant problems were being dealt with. He received a report by Oberst Edgar Petersen (Kommandeur der Erprobungstellen; "commander of test facilities") about the He 177A's powerplant troubles, particularly containing remarks about the problems caused by the compromised design of the DB 606 powerplants' accommodation in the He 177A's engine nacelles, and resultant poor maintenance access. On August 13, Göring responded:

"Why has this silly engine suddenly turned up, which is so idiotically welded together? They told me then, there would be two engines connected behind each other, and suddenly there appears this misbegotten monster of welded-together engines one cannot get at!"

Starting with the He 177A-3/R2, the engines and nacelles were redesigned to eliminate the tendency for engine fires. The new "power system" was the Daimler-Benz DB 610, which consisted of two Daimler-Benz DB 605s coupled into a single unit like the DB 606. With the introduction of the DB 610 came several improvements, including the relocation of the engine oil tank, a changed oil flow pipe, an improved oil cooler, the lengthening of the engine mountings by 20 cm (8 in), the complete redesign of the exhaust system, which also facilitated the installation of exhaust flame dampers for night missions, and the setting of a power limitation on the engines which resulted in greater reliability. These major and minor modifications, supposedly numbering 56, were successful in eliminating engine fires, but other minor problems remained, involving the transfer gearbox fitted across the front ends of the "twinned"-component engines of each "power system" and their shared propeller.

Oberst Petersen, as well as a Major Mons (also a Gruppenkommandeur with II./KG 40, Petersen's former bomber wing), through the Erprobungsstellen personnel and establishments, were responsible for backing the substantial numbers of upgrades to the He 177A from the time of the cancellation of its dive-bombing requirement in September 1942.

== Experimental weapon loads ==
In addition to carrying a variety of bombs, torpedoes, and guided weapons, the He 177 was tested with a number of unorthodox offensive armaments. The first of the experimental weapons fitments known to have been tested was the 12 examples of the He 177A-1/U2 Zerstörer variant, which was armed with a pair of limited-traverse 30 mm MK 101 cannons in the extreme front of a dramatically enlarged Bola ventral gondola (beyond the hemispherical "fishbowl" nose glazing), and intended for ground attack, train busting, and possibly long-range anti-ship raids. These aircraft were also intended to be used against Allied long-range reconnaissance and bomber aircraft operating over the Atlantic Ocean, which were posing a danger to the Kriegsmarine's U-boat fleet. Later, when assigned to flak-suppression sorties in the area of Stalingrad during the winter of 1942, Luftwaffe forward maintenance units modified a small number of He 177A-3s, fitting a 50 mm Bordkanone BK 5 cannon with a 21-round magazine within the aircraft's undernose Bola gondola, with the long barrel protruding well forward, beyond the glazed "fishbowl" nose. This variant was unofficially dubbed the Stalingradtyp. Although a small number of He 177A-3/R5 models were to be built from scratch, with the larger PaK 40-based, autoloading 75 mm Bordkanone BK 7,5 autocannon in the Bola location fitted with its 12-round magazine, structural problems caused by the 75 mm weapon's recoil meant that the Stalingradtyp did not see combat use outside of the original, BK 5 armed handful.

Five He 177A-5s were experimentally equipped in January 1944 with batteries of 33 obliquely mounted 21 cm (8¼ in) calibre rocket mortar tubes, physically similar to the BR 21 single units already in use with single and twin-engined Luftwaffe fighters for bomber destroyer missions, and also likely to have been similarly derived from components of the Nebelwerfer infantry barrage rocket system. The nearly three dozen launch tubes placed in a Greif's fuselage in such a manner were meant to create the Grosszerstörer ("Big Destroyer") flying battleship, designed to break up and destroy the tight combat box defensive formations used by USAAF daylight bombers over Germany. The bomb bays and fuselage-housed auxiliary fuel tanks were removed on these aircraft in order to provide space for the spin-stabilized 21 cm (8¼ in) rockets and their launch tubes. The tubes were inclined to fire upward at an angle of 60° to the horizontal, and slightly to starboard. The tubes could be fired individually, simultaneously, or in two salvoes of 15 and 18. Tests with fixed balloon targets showed the potential of this system, and limited operational trials against US Eighth Air Force bomber streams were authorized. The aircraft were operated by Erprobungskommando 25, flying out of the Baltic coastal Erprobungstelle facility at Tarnewitz. The intended mode of operation required the Grosszerstörer He 177s to follow the enemy bomber formations, passing below (as with a Schräge Musik cannon fitment) and to port of the target, maintaining a difference of altitude of 2,000 m (6,560 ft) beneath the targets at the time of the attack. A few trial daylight operations were flown but no contact was made with Allied bomber formations, and as the escort fighters were becoming ever more numerous - in the manner of air superiority-purpose "fighter sweeps" well ahead of the massed USAAF bomber formations, starting in early 1944 as ordered by then Maj. Gen Jimmy Doolittle - the entire scheme was abandoned.

=== Defensive ordnance experiments ===
Experimental defensive weapon fitments were also fitted to a small number of He 177As set aside for such trials, mostly at the Erprobungstellen test detachment fields. One He 177A-1, s/n 15155 and bearing the Stammkennzeichen GI+BP, was fitted with the first-ever example of a remote-controlled twin-gun "chin turret" at the front of its Bola undernose gondola. The type of guns fitted was not recorded, but the date on which GI+BP was written off following a mishap in May 1943 would place the fitting of its experimental "chin turret" simultaneously with the lead-up to the May 1943 service introduction of the "gunship" USAAF Flying Fortress, the YB-40 (first flight September 1942), which pioneered the same type of forward defensive armament on the best-known American heavy bomber to attack Germany. Similarly, the much-anticipated Hecklafette HL 131V "quadmount" manned tail turret, fitted with a quartet of 13mm MG 131 machine guns, was tried in the late spring and summer of 1943 on a trio of A-3 examples set aside as the V32 through V34 prototypes, but that innovation never made it to production status, never existing as more than a series of engineering department mockups with Heinkel and Junkers, among others (for their aircraft designs that were intended to mount them) and working prototypes. The HL 131V turret's design originated with the Borsig division of Rheinmetall-Borsig (the manufacturer of the guns themselves) and was a design with promise, using hydraulic drive to both elevate the turret's side-mount gunmount elevation units through a +/- 60º vertical arc either side of level, with a capability for horizontal traverse (of the entire turret) of some 100º to either side, all at a maximum traverse angular speed of 60º per second. One development proposed during 1943 was to create a chin turret using the earlier Hecklafette's quadmount gun elevation assemblies to either side of a new, remote-control traverse core as the Bugstandlafette BL 131V, located at the forward end of the He 177A's Bola undernose gondola. However, engineering studies of the quadmount chin turret project revealed that its fitment, proposed for a number of the later He 177A variants and the He 177 V104 prototype airframe, would lower airspeed by about 30 km/h (19 mph) and reduce the deployable bombload by a full tonne, making the BL 131V concept unacceptable, and prompting the idea of using a chin-turret mount version of the FDL 151Z twin-cannon remote turret instead for the B-series, four-DB 603 engined He 177Bs, close to what had been pioneered with the GI+BP airframe early in 1943. Even with its unsuitability for the He 177A, the BL 131V quadmount nose turret was prototyped for armament tests at the Erprobungsstelle Tarnewitz for potential fitment and use on the He 177B V104 prototype airframe; and had, by mid-July 1944, completed its tests.

== Airworthiness and handling ==
A 3-view of the short-fuselage A-1, which was upgraded with a 1.60 m (5 ft 3 in) addition to its rear fuselage just aft of the wing root to become the A-3 - note dive brakes outboard of the nacelles, omitted for the A-3 onwards.

Flight testing of the He 177 in late summer 1942 revealed deficient stability around the yaw and pitch axes, resulting in extremely poor bombing accuracy when using the Lotfe 7 bombsight. The main reason for this was the drifting motion of the aircraft in flight due to its relatively short, round fuselage. Shortly after these tests, the third production A-1 example (factory serial number 15153, with Stammkennzeichen of GI + BN) had its fuselage lengthened by 160 cm (63 in) just aft of the trailing edge of the wing. The modified aircraft, with the longer distance of the "tail moment", showed a marked degree of improvement in yaw and pitch axis stability, enough to mandate the construction of the He 177A-3 and all subsequent models of the He 177A with the lengthened fuselage.

In early September 1944, the Royal Aircraft Establishment (RAE) was ordered to supply an aircrew for an He 177 that the French Maquis would capture at an airfield in Blagnac near Toulouse, where elements of both the He 177A-equipped KG 4 and KG 100 bomber wings were based. A transport and two escort fighters from the RAE flew to the area to leave the Royal Aircraft Establishment Chief Test Pilot Roland Falk and a flight engineer with the commando group. On 10 September, as Operation Dragoon was wrapping up in the southeast of France, the aircraft was captured and flown back to the UK by Falk. Soon afterwards, Capt. Eric Brown, an RN pilot then posted to the RAE as a test pilot, flew the He 177. He wrote that the in-flight handling characteristics of the He 177A-5 were "...positive about all axes, but the controls were all remarkably light for such a large aircraft. Indeed I had the feeling that the elevator was dangerously light and I was all too aware of the intelligence reports of He 177s breaking up in the air so I decided to treat this control very gently...The aircraft had an automatic pull-out device and an acceleration warning apparatus fitted, but it really was nailbiting to have to treat a giant like this immense Heinkel bomber as if it were made of glass. The stalling characteristics with flaps and undercarriage lowered, the aircraft buffeted violently at 140 km/h (87 mph) before the nose dropped at 135 km/h (84 mph). The buffet experienced was so violent that I had some concerns over structural damage. Somehow the He 177 always conveyed an impression of fragility despite its size." He added that it was "one of the very few German aircraft of the period that I tested that I did not enjoy flying".

== Further development: the Heinkel He 177B ==
Due to the continuing problems with the DB 606's configuration and engine accommodation design, much development work was done in order to rectify engine complications. This included a complete redesign of the original He 177, primarily through newer wing designs and layouts to improve the engine installation design, in conjunction with the A-3 subtype's lengthened rear fuselage, intended to create a four-engined version of the Greif's airframe. The first concerns over the coupled-engine vs. four separate engine issue for the He 177 emerged in mid-November 1938, as Ernst Heinkel had requested that two of the under-construction airframes for the eight He 177 prototypes to be fitted out with four individual engines in place of the coupled-engine arrangements, eventually specifying that the V3 and V4 airframes get four individual Junkers Jumo 211 engines in an in-plant corporate meeting on 17 November – exactly the same type and number of engines used on the Messerschmitt AG Amerikabomber contender, the Me 264 V1 in late December 1942. Ernst Udet was also critical before the war of the coupled DB 606 powerplant choice for the He 177, with Göring voicing his own frustrations with the seemingly interminable engine problems delaying the introduction of the He 177A into service. Göring was reported as stating in late August 1942, following his earlier complaints to Oberst Petersen on the 13th of the month: "I had told Udet from the start that I wanted this beast with four engines. This crate must have had four engines at some time! Nobody had told me anything about this hocus-pocus with welded-together engines!"

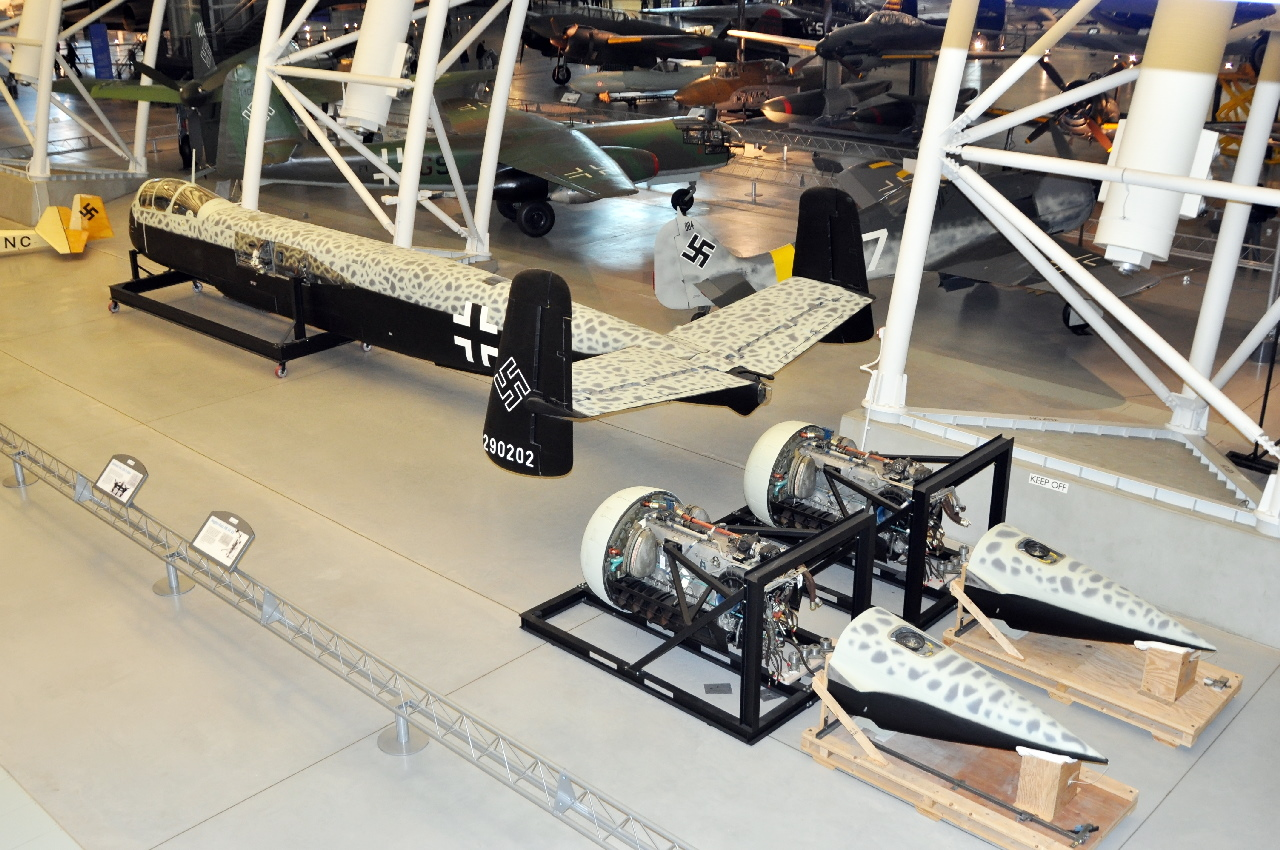
The NASM's partly restored He 219A-2 with its unitized DB 603 engines and fuselage.

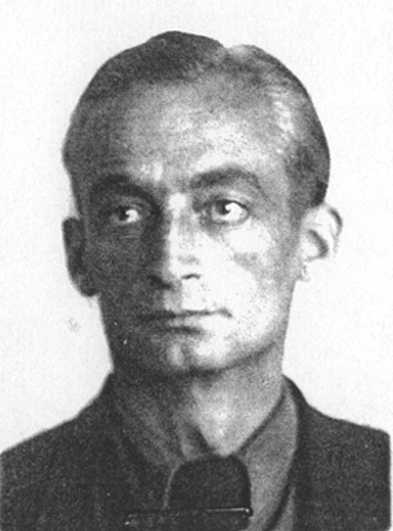
Luftwaffe Lt.Col. Siegfried Knemeyer, who flew the He 177 V102 in February 1944.

Nearly four years after Heinkel had unsuccessfully requested that the V3 & V4 be built with four individual powerplants, the RLM's requirement that the He 177 perform diving attacks was finally rescinded by Göring himself in September 1942, and with that, Heinkel's design work on the A-8 and A-10, collectively renamed the He 177B in August 1943, was then able to progress. They were meant to be powered with four individual Daimler-Benz DB 603 engines on new longer-span wings, with each liquid-cooled DB 603 fitted with a Heinkel He 219-style annular radiator right behind the propeller—most likely comprising a Heinkel-specific unitized engine installation that had already been perfected during the He 219's development—for each of the quartet of DB 603s fitted, the same style of radiator that was used on the standard He 177.

By August 1943 much of the detail work for the He 177B series aircraft was well on its way to completion, and Erhard Milch eagerly approved the creation of three He 177B prototypes, designated He 177 V101 to V103. He stated on 10 August: "The He 177A-4 and A-5 will be produced as before. The He 177B-5 will be tackled with vigor. It will be built in series as soon as possible."

The He 177B-5's first-built prototype, the He 177 V101, was converted from a mid-production He 177A-3 airframe (number 535 550, with Stammkennzeichen of NN + QQ), the V102 being converted from the eighth He 177A-0 production prototype aircraft (which required the He 177A-3 specification aft fuselage lengthening), and the V103 being converted from an existing, early production He 177A-5 airframe, with all three airframes initially retaining the production 177A-style single vertical tail surfaces. Although no photographs are known to exist verifying their fitment, the general arrangement Typenblatt drawing for the V101 airframe—bearing the "B-5" subtype designation within the drawing's title block—showed that it was intended to be uniquely fitted with a small-area matching vertical pair of so-called pivoting "drag rudders" mounted, one per side, a short distance in from the horizontal stabilizers' tips, directly inline with the inner engine nacelles, to simulate "engine-out" conditions. Each of the pivoted "drag rudders" were to have their area divided equally above and below the plane of the stabilizer. Because flight testing had revealed that the single-tailed V101 exhibited an increasingly serious stability problem with higher airspeeds, the subsequent prototype, the V102, was both the first He 177B example to fly, on 20 December 1943, with the quartet of DB 603 engines, in combination with a brand-new empennage of twin tail configuration, fitted to it during the early autumn of 1943. When the V102 was tested later that autumn while still flying with its A-series wing and powerplants before its own pair of B-series "four-engine" wing units were ready, the new twin vertical tails gave the V102 significantly better in-flight handling compared to the original 177A-style empennage of the V101, except during the landing approach when the Fowler flaps were extended during its own initial flights with the twin tails in November 1943. On 24 February 1944, as the USAAF's Big Week strategic bombing campaign against Germany continued, particularly against targets in northern France involving V-weapons installations—a meeting was held at the all turf-surfaced Wiener Neustadt military airfield. Erhard Milch, and fellow guests Oberst Edgar Petersen and Oberstleutnant Siegfried Knemeyer (Göring's top aviation technology expert), each had a chance to fly the now four-engined V102 prototype after the B-series set of wings had been fitted. Knemeyer stated that he could not believe a four-engined heavy bomber could possess the "excellent handling qualities" that the V102 displayed. The only verifiable wartime photograph of any of these He 177B prototypes in an intact condition is one of the V101, parked outdoors on a foggy German airfield, most likely the Heinkel-Sud factory airfield at Schwechat. One additional surviving photo, showing what looks like a He 177B-series prototype from the right side with a production-style A-series single vertical tail surface set, and bearing the Stammkennzeichen code of NE+OD, does not match any item of the surviving documentation for the four known 177B-series prototypes ordered, built or flown before the end of the war, and possessing one of the upgraded, upright-seating A-5 subtype's tail gunner's emplacements, as well as the usual twin dorsal turret defensive armament of the He 177A-5 subtype.

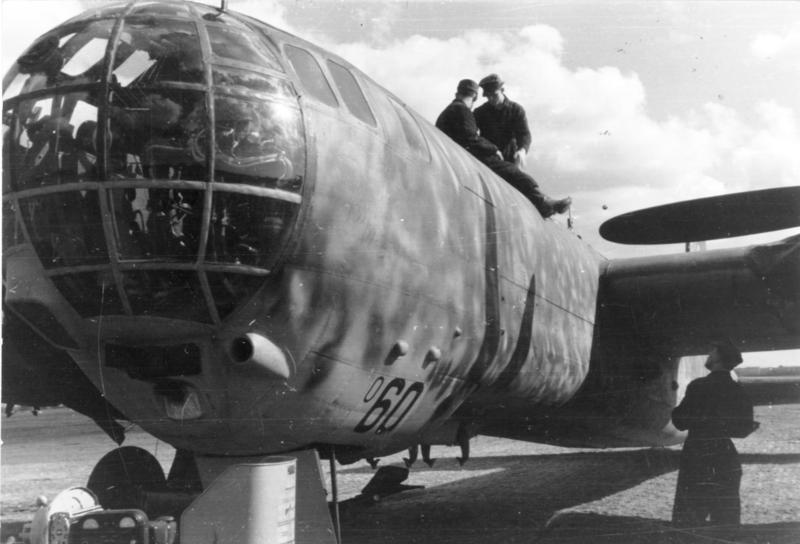
Closeup of the "fishbowl" nose glazing and Bola undernose gondola of an A-series Greif - the B-series prototypes (V101-V104) used them as well.

The He 177B was also intended to introduce a slightly enlarged, somewhat more aerodynamic fully glazed nose. It somewhat echoed the lines of the nose glazing from the Airspeed Horsa British troop glider in a side view comparison, and was first meant for use on the production A-7 version. It could incorporate a remotely controlled power chin turret at the front of its Bola for forward ventral defense, mounting either a pair of 13mm MG 131 machine guns or 20mm MG 151 cannon and closely modeled on the A-series 177's existing FDL 131Z forward dorsal turret, but the new nose design was only tested on the He 177 V15 production prototype (converted from an A-3, factory serial 355 001), without the chin turret. It was never fitted on any of the He 177B prototypes, which all used the standard "Cabin 3" He 177A's well-framed nose. No photographs of this new nose design are known to have survived the war and only drawings of it exist in modern archives, with the V15 airframe itself wrecked in a crash on 24 June 1944. The remaining defensive armament for the B-series design generally remained similar to the He 177A, particularly the twin dorsal gun turrets for the He 177B-5, with the aft manned dorsal turret being deleted on the planned He 177B-7 (as on the He 177A-7) to reduce weight, and a fully powered, manned Hecklafette HL 131V tail turret, carrying a quartet of MG 131 machine guns, was intended for installation on the prototypes. The Hecklafette HL 131V four-gun manned tail turret system would have been standardized on the production B-series aircraft, but never went beyond the mockup and working prototype stage, with a trio of the prototype tail turret units documented as being fitted to the He 177 V32 through V34 A-series DB 610-powered prototype airframes for trials. The cumbersome four-strut main landing gear of the A-series was retained for the B-series prototypes, even though the height, meant to allow clearance for the A-series' pair of large four-blade propellers, was not changed – the outer edge of the DB 603's inner engine nacelle/wing surface juncture was located right at the "centreline" of each of the twin pairs of A-series main gear strut locations, on all four of the B-series prototypes.

The first flights of the He 177B prototypes, starting with the He 177 V102 on 20 December 1943, occurred between late December 1943 and early January 1944 in the vicinity of the Vienna-Schwechat airfield, at the firm's Heinkel-Süd production facility. An additional prototype, the V104, whose purpose was to be the "finalized" pre-production prototype for the He 177B-5, and also meant to be a twin-tailed prototype like the earlier V102, was being completed thereby order from the RLM, converted from an early production He 177A-5. However, from 23 April, through July 1944, repeated Fifteenth Air Force bombing raids on German aircraft production facilities in Vienna, and on 8 July destroyed the airworthy V103 and the incomplete V104 at the Zwölfaxing factory airfield of the Heinkel-Süd complex, setting back plans to produce any series examples of the B-5 version. Arado Flugzeugwerke, which had been the major subcontractor for the A-series Greif airframes, was fully involved at that time with the production of its own, much more advanced Arado Ar 234 B turbojet-powered reconnaissance-bomber, and was not able to handle the anticipated demand from Heinkel to produce the B-5 by October 1944. Arado would not have been able to start the He 177 B-5's production for another month (November 1944) due to its own focus on the Ar 234 B. The last known official account of the whereabouts of the two He 177B prototypes that escaped the bombing raids placed the V101 at the Heinkel-Süd plant's airfield at Schwechat near Vienna, and the V102 also at Schwechat as late as February 1945. It had sustained damage from a bad landing in April 1944 while evading one of the initial USAAF 15th Air Force raids on the area, which had kept it from being flown north to the Luftwaffe's Rechlin test facility for safety.

The adoption of the Emergency Fighter Program in early July 1944 dealt the final blow to the entire He 177B development program, with the Heinkel He 162 Spatz jet fighter being the only new Heinkel aircraft design allowed into production.

== Operational history ==
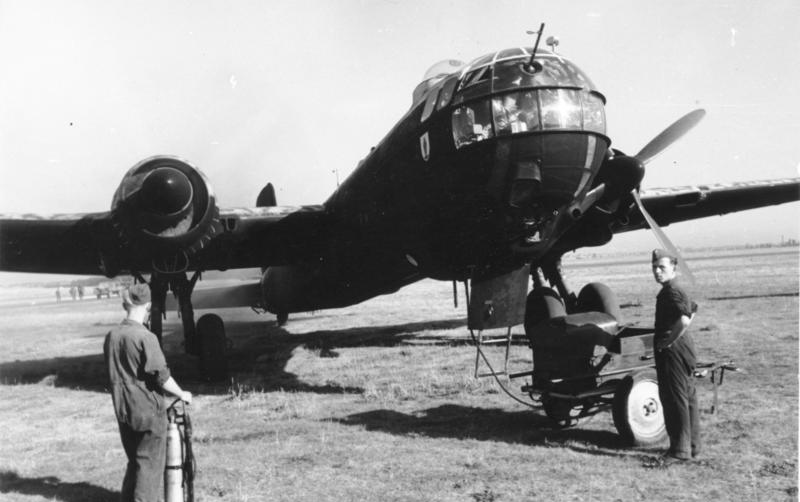
A He 177 during refueling and engine-run up 1943. Note the four-bladed propeller. The aircraft is painted in a night camouflage scheme.

Beset by technical difficulties in development, the He 177 had a troubled history in service. Unduly demanding design requirements of long-range, high speed, heavy bomb load, and the formerly required dive bombing capability compounded the problems. Although the He 177 entered service in 1942, it was far from operational. In an assessment of the aircraft on 9 April 1942, the newly activated Erprobungsstaffel 177 reported that the Greif had good flying characteristics, but had unacceptable engine troubles and problems with its airframe strength. As an emergency measure, aircraft from Kampfgeschwader 50 were used to supply the encircled 6th Armee at Stalingrad, where they were found to be unsuited for the transport role, carrying little more cargo than the smaller and more reliable Heinkel He 111, and proving useless for the evacuation of wounded. As a result, the He 177s reverted to bombing and flak-suppression missions near Stalingrad. Only thirteen missions were flown, and seven He 177s were lost to fire without any action attributable to the enemy.

As the war progressed, He 177 operations became increasingly ineffective. Fuel and personnel shortages presented difficulties, and He 177s were sitting on airfields all over Europe awaiting new engines or engine-related modifications. Of the 14 He 177A-3s (the primary subtype in use) that were sent out during Operation Steinbock, one suffered a burst tyre, and eight returned with overheating or burning engines. Of the four that reached London, one was lost to night fighters. These aircraft were brand new, delivered a week before the operation and not fully flown in, because the air unit had moved to a new airfield the day before and lacked sufficient maintenance personnel and material. Constant attacks against Luftwaffe long-range combat units in France made continuous operations difficult.

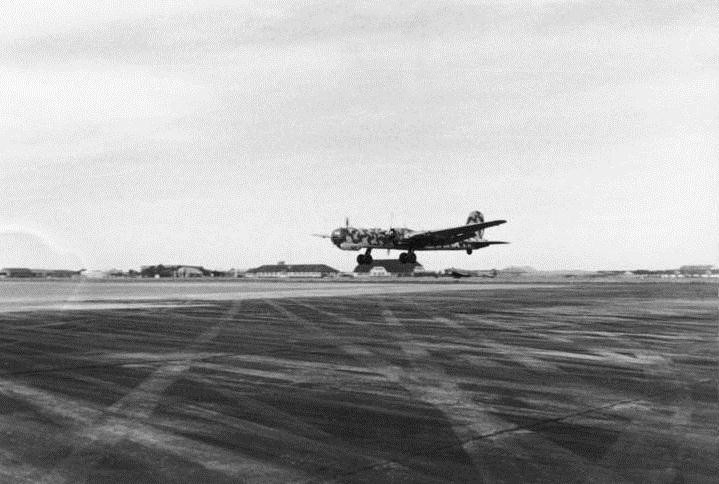
A He 177 taking off for a sortie, 1944.

While Steinbock was unsuccessful, the He 177 did achieve some successes. During Steinbock, crews typically carried two 1,800 kg (3,970 lb) and two 1,000 kg (2,200 lb) bombs. Climbing to 7,000 m (22,965 ft) while still over German territory, the He 177s approached the target in a shallow dive, both engines throttled back, the pilot putting his aircraft into a gliding descent to take it across the bomb release-point at about 4,500 m (14,760 ft). After releasing the bombs the pilot re-opened the throttles, but continued the descent at approximately 200 m (656 ft) per minute. The bombers typically re-entered German airspace at an altitude of 750 m (2,460 ft), and headed back to base. By such means, the He 177s were able to keep up speeds of about 600 to 700 km/h (370 to 430 mph) during their withdrawal phase. The higher speed and constant change of altitude made interceptions difficult, increasing the survivability of the aircraft, but decreased bombing accuracy and concentration. With an average loss rate of 60% for bomber aircraft types used in Operation Steinbock, the He 177's loss rate below 10% made it the most survivable bomber in the campaign.

In February 1944, at around the same time as Operation Steinbock, He 177s and Dornier Do 217s carrying Henschel Hs 293 glide bombs attacked Allied shipping off the Anzio beachhead.

On the Eastern Front, the most notable action by the He 177 was a mass raid of some 87 aircraft against railway targets in the Velikiye Luki area, about 450 km (280 mi) west of Moscow on 19 July 1944. The participating Staffeln flew in three large attack wedges of about thirty aircraft, each loaded with four 250 kg (551 lb) or two 500 kg (1,102 lb) bombs. During this action, carried out in daylight at altitudes in excess of 6,000 m (19,690 ft), losses were relatively light. The Soviet Air Force, equipped mainly for low-level interception and ground-attack roles, could do little to hinder the high-flying bombers.

In common with most piston-engined German bombers, the He 177 was grounded from the summer of 1944 due to the implementation of the Emergency Fighter Program (Jägernotprogrammas) as well as the Allied bombing of German fuel production facilities.

== Variants ==
He 177 V1 to V8
First eight prototypes of the He 177. V1 through V3 powered by DB 606 A engines. He 177 V4 and subsequent aircraft powered by DB 606 A/B engines.
He 177A-0
Pre-production series, 35 built. First to use the "Cabin 3" cockpit with "fishbowl" framed glazed nose, as with production A-series.
He 177A-1
First production series, 130 built. Armed with a single MG 81 in the nose, a single MG FF/M cannon in the forward end of the Bola ventral gondola, a remote-controlled dorsal turret with a single (later twinned) MG 131, and a single tail mounted MG 131.

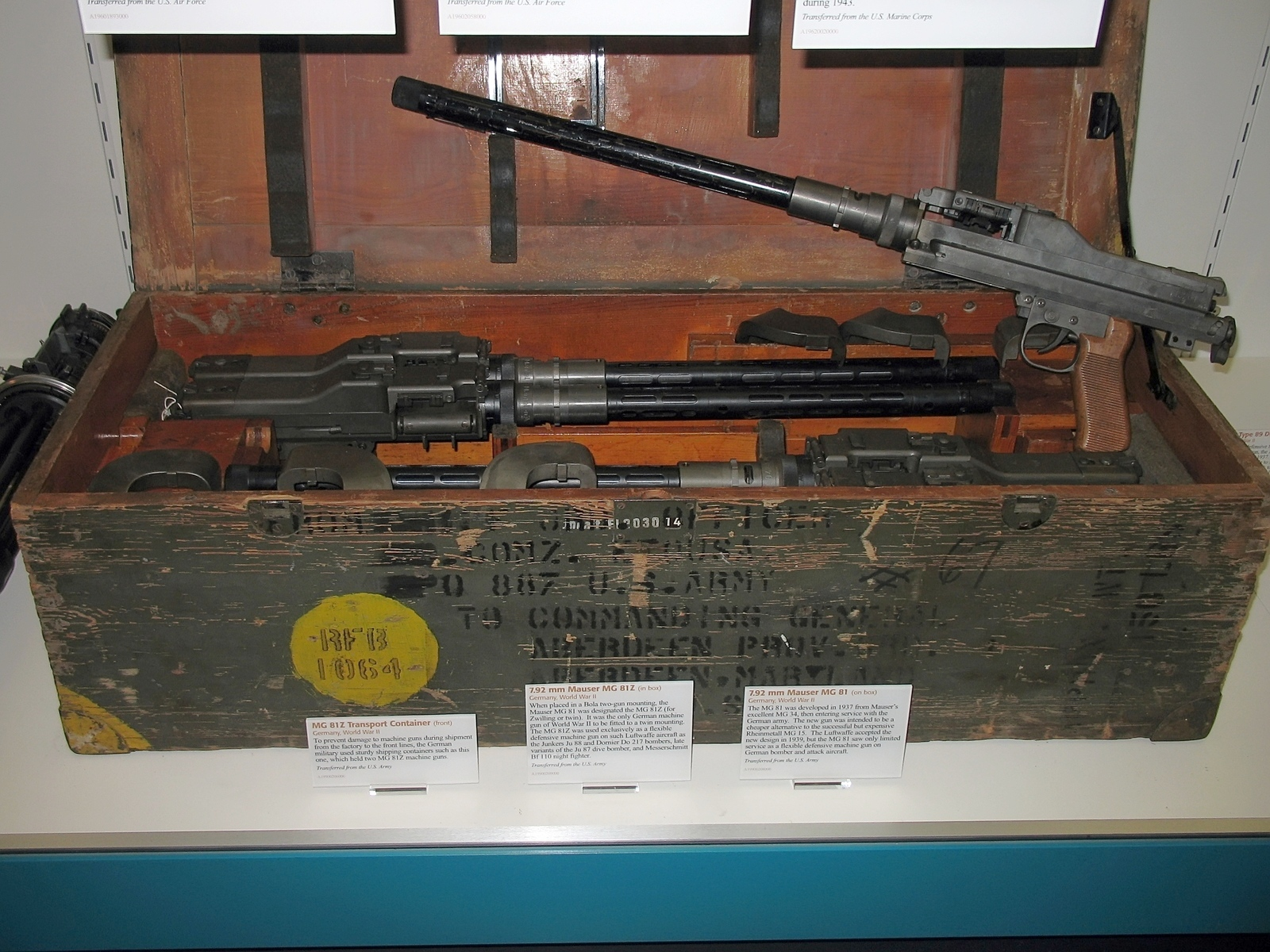
An MG 81Z "twinned" machine gun pair, used for the /Rüstsatz 1 He 177A-1 field modification, in a shipment case.

He 177A-1/R1

Equipped with a pair of aft firing MG 81Z machine guns in the rear of the Bola ventral gondola.

He 177A-1/R2

Experimental version only, equipped with a sighting station in the rear of the Bola ventral gondola for a remotely controlled ventral turret housing a single MG 131.

He 177A-1/R4

Equipped with a supplementary aft firing MG 131 in the rear of the Bola ventral gondola and a manned aft dorsal turret containing an MG 131.

He 177A-1/U2

Zerstörer heavy fighter with a pair of limited-traverse 30 mm MK 101 cannon in enlarged Bola lower nose mount, 12 conversions.
He 177A-2
Proposed four-man pressurized variant with reduced defensive armament of six MG 81 and a single MG 131, never built.
He 177A-3
Second production series, 170 built, with a fuselage lengthened by 1.60 m (5 ft 3 in). Sixteenth and subsequent aircraft powered by DB 610 A/B engines.

He 177A-3/R1

Powered by two Daimler-Benz DB 606 A/B engines, 15 built.

He 177A-3/R2

Improved electrical system. MG FF cannon replaced by an MG 151 cannon in the Bola ventral gondola. DB 610 engines. Larger, upright seating-equipped redesigned tail position, MG 131 replaced by MG 151 cannon in the tail position. First variant to be fitted with Kutonase (cable cutting equipment).

He 177A-3/R3

Anti-shipping version capable of using the Henschel Hs 293, equipped with FuG 203-series Kehl I control gear, usually fitted in the rear fuselage.

He 177A-3/R4

Bola Ventral gondola's aft end lengthened by 1.2 m (3 ft 11 in) to provide room for the FuG 203b Kehl III missile-control equipment, instead of the usual rear-fuselage mounting location.

He 177A-3/R5

Planned, never-built Stalingradtyp version armed with a 75 mm Bordkanone BK 7,5 cannon based on the 7.5 cm PaK 40 installed in the ventral Bola gondola, based on a small number of He 177 As field-equipped with the KwK 39-based BK 5 cannon.

He 177A-3/R7

Torpedo bomber version abandoned in favor of the He 177A-5, only three built.
He 177A-4
Proposed high altitude pressurised version, never built under the designation, and later developed into the Heinkel He 274.
He 177A-5
Main production series, 826 built. Standardized on the A-3's longer rear fuselage, strengthened wing, shortened undercarriage oleo legs, ETC 2000/XII wing racks and an increase in maximum external load.

He 177A-5/R1

Version optimized for Fritz X and Hs 293 guided bombs, equipped with Kehl control gear.

He 177A-5/R2

Armed with a single MG 81 in the nose, a single MG 151 cannon in the forward end of the Bola ventral gondola, an MG 131 in the rear end of the ventral gondola, a pair of MG 131 in an FDL 131Z remotely controlled forward dorsal turret, a single MG 131 in a manned aft dorsal turret, and a single tail-mounted MG 151 cannon.

He 177A-5/R4

Simplified bomb rack installation, equipped with Kehl control gear.

He 177A-5/R5

Tested with a supplementary pair of MG 131 in an FDL 131Z aft ventral remote turret aft of the rear bomb-bay, only one built.

He 177A-5/R6

Replacement of the forward and central bomb-bays with enlarged, full-fuselage-depth fuel tanks.

He 177A-5/R7

Pressurised cockpit study with a projected ceiling of 15,200 m (49,869 ft) and similar reduced armament to the He 177A-2.

He 177A-5/R8

Armed with FDL-series remote gun turrets. Abandoned as a result of difficulties with the turrets, only one built.

He 177A-5 Grosszerstörer

Anti-bomber variant based on the He 177 A-5, armed with up to 33 spin-stabilized 21 cm (8¼ in) calibre rockets obliquely mounted in fuselage, replacing bomb bays and auxiliary fuel tanks, and most likely based on components of the 21 cm Nebelwerfer 42 infantry barrage rocket system. Five examples delivered in January 1944 for operational trials. Abandoned due to increasing numbers of Allied air supremacy fighters.
He 177A-6
Meant to be a "32 metric-ton" loaded-weight long-range bomber, as a planned improvement over the A-5 version, the A-6 dispensed with the rear manned dorsal turret, and retained the A-5/R2's single MG 151 flexible cannon at the front of the Bola, the flexible ball-mount MG 81 in the "fishbowl" nose glazing, along with the regular A-series FDL 131Z remote forward dorsal turret, and standardized the rear armament with the planned, Borsig-designed Hecklafette manned HL 131V quadmount MG 131 machine gun turret for the first time. Not produced, due to building volume of design work on the He 177B-series four-engined aircraft.

He 177A-6/R1

Replacement of the forward and central bomb bays with full-fuselage-depth fuel tanks (as on the A-5/R6 modification) and the addition of external bomb rack under the new fuel tank bays, capable of carrying a single 2,500 kg (5,511 lb) bomb or Fritz X/Hs 293 in addition to the rear bomb-bay payload of four 250 kg (551 lb) or two 500 kg (1,102 lb) bombs, if equipped with Kehl control gear. Range of 5,800 km (3,604 mi), only six test conversions built, from A-5 versions.

He 177A-6/R2

Equipped with a redesigned fuselage nose of improved aerodynamic form, abandoning the earlier "Cabin 3" cockpit, with the new nose being generally the same as intended for He 177A-7 and all He 177B development versions. Retained the FDL 131 remotely controlled forward dorsal turret, a single flexible-mount MG 131 in the rear of the Bola, a pair of MG 151/20 cannon in a remotely controlled FDL 151Z "chin" turret (to be standardized on the B-version) at the front of the Bola, and a manned Hecklafette HL 131V hydraulic-drive, quadruple-MG 131 armed "quadmount" tail turret. Similar bombload and range to He 177A-6/R1. Only one test airframe converted from an He 177A-3 to test the new cockpit/nose, as the He 177 V15, of which no photos are known to survive, and which itself was wrecked in a mishap in late July 1944.

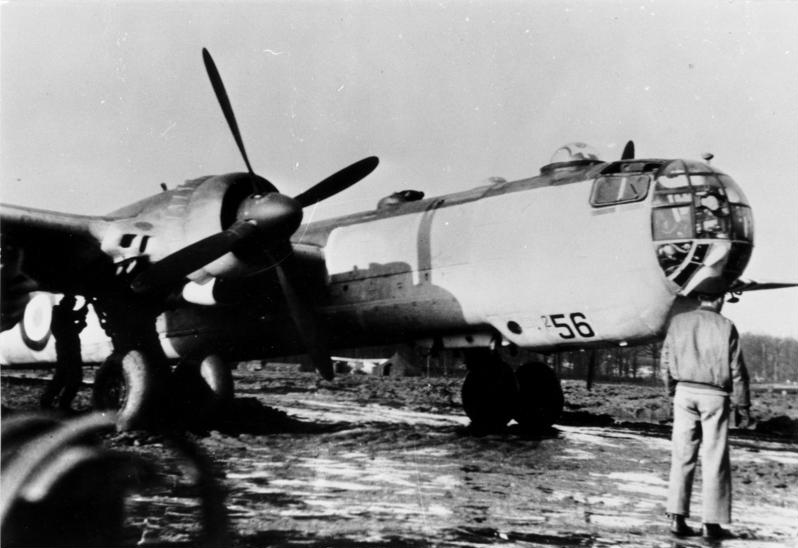
Wk. Nr. 550 256, He 177A-7 prototype post-war.

He 177A-7
High-altitude bomber with an extended wing spanning 36 m (118 ft 1⅓ in) and powered solely with DB 610 A/B engines instead of the intended 3,800 PS (3,748 hp, 2,795 kW) DB 613 "power systems", which never emerged from testing and used pairs of twinned DB 603 engines for each "power system". Six examples, for wing tests, converted from He 177A-5 airframes, but never fitted with the intended He 177B-series advanced cockpit. One converted He 177A-5 example, Wk. Nr. 550 256 captured by American forces, scrapped postwar and believed buried under the grounds of Chicago's O'Hare International Airport.
He 177A-8
First proposed He 177 design to feature four individual engines, using the A-3 or A-5 fuselage with a new wing design, and either Daimler-Benz DB 603 engines as prototyped (He 177 V101 through -V103 in 1943-44) or Junkers Jumo 213 engines (proposal only) with He 219 style annular radiators for the Heinkel-unitized DB 603s used in the He 219. Remained a paper project only, before re-designation as the "He 177B-5" by August 1943.
He 177A-10
Proposed four-engined He 177 design, similar to the He 177A-8, but based instead on the He 177A-7 definitive production fuselage, with manned rear dorsal gun turret omitted, and re-designated as the "He 177B-7" in August 1943.

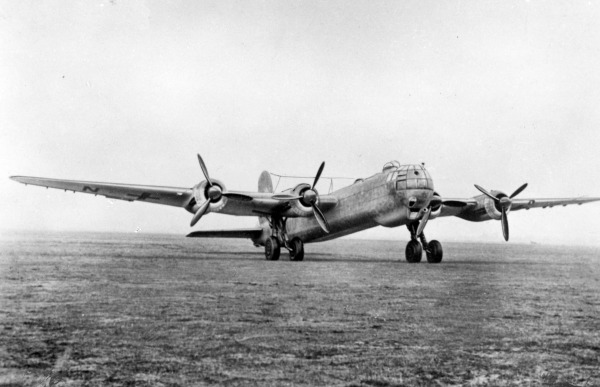
Wk. Nr. 535 550, He 177B-0 prototype.

He 177B
Developed as the direct, "separate four-engined" development of the "coupled engine" powered He 177A-series, four prototypes ordered (He 177 V101 to V104) with three built and flown under DB 603 power. Originally postulated in postwar aviation books to have been a "cover designation" for the never-produced, paper-only He 277 Amerikabomber design competitor by February 1943, itself cancelled in late April 1944.
He 177H
Initial project designation for the Heinkel He 274.
He 179
Proposed 1939 variant of He 177 with four separate piston engines; not built.

Special variants
He 177 V38

An A-5 (Werknummer 550 002, bearing Stammkennzeichen of KM+TB) – documented use was as testbed for FuG 200 Hohentwiel ASV maritime patrol radar with flexible MG 131Z nose gun installation, speculated to have been intended for the installation of an enlarged bomb bay for test purposes, said to be intended for use in the Junkers Ju 287. A common myth claims V38 was the prototype for a German "atomic bomber" (purportedly capable of carrying a fission device as a droppable weapon). Remains found at Prague's Ruzyne field on V-E Day.

== Operators ==
Germany

- Luftwaffe
  - Fernkampfgeschwader 50
  - Kampfgeschwader 1
  - Kampfgeschwader 4
  - Kampfgeschwader 10
  - Kampfgeschwader 40
  - Kampfgeschwader 100
  - Kampfgeschwader 200
  - Flugzeugführerschule (B) 15
  - Flugzeugführerschule (B) 16
  - Flugzeugführerschule (B) 31
  - Wekusta/OBdL

France

- French Air Force operated at least two He 177 A-3s left behind by the Germans and rebuilt by SNCASE at Blagnac.

United Kingdom

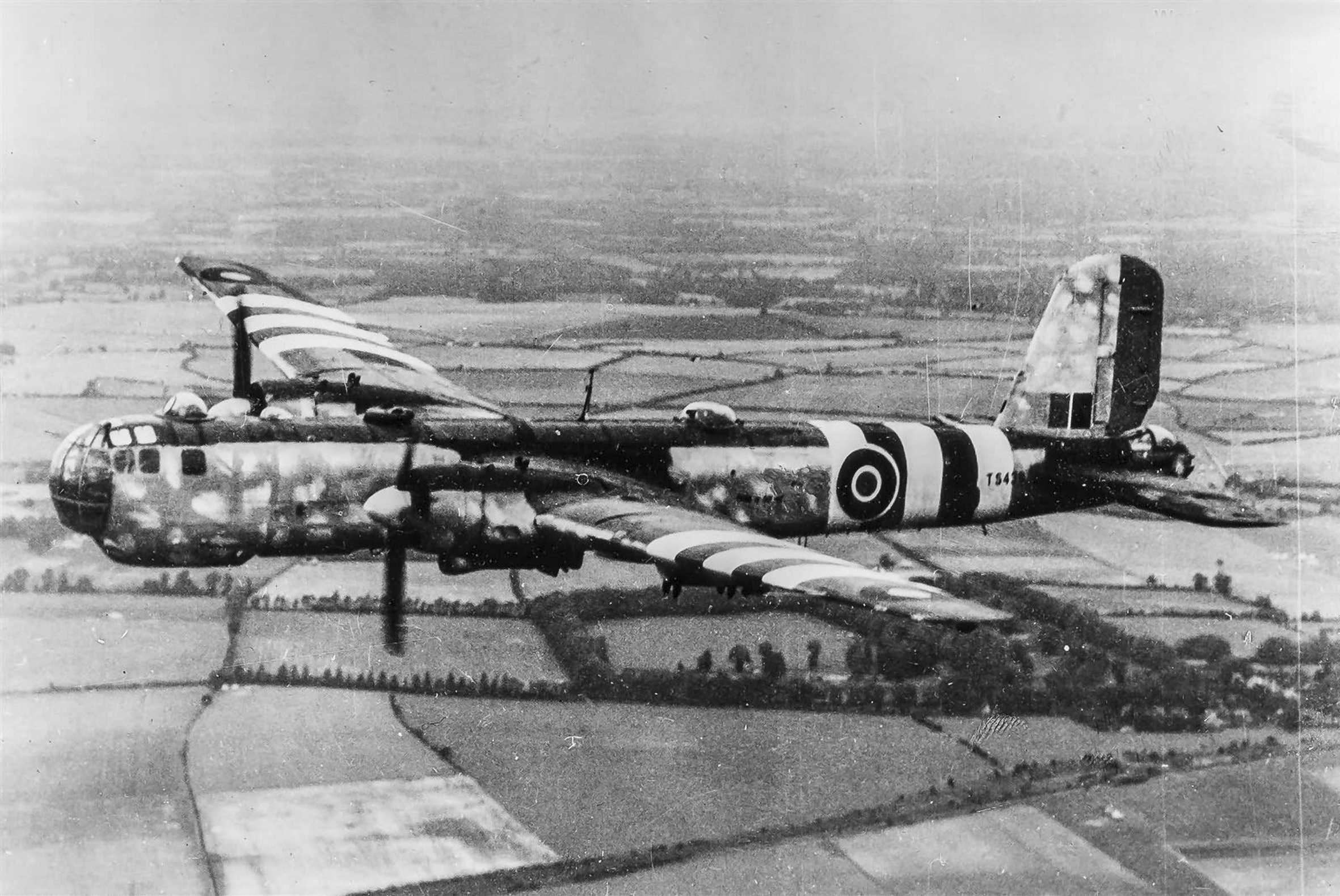
He 177 A-5 with British roundels.

- Royal Aircraft Establishment

The He 177 A-5 (Geschwaderkennung code of F8 + AP from 6./KG 40) that had been taken from Toulouse-Blagnac airfield in September 1944 was repainted with British markings and given the serial TS439. Used purely for evaluation purposes.

== Surviving aircraft ==
All surviving He 177 A aircraft, including the photographed He 177 B wreck at Eger Flugzeugwerke GmbH and both He 274 airframes completed in France post-war, are known to have been reduced to scrap by the end of the 1950s, so there are no surviving examples.

== Specifications (He 177 A-5/R2) ==
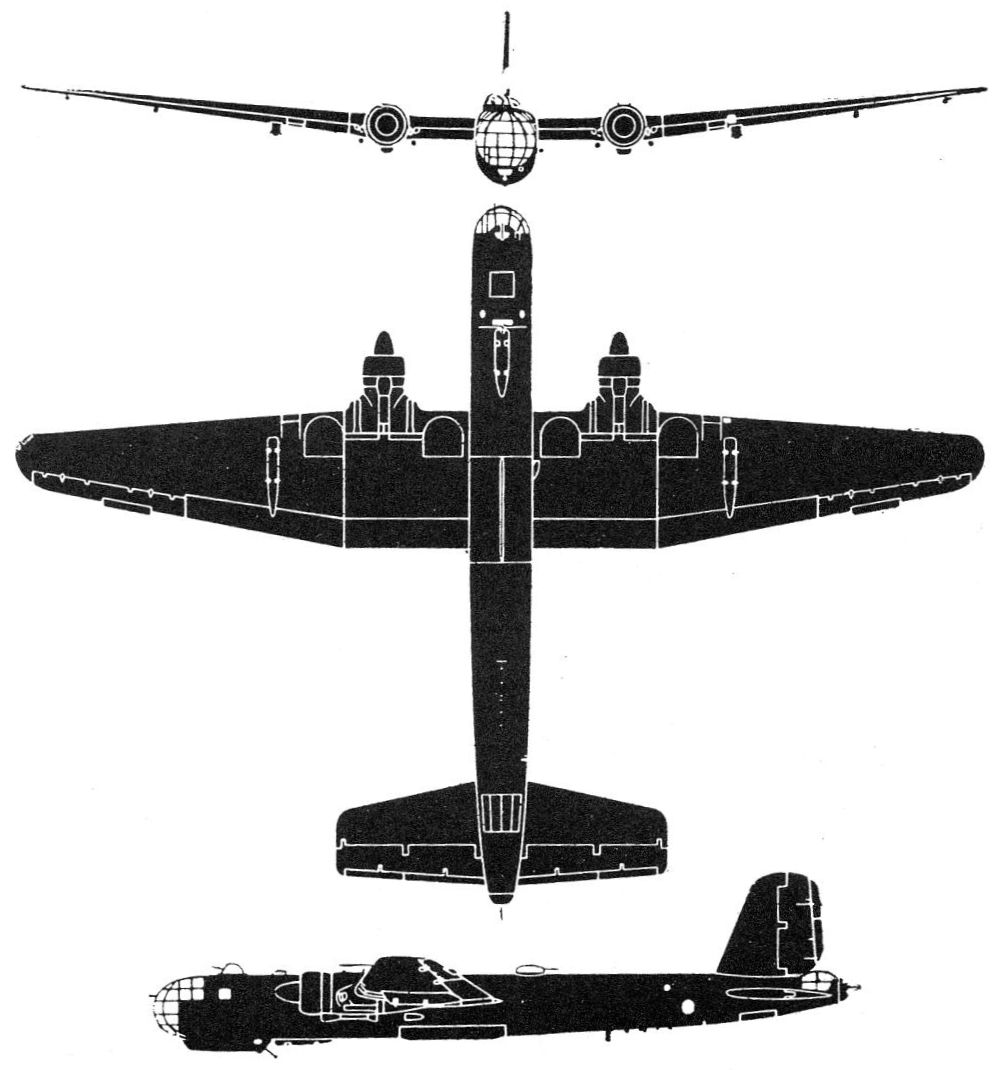
Heinkel He 177 3-view

Data from Heinkel He 177, 277, 274

General characteristics

- Crew: six
- Length: 22.00 m (72 ft 2 in)
- Wingspan: 31.44 m (103 ft 2 in)
- Height: 6.67 m (21 ft 11 in)
- Wing area: 100 m^{2} (1,100 sq ft)
- Airfoil: He 1.5 36.8 17.3-0.715-36.6
- Empty weight: 16,800 kg (37,038 lb)
- Gross weight: 32,000 kg (70,548 lb)
- Useful load: 15,200 kg (33,500 lb)
- Powerplant: 2 × Daimler-Benz DB 610 24-cylinder liquid-cooled piston engines, 2,218 kW (2,975 hp) each
- Propellers: 4-bladed VDM constant-speed propellers

Performance

- Maximum speed: 488 km/h (303 mph, 263 kn) at 6,000 m (20,000 ft) in level flight
- Cruise speed: 415 km/h (258 mph, 224 kn) at 6,000 m (20,000 ft)
- Stall speed: 135 km/h (84 mph, 73 kn)
- Range: 6,000 km (3,700 mi, 3,200 nmi)
- Service ceiling: 8,000 m (26,000 ft)
- Rate of climb: 3.2 m/s (630 ft/min)
- Wing loading: 310 kg/m^{2} (63 lb/sq ft)
- Power/mass: 5.25 kg/hp (11.6 lb/hp)

Armament

- Guns: ** One 7.92 mm (0.312 in) MG 81 machine gun in nose.
  - One 20 mm (0.8 in) MG 151 cannon in forward belly gondola, and one in tail.
  - Two 13 mm (0.5 in) MG 131 machine gun in FDL 131Z remotely operated forward dorsal turret, and one in rear belly gondola, one in manned HDL 131/1 aft dorsal turret
- Bombs: Up to 7,000 kilograms (15,000 lb) of ordnance internally, up to 2,500 kg (5,500 lb) externally on underwing racks.
  - 48 × 50 kg (110 lb) bombs or 12 × 250 kg (550 lb) bombs or 10 × 500 kg (1,100 lb) bombs
  - 6 × 500 kg (1,100 lb) bombs or 6 × 1,000 kg (2,200 lb) bombs or
  - 4 × 1,400 kg (3,100 lb) bombs or 4 × 1,700 kg (3,700 lb) bombs or 2 × 1,800 kg (4,000 lb) bombs or 2 × 2,500 kg (5,500 lb) bombs
  - 2 × 1,000 kg (2,200 lb) bombs and 2 × 1,800 kg (4,000 lb) bombs or 2 × 1,800 kg (4,000 lb) bombs and 2 × 1,700 kg (3,700 lb) bombs
  - 2 × 1,800 kg (4,000 lb) bombs and 2 × LMA III mines
  - 6 × LMA III mines [3,000 kg (6,600 lb)] or 4 × LMB III mines [4,000 kg (8,800 lb)]
  - 2 × LT 50 torpedoes under the wings
  - 2 × FX 1400 Fritz X or Henschel Hs 293 or Hs 294 under wings + 1 × FX 1400 Fritz X or Hs 293 or Hs 294 under fuselage
  - 2 × 500 kg (1,100 lb) bombs internally + 2 × Hs 293 under the wings

Avionics

- FuG 203 Kehl-Strasbourg MCLOS radio control transmitting system for Fritz X (gravity) and/or Henschel Hs 293 (rocket-boosted) ordnance.

== See also ==
- Bomber B, the shorter range solution for a German heavy bomber from 1939 onwards, to replace the Schnellbomber concept.

Related development

- Heinkel He 274
- Heinkel He 277 - never-completed development, became Heinkel's Amerikabomber design entry by February 1943

Aircraft of comparable role, configuration, and era

- Avro Manchester
- Boeing B-17 Flying Fortress
- Dornier Do 317
- Handley Page Halifax
- Nakajima G8N
- Petlyakov Pe-8

Related lists

- List of aircraft of World War II
- List of military aircraft of Germany
- List of bomber aircraft
