= Kampfgeschwader 40 =

- Heinkel He 177 bombers from the 40KG at the Bordeaux-Merignac airfield, 1944
- Active: 1939–45
- Country: Nazi Germany
- Branch: Luftwaffe
- Type: Bomber wing
- Role: Anti Shipping.
- Size: Air Force Wing
- Engagements: World War II; Battle of the Atlantic; Operation Steinbock

Insignia
- Identification symbol: Geschwaderkennung of F8

Kampfgeschwader 40 (KG 40) was a Luftwaffe medium and heavy bomber wing of World War II, and the primary maritime patrol unit of any size within the Luftwaffe. It is best remembered as the unit operating a majority of the four-engine Focke-Wulf Fw 200 Condor maritime patrol bombers. The unit suffered from the poor serviceability and low production rates of the Fw 200 bombers, and from repeated diversion of its long-haul capability aircraft to undertake transport duties in various theatres, especially for the airlift operations to supply encircled forces in the Battle of Stalingrad. Later in the war, KG 40 became one of several Luftwaffe bomber wings to use the Heinkel He 177A heavy bomber.

== Service history ==
The wing was formed in July 1940 at Bordeaux-Merignac under the control of Fliegerführer Atlantik. The unit flew reconnaissance missions in the North Atlantic searching for Allied convoys and reported their findings to the Kriegsmarine's U-boat fleets. On 26 October 1940 Oberleutnant Bernhard Jope bombed the 42,000 GRT liner Empress of Britain, the ship later being sunk by U-32. Between August 1940 and February 1941, the unit claimed over 343,000 long tons (349,000 t) of ships sunk. The newer Fw 200C-2 was then available and differed only in having the rear ventral areas of the outer engine nacelles recessed with dual-purpose bomb racks fitted to carry a pair per aircraft of the quarter-tonne SC 250 bombs, or standard Luftwaffe 300 L (66 imp gal; 79 US gal) drop tanks in the bomb bay for longer ranged patrols.

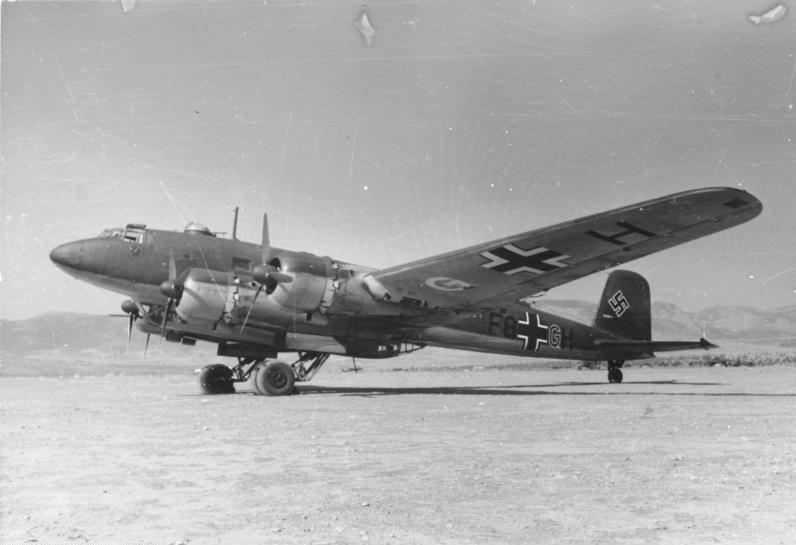
Focke-Wulf Fw 200 of KG 40

On 9 February 1941, five Focke-Wulf Fw 200 of I./KG 40 under command of Fritz Fliegel, in cooperation with the heavy cruiser Admiral Hipper and U-37, attacked the British convoy HG 53. The convoy lost 967-ton Norwegian freighter Tejo and British freighters Jura, Dagmar I, Varna, and 2,490 GRT Britannic to aerial attacks.

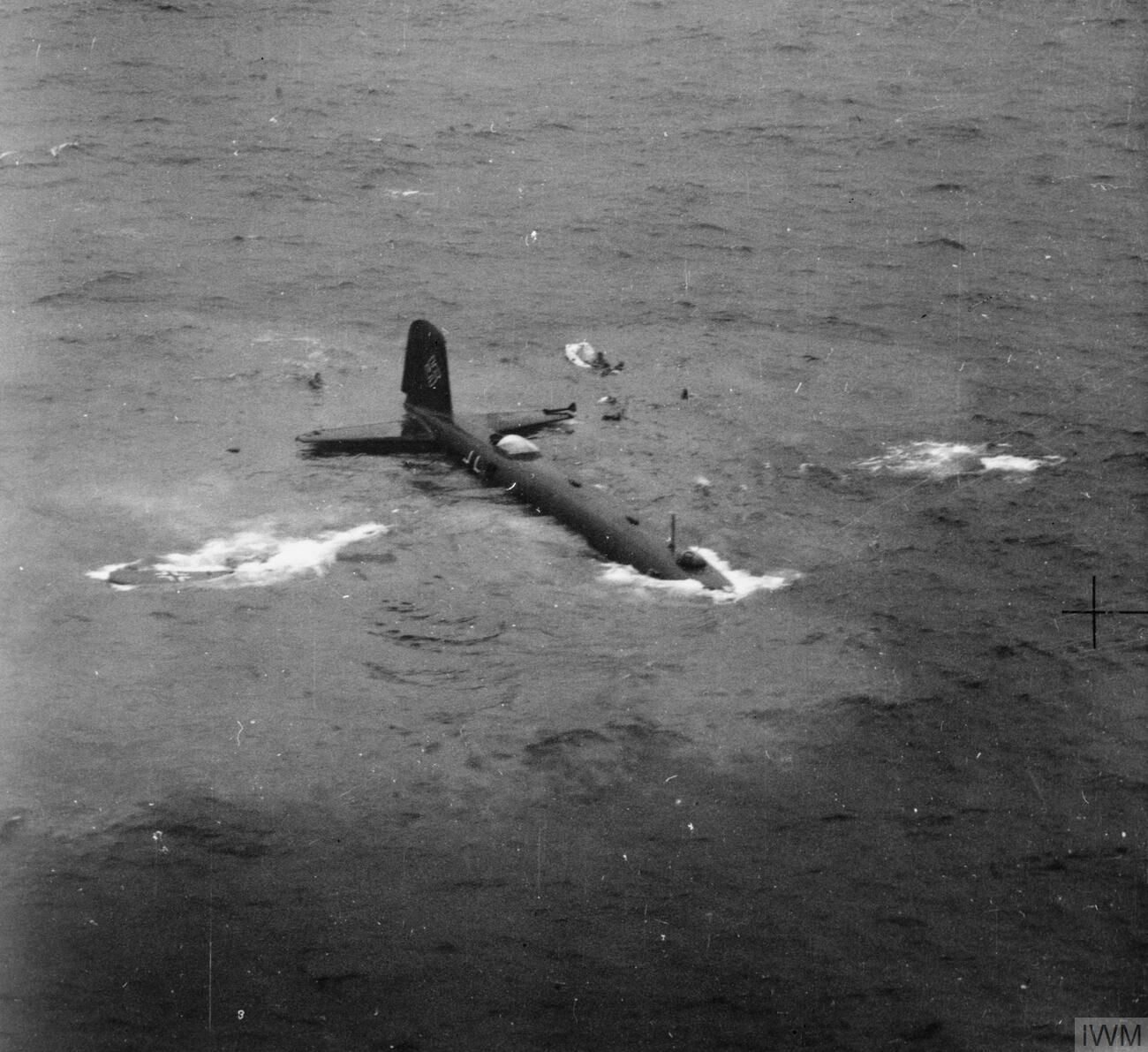
A Focke-Wulf Fw 200C of KG 40 sinking in the Atlantic Ocean west of Ireland, after being shot down by a Lockheed Hudson Mk V of No. 233 Squadron RAF 23 July 1941.

With the lack of suitable long-range aircover to counter KG 40 in mid 1941 the Allies converted several merchant ships to CAM ships ('catapult aircraft merchant' ship) as an emergency stop-gap until sufficient RN escort carriers became available. The CAM ship was equipped with a rocket-propelled catapult launching a single Hawker Hurricane, dubbed a "Hurricat" or "Catafighter". KG 40 crews were then instructed to stop attacking shipping and avoid combat in order to preserve numbers. Their objective was to locate and shadow convoys and continually report by radio their composition and course changes to allow the Kriegsmarine to direct wolf-packs onto a convoy.

On 18 July 1941 the Fw 200C with combat wing code (Geschwaderkennung) of F8+AB (and the crew of Hpt. Fliegel) were lost to AA fire while attacked by a CAM Ship Hurricane. On 3 August 1941 F8+CL of 3.Staffel was damaged in combat with another CAM Hurricane flown by Lt. R. Everett RNVR launched by HMS Maplin and crash-landed in France with two dead and one injured aboard. On 1 Nov 1942 the SS Empire Heath in convoy HG 91 launched her Sea Hurricane flown by F/O Norman Taylor DFM to chase the Focke-Wulf Fw 200C F8+DS of 7.Staffel. The aircraft flown by Oblt. Arno Gross was shot down, with no survivors.

By late 1943, the main role of the KG 40's Condors was to interdict Allied Gibraltar convoys, whose departure was usually reported by German agents in Spain. Aircraft would take off in fours, flying out to an initial point at sea level and in close formation, before fanning out to fly parallel tracks about 25 mi (40 km) apart, periodically climbing to 1,000 ft (300 m) and making a broad circuit while they searched for shipping using their FuG 200 Hohentwiel low-UHF-band ASV radar. When contact was made the aircraft would send details of the convoy make-up and its course, and if feasible, make bombing attacks from a minimum altitude of 9,000 ft (2,700 m).

After the Allied invasion in Normandy, KG 40 suffered many losses in attacks on the landing beaches; and in October 1944 KG 40 transferred to Germany, and was intended for conversion to the Messerschmitt Me 262 jet fighter. This never happened and the unit was disbanded on 2 February 1945.

== Focke Wulf Variants with KG 40 ==
Although the Fw 200 was the heaviest Luftwaffe bomber, the bomb load was only 2,000 pounds (910 kg). The plane was a converted airliner, and had not been designed to withstand damage. They were manned by the best graduates of the bomber training schools, and supervised by former Lufthansa pilots already expert at long-distance flying by dead reckoning navigation. The number of available aircraft was insufficient to effectively patrol approaches to the British Isles. Monthly production of four or five aircraft barely compensated for operational losses; and the number of serviceable Fw 200s could often be counted on the fingers of one hand. The opportunity for effective maritime patrol had passed before the purpose-designed He 177 became available.

The initial production reconnaissance version supplied to the unit was the Fw 200C-1, armed with one 20mm MG FF cannon in the nose, one 7.92mm MG 15 machine gun in the ventral gondola, as well as the rear and forward dorsal positions. Offensive armament included four 250 kg bombs on under-wing racks. Due to the Fw 200C's origins as an airliner and not generally being designed to handle the rough maneuvering at low altitudes that could occur in maritime patrol engagements against the Allies, the Fw 200C-1 was prone to enduring much more stress than its airliner-class airframe could handle: it could be prone to breaking its back on landings and at least eight Fw 200Cs were lost when the fuselage fractured just aft of the wing, with further examples of the Fw 200C also known to have had a wing panel dropping loose from the wing root after a hard landing.

The Fw 200C-3 introduced in 1941 featured a strengthened airframe, more powerful 1,000 hp Bramo 323R-2 radial engines, and various armament changes. Sub-variants included the Fw 200C-3/U1 with a 15mm MG 151 cannon in a power-operated forward turret of a similar type to that used on the upper nose of the Blohm und Voss Bv 138 flying boat, and forward Bola-mount MG FF cannon being replaced by an MG 151. The Fw 200C-3/U2 had the MG 151/15 or /20 deleted to allow the inclusion of a Lotfe 7D bomb sight, while the C-3/U3 carried an MG 131 in front and rear dorsal positions; and the C-3/U4 accommodated an extra gunner and two additional waist-mounted MG 131s.

The Fw 200C-4 equipped the unit from February 1942, and added the pre-production Rostock and then standard FuG 200 Hohentwiel search radar, giving blind-bombing capability. The Fw 200C-4 reverted to the HDL 151 turret and MG 15s, while the Bola gondola retained a MG 131 machine gun or MG 151/20 forward-firing cannon depending on if the Lotfe 7D bombsight was fitted.

== Sub-units ==
- 1./KG 40 were equipped with the Fw 200C-1 and initial missions were flown from Danish bases from 8 April 1940 against British ships. In late June the unit was transferred to Bordeaux-Merignac, which was to be the main base. By 9 February 1941 1./KG 40 had been joined by two further Staffeln, totalling a nominal 36 aircraft on strength. I/ KG 40 operated from Norway through the summer 1942 against Arctic convoys supplying the Soviet Union. In early January 1943 1. and 3./KG 40 moved to Stalino as KGrzbV 200 to transport supplies to the Stalingrad 'pocket'. Both staffeln would later be remustered as a new 8./KG 40. The new 1. and 3./KG 40 began forming in Fassberg with He 177A bombers.
- 4./KG 40 was formed 1 January 1941 with the He 111, while the remainder of II Gruppe was formed 1 May 1941 at Lüneburg with Dornier Do 217s. By March, 1941 II/ KG 40 was operating out of Holland.
- III./ KG 40 began operating out of Bordeaux with Heinkel He 111s, and later equipped with Fw 200s.
- V/KG 40, a heavy fighter unit (V/KG 40 flying the Junkers Ju 88C-6), was activated in 1942 to intercept the bombers of RAF Coastal Command- the Luftwaffe's only long range maritime fighter unit. The RAF deployed the Bristol Beaufighter and later, Mosquitos into the bay.

== Commanding officers ==
- Major Edgar Petersen, April 1941 – September 1941 (later with rank of Oberst, commander of all Erprobungstellen test facilities)
- Oberst Hanns Heise, November 1944 – February 1945

== Bibliography ==
- Goss, Chris (2025). KG 40: The Luftwaffe's Multi-Role Strike Wing 1940–1945. Hull, UK: Chandos Publications. ISBN 978-1-9993-1658-7.
