= Edgar Petersen =

WW2 Luftwaffe officer & pilot (1904-1986)

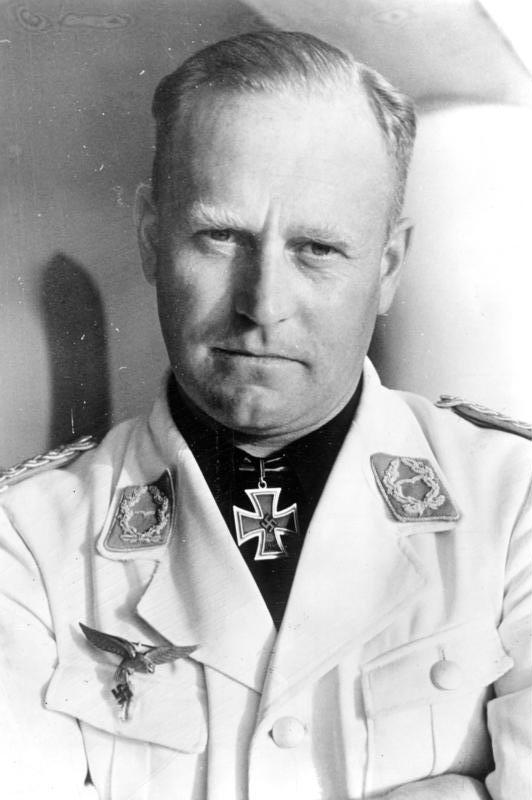
- Born: 26 April 1904; Straßburg, Elsaß, German Reich
- Died: 10 June 1986 (aged 82); Andechs, Munich
- Military career
- Allegiance: Nazi Germany
- Branch: Luftwaffe
- Rank: Oberst
- Commands: KG 40
- Conflicts: World War II
- Awards: Knight's Cross of the Iron Cross

Edgar Petersen (26 April 1904 – 10 June 1986) was a German bomber pilot and officer in the Luftwaffe during World War II.

== Biography ==
Petersen was instrumental, as Geschwaderkommodore of the Kampfgeschwader 40, in converting the Focke-Wulf Fw 200 into what Winston Churchill called the "Scourge of the Atlantic" during the Battle of the Atlantic. Petersen also served in the position of Kommandeur der Erprobungstellen (commander of all Luftwaffe test stations) as an Oberst later in the war, in which capacity from September 1942 onwards became centrally involved with the further development work required for the Luftwaffe's only operational heavy bomber, the Heinkel He 177 A, to make it combat ready, mostly focusing on the fire-prone DB 606 and DB 610 powerplants used for powering the He 177 A's airframe. In September 1942 Reichsmarschall Hermann Göring had rescinded the 1937-imposed mandate for the He 177 A to perform moderate-angle dive bombing missions. From the time of his appointment as the "KdE", at Rechlin, Oberst Petersen headed the development program to govern and manage the task of applying the substantial number of upgrades required for the troubled He 177 A to be successful in service.

== Awards ==
- Knight's Cross of the Iron Cross on 21 October 1940 as Major and Gruppenkommandeur of the I./Kampfgeschwader 40

Military offices
Preceded by Oberstleutnant Hans Geisse	Geschwaderkommodore of Kampfgeschwader 40; April 1941 – September 1941	Succeeded by Oberstleutnant Dr. Georg Pasewaldt
