= Dornier Do 217 =

1940 bomber aircraft family by Dornier

Do 217
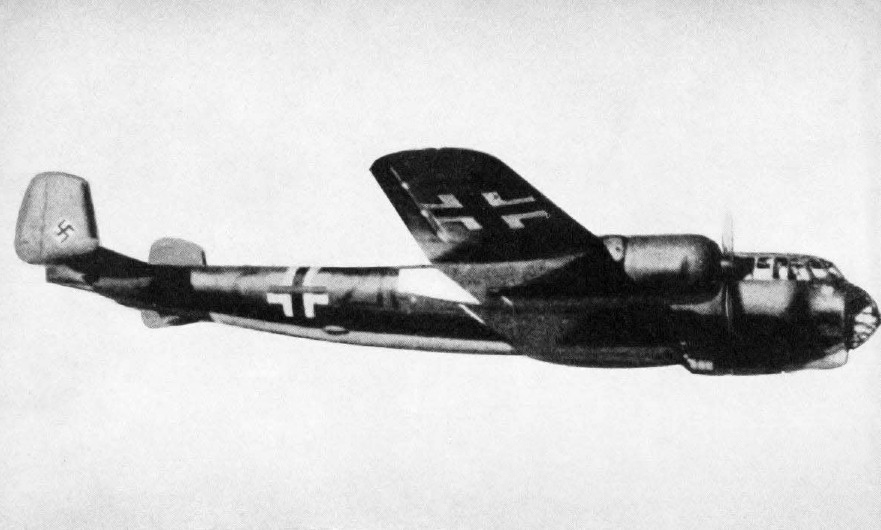
- Do 217 E-2

General information
- Type: Medium bomber Heavy bomber Night fighter Reconnaissance aircraft
- Manufacturer: Dornier Flugzeugwerke
- Primary user: Luftwaffe
- Number built: 1,925

History
- Manufactured: 1940–1943
- Introduction date: 1941
- First flight: 4 October 1938
- Retired: 1945
- Developed from: Dornier Do 17
- Developed into: Dornier Do 317

The Dornier Do 217 was a bomber used by the German Luftwaffe during World War II. It was a more powerful development of the Dornier Do 17, known as the Fliegender Bleistift (German: "flying pencil"). Designed in 1937–1938 as a heavy bomber but not meant to be capable of the longer-range missions envisioned for the larger Heinkel He 177, the Do 217 design was refined during 1939 and production began in late 1940. It entered service in early 1941 and by the beginning of 1942 was available in significant numbers.

The Dornier Do 217 had a much larger bomb load and a much greater range than the Do 17. In later variants, dive bombing and maritime strike capabilities using glide bombs were experimented with, considerable success being achieved. Early Do 217 variants were more powerful than the contemporary Heinkel He 111 and Junkers Ju 88, having a greater speed, range and bomb load. Owing to this it was called a heavy bomber rather than a medium bomber. The Do 217 served on all fronts in all roles. On the Eastern Front and Western Front it was used as a strategic bomber, torpedo bomber and reconnaissance aircraft. It was also used for tactical operations, either direct ground assault or anti-shipping strikes during the Battle of the Atlantic and Battle of Normandy. The Do 217 was also converted to become a night fighter and saw considerable action in the Defence of the Reich campaign until late in the war.

The type also served in anti-shipping units in the Mediterranean, attacking Allied convoys and naval units during the Battle of the Mediterranean. In 1943, the Do 217 was the first aircraft to deploy precision-guided munitions in combat, when Fritz X radio-guided bombs sank the Italian battleship Roma in the Mediterranean. After the end of the war, at least one Dornier Do 217 continued in military operational service with the Swiss Air Force until 1946.

== Development and design ==
=== Early designs and marine plans ===
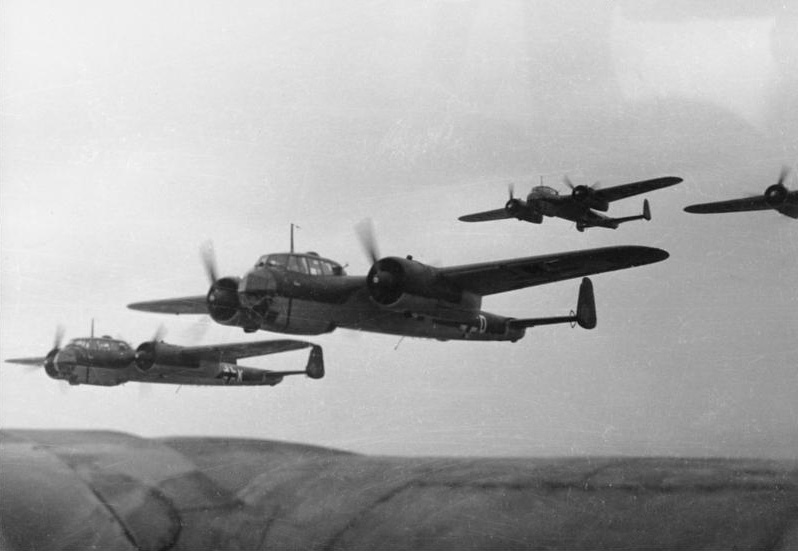
The Dornier Do 17. The Do 217 was to be a larger, improved version in all areas.

At the beginning of 1938, Dornier issued manufacturing specification No. 1323, recognising the need for a twin-engine bomber or long-range reconnaissance aircraft powered by Daimler-Benz DB 601B engines. In February 1938 the Reichsluftfahrtministerium (RLM/German Aviation Ministry) authorized a testing program. Dornier worked on a version of the Do 17M with the all round vision cockpit of the Do 17Z and a fuselage with a large bomb bay capable of holding a maximum of two 500 kilograms (1,100 lb) and ten 50 kilograms (110 lb) bombs. For reconnaissance an Rb 50/30 movie camera was fitted ahead of the front spar of the wing, and an Rb 20/30 was mounted in the second bomb bay. Jettisonable fuel tanks were carried in the forward bomb bay. For smoke-laying, the aircraft could be fitted with two Type S200 smoke generators. Dornier also envisaged the Do 217 as a naval dive bomber, in which case it was to be fitted with twin floats. In April and May 1938, the Do 217 WV1 and WV2 prototypes were produced.

The wing span was to be one metre greater than that of the Dornier Do 17, giving an overall span of 19 metres (62 ft 4 in). Under the wing a retractable diving air brake was to be installed. To power the aircraft the Dornier office at Manzell favoured two DB 601B engines, which could generate 1175 PS (1159 hp, 864 kW) for take off. The Jumo 211, Bramo 329 and BMW 139 (forerunner to the BMW 801) were also considered. Whichever power plant was selected, the RLM expected the aircraft to have a maximum speed of 520 kilometres per hour (280 kn) and weigh 10,200 kilograms (22,500 lb) fully loaded. On 5 June 1938 Dornier's overview of its design submitted to the Technical Bureau (Technisches Amt) highlighted some structural differences from the Do 17. In particular, the proposed increase in the bomb load to 1,500 kilograms (3,300 lb) had to have been a vital factor in the design's acceptance. The fuselage was to be not only bigger but also stronger.

The RLM also had other requirements for Dornier to satisfy. Since 1933 the Kriegsmarine had pressed for the formation of a Naval Air Arm. In January 1938 the Naval Air Arm Inspectorate of the Luftwaffe presented its requirements for a multi-role twin-engined all-metal aircraft which could also conduct maritime operations. On 5 February 1938 it was agreed with the General Staff. The ineffectiveness of horizontal bombing of ship targets had already been noted. At the Erprobungsstelle Travemünde military aviation test centre at Greifswald, training units together with a few naval air units practiced bombing the ship Zähringen with concrete bombs. The results were a two percent hit rate. Junkers Ju 87 dive bombers repeated the assault with a 40% hit rate. The superior accuracy of dive bombing was clearly demonstrated. The Luftwaffe also wanted a machine that could operate as a fighter aircraft to combat enemy aircraft. Essentially they wanted a "sea Stuka" (Junkers Ju 87). The aircraft was to have floats and a range of 1,500 kilometres (930 mi) and a maximum speed of 400 kilometres per hour (220 kn).

Dornier set about designing a floatplane. For hitting targets in the air and sea surface, four automatic weapons would be fitted in the nose. The armament would consist of two MG 17 machine guns (500 rounds of ammunition each) and two MG 204 (aka Lb 204) 20mm autocannon (200 rounds of ammunition) as part of the Dornier Do P.85 project (in German sources these were all classified as "machine guns", since the Luftwaffe considered anything 20mm or lower a "machine gun", rather than a cannon like Western nations, hence the "MG" designation). Heavy weapons consisted of one 500 kg or two 250 kg bombs for assaulting enemy warships. Dornier faced competition from Heinkel and Junkers who were developing the Junkers Ju 88 and Heinkel He 115. Instead of MG 204s, MG 151 or MG FF was installed instead. Defensive armament was to consist of MG 15s to cover the aft approach. In addition the payload could be modified to one 500 kilograms (1,100 lb) and eight 50 kilograms (110 lb) bombs or even two SC 500 bombs. The floats had a volume of 8,100 litres (1,800 imp gal) and were broken into compartments for safety reasons. Each float was to contain a fuel tank with a capacity of 500 litres (110 imp gal). The tail was to consist of the same twin stabilizer configuration as the Do 217, although a single fin was planned.

For dive bombing capability a dive brake was installed underneath the wing. The power plants were to reflect the speed requirements. It was envisaged as having two DB 601G engines, generating 1,300 horsepower (970 kW), or two Jumo 211s. The fuel tanks were located in the wing and fuselage which had a capacity for 2,000 litres (440 imp gal) of fuel and 190 litres (42 imp gal) of oil. At full weight the Dornier would reach 360 kilometres per hour (190 kn) and its effective range was expected to be 1,880 kilometres (1,170 mi). Its optimum range at an average cruising speed of 270 kilometres per hour (150 kn) at an altitude of 4,000 metres (13,000 ft), was 2,800 kilometres (1,700 mi). The specifications were dated 8 March 1938. The Do 217 lost out in the naval aircraft race to the Ju 88 and Blohm & Voss Ha 140, as the Luftwaffe favoured these designs owing to the Do 217 failing to live up to the specifications given. Although specifically ordered to cease development of the naval version of the Do 217, Dornier unofficially pursued the project and produced the Do 217W V1 and W V2 prototypes.

By the summer, 1940 the Luftwaffe had been using the Dornier Do 18, Heinkel He 115, Heinkel He 59, Heinkel He 111 and Junkers Ju 88 in maritime operations in the Baltic. At this point, the Ju 88 and He 111 equipped units were ordered to cease providing maritime support en masse. Instead, the Luftwaffe returned to the idea of the Do 217 and its floatplane version as a specialized naval attack aircraft. At the same time more plans were in place to produce extremely long-range aircraft (probably for operations deep in the Soviet Union). It is possible that the data sheet which Dornier gave the designation Do 217G was a part of that project. Unlike the Sea Stuka, a floatplane, the G was to carry an MG 151 mounted in the nose and three MG 15s fitted for defence. The G was expected to reach 14,900 kilograms (32,800 lb). It was still designed for a crew of four and equipped with sprung floats which would allow the aircraft to land in rough open seas. The G could also carry the entire variation of the E-1 bomb load it could carry a load twice that of the Do P.85 aircraft. However, the Do 217 E-1s performance was favoured. Nevertheless, the Gs design features figured and influenced the E-4 which went into production as the aircraft that was envisaged to be the backbone of the Luftwaffe's bomber fleet in the Battle of the Atlantic.

=== Focus on a heavy bomber ===
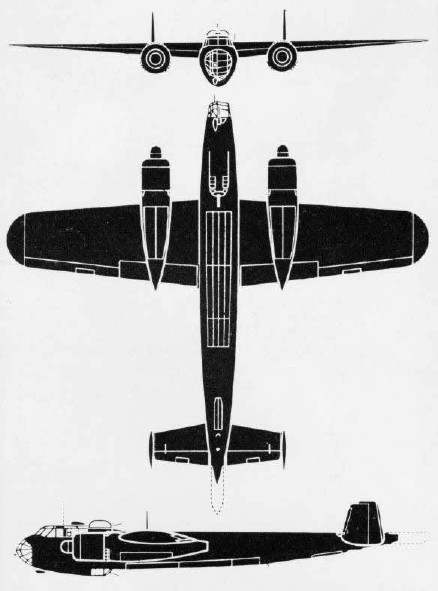
Outline of the Do 217E

At the end of August 1938 arguments against the floatplane version were made and proposing a land based aircraft to serve as a torpedo bomber, with more potential applications, were accepted. At the beginning of January 1939 the RLM stopped all work on the marine dive bomber version, as its estimated performance was not adequate. On 8 July 1939 Dornier issued a manufacturing specification for a glide bomb-deploying version for full maritime use. It was to be equipped with unitized BMW 801 engines. The Do 217 E had a new nose and the nose, cockpit rear, and ventral positions carried one MG 15 each. It was to carry a maximum bomb load of two SC 500 and two SC 250 bombs. It was also possible to carry an aerial mine or torpedo, for which the bomb bay had been substantially extended rearwards, nearly 70% longer than that of the earlier Do 17Z. A "clamshell"-like dive brake was fitted aft of the tail, with rear-hinged single dorsal and ventral panels. These features increased the design's weight to 10,500 kilograms (23,100 lb). Dornier had intended the speed to be in the region of 530 kilometres per hour (290 kn).

Superficially a bigger Dornier Do 215, and initially powered by the same engines, the Do 217 was actually considerably larger and totally different in both structural and aerodynamic design. The first prototype (the Do 217 V1) flew on 4 October 1938, but crashed seven days later during a single-engine flying test. The aircraft had been piloted by Rolf Koeppe, a flight commander at the central Erprobungsstelle facility at Rechlin. A Dornier mechanic, Eugen Bausenhart was also on board. It was found to be underpowered and was not manoeuvrable when compared with contemporary bombers. Instability was a problem at first, but modifications such as fixed Handley-Page leading edge slots along the leading edges of the vertical stabilizers helped to improve flight stability.

The second prototype flew on 5 November 1938. After arriving at Friedrichshafen in June 1939, further evaluations were scheduled to take place. Plans were made to install unitized Daimler-Benz DB 603 engines to enable the aircraft for high-altitude reconnaissance. This meant the fitting of a pressurized cabin. When Daimler-Benz failed to supply the engines, development came to a standstill. On 29 October the RLM ordered the aircraft to be scrapped, or a new use found for it.

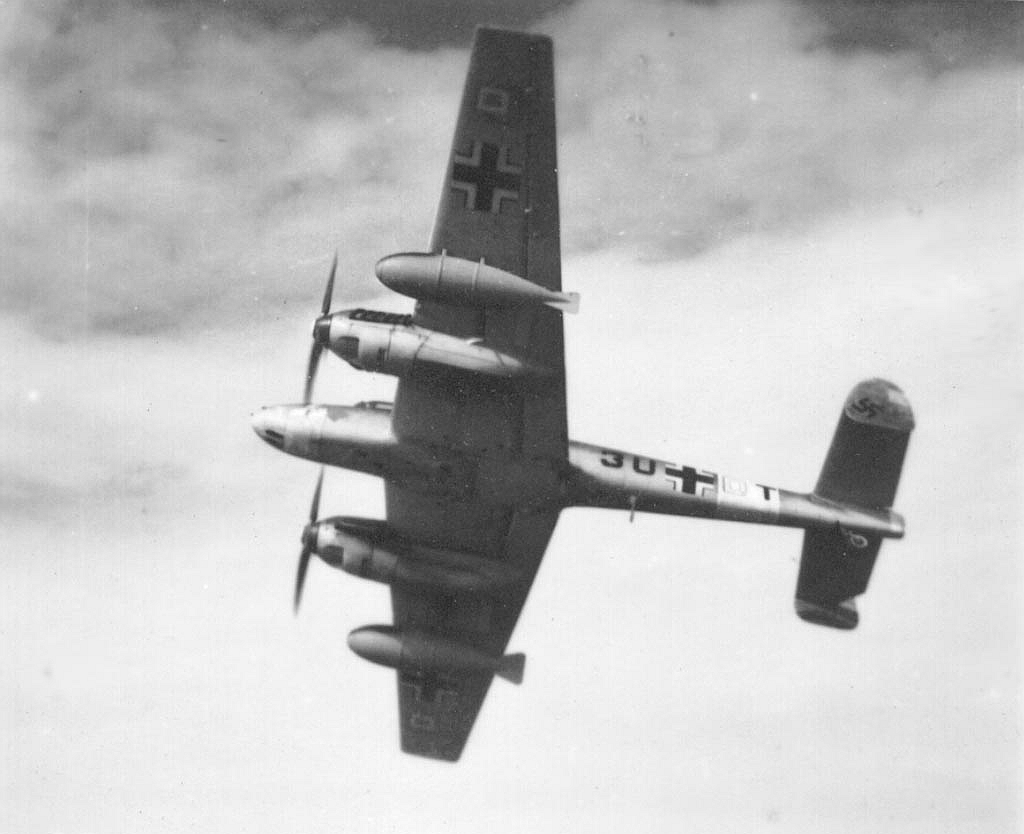
Bf 110 using standard 900-litre drop tanks, tested for the Do 217

A third prototype flew on 25 February 1939 with Jumo 211A engines in place of the DB 601s. On 15 August 1939 and 23 January 1940, the aircraft was flown to Rechlin, where it was tested in night flying trials. A number of the flights were to assess the performance of the new Siemens navigation aids under development. At the same time, Dornier also carried out fuel jettisoning and drop tank trials using the standardized 900 L capacity, vertical-finned drop tanks pioneered by the Bf 110D extended-range heavy fighter. As with the Do 17, the test team tried several tail configurations with the Do 217 V3. single, double and triangular-planform assemblies were tried. These designs were used in the Do 217 M-3, M-9 and Dornier Do 317.

The same units were used on the fourth prototype V4 which flew in April 1939 at Friedrichshafen and Rechlin. The Jumo proved to be superior, and the designers deemed them to be essential if the desired performance was to be achieved. In February 1941, the V4 began trials with the dive brake which was installed in the tail. This was to satisfy a demand for the Do 217 to conduct dive bombing missions. It also was fitted with a brake parachute to test the ability of the Dornier to conduct short landings. The parachute brake was also considered in use as a dive brake. The V5 prototype was fitted with them and flew in June 1939. Later it was retested with DB 601s and was the third of six aircraft given the official designation Do 217 A-0. The Jumo 211 B-1 was used in the V5 prototype. But in September 1939 the water pump and entire cooling system failed. On 28 April 1940 the DB 601 A-1s were fitted.

The V6 prototype was powered by Jumo 211B engines, but was also tested with DB 601s. The V7 was tested with BMW 139 engines, but as these had been abandoned for use in the Fw 190 fighter as early as 1939, use of the unpopular BMW 139 powerplants was never taken beyond the prototype stage. The V8 was given BMW 801 engines, which became the fixture for the entire E series. The Do 217A and C series were only built in small numbers. Owing to this the following D and F types never advanced beyond the design stage.

There was a desire for the Do 217 to be capable of performing dive bombing, so it was therefore fitted with the aforementioned, tail-mounted dive brakes, with dorsal and ventral panels that were hinged, "clamshell"-fashion, at the extreme rear of the tail extension they emerged from. This could not be made to function adequately in the early models however, and was omitted until the Do 217 E-2 entered service. When this mark reached service, use of the dive brake was found to sometimes overstrain the rear fuselage, so it was often removed.

The production specifications were ratified on 8 July 1939, with the ultimate goal of the Do 217 having the capability of flying maritime and land operations armed with glide bombs. The four-seat aircraft was adaptable to both land and maritime operations wherein the tactical emphasis was on bombing from a 50-degree dive angle, and it had a maximum speed of 680 kilometres per hour (370 kn). In contrast with earlier specifications for a modified version of the Do 17M, the proposed Do 217E had a new nose section design in which the A-Stand position was armed with a MG 15 machine gun. Additional MG 15s were to be located in the B and C-Stand gun emplacements. The design teams configured the bomb bay to carry two SC 500 and 250 bombs or four SC 250 bomb loads. In addition a LMB II aerial mine, or an F5 Torpedo could be loaded. Instead of the dive brakes being installed under the wings as on the R variant, it was placed on the tail of the aircraft. The design was tested in the E-1 and became the blueprint for all subsequent sub-variants. The E-1 carried strengthened wing and tail structures to deal with the upgraded armament, which increased the aircraft's weight.

== Basic design (Do 217 E-2) ==
=== Wing ===
The Do 217 was a shoulder-wing cantilever monoplane. Its two-spar wing was built in three sections: the centre section, incorporating part of the fuselage, and two outer wing sections with very little taper on the leading and trailing edges, leading out to a pair of broad, semi-circular wing tips. The stress bearing skin was riveted to spars and ribs. Owing to its future use as a dive-bomber, stressed skin construction was employed with the use of Z-section frames and stringers. Slotted ailerons were fitted to the outer wing sections. The inner split flaps were electrically operated and had a maximum flap angle of 55°. The ailerons were linked to the flap system to permit partial operation as flaperons, meaning if the flaps were lowered the ailerons drooped down. The design of the rear and front spar attachments revealed the flanges of the spar were flushed with the wing surface making the most efficient structure. The outer wing leading edges were double-skinned. In the wing space, a hot air feed was fitted, using heat pumped through lagged pipes from the engines to warm up and de-ice the wings. The ducts were located just forward of the front spar flanges and in between the main spars where they could escape into the wing. The hot air could escape through the apertures at the aileron hinges. A diversion pipe was also installed in the engine nacelle, which could shut down the hot air flow to the ducts and divert the air out through bottom end of the nacelle if de-icing was not required. The fuel and oil tanks were located in the wing and centre section. The two outer fuel tanks were located next to the outer side of the engine nacelle. The outermost fuel tank contained a 160 litres (35 imp gal) fuel capacity, while the tank closest to the engine could accommodate 44 imperial gallons (200 L) of oil. Both were sandwiched in between the main and rear main spar. Between the fuselage and inner side of the engine nacelle, the 795 litres (175 imp gal) main tanks were located. In the centre section a 1,050 litres (230 imp gal) fuel tank was installed forward of the bomb bay.

=== Fuselage ===
The fuselage was an all-metal structure built in three main sections: the nose section, which accommodated the crew; the section including the wing centre section; and the rear fuselage. The main structure had a conventional stringer and former framework, to which stressed skin was riveted. The centre and rear sections were divided in the horizontal plane to within a couple of metres of the tail. The lower half of the fuselage contained the bomb cells, while the remainder and upper parts contained the bracing frames which supported and kept the bomb load secure. In the lower half of the fuselage the bomb bay extended past the trailing edge wing roots to nearly a quarter of the way down the rear fuselage. Extra doors were added for torpedo operations against Naval targets. The extreme rear of the fuselage contained stowage space for anti-shipping weapons. In the upper fuselage, directly above the forward bomb cells in the centre section, just aft of the cockpit, the 242 gallon fuel tank was located. This had a jettison pipe which was attached to the roof of the fuselage and extended to behind the tail wheel. Above the two rear bomb cells in the centre section there was an armoured dinghy stowage place. Either side of the dinghy, aft of the 242 imperial gallons (1,100 L) fuel tank, and directly above the rear bomb bay, were the oxygen bottles.

The tail wheel was retractable and had its own folding doors. The tip of the fuselage could be removed to allow quick access to the jack mechanism which controlled the tail plane incidence and pivot. The tail incidence was automatically changed when the landing flaps were lowered; it could also be adjusted manually. This tip would be replaced by dive brakes in the event the Dornier was required to attack precision targets. The horizontal stabilizer surfaces were conventional, as part of a twin tail empennage with "endplate" vertical fin/rudder units, as on the previous production Do 17 airframes. The rudder contained a balance tab while the elevators contained an elevator balance tab and an automatic dive pull-out tab, in the event of a dive-bombing mission. The stabilisers were fitted with fixed slats, with the trailing edges of the slats positioned inside of the fins. The rudders had very narrow horn balances (the amount of rudder or active control surface forward of the rudder-stabilizer hinge) which allowed for better balance, and the trimming tabs extended the full length of the stabilizers trailing edges. The stabilizers also had the Handley-Page leading edge slots installed on the inboard side.

=== Powerplants ===
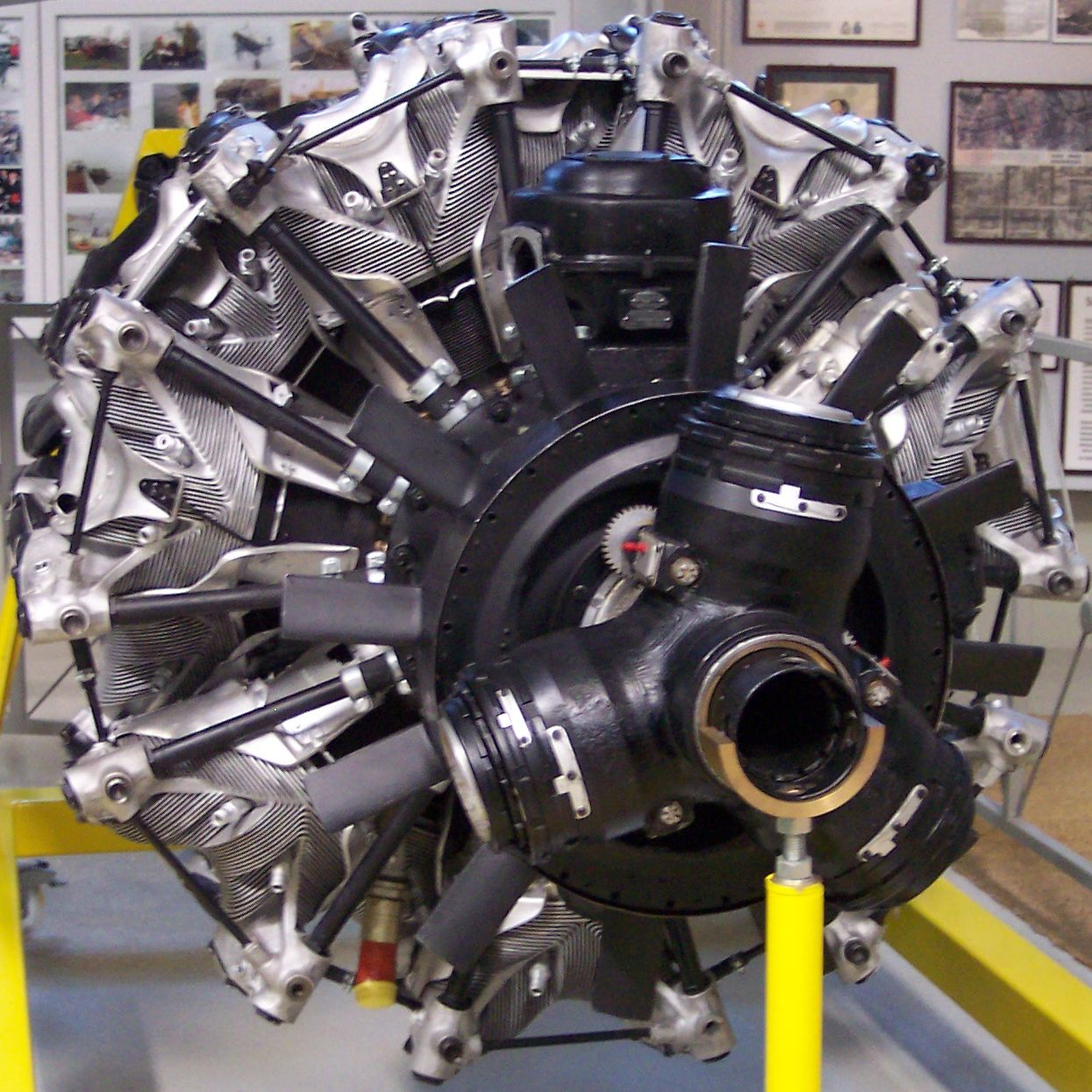
The BMW 801 series powered the Do 217E variants.

All the Do 217E variants were fitted with unitized, BMW 801A air-cooled 14-cylinder radial aircraft engine. The early E-series variants were intended to be fitted with a BMW 801B engine on the port side to give counter-rotating propellers. The engines were mounted on welded steel tube mountings at the extremities of the wing centre section. The oil coolers were integral to the front lower section of the BMW-designed cowlings, as used in all twin and multi-engined aircraft that used BMW 801 radials for power. The machine had two oil and five fuel tanks which were protected with rubber and self-sealing coverings. In an emergency, CO_{2} could be released into the tanks to extinguish fires. The engines had three-blade, light alloy VDM propeller units. Flame dampers were also fitted in the form of "fish tail" exhaust pipes. Such a configuration gave a speed of 470 kilometres per hour (250 kn) (282 mph) at sea level and 530 kilometres per hour (290 kn) (318 mph) at 6,700 metres (22,000 ft). It enabled a service ceiling of 7,300 metres (24,000 ft) when fully loaded and 8,200 metres (26,900 ft) when lightly loaded. The Do 217's range was a much more impressive 3,900 kilometres (2,400 mi), (compared with the other German bomber types).

The engines and their supporting struts were positioned well forward of the leading edge, allowing plenty of room for the undercarriage and other components. In the upper forward part of the nacelle the de-icing tank was located. The undercarriage was the main structure in this part of the aircraft. Each main unit comprised two oleo legs and a single wheel. It was retracted electrically via the crew in the cockpit. The adoption by the Luftwaffe midway through the war, of a general system of unitized powerplant installations for twin and multi-engined combat aircraft incorporating as many of the engine's auxiliary components (radiator and oil cooler, and all fluid and mechanical connections) into a single, easily interchangeable unitized "bolt-on" package, known as the Kraftei (power-egg) concept, was being widely adopted by the time of the Do 217's initial frontline appearance. The Junkers Jumo 211 was one of the first engines to be unitized as seen on the Ju 88A, with the BMW 801 radial and Daimler-Benz DB 603 following not long afterwards, as both the BMW radial and the DB 603 inline engines were to be used in such a "unitized" format to power the frontline models of the Do 217.

=== Cockpit ===
The Do 217 usually carried a crew of four. Included were a pilot, an observer/bomb aimer/forward gunner, dorsal gunner/radio operator and a flight engineer/ventral gunner. As with the Dornier Do 17, the crew were positioned in the cockpit cabin forward of the engines and leading edge. The pilot sat on the port side, with a spectacle-type control column mounted on a swinging arm centred in the instrument panel. The entire arm could be swung 180 degrees to starboard, placing the yoke in front of the bombardier, in case of emergencies. In the later Do 217K and M with stepless windscreen, the centre pivot was mounted on a rocking control arm or pedestal, rather than a sliding piston, since the instrument panel itself was eliminated (replaced with smaller panels holding the gauges, hung from the edge of the fuselage wall and from the glazing frames above the yoke, respectively.) The bomb aimer sat on his immediate right, slightly below and behind. In combat he could move forward into the nose and operate the bomb release gear or aim the forward machine gun (or 20 mm cannon). On the right side of the nose, the bomb aimer's window penetrates the cockpit and is visible as a bulge on the exterior. Back-to-back with the bombardiers seat, the flight engineer/ventral gunner sat on the port side, his seat facing to the rear. The seat of the ventral gunner/flight engineer was next to the radio operator facing forward, behind the bomb aimer. During operations the ventral gunner/engineer would lie on his stomach facing aft, his post as a gunner taking immediate and first priority. The radio-operator/dorsal gunner sat in a pivoting seat in the extreme rear, above the ventral gun position. His head was inside the B-Stand gun position, and the instruments mounted in a semi-circle around his torso level. The pilot had a curved shield of armour plating, 8.5 mm thick, placed behind his seat. His seat had a further 5mm (1/4 in) of armour and another 5mm (1/4 in) plate above his head, installed in the top of the cockpit roof. The dorsal gunner was also protected by armour plating. The Funkgerät or FuG radio communication device compartments were located in the extreme rear of the cockpit, near the leading edge. The automatic pilot panel was located next to the FuG boxes. In the right-rear of the cockpit the piping that was also attached to the de-icing ducts in the wings also entered the cockpit, as part of a single heating system to emit warm air to heat the cabin if needed. The FuG X, 16, navigational direction finder PeilG V direction finder (PeilG – Peilgerät) and the FuG 25 IFF and FuBI 2 blind landing devices were used in the E-2.

=== Armament ===
The defensive armament consisted of an A-Stand (forward firing machine gun position) in the nose with a MG 15 machine gun. In the C-Stand (lower rear gun emplacement) at the rear end of the undernose Bola gondola – a standard feature on many German twin-engined bombers – and a B-Stand position (rear-upper gun post) at the rear of the cockpit glazing, the crew were provided with MG 15 (E-1) or MG 131 machine guns (E-2). In the side of the cockpit, two MG 15s were mounted (one on each side) on bearings. As well as the manual machine gun positions, the E-2 was equipped with a Drehlafette DL 131 rotating turret armed with a 13 mm machine gun. In some instances, a moveable 20 mm cannon was fitted in the nose and a fixed 15 mm weapon was installed in the floor of the nose. The weapons could be controlled by the pilot, via a firing button located on the yoke. To assist in acquiring his target, a Revi C12/C was installed in the cockpit.

The maximum permissible bomb load of the E-series without sacrificing fuel load was 3,500 kilograms (7,700 lb) of bombs of which a maximum of 3,000 kg could be carried internally. To have the maximum load of 4,000 kg, part of the 1,050 litres (230 imp gal) fuselage fuel tank had to be sacrificed. If long-distance operations had to be flown, drop tanks could be fitted under the wings, which affected speed. Beside the bomb load a LT F5 Torpedo could be carried in its long bomb bay, as well as three aerial mines (the E-1 did not carry the mine load of the E-2).

== Level and dive bomber variants – radial-engined ==
=== Do 217 E ===
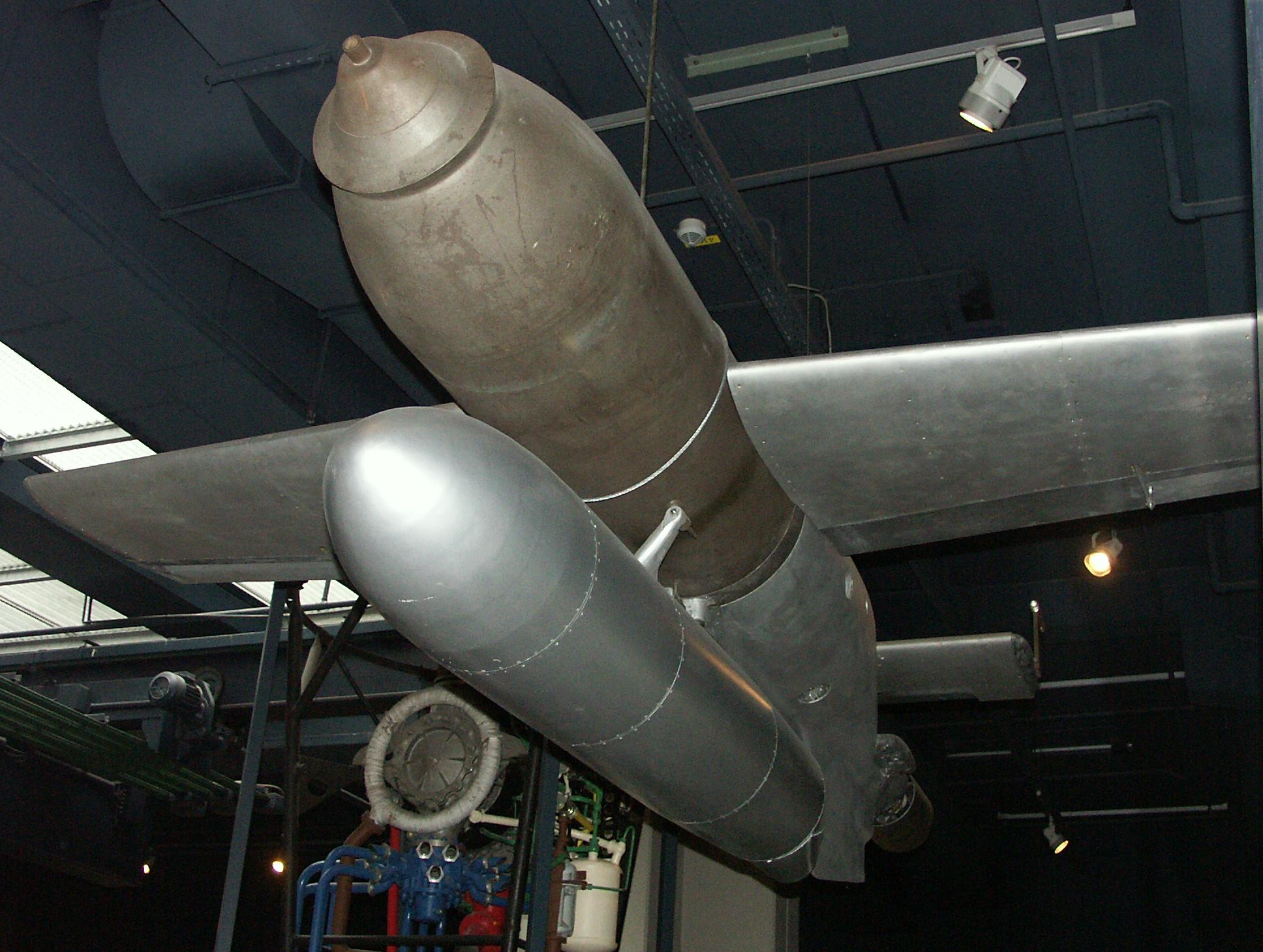
Henschel Hs 293 missile with added "Kopfring" (lit. "head ring") on the nose for nautical targets. It was first tested with the E variant.

The E series was the initial major production variant, based on V9 prototype, and powered by two BMW 801 radial engines. Deepened fuselage with larger bomb-bay, entered production in 1940. The V9 had been planned as the prototype for the E-1 variant. The V9 had a fixed MG 151 with 250 rounds of ammunition while the MG 204 was to be installed in the nose. The type was fitted with a dummy run of Lofte 7 and BZA 1 bombing systems. The main armament was to be a single torpedo of either SD 1000 or SC 1800 standard. When the mock up had been given the green light for technical development construction began in the spring, 1940. During September 1940 engine vibration problems were experienced but fixed quickly. During flight tests it was discovered the air brake caused a speed loss of 2 metres per second (4.5 mph). The V9 underwent heavy tests and was withdrawn to Rechlin, where it acted as a prototype until at least October 1943. During this time it also had trials with BMW 801A and BMW 801G engines.

==== Do 217 E-0 and E-1 ====
The E-0 was a pre-production bomber/reconnaissance version of Do 217E. It was powered by BMW 801A engines and armed with one forward firing 15 mm MG 151 cannon and five 7.92 mm MG 15 machine guns on gimbal mounts. It entered production and service in late 1940. Continued development led to the Do 217 E-1. The Do 217 E-1 first flew on 1 October 1940. Full production level bomber/reconnaissance variant, similar to the E-0, and followed it into production and service in late 1940, 94 were built. Additional armament consisted of a 20 mm cannon fitted in the nose. Its power plants were BMW 801s of 1,560 PS (1,539 horsepower (1,148 kW)). The aircraft could carry an internal bombload of 2,000 kg. Alternatively, it could carry a load of two LMW aerial mines or one torpedo. The E-2 could carry three mines.

In late 1940, testing under operational conditions began. By March 1941, 37 217s had been built and test flown. Many of the E-1 variants, now being built in increasing numbers, were selected for conversion to the new improved fighter variants; the planned 217H, P and R series. A large number of these "fighter/bomber" aircraft were put through severe testing runs between July and September 1941. Dornier was able to gain valuable knowledge for the future improvement of the armament and bomb jettisoning systems. Of the first six prototypes, two (the third and sixth) were delivered to operational units. The third, Wrk Nr. 1003 was lost on 22 May 1941 (at Rechlin) and 1006, the sixth prototype, was severely damaged on 11 April 1941 whilst with Kampfgeschwader 40.

==== Do 217 E-2 ====
The E-2 was designated as a level and dive bomber, which could be fitted with a clamshell-type dive brake mounted on the fuselage aft of the elevator's trailing edge, with rear-end-hinged dorsal and ventral panels opened and closed by a jackscrew. It was powered by BMW 801L engines and armed with forward firing 15 mm MG 151, a single MG 131 machine gun in the dorsal turret, an MG 131 flexibly mounted at the rear of the ventral gondola and three MG-15 machine guns. The E-2 entered production slightly later than the E-3 level bomber, and was produced in parallel, a total of 185 being built and entering service from the summer of 1941.

The Luftwaffe continued to develop the E series. Not satisfied with the E-1, it perfected a modified version it designated the E-2. Testing was not complete until March 1942. Improvements were added to existing E-1s, which were already being produced by late 1940, and to the prototypes V2 and V4 which would serve as the prototypes for the E-2. The V2 was given the DB 601 engines and a third aircraft, designated V4, was tested with Jumo 211s. Studies of the aircraft began on 15 August 1939, running concurrently with the development of the E-1s. Level, dive and torpedo carrying roles were all examined. Emphasis was also placed on developing a reliable reconnaissance type. These developments were significant as the trials undertaken by the E-1 prototype had not shown any negative characteristics. Level bombing tests were very positive. Only glide-bombing attacks using interception control, and with dive-brakes open, did not quite match the stringent specifications set some four years earlier. According to the test pilots, the aircraft performed well with either the DB 601A, Jumo 211A/B, or even the BMW 801A-1 engines. Pleasing the designers, the test pilots also noted that with all auxiliary bomb racks removed test flights showed at an altitude of 6,000 metres, the Do 217 was quite capable of making an operational range of 2,400 km. With the addition of two 900-litre tanks, it increased to 3,700 km.

The BMW 801 was the preferred powerplant, and although it had been tested by the summer of 1942, the lack of replacements, low production and their use in the Focke-Wulf Fw 190 series prevented large-scale operational testing under combat conditions. In September 1941 flame dampeners were fitted and testing completed. Further innovations were made regarding the installment of reconnaissance equipment, namely the standard Rb 20/30 cameras. During this final phase, plans to construct and designate an E-1b with MG 131 turret was explored, but later shelved. Modifications were also made on the already operational E-1s before the E-2 entered service. One such modification was the installation of MG FF 20 mm cannons, the installation of a hand-held MG 131 in the forward-facing glazing of the cockpit and a MG 131 turret facing aft in the B position (rear cockpit covering the rear). De-icing systems were also installed in the cabin and tailplane for high altitude operations.

Production of the E-2 began in March 1942. About twelve of the 280 produced at Friedrichshafen were used as testbeds to keep pace with the constantly changing series specifications. Two, Wrk. Nr. 1221 and 1228, served as testbeds for the BMW 801 L-2 engines as well as flights to assess the installation of auxiliary 300-, 900- and 1,200-litre fuel tanks. During this time, an E-2 equipped with lattice-type airbrakes appeared. It had been designed in June 1940. Its weaponry consisted of a fixed MG 151 in its nose and a MG 15 and the A position. Three rotating positions were put in the B and C stand positions. The machine resembled the Junkers Ju 188. Later it was installed with Kutonase (cable cutting equipment). The Do 217 E-1 and E-2 could reach 535 km/h at 5,300 m and none had a problem with maintaining altitude with BMW 801s, even with weapons, dive-brakes and dampers added, provided it had an all-up-weight of less than twelve tonnes. Machines over thirteen tonnes were difficult to handle and needed experienced pilots at the controls.

The failure of the Heinkel He 111, Dornier Do 17, and Junkers Ju 88 during the Battle of Britain and the Blitz led the OKL to see the Do 217 as the only heavy bomber with the range, bombload and defences for long-range bombing. The E-2 had incorporated all the new design features such as the Drehlafette DL 131 turret and a modified bomb bay which allowed to hold 3,000 kg of bombs. The E-1s originally were given the FuG X, 16, 25 and PeilG V and FuBI 1 radio sets and navigation aids. The E-2 was given the FuBI2. In the next two variants, the E-3 and E-4, the Siemens FuG 101 radio altimeter was also added enabling the pilot to conduct more accurate and safer low-level attacks. The E-1 had Rüstsätz /R1 racks for 1,800 kg of bombs, the /R2 wing rack and /R3s for 50 kg of bombs. Dornier wanted to increase the strength of the racks to increase the size of external loads. A specialist company which had often collaborated with Dornier, Technischer Aussendienst, developed the /R20 rack which enabled heavier loads to be carried. The /R20 enabled fixed MG 81Zs to be installed in the tail cone. The previous lattice air brake was removed; the drag was too much and it bent the fuselage out of shape, making the aircraft unsafe and hastening metal fatigue.

==== Do 217 E-3 to E-5 ====
In the E-3, additional armour was fitted to protect crew. Armed with forward firing 20 mm MG FF cannon and seven MG 15 machine guns. (Despite the large number of machine guns, the defensive weight of fire was light, with five of the gimbal mounted machine guns to be operated by the radio-operator, who could only use one at a time).

The E-4 was similar to the E-2, which it replaced in production, but with the dive brakes removed. It was fitted with Kuto-Nase barrage-balloon cable cutters in the leading edge of the wings. 258 E-3 and E-4 were built. The E-4 was identical to the E-2, with the exception of the heavy MG FF in the nose. Five of the six positions were flexible, with only one fixed gun; the MG FF installed along the floor, just off centre. The cannon in the nose could be moved. Both were powered by BMW 801L engines.

The E-5 was a modified version of E-4 for anti-shipping operations. It was fitted with a bomb carrier for a Henschel Hs 293 glide bomb or a drop tank under each of the outer wings, and carried the appropriate Kehl series radio guidance and control transmitter system for the missile. It was usually operated with a missile under the starboard wing and a drop tank under the port wing. Sixty-seven were new-built with additional 34 converted from E-4 airframes.

Testing with glide bombs was halted as the electrics were too sensitive to moisture, rockets prone to icing and the radio valves in the control units (in the aircraft) were disrupted by vibrations. By May 1942, hit rates were just 50 percent. In April 1942, the first E-5 reached the test centres at Peenemünde. Various test were made with aircraft with anywhere from 15.4 and 16.5 tonnes in all up weight. Often these tests were made to assess flight characteristics when carrying glide bombs such as the Hs 293. The E-5 was given heating units to keep the cold from the heat-sensitive glide bombs' electrics. With external ETCs, but without Glide bombs and auxiliary fuel tanks, the E-5 could attain of a speed of 480 km/h at 5,000 m. With two external stores, its speed was reduced to 445 km/h and its weight, including 4,300 litres of fuel, was 16.85 tonnes. The Do 217 E-2/U1 was used as an E-5 prototype. Whether an E series Do 217 ever launched a Hs 294 glide bomb is unclear. The only known fact is that a Do 217 flew a Hs 294 to Berlin-Schonefeld in May 1943. The first launch of the missile was done from a Messerschmitt Bf 110, and thereafter was taken over by the Heinkel He 177 equipped with the FuG 203 Kehl transmitter to control the missile. Only the Do 217, He 177 and Focke-Wulf Fw 200 could carry a Hs 293/4 or Fritz X missile.

=== Do 217 K ===
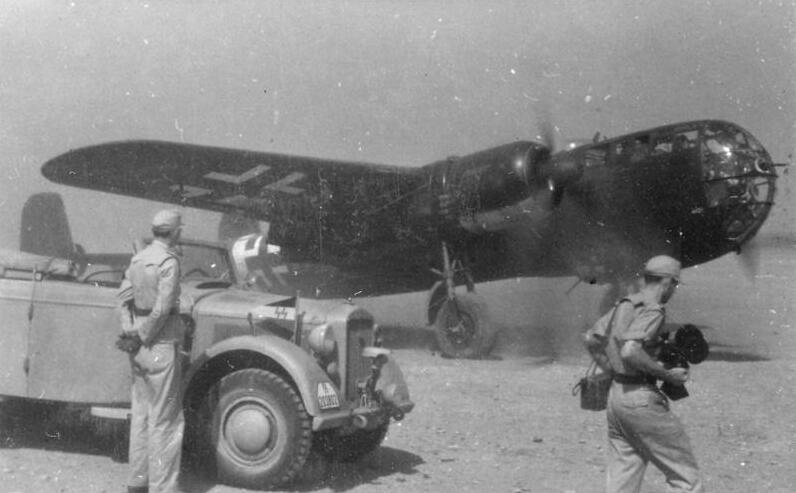
Do 217K-1, with the K-version's standard "stepless cockpit"

To replace the Do 217, the RLM planned for the He 177 A-3 and A-5 to be the long-range carrier aircraft for missiles, owing to the lack of BMW engines to power the Dornier but problems with the engine reliability of the He 177A led to the failure of the plan. The Battle of Stalingrad used up more and more aircrew which prevented them retraining on the Do 217 for glide bomb operations. Owing to the problems with the He 177A, Air Inspector General Erhard Milch returned his attention to the Do 217 and demanded a greater number of improved variants for Precision-guided munition (PGM) operations.

In early 1942, tests on a new and improved, completely glazed cockpit for the Do 217 series had been underway at the Hamburger Schiffbauanstalt (Hamburg Shipbuilding Institute). E-2s were fitted with a new streamlined "stepless cockpit" following its conceptual debut in January 1938 for the He 111P, as this design philosophy became the standard for almost all German bombers later in World War II, which eliminated the separate windscreen panels for the pilot of earlier versions of the Do 217. The lower nose of the K-version also retained the Bola inverted-casemate gondola for a rearwards-aimed ventral defensive armament emplacement, with its forward end fully incorporated with the new nose glazing design. The testing for this new well-framed cockpit glazing format for the later models of the Do 217, was carried out at the Shipbuilding Institute in Hamburg. The design of the cockpit was put to the test using water pressure to simulate a speed of 700 km/h. Only a few of the glass panels failed, caused by inadequate mounting. The cabin design passed the tests easily. Initial flights took place on 31 March 1942 after teething problems had been resolved. The Do 217 K V1 flew with BMW 801A-1s from Löwenthal and Erprobungsstelle Rechlin. This was followed by the ten-airframe pre-production batch, Do 217 K-01 to K-010. Mass production of the Do 217 K-1 began at the Dornier factory at Wismar.

The first prototype, a modified E-2 flew on 31 March 1942, with the aircraft showing higher maximum speed owing to reduced drag. The Do 217 K entered production from September 1942. BMW believed that the type could reach an operational ceiling of 7,000 m, notwithstanding a MTOW of 16.8 tonnes. Tests at Peenemünde in June and July 1943 showed that while the Do 217K could carry and deploy a Fritz-X PGM, it was still controllable.

==== Do 217 K-1 ====
The Do 217 K-1 was a night bomber version with the 1560 PS BMW 801L engine. It carried the same crew of four in the "stepless cockpit" crew compartment with a revised defensive armament of a twin-barreled 7.92 mm MG 81Z machine gun in the nose, two single MG 81s or twin-barrelled MG 81Z in beam positions, a MG 131 in the B stand position dorsal turret, the DL 131/1C, and another in a ventral position inserted in a Walzenlafette WL 131/1 cylindrical carriage at the rear of its Bola gondola. 220 were built. It had an average flying weight of 12,700 kg, this aircraft achieved speeds of 520 km/h at 5,200 m.

The K-1 was equipped with GM 1 nitrous oxide boost, which increased its maximum speed by 84 km/h at 8,000 m at a rate of 100 g/s. With 50 g/s the aircraft's operational ceiling could be extended from 8,400 to 9,800 metres. Failure rates of the GM 1 were very high and attention was shifting to other Do 217 variants and the use of GM 1 soon stopped. Serious shortages of the BMW 801 led to the cancellation of the K series but tests with BMW 801ML Motoranlage unitized-mount format radial engines, added a supplementary command unit to the usual 801 Kommandogerät engine control unit for each radial, which could engage the booster switch, ignition timing and the weak-rich mixture control automatically, which made the 801L powerplants easy to operate. Oil pressures also triggered operation of the VDM propellers, which on the K-1 subtype were 3.9 m in diameter. A smaller, 3.8 meter diameter wood-bladed propeller could be used as an alternative, though with a slight loss of speed. The standard 2,165-litre fuel tank could be supplemented by two fuselage tanks with 700-litre capacity or with either the standardized Luftwaffe 300-litre drop tank used on many German front-line military aircraft or fin-stabilized 900-litre drop tank as the Bf 110D used. An all-up-weight of 15 to 16.5 tonnes could be expected. The K-1 would need some 850 to 1,110 m to get airborne. Taking off from a grass strip, an altitude of 20 m was reached after 1,500 m and from a concrete runway it was 1,300. With two auxiliary tanks its speed dropped by 4.5 percent, and with bombs, by 6 percent. Flame-damper equipment also caused serious speed reductions; 7 percent in level flight and 9 percent when at operational ceiling.

==== Do 217 K-2 ====
This was a specialised anti-shipping version based on the K-1, intended to carry the Fritz X guided bomb, being fitted with pylon-faired hardpoints to allow carriage of two Fritz Xs inboard of the engines and the FuG 203 Kehl guidance system. It had longer-span wings (24.8 m (81 ft 4 1/2 in) compared with 19 m (62 ft 4 in) for the K-1) to give better high-altitude performance when carrying the heavy Fritz-X bombs. 50 were converted from K-1 airframes. The wing area was expanded by a total of 67 m^{2}, but most of the K-2s internal equipment was the same as the K-1. The increase in area was to increase high-altitude performance. Some of the K-2s had a rigid tail MG 81Z which was not especially effective. It was loaded with 350 rounds and controlled by the use of a rear-facing telescope mounted in the forward section of the canopy left of the pilot. Either the gunners or pilot could fire the weapon, which could be jettisoned in case of an emergency to reduce weight.

==== Do 217 K-3 ====
The next variant was the Do 217 K-3. A revised anti-shipping version, the Do 217 K-3 was similar to the K-2 but fitted with improved FuG 203-series Kehl missile guidance equipment for Fritz-X glide-bombs or Hs 293 missiles. 40 were converted from M-1 airframes. It was given the K-2s larger wings. When fitted with external ETC weapons racks it was named the K-3/U1. It had improved armament, a MG 81Z and MG 81 J in the nose. The K-3 did not roll off the production lines until the beginning of 1944. The Dornier Do 217 M-11, its intended successor as the standard missile platform, was only produced in small numbers owing to lack of production capacity.

== Level and dive bomber variants – inline-engined ==
=== Do 217 M ===
As the BMW 801 radial engine used by the Do 217K was in great demand for the Fw 190 fighter, the Do 217M, a version powered by Kraftei-unitized installation versions of the largest displacement inverted V12 then in service, the 44.5-litre displacement Daimler-Benz DB 603 liquid-cooled inverted V12 engine, was developed in parallel with the 217K. It shared the new forward fuselage of the 217K, with the first prototype flying on 16 June 1942. According to RLM plans, production of the M model, which was powered by DB 603 A-1s was due to commence with two aircraft in May 1942 and 10 M-1s in the summer. By March 1943 a production target of 42 aircraft per month was to be achieved. The DB 603 A-3 was chosen as the increased performance handed the aircraft improved characteristics. However, it had not been fully tested and a number of technical problems arose. A Do 217H (a glider-bomber for land operations with E-2 airframe) would be used for endurance testing. This would provide useful testing evaluations for the M-1.

The M V1 was to be the first prototype. It was an E-2 conversion with altered cockpit and DB 603 engines and operated from the central Luftwaffe Erprobungstelle aircraft test centre at Rechlin from September 1942. During the winter, the prototype performed long-range and high-altitude flights. On 16 November it was forced landed for unstated reasons. Different engine-cooling systems were tried and flame retarders added, although the addition of the dampers caused a reduction in speed of 15 to 25 km/h depending on altitude. The first production prototype series M-0 aircraft (M-01) crashed in Lake Müritz, just north of the Rechlin test base, on 9 September 1942, while on an engine test. The M-02 was given wing reduction to 59 m^{2}, which became the predecessor of the M-3. The M-03 refined the design with DB 603 A-1 engines but crashed after a mid-air collision with a Dornier Do 215 on 14 May 1943. Six 0-series aircraft (Wrk Nr. 1241 to 1245) were manufactured. Rechlin log books included frequent references to a M-04 from December 1942 to May 1943. This aircraft was apparently used for de-icing and cabin heating tests as well as high-altitude testing with DB603s. Some M-0s were used to evaluate performance with glide bombs (Wrk Nr. 1244 and 1245). These aircraft were named M-0/U1. Each had an ETC 2000 XII, under the fuselage.

==== Do 217 M-1 ====
The M-1 night bomber version, equivalent to Do 217 K-1 but with DB603A engines, carried similar armament and bomb load to K-1. Daimler-Benz DB 601s were also used on some variants to keep the airframes in service (the shortage of powerplants made this difficult). Mostly though, DB603A-1 engines were used on the M-1, its only major difference from the K series. The M-1/Umrüst-Bausätze 1 (abbreviated "/U1") incorporated the M defensive armament and the lattice air brake of the E-2. The MG 81Z and 131 were to be replaced by the MG 151 in the A-stand position. Problems with the air brakes prevented serial conversions. By November 1943 the M-1/U1 had matured into a night bomber with anti-glare protection in the cabin. The machine was equipped with a MG 131 in the nose, two MG 81Js in the cabin windows and two MG 131s in the B and C stand. Some M-1/U2s were fitted for deployment of German PGM guided ordnance with the required FuG 203d Kehl IV guidance transmitter, and rear-looking FuG 216 Neptun R radar equipment. 438 M-1 were built by Dornier in Munich and Wismar.

==== Do 217 M-2 to M-11 ====
Torpedo-bomber version of Do 217M. Only a single prototype was built, the Junkers Ju 88 being chosen as a torpedo-bomber instead. The M-5 series was a modified version of M-1 fitted with Hs 293 missile recessed under fuselage. Only one prototype was built. The last in the M series was the M-11. It was a revised anti-shipping version of M-1, with extended wings of K-2 and provision for one Fritz-X or Hs-293 under fuselage. 37 M-11 were converted from M-1 airframes.

==== Do 217 R ====
In 1941, Dornier worked out a derivative of the Do 217M with dive brakes, a greater wing area, and increased defensive armament, designated Do 217R. Three Do 217R versions were planned, the baseline Do 217R-0 powered by either DB 603As or BMW 801ML, the Do 217R-1 dive bomber/torpedo bomber, and the Do 217R-2 dive bomber. Four Do 217R prototypes were converted from existing airframes, the first of which flew on August 6, 1942, but the Do 217R did not go into production.

== Night fighter variants ==
=== Do 217 J ===
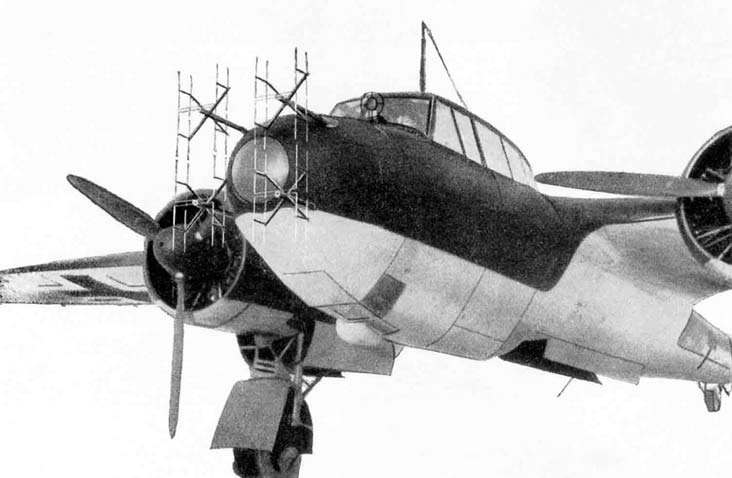
Nose of prototype Do 17 Z-10 Kauz II night fighter, similar to that of the Do 217 J, equipped with Matratze (mattress) 32-dipole radar antenna for its UHF-band early model Lichtenstein BC AI radar gear

In 1941, with Germany under increased night-time attack by RAF Bomber Command and with shortages of the Messerschmitt Bf 110 and the preferred Junkers Ju 88C night fighters, it was decided to supplement the night-fighter force with a version of the Do 217 E, despite its much greater size and 15-ton weight. This aircraft, the Do 217 J, was fitted with a new "solid" nose, similar to that used by Dornier in night fighter versions of the Do 17 and Do 215, with four forward firing 2 cm MG FF cannon and four 7.92 mm machine guns. By October 1940, the production of heavy night fighters and night fighters such as the Do 217 and Ju 88, had been discussed comprehensively and by 5 November 1941 these discussions had been concluded. On 23 November the Technische Amt (T.A.) had ordered the Dornier bomber fleet to be withdrawn in accordance with a decision made earlier that year on 23 May. Dornier designated the subject of their new project the "Do 217 Z", later renamed the Do 217 J.

The Japanese Imperial Navy and Japanese Army Air Force had also taken an interest in license building the type in mid-1942, demonstrating the type's potential. The Luftwaffe, however, had no intention of delivering the Do 217 to Japan, and none were ever exported. Dornier encountered many problems in procuring the BMW 801 engines required for the night fighter versions. Junkers had also struggled with BMW deliveries, its Ju 88C variants were to be powered by the BMW as the initial Jumo 211B/F engine plan had been abandoned. The Do 217s competitor, the Ju 88 C, had only four fixed guns, whereas the Dornier could hold eight. In most cases, the Ju 88 C carried only one 2 cm MG FF and three 7.92 mm MG 17s.

In January 1941 Junkers concentrated on the C variant designs. It planned on producing 60 C-4s and 374 C-6s powered by Jumo 211s. It later transpired to Dornier that Junkers also wanted the BMW 801 to power the C-6. The power plants would also be supplemented with GM-1 nitrous oxide injection engine performance boosters for greater performance or alternatively, using the new, more powerful Jumo 213. The Ju 88s weaponry was improved by the addition of one or two MG FFs in the fuselage. Both the Do 217 and Ju 88 used the FuG 202 Lichtenstein B/C sets, but later Ju 88s were given FuG 212 Lichtenstein C-1s and later FuG 220s. The equipment of the Dornier did not change. Against this competition Dornier needed to improve the types' abilities as a night fighter. The first problem Dornier attempted to overcome was long and short range capabilities. A modified E-1, (Wrk Nr. 42) was used to test the equipment for the forthcoming Do 217 J. During testing the characteristics of the various types fire extinguisher hardware were carried out. Performance trials were carried out in January 1942 using an E-2, Wrk Nr. 1122 which was put through its paces at the Löwenthal testing facility.

Dornier intended the prototype to ready by February 1942. The machine, Wrk Nr. 1134, was a modified E-2 and equipped with FuG 202 and a Spanner-Anlage Infrared gun sight. These systems enabled the Dornier to detect the heat signature of enemy aircraft. Heat seeking detection at limited range making the Dornier a good proposition for the Defence of the Reich campaign. Testing was set back as the prototype crashed owing to engine failure. The continuing slow development of the IR equipment precluded its use in the J-1. Work on the IR program was sped up until late 1943. Modified IR equipment appeared in 1945 and was installed in the Ju 88 G-6.

Delays of BMW 801 engine deliveries forced the project to be temporarily abandoned. In November 1941 the directive for the design team had been a J-1 with a Spanner IR system, and a J-2 with Lichtenstein radar. In 1942 the directive changed slightly, and the J-2 was to be fitted with AI radar. Specifically, the Dornier was to be armed with four MG FF fuselage mounted cannon and machine guns for bomber assault, and one MG 131 each in the B-Stand and C-Stand positions for defence from RAF night fighters. Curiously, the night fighter version was ordered to be able to carry eight 50 kg bombs so the type could act as a night fighter and intruder over enemy territory.

The electronic equipment to be installed was listed as the FuG X, 16, 25 Peil G V air-to-ground communications and blind landing devices. The FuB1.1 was also listed as a potential piece, and if possible a FuG 101 radio equipment was to be fitted as standard. It was intended to equip J-1 with the Lichtenstein FuG 202, which had an effective range of 4,000-metre, with three tubes. The weight of the equipment would reduce the performance of the J-1 by 30 – 40 km/h so in January 1942, Dornier opted to install the IR spanner equipment instead of the Lichtensten. A rear braking system had also been in the original plan, but it was deemed unnecessary. The design was declared ready on 5 January 1942 and first flew later that month. The prototype was delivered to the Tarnewitz test facility where gunnery trials took place with MG FF and MG 17 weapons. Satisfied with the performance, series production began in March 1942.

==== Do 217 J-1 ====
The operational Dornier night fighter, redesignated J-1, before entering operations was powered by BMW 801L engines. It was fitted with a revised crew compartment housing a crew of three, with a solid nose housing four fixed 7.92 mm MG 17 machine guns, with four 20 mm MG FF/M cannon in the forward part of the ventral gondola. It retained the MG 131s in a dorsal turret and ventral position of the bomber, and could carry eight 50 kilograms (110 lb) bombs in the rear bomb-bay, with a fuel tank in the forward bomb-bay.

Production had commenced in March 1942, during which eight J-1s were built. In April, 13 followed and 55 were built in May. Despite this start production declined in June and this trend continued until November 1942, when only four were built. Dornier had been ordered to withdraw Dornier airframes for unspecified reasons. Owing to this, by 31 December 1942, only 130 J-1s had been completed. Dornier kept a production run of 19 aircraft for evaluating equipment. These were to be used when Josef Kammhuber, General of the Night fighters demanded the J-1 to have a modified fuselages made available for upward firing cannon installed within the dorsal areas of the fuselage, above the wing roots. This armament configuration was called Schräge Musik ("slanted" or "oblique" Music). A prototype was given four MG 151s in place of its MG FFs and named J-1/U1. The prototype was modified in September 1942 and sent to the Tarnwitz Experimental Establishment on 14 October for tests on gunnery performance. The guns delivered 125,000 rounds during tests without problems. The concept was available for adoption, although Dornier had some reservations about the slow firing pattern of the MG 151/20.

The Dornier appeared to be a very effective night fighter with significant hitting power. However it attracted strong criticism from the Luftwaffe. After the first J-1 was delivered to 4./Nachtjagdgeschwader 1, in March 1942, the crew complained it was too heavy, and criticised its takeoff and landing characteristics. The pilot complained it had "too little performance reserve". The aircraft's high service loading and its poor manoeuvrability in aerial combat did not enhance its performance reputation. Part of the types performance issues lay with the fact the MG 131 defensive guns and bomb release mechanisms had remained, and been built into the J-1 to allow for its use as a bomber. With eight machine guns mounted in the fuselage and the supporting ammunition, the weight was increased and outweighed the Do 217E by 750 kg.

==== Do 217 J-2 ====
The J-2 night-fighter version of Do-217J was fitted with FuG 202 Lichtenstein radar in the nose, and had the rear bomb-bay plated over. The MG FF/M of the J-1 were replaced by 20 mm MG 151 cannons. The J-1 was withdrawn from intruder duty following an order stopping night intruder raids against England, while the J-2 proved disappointing as a night fighter, showing poor performance and manoeuvrability, although they were used for early trials of the Schräge Musik arrangement of upward firing cannon, three Js being used for tests in July 1942. The J-2 was only converted from J-1s.

There was little difference in design between the J-1 and J-2, save for the FuG 202 Lichtenstein C1 radar fitted to the later. The first C-1 had been used in the Dornier Do 17 Z-10. Production of the C-1 began in full only after the Do 217J production had ceased. FuG 202 Lichtenstein radar continued to be used in Dorniers, although historian Manfred Griehl points out this was only according to the manuals.

Complaints were made by crews about the performance of the Dornier in comparison to other German types. On 12 May 1942 Erhard Milch ordered that Dornier cease all night fighter design. It was decided that the Ju 88 series only (Ju 88 C-6) would continue to be developed and serve as a heavy night fighter. Strangely, the order was not passed onto the Dornier design team who continued to produce the N variant.

=== Do 217 N ===
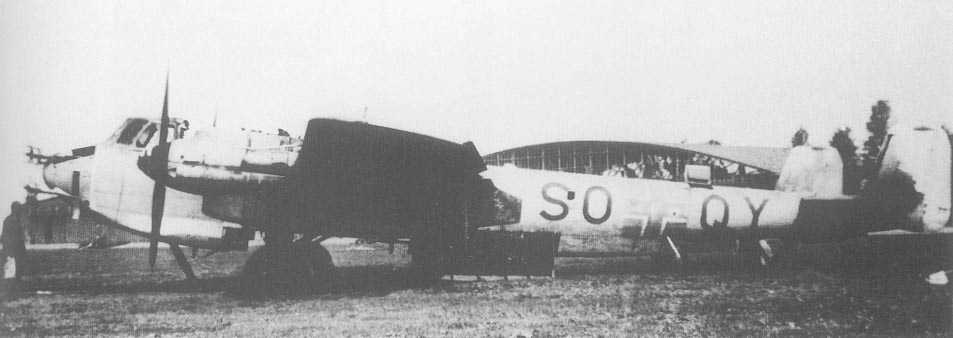
Do 217N-1, captured at Straubing, May 1945

The end of the J series did not mean the end of the Dornier night fighter. One of the few German fighter pilots to side with the type against its critics was Hauptmann Rudolf Schoenert of III./Nachtjagdgeschwader 3. Schoenert suggested to his Commanding officer, in July 1942, that trials be made of weapons slanting upwards at an angle of 70° (later known as Schräge Musik) in the fuselage in the hope of increasing the efficiency of his Do 217. This entailed mounting four to six MG 151/20 autocannon in the centre of the fuselage. At Technisches Amt, two Do 217s, one with four and the other with six MG/151/20 cannon were ready for inspection on 5 August 1942 and testing in September. The idea of the upward firing cannon had originally come from an engineer, Dr. Poppendieck, in June 1942. Nevertheless, Schoenert built on it, and with the introduction of the IR spanner and headlight, the bomber could approach from below a British bomber and avoid exposure to its powerful powered turrets guarding its tail, nose and upper fuselage by attacking from behind or head-on. Unlike the B-17 Flying Fortress or B-24 Liberator, the British bombers did not have a ventrally located ball turret, and the new Dornier design attempted to take advantage. It was decided, due to cost, to limit the upward-firing armament to four guns. Other tactical improvements involved fitting a semi-rigid brake parachute in October 1942, allowing the Dornier to adjust to the speed of the bomber before firing on its target. The prototypes J-1/U2 and J-1/U4 were tested under these conditions.

These designs were to be carried forward into the new variant, the Dornier Do 217 N. The BMW 801 that powered the Do 217 J proved underpowered, so a night-fighter using the more powerful DB 603 A-1 engines was produced, with the first prototype flying on 31 July 1942. While it had much improved performance, it was still unpopular due to its poor agility and climb rate, and was prone to engine problems. Ten pre-production series N variants were designated as test beds. Trials began in the summer of 1942. On 16 August the second prototype Do 217, N V2, entered trials,. The N V1 and N V2 were the main testbeds, and the DB 603 A-1s they were powered by were tested at high altitude. On 11 October 1942 the N V1 crashed after stalling with its landing gear down and crashing into Müritz Lake, killing the crew. On 21 December 1942, 100-hour engine endurance trials began at Rechlin with the DB engines. The pistons became useless after 91 hours. Testing of DB 603 A-2 inline engines was carried out between 28 April and 8 May 1943, but the programme was beset by continual breakdowns and the project was abandoned. There was no further record of the N variant prototypes after 20 June 1943.

In April 1943, the four MG FF guns had started but were not completed until the late summer. The third prototype, N-1/U was fitted with MG 151/20 and unspecified aerodynamic refinements. The machine was used in high-altitude de-icing tests, and the aircraft was tested with Lichtenstein BCR and Bernhardine radar. In August ten of these aircraft were constructed, and between 27 and 31 August, they were fitted with their Schräge Musik at Erprobungsstelle Tarnewitz and Wismar Testing Facilities. The tenth N variant, designated N-0, underwent radio trials. The machine was tested with the Peil G VI/APZ 6, a later and more sophisticated variant automatic direction-finding equipment. On 2 December further tactical trials were carried out with infrared target-illuminating equipment. These trials were carried out with DB 601 powered J-1s.

==== N-1 and N-2 ====
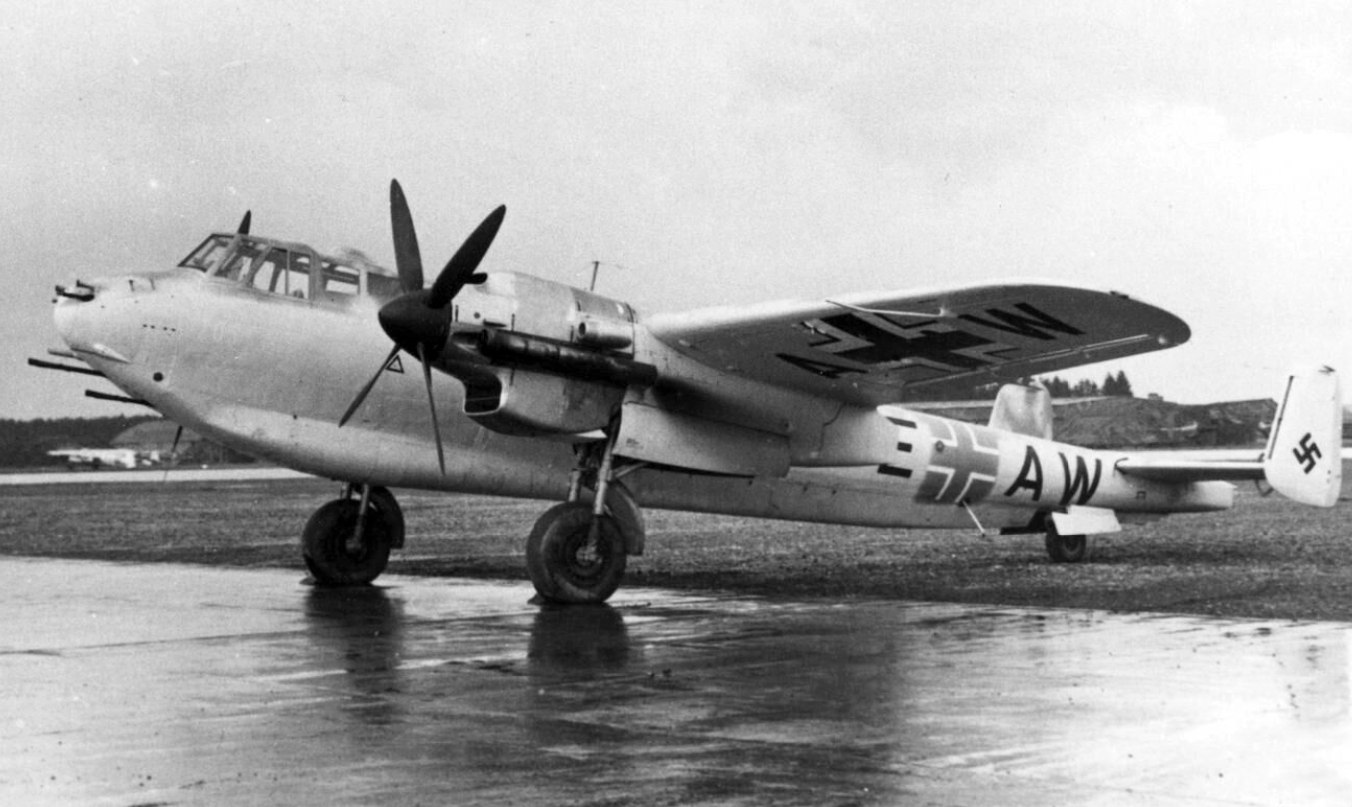
A Dornier Do 217 N-2 night fighter without radar

After testing was satisfied the two variants, the N-1 and N-2, which had two sub-variants, were fitted with FuG 202. The N-1 variants were given two sub-variants which were to follow the design of the E-2/E-4 and the J-1/J-2 with emphasis on range and endurance. Extra fuel tanks were added to the empty bomb bay. For operations over water the heavy night fighters were fitted with lifeboats and radio transmitters. The FuG X with TZG 10 and FuG 16. IFF equipment was the FuG 25s. The N also had the FuG 101 radio altimeter, blind flying equipment FuB1 2 and PeilG V. AI search radar was the FuG 202. The no longer needed bomb release gear remained, bringing the aircraft up to 15,000 kilograms (33,000 lb) on take-off, so it was barely able to reach 7,400 metres (24,300 ft). Fuel consumption lightened the load, and the Dornier could reach a maximum operational ceiling of 8,400 metres (27,600 ft). The speed of the N was a maximum of 500 kilometres per hour (270 kn) at 6,000 metres (20,000 ft). The N-2 was much improved, as it was much lighter and refined.

Overall the N-1 was an initial production of the J-1 version. Powered by a DB 603 it had similar armament to Do 217 J-2, retaining defensive armament. Entered service in April 1943. Some modified with dorsal and ventral guns replaced by wooden fairings as Do 217 N-1/U1, conversion with Schräge Musik arrangement of four upward-firing 20 mm MG 151s as Do 217 N-1/U3. About 240 built.

The Do 217 N-2 was a new build equivalent of Do 217 N-1/U1; some were fitted with two or four cannon in Schräge Musik installation. About 95 were built until it was retired from front line use in mid-1944.

The N-2 was originally not to have the Schräge Musik armament configuration or a brake parachute, but it was then decided to fit the armament set for tactical reasons. A semi-rigid brake parachute was also installed for unspecified reasons. The N-2 prototype was a converted E-1, serial 0174, code PE+AW. Communications were improved on the FuG 16 ZY and FuG 214. The B and C cupolas were removed and the positions fared over with Plexiglas and wood. The MG FF guns were replaced by MG 151/20 cannon. The MG 17s in the nose were to be abandoned with more powerful armament, but this was never carried out. To kill the excess weight that had plagued earlier types, the bomb bay, its doors, and the bomb release gear were removed, and changes were made to the control panels. The gaps were replaced by lighter wood parts which reduced weight, allowing heavier armour protection for the crew. The N variant was the most heavily armoured Dornier variant. The improvements enabled a top speed of 525 kilometres per hour (283 kn) (an increase of 25 kilometres per hour (13 kn)) and a reduction from 15,000 kilograms (33,000 lb) to 12,500 kilograms (27,600 lb), which increased ceiling height to 9,500 metres (31,200 ft).

== Projects, minor production variants ==
=== Do 217A ===
The A variant was a pre-production reconnaissance version, with original shallow fuselage and powered by DB 601A engines. Armed with three MG 15 machine guns. Nine were built, entering service in late 1940, and used for secret reconnaissance missions over the then-neutral Soviet Union. Although the specifications had originally envisaged a multi-role aircraft which could perform bombing missions, it was to function in reconnaissance roles. The fuselage had to be extended to accommodate the two cameras which could be "accessed directly by the crew" (presumably in flight). Dornier was ordered to produce three A-0 series machines up to the E variant. This changed to six as the number of reconnaissance machines was inadequate for the military's need. The small production run would consist of six aircraft. The original power plants, the DB 601Fs, could not be installed in time and the lower performance DB 601B engines were assigned to the type instead for the short term. As in the Dornier Do 17, Rb 20/30 and 50/30 cameras were to be installed. The 20/30 would be fitted in the fuselage while the 50/30 camera was to be placed in the cockpit and be jettisonable. For emergencies the aircraft was to have a fuel transfer unit control installed to move fuel from one tank to another. The first four A-0 aircraft were powered by DB 601Bs while the last two were given DB 601N engines in January 1940. The tests were problem free. However the RLM requested a B variant design which would have a fairing in which the film footage would be stored. Dornier reported that the A-0s were not getting the power plants they required for high altitude reconnaissance sorties so construction had to be delayed. The Do 217B program was suspended, as it turned out, altogether.

Dornier completed work on the V6 prototype, the fourth A-0 aircraft. On 15 October 1939 it was flown successfully. The bomb bay had been enlarged and continued testing various weaponry until 1941. It had DB 601P engines installed and its wing was enlarged in early 1941. The DB 601Ps could operate a maximum altitude of 5,800 m and would use high octane C3 aviation fuel. It should have been ready to fly by March, but problems with the engines slowed progress. At that time Dornier was working on additional features, in particular a new pressurised cabin for the A variant. It also hoped to introduce GM-1 booster units to increase performance at extreme altitudes. The first trial of this aircraft took place on 23 April 1940.

The RLM had stated it wanted the A prototypes to be tested by May 1940 with its high altitude engines. Owing to unresolved engine complications testing was delayed. Finally, on 1 October 1941 RLM ordered Dornier to return the aircraft to its original condition and abandon high altitude modifications. In January 1942 Dornier was ordered to prepare the two Do 217A aircraft fitted with DB 601Fs for immediate combat operations in both transport and bomber roles. The conversion was to be complete by February but the aircraft were not operational. Finally one machine was made ready and began operations with DB 601F engines on 30 December 1942, some ten months later. The other machine was sent to Löwenthal in July 1940 and had undergone trials with autopilot controls. From March 1941 it had been fitted with BMW 801A-1s and later A-2 engines for greater reliability on long-range sorties. In the summer of 1942 BMW 801G-1 engines were installed while later it had trials with BMW 801G-2 engines which had GM-1 boosters fitted in January 1943 for high performance at altitude. A number of the A prototypes served as test beds through the war. The last (V7) flew testing improvised de-icing systems at altitudes of 9,000 metres. In December 1944 the Dornier projects were halted owing to lack of fuel.

In 1940–1941 the A-0s that were allocated to combat units saw service mainly in Western Europe serving in Kampfgeschwader 2 from bases in the Netherlands.

=== Do 217C ===
The C series was a pre-production bomber powered by DB 601A engines and original shallow fuselage. It had five MG 15 machine guns installed and 3,000 kilograms (6,600 lb) bombs as its main offensive armament. Five were built and used as test beds. The V9, which had acted as a prototype for the E variant was also used for the C-0 series. The C-0 was a three crew combat aircraft powered by Jumo 211B engines and had a four-bladed 3.8 m airscrew. The RLM found no faults with the new machine in a June 1939 inspection. The only minor complaint was the limited view from the pilots' seat. Apart from the same engines and small fuselage space inherent in C-series aircraft, externally the C looked like the A-0 series. On 12 November 1940 Dornier increased the number of the crew to four to enable the five MG 15 weapons in the A, B and C-Stand positions to operate with the maximum protection. The bomb bay had also been modified to take four SC 500 or multiple SC 50 bomb loads. The Do 217 C-0 was equipped with a Lotfe 7A bomb aiming system and a Revi 12C sight for the pilot. For high-altitude flight sixteen 32-litre oxygen bottles were installed. The C-0 was capable of achieving a maximum speed of 475 kilometres per hour (256 kn) at an altitude of 5,600 metres (18,400 ft). Carrying a full operational load, its maximum speed was reduced by 20 kilometres per hour (11 kn).

The first Do 217 series aircraft, Wk Nr. 2710 flew on tests between September 1940 and March 1941. It crashed on 2 July 1942 at Rechlin. The second C-0 prototype was fitted with dive brakes on the under side of the wings but this configuration was abandoned in January 1941 and replaced by a brake parachute installed in the tail. The third prototype flew on 6 September 1940 and four further machines flew between September and November 1940. The final machine, 2716, flew on 6 November 1940. The eight machines remained at Rechlin in various test bed roles until at least July 1942. The C series project was abandoned and its variants never entered mass production.

=== Do 217H, L and R ===
The Do 217 H was a conversion of a Do 217E with DB 601 engines fitted with experimental turbo-superchargers. The H V1 to H V3 prototypes were designed as unarmed bombers with DB engines with 3.8 m VDM propellers. Bombs, Recon cameras, and dive brakes were all dispensable. The H V1 was delivered in September 1941 but crashed soon after as a result of propeller failure. After the evaluation of the flight, the wings were expanded to 67 m^{2}. In September 1943, after nearly two years of constant delays, the H V1 was fitted with DB603G prototype engines. It is unknown how these tests developed. The H V2 also crashed on 25 October 1942, severely injuring the crew. The cause was the propellers. The H V3 tested a variety of DB603s until November 1944. On 9 June 1942 it successfully tested at high altitude. It also proved successful testing twin exhausts and pulse jets. Later, in October three and four-bladed duralumin propellers were used. Because of better vibration characteristics, the four-bladed VDM was judged the best performer. On 11 October 1942 the first flight was made at 8,000 m. After, 9,000 m flights were reached. In September 1943 the DB603E had improved superchargers, giving better high-altitude performance. The H series continued as test beds for the M series until October, when they were cancelled for lack of fuel.

The L was a variant of the Do 217K with revised cockpit layout and armament. Only two prototypes were built. The R was a Dornier Do 317 with cabin pressurisation systems removed and modified to carry Hs 293 missiles. Only five built.

=== Do 217P ===
High altitude reconnaissance/bomber version with two DB 603B engines supercharged by a single Daimler-Benz DB 605T engine, in a so-called Hohen-Zentrale Anlage (HZ-Anlage) installation in the central fuselage, as one example of the Henschel Hs 130E had been fitted with, solely for powering a shaft-driven centrifugal supercharger. Three prototypes, plus three pre-production Do 217P-0 aircraft, armed with six MG 81s. Ceiling of 16,200 metres (53,100 ft).

== Variant list ==
- Do 217 A-0: Pre-production series with two 1,100 PS (809 kilowatts (1,085 hp)) DB 601B inline engines, used for reconnaissance missions. Only eight aircraft were built.
- Do 217 C-0: Pre-production bomber, DB 601B engines, increased defensive armament. Only four built.
- Do 217 E-0: Pre-production bomber with deepened fuselage and powered by two 1,560 PS 1,147 kilowatts (1,538 hp) BMW 801A engines.
- Do 217 E-1: Production bomber with five 7.92 mm (.312 in) MG 15 machine guns and one 15 mm MG 151 cannon for defence.
- Do 217 E-2: Bomber with dive bombing capabilities, with three 7.92 mm MG 15s, two 13 mm (.51 in) MG 131 machine guns, one 15 mm MG 151, and a 4,000 kilograms (8,800 lb) bombload.
- Do 217 E-3: Level bomber, seven 7.92 mm (.312 in) MG 15s and one forward-firing 20 mm MG FF cannon.
- Do 217 E-4: BMW 801L engines.
- Do 217 E-5: E-4 with extended wingspan, modified on production line with added Kehl radio control gear to launch Henschel Hs 293 missiles.
- Do 217 G: In January 1940 Dornier produced a data sheet for a Do 217 G with BMW 801 engines with the same airframe as a Do 217 E-1. None were built.
- Do 217 H: Conversion of a Do 217 E with DB 601 engines fitted with experimental turbo-superchargers.
- Do 217 K: Bomber with redesigned forward fuselage with stepped windscreen eliminated, a common World War II German bomber cockpit design concept adopted just before the start of World War II initially on earlier Heinkel bombers (He 111 P and He 177 A). Two 1,560 PS BMW 801L radial engines.
- Do 217 K-1: Standard bomber version.
- Do 217 K-2: Extended wingspan with Kehl radio gear to carry Fritz X bombs on underwing racks.
- Do 217 K-3: Similar to K-2, but capable of carrying both Henschel Hs 293 or Fritz X.
- Do 217 M: Bomber; Do 217 K with 1,750 PS 1,287 kilowatts (1,726 hp) DB 603A inline piston engines.
- Do 217 M-1: Equivalent to the K-1.
- Do 217 M-3: DB 603A-engined equivalent to the K-3.
- Do 217 M-5: Kehl radio gear-equipped Henschel Hs 293 carrier with a single missile mounted semi-externally beneath the fuselage.
- Do 217 M-11: Similar to the K-2 with extended wingspan, Kehl control gear and Fritz X bombs.
- Do 217 J: Night fighter based on the Do 217 E. Solid nose with four 7.92 mm (.312 in) MG 17 machine guns and four 20 mm MG FFs.
- Do 217 J-1: Night intruder version.
- Do 217 J-2: Dedicated night fighter. Bomb bays removed.
- Do 217 L: Modified version of the Do 217 K with rearranged cockpit and defensive armament. Only two built.
- Do 217 N: Night fighter based on the Do 217 M. Armament similar to Do 217 J but with improved 20 mm MG 151/20 cannons replacing the 20 mm MG FFs plus the addition of four 20 mm MG 151/20s as Schräge Musik.
- Do 217 N-1: Similar to J-2.
- Do 217 N-2: N-1 with defensive gun turret and bomb bay equipment removed to reduce weight.
- Do 217 P: High-altitude reconnaissance aircraft with two 1,860 PS 1,368 kilowatts (1,835 hp) DB 603B supercharged by a DB 605T in the fuselage (the Höhenzentrale, or "HZ" system) with a ceiling of 16,155 metres (53,002 ft). Three Do 217 P-0 pre-production aircraft only.
- Do 217 R: Dive bomber with increased wing area, greater defensive armament, and dive brakes. Four prototypes built.

== Production ==
The production of the Do 217 lasted until December 1943. Between January and August 1944 conversions only took place. Below is a list of the numbers produced.

Quarterly production 1939–1944:

Quarter	Year	Bombers	Night fighters
Fourth	1939	1	0
First	1940	1	0
Second	1940	4	0
Third	1940	3	0
Fourth	1940	12	0
First	1941	47	0
Second	1941	52	0
Third	1941	105	0
Fourth	1941	73	0
First	1942	99	8
Second	1942	164	75
Third	1942	160	46
Fourth	1942	141	28
First	1943	187	70
Second	1943	181	64
Third	1943	135	73
Fourth	1943	1	0

== Flying the Do 217 M-1 ==
In October 1945 British Captain Eric Brown undertook full handling trials with a Do 217 M-1 WNr 56158 at RAF Farnborough. He recalled a distinctly "underwhelming" experience. Brown recalled that he took off with full power of some 2,700 rpm and the lightly loaded Do 217 M left the runway at 160 km/h (99 mph). Brown held a shallow climb, waiting to reach 200 km/h (120 mph) before retracting the undercarriage. Brown timed the time it took to retract, which was between 30 and 40 seconds. At 150 m (490 ft) he reduced power to 2,500 rpm and raised the flaps at about 230 km/h (140 mph). With the flaps up a climbing speed of 230 km/h (140 mph) was established giving a rate of "very moderate proportions".

At cruising speed, Brown took the Dornier to 5,500 m (18,000 ft) and with the tail at +2 degrees angle of incidence, gave it a top speed of 523 km/h (325 mph), true air speed. Brown stated the aircraft was very stable about all three axes, and the controls were well harmonised and effective, and not unduly heavy for bomber operations. At the other end of the speed range, stall occurred at 154 km/h (96 mph), and was characterised by a gentle nose-down pitch. Brown tried the Dornier's single-engine performance and this "proved decidedly unimpressive". It underlined that the aircraft was underpowered. Above 1,500 m (4,900 ft), height could not be maintained at 2,300 rpm and its ceiling was barely 7,600 m (24,900 ft). Brown reverted to "normal power", and decided to "chance his arm" (risk) on a dive-bombing procedure in what he described as a "ponderous aeroplane". Brown made a straight dive to 700 km/h (430 mph), the maximum permitted below 3,000 m (9,800 ft) to get a feel for the controls, which began to stiffen considerably. The engine revolutions built to 2,750 during the dive causing a lot of noise. Brown pulled the aircraft out of its dive though it called for a "good full-blooded heave" on the control column.

After climbing to regain height, Brown decided to test the tail-mounted, clamshell-like dive brake and automatic pull-out equipment. The Dornier entered the dive automatically when the dive switch was selected and soon attained its "braked condition", limiting the airspeed to 575 km/h (357 mph). The pull-out was initiated by hitting the bomb-release stick on the control column or selecting the "level flight" switch, which also retracted the dive-brake. Brown stated, "All very sedate and totally unimpressive as a precision weapon".

The landing procedure began at an air speed of 250 km/h (160 mph). The oil coolers were opened fully and the radiator hatches opened to 30 degrees. At 240 km/h (150 mph) the undercarriage was lowered, which again took 30 to 40 seconds. Flaps were lowered to their start position at 235 km/h (146 mph) and fully deployed at 220 km/h (140 mph). The tail had to be trimmed to 4 degrees incidence (tail heavy). Final approach was made at 200 km/h (120 mph) and touchdown occurred at about 160 km/h (99 mph). Landing weight was roughly 13,000 kg (29,000 lb). The control column had to be held back beyond the neutral to keep the tail wheel locked until the landing run was complete.

== Operational history ==
The first deliveries of Do 217s to operational units of the Luftwaffe was the pre-production Do 217A-0 reconnaissance aircraft, which entered service with the Aufklärungsgruppe der Oberbefehlshaber der Luftwaffe to carry out clandestine reconnaissance missions over the Soviet Union. Deliveries of the Do 217E started late in 1940, with some aircraft joining another reconnaissance unit, 2 Staffel of Fernaufklärungsgruppe 11, which was also involved in spyflights over the Soviet Union from bases in Romania.

=== Western Europe ===
The first bomber unit to receive the Dornier Do 217 was II Gruppe of Kampfgeschwader 40 (II/KG 40) in March 1941, followed by KG 2 later that year. At first these units, based in the Netherlands, were used to carry out minelaying and anti-shipping operations over the North Sea. On the night of 24/25 April 1942, however, Dornier Do 217s of KG 2 took part in an attack on the city of Exeter, the first raid of what was to become known as the Baedeker Blitz. KG 2's Dorniers were heavily deployed during the Baedeker raids, against British provincial cities which were less heavily defended than London, which continued until July that year.

The Do 217 squadrons had little time to recover as on 19 August 1942 the Allies launched an amphibious raid on Dieppe in Northern France, with KG 2 launching almost its entire strength of 80 aircraft in response, losing 20 over Dieppe. It had suffered serious losses of trained personnel during operations during 1942, with the number of combat ready crews in KG 2 falling from 88 at the start of the year to 23 by September.

The Dornier Do 217-equipped bomber units spent most of the rest of 1942 recovering from these losses and re-equipping with the more capable Do 217K and M. Night attacks against Britain re-commenced in January 1943, and continued sporadically throughout the year, often suffering heavy losses. As an example the Do 217 equipped KG 2 lost 26 complete crews during March 1943. The pace of bombing attacks against Britain increased again in January 1944 with the launch of Operation Steinbock, with the Do 217 equipped I and III KG/2 and I/KG 66 being involved, these attacks continuing until May, with the bomber units again taking heavy losses.

Two Gruppen of the anti-shipping Kampfgeschwader 100 (KG 100) equipped with Do 217s in 1943, with II/KG 100 receiving the Do 217E-5, equipped to carry the Hs 293 guided missile and III/KG 100 the Do 217K-2, with the Fritz-X guided bomb. II/KG 100 made its combat debut against Royal Navy warships in the Bay of Biscay on 25 August 1943, when it near missed the sloop HMS Landguard, while on 27 August, a second attack by 18 Do 217s sank the sloop HMS Egret and badly damaged the destroyer HMCS Athabaskan. This attack lead to a temporary withdrawal of Royal Navy surface ships from the Bay of Biscay until the guided weapon equipped aircraft were transferred to the Mediterranean following the allied landings at Salerno.

The final actions of Do 217 equipped units over Western Europe was against the allied Invasion of Normandy in June 1944, when the remaining Do 217 equipped bomber units, II/KG 2 and III/KG 100 were thrown into action against the Allied landings. Losses were heavy, with III/KG 100 losing 8 of 13 servicible Do 217s in 10 days of operations. As American forces broke out of the bridgehead at the end of July, III/KG 100 sent its remaining Do 217s to carry out attacks on bridges over the Rivers Sée and Sélune with Hs 293 missiles. They managed a single hit on one of the bridges, which remained in use, while seven Dorniers were lost.

=== Mediterranean and Italy ===
Twelve Do 217 J-1 and J-2 variants were acquired by Italian Regia Aeronautica between September 1942 and June 1943 for night fighter operations. One Italian unit was equipped: 235a Squadriglia of 60° Gruppo (41° Stormo). Based at Treviso San Giuseppe, then at Lonate Pozzolo, the unit performed poorly. The unit shot down only one enemy aircraft, and lost one of their own, after nearly a year of activity.

When the Italian Armistice with the Allies was announced on 9 September 1943, the Italian Fleet was instructed to sail to Malta to surrender. III/KG 100, based at Marseille launched an attack from its base at comprising 11 Do 217s armed with Fritz-X guided bombs against Italian warships near Corsica, sinking the battleship Roma and damaging the battleship Italia. The Dorniers were then deployed against the Allied landings at Salerno, damaging the cruisers USS Savannah and HMS Uganda and the battleship HMS Warspite with Fritz X bombs.

The Dorniers of KG 100 continued to be deployed against convoys in the Mediterranean, but by the time of the Anzio landings in January 1944, heavy allied fighter cover and jamming reduced the effectiveness of the attacks, although Hs 293 missiles sank the cruiser HMS Spartan and several destroyers and merchant ships.

=== Defence of the Reich ===
Deliveries of the Dornier Do 217J-1 started in March 1942, with night-fighter pilots being unimpressed, considering the type to have poor manoeuvrability and speed. The J-1 was relegated to the training role by summer that year, replaced by the radar equipped J-2 in front-line units. Despite the aircraft's faults, the Do 217 was widely used, being used by 11 night-fighter Gruppen, although it did not completely equip any unit, usually being operated in conjunction with the more popular Messerschmitt Bf 110. The Luftwaffe deployed the Do 217 night-fighter over Italy and the Eastern front as well as in direct defence of Germany, but the type had been phased out of service by mid-1944.

== Operators ==
Germany

- Luftwaffe
  - Nachtjagdgeschwader 1
  - Nachtjagdgeschwader 2
  - Nachtjagdgeschwader 4
  - Nachtjagdgeschwader 5
  - Nachtjagdgeschwader 6
  - Nachtjagdgeschwader 100
  - Kampfgeschwader 2
  - Kampfgeschwader 6
  - Kampfgeschwader 40
  - Kampfgeschwader 100
  - Kampfgeschwader 200

Italy

- Regia Aeronautica (Italian Royal Air Force) operated six Do 217-J-1 and six J-2

Switzerland

- Swiss Air Force operated a single Do 217N-2, interned after landing at Basel in 1944 or 1945 and was in use until at least 1946.

== Surviving aircraft ==
A total of 1,925 Do 217s were produced, however no complete aircraft survives. The largest known relic of this aircraft, a large piece of the rear fuselage, can be found at the Italian Air Force Museum in Rome. One remnant of a Do 217 in the United States is one of the Motoranlage unitized BMW 801ML (BMW 801L) radials, still fully cowled, at the New England Air Museum that used to power a Do 217. The remains of two aircraft then based at Toulouse that crashed over the Pyrenées in July 1944, were being recovered in 2013.

== Specifications (Do 217 M-1) ==
Data from Aircraft of the Third Reich Volume one, German Aircraft of the Second World War

General characteristics

- Crew: 4
- Length: 17 m (55 ft 9 in)
- Wingspan: 19 m (62 ft 4 in)
- Height: 4.97 m (16 ft 4 in)
- Wing area: 57 m^{2} (610 sq ft)
- Empty weight: 9,065 kg (19,985 lb) * Empty equipped weight: 10,950 kg (24,140 lb)
- Max takeoff weight: 16,700 kg (36,817 lb)
- Fuel capacity: 2,960 L (780 US gal; 650 imp gal) in fuselage tank and four wing tanks
- Powerplant: 2 × Daimler-Benz DB 603A V-12 inverted liquid-cooled piston engines, 1,305 kW (1,750 hp) each for take-off

1,379 kW (1,849 hp) at 2,100 m (6,900 ft)

- Propellers: 3-bladed VDM constant-speed propellers

Performance

- Maximum speed: 475 km/h (295 mph, 256 kn) at sea level

560 km/h (350 mph; 300 kn) at 5,700 m (18,700 ft)

- Cruise speed: 400 km/h (250 mph, 220 kn) at optimum altitude
- Range: 2,180 km (1,350 mi, 1,180 nmi) with maximum internal fuel
- Ferry range: 2,500 km (1,600 mi, 1,300 nmi) with auxiliary fuel tank
- Service ceiling: 9,500 m (31,200 ft) without bomb load

7,370 m (24,180 ft) with maximum internal bomb load

- Rate of climb: 3.5 m/s (690 ft/min)
- Time to altitude: 1,000 m (3,300 ft) in 3 minutes 18 seconds

2,000 m (6,600 ft) in 6 minutes 42 seconds

Armament

- Guns:

- 2 × 7.92 mm (0.312 in) MG 81 machine gun with 500 rpg in the nose
- 2 × 7.92 mm (0.312 in) MG 81 machine gun with 750 rpg in lateral positions
- 1 × 13 mm (0.512 in) MG 131 machine gun with 500 rounds in ventral step
- 1 × 13 mm (0.512 in) MG 131 machine gun with 500 rounds in dorsal position

- Bombs: maximum bomb load 4,000 kg (8,800 lb) (2,520 kg (5,560 lb) internally)

== See also ==
Related development

- Dornier Do 17
- Dornier Do 215
- Dornier Do 317

Aircraft of comparable role, configuration, and era

- Junkers Ju 188
- Martin B-26 Marauder
- Mitsubishi Ki-67
- North American B-25 Mitchell
- Tupolev Tu-2
- Vickers Wellington

Related lists

- List of aircraft of World War II
- List of bomber aircraft
- List of military aircraft of Germany
