= Tarnewitz test site =

Weapons testing site used by the Nazis

Coordinates: 53.9806°N 11.2514°E

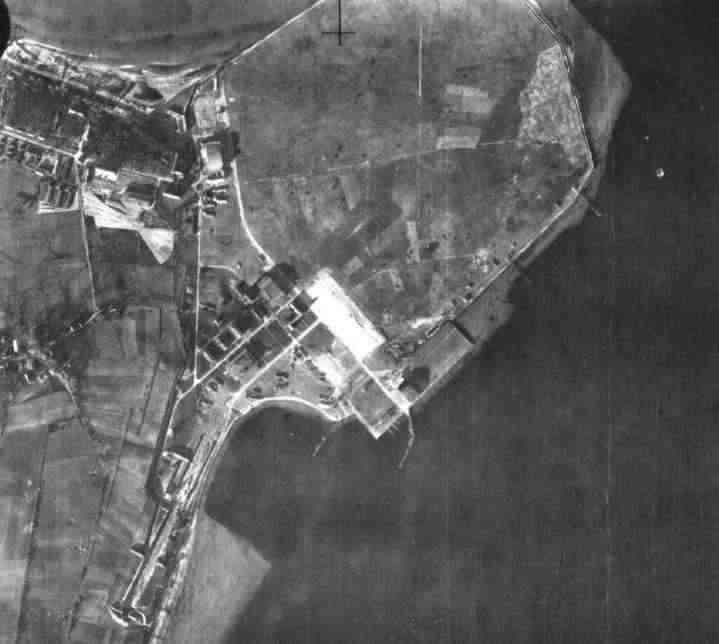
An aerial photograph of the Tarnewitz peninsula dated 1941.

The Tarnewitz test site (German: Erprobungsstelle Tarnewitz) was a Luftwaffe weapons testing facility and airfield in Nazi Germany. It was built on an artificial peninsula at Boltenhagen on the coast of the Baltic Sea, as one of the four Erprobungsstellen stations of the system of Luftwaffe test establishments headquartered at Rechlin.

Construction of the Tarnewitz site commenced in September 1935; on completion the whole peninsula, about 1 kilometre across, was surfaced with asphalt. It was used throughout the Second World War for testing armaments such as machine guns, autocannon and rockets, and their installation on aircraft. Firing was conducted over the sea between the test site and Poel Island. After the start of the Second World War, the site became more involved in the development of experimental Sonderbewaffnung or "special armaments" such as smoke cylinders and airborne mortars. Heavy-calibre (for aerial use) Bordkanone-series autoloading cannon, from 37mm through 50mm and on up to 75mm in calibre were tested for use against armoured fighting vehicles and bomber aircraft. Final tasks included assessment of the weapons of the new generation of point defence fighters, such as the Bachem Ba 349 and the Heinkel P.1077.

Tarnewitz escaped heavy bombing raids but was attacked by US fighter-bombers from May 1944. In May 1945, the site briefly came under US control before being handed over to Soviet forces. It continued in use by various East German military and paramilitary forces until 1990. A marina and hotel complex have since been constructed on part of the site.

== See also ==
- Priwall Peninsula, location of the Erprobungsstelle See/Travemünde Luftwaffe maritime aviation test facility on the Baltic Sea coast in World War II
